= Somerset County Cricket Club in 1979 =

Somerset County Cricket Club
1979 season
- Captain: Brian Rose
- Overseas player: Joel Garner; Hallam Moseley; Viv Richards
- County Championship: 8th
- Gillette Cup: Winners
- John Player League: Winners
- Benson & Hedges Cup: Disqualified
- Most runs: Brian Rose (1,317)
- Most wickets: Vic Marks (57)

Somerset County Cricket Club competed in four competitions in the 1979 season: the first-class County Championship; and three limited overs competitions — the Gillette Cup, the John Player League and the Benson & Hedges Cup. The county fared well in the limited-overs competitions, winning both the Gillette Cup and the John Player League (the first two trophies ever won by the club), but were ejected from the Benson & Hedges Cup when the TCCB ruled they had brought the game into disrepute after a declaration during a match against Worcestershire.

== Squad ==
The following players made at least one appearance for Somerset in First-class or List A cricket in 1979. Age given is at the start of Somerset's first match of the season (29 April 1979).

Name	Nationality	Birth date	Batting style	Bowling style	Notes	Ref
Batsmen
Peter Denning	England	16 December 1949 (aged 29)	Left-handed	Right arm off break		
Mervyn Kitchen	England	1 August 1940 (aged 38)	Left-handed	Right arm medium		
Martin Olive	England	18 April 1958 (aged 21)	Right-handed	Right arm medium		
Viv Richards	West Indies	7 March 1952 (aged 27)	Right-handed	Right arm slow	Overseas player	
Peter Roebuck	England	6 March 1956 (aged 23)	Right-handed	Right arm off break		
Brian Rose	England	4 June 1950 (aged 28)	Left-handed	Left arm medium	Club captain	
Phil Slocombe	England	6 September 1954 (aged 24)	Right-handed	Right arm medium		
All-rounders
Ian Botham	England	24 November 1955 (aged 23)	Right-handed	Right arm fast-medium		
Dennis Breakwell	England	2 July 1948 (aged 30)	Left-handed	Slow left-arm orthodox		
Graham Burgess	England	5 May 1943 (aged 35)	Right-handed	Right arm medium		
Jeremy Lloyds	England	17 November 1954 (aged 24)	Left-handed	Right arm off break		
Vic Marks	England	25 June 1955 (aged 23)	Right-handed	Right arm off break		
Nigel Popplewell	England	8 August 1957 (aged 21)	Right-handed	Right arm medium		
Wicket-keepers
Trevor Gard	England	2 June 1957 (aged 21)	Right-handed	—		
Derek Taylor	England	12 November 1942 (aged 36)	Right-handed	—		
Bowlers
Colin Dredge	England	4 August 1954 (aged 24)	Left-handed	Right arm medium		
Joel Garner	West Indies	16 December 1952 (aged 26)	Right-handed	Right arm fast	Overseas player	
David Gurr	England	27 March 1956 (aged 23)	Right-handed	Right arm fast-medium		
Keith Jennings	England	5 October 1953 (aged 25)	Right-handed	Right arm medium		
Hallam Moseley	West Indies	28 May 1948 (aged 30)	Right-handed	Right arm fast-medium	Overseas player	

== County Championship ==
=== Season standings ===
Note: Pld = Played, W = Wins, L = Losses, D = Draws, A = Abandonments, Bat = Batting points, Bwl = Bowling points, Pts = Points.

County Championship
Team	Pld	W	L	D	A	Bat	Bwl	Pts
Essex (C)	22	13	4	4	1	56	69	281
Worcestershire	22	7	4	10	1	58	62	204
Surrey	22	6	3	12	1	50	70	192
Sussex	22	6	4	10	2	47	65	184
Kent	22	6	3	13	0	49	60	181
Leicestershire	22	4	5	12	1	60	68	176
Yorkshire	22	5	3	13	1	52	63	175
Somerset	22	5	1	15	1	56	55	171
Nottinghamshire	22	6	4	9	3	43	54	169
Gloucestershire	22	5	4	11	2	53	54	167
Northamptonshire	22	3	6	12	1	59	58	153
Hampshire	22	3	9	9	1	39	66	141
Lancashire	22	4	4	14	0	37	55	140
Middlesex	22	3	3	14	2	44	60	140
Warwickshire	22	3	7	11	1	46	51	133
Derbyshire	22	1	6	14	1	46	60	118
Glamorgan	22	0	10	11	1	35	58	93
Source: CricketArchive

=== Match log ===
No.	Date	Opponents	Venue	Result	Ref
1	2–4 May	Worcestershire	County Ground, New Road, Worcester	Drawn	
2	9–11 May	Northamptonshire	County Ground, Taunton	Won by 10 wickets	
3	16–18 May	Surrey	County Ground, Taunton	Drawn	
4	26–29 May	Gloucestershire	Phoenix County Ground, Bristol	Match abandoned	
5	30 May–1 June	Warwickshire	Edgbaston, Birmingham	Drawn	
6	2–5 June	Hampshire	County Ground, Taunton	Drawn	
7	13–15 June	Kent	Hesketh Park, Dartford	Drawn	
8	16–19 June	Essex	Recreation Ground, Bath	Drawn	
9	20–22 June	Glamorgan	Recreation Ground, Bath	Drawn	
10	27–29 June	Worcestershire	County Ground, Taunton	Won by 208 runs	
11	30 June–2 July	Yorkshire	St George's Road, Harrogate	Drawn	
12	7–10 July	Glamorgan	St Helen's, Swansea	Won by an innings and 8 runs	
13	11–13 July	Warwickshire	County Ground, Taunton	Won by 153 runs	
14	14–17 July	Leicestershire	Grace Road, Leicester	Drawn	
15	1–3 August	Hampshire	County Ground, Southampton	Drawn	
16	4–7 August	Lancashire	Old Trafford, Manchester	Drawn	
17	11–14 August	Sussex	Clarence Park, Weston-super-Mare	Won by 6 wickets	
18	15–17 August	Nottinghamshire	Clarence Park, Weston-super-Mare	Drawn	
19	18–21 August	Middlesex	Lord's Cricket Ground, St John's Wood	Drawn	
20	25–28 August	Gloucestershire	County Ground, Taunton	Drawn	
21	1–4 September	Derbyshire	County Ground, Taunton	Drawn	
22	5–7 September	Sussex	County Ground, Hove	Lost by 9 wickets	

=== Batting averages ===
Player	Matches	Innings	Runs	Average	Highest Score	100s	50s
Peter Roebuck	20	32	1,125	45.00	89	0	10
Peter Denning	20	31	1,114	42.84	106	2	6
Brian Rose	20	31	1,270	42.33	133	2	8
Viv Richards	15	24	996	41.50	156	3	4
Colin Dredge	9	10	196	39.20	55	0	1
Vic Marks	21	27	762	38.10	93	0	7
Ian Botham	11	15	487	34.78	120	1	1
Derek Taylor	20	20	318	31.80	50*	0	1
Phil Slocombe	20	32	804	27.72	103*	1	6
Dennis Breakwell	21	26	441	24.50	54*	0	2
Jeremy Lloyds	3	5	92	18.40	43	0	0
Joel Garner	14	10	106	17.66	53	0	1
Mervyn Kitchen	5	6	87	14.50	34	0	0
Hallam Moseley	6	4	25	8.33	15	0	0
Nigel Popplewell	6	8	50	7.14	13	0	0
Keith Jennings	16	9	16	4.00	11*	0	0
David Gurr	3	1	11	—	11*	0	0
Trevor Gard	1	1	7	—	7*	0	0

Source: CricketArchive

=== Bowling averages ===
Player	Matches	Wickets	Average	BBI	5wi	10wm
Joel Garner	14	55	13.83	6/80	4	0
Peter Roebuck	20	1	22.00	1/2	0	0
Hallam Moseley	6	17	22.64	5/18	1	0
Vic Marks	21	50	27.54	6/33	4	0
Dennis Breakwell	21	40	30.00	6/41	1	0
Colin Dredge	9	21	31.38	4/40	0	0
Ian Botham	11	26	32.53	6/81	1	0
Keith Jennings	16	16	33.56	4/25	0	0
Nigel Popplewell	6	5	43.00	3/43	0	0
Viv Richards	15	3	69.33	2/47	0	0
David Gurr	3	2	92.50	2/36	0	0
Jeremy Lloyds	3	0	—	—	0	0

Source: CricketArchive

== Other first-class matches ==
=== Match log ===
Match type	Date	Opponents	Venue	Result	Ref
University match	9–12 June	Oxford University	The University Parks, Oxford	Drawn	
University match	23–25 June	Cambridge University	Recreation Ground, Bath	Won by 6 wickets	
Tourist match	28–30 July	Indians	County Ground, Taunton	Drawn	

== Gillette Cup ==
=== Match log ===
No.	Stage	Date	Opponents	Venue	Result	Ref
—	First round	No game (bye)				
1	Second round	18 July	Derbyshire	County Ground, Taunton	Won by 8 wickets	
2	Quarter-final	8 August	Kent	County Ground, Taunton	Won by 130 runs	
3	Semi-final	22 August	Middlesex	Lord's Cricket Ground, St John's Wood	Won by 7 wickets	
4	Final	8 September	Northamptonshire	Lord's Cricket Ground, St John's Wood	Won by 45 runs	

=== Batting averages ===
Player	Matches	Innings	Runs	Average	Highest Score	100s	50s
Viv Richards	4	4	266	66.50	117	1	1
Peter Denning	4	3	112	56.00	90*	0	1
Brian Rose	4	4	163	54.33	88*	0	1
Graham Burgess	3	2	51	51.00	50*	0	1
Joel Garner	4	2	36	36.00	24*	0	0
Ian Botham	4	3	62	31.00	29	0	0
Peter Roebuck	4	4	60	20.00	26	0	0
Phil Slocombe	2	2	40	20.00	38	0	0
Vic Marks	2	1	9	9.00	9	0	0
Keith Jennings	4	1	7	7.00	7	0	0
Dennis Breakwell	4	2	13	6.50	8	0	0
Derek Taylor	4	2	3	3.00	2	0	0
Colin Dredge	1	0	—	—	—	0	0

Source: CricketArchive

=== Bowling averages ===
Player	Matches	Overs	Wickets	Average	Economy	BBI	4wi	5wi
Joel Garner	4	43.0	17	5.41	2.13	6/29	1	2
Graham Burgess	3	26.0	5	14.80	2.84	3/25	0	0
Keith Jennings	4	40.0	6	17.33	2.60	3/31	0	0
Ian Botham	4	43.0	4	33.25	3.09	3/15	0	0
Viv Richards	4	15.0	1	72.00	4.80	1/44	0	0
Colin Dredge	1	12.0	0	—	2.66	—	0	0
Dennis Breakwell	4	20.0	0	—	3.55	—	0	0
Vic Marks	2	4.0	0	—	5.50	—	0	0

Source: CricketArchive

== John Player League ==
=== Season standings ===
Note: Pld = Played, W = Wins, L = Losses, NR = No result, A = Abandonments, Pts = Points, RR = Run rate.

John Player League
Team	Pld	W	L	NR	A	Pts	RR
Somerset (C)	16	12	3	0	1	50	4.257
Kent	16	11	3	0	2	48	4.185
Worcestershire	16	9	4	1	2	42	5.032
Middlesex	16	9	5	0	2	40	4.385
Yorkshire	16	8	4	1	3	40	4.322
Essex	16	8	6	1	1	36	4.277
Leicestershire	16	7	5	1	3	36	4.361
Gloucestershire	16	7	7	0	2	32	4.414
Nottinghamshire	16	6	6	1	3	32	4.376
Hampshire	16	7	8	0	1	30	4.368
Lancashire	16	6	7	3	0	30	4.154
Glamorgan	16	6	10	0	0	24	4.108
Northamptonshire	16	5	9	1	1	24	4.170
Surrey	16	5	9	1	1	24	4.255
Sussex	16	6	10	0	0	24	4.220
Derbyshire	16	4	9	0	3	22	4.065
Warwickshire	16	2	13	0	1	10	4.694
Source: CricketArchive

=== Match log ===
No.	Date	Opponents	Venue	Result	Ref
1	29 April	Surrey	Kennington Oval, Kennington	Won by 6 runs	
2	13 May	Warwickshire	County Ground, Taunton	Won by 4 runs	
3	20 May	Worcestershire	County Ground, New Road, Worcester	Match abandoned	
4	3 June	Hampshire	County Ground, Taunton	Won by 3 wickets	
5	10 June	Gloucestershire	Imperial Athletic Ground, Bristol	Won by 8 wickets	
6	17 June	Essex	Recreation Ground, Bath	Won by 9 wickets	
7	1 July	Yorkshire	North Marine Road, Scarborough	Won by 6 wickets	
8	8 July	Glamorgan	St Helen's, Swansea	Won on faster scoring rate	
9	15 July	Leicestershire	Grace Road, Leicester	Lost by 4 runs	
10	22 July	Northamptonshire	County Ground, Taunton	Won by 7 wickets	
11	5 August	Lancashire	Old Trafford, Manchester	Lost by 8 wickets	
12	12 August	Sussex	Clarence Park, Weston-super-Mare	Won by 75 runs	
13	19 August	Middlesex	Lord's Cricket Ground, St John's Wood	Won by 28 runs	
14	26 August	Kent	County Ground, Taunton	Lost by 64 runs	
15	2 September	Derbyshire	County Ground, Taunton	Won by 55 runs	
16	9 September	Nottinghamshire	Trent Bridge, Nottingham	Won by 56 runs	

=== Batting averages ===
Player	Matches	Innings	Runs	Average	Highest Score	100s	50s
Brian Rose	15	15	484	44.00	81*	0	4
Ian Botham	9	8	174	29.00	55*	0	1
Viv Richards	12	12	347	28.91	80	0	3
Peter Denning	15	15	354	23.60	62	0	1
Derek Taylor	15	6	47	23.50	14*	0	0
Mervyn Kitchen	4	3	43	21.50	22	0	0
Peter Roebuck	11	11	167	20.87	50	0	1
Graham Burgess	10	6	96	16.00	33	0	0
Vic Marks	13	11	137	15.22	30	0	0
Joel Garner	13	10	90	12.85	32	0	0
Phil Slocombe	6	4	33	11.00	19	0	0
Keith Jennings	13	5	17	8.50	8*	0	0
Nigel Popplewell	3	3	14	7.00	8	0	0
Dennis Breakwell	15	10	57	6.33	29	0	0
Colin Dredge	8	3	6	6.00	3*	0	0
Hallam Moseley	3	0	—	—	—	0	0

Source: CricketArchive

=== Bowling averages ===
Player	Matches	Overs	Wickets	Average	Economy	BBI	4wi	5wi
Vic Marks	13	21.3	8	9.87	3.67	3/19	0	0
Ian Botham	9	61.4	15	15.40	3.74	4/10	1	0
Joel Garner	13	96.0	16	16.81	2.80	3/16	0	0
Viv Richards	12	39.1	8	17.00	3.47	2/13	0	0
Colin Dredge	8	56.3	12	18.50	3.92	3/21	0	0
Hallam Moseley	3	21.0	3	21.66	3.09	1/18	0	0
Dennis Breakwell	15	83.0	13	25.00	3.91	3/20	0	0
Keith Jennings	13	88.0	13	26.92	3.97	3/21	0	0
Graham Burgess	10	64.0	8	30.50	3.81	2/19	0	0
Nigel Popplewell	3	21.0	1	41.00	1.95	1/7	0	0

Source: CricketArchive

== Benson & Hedges Cup ==
=== Season standings ===
Note: Pld = Played, W = Wins, L = Losses, NR = No result, Pts = Points, BowSR = Bowling strike rate.

Benson & Hedges Cup: Group A
Team	Pld	W	L	NR	Pts	BowSR
Somerset (DSQ)	4	3	1	0	9	33.321
Worcestershire*	4	3	1	0	9	36.920
Glamorgan*	4	2	1	1	7	36.040
Gloucestershire†	4	1	3	0	3	53.100
Minor Counties South†	4	0	3	1	1	55.692
Teams marked * progressed to the next stage of the competition. Team marked † were eliminated from the competition. Source: CricketArchive

=== Match log ===
No.	Stage	Date	Opponents	Venue	Result	Ref
1	Group A	5, 7 May	Glamorgan	County Ground, Taunton	Won by 5 wickets	
2	Group A	12, 14 May	Gloucestershire	Phoenix County Ground, Bristol	Won by 7 wickets	
3	Group A	19 May	Minor Counties South	County Ground, Taunton	Won by 8 wickets	
4	Group A	23, 24 May	Worcestershire	County Ground, New Road, Worcester	Lost by 10 wickets	

=== Batting averages ===
Player	Matches	Innings	Runs	Average	Highest Score	100s	50s
Viv Richards	3	2	48	48.00	29	0	0
Peter Denning	4	4	92	46.00	40*	0	0
Peter Roebuck	4	2	82	41.00	44	0	0
Brian Rose	4	4	54	18.00	35	0	0
Mervyn Kitchen	1	1	13	13.00	13	0	0
Ian Botham	4	1	0	0.00	0	0	0
Vic Marks	4	3	38	—	29*	0	0
Dennis Breakwell	4	1	36	—	36*	0	0
Colin Dredge	4	0	—	—	—	0	0
Joel Garner	3	0	—	—	—	0	0
Keith Jennings	3	0	—	—	—	0	0
Hallam Moseley	2	0	—	—	—	0	0
Derek Taylor	4	0	—	—	—	0	0

Source: CricketArchive

=== Bowling averages ===
Player	Matches	Overs	Wickets	Average	Economy	BBI	4wi	5wi
Joel Garner	3	28.2	6	7.00	1.48	3/23	0	0
Keith Jennings	3	20.1	5	7.80	1.93	4/11	1	0
Vic Marks	4	21.0	4	10.00	1.90	2/18	0	0
Dennis Breakwell	4	18.0	3	12.66	2.11	2/16	0	0
Ian Botham	4	32.0	5	15.60	2.43	3/23	0	0
Colin Dredge	4	26.0	4	16.00	2.46	2/22	0	0
Hallam Moseley	2	10.0	0	—	2.60	—	0	0

Source: CricketArchive

== Statistics ==
=== Batting ===
Player	First class							List A							Refs
Player	Matches	Innings	Runs	Highest Score	Average	100s	50s	Matches	Innings	Runs	Highest Score	Average	100s	50s	Refs
Batsmen
PW Denning	22	35	1,222	106	42.13	2	7	23	22	558	90*	29.36	0	2	
MJ Kitchen	7	10	146	36	14.60	0	0	5	4	56	22	18.66	0	0	
M Olive	1	2	77	39	38.50	0	0								
IVA Richards	16	26	1,043	156	40.11	3	4	19	18	661	117	38.88	1	4	
PM Roebuck	23	37	1,273	89	47.14	0	11	19	17	309	50	23.76	0	1	
BC Rose	21	33	1,317	133	41.15	2	8	23	23	701	88*	41.23	0	5	
PA Slocombe	23	38	956	103*	27.31	1	6	8	6	73	38	14.60	0	0	
All-rounders
IT Botham	11	15	487	120	34.78	1	1	17	12	236	55*	26.22	0	1	
D Breakwell	24	31	510	54*	23.18	0	2	23	13	106	36*	9.63	0	0	
GI Burgess	1	2	20	11	10.00	0	0	13	8	147	50*	21.00	0	1	
JW Lloyds	4	7	117	43	16.71	0	0								
VJ Marks	24	33	894	93	37.25	0	7	19	15	184	30	18.40	0	0	
NFM Popplewell	7	10	119	37	13.22	0	0	3	3	14	8	7.00	0	0	
Wicket-keepers
T Gard	4	5	71	51*	71.00	0	1								
DJS Taylor	20	20	318	50*	31.80	0	1	23	8	50	14*	16.66	0	0	
Bowlers
CH Dredge	11	11	215	55	35.83	0	1	13	3	6	3*	6.00	0	0	
J Garner	14	10	106	53	17.66	0	1	20	12	126	32	15.75	0	0	
DR Gurr	4	2	31	20*	—	0	0								
KF Jennings	19	11	19	11*	3.16	0	0	20	6	24	8*	8.00	0	0	
HR Moseley	8	5	25	15	8.33	0	0	5	0	—	—	—	0	0	

=== Bowling ===
Player	First class							List A						Refs
Player	Matches	Overs	Wickets	Average	BBI	5wi	10wm	Matches	Overs	Wickets	Average	BBI	4wi	Refs
IT Botham	11	257.4	26	32.53	6/81	1	0	17	136.4	24	18.41	4/10	1	
D Breakwell	24	567.3	47	27.89	6/41	1	0	23	121.0	16	27.12	3/20	0	
GI Burgess	1	5.0	0	—	—	0	0	13	90.0	13	24.46	3/25	0	
CH Dredge	11	251.0	25	30.36	4/40	0	0	13	94.3	16	19.87	3/21	0	
J Garner	14	393.1	55	13.83	6/80	4	0	20	167.2	39	10.33	6/29	3	
DR Gurr	4	71.0	2	94.50	2/36	0	0							
KF Jennings	19	245.3	20	31.00	4/25	0	0	20	148.1	24	20.54	4/11	1	
JW Lloyds	4	6.0	0	—	—	0	0							
VJ Marks	24	568.4	57	27.73	6/33	4	0	19	46.3	12	11.75	3/19	0	
HR Moseley	8	196.4	31	15.96	6/52	2	0	5	31.0	3	30.33	1/18	0	
NFM Popplewell	7	102.0	6	45.16	3/43	0	0	3	21.0	1	41.00	1/7	0	
IVA Richards	16	77.3	5	54.00	2/47	0	0	19	54.1	9	23.11	2/13	0	
PM Roebuck	23	6.0	1	22.00	1/2	0	0							
BC Rose	21	5.0	0	—	—	0	0							

=== Fielding ===
Player	First class		List A		Refs
Player	Matches	Catches	Matches	Catches	Refs
IT Botham	11	11	17	11	
D Breakwell	24	9	23	6	
GI Burgess	1	0	13	3	
PW Denning	22	18	23	3	
CH Dredge	11	5	13	1	
J Garner	14	4	20	1	
DR Gurr	4	0			
KF Jennings	19	9	20	3	
MJ Kitchen	7	8	5	1	
JW Lloyds	4	2			
VJ Marks	24	8	19	4	
HR Moseley	8	1	5	0	
NFM Popplewell	7	1	3	3	
M Olive	1	0			
IVA Richards	16	13	19	7	
PM Roebuck	23	22	19	2	
BC Rose	21	11	23	6	
PA Slocombe	23	8	8	1	

=== Wicket-keeping ===
Player	First class			List A			Refs
Player	Matches	Catches	Stumpings	Matches	Catches	Stumpings	Refs
T Gard	4	6	3				
DJS Taylor	20	30	10	23	20	8	
