= Worcestershire v Somerset, 1979 =

Cricket game in England

- Event: 1979 Benson & Hedges Cup
Somerset	Worcestershire
1/0d.	2/0
1 over	1.4 overs
- Worcestershire won by ten wickets
- Date: 24 May 1979
- Venue: New Road, Worcester
- Umpires: Terry Spencer and Jack van Geloven

In the final round of group matches during the 1979 Benson & Hedges Cup, a one-day cricket competition, Somerset County Cricket Club faced Worcestershire County Cricket Club at New Road, Worcester, on 24 May 1979. The result of the match would help to determine which teams progressed to the quarter-finals. If Somerset lost and Glamorgan won their match, Somerset, Worcestershire and Glamorgan would have been level on points; bowling strike rate would have then been used as a tie-breaker. The Somerset team, led by their captain, Brian Rose, realised that if they batted first and declared the innings closed after just one over, it would protect their strike rate advantage to guarantee their qualification. Somerset scored one run from their over and declared; Worcestershire took ten deliveries to score the two runs they needed to win. The match was completed in 18 minutes, and consisted of only 16 legal deliveries.

Although Somerset's declaration was within the laws of the game, Rose was condemned by the press and cricket officials. The Wisden Cricketers' Almanack claimed that Rose had "sacrificed all known cricketing principles by deliberately losing the game". Just over a week after the match, the Test and County Cricket Board met for an emergency session and voted to eject Somerset from the competition by a vote of seventeen to one. Cricket's rules were later changed to ban declarations in professional one-day cricket, although a similar incident occurred in club cricket in 2017.

== Background ==
At the start of the 1979 season, Somerset had never won a major trophy in their 104-year history. The club had come close to winning each of the three English county cricket one-day competitions in 1978; they were losing semi-finalists in the Benson & Hedges Cup and losing finalists in the Gillette Cup. In the John Player League, they tied with Hampshire and Leicestershire on 48 points to give them equal first place, but Hampshire had the superior run rate, which was used as a tie-breaker to give them the competition. Somerset finished second, a similar fate to that they suffered in the 1976 John Player League, when five teams had tied on points, and Kent won on run rate. The Somerset team, which featured international players such as Viv Richards and Ian Botham, was one of "the most talked-about and glamorous" cricket teams at the time, according to Somerset cricket historian David Foot. Worcestershire were not challenging for honours to the same extent as Somerset, though they had finished fourth in the 1978 John Player League, and had won the 1974 County Championship. Cricket was undergoing a period of increasing commercialism; The Benson & Hedges Cup offered total prize money of over £27,000, £6,500 going to the winning team.

Group A with one round of matches remaining
Team	P	W	L	Pts
Somerset	3	3	0	9
Worcestershire	3	2	1	6
Glamorgan	3	2	1	6
Gloucestershire	4	1	3	3
Minor Counties	3	0	3	0

Entering the final round of matches, Somerset led the group, having won all three of their matches. They faced Worcestershire, while Glamorgan had to play a side representing the Minor Counties. The Somerset players, led by their captain, Brian Rose, worked out that despite their place at the top of the table, they could still miss out on qualification for the quarter-finals. Aware of their previous problems with run rate in the 1976 and 1978 John Player League tournaments, they knew that if they lost heavily to Worcestershire, and Glamorgan beat the weak Minor Counties side by a large enough margin, all three teams would be level on points, and Worcestershire and Glamorgan could qualify by having superior bowling strike rates. Rule Vii (c) of the Benson and Hedges Cup stated: "In the event of two or more teams in any zone having an equal number of points, their position shall be based on the faster rate of taking wickets in all zonal league matches (to be calculated by total balls bowled divided by wickets taken)." After their near misses in previous years, the Somerset players were determined that they were not going to miss out again; one of the players, Vic Marks, said later that they wanted to "atone for the acute disappointments of the 1978 season".

The Somerset players were particularly concerned because of the possible condition of the pitch. Because of the wet weather it had been under the rain covers for a few days, which increased the chances that it would be difficult for the batsman to play on. Although Peter Roebuck suggests in his 1991 official history of Somerset that the origins of the idea were "confused by time", in his 2004 autobiography, Sometimes I Forgot to Laugh, he claims that he was the first to suggest that Somerset could declare their innings at any point, though he professed to immediately regret his suggestion. An alternative suggestion involved batting aggressively to lose all ten wickets quickly, and then allowing Worcestershire to reach the required target easily; an approach previously taken by other cricket teams in a similar situation.

To avoid suffering a heavy defeat that could eliminate them, it was worked out that if Somerset batted first and declared within the first seven balls of their batting innings, it would not matter if they lost, as their bowling strike rate could not suffer sufficiently for them to be knocked out. There was no rule against declaring in one-day cricket, but Rose was aware that the plan was controversial. He discussed it with his teammates and there was no significant opposition—Derek Taylor, the wicket-keeper, did not like the idea, but was not vociferous in the discussion. Viv Richards, Joel Garner and Ian Botham were all very vocal in their support of the suggestion, the former two suggesting that other captains "would not hesitate to take advantage of the rules". Rose sought clarification from Donald Carr, the chairman of the Test and County Cricket Board (TCCB), who administered cricket in England. Carr told Rose that his plan was legal, but against the spirit of the laws, and suggested there would be repercussions if they went ahead. Roy Kerslake, the Somerset chairman, was with the team in Worcester and, though he had reservations, told Rose that he would "support the team whatever their decision".

== Match ==
=== Summary ===
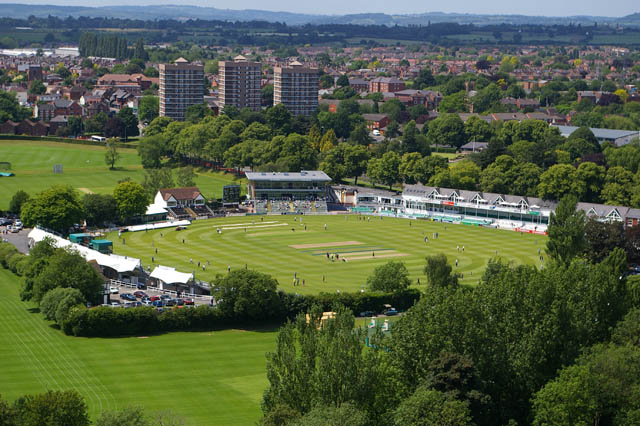
Worcestershire hosted the match at their New Road ground.

The match was scheduled to be played on Wednesday, 23 May 1979, at Worcestershire's New Road ground in Worcester, but rain prevented play and the match was moved to the following day. The same thing happened in Watford, where Glamorgan and the Minor Counties were due to play. Although it was overcast and slightly wet the next morning, play started on time. Rose won the toss for Somerset and chose to bat, opening the batting himself alongside Peter Denning. Worcestershire's Vanburn Holder bowled the first over, which consisted of seven deliveries as it included a no-ball, to Rose, who did not play any scoring shots. The Somerset captain declared the innings closed at the end of the over. Somerset had scored just one run, which they were awarded for the no-ball, and Worcestershire only needed two runs to win. The players left the field for the ten-minute break between innings, and when they returned Glenn Turner and Alan Ormrod opened Worcestershire's batting. Colin Dredge bowled the first over for Somerset, and Turner scored one run from it. Keith Jennings bowled the second over, and Turner scored a single from the fourth delivery which gave Worcestershire the victory.

Play lasted for just 18 minutes (of which 10 minutes were the interval between innings) and 16 legal deliveries. There were around 100 spectators at the ground, but many others were just arriving or still travelling when the match ended. Charles Burnett was supposed to select the man of the match, but in light of the nature of the game, he decided that it would not be appropriate to make such a selection.

=== Scorecard ===
- Toss: Somerset won the toss and elected to bat first
- Result: Worcestershire won by ten wickets

Somerset batting innings
Batsman	Method of dismissal	Runs
Brian Rose *	not out	0
Peter Denning	not out	0
Extras	(1 no-ball)	1
Totals	(1.0 overs)	1/0 dec.
Did not bat: Peter Roebuck, Viv Richards, Ian Botham, Vic Marks, Dennis Breakwell, Derek Taylor †, Hallam Moseley, Colin Dredge, Keith Jennings

Worcestershire bowling
Bowler	Overs	Maidens	Runs	Wickets	Economy
Vanburn Holder	1	1	0	0	0.00

Worcestershire batting innings
Batsman	Method of dismissal	Runs
Glenn Turner	not out	2
Alan Ormrod	not out	0
Extras		0
Totals	(1.4 overs)	2/0
Did not bat: Phil Neale, Ted Hemsley, Younis Ahmed, Dipak Patel, David Humphries †, Vanburn Holder, John Inchmore, Norman Gifford *, Paul Pridgeon

Somerset bowling
Bowler	Overs	Maidens	Runs	Wickets	Economy
Colin Dredge	1	0	1	0	1.00
Keith Jennings	0.4	0	1	0	1.50

Umpires:

- Terry Spencer and Jack van Geloven

Key

- * – Captain
- † – Wicket-keeper

== Reaction and aftermath ==
Group A final positions
Team	P	W	L	NR	Pts
Somerset	4	3	1	0	9
Worcestershire	4	3	1	0	9
Glamorgan	4	2	1	1	7
Gloucestershire	4	1	3	0	3
Minor Counties	4	0	3	1	1

=== Immediate reaction ===
The small crowd at the ground were angered by the result, such that Worcestershire's secretary Mike Vockins apologised and gave all those present a full refund, describing Somerset's declaration as "an absolute disgrace". Some Somerset fans had travelled over 150 miles (240 km) to watch the game; Alan Gibson of The Times had just arrived at the railway station when he was told by a porter that he might as well head back as the match had finished. The Somerset team left the ground 14 minutes after the end of the game and, as they were leaving, a Worcestershire fan banged on Rose's car window and shouted at him, "You've done a terrible thing for cricket."

The wet weather that delayed the match continued for most of the week, leaving the newspaper cricket journalists with little to write about other than the "Worcester affair". Some speculated that the Somerset players had placed bets on Worcestershire winning. John Arlott of The Guardian contended that Rose "did not infringe them [the rules of the competition], he exploited them". His newspaper blamed the action on the TCCB, suggesting that the rules, not the players, were to blame. The Daily Telegraph's Tony Winlaw was scathing, suggesting that cricket had reached one of its lowest points due to Rose's declaration. Gordon Ross, writing in The Cricketer, was similarly hard on Somerset, saying that although the team had won, the game of cricket, along with its supporters and sponsors, had lost. In their end-of-year summary, the Wisden Cricketers' Almanack was disdainful of the declaration, writing that Rose had "sacrificed all known cricketing principles by deliberately losing the game". Despite this condemnation, Rose was still named as one of five Wisden Cricketers of the Year, primarily for captaining Somerset to their first major honours.

Rose defended his actions, claiming that he had no other option, and that his "first duty is to Somerset. If anybody wishes to complain, he should do it to the people who make the rules." Somerset's president, Colin Atkinson, spoke to representatives from Worcestershire the day after the game and offered a replay, but his suggestion was rejected because of logistical issues and fixture congestion. The TCCB chairman, Carr, made a statement after the game that "Somerset's action is totally contrary to the spirit of the competition, but is not in breach of the rules as they are written" and announced that an inquiry would be held at season's end. Owing to the strength and number of complaints, a special meeting of the TCCB was called for 1 June. At that meeting, Somerset were ejected from the competition by seventeen votes to one; only the representative from Derbyshire opposed it, and even Somerset voted for the expulsion, saying Rose would have his position as captain reviewed. As a result of Somerset's ejection, Glamorgan joined Worcestershire in the quarter-finals. If Somerset had played the game as normal, they would have qualified: Glamorgan's match against the Minor Counties ended with no result because of rain, leaving them two points behind Somerset and Worcestershire.

Although Atkinson initially gave a public apology, and stated that the declaration could not be defended, he later suggested that Somerset were victims of a kangaroo court, and that the meeting had happened at a point when the topic was still emotive and people wanted retribution. Kerslake, the Somerset chairman, offered to resign, and Rose considered doing likewise; both eventually continued in their roles. The Somerset players, who felt that the press treated them like criminals, were concerned about the reception they might receive at their next match, a home fixture against Hampshire. In the event, the team were cheered onto the pitch; Rose was given an individual standing ovation when he batted. A few supporters at the match hung out a banner stating "It's Brian Rose I do declare!"

=== Later aftermath ===
Somerset went on to win the Gillette Cup and John Player League that season, while Worcestershire were eliminated from the Benson & Hedges Cup in the quarter-finals by Surrey. The organising committee of the 1979 Cricket World Cup, which was held in England, met in early June and decided that declarations would not be allowed during the tournament to prevent a repeat of the incident. The laws of cricket were subsequently altered to ban declarations in one-day cricket. Arlott suggested that the strong action taken by the TCCB meant that it was unlikely that captains would seek to exploit any loopholes in the future. David Frith, writing for Wisden Cricket Monthly, was similarly hopeful that the action taken would prevent any further instances of poor sportsmanship.

Another incident occurred in Welsh club cricket in 2017, when Carew Cricket Club declared their final match of the season on 18 for one. They had worked out that a loss would still result in them winning the league as long as their opponents, who were second in the league, did not score any batting or bowling bonus points. Carew retained their victory over Pembroke County Cricket Club and their league title, but a league disciplinary committee decided to relegate the team, imposed a £300 fine, and suspended their captain for the start of the following season.

== See also ==
- Match fixing – including scenarios in which teams or players perform poorly to gain a future advantage

== Bibliography ==
- Booth, Lawrence (2007). Arm-ball to Zooter: A Sideways Look at the Language of Cricket. London: Penguin Books. p. PT75. ISBN 978-0-141-90592-1 – via Google Books.
- Foot, David (1986). Sunshine, Sixes and Cider: The History of Somerset Cricket. Newton Abbot, Devon: David & Charles. ISBN 978-0-7153-8890-7.
- Marks, Vic (1984). Somerset County Cricket Scrapbook. London: Souvenir Press Ltd. ISBN 978-0-285-62631-7.
- Preston, Norman, ed. (1980). Wisden Cricketers' Almanack 1980 (117 ed.). London: Queen Anne Press. ISBN 978-0-362-02002-1.
- Roebuck, Peter (1991). From Sammy to Jimmy: The Official History of Somerset County Cricket Club. London: Partridge Press. ISBN 185225-0852.
- Roebuck, Peter (2004). Sometimes I Forgot to Laugh. Crows Nest, New South Wales: Allen & Unwin. ISBN 978-1-74114-389-8.
