= 1979 Gillette Cup final =

1979 Gillette Cup Final
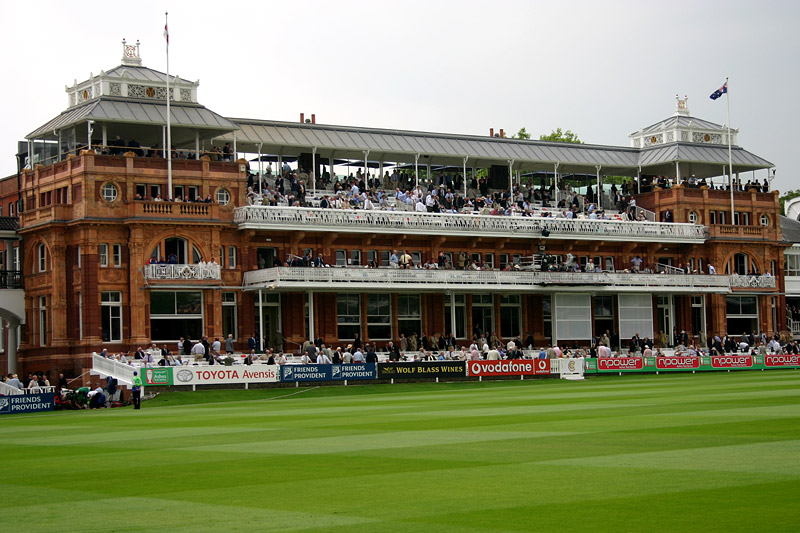
- Event: 1979 Gillette Cup
Somerset	Northamptonshire
269/8	224
60 overs	56.3 overs
- Somerset won by 45 runs
- Date: 8 September 1979
- Venue: Lord's, London
- Player of the match: Viv Richards
- Umpires: David Constant and John Langridge
- Attendance: 25,000

The 1979 Gillette Cup Final was a cricket match between Somerset County Cricket Club and Northamptonshire County Cricket Club played on 8 September 1979 at Lord's in London. It was the seventeenth final of the Gillette Cup, which had been the first English domestic knock-out competition between first-class teams. Northamptonshire had won the competition in 1976; Somerset were playing their second consecutive final, having lost to Sussex in 1978.

After winning the toss, Northamptonshire captain Jim Watts opted to bowl first. Somerset scored 269 runs off their full allocation of 60 overs, during which West Indian batsman Viv Richards top-scored for the county, totalling 117 runs. In their response, Northamptonshire lost early wickets, but a partnership of 113 between Geoff Cook and Allan Lamb kept them in the game. Six wickets from Joel Garner helped Somerset bowl their opponents out for 224 with 3.3 overs remaining, earning the county the first trophy in their 104-year history.

== Background ==
Northamptonshire's only previous Gillette Cup Final appearance had come three summers earlier when they beat Lancashire by four wickets to win the 1976 Gillette Cup, which was the club's only silverware since becoming a first-class county in 1905. Somerset had appeared in two previous finals, losing in 1967 to Kent, and in 1978 to Sussex. In addition to losing the Gillette Cup final in 1978, Somerset had narrowly missed out in the John Player League, and according to Vic Marks, there was "a deep determination to atone for the acute disappointments of the 1978 season."

== Route to the final ==
Northamptonshire entered the competition in the second round, in which they were matched up against Surrey County Cricket Club. They won the match by six wickets, aided by a century from Geoff Cook which earned him the man of the match award. In the quarter-finals, they beat Leicestershire by eight wickets, with particularly economical bowling from Sarfraz Nawaz and Richard Williams helping to limit their opponents to 180, a total which Northamptonshire reached with 4.2 overs to spare. Northamptonshire batted first during their semi-final against Sussex, a match which they won by 37 runs. Allan Lamb and Peter Willey shared a partnership of 157 for the fourth wicket, and Willey's economical bowling was then instrumental in restricting Sussex to 218, for which he was named man of the match.

Like their opponents in the final, Somerset joined the tournament in the second round, facing Derbyshire. Bowling first, Somerset limited their opponents to 224; Joel Garner was their most economical bowler. In reply, Somerset captain and opening batsman Brian Rose remained not out on 88 when his team reached their winning target with 3.5 overs remaining, having lost two wickets. Kent travelled to Taunton for the quarter-final, in which Somerset chose to bat first after winning the toss. Only Graham Burgess reached a half-century for Somerset against a bowling attack which included five Test players. In Kent's reply, Garner claimed five wickets and Ian Botham three as Somerset bowled their opponents out for 60 runs. Against Middlesex in the semi-final, Somerset's bowlers were once again led by Garner, who picked up four wickets as the London-based club were dismissed for 185. Somerset won with 9.4 overs remaining for the loss of three wickets and Peter Denning remained unbeaten on 90.

== Match ==
=== Summary ===
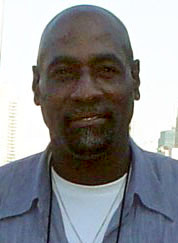
Viv Richards earned the man of the match accolade, top-scoring with 117 runs for Somerset

The sun was shining on the morning of the final, and Somerset's captain Brian Rose was glad when Northamptonshire won the toss. The conditions favoured batting first, but had Somerset won the toss they would most likely have chosen to bat second, given their success in chasing throughout the season. Northamptonshire captain Jim Watts opted to field, giving Somerset the benefit of batting first. Somerset's opening batsmen began quickly, taking the score to 34 before Peter Denning was caught by the wicket-keeper George Sharp off the bowling of Sarfraz Nawaz. His wicket in the seventh over brought in Viv Richards. Before going out to bat, Richards focussed his mind on the fact that "it wasn't a day for daring, carefree sixes. It was a day for maturity". Rose played a patient innings for his 41 runs, before being bowled by Watts, leaving Somerset 95/2. At the other end, Richards was playing what David Foot described as "a controlled gem". He remained at the wicket until the final over, scoring 117 runs in a chanceless innings. His boundaries were scored predominantly from straight drives and leg hits, powerfully struck. Ian Botham played aggressively when he came in at number five, scoring 27 runs off 17 deliveries, and Joel Garner played similarly when he batted towards the end of the innings, adding 24 runs to the total. Somerset batted through their full allocation of overs, finishing on 269/8. Of the Northamptonshire bowlers, Watts was the most economical, conceding 34 runs off his 12 overs. Tim Lamb conceded the most, allowing 70 runs to be scored from his 12. The wickets were shared by the bowlers; Watts, Lamb and Griffiths took two each, while Sarfraz Nawaz and Peter Willey claimed one apiece. Towards the end of the innings, Watts broke a bone in his right hand when catching a throw from the outfield, which prevented him from participating further in the match.

The Northamptonshire reply was made more difficult when Garner trapped Wayne Larkins leg before wicket and induced Richard Williams to hit his own wicket during his opening bowling spell. Opening batsman Geoff Cook was then joined at the crease by Allan Lamb, and the pair fought back, adding 113 runs in 32 overs before Cook was run out by Roebuck. In his history of Somerset cricket, Roebuck describes this run out as vital, though he does not give himself credit, stating that "Geoff Cook ran himself out". Marks identified the point at which Lamb was stumped by Derek Taylor as the point at which "victory was almost assured." Jim Yardley and George Sharp added 20 and 22 runs respectively, but with their captain, Watts, unable to bat through injury, and Somerset's West Indian fast bowler Garner in good form, Northamptonshire were bowled out for 224. Garner added four more wickets to the two he had taken during his first spell, to finish with career-best figures of six wickets for 29 runs. Garner, Botham and Keith Jennings all bowled very economically, each restricting their opponents to less than 30 runs from their bowling. Somerset won the match by 45 runs, winning the Gillette Cup, the first trophy they had won during their 104-year history.

=== Scorecard ===
Somerset County Cricket Club batting innings
Batsman	Method of dismissal	Runs	Balls	Strike-rate
Brian Rose *	b Watts	41	83	49.40
Peter Denning	c Sharp b Sarfraz Nawaz	19	21	90.48
Viv Richards	b Griffiths	117	136	86.03
Peter Roebuck	b Willey	14	52	26.92
Ian Botham	b TM Lamb	27	17	158.82
Vic Marks	b Griffiths	9	17	52.94
Graham Burgess	c Sharp b Watts	1	4	25.00
Dennis Breakwell	b TM Lamb	5	9	55.56
Joel Garner	not out	24	26	92.31
Derek Taylor †	not out	1	1	100.00
Keith Jennings	did not bat	–	–	–
Extras	(5 byes, 3 leg-byes, 3 no-balls)	11		
Totals	(60 overs)	269/8		

Northamptonshire County Cricket Club bowling
Bowler	Overs	Maidens	Runs	Wickets	Economy
Sarfraz Nawaz	12	3	51	1	4.25
Jim Griffiths	12	1	58	2	4.83
Jim Watts	12	2	34	2	2.83
Tim Lamb	12	0	70	2	5.83
Peter Willey	12	2	45	1	3.75

Northamptonshire County Cricket Club batting innings
Batsman	Method of dismissal	Runs	Balls	Strike-rate
Geoff Cook	run out	44	97	45.36
Wayne Larkins	lbw Garner	0	5	0.00
Richard Williams	hit wkt Garner	8	8	100.00
Allan Lamb	st Taylor b Richards	78	127	61.42
Peter Willey	c Taylor b Garner	5	15	33.33
Jim Yardley	c Richards b Burgess	20	34	58.82
George Sharp †	b Garner	22	30	73.33
Sarfraz Nawaz	not out	16	21	76.19
Tim Lamb	b Garner	4	8	50.00
Jim Griffiths	b Garner	0	2	0.00
Jim Watts *	absent hurt	–	–	–
Extras	(6 byes, 9 leg-byes, 7 no-balls, 5 wides)	27		
Totals	(56.3 overs)	224		

Somerset County Cricket Club bowling
Bowler	Overs	Maidens	Runs	Wickets	Economy
Joel Garner	10.3	3	29	6	2.76
Ian Botham	10	3	27	0	2.70
Keith Jennings	12	1	29	0	2.42
Graham Burgess	9	1	37	1	4.11
Vic Marks	4	0	22	0	5.50
Viv Richards	9	0	44	1	4.89
Dennis Breakwell	2	0	9	0	4.50

== Aftermath ==
Somerset were awarded £5,500 for winning the competition, while Northamptonshire collected £2,500. The day after their success in the Gillette Cup Final, Somerset travelled to Nottingham, where they beat Nottinghamshire to clinch the 1979 John Player League. The Somerset captain, Brian Rose was one of two Somerset players to be named as a Wisden Cricketer of the Year in 1980, primarily for his captaincy of Somerset during the 1979 season. Also one of the five players was Joel Garner, of whom Wisden said "His part in Somerset's double success during 1979 admits no arguments as to his potent and continuing ability to swing matches." Northamptonshire were eliminated in the first round of the 1980 Gillette Cup, but won the 1980 Benson & Hedges Cup, defeating Essex in the final.

== Bibliography ==
- Foot, David (1986). Sunshine, Sixes and Cider: The History of Somerset Cricket. Newton Abbot, Devon: David & Charles. ISBN 0-7153-8890-8.
- Marks, Vic (1984). Somerset County Cricket Scrapbook. London: Souvenir Press Ltd. ISBN 0-285-62631-0.
- Roebuck, Peter (1991). From Sammy to Jimmy: The Official History of Somerset County Cricket Club. London: Partridge Press. ISBN 1-85225-085-2.
