= 1978 Benson & Hedges Cup =

- Administrator: Test and County Cricket Board
- Cricket format: Limited overs cricket (55 overs per innings)
- Champions: Kent (3rd title)
- Participants: 20
- Matches: 47
- Most runs: 349 – Alan Hill (Derbyshire)
- Most wickets: 18 – Eddie Barlow (Derbyshire); 18 – Wayne Daniel (Middlesex)

The 1978 Benson & Hedges Cup was the seventh edition of cricket's Benson & Hedges Cup. The competition was won by Kent County Cricket Club.

== Results ==
=== Group stage ===
==== Group A ====
Team	Pld	W	L	NR	A	Pts	BowSR
Derbyshire	4	4	0	0	0	12	40.719
Warwickshire	4	3	1	0	0	9	36.636
Lancashire	4	2	2	0	0	6	46.143
Gloucestershire	4	1	3	0	0	3	38.727
Minor Counties West	4	0	4	0	0	0	51.667

==== Group B ====
Team	Pld	W	L	NR	A	Pts	BowSR
Somerset	4	3	0	0	1	10	31.556
Glamorgan	4	3	1	0	0	9	36.629
Hampshire	4	2	1	0	1	7	37.87
Worcestershire	4	1	3	0	0	3	37.667
Oxford and Cambridge Universities	4	0	4	0	0	0	80.154

==== Group C ====
Team	Pld	W	L	NR	A	Pts	BowSR
Sussex	4	3	1	0	0	9	26.344
Middlesex	4	3	1	0	0	9	30.912
Leicestershire	4	3	1	0	0	9	38.529
Northamptonshire	4	1	3	0	0	3	44.407
Minor Counties East	4	0	4	0	0	0	49.208

==== Group D ====
Team	Pld	W	L	NR	A	Pts	BowSR
Kent	4	3	1	0	0	9	46.25
Nottinghamshire	4	2	1	1	0	7	43.043
Surrey	4	2	1	1	0	7	48.92
Yorkshire	4	1	3	0	0	3	31.242
Essex	4	1	3	0	0	3	54.632

=== Quarter-finals ===
7, 8 June 1978
Scorecard

Derbyshire; 154 all out (52 overs)	v	Middlesex; 125 all out (48.4 overs)
Alan Hill 69; Mike Selvey 2/26 (10 overs)		Mike Gatting 50; Eddie Barlow 3/22 (7.4 overs)

Derbyshire won by 29 runs
County Ground, Derby
Umpires: Ray Julian & Tom Spencer
Player of the match: Eddie Barlow (Derbyshire)

- Reserve day used. Derbyshire were 11/0 (6 overs) at the close of the scheduled day's play.

7 June 1978
Scorecard

Nottinghamshire; 209/7 (55 overs)	v	Kent; 210/3 (49 overs)
Derek Randall 51; Bob Woolmer 2/32 (10 overs)		Alan Ealham 60*; Kevin Cooper 1/23 (11 overs)

Kent won by 7 wickets
St Lawrence Ground, Canterbury
Umpires: John Langridge & Alan Whitehead
Player of the match: Alan Ealham (Kent)

7, 8 June 1978
Scorecard

Somerset; 218/9 (55 overs)	v	Sussex; 116 all out (42.2 overs)
Ian Botham 54; John Spencer 3/37 (11 overs)		Jeremy Groome 28; Keith Jennings 3/20 (11 overs)

Somerset won by 102 runs
County Ground, Hove
Umpires: David Constant & David Halfyard
Player of the match: Ian Botham (Somerset)

- Reserve day used. Sussex were 76/6 (30 overs) at the close of the scheduled day's play.

7, 8 June 1978
Scorecard

Warwickshire; 205/6 (55 overs)	v	Glamorgan; 159 all out (49.2 overs)
John Whitehouse 70; Rodney Ontong 2/21 (8 overs)		John Hopkins 26; Stephen Rouse 3/28 (8.2 overs)

Warwickshire won by 46 runs
Edgbaston, Birmingham
Umpires: Cec Pepper & Dusty Rhodes
Player of the match: John Whitehouse (Warwickshire)

- Reserve day used. No play first day.

=== Semi-finals ===
21, 22 June 1978
Scorecard

Derbyshire; 203/9 (55 overs)	v	Warwickshire; 162 all out (50.4 overs)
Anthony Borrington 77; Bob Willis 3/30 (11 overs)		Geoff Humpage 78; Eddie Barlow 3/26 (6.4 overs)

Derbyshire won by 41 runs
County Ground, Derby
Umpires: Bill Alley & Ken Palmer
Player of the match: Anthony Borrington (Derbyshire)

- Reserve day used. Derbyshire were 119/2 (36.5 overs) at the close of the scheduled day's play.

21, 22, 23 June 1978
Scorecard

Kent; 204/8 (55 overs)	v	Somerset; 163 all out (51.2 overs)
Chris Tavaré 56; Ian Botham 3/39 (11 overs)		Brian Rose 48; Asif Iqbal 3/49 (9 overs)

Kent won by 41 runs
County Ground, Taunton
Umpires: Lloyd Budd & Tom Spencer
Player of the match: Chris Tavaré (Kent)

- Two reserve days used. Kent were 149/5 (41.2 overs) at the close of the scheduled day's play, and Somerset were 33/1 (13 overs) at the close of the second day's play.

=== Final ===
22 July 1978
Scorecard

Derbyshire; 147 all out (54.4 overs)	v	Kent; 151/4 (41.4 overs)
Peter Kirsten 41; John Shepherd 4/25 (11 overs)		Bob Woolmer 79; Philip Russell 3/28 (11 overs)

Kent won by 6 wickets
Lord's, London
Umpires: David Constant & John Langridge
Player of the match: Bob Woolmer (Kent)

== See also ==
- Benson & Hedges Cup
