= Match fixing =

Collusion to secretly predetermine the outcome of a sports match

In organized sports, match fixing (also known as game fixing, race fixing, throwing, rigging, hippodroming, or more generally sports fixing) is the act of playing or officiating a contest with the intention of achieving a predetermined result, violating the rules of the game and often the law. There are many reasons why match fixing might take place, including receiving bribes from bookmakers or sports bettors, and blackmail. Competitors may also intentionally perform poorly to gain a future advantage, such as a better draft pick or to face an easier opponent in a later round of competition. A player might also play poorly to rig a handicap system.

Match fixing, when motivated by gambling, requires contacts (and normally money transfers) between gamblers, players, team officials, and/or referees. These contacts and transfers can sometimes be discovered, and lead to prosecution by the law or the sports league(s). In contrast, losing for future advantage is internal to the team and very difficult to prove. Often, substitutions made by a coach, designed to deliberately increase the team's chances of losing (such as having key players sit out, often using minimal or phantom injuries as an excuse), rather than ordering the players who are actually on the field to intentionally underperform, are cited as the main factor in cases where this has been alleged.

Match fixing includes point shaving and spot-fixing, which center on smaller events within a match that can be wagered upon but are unlikely to prove decisive in determining the game's final result. According to Sportradar, a company that monitors the integrity of sports events on behalf of sports federations, as many as one percent of the matches they monitor show suspicious betting patterns that may be indicative of match fixing. In sports where a handicap or ranking system exists and is capable of being abused (including sports such as racing, grappling and golf), throwing the game is known as "sandbagging". Hustling, where a player disguises his abilities until he can play for large amounts of money, is a common practice in many cue sports, such as nine-ball pool.

== Motivations and causes ==
Some major motivations behind match fixing are gambling and team advantages. According to investigative journalist Declan Hill it has also been linked to corruption, violence and tax avoidance. In Eastern Europe, organized crime is linked to illegal gambling and score fixing. In Russia, people have disappeared or been murdered after acting against bribery in sports.

=== Agreements with gamblers ===
There may be financial gain through agreements with gamblers. The Black Sox Scandal of 1919 involved several members of the MLB's Chicago White Sox conspiring with gamblers to fix that year's World Series for monetary gain. One of the best-known examples of gambling-related race fixing (in motorsports) is the 1933 Tripoli Grand Prix, in which the winning number of the lottery was determined by the number of the race-winning car. One ticket holder, who held the number belonging to Achille Varzi, contacted him and agreed to share the winning should he win. Varzi contacted other drivers who agreed to share the money if they deliberately lost. Despite a poor start, Varzi won the race after his opponents deliberately underperformed throughout the race. A large match-fixing ring in the lower levels of professional tennis, centered around gambling, was broken up in 2023. At least 181 players were involved. A similar organized effort in Chinese and NCAA basketball was uncovered in 2026. In June 2026, former Detroit Pistons play Malik Beasley was indicted on federal charges related to an alleged sports-related scheme.

=== Competitive advantage ===
Match fixing can also occur when teams or athletes manipulate the outcome of a match to gain a strategic or competitive advantage rather than direct financial benefit. In such cases, the aim may be to influence standings, improve seeding, or create conditions that benefit a particular competitor. In sports such as Formula One, where each team fields two drivers, teams have at times used one driver to create a strategic advantage for the other. While team orders themselves are not inherently match fixing, controversies such as Crashgate demonstrate how the pursuit of competitive advantage can motivate deliberate manipulation of a sporting event. In this case, Renault driver Nelson Piquet Jr. was instructed to crash deliberately, exploiting the safety car rule to benefit his teammate Fernando Alonso, enabling him to win the 2008 Singapore Grand Prix.

=== Better playoff chances ===
Many sports have tournaments where the result of one round determines their opponent in the next round. As a result, by losing a match, a team can face an easier opponent in the next round, making them more likely to win. The National Basketball Association (NBA) is the only one of the four major professional sports leagues of the United States and Canada in which home advantage in the playoffs is based strictly on regular-season records without regard to seeding. The top six teams earn an automatic playoff berth, while the seventh through tenth teams compete for the last two seeds in a "play-in tournament".

In the Canadian Football League, since the introduction of the cross-over rule, Western teams have been occasionally accused of losing near the end of the season in situations where a loss would cause them to finish fourth place in their division and where such a finish was still good enough to secure a berth in the league's East Division playoffs. In recent years, the East has often been viewed to be a weaker division than the West; however, if any Western team has attempted such a strategy, it has not paid significant dividends for them since teams who qualify for the playoffs via crossover have gone a combined 5–7 in the East Division Semi-Finals, and 0–5 in the East Division Finals. As of the 2022 season, no Western team has advanced to the Grey Cup championship game from the Eastern bracket. An earlier example of possible match fixing occurred in the ice hockey competition at the 2006 Winter Olympics. In Pool B, Sweden was to face Slovakia in the last pool match for both teams. Sweden coach Bengt-Åke Gustafsson publicly contemplated losing against Slovakia, knowing that if his team won, their quarterfinal opponent would either be Canada, the 2002 gold medalists, or the Czech Republic, 1998 gold medalists. Gustafsson would tell Swedish television "One is cholera, the other the plague." Sweden lost the match 3–0; the most obvious sign of match fixing was when Sweden had a five-on-three powerplay with five NHL stars – Peter Forsberg, Mats Sundin, Daniel Alfredsson, Nicklas Lidström, and Fredrik Modin – on the ice, and failed to put a shot on goal. (Sports Illustrated writer Michael Farber would say about this particular powerplay, "If the Swedes had passed the puck anymore, their next opponent would have been the Washington Generals.") If he was seeking to tank, Gustafsson got his wish; Sweden would face a much less formidable quarterfinal opponent in Switzerland. Canada would lose to Russia in a quarterfinal in the opposite bracket, while Sweden went on to win the gold medal, defeating the Czechs in the semifinals.

The 1998 Tiger Cup – an international football tournament contested by countries in Southeast Asia – saw an example of two teams trying to lose a match. The tournament was hosted by Vietnam, with the eight countries competing split into two groups of four. The top two in each group advanced to the semi-finals with the winners playing the runners-up of the other group. In the first group, Singapore finished on top with Vietnam finishing second; this meant that the winners of the second group would have to travel to Hanoi to play the host nation in the national stadium on their national day, while the runners-up would face Singapore in Ho Chi Minh City where the final group match was taking place. As the two teams involved – Thailand and Indonesia – had both already qualified for the semi-finals, it was in both teams' interest to lose the match and finish in second place. As the game progressed, neither side seemed particularly concerned with scoring, while the defending was lackadaisical. As the match entered stoppage time, Indonesian defender Mursyid Effendi scored an own goal, overcoming the efforts of several Thai players and the goalkeeper to stop him. Both teams were fined $40,000, and Effendi was banned from international football for life.

In the final month of the 2010 Major League Baseball season, the New York Yankees and Tampa Bay Rays were in a tight race for the American League East division title and by the final week, both teams had already clinched at least the wild card. The Yankees went 3–7 over the final 10 games, losing their regular-season finale, while the Rays went 5–5 and won theirs, giving the Rays the AL East title by one game and the Yankees the AL wild-card berth. Winning the division would have given New York an ALDS matchup against the Texas Rangers, who at the time had star pitcher Cliff Lee; the Yankees instead defeated the Minnesota Twins, a team they historically have had more postseason success against. Allegations of the Yankees purposefully settling for the wild card, presumably to avoid facing Texas in the ALDS, began to surface after the Yankees defeated the Twins. Additional allegations came up in 2012 when Yankees general manager Brian Cashman commented in response to a possible playoff expansion that his team had "conceded the division" and that winning it meant "nothing more than a T-shirt and a hat". However, Cashman insisted that the Yankees were not motivated by any desire to lose games, but were merely ensuring their best players were well-rested for the postseason, which he contended was perfectly ethical behavior. In 2012, Major League Baseball added a second wild card in each league, with the two wild cards playing a single-elimination game in order to give more importance to winning the division. In 2022, the postseason was further expanded, adding a third wild card and making the round a best-of-three series. The 2012 Summer Olympics saw two examples of match fixing of this type:

- Members of four badminton teams from China, Indonesia and South Korea were ejected from the women's doubles tournament for intentionally losing matches to allow better pairings in the knockout stages of the competition. In what the BBC called a "night of shame", players made simple errors throughout the match, despite booing and jeering from the crowd, and warnings from the match umpire and tournament referee to cease and desist. The Badminton World Federation found the four pairs guilty of "not using one's best efforts to win a match" and "conducting oneself in a manner that is clearly abusive or detrimental to the sport."
- In the women's football tournament, Japan intentionally played a draw with South Africa in Cardiff, allowing it to finish second in its group so it would not have to travel to Glasgow, more than 300 miles away, for the first round of the knockout stage. Instead, Japan remained in Cardiff and defeated Brazil in their quarterfinal en route to the gold medal match.

Match fixing can also happen in high-school level sports. For example, In February 2015, two girls' basketball teams representing Nashville-area Riverdale and Smyrna High Schools were both intentionally trying to lose during a consolation match of their district tournament. The winner of the game would enter the same side of the regional tournament bracket as defending state champion Blackman High School (ranked as one of the country's top 10 teams by some national publications), setting up a potential match in the regional semifinals. The loser would thus avoid Blackman until the regional final, a game whose participants would both advance to the sectional tournament (one step short of the state tournament). During the game both teams pulled their starters early, missed shots on purpose, intentionally turned over the ball and deliberately committed fouls. The Tennessee Secondary School Athletic Association, which governs high school sports in the state, ejected both teams from the postseason, fined the two schools (Riverdale $1,000 and Smyrna $500), and placed both teams on probation through the 2015–16 school year.

As previously mentioned, the practice of coaches on a playoff-bound team deliberately benching a team's best players for some or all of the final match(es) of the regular season (or alternatively, giving them less playing time than would normally be warranted) is often defended as a common sense measure to avoid unnecessarily risking injuries and fatigue to the team's star players. Some argue that a coach should not only have the right to select a starting lineup for a match that gives the team the best chances of winning titles in the long run — should this be a different lineup than the one that gives the team the best chances of winning the game at hand — but that doing so is the smartest course of action. For example, during Euro 2004 the Czech Republic rested nearly all of its starters from the first two group matches for the final group match against Germany. Since the Czechs had already clinched first place in the group, this move was seen to have the potential to allow Germany a better chance to get the win they needed to advance at the expense of the winner of the Netherlands–Latvia game. As it happened, the Czechs' decision to field a "weaker" side did not matter since the Czechs won the match anyway to eliminate the Germans.

=== Better draft position ===
Most top-level sports leagues in North America and Australia hold drafts to allocate young players to the league's teams. The order in which teams select players is often the inverse of their standings in the previous season. As a result, a team may have a significant incentive to tank games to secure a higher pick in the league's next draft, and a number of leagues have changed their draft rules to remove (or at least limit) potential incentives to tank. From 1966 to 1984, the NBA used a coin flip between the teams with the worst records in each of the league's two conferences to determine the recipient of the top pick. In the 1983–84 season, several teams were accused of deliberately losing games in an attempt to gain a top position in the 1984 draft, which would eventually produce four Hall of Fame players. As a result of this, the NBA established a draft lottery in advance of the 1985 draft, involving all teams that did not make the playoffs in the previous season. This lottery system prevented teams from receiving fixed draft positions based on record place, which the league hoped would discourage them from deliberately losing.

Even though the lottery in place through the 2018 draft gave the team with the worst record only the same chance at the top pick as the 2nd and 3rd worst teams (with that team guaranteed no worse than the fourth pick), there was still perceived incentive for a team to tank. Responding to these perceived incentives, the NBA further tweaked its lottery rules shortly before the start of the 2017–18 season. Effective with the 2019 draft, the teams with the three worst records have equal odds of landing the #1 pick (barring one of these teams also owning another lottery team's pick), and the top four picks are allocated in the lottery instead of the top three. This limits but does not eliminate the incentive to tank, particularly when there is at least one exceptional prospect.

The Australian Football League, the main competition of Australian rules football, has used a system of priority draft picks since 1993, with poorly performing teams receiving extra selections at or near the start of the draft. Prior to 2012, a team automatically received a priority pick if its win–loss record met pre-defined eligibility criteria. However, that system led to accusations of tanking by several clubs—most notably by Melbourne in 2009 (the club was found not guilty, but the head coach and general manager were found guilty on related charges). Since 2012, priority picks are awarded at the discretion of the AFL Commission, the governing body of both the AFL and the overall sport. Until the 2014–15 NHL season, the National Hockey League assured the last place team of at least the second position in its entry draft, with the first overall pick being subject to a draft lottery among the five worst teams. As NHL drafts typically include only one NHL-ready prospect, if any at all, in any given year (most others must continue developing in junior ice hockey or the minor leagues for several years before reaching the NHL), this rudimentary lottery has historically been enough of a deterrent to avoid deliberate tanking. However, in 2014–15, two elite prospects widely considered to be "generational talents", Connor McDavid and Jack Eichel, were projected to enter the 2015 NHL entry draft, thus ensuring the last place team at least one of the two prospects. This was most prominent with the Buffalo Sabres, whose fans openly rooted against their team in the hopes they would clinch last place in the league for much of the season (the Sabres themselves denied they were tanking and openly criticized their fans for suggesting the notion). Beginning in 2015–16, the top three picks in the draft are subject to lottery, with all fourteen teams that did not qualify for the playoffs eligible to win the picks. However, as the worst team is guaranteed one of the first three picks, tanking is still contemplated when the draft field is deep.

=== More favorable schedule next year ===
NFL teams have been accused of throwing games to obtain a more favorable schedule the following season; this was especially true between 1977 and 1993, when a team finishing last in a five-team division would get to play four of its eight non-division matches the next season against other last-place teams. In the current scheduling formula which has been in place since 2002 and slightly amended in 2021, only three games in a team's schedule are dependent on a team's placement the previous season. The remaining eight non-division games are the same for all teams in a division.

=== Match fixing by referees ===
In addition to the match fixing that is committed by players, coaches and/or team officials, it is not unheard of to have results manipulated by corrupt referees. Since 2004, separate scandals have erupted in prominent sports leagues in Portugal, Germany (Bundesliga scandal), Brazil (Brazilian football match-fixing scandal) and the United States (see Tim Donaghy scandal), all of which concerned referees who fixed matches for gamblers. Many sports writers have speculated that in leagues with high player salaries, it is far more likely for a referee to become corrupt since their pay in such competitions is usually much less than that of the players. On December 2, 1896, former Old West lawman Wyatt Earp refereed the Fitzsimmons vs. Sharkey boxing match, promoted as the Heavyweight Championship of the World. Earp was chosen as referee by the National Athletic Association the afternoon of the match after both managers refused to agree on a choice. In the eighth round of a fight dominated by Fitzsimmons, Sharkey suddenly went down, clutching his groin, yelling foul. Referee Earp conferred with both corners for a few seconds before he disqualified Fitzsimmons for a foul that virtually no one saw. Fitzsimmons went to court to attempt to stop Sharkey from taking the purse, but failed when the court ruled that the match was illegal and it had no jurisdiction.

Eight years later, B. Brookes Lee was arrested in Portland, Oregon. He had been accused of treating Sharkey to make it appear that he had been fouled by Fitzsimmons. Lee said, "I fixed Sharkey up to look as if he had been fouled. How? Well, that is something I do not care to reveal, but I will assert that it was done—that is enough. There is no doubt that Fitzsimmons was entitled to the decision and did not foul Sharkey. I got $1,000 for my part in the affair." One of the most recent and infamous cases of match fixing by referees in association football involved referee Ibrahim Chaibou from Niger, whom FIFA banned for life in January 2019 after an investigation proved that he had received bribes and fixed matches during many years, leading controversial games of high-stakes national teams where Chaibou made several controversial decisions.

=== Match fixing to a draw or a fixed score ===
Match fixing does not necessarily involve deliberately losing a match. Occasionally, teams have been accused of deliberately playing to a draw or a fixed score where this ensures some mutual benefit (e.g. both teams advancing to the next stage of a competition.) One of the earliest examples of this sort of match fixing in the modern era occurred in 1898 when Stoke City and Burnley intentionally drew in that year's final "test match" so as to ensure they were both in the First Division the next season. In response, the Football League expanded the divisions to 18 teams that year, thus permitting the intended victims of the fix (Newcastle United and Blackburn Rovers) to remain in the First Division. The "test match" system was abandoned and replaced with automatic relegation.

A more recent example occurred in the 1982 FIFA World Cup, West Germany played Austria in the last match of group B. A West German victory by 1 or 2 goals would result in both teams advancing; any less and Germany was out; any more and Austria was out (and replaced by Algeria, who had just beaten Chile). West Germany attacked hard and scored after 10 minutes. Afterwards, the players then proceeded to just kick the ball around aimlessly for the remainder of the match. Algerian supporters were so angered that they waved banknotes at the players, while a German fan burned his German flag in disgust. By the second half, the ARD commentator Eberhard Stanjek refused any further comment on the game, while the Austrian television commentator Robert Seeger advised viewers to switch off their sets. As a result, FIFA changed its tournament scheduling for subsequent World Cups so that the final pair of matches in each group are played simultaneously.

Another example took place on the next-to-last weekend of the 1992–93 Serie A season. Milan entered their match needing only a point to secure the title ahead of crosstown rivals Inter, while Brescia believed a point would be enough for them to avoid relegation. In a 2004 retrospective on the "dodgiest games" in football history, two British journalists said about the match, "For over 80 minutes, the two teams engaged in a shameful game of cat-and-mouse, in which the cat appeared to have fallen asleep and the mouse was on tranquilisers." Milan scored in the 82nd minute, but Brescia "mysteriously found themselves with a huge overlap" and equalised two minutes later. The 1–1 draw gave Milan their title, but in the end did not help Brescia; other results went against them and they suffered the drop.

In knockout competitions where the rules require drawn matches to be replayed, teams have sometimes been accused of intentionally playing one or more draws so as to ensure replays. In this case, the motive is usually financial since the ensuing replay(s) would typically be expected to generate additional revenue for the participating teams. One notorious example of this particular type of alleged fix was the 1909 Scottish Cup Final, which sparked a riot after being played twice to a draw.

=== Intentional loss to prejudice third-party rival ===
A team may deliberately lose a match, giving a victory to the opposing team that damages a third-party rival. An example of this occurred in Sevilla, Spain, during the 1999–2000 La Liga. Sevilla FC were in last place and were already officially relegated. In their thirty-fifth match of the season (out of 38), Sevilla faced Real Oviedo of Asturias, which was itself fighting to avoid relegation. An Oviedo victory would put Sevilla's fierce cross-town rival, Real Betis, in the relegation zone. Sevilla performed poorly, while their fans showed support for Oviedo and expressed concern for missed scoring chances by the Asturian side. Oviedo defeated Sevilla 3–2, contributing to the eventual relegation of Betis. Twelve years later, former Sevilla goalkeeper Frode Olsen admitted the team had lost intentionally in order to relegate Betis.

Similarly, a National Football League (NFL) team has also been accused of throwing its final regular-season game in an attempt to keep a rival out of the playoffs. An alleged example of this was when the San Francisco 49ers, who had clinched a playoff berth, lost their regular-season finale in 1988 to the Los Angeles Rams, thereby knocking the New York Giants (who had defeated the 49ers in the playoffs in both 1985 and 1986, moreover injuring 49ers quarterback Joe Montana in the latter) out of the postseason on the intra-conference record tiebreaker; after the game, Giants quarterback Phil Simms angrily accused the 49ers of "laying down like dogs."

=== Increased gate receipts ===
In addition to the aforementioned incidents of alleged fixing of drawn matches to ensure replays, mutual fixes have sometimes been alleged in "best of X" knockout series where draws are either not possible or very uncommon. Early versions of baseball's World Series were a common target of such allegations. Because the players received a percentage of the gate receipts for postseason games (a privilege they did not enjoy in the regular season), there was a perception that the players had an incentive to fix an equal number of early games in favor of each team so as to ensure the series would run the maximum number of games (or very close thereto). Partly as an effort to avoid this sort of controversy, early World Series sometimes saw all scheduled games played even if the Series winner was already determined. That did not prove satisfactory since few fans were willing to pay to watch dead rubber contests. Eventually, following the controversy at the conclusion of the 1904 season in which the New York Giants boycotted the World Series in part because of dissatisfaction with the financial arrangements surrounding the Series, Major League Baseball agreed to a number of reforms proposed by Giants owner John T. Brush. Among other things, the so-called "Brush Rules" stipulated that the players would only receive a share of ticket revenue from the first four games, thus eliminating any financial incentive for the players to deliberately prolong the World Series.

=== Abuse of tie-breaking rules ===
On several occasions, creative use of tie-breaking rules have allegedly led teams to play less than their best. An example occurred in the 2004 European Football Championship. Unlike FIFA, UEFA takes the result of the game between the two tied teams (or in a three-way tie, the overall records of the games played with the teams in question only) into consideration before overall goal difference when ranking teams level on points. A situation arose in Group C where Sweden and Denmark played to a 2–2 draw, which was a sufficiently high scoreline to eliminate Italy (which had lower-scoring draws with the Swedes and Danes) regardless of Italy's result with already-eliminated Bulgaria. Although Italy beat Bulgaria by only one goal to finish level with Sweden and Denmark on five points and would hypothetically have been eliminated using the FIFA tie-breaker too, some Italian fans bitterly contended that the FIFA tie-breaker would have motivated their team to play harder and deterred their Scandinavian rivals from, in their view, at the very least half-heartedly playing out the match after the score became 2–2. The same situation happened to Italy in 2012, leading to many pre-game complaints from Italy, who many commentators suggested were right to be concerned because of their own extensive experience in this area. However, Spain-Croatia ended in a 1–0 win for Spain, and the Italians went through.

The FIFA tie-breaker, or any goal-differential scheme, can cause problems, too. There have been incidents (especially in basketball) where players on a favored team have won the game but deliberately ensured the quoted point spread was not covered (see point shaving). Conversely, there are cases where a team not only lost (which might be honest) but lost by some large amount, perhaps to ensure a point spread was covered, or to grant some non-gambling related favor to the victor. Perhaps the most famous alleged example was the match between Argentina and Peru in the 1978 FIFA World Cup. Argentina needed a four-goal victory over Peru in order to advance over Brazil, a large margin at this level of competition, yet Argentina won 6–0. Much was made over possible political collusion, that the Peruvian goalkeeper was born in Argentina, and that Peru was dependent on Argentinian grain shipments, but nothing was ever proven.

Tie-breaking rules played the central role in one of cricket's more notorious matches. In a 1979 match in England's now-defunct Benson & Hedges Cup, a one-day league, Worcestershire hosted Somerset in the final group match for both sides. Going into that match, Somerset led their group with three wins from three matches, but would end in a three-way tie for the top spot if they lost to Worcestershire and Glamorgan defeated the then-winless Minor Counties South. In that event, the tie-breaker would be bowling strike rate. The Somerset players calculated that a large enough loss could see them miss the quarter-finals. Accordingly, Somerset captain Brian Rose determined that if Somerset batted first and declared their innings closed after one over, they would protect their strike rate advantage, assuring advancement to the quarter-finals. When Somerset won the toss, Rose implemented the plan, batting in the first partnership and declaring at the close of the first over after Somerset scored only one run on a no-ball. Worcestershire won during their second over. Rose's strategy, although not against the letter of the rules, was condemned by media and cricket officials, and the Test and County Cricket Board (predecessor to the current England and Wales Cricket Board) voted to expel Somerset from that season's competition.

=== Prize sharing ===
A player can concede with the understanding that the opponent will share the prize equally with them. Depending on the game, this can lead to disqualification.

=== Protest action ===
On occasion, teams tank games as a protest against actions in earlier games. The most lopsided professional football match in history, AS Adema 149–0 SO l'Emyrne, was a result of SO l'Emyrne intentionally losing the game in protest against the referee's action in a previous game.

=== Conflicts of interest ===
Sometimes, match fixing may simply be motivated by ownership having controlling interests in two or more teams. In such circumstances, there is often incentive for the common owners' poorer team to deliberately lose to a championship contender, or at least to make roster and/or coaching decisions that increase the contenders' chances of winning. Such collusion is often not limited to individual games, rather, owners may deliberately try to transfer all of their best players to the more lucrative team. A particularly notorious example occurred in the 1899 Major League Baseball season when the owners of the Cleveland Spiders bought a more profitable team, the St. Louis Perfectos, and brazenly traded Cleveland's best players to St. Louis. The Spiders finished the season 20–134 (by far the worst record in MLB history) and were contracted after the season.

Modern major sports leagues usually prohibit such ownership arrangements. Where it is necessary or desirable for a single ownership group to control two teams, salary caps often limit the ability of owners to stack one roster at the expense of another. Typically, to forestall so much as any perception of impropriety, such teams will be prohibited from trading directly with each other and any head-to-head match(es) will usually be scheduled early in the season to ensure there are no obvious championship and/or playoff implications. An example of this arrangement occurred in the early 21st century in the Canadian Football League; between 2010 and 2015, the BC Lions and the Toronto Argonauts were owned by the same person.

=== Individual performance in team sports ===
Bookmakers in the early 21st century accept bets on a far wider range of sports-related propositions than ever before. Thus, a gambling-motivated fix might not necessarily involve any direct attempt to influence the outright result, especially in team sports in which such a fix would require the co-operation (and prerequisitely the knowledge) of many people, or would be more likely to arouse suspicion. Fixing the result of a more particular proposition might be seen as less likely to be noticed. For example, the disgraced former National Basketball Association referee Tim Donaghy has been alleged to have perpetrated some of his fixes by calling games in such a manner as to ensure more points than expected were scored by both teams, thus affecting "over–under" bets on the games whilst also ensuring that Donaghy at least did not look to be outright biased. Also, bets are increasingly being taken on individual performances in team sporting events, which, in turn, has seen the rise of a phenomenon known as spot fixing although it is now unlikely that enough is bet on average players to allow someone to place a substantial wager on them without being noticed.

One such attempt was described by retired footballer Matthew Le Tissier, who in 2009 admitted that while he was playing with Southampton FC back in 1995, he tried (and failed) to kick the ball out of play right after the kick-off of a Premier League match against Wimbledon FC so that a group of associates would collect on a wager made on an early throw-in. Likewise, a tennis pro was paid to make sure she lost her first service game. She was free to play normally for the rest of the match.

Similarly, in 2010, Pakistani cricket players were accused of committing specific no-ball penalties for the benefit of gamblers. The scandal centred on three Pakistani players accepting bribes from a bookmaker, Mazhar Majeed, during the Lord's test match against England. Following investigations by the News of the World and Scotland Yard, on 1 November 2011, Majeed, Pakistan's captain, Salman Butt, Mohammad Asif and Mohammad Amir were found guilty of conspiracy to cheat at gambling and to accept corrupt payments. As a result, all three of the players were banned by the International Cricket Council (ICC): Butt for ten years, Asif for seven and Amir for five. On 3 November 2011, jail terms were handed down of 30 months for Butt, one year for Asif, six months for Amir and two years eight months for Majeed.

=== Effect of non-gambling-motivated fixing on wagering ===
Whenever any serious motivation for teams to manipulate results becomes apparent to the general public, there can be a corresponding effect on betting markets as honest gamblers speculate in good faith as to the chance such a fix might be attempted. Some bettors might choose to avoid wagering on such a fixture while others will be motivated to wager on it, or alter the bet they would otherwise place. Such actions will invariably affect odds and point spreads even if there is no contact whatsoever between teams and the relevant gambling interests. The rise of betting exchanges has allowed such speculation to play out in real time.

== History ==
Evidence of match fixing has been found throughout recorded history, and the history of match fixing is closely related to the history of illegal gambling. The ancient Olympic Games were almost constantly dealing with allegations of athletes accepting bribes to lose a competition and city-states which often tried to manipulate the outcome with large amounts of money. These activities went on despite the oath each athlete took to protect the integrity of the events and the severe punishment sometimes inflicted on those who were caught. Chariot racing was also dogged by race fixing throughout its history.

By the end of the 19th century, gambling was illegal in most jurisdictions, but that did not stop its widespread practice. Boxing soon became rife with fighters "taking a dive", likely due to boxing being a sport involving individual competitors, which makes its matches much easier to fix without getting caught. Baseball also became plagued by match fixing despite efforts by the National League to stop gambling at its games. Matters finally came to a head in 1919 when eight members of the Chicago White Sox threw the World Series. In an effort to restore confidence, Major League Baseball established the office of the Commissioner of Baseball, and one of Kenesaw Mountain Landis's first acts was to ban all involved players for life.

MLB Rule 21 prohibits players from participating in any form of betting on baseball games, and a lifetime ban for betting on a player's own games. A poster with Rule 21 must be posted on all professional baseball clubhouses. In the 1990s, match fixing in Asia was especially common. In Malaysia, authorities suggested that 70% of football matches were being manipulated, and corruption scandals in China resulted in gamblers choosing to bet on overseas matches.

=== Sumo ===
Yaochō (八百長) is a Japanese word meaning a cheating activity which is committed at places where a match, fight, game, competition, or other contest, is held, where the winner and loser are decided in advance by agreement of the competitors or related people. It is believed that the word Yaocho came from the name ("Chobei") of the owner of a vegetable stand (yaoya) during the Meiji period. Created from the first syllable of Yaoya and chobei, the word yaocho was created as a nickname for Chobei. Chobei had a friend called "Isenoumi Godayu" (7th Isenoumi stablemaster) with whom he played the game Igo, who had once been a sumo wrestler "Kashiwado Sogoro" (former shikona: "Kyonosato") and now was a "toshiyori" (a stablemaster of sumo). Although Chobei was a better Igo player than Isenoumi, he sometimes lost games on purpose to please Isenoumi so that Isenoumi would continue to buy merchandise from his shop. Afterward, once people knew of his cheating, they started to use yaocho as a word meaning any decision to win/lose a match in advance by negotiation etc. with the expectation of secondary profit, even though the match seems to be held seriously and fairly.

Economists using statistical analysis have shown very strong evidence of bout fixing in sumo wrestling. Most of the motive for match fixing is helping each other's ranking to keep their salary higher, according to Keisuke Itai. For example, wrestlers in jūryō (the second tier) desperately try to avoid finishing the tournament with a losing record (7–8 or worse) and exchange or buy the match result, or their salary would be nothing, 0 yen, with the participation wage of 150,000 yen every two months if they finish the tournament with a losing record, and their ranking would go down to makushita (third level) and only participate in seven matches, the lesser ranking from jūryō in which one can earn 1,036,000 yen monthly with some prizes and a full 15-match tournament.

The sumo association appears to make a distinction between yaocho (the payment of money to secure a result) and koi-ni-yatta mukiryoku zumo (the deliberate performance of underpowered sumo in which an opponent simply lays a match down without exchange of money). The intricacies of Japanese culture, which include subordination of individual gain to the greater good and knowing how to read a situation without the exchange of words (I know my opponent's score, he needs help, and I should automatically give it to him) mean that the latter is almost readily accepted in the sumo world and is also nearly impossible to prove.

=== Cricket ===
Some of the most notorious instances of match fixing have been observed in international cricket. In 2000 the Delhi police intercepted a conversation between a blacklisted bookie and the South African cricket captain Hansie Cronje in which they learnt that Cronje accepted money to throw matches. A court of inquiry was set up and Cronje admitted to throwing matches. He was immediately banned from all cricket. He also named Saleem Malik (Pakistan), Mohammed Azharuddin and Ajay Jadeja (India) as fellow match fixers. Jadeja was banned for 4 years. Although Cronje was a kingpin of betting, following untimely death in 2002 most of his fixing partners escaped law enforcement agencies. Earlier in 1998, Australian players Mark Waugh and Shane Warne were fined for revealing information about the 'weather' to a bookmaker.

The fourth Test of Pakistan's summer 2010 cricket tour of England contained several incidents of spot fixing, involving members of Pakistan team deliberately bowling no-balls at specific points to facilitate betting through bookmakers. Following investigation, three Pakistani players were banned from cricket and sentenced to prison terms. Similarly, in Indian Premier League in 2013, S. Sreesanth and two other players were banned by the Board of Control for Cricket in India for alleged match fixing. Sreesanth's ban was briefly lifted, but the Kerala High Court upheld the ban in 2017.

In July 2017, ex-Sri Lanka cricket captain Arjuna Ranatunga alleged that the 2011 Cricket World Cup Final match between India and Sri Lanka had been fixed. The investigation was dropped by Sri Lankan authorities and the International Cricket Council in 2020 due to a lack of evidence.

In July 2022, it was reported that local authorities had shut down an operation in Gujarat, India, that had been running a fictitious, kayfabe version of the Indian Premier League in an attempt to scam Russian sports betters. The matches took place on a field with floodlights, with players dressed in replica jerseys of real IPL teams; based on bets received on a Telegram channel, umpires instructed the players and "referees" to perform specific plays and calls. Broadcasts of the "matches" were streamed on YouTube, and utilized artificial crowd noise, a sound-alike of cricket commentator Harsha Bhogle, and camera angles that never showed clear shots of the pitch, players, or deliveries. The participating players were paid 400 rupees per-game, and the operation was estimated to have scammed punters out of 300,000 rupees before it was shut down by police. The actual 2022 Indian Premier League had already concluded at the end of May.

=== Association football ===
The issue of match fixing in association football has been described in 2013 by Chris Eaton, the former Head of Security of FIFA (the sport's world governing body), as a "crisis", while UEFA's president Michel Platini has said that if it continues, "football is dead". Zhang Jilong, president of the Asian Football Confederation, has stated that it is a "pandemic". The issue also affects a number of other sports across the world. In May 2011, world governing body FIFA announced an anti-match fixing plan, and in September 2012 FIFA President Sepp Blatter warned that match-fixing endangered "the integrity of the game". In September 2014, the Council of Europe also announced they would tackle the problem.

A number of clubs in countries across the world have been subject to match fixing, including Australia, China, and Spain. The South African national team has also been investigated. In the 18 months prior to February 2013, Europol investigated 680 matches in 30 countries. In November 2013, 11 men were charged in Estonia with fixing 17 matches. The problem is often attributed to criminal gangs based in Asia, who generate "hundreds of billions of euros per year". Players who have publicly rejected bribes have been praised, such as in a case in Belize. Sportradar Integrity Services identified 721 suspicious soccer matches in 72 countries in 2024 and 881 matches in 83 countries in 2023. Suspicious activity mostly occurred in live betting and primarily involved suspected manipulations of the winning goal margin or total goals in a march.

=== Professional wrestling ===
In professional wrestling, most matches have predetermined results; however, as it is an open secret that professional wrestling is staged, it is not considered match fixing. Up until the 1920s, professional wrestling was considered a legitimate sport. This did not endure as professional wrestling became identified with modern theatrics or admitted fakery, moving away from actual competition. The "worked", known as "kayfabe" nature of wrestling led critics to deem it an illegitimate sport, particularly in comparison to boxing, amateur wrestling, and, more recently, mixed martial arts.

Many individuals began to doubt the legitimacy of wrestling after the retirement of Frank Gotch in 1913. As wrestling's popularity was diving around the same time that Major League Baseball had its own legitimacy issues, wrestling started to take on a more worked approach while still appearing as a legitimate sport, beginning with the Gold Dust Trio of the 1920s. Even after the formation of the National Wrestling Alliance in 1948, wrestling continued to have legitimacy issues.

Nevertheless, wrestling was still regulated by state athletic commissions in the United States well into the 1980s, until Vince McMahon, owner of the World Wrestling Federation, convinced the state of New Jersey in 1989 that wrestling was considered a form of entertainment (or "sports entertainment", as McMahon used) rather than as a legitimate sport, and that it should not be regulated by state athletic commissions. The move was seen as more of a relief to those who had questioned wrestling's legitimacy, since at least one major company (in this case, the WWF) was now publicly willing to admit that wrestling was staged; however, the move did anger many wrestling purists.

Due to the lingering legitimacy issues that surrounded wrestling from the 1910s until the 1980s, gambling was generally not allowed on wrestling matches while it was still considered a legitimate sport. Despite wrestling having openly acknowledged that the results are predetermined for years, since the late 2000s gambling has increased on wrestling events, though the maximum bets are kept low due to the matches being predetermined. By contrast, when the WWF co-founded an American football league with NBC known as the XFL (which played for a single season in 2001), the league had to emphasize that its games were not staged in this manner (despite drawing upon wrestling, and in particular the WWF's "Attitude Era", in its overall image and presentation), and specifically promoted the willingness of Las Vegas bookmakers to take wagers on the games as evidence of its legitimacy.

=== Quiz shows ===
In the 1950s, the producers of several televised quiz shows in the United States were found to have engaged in match fixing, as part of an effort to boost viewer interest and ratings. Geritol, the sponsor of the new quiz show Twenty-One, showed concerns over the poor performance of its early contestants—which they felt were causing the show to trail behind its main competitor, The $64,000 Question. At the time, the majority of television programs were effectively controlled by their single sponsors, with broadcasters only providing studios and airtime. Geritol demanded that Barry & Enright Productions make changes to the show, which included the outright choreography of contestants around predetermined outcomes.

The most infamous example of this strategy came when champion Herbert Stempel was to be replaced by Charles Van Doren—a Columbia University English teacher who the producers felt would be more popular with viewers. On Twenty-One, winners of matches received $500 for every point of their margin of victory, but this pot increased by $500 after every tie game. To build anticipation for the episode where Van Doren would defeat Stempel, the first episode of their match was played to three tie games; this meant that the next game would be played for $2,000 per point. After one more tie game, Stempel threw the match to Van Doren by answering specific questions incorrectly. Among them, he incorrectly guessed that On the Waterfront was the winner of the Best Picture award at the 28th Academy Awards. The correct answer was Marty, which was also one of Stempel's favorite films.

The cancellation of the competing quiz Dotto under similar allegations prompted a U.S. government investigation into both it and Twenty-One. The investigation similarly revealed that Revlon—the sponsor of The $64,000 Question—had instructed the show's producers to balance its questions more favorably towards contestants they felt would be more popular among viewers (although it stopped short of outright rigging games to the same extent as Twenty-One). The scandal prompted the passage of a federal law prohibiting broadcasters from carrying fixed contests resembling any game of chance or intellectual skill. Notably, one quiz show, Our Little Genius, was cancelled before its premiere after accusations that the outcome was being scripted.

=== Esports ===
Match fixing controversies have also emerged in Esports, including in particular Counter-Strike: Global Offensive, Dota 2, League of Legends, Overwatch, Paladins, and StarCraft. Major scandals have included those of the iBuyPower and NetcodeGuides.com Counter-Strike teams, where it was found that the iBuyPower team had received around $10,000 worth of items via skin gambling—the practice of wagering CS:GO weapon skins in a similar manner to sports betting, based on real-world market values on Steam's Community Market—after they threw matches in a major tournament. South Korean StarCraft II player Life was also convicted of having partaken in match fixing.

Dota 2 matchfixing is most prominent in Chinese and SEA regions. Rustam "Adekvat" Mavliutov attributes this to a more complex structure with enough players of different skill:

Why does it happen more often in Asia? In my opinion—where there is more structuring in the environment, where the whole cyber sports part is better structured, specific tier-divisions are identified, a huge number of tournaments and leagues are built on this structure, then the appearance of 322-matches is most possible. This structure implies the participation of bookmakers, the presence of large prize money, investors and so on. Where there is money, there will be matchfixing. Roughly speaking, if we know for sure that in China there is the first, second league and the third division, about which less is known, but some teams also play there, we understand that there will naturally be rigged matches there. We have less of this, because we have fewer leagues. We don't have a clear structure of tiers. We won't be able to put together a league with twelve tier-2 teams. You can do that in China. More teams, bigger organisations, the percentage of rigged matches is also higher, that's a fact.

=== Protection against manipulation ===
By monitoring the pre-match betting markets it is sometimes possible to detect planned match fixing. It is also possible to detect on-going match manipulation by looking at the in-game betting markets. Several federations have employed services that provide such systems for detecting match manipulation. Prior to the 2016 MLB season, Major League Baseball (MLB) hired Genius Sports, a sports technology company specialising in integrity, to monitor the betting patterns on all of their games. In addition, Interpol monitors and publishes major developments in match-fixing and corruption in sports around the world. In addition, several federations run integrity tours where players and officials participate in educational workshops on how match fixing work and how they are prevented.

== See also ==
- Bookmaker
- Convention on the Manipulation of Sports Competitions
- List of match fixing incidents
- Match fixing in association football
- Match fixing in cricket
  - List of cricketers banned for match fixing
- Organized crime
- Over–under (both teams combined score betting)
- Point shaving (attempts to manipulate a match score based on the point spread)
- Sports betting
- Spot-fixing (attempts to manipulate certain portions of a match)
- Team orders
