= Martin Olive =

English cricketer

Personal information
- Full name: Martin Olive
- Born: 18 April 1958 (age 68); Watford, Hertfordshire, England
- Batting: Right-handed
- Role: Batsman

Domestic team information
- Years: Team
- 1977–1981: Somerset
- 1982–1987: Devon
- First-class debut: 15 June 1977 Somerset v Glamorgan
- Last First-class: 3 July 1981 Somerset v Surrey
- List A debut: 5 June 1977 Somerset v Glamorgan
- Last List A: 24 June 1987 Devon v Worcestershire

Career statistics
| Competition | First-class | List A |
|---|---|---|
| Matches | 17 | 2 |
| Runs scored | 467 | 11 |
| Batting average | 15.56 | 11.00 |
| 100s/50s | –/1 | –/– |
| Top score | 50 | 9 |
| Balls bowled | – | – |
| Wickets | – | – |
| Bowling average | – | – |
| 5 wickets in innings | – | – |
| 10 wickets in match | – | – |
| Best bowling | – | – |
| Catches/stumpings | 9/– | –/– |
- Source: CricketArchive, 24 February 2011

Martin Olive (born 18 April 1958) was an English cricketer who played first-class and List A cricket for Somerset from 1977 to 1981. He also played Minor Counties and List A cricket for Devon. He was born at Watford, Hertfordshire.

== Career ==
Olive was a right-handed middle-order or opening batsman. He was a successful school cricketer at Millfield School and was playing for Somerset's second eleven at the age of 17. In 1977, he made a single List A appearance and then his first-class debut, playing in a handful of games, and then appeared in the England Under-19 team in one-day international matches. The strength of Somerset's squad restricted Olive's first-team opportunities to a single game in each of the 1978 and 1979 seasons; he did not play any further one-day matches for Somerset. But in 1980, he played in nine first-class games, and in the match against Yorkshire at Weston-super-Mare he made exactly 50, the only first-class half-century of his career. Wisden Cricketers' Almanack, in its report on Somerset in the 1981 edition, said that Olive "did enough to suggest a future as a sound opening batsman".

In 1981, however, Olive was unsuccessful in the three first-class matches in which he appeared, and Jeremy Lloyds became the regular opening batsman for the team. Olive left the Somerset staff at the end of the season and took a job in a building society in Devon: the building society was the target of a holdup on his first day. In 1982, 1986 and 1987, he played Minor Counties cricket for Devon and in 1987 he made a single List A appearance in the NatWest Trophy, opening the batting for Devon in a heavy defeat against Worcestershire.

As of 2011, he was head of key accounts at Sun Life Financial of Canada, based in Bristol.
