= Graham Burgess (cricketer) =

English cricketer

Personal information
- Full name: Graham Iefvion Burgess
- Born: 5 May 1943 (age 83); Glastonbury, Somerset, England
- Nickname: Budgie
- Batting: Right-handed
- Bowling: Right-arm medium
- Role: Bowling all-rounder

Domestic team information
- Years: Team
- 1966–1980: Somerset
- First-class debut: 16 July 1966 Somerset v West Indians
- Last First-class: 9 June 1979 Somerset v Oxford University
- List A debut: 10 August 1966 Somerset v Warwickshire
- Last List A: 22 May 1982 Minor Counties v Worcestershire

Umpiring information
- WODIs umpired: 2 (2006)

Career statistics
Competition	First-class	List A
Matches	252	210
Runs scored	7129	3138
Batting average	18.90	19.73
100s/50s	2/32	0/12
Top score	129	73
Balls bowled	28934	9831
Wickets	474	251
Bowling average	28.57	25.04
5 wickets in innings	18	2
10 wickets in match	2	n/a
Best bowling	7/43	6/25
Catches/stumpings	120/–	53/–
- Source: CricketArchive, 30 January 2010

Graham Iefvion Burgess (born 5 May 1943) is a former first-class cricketer who made over 450 appearances for Somerset County Cricket Club between 1966 and 1980. A right-arm medium pace bowler and a right-handed lower middle-order hitter, Burgess is described by Cricinfo as "a good old-fashioned county professional". After his retirement from professional cricket, Burgess qualified as a first-class umpire, and stood in over 500 county cricket matches between 1990 and 2008, when he retired. He also umpired a number of international matches, including Youth Test matches, Youth One Day Internationals and Women's One Day Internationals.

== Early career ==
An education at Millfield School helped to steer all-round sportsman Burgess to a career in cricket. Although the Somerset side at the time was not known for signing local talent, earning it a tag of 'a team of all nations', Burgess became an exception. He appeared for Somerset Second XI regularly between 1963 and 1966, impressing with both bat and ball. He made his debut for the first-team in a match against the touring West Indians in July 1966, and the step-up proved tough. Burgess recorded scores of 1 and 35 with the bat as Somerset followed-on, and opening the bowling, he finished with figures of 0/101. Despite his unimpressive entrance into first-class cricket, Burgess was selected for the County Championship match against Lancashire the day after the conclusion of the West Indians match. Not asked to bowl by his captain, Burgess was free to concentrate solely on his batting, and put on a 145 run partnership for the sixth wicket with Ken Palmer to help Somerset to recover from 29/5. Burgess claimed his first wicket in county cricket during a Gillette Cup match against Warwickshire in early August, a match that was also his List A debut. Burgess finished his first season with 406 runs from 21 innings at an average of 20.30 in first-class cricket.

== Later career ==
Burgess continued to play for Somerset in first-class cricket until 1979 and in limited-over cricket until 1982. The closing stages of his career coincided with increasing success for the county as he played alongside Viv Richards, Ian Botham, Joel Garner, Brian Rose and Vic Marks as the club achieved its first major honours. He was part of the team in 1979 which won, on successive days, the Gillette Cup, and the John Player League. Burgess contributed in Somerset's run to the former, top-scoring with 50 not out in the quarter-final against Kent, and taking 3 for 25 in the semi-final against Middlesex.
