= David Gurr (cricketer) =

English cricketer (born 1956)

Personal information
- Full name: David Roberts Gurr
- Born: 27 March 1956 (age 70); Whitchurch, Buckinghamshire, England
- Height: 6 ft 3.5 in (1.92 m)
- Batting: Right-handed
- Bowling: Right-arm fast-medium
- Role: Bowler

Domestic team information
- Years: Team
- 1976–1977: Oxford University
- 1976–1979: Somerset
- FC debut: 21 April 1976 Oxford Univ. v Gloucestershire
- Last FC: 30 July 1979 Somerset v Indians
- LA debut: 1 May 1976 Combined Universities v Kent
- Last LA: 22 April 1978 Somerset v Glamorgan

Career statistics
Competition	First-class	List A
Matches	41	19
Runs scored	410	72
Batting average	16.40	10.28
100s/50s	0/0	0/0
Top score	46*	29*
Balls bowled	6,127	943
Wickets	110	14
Bowling average	27.99	35.85
5 wickets in innings	5	0
10 wickets in match	0	0
Best bowling	6/82	3/42
Catches/stumpings	9/–	1/–
- Source: CricketArchive, 31 May 2010

David Roberts Gurr (born 27 March 1956) is an English cricketer. He played first-class cricket for Oxford University and Somerset between 1976 and 1979. He was born at Whitchurch, Buckinghamshire.

== Cricket career ==
Gurr was a right-handed lower-order batsman and a right-arm fast-medium bowler. Educated at Aylesbury Grammar School, he played cricket for Middlesex's second eleven before going to Oxford University, where he studied one year of theology and one year of geography at Regent's Park College, one of the permanent private halls within the university. Gurr made his first-class cricket debut for Oxford University in 1976 and in his second match for the university took five wickets for 73 runs in Middlesex's first innings with bowling of what Wisden termed "lively pace". He followed that with six for 82 against Warwickshire without the aid of fielders – five bowled, one lbw, and these were to be the best figures of his career. With eight wickets in the University match, in which he won his blue, he was one of the architects of Oxford's first success for 10 years. When the university cricket season was over, he joined Somerset and had further success, taking five Lancashire wickets in the first innings (and nine in the match) at Weston-super-Mare.

Gurr began the 1977 season with five Warwickshire wickets for 42 runs in the first Oxford match. But the university cricket season was badly affected by wet weather and Gurr also went through what Wisden termed a "bad patch" in which his bowling lacked control. But he won a second blue in the university match and made his highest first-class score, an undefeated 46, in the first innings of the game, enabling Oxford to recover from a middle-order collapse. At the end of the university cricket season, Gurr was elected secretary – one of two honorary posts within the Oxford cricket club, the other being captain – for the 1978 season, but he then failed his prelims examinations and had to leave the university. He rejoined Somerset for the second half of the 1977 season and had one successful match, taking five Warwickshire wickets for 60 runs at Edgbaston. But competition for places in the Somerset side was more intense in 1977 following the recruitment of the West Indian fast bowler Joel Garner, and Gurr also started to have problems with his bowling action, which resulted in a large number of wides.

In 1978 and 1979, Gurr was on the Somerset staff, though he made limited appearances in both first-class and List A cricket. In 1978, Wisden reported, "Gurr's great potential was, unhappily, not available until the end [of the season], when he had manfully overcome a shattering loss of confidence". A year later, the Wisden report was little changed: "The recurring inability of Gurr to fill his ordained position as opening fast bowler continued to worry everyone," its report said. At the end of the season, Gurr got married and took a job with an insurance company. In his entry in the first-ever Cricketers' Who's Who book in 1980, Gurr wrote: "I will probably spend the 1980 season playing part-time, acting as stand-by. I hope to develop my career in the life assurance market while trying to keep in touch with the first-class game. If all goes well, I hope to try and spend more time in cricket in two or three seasons' time." In fact, he played in one second eleven match for Somerset in 1980, but never again appeared in first-class or List A cricket.
