= Phil Slocombe =

English cricketer

Personal information
- Full name: Philip Anthony Slocombe
- Born: 6 September 1954 (age 72); Weston-super-Mare, England
- Batting: Right-handed
- Bowling: Right-arm medium
- Role: Batsman

Domestic team information
- Years: Team
- 1975–1983: Somerset
- FC debut: 30 April 1975 Somerset v Sussex
- Last FC: 24 August 1983 Somerset v Hampshire
- LA debut: 17 May 1975 Somerset v Hampshire
- Last LA: 11 September 1983 Somerset v Warwickshire

Career statistics
Competition	First-class	List A
Matches	139	78
Runs scored	5,634	829
Batting average	27.61	14.80
100s/50s	7/30	0/0
Top score	132	46
Balls bowled	92	–
Wickets	3	–
Bowling average	18.00	–
5 wickets in innings	0	–
10 wickets in match	0	–
Best bowling	1/2	–
Catches/stumpings	65/–	19/–
- Source: Cricinfo, 27 August 2009

Philip Anthony Slocombe (born 6 September 1954) is a retired English cricketer who played for Somerset throughout his career. He was a right-handed opening batsman and right-arm medium pace bowler. He was part of the NatWest Trophy winning team of 1983.

== Career ==
Born 6 September 1954 in Weston-super-Mare, Somerset, Slocombe was educated at Millfield School, Slocombe was part of the Somerset Second XI team at the age of 14. He made his first-class debut against Sussex in May 1975, scoring 61 not out batting at number seven. In only his third County Championship match for Somerset, he made his maiden century while playing against Gloucestershire. A further century while opening the second innings against Nottinghamshire helped him become Somerset's first batsman to score 1,000 runs in his first full season.

Slocombe's strong performances in his debut season saw him included in DH Robins' XI tour of South Africa in 1976 that included Fred Titmus and was captained by David Lloyd. He played twice, against Western Province and Eastern Province, but only scored 27 runs. He was also part of the Marylebone Cricket Club team that was devastated by the bowling of Paddy Clift during the 1976 season opener against County Champions Leicestershire.

By the third game of the 1976 County Championship season, Slocombe was opening the batting with Brian Rose. He continued to open the batting for the majority of his career, forging a lasting partnership with Rose. He found it difficult to replicate his success of the 1975 season, only achieving 1,000 runs in a season once more in 1978.

== Later life ==
Since retiring from cricket, Slocombe worked as an antiques dealer in Texas, and later as patron of a country house hotel in Brittany. He is married to Susan. Since 1995 he has been CEO of his own company, The Rare and Fine Wine Company, based in London.
