= John Whitehouse (cricketer) =

English cricketer (born 1949)

Personal information
- Full name: John Whitehouse
- Born: 8 April 1949 (age 77); Nuneaton, Warwickshire, England
- Batting: Right-handed
- Bowling: Right-arm off-break
- Role: Batsman

Domestic team information
- Years: Team
- 1971–1980: Warwickshire
- First-class debut: 19 May 1971 Warwickshire v Oxford University
- Last First-class: 5 September 1980 Warwickshire v Somerset
- List A debut: 27 June 1971 Warwickshire v Hampshire
- Last List A: 7 September 1980 Warwickshire v Somerset

Career statistics
Competition	First-class	List A
Matches	180	144
Runs scored	8,693	3,106
Batting average	32.07	24.65
100s/50s	15/35	1/13
Top score	197	109
Balls bowled	781	36
Wickets	6	1
Bowling average	78.50	36.00
5 wickets in innings	0	0
10 wickets in match	–	0
Best bowling	2/55	1/36
Catches/stumpings	120/–	42/–
- Source: CricketArchive, 9 June 2015

John Whitehouse (born 8 April 1949) is an English cricketer who played first-class and List A cricket for Warwickshire between 1971 and 1980 and captained the team in 1978 and 1979. He was born in Nuneaton, Warwickshire.

Whitehouse was educated at King Edward VI Grammar School, Nuneaton and at Bristol University and had completed his studies before turning his full-time attention to cricket, though he had played second eleven cricket for Warwickshire from 1969. His first-class cricket debut in May 1971 was a minor cricket sensation: opening the batting against the admittedly weak bowling of Oxford University, he scored 173 out of a Warwickshire total of 324, with 38 not out in the second innings. At the time it was the fourth highest score ever by an English player making his debut. Warwickshire's strong batting line-up was rejigged to accommodate him, initially as a middle-order batsman, later as the opening partner to England Test batsman John Jameson, though it was with Billy Ibadulla that he put on 223 for the first wicket against Nottinghamshire, making 122, his second century, in August 1971. He finished the season with 1295 runs at an average of 38.08. He was also named Cricket Writers' Club Young Cricketer of the Year for the 1971 season.

Following this impressive start, Whitehouse's first-class cricket career stalled. In both 1972 and 1973, he failed to pass 1,000 runs for the season and he also failed to add to his tally of centuries; in the second of these seasons, however, he was awarded his county cap. He took the whole of the 1974 season off from cricket to prepare for his professional accountancy examinations.

Warwickshire made Whitehouse wait before recalling him to the first team in June 1975, but when they did he produced much better form, with two centuries in three matches. He fell just short of 1,000 runs in that season, but his average rose to 33.44 and he had developed into a fine slip fielder, taking 24 catches in just 16 first-class games. The next two years were Whitehouse's best in first-class cricket. In 1976, he scored 1363 runs with an average of 35.86 and two centuries; in 1977 he raised that to 1543 runs at 42.86 and six centuries. He did not exceed his debut score of 173 in these seasons, though he had reached an unbeaten 169 in the 1976 match against Yorkshire and shared in a fourth-wicket partnership of 266 with Rohan Kanhai which remains a record for games between these sides, when the innings was ended under the rule of the time which restricted first innings to 100 overs. He was also successful in 1976 in limited overs cricket and scored his only List A match century in the Gillette Cup match against Glamorgan, an innings of 109.

At the end of the 1977 season, the Warwickshire captain, David Brown, retired from full-time cricket and Whitehouse was picked to replace him. It was a difficult time for Warwickshire as several established players had retired and others, including the England Test player Dennis Amiss, were involved in the World Series Cricket breakaway group, and feelings within Warwickshire particularly ran high about their continued involvement in domestic cricket. Whitehouse won praise for steering the cricket team through these difficulties, but his own form suffered and in neither 1978 nor 1979, the years of his captaincy, did he maintain his batting form: he failed to score 1000 runs in both seasons, and his average was barely above 20. He resigned from the captaincy after the 1979 season and returned to his best form in the 10 matches he played in 1980; these included the County Championship match against Glamorgan in which he finally beat his debut score of 1971 by making a second innings 197 to save the match. At the end of the 1980 season he retired from first-class and List A cricket.

After retiring from playing, Whitehouse had a successful business career, and later returned to Warwickshire as honorary treasurer; but he resigned in 2000, saying he was disillusioned with cricket.
