= Jeremy Lloyds =

English cricketer and umpire (1954–2022)

Personal information
- Full name: Jeremy William Lloyds
- Born: 17 November 1954; Penang, Malaya
- Died: 21 November 2022 (aged 68)
- Batting: Left-handed
- Bowling: Right-arm off break
- Role: All-rounder (1979–1991); Umpire (1996–2020)

Domestic team information
- Years: Team
- 1979–1984: Somerset
- 1983/84–1987/88: Orange Free State
- 1985–1991: Gloucestershire

Umpiring information
- Tests umpired: 5 (2004–2005)
- ODIs umpired: 18 (2000–2006)
- T20Is umpired: 1 (2005)
- WTests umpired: 1 (2006)
- WODIs umpired: 3 (2007–2018)
- WT20Is umpired: 3 (2011–2014)

Career statistics
Competition	First-class	List A
Matches	267	177
Runs scored	10,679	1,982
Batting average	31.04	15.98
100s/50s	10/62	0/5
Top score	132*	73*
Balls bowled	24,175	1,522
Wickets	333	26
Bowling average	38.86	43.42
5 wickets in innings	13	0
10 wickets in match	1	0
Best bowling	7/88	3/14
Catches/stumpings	229/–	58/–
- Source: ESPNcricinfo, 24 November 2022

Jeremy William Lloyds (17 November 1954 – 21 November 2022) was an English cricket player and umpire. A left-handed batsman and right-arm off break bowler, he played for Somerset, Orange Free State and Gloucestershire before his retirement in 1991. Lloyds made his umpiring debut in 1996 and graduated to county cricket in 1998 and international games in 2000.

== Early life ==
Born on 17 November 1954 in Penang, Malaya, Lloyds was educated at Curry Rivel Primary School and then Blundell's School, where he played cricket with future England international Vic Marks. While playing county cricket in Somerset in the late 1970s, Lloyds played rugby union for Taunton R.F.C. and was captain for the 1977–78 season.

== Playing career ==
Lloyds was on the groundstaff (MCC Young Cricketer) at Lord's Cricket Ground before joining Somerset County Cricket Club. He broke into the county's Second XI in summer 1973 but looked set to miss out on a first XI contract. In 1979 he was set to carry out some coaching with Don Wilson in the Netherlands but impressed with a score of 80 in a benefit match for Hallam Moseley and was offered a contract. Lloyds made his debut for the Somerset first XI in June 1979 against Cambridge University.

Lloyds later played for Gloucestershire County Cricket Club and Orange Free State. A left-handed batsman and a right-arm offbreak bowler, Lloyds played 267 first-class matches scoring 10679 runs at an average of 31.04 with 10 hundreds and 62 fifties. His top score was 132 not out. He also took 229 catches. With the ball in first-class cricket he took 333 wickets at an average of 38.86 with 13 five-wicket hauls and one ten-wicket haul. His best bowling in first-class cricket was 7/88.

== Umpiring career ==
Lloyds made his first-class umpiring debut in 1996 and graduated to county cricket in 1998. He progressed to international level in 2000, when he umpired his first one-day international match. In his first ball as an umpire at Test level he gave out a Bangladeshi batsman leg before wicket. Lloyds was a member of the International Cricket Council International Panel of Umpires and Referees between 2004 and 2006 when he stepped down from international cricket due to family reasons.

As of the end of the 2008 English cricket season, Lloyds had umpired 143 first-class matches.

In September 2020, Lloyds stood in his final match, in the fixture between Gloucestershire and Northamptonshire in the 2020 Bob Willis Trophy. The game ended in unusual circumstances when it was called off after lunch on day 1, due to a COVID-19-related issue. During his career, Lloyds umpired five Test matches, 18 one day internationals and a single Twenty20 International match, England v Australia in 2005.

Lloyds died on 21 November 2022, at 68.

== See also ==
- List of Test cricket umpires
- List of One Day International cricket umpires
- List of Twenty20 International cricket umpires
