= Trevor Gard =

English cricketer

Personal information
- Born: 2 June 1957 (age 69); West Lambrook, Somerset, England
- Height: 5 ft 5 in (1.65 m)
- Batting: Right-handed
- Role: Wicket-keeper

Domestic team information
- Years: Team
- 1976–1989: Somerset
- First-class debut: 26 May 1976 Somerset v West Indians
- Last First-class: 21 June 1989 Somerset v Gloucestershire
- List A debut: 22 August 1982 Somerset v Leicestershire
- Last List A: 18 June 1989 Somerset v Kent

Career statistics
Competition	FC	LA
Matches	112	81
Runs scored	1389	240
Batting average	13.75	12.00
100s/50s	0/3	0/0
Top score	51*	34
Balls bowled	2	0
Wickets	0	–
Bowling average	–	–
5 wickets in innings	0	–
10 wickets in match	0	–
Best bowling	0/8	–
Catches/stumpings	178/39	57/13
- Source: , 13 February 2010

Trevor Gard (born 2 June 1957) is a former English first-class cricketer who made more than 100 appearances for Somerset between 1976 and 1989.

A right-handed lower-order batsman and wicket-keeper, standing five feet five inches tall, Gard was Somerset's regular wicket-keeper from 1983 to 1986. In the quarter-final of the 1983 NatWest Trophy, he was named the player of the match for his five catches. In the final later that season he made two brilliant leg-side stumpings to help Somerset to the title.

Despite his wicket-keeping ability, Gard was replaced in the Somerset team by Neil Burns, who was regarded as a better batsman. Gard bowled two balls in his career: in a County Championship match against Sussex in 1983, when Sussex faced a victory target of only seven runs, he conceded two fours to grant Sussex a 10 wicket victory.
