= Colin Dredge =

English cricketer

Personal information
- Full name: Colin Herbert Dredge
- Born: 4 August 1954 (age 72); Frome, Somerset, England
- Batting: Left-handed
- Bowling: Right-arm medium

Career statistics
| Competition | First-class | List A |
|---|---|---|
| Matches | 194 | 209 |
| Runs scored | 2,182 | 464 |
| Batting average | 13.98 | 10.54 |
| 100s/50s | 0/4 | 0/0 |
| Top score | 56* | 28* |
| Balls bowled | 28,414 | 9,594 |
| Wickets | 443 | 253 |
| Bowling average | 30.10 | 25.42 |
| 5 wickets in innings | 12 | 1 |
| 10 wickets in match | 0 | 0 |
| Best bowling | 6/37 | 5/35 |
| Catches/stumpings | 84/– | 66/– |
- Source: CricInfo, 11 May 2020

Colin Herbert Dredge (born 4 August 1954) is an English former first-class cricketer who played for Somerset County Cricket Club. He was known as the "Demon of Frome", a nickname coined by journalist, Alan Gibson.

Colin Dredge made his debut for Somerset on 16 June 1976 against Worcester and was awarded his Somerset Cap in 1978. He made useful contributions as a regular for the County side until 1986. He played 194 first-class matches and 209 one-day matches, including 4 one-day finals, winning the Benson & Hedges Cup in 1981 and 1982 and the Nat West Trophy in 1983. Dredge was not selected for the final of the Gillette Cup in 1979, but played the following day in the crucial win over Nottinghamshire which clinched the John Player League . For much of his career he was overshadowed by Test bowlers Joel Garner, Ian Botham and Vic Marks, but he did win one man-of -the-match award by taking 4-23 against Kent in the 1978 Gillette Cup quarter-final. In 3-day matches he took over 50 wickets in a season 4 times, including 63 in 1980 when he took 5 wickets in an innings on 5 occasions. Batting as a tailender, he made 4 scores over 50 and he took 84 catches.

Dredge was involved in the extremely close finish to the John Player League in 1976 when he was run out on the final delivery of the last match of the season, going for the run that would have won Somerset a first major trophy.

Dredge had seven brothers, all of whom played for Frome. He still lives in the town, working in Westbury for Network Rail.
