= Alan Gibson =

English journalist, writer and radio broadcaster

- Gibson in the 1970s
- Born: Norman Alan Stewart Gibson; 28 May 1923; Sheffield, Yorkshire, England
- Died: 10 April 1997 (aged 73); Taunton, Somerset, England
- Education: Taunton School; The Queen's College, Oxford
- Occupations: Journalist, writer, radio broadcaster
- Spouses: Olwen Thomas (m. 1948, divorced) Rosemary King (m. 1968, divorced)
- Children: 4

Norman Alan Stewart Gibson (28 May 1923 – 10 April 1997) was an English journalist, writer and radio broadcaster, best known for his work in connection with cricket, though he also sometimes covered football and rugby union. At various times Alan Gibson was also a university lecturer, poet, BBC radio producer, historian, Baptist lay preacher and Liberal Party parliamentary candidate.

== Life and career ==
Alan Gibson was born at Sheffield in Yorkshire, but the family moved to Leyton, on the north-eastern outskirts of London, when he was seven, and subsequently to the West Country, where he attended Taunton School. Apart from his time at university, he spent all his subsequent life in that region, most of his cricket reporting being of Somerset and Gloucestershire matches. After school he went to Queen's College, Oxford, where he gained a First in history and was elected President of the Oxford Union, though he never took office because of being called for National Service.

Gibson was a member of the Liberal Party and served as President of the Falmouth and Camborne Liberal Association. He stood as parliamentary candidate for that constituency at the 1959 General election but came third.

He was briefly a travelling lecturer with University College, Exeter, before getting a job with the West Region of the BBC Radio Home Service. That led him into cricket (and other sporting) commentary on matches in the region, though he did not do much of this until leaving the BBC staff and becoming a freelance. Eventually he graduated to national broadcasts, including appearances on Test Match Special from 1962 to 1975. He was a presenter of the BBC West regional TV news magazine programme Westward Ho! during 1953. Between 1955 and 1966, with his fellow compere Derek Jones, he presented a Saturday morning radio programme for the West Region called Good Morning!, interspersing popular music with unscripted chat between the presenters. He was the narrator for the short documentary film Falmouth for Orders in 1965 and for three episodes of the BBC TV natural history series The World About Us between 1968 and 1973.

He wrote on cricket at various times for The Sunday Telegraph, The Guardian, The Spectator and The Cricketer. From 1967 until 1986 he was a cricket reporter for The Times. He also reported rugby union, in print and on radio. He appeared on the radio shows Sunday Half Hour and Round Britain Quiz. In 1961 he briefly joined the recently launched Westward Television to present Westward Diary after "he had been involved in a disagreement with the West Region authorities of the BBC over a comment he is alleged to have made in a two-way records programme with Derek Jones".

As a cricket commentator he was articulate and often drily humorous. On a Saturday afternoon sport programme, Neil Durden-Smith once mentioned that he had been having tea with the Bishop of Leicester. On being cued in, Gibson began his commentary stint with: "No episcopal visitations here." His cricket writing for The Times was generally light-hearted, often concentrating more on his journey to the match (invariably by train, often changing at Didcot, rarely straightforward) than on the cricket itself.

In his pieces he coined the descriptions "the Sage of Longparish" for his colleague John Woodcock, "the Demon of Frome" for Colin Dredge of Somerset, the Old Bald Blighter (the OBB) for Brian Close and "the Shoreditch Sparrow" for Robin Jackman. Woodcock said concerning their reports for The Times: "I write about the cricket, and Alan writes about 'A Day at the Cricket'."

In 1975 he was chosen to give the address at the memorial service for Sir Neville Cardus, held at St Paul's, Covent Garden. This was printed in the following year's edition of Wisden Cricketer's Almanack. He was elected the first President of the Cricket Writers' Club in 1982.

Not a robust man, he had spells of depression, once spending some time in a psychiatric hospital. He also had a drink problem (which was the reason he was dropped from Test Match Special). His reports for The Times often referred to his regular appearances at 'The Star' public house in High Littleton, where he lived, and reports of matches involving Gloucestershire invariably mentioned the GRIP – the Gloriously Red-headed Imperturbable Pamela, the barmaid in the main pavilion bar at the County Ground at Bristol.

He married twice: to Olwen Thomas in 1948 and to Rosemary King in 1968. Both marriages produced two children and both ended in divorce. He died at Taunton in Somerset.

== Select bibliography ==
- Jackson's Year: The Test Matches of 1905, Sportsman Book Club, 1966.
- A Mingled Yarn, Collins, 1976. ISBN 0-00-216115-X (Autobiography)
- Growing Up With Cricket - Some Memories of a Sporting Education, George Allen & Unwin, 1985. ISBN 0-04-796099-X
- The Cricket Captains of England, The Pavilion Library, 1989. ISBN 1-85145-390-3 (A revised edition, the original being published in 1979.)
- West Country Treasury: A Compendium of Lore and Literature, People and Places, Ex Libris Press, 1989, ISBN 0-948578-19-X (Co-authored with his son, Anthony Gibson)
- Of Didcot and the Demon: The Cricketing Times of Alan Gibson, Fairfield Books, 2009, ISBN 978-0-9560702-5-8 (Compiled by his son, Anthony Gibson)
