= Jim Griffiths (cricketer) =

English cricketer

Personal information
- Full name: Brian James Griffiths
- Born: 13 June 1949 (age 77); Wellingborough, Northamptonshire, England
- Batting: Right-handed
- Bowling: Right arm medium
- Role: Bowler

Domestic team information
- Years: Team
- 1974–1986: Northamptonshire

Career statistics
Competition	First-class	List A
Matches	177	165
Runs scored	290	78
Batting average	3.33	3.71
100s/50s	0/0	0/0
Top score	16	11*
Balls bowled	n/a	7,626
Wickets	444	183
Bowling average	29.05	27.09
5 wickets in innings	13	4
10 wickets in match	0	2
Best bowling	8/50	5/33
Catches/stumpings	36/–	15/–
- Source: Cricinfo, 7 June 2013

Brian James Griffiths (born 13 June 1949 in Wellingborough, Northamptonshire) is a former English first-class cricketer who played for Northamptonshire. He was a medium pace seam bowler, who took over 400 first-class wickets spanning a twelve-year period between 1974 and 1986. Griffiths later played for Lincolnshire and continued playing league cricket into his fifties.

He is however best remembered not for his bowling but for his inept batting, managing a career average of just over 3 runs per innings, which is the second-lowest by any regular first-class cricketer ahead of Francis McHugh of Yorkshire and Gloucestershire. Griffiths was out 51 times in his career without scoring and early in his career played ten consecutive innings without scoring a run, breaking the long-time record of Tom Goddard, Seymour Clark and Brian Boshier. Griffiths' batting was considered so inferior that his local club nicknamed him "the world’s worst batsman" and "the wally of the willow".

Ironically however, perhaps Griffiths' most celebrated achievement in his cricketing career came with the bat; playing Lancashire in the 1981 Natwest Trophy semi-final on Northamptonshire's home ground, Griffiths came in at number 11 with fellow tail-ender Tim Lamb still needing 13 runs to win, with one of the world's most fearsome fast bowlers of the period, Michael Holding, running in at one end. Somehow, both Griffiths and Lamb stood firm and held on, managing to accumulate the runs required, with Griffiths getting off the mark after twenty-nine balls and hitting the winning run and being carried off shoulder high by the partisan crowd. Three years later, Griffiths made eleven runs against Kent to level the scores and was run out attempting a bye off the last ball of the day, resulting in the first tie ever at Wantage Road.
