= 1979 Benson & Hedges Cup =

- Administrator: Test and County Cricket Board
- Cricket format: Limited overs cricket (55 overs per innings)
- Champions: Essex (1st title)
- Participants: 20
- Matches: 47
- Most runs: 591 Graham Gooch (Essex)
- Most wickets: 19 John Lever (Essex)

The 1979 Benson & Hedges Cup was the eighth competition of cricket's Benson & Hedges Cup. The competition was won by Essex County Cricket Club.

== Controversy ==
Going into the final round of matches in Group A, Somerset held a three-point lead over both Glamorgan and Worcestershire. Worcestershire were due to play Somerset at New Road while Glamorgan had an easy fixture against Minor Counties South at Watford.

It was mathematically possible for both Glamorgan and Worcestershire to overhaul Somerset in the table, and qualify for the quarter-finals, if both teams won (leaving all three on nine points) and their bowling strike rates improved and Somerset's worsened. Bowling strike rate was used as a tie-breaker in the event of teams finishing level on points.

In the match at Worcester, Somerset's captain Brian Rose won the toss and elected to bat. After one over, which yielded a no-ball, Rose declared, leaving Worcestershire a target of two which they knocked off in 10 balls. This left Somerset's strike rate intact. The action was in fact unnecessary as Glamorgan's match was washed out.

Although Rose was condemned, there was nothing in the Rules against a declaration in limited overs cricket at the time. The action was, however, viewed as being against the spirit of the game. By a vote of 17–1 at a meeting on 1 June, the TCCB ejected Somerset from the Benson & Hedges Cup, their place in the quarter-finals being taken by Glamorgan.

== Fixtures and results ==
=== Group stage ===
==== Group A ====
Team	Pld	W	L	NR	Pts	BowSR
Somerset^{1}	4	3	1	0	9	33.321
Worcestershire	4	3	1	0	9	36.920
Glamorgan	4	2	1	1	7	36.040
Gloucestershire	4	1	3	0	3	53.100
Minor Counties South	4	0	3	1	1	55.692

^{1} Somerset were ejected from the competition for bringing the game into disrepute after they declared at 1/0 after one over in their match against Worcestershire in order to ensure that they could not be overtaken on strike-rate.

==== Group B ====
Team	Pld	W	L	NR	Pts	BowSR
Warwickshire	4	4	0	0	12	39.786
Derbyshire	4	2	1	1	7	33.438
Lancashire	4	2	1	1	7	49.500
Leicestershire	4	1	3	0	3	50.731
Hampshire	4	0	4	0	0	73.941

==== Group C ====
Team	Pld	W	L	NR	Pts	BowSR
Surrey	4	3	1	0	9	34.972
Essex	4	3	1	0	9	39.774
Sussex	4	2	2	0	6	50.000
Northamptonshire	4	2	2	0	6	55.000
Oxford and Cambridge Universities	4	0	4	0	0	93.286

==== Group D ====
Team	Pld	W	L	NR	Pts	BowSR
Middlesex	4	3	0	1	10	35.227
Yorkshire	4	2	0	2	8	33.111
Nottinghamshire	4	2	1	1	7	41.903
Kent	4	1	3	0	3	35.139
Minor Counties North	4	0	4	0	0	123.143

=== Quarter-finals ===
6 June 1979
(scorecard)

Essex; 271/5 (55 overs)	v	Warwickshire; 227 all out (53.1 overs)
Graham Gooch 138; Steve Perryman 2/60 (11 overs)		David Smith 61; Norbert Phillip 2/30 (10.1 overs)

Essex won by 44 runs
County Ground, Chelmsford
Umpires: Ray Julian & Ken Palmer
Player of the match: Graham Gooch (Essex)

6 June 1979
(scorecard)

Glamorgan; 197/5 (55 overs)	v	Derbyshire; 199/4 (51.3 overs)
Peter Swart 75*; David Steele 2/29 (10 overs)		John Wright 101; Robin Hobbs 3/41 (10 overs)

Derbyshire won by 6 wickets
Sophia Gardens, Cardiff
Umpires: Dickie Bird & David Evans
Player of the match: John Wright (Derbyshire)

6 June 1979
(scorecard)

Middlesex; 107 all out (49 overs)	v	Yorkshire; 108/6 (47 overs)
Graham Barlow 21; Howard Cooper 4/28 (10 overs)		Kevin Sharp 22; Wayne Daniel 2/15 (11 overs)

Yorkshire won by 4 wickets
Lord's, London
Umpires: Barrie Meyer & Peter Wight
Player of the match: David Bairstow (Yorkshire)

6 June 1979
(scorecard)

Worcestershire; 199/7 (55 overs)	v	Surrey; 201/3 (50 overs)
Younis Ahmed 107; Sylvester Clarke 3/18 (11 overs)		Monte Lynch 67; James Cumbes 2/33 (11 overs)

Surrey won by 7 wickets
County Ground, Worcester
Umpires: Arthur Jepson & Don Oslear
Player of the match: Younis Ahmed (Worcestershire)

=== Semi-finals ===
4 July 1979
(scorecard)

Surrey; 166/8 (55 overs)	v	Derbyshire; 160 all out (53.2 overs)
Monte Lynch 49; Geoff Miller 3/23 (11 overs)		Peter Kirsten 70; Sylvester Clarke 3/31 (11 overs)

Surrey won by 6 runs
County Ground, Derby
Umpires: Ray Julian & Peter Wight
Player of the match: Peter Kirsten (Derbyshire)

4 July 1979
(scorecard)

Yorkshire; 173/9 (55 overs)	v	Essex; 174/7 (54 overs)
Richard Lumb 75; Ray East 2/25 (11 overs)		Graham Gooch 49; Arnie Sidebottom 3/35 (11 overs)

Essex won by 3 wickets
County Ground, Chelmsford
Umpires: Don Oslear & Alan Whitehead
Player of the match: Keith Pont (Essex)

=== Final ===
21 July 1979
(scorecard)

Essex; 290/6 (55 overs)	v	Surrey; 255 all out (51.4 overs)
Graham Gooch 120; Hugh Wilson 4/56 (11 overs)		Geoff Howarth 74; Norbert Phillip 3/42 (10 overs)

Essex won by 35 runs
Lord's, London
Umpires: Dickie Bird & Barrie Meyer
Player of the match: Graham Gooch (Essex)

== See also ==
- Benson & Hedges Cup
