= 1979 John Player League =

- Administrator(s): Test and County Cricket Board
- Cricket format: Limited overs cricket (40 overs per innings)
- Tournament format(s): League
- Champions: Somerset (1st title)
- Participants: 17
- Matches: 136
- Most runs: 668 Younis Ahmed (Worcestershire)
- Most wickets: 24 Derek Underwood (Kent)/John Lever (Essex)/Brian Brain (Gloucs)

The 1979 John Player League was the eleventh competing of what was generally known as the Sunday League. The competition was won for the first time by Somerset County Cricket Club.

== Standings ==
Team	Pld	W	T	L	N/R	A	Pts	R/R
Somerset (C)	16	12	0	3	0	1	50	4.257
Kent	16	11	0	3	0	2	48	4.185
Worcestershire	16	9	0	4	1	2	42	5.032
Middlesex	16	9	0	5	0	2	40	4.385
Yorkshire	16	8	0	4	1	3	40	4.322
Essex	16	8	0	6	1	1	36	4.277
Leicestershire	16	7	0	5	1	3	36	4.361
Gloucestershire	16	7	0	7	0	2	32	4.414
Nottinghamshire	16	6	0	6	1	3	32	4.376
Hampshire	16	7	0	8	0	1	30	4.368
Lancashire	16	6	0	7	3	0	30	4.154
Glamorgan	16	6	0	10	0	0	24	4.108
Northamptonshire	16	5	0	9	1	1	24	4.170
Surrey	16	5	0	9	1	1	24	4.255
Sussex	16	6	0	10	0	0	24	4.220
Derbyshire	16	4	0	9	0	3	22	4.065
Warwickshire	16	2	0	13	0	1	10	4.694
Team marked (C) finished as champions. Source: CricketArchive

== See also ==
- Sunday League
