= Dennis Breakwell =

English cricketer (1948–2026)

Personal information
- Full name: Dennis Breakwell
- Born: 2 July 1948; Brierley Hill, Staffordshire, England
- Died: 8 November 2026 (aged 78); Taunton, Somerset, England
- Height: 5 ft 9 in (1.75 m)
- Batting: Left-handed
- Bowling: Slow left-arm orthodox
- Role: All-rounder

Domestic team information
- Years: Team
- 1969–1972: Northamptonshire
- 1973–1984: Somerset
- FC debut: 21 June 1969 Northants v Oxford University
- Last FC: 18 June 1983 Somerset v Derbyshire
- LA debut: 3 August 1969 Northants v Surrey
- Last LA: 1 August 1984 Somerset v Kent

Career statistics
Competition	First-class	LA
Matches	231	186
Runs scored	4,792	1,386
Batting average	19.80	14.14
100s/50s	1/16	0/0
Top score	100*	44*
Balls bowled	30,220	3,875
Wickets	422	86
Bowling average	30.84	30.17
5 wickets in innings	12	0
10 wickets in match	1	0
Best bowling	8/39	4/10
Catches/stumpings	80/–	40/–
- Source: CricketArchive, 13 February 2010

Dennis Breakwell (2 July 1948 – 8 November 2026) was English first-class cricketer who made over 400 appearances between 1969 and 1984 playing for Northamptonshire and Somerset County Cricket Clubs. A left-handed batsman and slow left-arm orthodox bowler, Breakwell developed into an all-rounder as his career progressed, and he featured in a series of strong sides at Northampton alongside Colin Milburn and Sarfraz Nawaz and at Somerset alongside Joel Garner, Viv Richards and Ian Botham, rooming with the latter two in his early days at the club. Following the end of his playing career he became coach and head groundsman at King's College, Taunton coaching among others England batsman Jos Buttler and Somerset's Alex Barrow and Tom Webley.

== Biography ==
Dennis Breakwell was born in Brierley Hill, Staffordshire, England, on 2 July 1948, to John (Jack) Breakwell and Florence Emily Talbot.

Breakwell's only first-class century came against the New Zealanders at Taunton in July 1978. His best bowling figures, 8 for 39, came when Northamptonshire beat Kent by an innings and 54 runs at Dover in 1970: his victims included Mike Denness, Colin Cowdrey, John Shepherd, Alan Knott and Derek Underwood.

He was hit for six consecutive sixes (not in the same over) by South African all-rounder Mike Procter in the Gloucestershire versus Somerset County Championship match at Taunton on the 27th of August, 1979.

Breakwell died in November 2026, aged 78.
