= Clarence Park, Weston-super-Mare =

Public park in Somerset, England

Coordinates: 51°20′11.60″N 2°58′39.25″W

Clarence Park
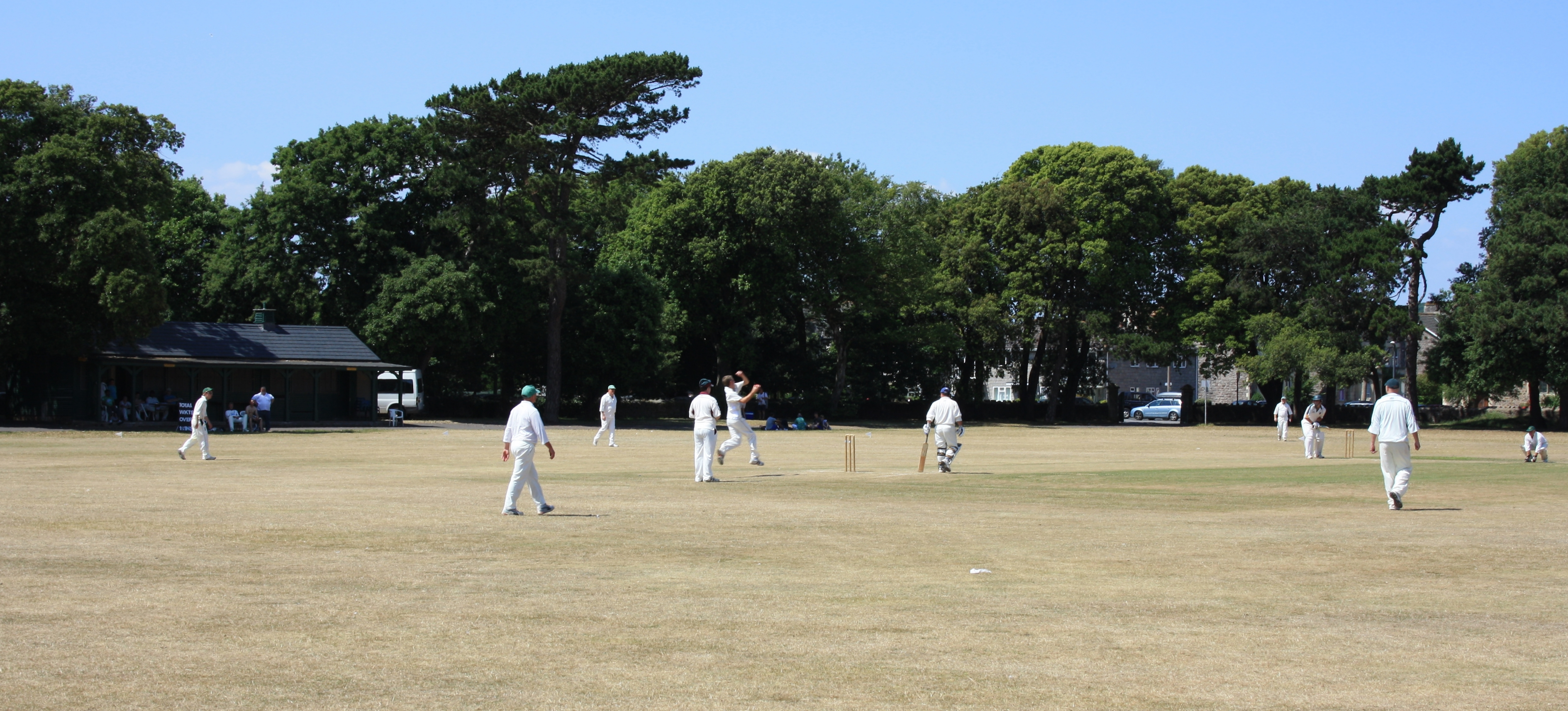
- Interactive map of Clarence Park

Ground information
- Location: Weston-super-Mare, Somerset
- Country: England
- Establishment: 1882
- Capacity: 6,000
- End names
- Clarence Road North End; Clarence Road South End

Team information
Somerset	(1914–1996)
- As of 6 October 2009; Source: Ground profile

Clarence Park was given to the town of Weston-super-Mare, England, by Rebecca Davies in memory of her husband. The cricket pavilion at the park dates from 1882. A multitude of sports have been played at the park, including cricket. The ground is owned by the local council. It is currently used by Weston-super-Mare Cricket Club.

== Layout ==
The park is laid out in two sections. The western section is considerably the larger and is separated from the eastern section by Walliscote Road. The eastern section is a large trapezoidal area of flat open lawn, with an encircling pathway; outside the pathway, there is a wide band of less manicured land heavily populated with mature trees. The lawned area (pictured) is often used to host cricket matches. The cricket pavilion is at the western edge, backing onto Walliscote Road. Part of the southern edge of the lawn is marked out for use as a croquet pitch; croquet matches are frequently held during the summer months. During recent years, this eastern section of Clarence Park has been used as a drop-off and pickup zone for the T4 on the Beach music event.

The western section of the park is laid out as a more formal park with mature trees, flower beds, lawned areas, and a fish pond with fountain. Part of the southern end of this section is taken up by the clubhouse and 3 greens of the Clarence Bowling Club. At the north end, near Walliscote Road, there is a house originally used as the park-keeper's lodge. There is a children's play area near the western edge. Approximately in the centre of the western section of the park, there is a small pavilion, operated in recent years as a cafe. The future of the cafe is currently under threat as a result of an arson attack which took place in early September 2011. Since this time, the cafe has had a number of operators under a lease managed by North Somerset Council.

== Cricket ==
The park played host to home matches for Somerset between 1914 and 1996.

In 1936 there was talk about moving the Weston festival away from Clarence Park, a move strongly resisted by Jack White, who thought the ground to be "lovely".
