= Keith Jennings (cricketer) =

English cricketer (1953–2024)

Personal information
- Full name: Keith Francis Jennings
- Born: 5 October 1953; Wellington, Somerset, England
- Died: 4 June 2024 (aged 70); Taunton, Somerset, England
- Height: 5 ft 11 in (1.80 m)
- Batting: Right-handed
- Bowling: Right-arm medium
- Role: Bowler

Domestic team information
- Years: Team
- 1975–1981: Somerset
- FC debut: 18 June 1975 Somerset v Leicestershire
- Last FC: 4 August 1981 Somerset v Yorkshire
- LA debut: 8 June 1975 Somerset v Derbyshire
- Last LA: 2 August 1981 Somerset v Yorkshire

Career statistics
Competition	First-class	List A
Matches	68	88
Runs scored	521	233
Batting average	10.63	9.70
100s/50s	0/0	0/1
Top score	49	51*
Balls bowled	7,771	4,052
Wickets	96	104
Bowling average	35.44	24.70
5 wickets in innings	1	0
10 wickets in match	0	0
Best bowling	5/18	4/11
Catches/stumpings	47/–	15/–
- Source: CricketArchive, 23 May 2010

Keith Francis Jennings (5 October 1953 – 4 June 2024) played first-class and List A cricket for Somerset County Cricket Club from 1975 to 1981. He was a right-handed lower-order batsman and a right-arm medium pace bowler.

Jennings was a carpenter and joiner by trade who modelled his medium-paced bowling on that of Tom Cartwright and was one of Cartwright's successors as the defensive bowling heart of Somerset's successful one-day cricket side of the late 1970s. He made his first-class and List A debuts in 1975 and the following year was a regular member of Somerset's one-day team. Initially, his batting showed promise, and against the West Indies in 1976 he made 49 of an 82-run eighth wicket partnership with his captain, Brian Close, whose own watchful innings of 88 earned him a recall to the England team at the age of 45. Later that year, his 51 not out took Somerset from a parlous 116 for seven to a three-wicket victory with three balls to spare against Nottinghamshire at Nottingham. But his batting declined markedly and in 1979, when he played in 19 of Somerset's first-class matches, he made only 19 runs all season.

But Jennings's principal role was as a tidy, dependable bowler, mainly in one-day cricket. His figures scarcely show many highlights, but his record of being consistently selected alongside stars such as Ian Botham, Joel Garner and Viv Richards indicates a value not measured in wickets. In 1978, he took 40 first-class wickets, the most he achieved in a season, and was awarded his county cap. The bowling included a return of five for 18 in 23.5 overs in the match against Sussex at Hove. That was his only five-wicket haul in senior cricket. Yet with all the stars available he was picked for both the crucial matches at the end of the season when it seemed that Somerset might at last win a trophy: in the event, the county lost both the Gillette Cup final to Sussex and the final John Player League match to Essex and missed out on both trophies.

The following season, 1979, Jennings was again a regular and he also played in most of Somerset's first-class matches, though he took only 20 first-class wickets in the season. At the end of the season, Somerset arrived at exactly the same position as in the previous year – finalists in the Gillette Cup and with a chance of winning the Sunday 40-over competition. This time, both titles were won, though Jennings appeared in only the Gillette Cup final, where he bowled his 12 overs for just 29 runs, the most economical of the Somerset bowlers.

In 1980, Somerset lost the services of Garner (and Richards) to the West Indies tour, and new players were introduced to cover the gaps. With a changing side, Jennings lost his regular place in mid-season and did not regain it. Apart from a couple of first-team appearances, he played in 1981 largely for the second eleven and with his contract due for renewal at the end of the season, he chose not to have it renewed, and left county cricket.

Jennings's death at Musgrove Park Hospital in Taunton was announced by Somerset on 6 June 2024.
