= Vic Marks =

English sports journalist

Personal information
- Full name: Victor James Marks
- Born: 25 June 1955 (age 71); Middle Chinnock, Somerset, England
- Nickname: Skid, Speedy
- Height: 5 ft 9 in (1.75 m)
- Batting: Right-handed
- Bowling: Right-arm off break
- Role: All-rounder
- Relatives: Joseph Eckland (nephew)

International information
- National side: England
- Test debut (cap 499): 26 August 1982 v Pakistan
- Last Test: 19 March 1984 v Pakistan
- ODI debut (cap 55): 30 May 1980 v West Indies
- Last ODI: 4 September 1988 v Sri Lanka

Domestic team information
- Years: Team
- 1975–1978: Oxford University
- 1975–1989: Somerset
- 1986-87: Western Australia

Career statistics
Competition	Test	ODI	FC	LA
Matches	6	34	342	304
Runs scored	249	285	12,419	4,175
Batting average	27.66	13.57	30.29	22.56
100s/50s	0/3	0/0	5/73	0/14
Top score	83	44	134	81*
Balls bowled	1,082	1,838	63,052	13,039
Wickets	11	44	859	286
Bowling average	44.00	25.79	33.28	27.85
5 wickets in innings	0	2	40	3
10 wickets in match	0	0	5	0
Best bowling	3/78	5/20	8/17	5/20
Catches/stumpings	0/–	8/–	145/–	75/–
- Source: CricInfo, 21 December 2008

Victor James Marks (born 25 June 1955) is an English sports journalist and former professional cricketer.

An off spin bowler, Marks played in six Test matches and thirty four One Day Internationals for England. His entire county cricket career was spent with Somerset, spanning the period between 1975 and 1989. Marks also played for Oxford University whilst a student and had one season playing in Western Australia, winning the Sheffield Shield 1986–87.

After retiring as a player, Marks became a cricket journalist. He wrote match reports and opinion pieces for The Guardian and The Observer newspapers, and contributes to BBC Radio's Test Match Special as a summariser.

== Playing career ==
Marks was born on 25 June 1955 in Middle Chinnock, Somerset. He was educated at Blundell's School and Oxford University, for whom he played cricket between 1975 and 1978 (alongside Imran Khan and Chris Tavaré, and opposite Peter Roebuck of Cambridge University, subsequently Marks' captain at Somerset). Marks captained Oxford University in 1976 and 1977.

Marks made his first-class debut for Somerset in the 1975 County Championship. Even in a Somerset team coming into a successful period, with high-profile players, notably Viv Richards and Ian Botham, Marks at times stood out, especially in List A cricket. In 1982 he was man of the match in the final as Somerset won the Benson and Hedges Cup, an achievement he repeated in 1983 as Somerset won the NatWest Bank Trophy.

Marks had made his debut for the national team in 1980, in an ODI against the West Indies. His Test debut was in 1982 against Pakistan. In a series decider, Marks made two crucial interventions at tense stages, dismissing Sikander Bakht and joining Bob Taylor in the partnership that clinched victory. However, the dismissal of Sikander was contested, and inadvertently helped to trigger a sequence which led to the stand off between Shakoor Rana and Mike Gatting five years later.

He went on to play six Test matches, struggling a little to take wickets but adding useful late-order runs, especially in Pakistan in 1984. His strength in limited-over cricket made him an important member of the ODI squad during the 1980s, appearing thirty four times and taking forty four wickets at a bowling average of 25.79. His haul of five for 20 for England against New Zealand in 1984 was for sixteen years England's best bowling return in One Day Internationals; it remains the best one-day figures by an England spin bowler. Marks was the first England bowler to take two ODI five-wicket hauls (having previously taken five wickets against Sri Lanka in 1983, during the Cricket World Cup). This feat was subsequently emulated by the seam bowlers Darren Gough, Mark Ealham and Andrew Flintoff; the first spin bowler to equal Marks' record was Adil Rashid in 2019.

Marks had a distinguished first-class career between 1975 and 1989 for Somerset. He also played a season for Western Australia in the 1986–87 season, winning the Sheffield Shield. In 342 first-class matches he took 859 wickets at 33.28, and scored 12,419 runs at a batting average of 30.29.

As a cricketer he was popular and well-liked; Wisden editor, Matthew Engel, labelled him "a mild, nervy, self-deprecating farm boy with an Oxford degree and no enemies". This was an unusual distinction in the Somerset team of the 1980s, where three explosive personalities, Viv Richards, Joel Garner and Ian Botham, had a dispute with captain Peter Roebuck, which resulted in Somerset (under the influence from Roebuck and new club secretary Tony Brown) opting not to renew Richards' and Garner's contracts in 1986, and Botham leaving the club in protest.

The cricket correspondent Colin Bateman noted that "in typical self-deprecating style, Vic Marks entitled one of his books, Marks Out of XI. He was probably out of the England XI slightly too often. While he was never a fashionable cricketer, he was a determined and highly effective off-spinner-cum-batsman whose Test figures stand comparison with those often picked ahead of him, such as Geoff Miller and Eddie Hemmings".

== Journalism ==
After retiring as a professional cricketer, he turned his hand to journalism and broadcasting, and worked as a regular summariser on Test Match Special. He wrote regularly about cricket and occasionally rugby union for The Observer newspaper as their Cricket Correspondent, and also for The Guardian. He retired from this role in 2020.

As of December 2022, Marks was serving as a director at Somerset CCC, having previously held the position of Chairman of the Cricket Committee.

== Other writing ==
Marks published a diary of the England tours of India and Australia while still player. Since retiring from The Observer/Guardian he has published three further books.

== Books published ==
- Marks Out of XI: England's Winter Tour of India and Australia, 1984-1985, Allen & Unwin. 1985.
- The Test & County Cricket Board Guide to Better Cricket, Octopus, 1987.
- Original Spin: Misadventures in Cricket, Allen & Unwin. 2019.
- Late Cuts: Musings on Cricket, Allen & Unwin. 2021.
- The Cricket Captains of England 1979 - 2025, Fairfield Books, 2025.

Sporting positions
Preceded by Peter Roebuck	Somerset County Cricket Captain; 1989	Succeeded by Chris Tavaré
