= Brian Rose (cricketer) =

English cricketer

Personal information
- Full name: Brian Charles Rose
- Born: 4 June 1950 (age 76); Dartford, Kent, England
- Nickname: Rosey, Harry
- Batting: Left-handed
- Bowling: Left-arm medium
- Role: Batsman

International information
- National side: England
- Test debut (cap 476): 14 December 1977 v Pakistan
- Last Test: 13 February 1981 v West Indies
- ODI debut (cap 44): 23 December 1977 v Pakistan
- Last ODI: 30 December 1977 v Pakistan

Domestic team information
- Years: Team
- 1969–1987: Somerset

Career statistics
Competition	Test	ODI	FC	LA
Matches	9	2	270	258
Runs scored	358	99	13,236	5,846
Batting average	25.57	49.50	33.25	27.70
100s/50s	0/2	0/1	25/53	3/29
Top score	70	54	205	137*
Balls bowled	–	–	445	204
Wickets	–	–	8	7
Bowling average	–	–	36.12	3/25
5 wickets in innings	–	–	0	0
10 wickets in match	–	–	0	0
Best bowling	–	–	3/9	3/25
Catches/stumpings	4/–	1/–	124/–	65/–
- Source: Cricinfo, 21 August 2009

Brian Charles Rose (born 4 June 1950) is an English former cricketer, who played in nine Test matches and two One Day Internationals (ODIs) for the England cricket team between 1977 and 1981.

== Biography ==
Rose was educated at Weston-super-Mare Grammar School for Boys. He trained as a teacher before pursuing a successful county career with Somerset. A left-handed opening batsman, he succeeded Brian Close as captain in 1978, and he led the county to their first ever trophies, the Gillette Cup and the John Player League, in 1979. The team was a potent blend of world-class match winners in Ian Botham, Viv Richards and Joel Garner, county professionals and keen youngsters.

Rose made the infamous decision to declare Somerset's innings closed in a 1979 Benson and Hedges Cup zonal match after one over, to ensure their progress through the group on run-rate. While within the rules, Somerset were ejected from the competition for bringing the game into disrepute, and Rose was condemned in the press.

Rose was called up by England for the 1977–8 tours of Pakistan and New Zealand, after a number of players (such as Dennis Amiss, Bob Woolmer and Tony Greig) became unavailable due to their involvement in World Series Cricket. Initially he struggled in Test cricket, although he did make 54 on his one-day international debut, and he was dropped for two years after his fifth Test.

Helped perhaps by Ian Botham's captaincy of England, Rose was recalled to the Test team in 1980, and batted as well as anyone against the fearsome West Indies attack in 1980, making 243 runs at 48.60, including a highest Test score of 70 (out of a total of 150) at Old Trafford. He developed eye problems, had to return early from the tour of West Indies that year, and batted with glasses for the rest of his career.

In 270 first-class matches he scored 13,236 runs at 33.25 with a career best of 205. He resumed teaching after retiring from the first-class game, but maintained his involvement with Somerset. In 2007 he was named part of the committee to review English cricket after the defeat in the 2006–7 Ashes series. A past Chairman of Cricket, he became the Director of Cricket at Taunton, but stood down at the end of the 2012 season. In 2013 he was reported to be working as a consultant with Glamorgan.

Sporting positions
Preceded by Brian Close	Somerset County Cricket Captain; 1978–1984	Succeeded by Ian Botham
