= England at the Cricket World Cup =

The England cricket team have appeared in every edition of the Cricket World Cup to date, being crowned champions in 2019. In addition, they were losing finalists in 1979, 1987 and 1992. England have been eliminated from the tournament in the group stage on five occasions (1999, 2003, 2007, 2015 and 2023)

England were the inaugural hosts of the World Cup, in 1975. The country has since hosted the tournament a further four times; in 1979, 1983, 1999 and 2019, the most of any country.

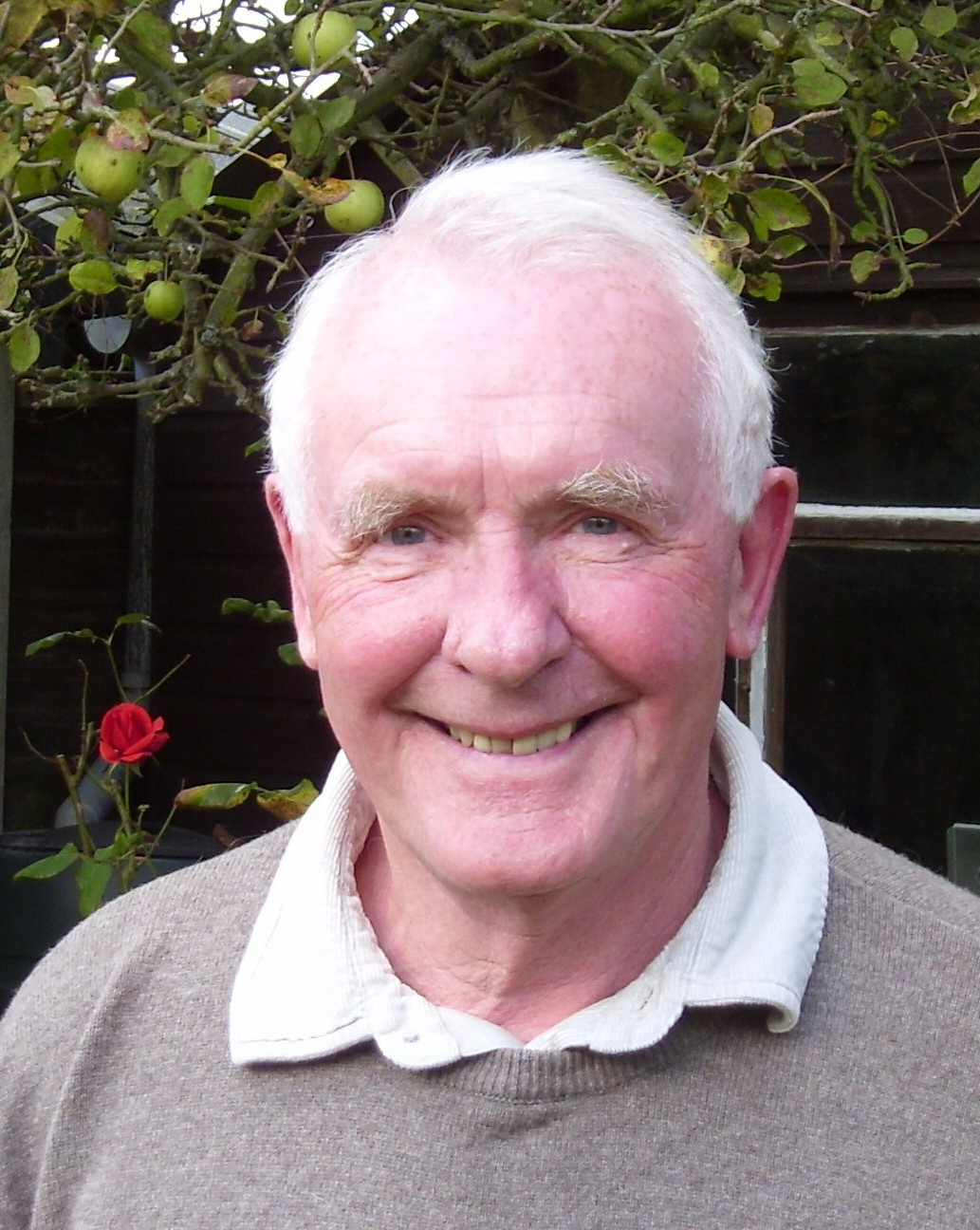
Mike Denness was the England captain for the first Cricket World Cup in 1975.

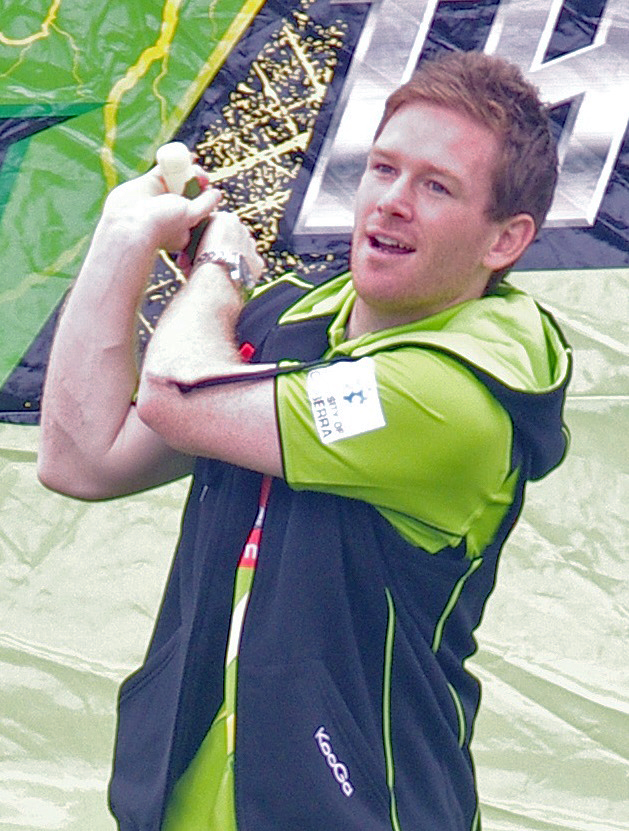
Eoin Morgan is the former England ODI captain, and captained the side in the 2015 and 2019 Cricket World Cup. He represented Ireland in 2007, and England in 2011, 2015 and 2019.

== Cricket World Cup performances ==
Key
Champions
Runners-up
Semi-finals
Host

World Cup record									Qualification record				
Year	Round	Position	GP	W	L	T	NR	Win %	Pld	W	L	T	NR
(England) 1975	Semi-final	3/8	4	3	1	0	0	75.00	No qualifiers held				
(England) 1979	Runners-up	2/8	5	4	1	0	0	80.00	Did not enter (qualified directly as full member)				
(England) 1983	Semi-final	3/8	7	5	2	0	0	71.43	Did not enter (qualified directly as full member)				
(India) (Pakistan) 1987	Runners-up	2/8	8	5	3	0	0	62.50	Did not enter (qualified directly as full member)				
(Australia) (New Zealand) 1992	Runners-up	2/9	10	6	3	0	1	60.00	Did not enter (qualified directly as full member)				
(India) (Pakistan) (Sri Lanka) 1996	Quarter-finals	8/12	6	2	4	0	0	33.33	Did not enter (qualified directly as full member)				
(England) (Wales) 1999	Pool stage	8/12	5	3	2	0	0	60.00	Did not enter (qualified directly as full member)				
(South Africa) (Zimbabwe) (Kenya) 2003	Pool stage	9/14	6	3	3	0	0	50.00	Did not enter (qualified directly as full member)				
(Cricket West Indies) 2007	Super 8	5/16	9	5	4	0	0	55.55	Did not enter (qualified directly as full member)				
(India) (Sri Lanka) (Bangladesh) 2011	Quarter-finals	7/14	7	3	3	1	0	42.86	Did not enter (qualified directly as full member)				
(Australia) (New Zealand) 2015	Pool stage	10/14	6	2	4	0	0	33.33	Did not enter (qualified directly as full member)				
(England) (Wales) 2019	Champions	1/10	11	8	3	0	0	68.18	Qualified via ODI rankings (3rd place)				
(India) 2023	League stage	7/10	9	3	6	0	0	33.33					
Total	1 title	13/13	93	52	39	1	1						

*The win percentage excludes no results and counts ties as half a win.

== Tournament results ==
=== 1975 World Cup ===
Squad

- Mike Denness (c)
- Dennis Amiss
- Geoff Arnold
- Keith Fletcher
- Tony Greig
- Frank Hayes
- John Jameson (wk)
- Alan Knott (wk)
- Peter Lever
- Chris Old
- John Snow
- Derek Underwood
- Barry Wood

Source: ESPNcricinfo

Results

Group stage				Semifinal	Final	Overall Result
Opposition Result	Opposition Result	Opposition Result	Rank	Opposition Result	Opposition Result	Overall Result
India; W by 202 runs	New Zealand; W by 80 runs	East Africa; W by 196 runs	1	Australia; L by 4 wickets	Did not advance	Semi-finals

Scorecards

Group stage (Group A)

7 June 1975
Scorecard

England; 334/4 (60 overs)	v	India; 132/3 (60 overs)
Dennis Amiss 137 (147); Syed Abid Ali 2/58 (12.0)		Gundappa Viswanath 37 (59); Peter Lever 1/16 (10.0)

England won by 202 runs
Lord's, London
Umpires: David Constant (Eng) and John Langridge (Eng)
Player of the match: Dennis Amiss (Eng)

- England won the toss and elected to bat.

11 June 1975
Scorecard

England; 266/6 (60 overs)	v	New Zealand; 186 (60 overs)
Keith Fletcher 131 (147); Tony Greig 4/45 (12 overs)		John Morrison 55 (85); Richard Collinge 2/43 (12 overs)

England won by 80 runs
Trent Bridge, Nottingham
Umpires: Bill Alley (Aus) and Tom Spencer (Eng)
Player of the match: Keith Fletcher (Eng)

- New Zealand won the toss and elected to field.

14 June 1975
Scorecard

England; 290/5 (60 overs)	v	East Africa; 94 (52.3 overs)
Dennis Amiss 88 (116); John Snow 4/11 (12 overs)		Ramesh Sethi 30 (102); Zulfiqar Ali 3/63 (12 overs)

England won by 196 runs
Edgbaston, Birmingham
Umpires: Bill Alley (Aus) and John Langridge (Eng)
Player of the match: John Snow (Eng)

- East Africa won the toss, and elected to field.

Knockout stage

Semi-final 1
18 June 1975
Scorecard

England; 93 (36.2 overs)	v	Australia; 94/6 (28.4 overs)
Mike Denness 27 (60); Chris Old 3/29 (7 overs)		Gary Gilmour 28* (28); Gary Gilmour 6/14 (12 overs)

Australia won by 4 wickets
Headingley, Leeds
Umpires: Bill Alley (Aus) and David Constant (Eng)
Player of the match: Gary Gilmour (Aus)

Summary

The inaugural Cricket World Cup was hosted in 1975 by England, the only nation able to put forward the resources to stage an event of such magnitude at the time, The matches consisted of 60 six-ball overs per team, played during the daytime in traditional form, with the players wearing cricket whites and using red cricket balls. England won all their group stage matches but lost in their semi-final match against Australia.

In the semi-final, England were reduced to 37/7, as Gary Gilmour took 6/14, the best World Cup bowling figures at the time They were eventually bowled out for 93 in 36.2 overs. Australia initially suffered a collapse just as dramatic, falling to 39/6, before Gary Gilmour scored 28 from 28 balls, to help Australia to victory.

=== 1979 World Cup ===
Squad

- Mike Brearley (c) & (wk)
- Ian Botham
- Geoffrey Boycott
- Phil Edmonds
- Mike Gatting
- Graham Gooch
- David Gower
- Mike Hendrick
- Wayne Larkins
- Geoff Miller
- Chris Old
- Derek Randall
- Bob Taylor (wk)
- Bob Willis

Source: ESPNcricinfo

Results

Group stage				Semifinal	Final	Overall Result
Opposition Result	Opposition Result	Opposition Result	Rank	Opposition Result	Opposition Result	Overall Result
Australia; W by 6 wickets	Canada; W by 8 wickets	Pakistan; W by 14 runs	1	New Zealand; W by 9 runs	West Indies; L by 92 runs	Runners-up

Scorecards

Group stage (Group A)

9 June 1979
Scorecard

Australia; 159/9 (60 overs)	v	England; 160/4 (47.1 overs)
Andrew Hilditch 47 (108); Geoffrey Boycott 2/15 (6 overs)		Graham Gooch 53 (96); Trevor Laughlin 2/38 (9.1 overs)

England won by 6 wickets
Lord's, London, England
Umpires: David Constant (Eng) and Barrie Meyer (Eng)
Player of the match: Graham Gooch (Eng)

14 June 1979
Scorecard

Canada; 45 (40.3 overs)	v	England; 46/2 (13.5 overs)
Franklyn Dennis 21 (99); Chris Old 4/8 (10 overs)		Graham Gooch 21* (31); Robert Callender 1/14 (6 overs)

England won by 8 wickets
Old Trafford, Manchester, England
Umpires: John Langridge (Eng) and Barrie Meyer (Eng)
Player of the match: Chris Old (Eng)

- Reserve day used; June 13 washed out.

16 June 1979
Scorecard

England; 165/9 (60 overs)	v	Pakistan; 151 (56 overs)
Graham Gooch 33 (90); Majid Khan 3/27 (12 overs)		Asif Iqbal 51 (104); Mike Hendrick 4/15 (12 overs)

England won by 14 runs
Headingley, Leeds, England
Umpires: Lloyd Budd (Eng) and David Evans (Eng)
Player of the match: Mike Hendrick (Eng)

Knockout stage
Semi-final 1

June 20, 1979
Scorecard

England; 221/8 (60 overs)	v	New Zealand; 212/9 (60 overs)
Graham Gooch 71 (84); Brian McKechnie 2/46 (12 overs)		John Wright 69 (137); Mike Hendrick 3/55 (12 overs)

England won by 9 runs
Old Trafford, Manchester, England
Umpires: John Langridge and Ken Palmer
Player of the match: Graham Gooch

- England qualified for the final for the first time.

Final

June 23, 1979
Scorecard

West Indies; 286/9 (60 overs)	v	England; 194 all out (51 overs)
Viv Richards 138* (157); Phil Edmonds 2/40 (12 overs)		Mike Brearley 64 (130); Joel Garner 5/38 (11 overs)

West Indies won by 92 runs
Lord's, London, England
Umpires: Dickie Bird and Barrie Meyer
Player of the match: Viv Richards

Summary

The 1979 Cricket World Cup was once again held in England. England won all of their group matches, and defeated New Zealand in a close semi-final by 9 runs. In the final, they lost to the West Indies.

In the semi-final, England began badly, falling to 38/2, before Mike Brearley (53 from 115 balls) and Graham Gooch (71 from 84 balls) resurrected the innings. Derek Randall (42 from 50 balls) scored quickly in the second half of the innings, and 25 runs from the last 3 overs of the innings saw England reach 221/8 from their 60 overs. In response, New Zealand reached 47 from 16 overs, before Bruce Edgar was out lbw. John Wright top-scored with 69 from 137 balls, before being run out. However, New Zealand continued to lose wickets, and they required 14 runs from the last over of the match, and England won by 9 runs, at the time the smallest winning margin by runs in World Cup matches.

In the final, the West Indies got off to a bad start, falling to 99/4. However, a "match winning performance" of 138 from 157 balls from Vivian Richards, and an aggressive innings from Collis King (86 from 66 balls) consolidated the innings with a 139 run partnership, as the West Indies scored 286/9 from 60 overs. In reply, the English openers, Mike Brearley (64 from 130 balls) and Geoff Boycott (57 from 105 balls), scored very slowly. They put together a very methodical opening partnership of 129 runs in 38 overs, but by the time both batsmen were out, the run rate had risen too high. Graham Gooch played some hefty strokes in scoring his 32, taking England to 183/2. However, the loss of Gooch triggered the biggest collapse in World Cup history, as England lost 8/11; Joel Garner took 5/3 in 11 balls. They were eventually all out for 194 in 51 overs.

=== 1983 World Cup ===
Squad

- Bob Willis (c)
- Paul Allott
- Ian Botham
- Norman Cowans
- Graham Dilley
- Graeme Fowler (wk)
- Mike Gatting
- Ian Gould (wk)
- David Gower
- Trevor Jesty
- Allan Lamb
- Vic Marks
- Derek Randall
- Chris Tavaré

Results

Group stage							Semifinal	Final	Overall Result
Opposition Result	Opposition Result	Opposition Result	Opposition Result	Opposition Result	Opposition Result	Rank	Opposition Result	Opposition Result	Overall Result
New Zealand; W by 106 runs	Sri Lanka; W by 47 runs	Pakistan; W by 8 Wickets	New Zealand; L by 2 wickets	Pakistan; W by 7 wickets	Sri Lanka; W by 9 Wickets	1	India; L by 6 wickets	Did not advance	Semi-finals

Scorecards

Group stage (Group A)

9 June 1983
Scorecard

England; 322/6 (60 overs)	v	New Zealand; 216 (59 overs)
Allan Lamb 102 (105); Martin Snedden 2/105 (12 overs)		Martin Crowe 97 (118); Bob Willis 2/9 (7 overs)

England won by 106 runs
The Oval, London, England
Umpires: Barrie Meyer and Don Oslear
Player of the match: Allan Lamb

11 June 1983
Scorecard

England; 333/9 (60 overs)	v	Sri Lanka; 286 (58 overs)
David Gower 130 (120); Ashantha de Mel 2/62 (12 overs)		Guy de Alwis 58 (51); Vic Marks 5/39 (12 overs)

England won by 47 runs
County Ground, Taunton, England
Umpires: Mervyn Kitchen and Ken Palmer
Player of the match: David Gower

13 June 1983
Scorecard

Pakistan; 193/8 (60 overs)	v	England; 199/2 (50.4 overs)
Zaheer Abbas 83 (104); Bob Willis 2/24 (12 overs)		Graeme Fowler 78* (151); Rashid Khan 1/19 (7 overs)

England won by 8 wickets
Lord's, London, England
Umpires: Barrie Meyer and Alan Whitehead
Player of the match: Zaheer Abbas

15 June 1983
Scorecard

England; 234 (55.2 overs)	v	New Zealand; 238/8 (59.5 overs)
David Gower 92* (96 balls); Richard Hadlee 3/32 (10 overs)		Jeremy Coney 66* (97 balls); Bob Willis 4/42 (12 overs)

New Zealand won by 2 wickets
Edgbaston, Birmingham, England
Umpires: Jack Birkenshaw and Ken Palmer
Player of the match: Jeremy Coney

18 June 1983
Scorecard

Pakistan; 232/8 (60 overs)	v	England; 233/3 (57.2 overs)
Javed Miandad 67 (100); Vic Marks 2/45 (12 overs)		Graeme Fowler 69 (96); Mudassar Nazar 2/34 (12 overs)

England won by 7 wickets
Old Trafford, Manchester, England
Umpires: Dickie Bird and Don Oslear
Player of the match: Graeme Fowler

20 June 1983
Scorecard

Sri Lanka; 136 (50.4 overs)	v	England; 137/1 (24.1 overs)
Sidath Wettimuny 22 (49); Paul Allott 3/41 (10.4 overs)		Graeme Fowler 81 (77); Ashantha de Mel 1/33 (10 overs)

England won by 9 wickets
Headingley, Leeds, England
Umpires: Barrie Leadbeater and Ken Palmer
Player of the match: Bob Willis

Knockout stage

Semi-final 1
22 June 1983
Scorecard

England; 213 (60 overs)	v	India; 217/4 (54.4 overs)
G Fowler 33 (59); Kapil Dev 3/35 (11)		Yashpal Sharma 61 (115); Paul Allott 1/40 (10)

India won by 6 wickets
Old Trafford, Manchester, England
Umpires: David Evans and Don Oslear (Eng)
Player of the match: M Amarnath (Ind)

Summary

England were the host nation for the third consecutive tournament. They won 5 of their 6 group stage matches, losing against New Zealand, and qualified for the semi-final. In the semi-final, they were defeated by India "with great ease".

In the semi-final, England batted first, and reached 69 before losing opener Chris Tavaré. Medium pacer Mohinder Amarnath and off-spinner Kirti Azad helped slow the scoring rate, as England only managed 213 from their 60 overs. In reply, Yashpal Sharma (61 from 115 balls) and Sandeep Patil (51 from 32 balls) made half-centuries, and Amarnath and Yashpal's managed a 92 run partnership. India reached their target in 54.4 overs, winning the match by 6 wickets.

=== 1987 World Cup ===
Squad

- Mike Gatting (c)
- Bill Athey
- Chris Broad
- Phillip DeFreitas
- Paul Downton (wk)
- John Emburey
- Neil Foster
- Graham Gooch
- Eddie Hemmings
- Allan Lamb
- Derek Pringle
- Tim Robinson
- Gladstone Small

Results

Group stage							Semifinal	Final	Overall Result
Opposition Result	Opposition Result	Opposition Result	Opposition Result	Opposition Result	Opposition Result	Rank	Opposition Result	Opposition Result	Overall Result
West Indies; W by 2 wickets	Pakistan; L by 18 runs	Sri Lanka; W by 108 runs	Pakistan; L by 7 wickets	West Indies; W by 34 runs	Sri Lanka; W by 8 Wickets	2	India; W by 35 runs	Australia; L by 7 runs	Runners-up

Scorecards

Group stage (Group B)

9 October 1987
Scorecard

West Indies; 243/7 (50 overs)	v	England; 246/8 (49.3 overs)
Richie Richardson 53 (80); Neil Foster 3/53 (10 overs)		Allan Lamb 67* (68); Carl Hooper 3/42 (10 overs)

England won by 2 wickets
Municipal Stadium, Gujranwala, Pakistan
Umpires: Tony Crafter (Australia) and Ram Gupta (India)
Player of the match: Allan Lamb (England)

12 October 1987
Scorecard

Pakistan; 239/7 (50 overs)	v	England; 221 (48.4 overs)
Saleem Malik 65 (80); Phillip DeFreitas 3/42 (10 overs)		Mike Gatting 43 (47); Abdul Qadir 4/31 (10 overs)

Pakistan won by 18 runs
Pindi Club Ground, Rawalpindi, Pakistan
Umpires: Tony Crafter (Australia) and Ram Gupta (India)
Player of the match: Abdul Qadir (Pakistan)

- Play was abandoned due to rain on 12 October. Reserve day on 13 October used.

17 October 1987
Scorecard

England; 296/4 (50 overs)	v	Sri Lanka; 158/8 (45 overs)
Graham Gooch 84 (100); Ravi Ratnayeke 2/62 (9 overs)		Arjuna Ranatunga 40 (67); John Emburey 2/26 (10 overs)

England won by 108 runs
Arbab Niaz Stadium, Peshawar, Pakistan
Umpires: V. K. Ramaswamy (India) and Steve Woodward (New Zealand)
Player of the match: Allan Lamb (England)

- SL's target was reduced to 267 in 45 overs.

20 October 1987
Scorecard

England; 244/9 (50 overs)	v	Pakistan; 247/3 (49 overs)
Bill Athey 86 (104); Imran Khan 4/37 (9 overs)		Rameez Raja 113 (148); John Emburey 1/34 (10 overs)

Pakistan won by 7 wickets
National Stadium, Karachi, Pakistan
Umpires: Tony Crafter (Australia) and V. K. Ramaswamy (India)
Player of the match: Imran Khan (Pakistan)

26 October 1987
Scorecard

England; 269/5 (50 overs)	v	West Indies; 235 (48.1 overs)
Graham Gooch 92 (137); Patrick Patterson 3/56 (9 overs)		Richie Richardson 93 (130); Phillip DeFreitas 3/28 (9.1 overs)

England won by 34 runs
Sawai Mansingh Stadium, Jaipur, India
Umpires: Mahboob Shah (Pakistan) and PW Vidanagamage (Sri Lanka)
Player of the match: Graham Gooch (England)

30 October 1987
Scorecard

Sri Lanka; 218/7 (50 overs)	v	England; 219/2 (41.2 overs)
Roy Dias 80 (105); Eddie Hemmings 3/57 (10 overs)		Graham Gooch 61 (79); Sridharan Jeganathan 2/45 (10 overs)

England won by 8 wickets
Nehru Stadium, Poona, India
Umpires: David Archer (West Indies) and Khizer Hayat (Pakistan)
Player of the match: Graham Gooch (England)

Knockout stage
Semi-final 2

5 November 1987
Scorecard

England; 254/6 (50 overs)	v	India; 219 (45.3 overs)
Graham Gooch 115 (136); Maninder Singh 3/54 (10 overs)		Mohammad Azharuddin 64 (74); Eddie Hemmings 4/52 (9.3 overs)

England won by 35 runs
Wankhede Stadium, Bombay, India
Umpires: Tony Crafter (Aus) and Steve Woodward (NZ)
Player of the match: Graham Gooch (Eng)

- England qualified for the final for second time after 1979.

Final

8 November 1987
Scorecard

Australia; 253/5 (50 overs)	v	England; 246/8 (50 overs)
David Boon 75 (125); Eddie Hemmings 2/48 (10 overs)		Bill Athey 58 (103); Steve Waugh 2/37 (9 overs)

Australia won by 7 runs
Eden Gardens, Calcutta, India
Umpires: Ram Gupta (Ind) and Mahboob Shah (Pak)
Player of the match: David Boon (Aus)

Summary

The 1987 Cricket World Cup was the first tournament not held in England. England matched their previous best performance, by reaching the final before losing to Australia.

In the semi-final, India chose to field first. After reaching 79/2, Graham Gooch (115 from 136 balls) and captain Mike Gatting (56 from 62 balls) shared a partnership of 117 runs in 19 overs. In the end, England reached 254/6 from their 50 overs. In reply, India made a bad start, and were 73/3. The middle order were more fluent, with Mohammed Azharuddin, (64 from 74 balls) top scoring. When Azharuddien was dismissed, India were 204/5 from 41 overs, and required 51 from 9 overs with 5 wickets in hand. However, they collapsed and were all out for 219 in 45.3 overs.

In the final, Australia won the toss and chose to bat. David Boon (75 from 125 balls, 7 fours) top-scored for Australia, Helped by Mike Veletta (45 from 31 balls), Australia scored 65 runs from the last 6 overs of their innings, and posted 253/5 from their 50 overs. England opener Tim Robinson was out lbw for a first ball duck. Bill Athey (58 from 103 balls) top-scored, and England were almost on target. However, when captain Mike Gatting (41 from 45 balls) was out playing an attempted reverse sweep off the occasional off-spin bowling of Allan Border, this ended a growing partnership of 69 runs in 13 overs between him and Bill Athey. Allan Lamb's innings of 45 from 55 balls was insufficient, as the required run-rate for England began to rise, requiring 17 off the last over, and eventually losing by 7 runs.

=== 1992 World Cup ===
Squad

- Graham Gooch (c)
- Ian Botham
- Phillip DeFreitas
- Neil Fairbrother
- Graeme Hick
- Richard Illingworth
- Allan Lamb
- Chris Lewis
- Derek Pringle
- Dermot Reeve
- Gladstone Small
- Robin Smith
- Alec Stewart (wk)
- Phil Tufnell

Results

Round-robin stage									Semifinal	Final	Overall Result
Opposition Result	Opposition Result	Opposition Result	Opposition Result	Opposition Result	Opposition Result	Opposition Result	Opposition Result	Rank	Opposition Result	Opposition Result	Overall Result
India; W by 9 runs	West Indies; W by 6 wickets	Pakistan; No result	Australia; W by 8 wickets	Sri Lanka; W by 106 runs	South Africa; L by 3 wickets	New Zealand; W by 7 wickets	Zimbabwe; L by 9 runs	2	South Africa; W by 19 runs	Pakistan; L by 22 runs	Runners-up

Scorecards

Round-robin stage

22 February 1992
Scorecard

England; 236/9 (50 overs)	v	India; 227 (49.2 overs)
Robin Smith 91 (108); Manoj Prabhakar 2/34 (10 overs)		Ravi Shastri 57 (112); Dermot Reeve 3/38 (6 overs)

England won by 9 runs
WACA Ground, Perth, Australia
Umpires: Dooland Buultjens and Peter McConnell
Player of the match: Ian Botham

27 February 1992
Scorecard

West Indies; 157 (49.2 overs)	v	England; 160/4 (39.5 overs)
Keith Arthurton 54 (101); Chris Lewis 3/30 (8.2 overs)		Graham Gooch 65 (101); Winston Benjamin 2/22 (9.5 overs)

England won by 6 wickets
Melbourne Cricket Ground, Melbourne, Australia
Umpires: Karl Liebenberg and Steve Woodward
Player of the match: Chris Lewis

1 March 1992
Scorecard

Pakistan; 74 (40.2 overs)	v	England; 24/1 (8 overs)
Saleem Malik 17 (20); Derek Pringle 3/8 (8.2 overs)		Ian Botham 6* (22); Wasim Akram 1/7 (3 overs)

No result
Adelaide Oval, Adelaide, Australia
Umpires: Steve Bucknor and Peter McConnell

5 March 1992
Scorecard

Australia; 171 (49 overs)	v	England; 173/2 (40.5 overs)
Tom Moody 51 (88); Ian Botham 4/31 (10 overs)		Graham Gooch 58 (112); Mike Whitney 1/28 (10 overs)

England won by 8 wickets
Sydney Cricket Ground, Sydney, Australia
Umpires: Steve Bucknor and Khizer Hayat
Player of the match: Ian Botham

9 March 1992
Scorecard

England; 280/9 (50 overs)	v	Sri Lanka; 174 (44 overs)
Neil Fairbrother 63 (70); Asanka Gurusinha 2/67 (10 overs)		Arjuna Ranatunga 36 (51); Chris Lewis 4/30 (8 overs)

England won by 106 runs
Eastern Oval, Ballarat, Australia
Umpires: Khizer Hayat and Piloo Reporter
Player of the match: Chris Lewis

12 March 1992
Scorecard

South Africa; 236/4 (50 overs)	v	England; 226/7 (40.5 overs)
Kepler Wessels 85 (126); Graeme Hick 2/44 (8.2 overs)		Alec Stewart 77 (88); Richard Snell 3/42 (7.5 overs)

England won by 3 wickets (revised target)
Melbourne Cricket Ground, Melbourne, Australia
Umpires: Brian Aldridge and Dooland Buultjens
Player of the match: Alec Stewart

- Rain disrupted play in England's innings for 43 minutes when they were 62/0 after 12.0 overs. The target was revised to 226 in 41 overs.

15 March 1992
Scorecard

England; 200/8 (50 overs)	v	New Zealand; 201/3 (40.5 overs)
Graeme Hick 56 (70); Dipak Patel 2/26 (10 overs)		Andrew Jones 78 (113); Ian Botham 1/19 (4 overs)

New Zealand won by 7 wickets
Basin Reserve, Wellington, New Zealand
Umpires: Steve Randell and Ian Robinson
Player of the match: Andrew Jones

18 March 1992
Scorecard

Zimbabwe; 134 (46.1 overs)	v	England; 125 (49.1 overs)
David Houghton 29 (74); Ian Botham 3/23 (10 overs)		Alec Stewart 29 (96); Eddo Brandes 4/21 (10 overs)

Zimbabwe won by 9 runs
Lavington Sports Oval, Albury, Australia
Umpires: Brian Aldridge and Khizer Hayat
Player of the match: Eddo Brandes

Knockout stage

Semi-final 2
22 March 1992
scorecard

England; 252/6 (45 overs)	v	South Africa; 232/6 (43 overs)
Graeme Hick 83 (90 balls); Meyrick Pringle 2/36 (9 overs)		Andrew Hudson 46 (52 balls); Richard Illingworth 2/46 (10 overs)

England won by 20 runs (revised target)
Sydney Cricket Ground, Sydney, Australia
Attendance: 35,010
Umpires: Brian Aldridge and Steve Randell
Player of the match: Graeme Hick

- Rain interrupted play before the last ball of the 43rd over. South Africa then required 22 runs off 13 balls for victory. With 2 overs lost due to rain, the target was reduced to 22 runs from only 1 ball.

Final
25 March 1992
scorecard

Pakistan; 249/6 (50 overs)	v	England; 227 (49.2 overs)
Imran Khan 72 (110 balls); Derek Pringle 3/22 (10 overs)		Neil Fairbrother 62 (70 balls); Mushtaq Ahmed 3/41 (10 overs)

Pakistan won by 22 runs
Melbourne Cricket Ground, Melbourne, Australia
Umpires: Brian Aldridge and Steve Bucknor
Player of the match: Wasim Akram

Summary

England reached their third World Cup final, and again lost in the final, this time to Pakistan. England won 5 of their 8 pool stage matches, with 1 no result, and easily qualified for the semi-final, despite a surprising lost to Zimbabwe in their final group match. Their semi-final was memorable due to a target recalculation under the most productive overs rule which removed any chance for South Africa to win the match. Despite being favourites to win the final, England lost to Pakistan, their third World Cup Final defeat.

The semi final between South Africa and England ended in controversial circumstances when, after a 10-minute rain delay, the most productive overs method revised South Africa's target from 22 runs from 13 balls to an impossible 21 runs from one ball. After the World Cup, ODIs used a different formula as a result of this incident, and it was eventually superseded by the Duckworth–Lewis method for the 1999 World Cup. According to the late Bill Frindall, had the Duckworth–Lewis method been applied at that rain interruption, the revised target would have been four runs to tie or five to win from the final ball.

England were favourites to win, having bowled out Pakistan for just 74 earlier in the tournament. A repeat looked possible when Derek Pringle dismissed both Pakistani openers, making the score 24/2. However, Imran Khan and Javed Miandad settled down to see off the new ball. A crucial moment occurred when Imran Khan was dropped by Graham Gooch at 9 runs. He later went on to score a match-winning 72. At the 25 over mark, Pakistan had only scored 70, but accelerated the score to 139 by the 31st over as Javed Miandad summoned a runner and Imran and him built a steady partnership. During his innings, Imran Khan hit a huge six off Richard Illingworth that landed far back into the members' section. Imran went on to score 72 and Miandad 58 to steady the innings, expectedly followed by an onslaught from Inzamam (42) and Wasim Akram (33) enabling Pakistan to give England a fighting target of 250. England's start was shaky. Ian Botham was dismissed for a duck by Wasim Akram, followed by Stewart, Hick and Gooch, which left England tumbling at 69/4. A solid partnership of 71 between Allan Lamb and Neil Fairbrother left Imran with no choice but to give an early second spell to his main pacer Wasim Akram in the 35th over. The decision wrote the fate of the match. Two magical deliveries from the great left-arm fast bowler showed Allan Lamb and the dangerous Chris Lewis the pavilion door. Soon Fairbrother was caught by Moin Khan off Aaqib Javed to seal England's last hope. When the cards were laid down, Captain Imran Khan had the last laugh when end man Richard Illingworth was caught by Ramiz Raja off his delivery to finish off the final and crown Pakistan World Cup winners.

=== 1996 World Cup ===
Squad

- Michael Atherton (c)
- Dominic Cork
- Phillip DeFreitas
- Neil Fairbrother
- Darren Gough
- Graeme Hick
- Peter Martin
- Richard Illingworth
- Jack Russell (wk)
- Neil Smith
- Robin Smith
- Alec Stewart
- Graham Thorpe
- Craig White
- Dermot Reeve

Results

Group stage						Quarterfinal	Semifinal	Final	Overall Result
Opposition Result	Opposition Result	Opposition Result	Opposition Result	Opposition Result	Rank	Opposition Result	Opposition Result	Opposition Result	Overall Result
New Zealand; L by 11 runs	United Arab Emirates; W by 8 wickets	Netherlands; W by 49 runs	South Africa; L by 78 runs	Pakistan; L by 7 wickets	4	Sri Lanka; L by 5 wickets	Did not advance		Quarter-finals

Scorecards

Group stage (Group B)

14 February
Scorecard

New Zealand; 239/6 (50 overs)	v	England; 228/9 (50 overs)
Nathan Astle 101 (132); Graeme Hick 2/45 (9 overs)		Graeme Hick 85 (102); Dion Nash 3/26 (7 overs)

New Zealand won by 11 runs
Gujarat Stadium, Motera, Ahmedabad
Umpires: B.C. Cooray and Steve Randell
Player of the match: Nathan Astle (NZ)

18 February
Scorecard

United Arab Emirates; 136 (48.3 overs)	v	England; 140/2 (35 overs)
Mazhar Hussain 33 (59); Neil Smith 3/29		Graham Thorpe 44* (66); Arshad Laeeq 1/25 (7 overs)

England won by 8 wickets
Arbab Niaz Stadium, Peshawar
Umpires: B.C. Cooray and V.K. Ramaswamy
Player of the match: Neil Smith (Eng)

22 February
Scorecard

England; 279/4 (50 overs)	v	Netherlands; 230/6 (50 overs)
Graeme Hick 104* (133); Roland Lefebvre 1/40 (10 overs)		Klaas van Noortwijk 64 (82); Phil DeFreitas 3/31 (10 overs)

England won by 49 runs
Arbab Niaz Stadium, Peshawar
Umpires: Steve Bucknor and K.T. Francis
Player of the match: Graeme Hick (Eng)

25 February
Scorecard

South Africa; 230 all out (50 overs)	v	England; 152 all out (44.3 overs)
Gary Kirsten 38 (60); Peter Martin 3/33 (10 overs)		Graham Thorpe 46 (69); Shaun Pollock 2/16 (8 overs)

South Africa won by 78 runs
Rawalpindi Cricket Stadium, Rawalpindi
Umpires: Steve Randell and Ian Robinson
Player of the match: Jonty Rhodes (SA)

3 March
Scorecard

England; 249/9 (50 overs)	v	Pakistan; 250/3 (47.4 overs)
Robin Smith 75 (92); Mushtaq Ahmed 3/53 (10 overs)		Saeed Anwar 71 (72); Dominic Cork 2/59 (10 overs)

Pakistan won by 7 wickets
National Stadium, Karachi
Umpires: B.C. Cooray and Srinivas Venkataraghavan
Player of the match: Aamer Sohail (Pak)

Knockout stage

Quarter-final 1
9 March
Scorecard

England; 235/8 (50 overs)	v	Sri Lanka; 236/5 (40.4 overs)
Phil DeFreitas 67 (64); Kumar Dharmasena 2/30 (10 overs)		Sanath Jayasuriya 82 (44); Dermot Reeve 1/14 (4 overs)

Sri Lanka won by 5 wickets
Iqbal Stadium, Faisalabad
Attendance: 25,000
Umpires: Mahboob Shah and Ian Robinson
Player of the match: Sanath Jayasuriya (SL)

=== 1999 World Cup ===
Squad

- Alec Stewart (c/wk)
- Ian Austin
- Robert Croft
- Mark Ealham
- Neil Fairbrother
- Andrew Flintoff
- Angus Fraser
- Darren Gough
- Graeme Hick
- Adam Hollioake
- Nasser Hussain
- Nick Knight
- Alan Mullally
- Graham Thorpe
- Vince Wells

Results

Pool stage						Super Six		Semifinal	Final	Overall Result
Opposition Result	Opposition Result	Opposition Result	Opposition Result	Opposition Result	Rank	Opposition Result	Rank	Opposition Result	Opposition Result	Overall Result
Sri Lanka; W by 8 wickets	Kenya; W by 9 wickets	South Africa; L by 122 runs	Zimbabwe; W by 7 wickets	India; L by 63 runs	4	Did not advance				Pool stage

Scorecards

Pool stage (Pool A)

14 May 1999
Scorecard

Sri Lanka; 204 (48.4 overs)	v	England; 207/2 (46.5 overs)
Romesh Kaluwitharana 57 (66); Alan Mullally 4/37 (10 overs)		Alec Stewart 88 (146); Chaminda Vaas 1/27 (10 overs)

England won by 8 wickets
Lord's, London, England
Umpires: Rudi Koertzen (SA) and Srinivasaraghavan Venkataraghavan (Ind)
Player of the match: Alec Stewart (Eng)

18 May 1999
Scorecard

Kenya; 203 (49.4 overs)	v	England; 204/1 (39 overs)
Steve Tikolo 71 (141); Darren Gough 4/34 (10 overs)		Nasser Hussain 88* (127); Thomas Odoyo 1/65 (10 overs)

England won by 9 wickets
St Lawrence Ground, Canterbury, England
Umpires: KT Francis (SL) and Rudi Koertzen (SA)
Player of the match: Steve Tikolo (Ken)

22 May 1999
Scorecard

South Africa; 225/7 (50 overs)	v	England; 103 (41 overs)
Herschelle Gibbs 60 (99); Alan Mullally 2/28 (10 overs)		Neil Fairbrother 21 (44); Steve Elworthy 2/24 (10 overs)

South Africa won by 122 runs
The Oval, London, England
Umpires: Steve Dunne (NZ) and Srinivasaraghavan Venkataraghavan (Ind)
Player of the match: Lance Klusener (SA)

25 May 1999
Scorecard

Zimbabwe; 167/8 (50 overs)	v	England; 168/3 (38.3 overs)
Grant Flower 35 (90); Alan Mullally 2/16 (10 overs)		Graham Thorpe 62 (80); Mpumelelo Mbangwa 2/28 (7 overs)

England won by 7 wickets
Trent Bridge, Nottingham, England
Umpires: Steve Bucknor (WI) and Darrell Hair (Aus)
Player of the match: Alan Mullally (Eng)

29–30 May 1999
Scorecard

India; 232/8 (50 overs)	v	England; 169 (45.2 overs)
Rahul Dravid 53 (82); Mark Ealham 2/28 (10 overs)		Graham Thorpe 36 (57); Sourav Ganguly 3/27 (8 overs)

India won by 63 runs
Edgbaston, Birmingham, England
Umpires: Darrell Hair (Aus) and Javed Akhtar (Pak)
Player of the match: Sourav Ganguly (Ind)

Summary

England hosted the 1999 Cricket World Cup, although some matches were played in Scotland, Ireland and the Netherlands. After defeats to South Africa and India, England failed to progress to the Knockout stage of the tournament, for the first time in the tournament history.

=== 2003 World Cup ===
Squad

- Nasser Hussain (c)
- James Anderson
- Ian Blackwell
- Andy Caddick
- Paul Collingwood
- Andrew Flintoff
- Ashley Giles
- Steve Harmison
- Matthew Hoggard
- Ronnie Irani
- Nick Knight
- Alec Stewart (wk)
- Marcus Trescothick
- Michael Vaughan
- Craig White

Results

Pool stage							Super Six		Semifinal	Final	Overall Result
Opposition Result	Opposition Result	Opposition Result	Opposition Result	Opposition Result	Opposition Result	Rank	Opposition Result	Rank	Opposition Result	Opposition Result	Overall Result
Zimbabwe; L by walkover	Netherlands; W by 6 wickets	Namibia; W by 55 runs	Pakistan; W by 112 runs	India; L by 82 runs	Australia; L by 2 wickets	4	Did not advance				Pool stage

Scorecards

Pool stage (Pool A)

13 February 2003
Scorecard

Zimbabwe	v	England

Zimbabwe won (by walkover)
Harare Sports Club, Harare, Zimbabwe
Umpires: Steve Bucknor (WI) and Dave Orchard (SA)

16 February 2003
Scorecard

Netherlands; 142/9 (50 overs)	v	England; 144/4 (23.2 overs)
Tim de Leede 58 (96); James Anderson 4/25 (10 overs)		Michael Vaughan 51 (47); Daan van Bunge 3/16 (3 overs)

England won by 6 wickets.
Buffalo Park, East London, South Africa
Umpires: Darrell Hair and Rudi Koertzen
Player of the match: James Anderson (Eng)

19 February 2003
Scorecard

England; 272 (50 overs)	v	Namibia; 217/9 (50 overs)
Alec Stewart 60 (77); Rudi van Vuuren 5/43 (10 overs)		Jan-Berrie Burger 85 (86); Ronnie Irani 3/30 (8 overs)

England won by 55 runs
St George's Park, Port Elizabeth, South Africa
Umpires: Simon Taufel (Aus) and Srinivas Venkataraghavan (Ind)
Player of the match: Jan-Berrie Burger (Nam)

22 February 2003
Scorecard

England; 246/8 (50 overs)	v	Pakistan; 134 (31 overs)
Paul Collingwood 66 (73); Shahid Afridi 2/36 (8 overs)		Shoaib Akhtar 43 (16); James Anderson 4/29 (10 overs)

England won by 112 runs
Newlands Cricket Ground, Cape Town, South Africa
Umpires: Brian Jerling (SA) and Rudi Koertzen (SA)
Player of the match: James Anderson (Eng)

26 February 2003
Scorecard

India; 250/9 (50 overs)	v	England; 168 (45.3 overs)
Rahul Dravid 62 (72); Andy Caddick 3/69 (10 overs)		Andrew Flintoff 64 (73); Ashish Nehra 6/23 (10 overs)

India won by 82 runs
Kingsmead, Durban, South Africa
Umpires: Rudi Koertzen (SA) and Simon Taufel (Aus)
Player of the match: Ashish Nehra (Ind)

2 March 2003
Scorecard

England; 204/8 (50 overs)	v	Australia; 208/8 (49.4 overs)
Alec Stewart 46 (92); Andy Bichel 7/20 (10 overs)		Michael Bevan 74 (126); Andy Caddick 4/35 (9 overs)

Australia won by 2 wickets
St George's Oval, Port Elizabeth, South Africa
Umpires: Aleem Dar (Pak) and Russell Tiffin (Zim)
Player of the match: Andy Bichel (Aus)

Summary

England forfeited their first match against Zimbabwe due to security concerns in Zimbabwe. Of the remaining 5 games, they won 3, but for the second consecutive World Cup, England failed to progress from the group stage.

=== 2007 World Cup ===
Squad

- Michael Vaughan (c)
- James Anderson
- Ian Bell
- Ravi Bopara
- Paul Collingwood
- Jamie Dalrymple
- Andrew Flintoff
- Ed Joyce
- Jon Lewis
- Sajid Mahmood
- Paul Nixon (wk)
- Monty Panesar
- Kevin Pietersen
- Liam Plunkett
- Andrew Strauss

Note: On 4 April 2007, Lewis was withdrawn from the squad for personal reasons. Stuart Broad replaced him.

Results

Group stage				Super 8							Semifinal	Final	Overall Result
Opposition Result	Opposition Result	Opposition Result	Rank	Opposition Result	Opposition Result	Opposition Result	Opposition Result	Opposition Result	Opposition Result	Rank	Opposition Result	Opposition Result	Overall Result
New Zealand; L by 6 wickets	Canada; W by 51 runs	Kenya; W by 7 wickets	2	Ireland; W by 48 runs	Sri Lanka; L by 2 runs	Australia; L by 7 wickets	Bangladesh; W by 4 wickets	South Africa; L by 9 wickets	West Indies; W by 1 wicket	5	Did not advance		Super 8

Scorecards

Group stage (Group C)

16 March
Scorecard

England; 209/7 (50 overs)	v	New Zealand; 210/4 (41 overs)
Kevin Pietersen 60 (92); Shane Bond 2/19 (10 overs)		Scott Styris 87* (113); James Anderson 2/39 (8 overs)

New Zealand won by 6 wickets
Beausejour Stadium, Gros Islet
Umpires: Billy Doctrove (WI) and Rudi Koertzen (SA)
Player of the match: Scott Styris (NZ)

- New Zealand won the toss and elected to field.

18 March
Scorecard

England; 279/6 (50 overs)	v	Canada; 228/7 (50 overs)
Ed Joyce 66 (103); Sunil Dhaniram 3/41 (10 overs)		Ashif Mulla 58 (60); Ravi Bopara 2/43 (9 overs)

England won by 51 runs
Beausejour Stadium, Gros Islet
Umpires: Billy Doctrove (WI) and Peter Parker (Aus)
Player of the match: Paul Collingwood (Eng)

- Canada won the toss and elected to field.

24 March
Scorecard

Kenya; 177 (43 overs)	v	England; 178/3 (33 overs)
Steve Tikolo 76 (97); James Anderson 2/27 (9 overs)		Ed Joyce 75 (90); Thomas Odoyo 1/27 (6 overs)

England won by 7 wickets
Beausejour Stadium, Gros Islet
Umpires: Rudi Koertzen (SA) and Peter Parker (Aus)
Player of the match: Ed Joyce (Eng)

- Kenya won the toss and elected to bat.

Super 8

30 March 2007
Scorecard

England; 266/7 (50 overs)	v	Ireland; 218 (48.1 overs)
Paul Collingwood 90 (82); Boyd Rankin 2/28 (7 overs)		Niall O'Brien 63 (88); Andrew Flintoff 4/43 (8.1 overs)

England won by 48 runs
Providence Stadium, Guyana
Umpires: Billy Doctrove (WI) and Simon Taufel (Aus)
Player of the match: Paul Collingwood (Eng)

- England won the toss and elected to bat.

4 April 2007
Scorecard

Sri Lanka; 235 (50 overs)	v	England; 233/8 (50 overs)
Upul Tharanga 62 (103); Sajid Mahmood 4/50 (9 overs)		Kevin Pietersen 58 (80); Dilhara Fernando 3/41 (9 overs)

Sri Lanka won by 2 runs
Sir Vivian Richards Stadium, North Sound
Umpires: Asad Rauf (Pak) and Billy Bowden (NZ)
Player of the match: Ravi Bopara (Eng)

- England won the toss and elected to field.

8 April 2007
Scorecard

England; 247 (49.5 overs)	v	Australia; 248/3 (47.2 overs)
Kevin Pietersen 104 (122); Nathan Bracken 3/33 (10 overs)		Ricky Ponting 86 (106); Andrew Flintoff 1/35 (10 overs)

Australia won by 7 wickets
Sir Vivian Richards Stadium, North Sound
Umpires: Billy Bowden (NZ) and Rudi Koertzen (SA)
Player of the match: Shaun Tait (Aus)

- England won the toss and elected to bat.

11 April 2007
Scorecard

Bangladesh; 143 (37.2 overs)	v	England; 147/6 (44.5 overs)
Shakib Al Hasan 57* (95); Monty Panesar 3/25 (7 overs)		Michael Vaughan 30 (59); Syed Rasel 2/25 (10 overs)

England won by 4 wickets
Kensington Oval, Bridgetown
Umpires: Steve Bucknor (WI) and Simon Taufel (Aus)
Player of the match: Sajid Mahmood (Eng)

- England won the toss and elected to field.

17 April 2007
Scorecard

England; 154 (48 overs)	v	South Africa; 157/1 (19.2 overs)
Andrew Strauss 46 (67); Andrew Hall 5/18 (10 overs)		Graeme Smith 89* (58); Andrew Flintoff 1/36 (6 overs)

South Africa won by 9 wickets
Kensington Oval, Bridgetown
Umpires: Steve Bucknor (WI) and Simon Taufel (Aus)
Player of the match: Andrew Hall (SA)

- England won the toss and elected to bat.

21 April 2007
Scorecard

West Indies; 300 (49.5 overs)	v	England; 301/9 (49.5 overs)
Chris Gayle 79 (58); Michael Vaughan 3/39 (10 overs)		Kevin Pietersen 100 (91); Dwayne Bravo 2/47 (9.5 overs)

England won by 1 wicket
Kensington Oval, Bridgetown
Umpires: Rudi Koertzen (SA) and Simon Taufel (Aus)
Player of the match: Kevin Pietersen (Eng)

- England won the toss and elected to field first.

Summary

After failing to progress from the group stage at the 1999 and 2003 World Cups, England managed to progress to the Super 8 stage of the tournament, by winning both their matches against Associate Nations. In the Super 8 stage, they were eliminated, beating Ireland, Bangladesh and West Indies but losing to 4 other Test-playing nations.

In their opening match, England lost Ed Joyce for a duck off the first legitimate delivery of the match, and only Paul Nixon and Liam Plunkett, the numbers eight and nine, managed a strike rate above 70. With the fall of Paul Collingwood at the end of 35th over, New Zealand captain Stephen Fleming brought on Shane Bond, and he removed Kevin Pietersen, England's top-scorer, and Andrew Flintoff in the same over. Jamie Dalrymple followed three overs later, as England had lost four wickets for five runs, but Nixon and Plunkett batted out the remaining 12 overs, making 71. In reply, New Zealand lost two wickets in eight balls to James Anderson and Liam Plunkett, and also had captain Fleming back for a single-figure score. However, from then on they made 191 for the loss of only one wicket, Craig McMillan caught off Monty Panesar's bowling. Scott Styris and Jacob Oram added an unbeaten 138 for the fifth wicket, just ten runs off the New Zealand record from the 1999 World Cup, resulting in a man-of-the-match award for Styris.

Their final match against Kenya was effectively a playoff match against the 2003 semi-finalists. Ed Joyce's second fifty in as many matches helped England qualify for the Super Eights. Steve Tikolo came in at four after James Anderson had removed both openers, and though he made his 20th half-century, none of his team-mates passed 20. Extras were the second-highest contributor, with six wides and eight no-balls, most of the latter coming from Sajid Mahmood and Andrew Flintoff, who bowled three no-balls each. Flintoff did get Tikolo out with a yorker, while three of Kenya's players were run out as they were bowled out on the last ball of the rain-reduced innings. Kenya's opening bowler Peter Ongondo extracted "tennis-ball bounce" to remove Michael Vaughan for one with the 19th ball of the game; however, despite Ian Bell getting caught for 16, England had reduced the equation to 126 off 34.2 overs after Joyce and Bell's partnership. With Kevin Pietersen also getting a fifty, England made it through with ten overs to spare.

In their first Super 8 match, England won the toss and batted first, but lost both openers to Boyd Rankin in six overs, before Ian Bell spent 74 balls making his 31. When Bell got out, the run rate was slightly above 4; in the final 28 overs, it was in excess of 6, with Paul Collingwood making 90, Kevin Pietersen 48 and Andrew Flintoff 43. Kyle McCallan was the most economical bowler for Ireland, and also took the wicket of Pietersen. Chasing 267 in reply, Niall O'Brien's third One-day International fifty and his second of the World Cup helped Ireland to a total of 139 for six in the 37th over, but despite faster than a run a ball scores from Trent Johnston and Andrew White Ireland fell 48 runs short as Andrew Flintoff took the final two wickets, though they exceeded their previous World Cup record total by seven runs.

=== 2011 World Cup ===
Squad

- Andrew Strauss (c)
- James Anderson
- Ian Bell
- Tim Bresnan
- Stuart Broad
- Paul Collingwood
- Eoin Morgan
- Kevin Pietersen
- Matt Prior (wk)
- Ajmal Shahzad
- Graeme Swann
- James Tredwell
- Jonathan Trott
- Luke Wright
- Michael Yardy

Results

Group stage							Quarterfinal	Semifinal	Final	Overall Result
Opposition Result	Opposition Result	Opposition Result	Opposition Result	Opposition Result	Opposition Result	Rank	Opposition Result	Opposition Result	Opposition Result	Overall Result
Netherlands; W by 6 wickets	India; Tied	Ireland; L by 3 wickets	South Africa; W by 6 runs	Bangladesh; L by 2 wickets	West Indies; W by 18 runs	3	Sri Lanka; L by 10 wickets	Did not advance		Quarter-finals

Scorecards

Group stage (Group B)

22 February 2011
14:30 (D/N)
Scorecard

Netherlands; 292/6 (50 overs)	v	England; 296/4 (48.4 overs)
Ryan ten Doeschate 119 (110); Graeme Swann 2/35 (10 overs)		Andrew Strauss 88 (83); Ryan ten Doeschate 2/47 (10 overs)

England won by 6 wickets
Vidarbha Cricket Association Stadium, Jamtha, Nagpur
Umpires: Asad Rauf (Pak) and Bruce Oxenford (Aus)
Player of the match: Ryan ten Doeschate (Ned)

- Netherlands won the toss and elected to bat.

27 February 2011
14:30 (D/N)
Scorecard

India; 338 (49.5 overs)	v	England; 338/8 (50 overs)
Sachin Tendulkar 120 (115); Tim Bresnan 5/48 (10 overs)		Andrew Strauss 158 (145); Zaheer Khan 3/64 (10 overs)

Match tied
M Chinnaswamy Stadium, Bangalore
Umpires: Billy Bowden (NZ) and Marais Erasmus (SA)
Player of the match: Andrew Strauss (Eng)

- India won the toss and elected to bat.

2 March 2011
14:30 (D/N)
Scorecard

England; 327/8 (50 overs)	v	Ireland; 329/7 (49.1 overs)
Jonathan Trott 92 (92); Trent Johnston 2/58 (10 overs)		Kevin O'Brien 113 (63); Graeme Swann 3/47 (10 overs)

Ireland won by 3 wickets
M Chinnaswamy Stadium, Bangalore
Umpires: Aleem Dar (Pak) and Billy Bowden (NZ)
Player of the match: Kevin O'Brien (Ire)

- England won the toss and elected to bat.

6 March 2011
09:30
Scorecard

England; 171 (45.4 overs)	v	South Africa; 165 (47.4 overs)
Ravi Bopara 60 (98); Imran Tahir 4/38 (8.4 overs)		Hashim Amla 42 (51); Stuart Broad 4/15 (6.4 overs)

England won by 6 runs
MA Chidambaram Stadium, Chepauk, Chennai
Umpires: Amiesh Saheba (Ind) and Simon Taufel (Aus)
Player of the match: Ravi Bopara (Eng)

- England won the toss and elected to bat.

11 March 2011
14:30 (D/N)
Scorecard

England; 225 (49.4 overs)	v	Bangladesh; 227/8 (49 overs)
Jonathan Trott 67 (99); Naeem Islam 2/29 (8 overs)		Imrul Kayes 60 (100); Ajmal Shahzad 3/43 (10 overs)

Bangladesh won by 2 wickets
Zahur Ahmed Chowdhury Stadium, Chittagong
Umpires: Daryl Harper (Aus) and Rod Tucker (Aus)
Player of the match: Imrul Kayes (Ban)

- Bangladesh won the toss and elected to field.

17 March 2011
14:30 (D/N)
Scorecard

England; 243 (48.4 overs)	v	West Indies; 225 (44.4 overs)
Jonathan Trott 47 (38); Andre Russell 4/49 (8 overs)		Andre Russell 49 (46); James Tredwell 4/48 (10 overs)

England won by 18 runs
MA Chidambaram Stadium, Chepauk, Chennai
Umpires: Steve Davis (Aus) and Bruce Oxenford (Aus)
Player of the match: James Tredwell (Eng)

- England won the toss and elected to bat.

Knockout stage

Quarter-final 4
26 March 2011
14:30 (D/N)
Scorecard

England; 229/6 (50 overs)	v	Sri Lanka; 231/0 (39.3 overs)
Jonathan Trott 86 (115); Muttiah Muralitharan 2/54 (9 overs)		Tillakaratne Dilshan 108* (115); Luke Wright 0/17 (9 overs)

Sri Lanka won by 10 wickets
R Premadasa Stadium, Colombo
Umpires: Billy Doctrove (WI) and Simon Taufel (Aus)
Player of the match: Tillakaratne Dilshan (SL)

- England won the toss and elected to bat.

Summary

In the group stages, England suffered shock losses to Ireland and Bangladesh. However, a victory against South Africa and a tie against eventual winners India helped England progress to the quarter-finals, where they lost to Sri Lanka.

England's opening match was against the Netherlands. Batting first, the Netherlands scored 292, the second highest score from an Associate nation playing against a Test nation. In reply, England started strongly, reaching 100/0 at a run a ball, before losing Kevin Pietersen. England captain Andrew Strauss fell just short of a century, and all the England top order batsmen scored runs, with Paul Collingwood and Ravi Bopara taking England home with 1.2 overs to spare.

India batted first and opener Sachin Tendulkar scored his 47th ODI century and 5th World Cup century. Support came from Gautam Gambhir and Yuvraj Singh who both made half-centuries. Tim Bresnan took his first five-wicket haul in ODI matches, which included three wickets with four balls in the 49th over. Chasing 339 to win, Andrew Strauss made his highest score in ODI cricket, with 158, before being dismissed by Zaheer Khan. After a collapse from England, Graeme Swann scored one run off the final ball, tying the match.

Against Ireland, England batted first with Jonathan Trott top-scoring, with 92 from 92 balls. England batsmen Kevin Pietersen and Ian Bell also hit half-centuries, with Trott and Bell sharing a 177 run partnership. England finished on 327/8 from their 50 overs, In reply, Ireland lost their captain, William Porterfield in the very first ball, and were struggling at 111/5 after 25 overs. Kevin O'Brien came in with the score at 106/4, and made 113 in just 63 balls, including the fastest century in World Cup history, as Ireland won the match by 3 wickets, with five balls to spare. It was the largest successful run chase in Cricket World Cup history.

Against South Africa, England batted first and lost the wickets of Andrew Strauss and Kevin Pietersen in the first over. Jonathan Trott and Ravi Bopara put on a partnership worth 99 runs, but England finished all out for 171, with four overs still remaining. In reply, South Africa reached 124 with the loss of just three wickets, but then lost the next four wickets inside five overs for three runs. Stuart Broad took the final two wickets, to give England victory by six runs.

Bangladesh's score was at one point 169/8 but tail ender 58 run partnership brought victory for the team. Bangladesh's win in this match was only their second against England in a total of 15 ODIs.

Their final group match was against the West Indies, and England had to win the game to have any realistic chance of going through to the quarter finals. England chose to bat, and started quickly thanks to Jonathan Trott, who scored 47; they were 94/2 from 15 overs. However, they crumbled in the middle overs, and ended up being bowled out for 243. In reply, Chris Gayle started quickly, including 18 off a Chris Tremlett over, before being dismissed in the seventh over. The West Indies were reduced to 150–6, before a seventh-wicket partnership of 72 between Ramnaresh Sarwan and Andre Russell helped the West Indies reach 222–6 at the end of the 42nd over. However Tredwell and Swann took 3 wickets, and Trott ran out Sulieman Benn, as the West Indies were all out for 225.

In the quarter-final, Tillakaratne Dilshan and Upul Tharanga both made centuries as Sri Lanka chased down a target of 230 to win by ten wickets; this run chase set a new record for the highest successful run chase in a ten-wicket victory in ODI history.

=== 2015 World Cup ===
Squad

- Eoin Morgan (c)
- Moeen Ali
- James Anderson
- Gary Ballance
- Ian Bell
- Ravi Bopara
- Stuart Broad
- Jos Buttler (wk)
- Steven Finn
- Alex Hales
- Chris Jordan
- Joe Root
- James Taylor
- James Tredwell
- Chris Woakes

Results

Group stage							Quarterfinal	Semifinal	Final	Overall Result
Opposition Result	Opposition Result	Opposition Result	Opposition Result	Opposition Result	Opposition Result	Rank	Opposition Result	Opposition Result	Opposition Result	Overall Result
Australia; L by 111 runs	New Zealand; L by 8 wickets	Scotland; W by 119 runs	Sri Lanka; L by 9 wickets	Bangladesh; L by 15 runs	Afghanistan; W by 9 wickets (D/L)	5	Did not advance			Group stage

Scorecards

Pool stage (Pool A)

14 February (D/N)
Scorecard

Australia; 342/9 (50 overs)	v	England; 231 (41.5 overs)
Aaron Finch 135 (128); Steven Finn 5/71 (10 overs)		James Taylor 98* (90); Mitchell Marsh 5/33 (9 overs)

Australia won by 111 runs
Melbourne Cricket Ground, Melbourne
Umpires: Aleem Dar (Pak) and Kumar Dharmasena (SL)
Player of the match: Aaron Finch (Aus)

- England won the toss and elected to field.

20 February (D/N)
Scorecard

England; 123 (33.2 overs)	v	New Zealand; 125/2 (12.2 overs)
Joe Root 46 (70); Tim Southee 7/33 (9 overs)		Brendon McCullum 77 (25); Chris Woakes 2/8 (3 overs)

New Zealand won by 8 wickets
Wellington Regional Stadium, Wellington
Umpires: Paul Reiffel (Aus) and Rod Tucker (Aus)
Player of the match: Tim Southee (NZ)

- England won the toss and elected to bat.

23 February
Scorecard

England; 303/8 (50 overs)	v	Scotland; 184 (42.2 overs)
Moeen Ali 128 (107); Josh Davey 4/68 (10 overs)		Kyle Coetzer 71 (84); Steven Finn 3/26 (9 overs)

England won by 119 runs
Hagley Oval, Christchurch
Player of the match: Moeen Ali (Eng)

- Scotland won the toss and elected to field.

1 March
Scorecard

England; 309/6 (50 overs)	v	Sri Lanka; 312/1 (47.2 overs)
Joe Root 121 (108); Tillakaratne Dilshan 1/35 (8.2 overs)		Lahiru Thirimanne 139* (143); Moeen Ali 1/50 (10 overs)

Sri Lanka won by 9 wickets
Wellington Regional Stadium, Wellington
Umpires: Bruce Oxenford (Aus) and Rod Tucker (Aus)
Player of the match: Kumar Sangakkara (SL)

- England won the toss and elected to bat.
- Joe Root became the youngest English player to score a century at a World Cup.
- Sri Lanka became the first team in a World Cup match to chase down a score of more than 300 runs for the loss of only one wicket.

9 March (D/N)
Scorecard

Bangladesh; 275/7 (50 overs)	v	England; 260 (48.3 overs)
Mahmudullah Riyad 103 (138); James Anderson 2/45 (10 overs)		Jos Buttler 65 (52); Rubel Hossain 4/53 (9.3 overs)

Bangladesh won by 15 runs
Adelaide Oval, Adelaide
Umpires: Billy Bowden (NZ) and Paul Reiffel (Aus)
Player of the match: Mahmudullah Riyad (Ban)

- England won the toss and elected to field.
- England was eliminated from the World Cup as a result of this match.

13 March (D/N)
Scorecard

Afghanistan; 111/7 (36.2 overs)	v	England; 101/1 (18.1 overs)
Shafiqullah 30 (64); Chris Jordan 2/13 (6.2 overs)		Ian Bell 52* (56); Hamid Hassan 1/17 (5 overs)

England won by 9 wickets (D/L method)
Sydney Cricket Ground, Sydney
Umpires: Billy Bowden (NZ) and Sundaram Ravi (Ind)
Player of the match: Chris Jordan (Eng)

- England won the toss and elected to field.
- Afghanistan's innings ended in the 37th over and England's target reduced to 101 off 25 overs due to rain.

Summary

England failed to beat any Test-playing nations at the 2015 Cricket World Cup. Although they beat Associate nations Scotland and Afghanistan, this was not enough to qualify for the Knockout stage. This was the third time that they had not progressed from the group stage.

England's fixtures began with 2 games against co-hosts Australia and New Zealand — they lost both. They reduced Australia to 52/2, and 70/3 in the 11th over. Stand-in captain George Bailey and Aaron Finch then put together a 146 run-partnership in 26 overs, and Australia accelerated their scoring rate with Glenn Maxwell, Mitchell Marsh and Brad Haddin. Despite a hat-trick from Steven Finn with the last three balls of the innings, Australia finished at 342/9. In reply, England were reduced to 92/6. Despite a 92-run partnership between James Taylor and Chris Woakes, England found themselves at 195/9. They eventually reached 231, before James Anderson was incorrectly given run out; Taylor finished on 98*, and England lost by 111 runs.

England's next match was against the other co-hosts, New Zealand. After electing to bat first, England were bowled out for 123 in the 34th over, having lost their last seven wickets for 19 runs in eight overs. New Zealand fast bowler Tim Southee picked up 7/33 in his 9 overs, which was the third-best haul in World Cup history. In reply, New Zealand captain Brendon McCullum scored the fastest World Cup fifty reaching the landmark in just 18 balls, and New Zealand were 105/0 after 7 overs. McCullum was dismissed off the first ball of the eighth over for 77, and the other opener, Martin Guptill also fell to the bowling of Chris Woakes in the tenth over. New Zealand consolidated the innings following this and went on to win the game by 8 wickets with more than 37 overs to spare.

After 2 heavy defeats, England looked to bounce back against Scotland, who were the lowest ranked team in the Group, and had never beaten England in an ODI. Batting first, Moeen Ali and Ian Bell put on an opening partnership of 172. However, in the first 3 overs of the batting powerplay England lost 3 wickets for 2 runs, including top-scorer Moeen Ali, and despite a 49 run partnership between Eoin Morgan and James Taylor and a 45 run partnership between Morgan and Jos Buttler, England only reached 309/8, with just 131 runs scored in the last 20 overs. In reply, Scotland started confidently with Kyle Coetzer (71) sharing an early 60 run partnership with Preston Mommsen. However, after Mommsen's dismissal, Scotland continued to lose wickets throughout the innings, including Steven Finn dismissing Coetzer for 71. Eventually, they lost their last 7 wickets for 70 runs, with 6 batsmen scoring fewer than 10 runs, as Scotland were bowled out for 184, and England won by 119 runs.

England's match against Sri Lanka was the chance to get a first win against a Test-playing nation in the tournament. However, from 62/0, their innings was reduced to 101/3 in the 21st over. Joe Root and Morgan added 60 runs for the fourth wicket before the dismissal of Morgan. The fifth-wicket partnership between Root and James Taylor yielded 98 runs in 11 overs. Taylor fell for 25, following which Root was also dismissed for a 108-ball 121. England were 265/6 in the 47th over, before Jos Buttler struck an unbeaten 39 in 19 balls to take the total to 309/6 at the end of 50 overs. Sri Lankan innings began with Lahiru Thirimanne being dropped on 3. His opening partner Tillakaratne Dilshan was out for 44 immediately after their partnership had reached 100 runs. Kumar Sangakkara joined Thirimanne and the left-hand duo punished the England bowlers with each of the batsmen making hundreds. Thirimanne struck a six off the third ball of the 48th over to complete an emphatic 9-wicket victory.

With just 1 win in 4 matches, England entered this match knowing that they had to win in order to avoid being eliminated. After being put into bat, Bangladesh were 8/2, and later 99/4. However, a 141-run partnership between Mahmudullah Riyad and Mushfiqur Rahim (the highest partnership for Bangladesh in a World Cup match) helped Bangladesh reach 275/7, their highest score against England in ODI cricket. Mahmudullah Riyad became the first player to score a century for Bangladesh in a World Cup match. England started well, reaching 97/1, including a 54-run partnership between Ian Bell and Alex Hales. However, England then collapsed to 132/5 10 overs later, with the collapse led by Bangladesh captain Mashrafe Mortaza. When Joe Root was caught behind, England needed 113 to win from 14 overs. Jos Buttler and Chris Woakes put on 75 runs for the seventh wicket, but Buttler fell for 65, and England were ultimately bowled out for 260.

In their last game, England beat Afghanistan in a rain-affected match.

=== 2019 World Cup ===
Squad

- Eoin Morgan (c)
- Moeen Ali
- Jofra Archer
- Jonny Bairstow
- Jos Buttler (wk)
- Tom Curran
- Liam Dawson
- Liam Plunkett
- Adil Rashid
- Joe Root
- Jason Roy
- Ben Stokes
- James Vince
- Chris Woakes
- Mark Wood

Results

League stage										Semifinal	Final	Overall Result
Opposition Result	Opposition Result	Opposition Result	Opposition Result	Opposition Result	Opposition Result	Opposition Result	Opposition Result	Opposition Result	Rank	Opposition Result	Opposition Result	Overall Result
South Africa; W by 104 runs	Pakistan; L by 14 runs	Bangladesh; W by 106 runs	West Indies; W by 8 wickets	Afghanistan; W by 150 runs	Sri Lanka; L by 20 runs	Australia; L by 64 runs	India; W by 31 runs	New Zealand; W by 119 runs	3	Australia; W by 8 wickets	New Zealand; Match & S/O Tied (W by boundary count)	Winners

Scorecards

League stage

30 May 2019
10:30
Scorecard

England; 311/8 (50 overs)	v	South Africa; 207 (39.5 overs)
Ben Stokes 89 (79); Lungi Ngidi 3/66 (10 overs)		Quinton de Kock 68 (74); Jofra Archer 3/27 (7 overs)

England won by 104 runs
The Oval, London
Umpires: Kumar Dharmasena (SL) and Bruce Oxenford (Aus)
Player of the match: Ben Stokes (Eng)

- South Africa won the toss and elected to field.
- Eoin Morgan played in his 200th ODI for England. He also scored his 7,000th run in ODIs.

3 June 2019
10:30
Scorecard

Pakistan; 348/8 (50 overs)	v	England; 334/9 (50 overs)
Mohammad Hafeez 84 (62); Moeen Ali 3/50 (10 overs)		Joe Root 107 (104); Wahab Riaz 3/82 (10 overs)

Pakistan won by 14 runs
Trent Bridge, Nottingham
Umpires: Marais Erasmus (SA) and Sundaram Ravi (Ind)
Player of the match: Mohammad Hafeez (Pak)

- England won the toss and elected to field.
- Jason Roy (Eng) scored his 3,000th run in ODIs.
- This was the first time England had lost a run chase in ODIs played at home since 2015, ending a streak of 16 consecutive wins when batting second.

8 June 2019
10:30
Scorecard

England; 386/6 (50 overs)	v	Bangladesh; 280 (48.5 overs)
Jason Roy 153 (121); Mehedi Hasan 2/67 (10 overs)		Shakib Al Hasan 121 (119); Ben Stokes 3/23 (6 overs)

England won by 106 runs
Sophia Gardens, Cardiff
Umpires: Kumar Dharmasena (SL) and Joel Wilson (WI)
Player of the match: Jason Roy (Eng)

- Bangladesh won the toss and elected to field.
- England became the first team to make seven consecutive scores of 300 or more in ODIs.

14 June 2019
10:30
Scorecard

West Indies; 212 (44.4 overs)	v	England; 213/2 (33.1 overs)
Nicholas Pooran 63 (78); Mark Wood 3/18 (6.4 overs)		Joe Root 100* (94); Shannon Gabriel 2/49 (7 overs)

England won by 8 wickets
Rose Bowl, Southampton
Umpires: Kumar Dharmasena (SL) and Sundaram Ravi (Ind)
Player of the match: Joe Root (Eng)

- England won the toss and elected to field.
- Eoin Morgan played in his 300th international match for England.
- Mark Wood (Eng) took his 50th wicket in ODIs.

18 June 2019
10:30
Scorecard

England; 397/6 (50 overs)	v	Afghanistan; 247/8 (50 overs)
Eoin Morgan 148 (71); Gulbadin Naib 3/68 (10 overs)		Hashmatullah Shahidi 76 (100); Jofra Archer 3/52 (10 overs)

England won by 150 runs
Old Trafford, Manchester
Umpires: Paul Reiffel (Aus) and Joel Wilson (WI)
Player of the match: Eoin Morgan (Eng)

- England won the toss and elected to bat.
- Eoin Morgan scored the fastest century by an England batsman in a World Cup match (57 balls), and he also scored the most sixes in an innings in ODIs (17).
- England scored the most sixes in an innings by a team in ODIs (25), and posted their highest team total in a Cricket World Cup match.

21 June 2019
10:30
Scorecard

Sri Lanka; 232/9 (50 overs)	v	England; 212 (47 overs)
Angelo Mathews 85* (115); Mark Wood 3/40 (8 overs)		Ben Stokes 82* (89); Lasith Malinga 4/43 (10 overs)

Sri Lanka won by 20 runs
Headingley, Leeds
Umpires: Marais Erasmus (SA) and Paul Wilson (Aus)
Player of the match: Lasith Malinga (SL)

- Sri Lanka won the toss and elected to bat.
- Moeen Ali (Eng) played in his 100th ODI.
- Adil Rashid played in his 150th international match for England.
- Joe Root played in his 250th international match for England.
- Eoin Morgan scored his 9,000th international run for England.

25 June 2019
10:30
Scorecard

Australia; 285/7 (50 overs)	v	England; 221 (44.4 overs)
Aaron Finch 100 (116); Chris Woakes 2/46 (10 overs)		Ben Stokes 89 (115); Jason Behrendorff 5/44 (10 overs)

Australia won by 64 runs
Lord's, London
Umpires: Chris Gaffaney (NZ) and Sundaram Ravi (Ind)
Player of the match: Aaron Finch (Aus)

- England won the toss and elected to field.

30 June 2019
10:30
Scorecard

England; 337/7 (50 overs)	v	India; 306/5 (50 overs)
Jonny Bairstow 111 (109); Mohammed Shami 5/69 (10 overs)		Rohit Sharma 102 (109); Liam Plunkett 3/55 (10 overs)

England won by 31 runs
Edgbaston, Birmingham
Umpires: Aleem Dar (Pak) and Kumar Dharmasena (SL)
Player of the match: Jonny Bairstow (Eng)

- England won the toss and elected to bat.
- *This was the 100th ODI played between the two teams.

3 July 2019
10:30
Scorecard

England; 305/8 (50 overs)	v	New Zealand; 186 (45 overs)
Jonny Bairstow 106 (99); James Neesham 2/41 (10 overs)		Tom Latham 57 (65); Mark Wood 3/34 (9 overs)

England won by 119 runs
Riverside Ground, Chester-le-Street
Umpires: Sundaram Ravi (Ind) and Rod Tucker (Aus)
Player of the match: Jonny Bairstow (Eng)

- England won the toss and elected to bat.
- England qualified for the semi-finals for the first time since 1992 as a result of this match.
- This was the first time since 1983 that England had beaten New Zealand in a World Cup match.

Knockout stage

Semi Final
11 July 2019
10:30
Scorecard

Australia; 223 (49 overs)	v	England; 226/2 (32.1 overs)
Steve Smith 85 (119); Chris Woakes 3/20 (8 overs)		Jason Roy 85 (65); Pat Cummins 1/34 (7 overs)

England won by 8 wickets
Edgbaston, Birmingham
Umpires: Kumar Dharmasena (SL) and Marais Erasmus (SA)
Player of the match: Chris Woakes (Eng)

- Australia won the toss and elected to bat.
- Mark Wood (Eng) played in his 50th ODI.
- With the wicket of Jonny Bairstow, Mitchell Starc (Aus) took his 27th wicket of the tournament, surpassing Glenn McGrath's record of 26 he set in 2007.
- England qualified for a World Cup final for the first time since 1992.
- This was the first time since 1992 that England had beaten Australia in a World Cup match.

Final
14 July 2019
10:30
Scorecard

New Zealand; 241/8 (50 overs)	v	England; 241 (50 overs)
Henry Nicholls 55 (77); Chris Woakes 3/37 (9 overs)		Ben Stokes 84 (98); James Neesham 3/43 (7 overs)

England won by super over.
Lord's, London
Umpires: Kumar Dharmasena (SL) and Marais Erasmus (SA)
Player of the match: Ben Stokes (Eng)

- New Zealand won the toss and elected to bat.
- Super Over: England 15/0, New Zealand 15/1.
- As the Super Over was tied, England won on the boundary count back rule (26–17).
- This was the first time that the Super Over had been used to determine the winner of a One Day International and was also the first to finish in a tie.
- England became the third consecutive host nation to win the Cricket World Cup.

Summary

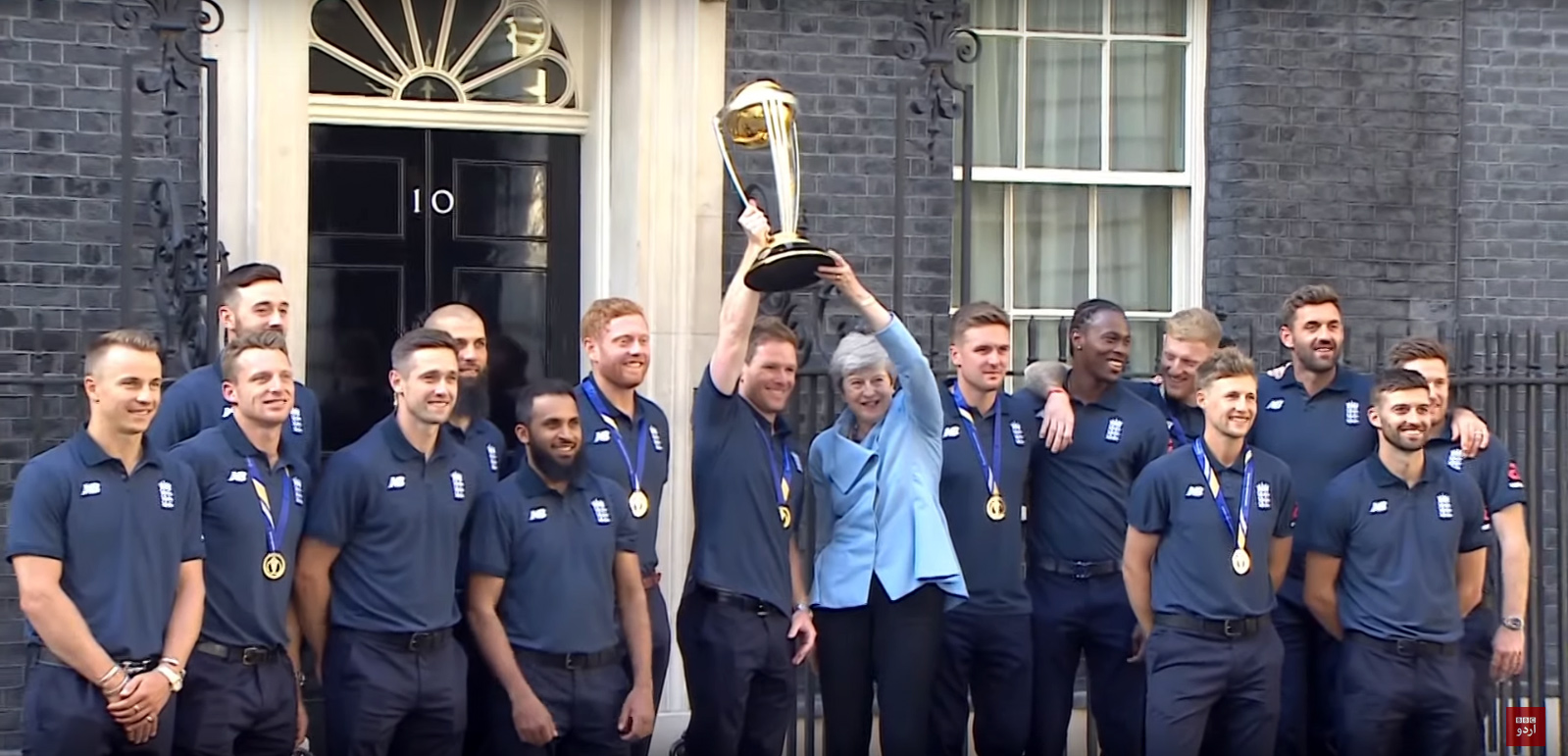
Prime Minister Theresa May with the English Cricket World Cup winning squad.

England and Wales hosted the 2019 edition of the World Cup, making it the fifth time the tournament has been held within the country. England entered the tournament as favourites, having been ranked the number one ODI side by the ICC for over a year prior to the tournament.

England began their campaign on 30 May in the opening match of the tournament against South Africa at The Oval. England batted first and, despite losing opener Jonny Bairstow for a golden duck to the second ball of the tournament, went on to score 311/8, with Ben Stokes top-scoring with 89 runs. In reply, South Africa were bowled out for 207, which included a collapse of eight wickets for 78 runs, to give England victory by 104 runs.

The next match saw the hosts suffer a shock defeat to Pakistan at Trent Bridge. After England won the toss and elected to field, Pakistan scored 348/8, with Mohammad Hafeez making 84. England managed a score of 334/9, losing by 14 runs despite centuries from both Joe Root (107) and Jos Buttler (103) with a substantial 130-run partnership for the fourth wicket.

Against Bangladesh at Sophia Gardens, England were put in to bat and made a total of 386/6, Jason Roy scoring 153 from 121 deliveries. Bangladesh were subsequently all out for 280 after Shakib Al Hasan scored 121, England winning by 106 runs.

England next travelled to Hampshire to face the West Indies at the Hampshire Bowl. England were able to restrict the West Indies to 212 after winning the toss and choosing to field, with Mark Wood taking figures of 3/18. An unbeaten hundred from Joe Root took England to a comfortable eight-wicket win with over 16 overs remaining.

Against Afghanistan at Old Trafford, England set a target of 397/6, their highest ever World Cup total. Eoin Morgan scored 148 runs from 78 balls, including 17 sixes, a record for an individual innings in an ODI. England also surpassed their own record for the most sixes by a team in an ODI, with 25. In Afghanistan's innings, they could only manage 247/8, handing England a comfortable victory by 150 runs.

Bowling first in their next match against Sri Lanka at Headingley, England required a total of 233 runs to win after Sri Lanka finished their innings with 232/9, Angelo Mathews scoring an unbeaten 85. However, England struggled against Lasith Malinga as they were bowled out for 212 in reply, Malinga taking 4/43 as England suffered another shock defeat by 20 runs. Ben Stokes provided England with some hope of a victory, finishing on 82 not out.

=== 2023 World Cup ===
Squad

- Jos Buttler (c, wk)
- Moeen Ali (vc)
- Gus Atkinson
- Jonny Bairstow
- Brydon Carse
- Sam Curran
- Liam Livingstone
- Dawid Malan
- Adil Rashid
- Joe Root
- Ben Stokes
- Reece Topley
- David Willey
- Mark Wood
- Chris Woakes
- Harry Brook

Results

League stage										Semifinal	Final	Overall Result
Opposition Result	Opposition Result	Opposition Result	Opposition Result	Opposition Result	Opposition Result	Opposition Result	Opposition Result	Opposition Result	Rank	Opposition Result	Opposition Result	Overall Result
New Zealand; L by 9 wickets	Bangladesh; W by 137 runs	Afghanistan; L by 69 runs	South Africa; L by 229 runs	Sri Lanka; L by 8 wickets	India; L by 100 runs	Australia; L by 33 runs	Netherlands; W by 160 runs	Pakistan; W by 93 runs	7	Did not advance		League stage

Scorecards

League stage

5 October 2023
14:00 (D/N)
Scorecard

England; 282/9 (50 overs)	v	New Zealand; 283/1 (36.2 overs)
Joe Root 77 (86); Matt Henry 3/48 (10 overs)		Devon Conway 152* (121); Sam Curran 1/47 (6 overs)

New Zealand won by 9 wickets
Narendra Modi Stadium, Ahmedabad
Umpires: Kumar Dharmasena (SL) and Nitin Menon (Ind)
Player of the match: Rachin Ravindra (NZ)

- New Zealand won the toss and elected to field.
- All of England's eleven batsmen reached double figures, the first such instance in ODIs.

10 October 2023
10:30
Scorecard

England; 364/9 (50 overs)	v	Bangladesh; 227 (48.2 overs)
Dawid Malan 140 (107); Mahedi Hasan 4/71 (8 overs)		Liton Das 76 (66); Reece Topley 4/43 (10 overs)

England won by 137 runs
Himachal Pradesh Cricket Association Stadium, Dharamshala
Umpires: Ahsan Raza (Pak) and Paul Wilson (Aus)
Player of the match: Dawid Malan (Eng)

- Bangladesh won the toss and elected to field.
- Jonny Bairstow (Eng) played in his 100th ODI.
- Joe Root became England's highest run-scorer in World Cups, surpassing Graham Gooch (897 runs).

15 October 2023
14:00 (D/N)
Scorecard

Afghanistan; 284 (49.5 overs)	v	England; 215 (40.3 overs)
Rahmanullah Gurbaz 80 (57); Adil Rashid 3/42 (10 overs)		Harry Brook 66 (61); Rashid Khan 3/37 (9.3 overs)

Afghanistan won by 69 runs
Arun Jaitley Cricket Stadium, Delhi
Umpires: Sharfuddoula (Ban) and Rod Tucker (Aus)
Player of the match: Mujeeb Ur Rahman (Afg)

- England won the toss and elected to field.

21 October 2023
14:00 (D/N)
Scorecard

South Africa; 399/7 (50 overs)	v	England; 170 (22 overs)
Heinrich Klaasen 109 (67); Reece Topley 3/88 (8.5 overs)		Mark Wood 43* (17); Gerald Coetzee 3/35 (4 overs)

South Africa won by 229 runs
Wankhede Stadium, Mumbai
Umpires: Kumar Dharmasena (SL) and Nitin Menon (Ind)
Player of the match: Heinrich Klaasen (SA)

- England won the toss and elected to field.

26 October 2023
14:00 (D/N)
Scorecard

England; 156 (33.2 overs)	v	Sri Lanka; 160/2 (25.4 overs)
Ben Stokes 43 (73); Lahiru Kumara 3/35 (7 overs)		Pathum Nissanka 77* (83); David Willey 2/30 (5 overs)

Sri Lanka won by 8 wickets
M. Chinnaswamy Stadium, Bengaluru
Umpires: Chris Brown (NZ) and Adrian Holdstock (SA)
Player of the match: Lahiru Kumara (SL)

- England won the toss and elected to bat.

29 October 2023
14:00 (D/N)
Scorecard

India; 229/9 (50 overs)	v	England; 129 (34.5 overs)
Rohit Sharma 87 (101); David Willey 3/45 (10 overs)		Liam Livingstone 27 (46); Mohammed Shami 4/22 (7 overs)

India won by 100 runs
Ekana Cricket Stadium, Lucknow
Umpires: Adrian Holdstock (SA) and Rod Tucker (Aus)
Player of the match: Rohit Sharma (Ind)

- England won the toss and elected to field.

4 November 2023
14:00 (D/N)
Scorecard

Australia; 286 (49.3 overs)	v	England; 253 (48.1 overs)
Marnus Labuschagne 71 (83); Chris Woakes 4/54 (9.3 overs)		Ben Stokes 64 (90); Adam Zampa 3/21 (10 overs)

Australia won by 33 runs
Narendra Modi Stadium, Ahmedabad
Umpires: Marais Erasmus (SA) and Chris Gaffaney (NZ)
Player of the match: Adam Zampa (Aus)

- England won the toss and elected to field.
- England were eliminated as a result of this match.

8 November 2023
14:00 (D/N)
Scorecard

England; 339/9 (50 overs)	v	Netherlands; 179 (37.2 overs)
Ben Stokes 108 (84); Bas de Leede 3/74 (10 overs)		Teja Nidamanuru 41* (34); Moeen Ali 3/42 (8.2 overs)

England won by 160 runs
Maharashtra Cricket Association Stadium, Pune
Umpires: Ahsan Raza (Pak) and Rod Tucker (Aus)
Player of the match: Ben Stokes (Eng)

- England won the toss and elected to bat.

11 November 2023
14:00 (D/N)
Scorecard

England; 337/9 (50 overs)	v	Pakistan; 244 (43.3 overs)
Ben Stokes 84 (76); Haris Rauf 3/64 (10 overs)		Salman Ali Agha 51 (45); David Willey 3/56 (10 overs)

England won by 93 runs
Eden Gardens, Kolkata
Umpires: Rod Tucker (Aus) and Paul Wilson (Aus)
Player of the match: David Willey (Eng)

- England won the toss and elected to bat.
- David Willey (Eng) took his 100th wicket in ODIs. He also played last game in international cricket.
- Moeen Ali and Dawid Malan (Eng) both played their last ODI.

Summary

England went into the tournament as defending champions after beating New Zealand in the Final 4 years previous. This time around they endured a disastrous tournament which saw them finish 7th in a 10-team table, only just securing a place at the 2025 Champions Trophy by winning their final 2 group games against Netherlands and Pakistan to finish inside the top 8. Moeen Ali and Dawid Malan both played their last ODI for England.

== England World Cup statistics ==
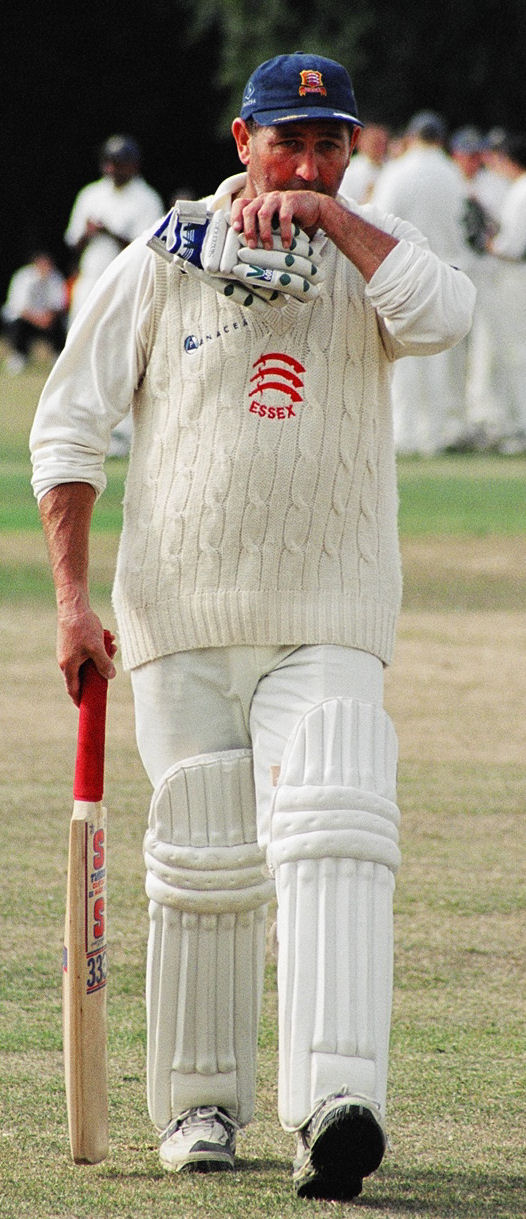
Graham Gooch played in all three of England's Cricket World Cup final defeats, captaining the team in 1992.

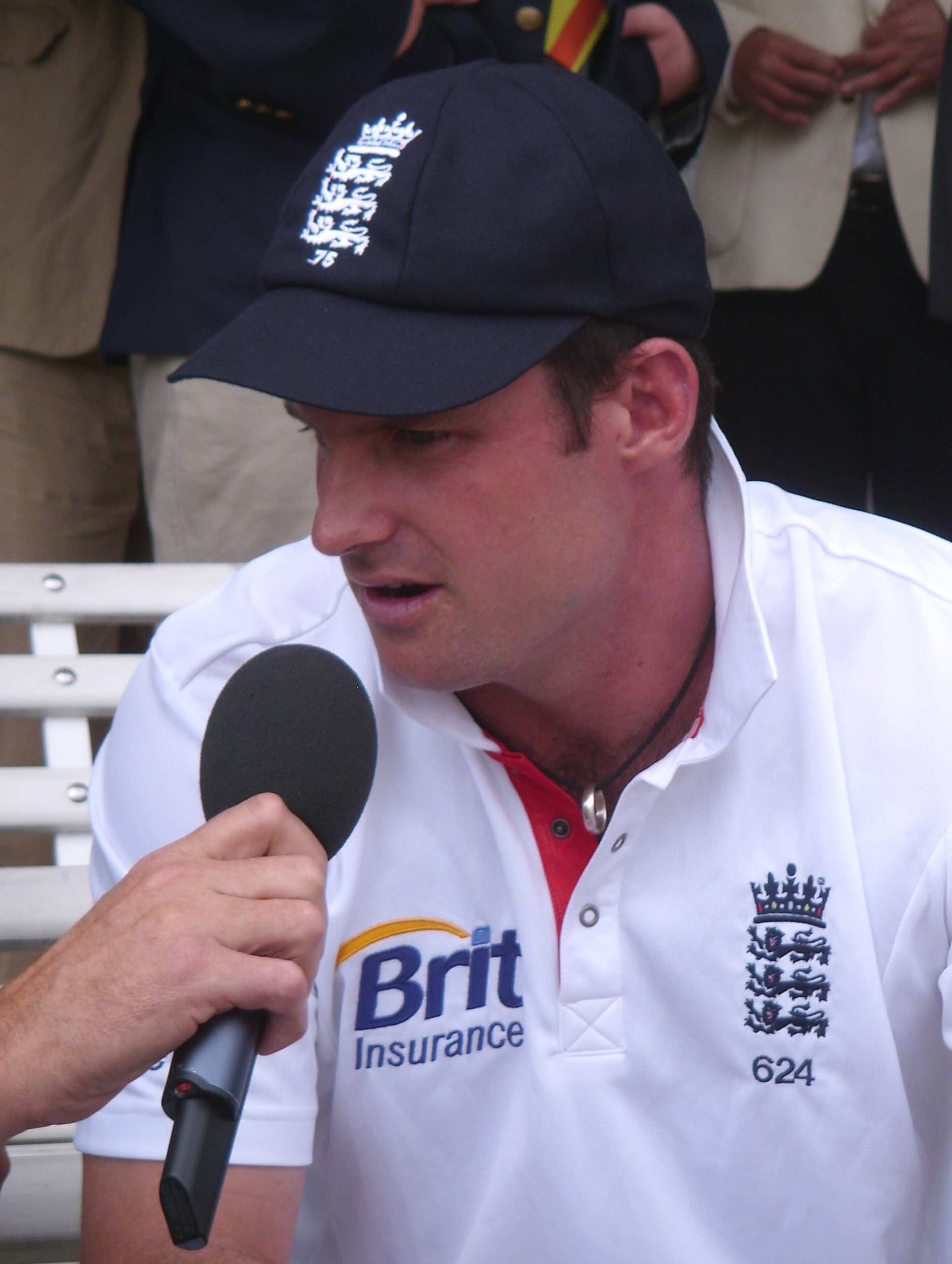
Andrew Strauss' score of 158 in the 2011 Cricket World Cup is the highest score by any England batsman at a World Cup.

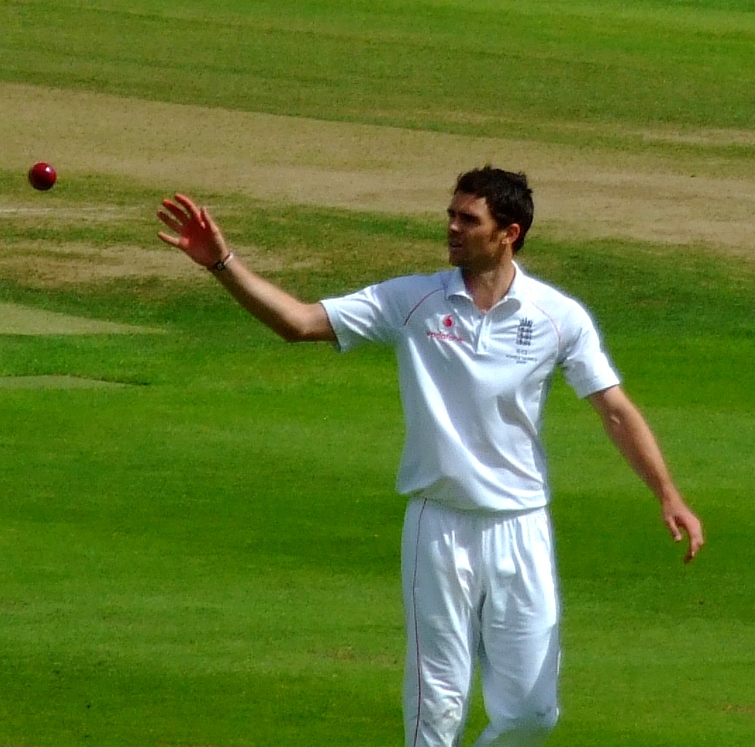
James Anderson hold the record for most England World Cup appearances, joint with Alec Stewart. Both have played in 25 matches.

=== World Cup record (by opponent) ===
Cricket World Cup results (by opponent)
Opponent	Total	Wins	Draws (Note: Draws include tied matches and no results.)	Losses
Afghanistan	3	2	0	1
Australia	10	3	0	7
Bangladesh	5	3	0	2
Canada	2	2	0	0
East Africa	1	1	0	0
India	9	4	1	4
Ireland	2	1	0	1
Kenya	2	2	0	0
Namibia	1	1	0	0
Netherlands	4	4	0	0
New Zealand	11	4	1	6
Pakistan	11	5	1	5
Scotland	1	1	0	0
South Africa	8	4	0	4
Sri Lanka	12	6	0	6
United Arab Emirates	1	1	0	0
West Indies	7	6	0	1
Zimbabwe	3	1	0	2 (Note: Includes forfeited match against Zimbabwe)
Total	84	48	3	33
Source: Last Updated: 11 November 2023

=== Highest innings totals ===
Score	Opponent	Venue	Year
397/6 (50 overs)	v Afghanistan	Old Trafford	2019
364/9 (50 overs)	v Bangladesh	Dharamsala	2023
386/6 (50 overs)	v Bangladesh	Sophia Gardens	2019
339/9 (50 overs)	v Netherlands	Pune	2023
338/8 (50 overs)	v India	Bangalore	2011
Source: Updated: 9 November 2023

=== Lowest completed innings ===
Score	Opponent	Venue	Year
93 (36.2 overs)	v Australia	Leeds	1975
103 (41 overs)	v South Africa	The Oval	1999
123 (33.2 overs)	v New Zealand	Wellington	2015
129 (34.5 overs)	v India	Lucknow	2023
152 (44.3 overs)	v South Africa	Rawalpindi	1996
Source:(unfinished innings excluded from this list) Updated: 7 November 2023

=== Highest individual innings ===
Player	Score	Opponent	Venue	Year
Andrew Strauss	158	India	Bangalore	2011
Jason Roy	153	Bangladesh	Sophia Gardens	2019
Eoin Morgan	148	Afghanistan	Old Trafford	2019
Dawid Malan	140	Bangladesh	Dharamsala	2023
Dennis Amiss	137	India	Lord's	1975
Source: Updated: 7 November 2023

=== Best bowling figures ===
Bowling figures	Player	Opponent	Venue	Year
5/39 (12 overs)	Vic Marks	v Sri Lanka	Taunton	1983
5/48 (10 overs)	Tim Bresnan	v India	Bangalore	2011
5/71 (10 overs)	Steven Finn	v Australia	MCG	2015
5/80 (10 overs)	Chris Old	v Canada	Manchester	1979
4/11 (12 overs)	John Snow	v East Africa	Birmingham	1975
Source: Updated: 19 June 2019

=== Most matches ===
Number of matches	Player	Years spanned
26	Jos Buttler	2015–2023
26	Joe Root	2015–2023
25	James Anderson	2003–2015
25	Alec Stewart	1992–2003
24	Chris Woakes	2015–2023
Source: Updated: 11 November 2023

== See also ==
- England national cricket team
- Cricket in England
