= 1983 Cricket World Cup officials =

List of umpires in the 1983 Cricket World Cup

The 1983 Cricket World Cup was played in England in fifteen venues. A total of 27 matches were played in 1983 Cricket World Cup including 2 Semifinals and a Final match.

== Umpires ==
11 umpires were selected to supervise 27 matches of the World Cup. All of them belonged to the England. The first semifinal was supervised by Don Oslear and David Evans while David Constant and Alan Whitehead supervised the second semifinal.

Dickie Bird was elected for the third time and Barrie Meyer for the second time to supervise a World Cup final.

S.No.	Umpire	Country	Matches
1	Ken Palmer	England	8
2	Alan Whitehead	England	5
3	Barrie Meyer	England	5
4	David Constant	England	5
5	David Evans	England	5
6	Dickie Bird	England	5
7	Don Oslear	England	5
8	Barrie Leadbeater	England	4
9	David Shepherd	England	4
10	Jack Birkenshaw	England	4
11	Mervyn Kitchen	England	4
