= 1983 Cricket World Cup =

International sports tournament

Prudential Cup '83
- Dates: 9 – 25 June 1983
- Administrator: International Cricket Conference
- Cricket format: One Day International
- Tournament format(s): Double round robin and Knockout
- Hosts: England; Wales
- Champions: India (1st title)
- Runners-up: West Indies
- Participants: 8
- Matches: 27
- Attendance: 231,081 (8,559 per match)
- Most runs: (England) David Gower (334)
- Most wickets: (India) Roger Binny (18)

The 1983 Cricket World Cup (officially the Prudential Cup '83) was the third edition of the Cricket World Cup tournament. It was held from 9 to 25 June 1983 in England and Wales and was won by India. Eight countries participated in the event. England, India, Pakistan and West Indies qualified for the semi-finals. The preliminary matches were played in two groups of four teams each, and each country played the others in its group twice. The top two teams in each group qualified for the semi-finals.

The matches consisted of 60 overs per innings and were played in traditional white clothing and with red balls. They were all played during the day.

== Format ==
The eight teams at the tournament were divided into two groups of four, and each team would play the others in their group twice. The top two teams from each group then advanced to the semi-finals, which were played as a single-elimination tournament. Every game was 60 overs a team, and there were no day/night matches.

== Participants ==
Highlighted are the countries to participate in the 1983 Cricket World Cup. Qualified as full member of ICC Qualified via 1982 ICC Trophy Failed to qualify

Eight teams qualified for the final tournament (seven full ICC members, including recently appointed full member Sri Lanka, and Zimbabwe, who qualified by winning the 1982 ICC Trophy).

Team	Method of qualification	Finals appearances	Last appearance	Previous best performance
England	Hosts	3rd	1979	Runners-up (1979)
India	Full member	3rd	1979	Group stage (1975, 1979)
Australia	Full member	3rd	1979	Runners-up (1975)
Pakistan	Full member	3rd	1979	Semi-final (1979)
West Indies	Full member	3rd	1979	Winner (1975, 1979)
New Zealand	Full member	3rd	1979	Semi-finals (1975, 1979)
Sri Lanka	Full member	3rd	1979	Group stage (1975, 1979)
Zimbabwe	1982 ICC Trophy	1st	—	Debut

== Venues ==
1983 Cricket World Cup (England)

Venue	City	Capacity	Matches
Lord's Cricket Ground	London	30,000	3
Trent Bridge	Nottingham	15,350	3
Headingley	Leeds	14,000	3
The Oval	London	23,500	3
Edgbaston Cricket Ground	Birmingham	21,000	3
County Cricket Ground	Derby	9,500	1
County Cricket Ground	Bristol	16,000	1
County Ground	Taunton	6,500	1
County Cricket Ground	Chelmsford	6,500	1
St. Helen's Rugby and Cricket Ground	Swansea, Wales	4,500	1
Grace Road	Leicester	12,000	1
Old Trafford Cricket Ground	Manchester	19,000	3
County Cricket Ground	Southampton	7,000	1
New Road	Worcester	4,500	1
Nevill Ground	Royal Tunbridge Wells	6,000	1

== Group stage ==
Unlike in previous Cricket World Cups, the group stages were played in a double round robin format. Group A comprised the hosts England, Pakistan, New Zealand and Sri Lanka; while Group B contained reigning champions West Indies, India, Australia, and the sole qualifier Zimbabwe. Unlike in later World Cups, with formats designed such that all games could be screened live on television, matches took place simultaneously at multiple venues, with matches played every other day and a reserve day in case of rain, although only three of the matches required a second day.

In Group A, England started strongly with a 106 run victory over New Zealand at The Oval, scoring an imposing 322/6 in their innings, driven by a partnership of 115 in 16 overs between Allan Lamb and Mike Gatting. Pakistan also started with a win, by 50 runs over Sri Lanka, despite being hampered throughout the tournament by Imran Khan being unfit to bowl, after scoring 338/5 in 60 overs. England's second group match brought a second win, as David Gower's 130, including five sixes and 12 fours, powered a 47 run win over Sri Lanka. Meanwhile, New Zealand beat Pakistan by 52 runs despite Abdul Qadir's 4/21 in 12 overs. England then beat Pakistan by 8 wickets with nearly ten overs to spare at Lord's, while Richard Hadlee's 5/25 saw Sri Lanka bowled out for 206, New Zealand getting home with over 20 overs to spare. England's only defeat of the group stages came in the fourth round of matches, against New Zealand, off the penultimate ball of the New Zealand innings. Pakistan triumphed over Sri Lanka, once again led by Abdul Qadir (5/44).

The fifth round of matches on 18 June saw England seal their place in the semi-final, with a first wicket partnership of 115 between Graeme Fowler and Chris Tavaré alone scoring nearly half of Pakistan's 232. Meanwhile, New Zealand failed to secure passage to the knockout stage, losing to Sri Lanka in a low scoring affair. In the final round of matches, England beat Sri Lanka by 9 wickets in a match with no implications for the final table. The match between New Zealand and Pakistan would decide the second qualifier. Any win by New Zealand would be sufficient to see them qualify; Pakistan had not only to win, but do so by a sufficient margin to overhaul New Zealand's average run rate. An 11 run victory for Pakistan proved sufficient, as Zaheer Abbas made an unbeaten 103 before New Zealand were bowled out.

Group B started with the first shock of the tournament, as Zimbabwe beat Australia in what Wisden described as "a bigger surprise than any in the previous two world cups". Duncan Fletcher led the way, making 69* and being awarded man of the match. In the other opening Group B match, India delivered another "shocker" as they beat the holders West Indies by 34 runs, bowling them out for 228 with 35 balls to spare – the first defeat suffered by the West Indies in a World Cup as they had dominated both the 1975 and` 1979 tournaments without losing a single match in either tournament. Wet weather in the second round of games played on 11 June led to low scores. West Indies scored 252/9 in their innings, which stretched over two days, against Australia; in response, Australia were bowled out for 151 in just 30.3 overs, an effort not helped by Graeme Wood being taken to hospital with severe concussion after being hit by Michael Holding. India comfortably beat Zimbabwe by 5 wickets in the contemporaneous fixture. Two days later, Australia defeated India by 162 runs, with man of the match Trevor Chappell scoring 110 off 131 balls and Ken MacLeay taking 6/39. The other match that day was also a one-sided affair, as West Indies restricted Zimbabwe to just 217/7 in their 60 overs, despite Duncan Fletcher scoring another unbeaten half century, and then romped home with a partnership of 195 for the third wicket between Gordon Greenidge and Larry Gomes.

In the first of the return fixtures, West Indies overcame India by 66 runs, with Viv Richards making 119; for the second time in the tournament, an opposing batsman retired hurt, as Dilip Vengsarkar was the unlucky batsman on this occasion, hit in the mouth by Malcolm Marshall. Australia beat Zimbabwe by 32 runs to level their account in the tournament. The India v Zimbabwe match on 18 June was described by Wisden as "a remarkable match [which] contained one of the most spectacular innings played in this form of cricket", as Kapil Dev coming in to bat with India at 9/4 that soon became 17/5, went on to score 175 not out from India's score of 266/8, which Zimbabwe narrowly failed to chase down, India winning by 31 runs. West Indies qualified for the semi-finals with a match to spare, beating Australia by 7 wickets substantially due to a partnership of 124 for the second wicket between Greenidge and Richards. That left West Indies versus Zimbabwe as a dead rubber, and West Indies duly won by ten wickets with nearly fifteen overs to spare. The final group B match was a straightforward tussle for qualification between Australia and India. However, after India had made 247 all out, in a team effort where the highest score was 40 and there were 37 extras, Australia collapsed to 129 all out, with Madan Lal and Roger Binny taking four wickets each.

=== Group A ===
Pos	Team	Pld	W	L	T	NR	Pts	RR
1	England	6	5	1	0	0	20	4.671
2	Pakistan	6	3	3	0	0	12	4.014
3	New Zealand	6	3	3	0	0	12	3.927
4	Sri Lanka	6	1	5	0	0	4	3.752

Source: ESPNcricinfo

9 June 1983
Scorecard

England; 322/6 (60 overs)	v	New Zealand; 216 (59 overs)

England won by 106 runs
The Oval, London

9 June 1983
Scorecard

Pakistan; 338/5 (60 overs)	v	Sri Lanka; 288/9 (60 overs)

Pakistan won by 50 runs
St Helen's, Swansea

11 June 1983
Scorecard

England; 333/9 (60 overs)	v	Sri Lanka; 286 (58 overs)

England won by 47 runs
County Ground, Taunton

11 June 1983
Scorecard

New Zealand; 238/9 (60 overs)	v	Pakistan; 186 (55.2 overs)

New Zealand won by 52 runs
Edgbaston, Birmingham

13 June 1983
Scorecard

Pakistan; 193/8 (60 overs)	v	England; 199/2 (50.4 overs)

England won by 8 wickets
Lord's, London

13 June 1983
Scorecard

Sri Lanka; 206 (56.1 overs)	v	New Zealand; 209/5 (39.2 overs)

New Zealand won by 5 wickets
County Ground, Bristol

15 June 1983
Scorecard

England; 234 (55.2 overs)	v	New Zealand; 238/8 (59.5 overs)

New Zealand won by 2 wickets
Edgbaston, Birmingham

16 June 1983
Scorecard

Pakistan; 235/7 (60 overs)	v	Sri Lanka; 224 (58.3 overs)

Pakistan won by 11 runs
Headingley, Leeds

18 June 1983
Scorecard

Pakistan; 232/8 (60 overs)	v	England; 233/3 (57.2 overs)

England won by 7 wickets
Old Trafford, Manchester

18 June 1983
Scorecard

New Zealand; 181 (58.2 overs)	v	Sri Lanka; 184/7 (52.5 overs)

Sri Lanka won by 3 wickets
County Ground, Derby

20 June 1983
Scorecard

Sri Lanka; 136 (50.4 overs)	v	England; 137/1 (24.1 overs)

England won by 9 wickets
Headingley, Leeds

20 June 1983
Scorecard

Pakistan; 261/3 (60 overs)	v	New Zealand; 250 (59.1 overs)

Pakistan won by 11 runs
Trent Bridge, Nottingham

=== Group B ===
Pos	Team	Pld	W	L	T	NR	Pts	RR
1	West Indies	6	5	1	0	0	20	4.308
2	India	6	4	2	0	0	16	3.870
3	Australia	6	2	4	0	0	8	3.808
4	Zimbabwe	6	1	5	0	0	4	3.492

Source: ESPNcricinfo

9 June 1983
Scorecard

Zimbabwe; 239/6 (60 overs)	v	Australia; 226/7 (60 overs)

Zimbabwe won by 13 runs
Trent Bridge, Nottingham

9 June 1983
Scorecard

India; 262/8 (60 overs)	v	West Indies; 228 (54.1 overs)

India won by 34 runs
Old Trafford, Manchester

11 June 1983
Scorecard

West Indies; 252/9 (60 overs)	v	Australia; 151 (30.3 overs)

West Indies won by 101 runs
Headingley, Leeds

11 June 1983
Scorecard

Zimbabwe; 155 (51.4 overs)	v	India; 157/5 (37.3 overs)

India won by 5 wickets
Grace Road, Leicester

13 June 1983
Scorecard

Australia; 320/9 (60 overs)	v	India; 158 (37.5 overs)

Australia won by 162 runs
Trent Bridge, Nottingham

13 June 1983
Scorecard

Zimbabwe; 217/7 (60 overs)	v	West Indies; 218/2 (48.3 overs)

West Indies won by 8 wickets
New Road, Worcester

15 June 1983
Scorecard

West Indies; 282/9 (60 overs)	v	India; 216 (53.1 overs)

West Indies won by 66 runs
The Oval, London

16 June 1983
Scorecard

Australia; 272/7 (60 overs)	v	Zimbabwe; 240 (59.5 overs)

Australia won by 32 runs
County Ground, Southampton

18 June 1983
Scorecard

Australia; 273/6 (60 overs)	v	West Indies; 276/3 (57.5 overs)

West Indies won by 7 wickets
Lord's, London

18 June 1983
Scorecard

India; 266/8 (60 overs)	v	Zimbabwe; 235 (57 overs)

India won by 31 runs
Nevill Ground, Royal Tunbridge Wells

20 June 1983
Scorecard

India; 247 (55.5 overs)	v	Australia; 129 (38.2 overs)

India won by 118 runs
County Ground, Chelmsford

20 June 1983
Scorecard

Zimbabwe; 171 (60 overs)	v	West Indies; 172/0 (45.1 overs)

West Indies won by 10 wickets
Edgbaston, Birmingham

== Knockout stage ==
Semi-finals
22 June – Old Trafford, Manchester
England	213
India	217/4
22 June – The Oval, London
Pakistan	184/8
West Indies	188/2

Final
25 June – Lord's, London
India	183
West Indies	140

=== Semi-finals ===
22 June 1983
Scorecard

England; 213 (60 overs)	v	India; 217/4 (54.4 overs)
Graeme Fowler 33 (59); Kapil Dev 3/35 (11 overs)		Yashpal Sharma 61 (115); Ian Botham 1/40 (11 overs)

India won by 6 wickets
Old Trafford, Manchester, England
Umpires: David Evans (Eng) and Don Oslear (Eng)
Player of the match: Mohinder Amarnath (Ind)

- England won the toss and elected to bat.

In the first semi-final, at Old Trafford on 22 June, England won the toss and elected to bat. The English batsmen mistimed many balls and used the bat's edge frequently, as the restrictive Indian bowling led England to score 213 (all out, 60 overs). Graeme Fowler (33 from 59 balls, 3 fours) top scored, and Kapil Dev took 3 for 35 in eleven overs, with Mohinder Amarnath and Roger Binny taking two wickets each. In reply, Yashpal Sharma (61 from 115 balls, 3 fours, 2 sixes) and Sandeep Patil (51 from 32 balls, 8 fours) made half-centuries, as India reached their target in 54.4 overs, winning by 6 wickets in a classic victory over the previous tournament's runners-up. Mohinder Amarnath (46 from 92 balls, 4 fours, 1 six) picked up the man-of-the-match award for his all round performance, which saw him add 46 runs to his earlier bowling success (2/27 in 12 overs).

22 June 1983
Scorecard

Pakistan; 184/8 (60 overs)	v	West Indies; 188/2 (48.4 overs)
Mohsin Khan 70 (176); Malcolm Marshall 3/28 (12 overs)		Viv Richards 80 (96); Rashid Khan 1/32 (12 overs)

West Indies won by 8 wickets
The Oval, London, England
Umpires: David Constant (Eng) and Alan Whitehead (Eng)
Player of the match: Viv Richards (WI)

- West Indies won the toss and elected to field.

The second semi-final, between Pakistan and the West Indies, was staged at The Oval on the same day. West Indies won the toss and invited Pakistan to bat, whom they restricted to just 184 (8 wickets, 60 overs). Mohsin Khan (70 from 176 balls, 1 four) fought his way past 50 against the formidable West Indies bowling attack (he was the only Pakistani batsman to reach 50). Malcolm Marshall (3/28) and Andy Roberts (2/25) starred with the ball. The West Indies innings was based around a superb innings by Viv Richards (80 from 96 balls, 11 fours, 1 six), who took the man-of-the-match award, and an unbeaten half-century by Larry Gomes (50 from 100 balls, 3 fours), as the defending champions reached their target for the loss of just two wickets.

=== Final ===
25 June 1983
Scorecard

India; 183 (54.4 overs)	v	West Indies; 140 (52 overs)
Krishnamachari Srikkanth 38 (57); Andy Roberts 3/32 (10 overs)		Viv Richards 33 (28); Mohinder Amarnath 3/12 (7 overs)

India won by 43 runs
Lord's, London
Umpires: Dickie Bird (Eng) and Barrie Meyer (Eng)
Player of the match: Mohinder Amarnath (Ind)

- West Indies won the toss and elected to field.
- Faoud Bacchus (WI) played his final international match.

In the final, India lost the toss and were asked to bat first against the West Indies. Only Krishnamachari Srikkanth (38 from 57 balls) and Mohinder Amarnath (26 from 80 balls) put up any significant resistance as Roberts, Marshall, Joel Garner and Michael Holding ripped through the Indian batsmen, ably supported by Gomes. Surprising resistance by the tail allowed India to compile 183 (all out, 54.4 overs). Sandeep Patil and Madan Lal saved the game to get the team past the 150-run mark at a critical point in the match where India scored 183 runs. Without those two batsmen, India's score would have been lower. The Indian bowling exploited the weather and pitch conditions perfectly to bowl out the West Indies for 140 from 52 overs, winning by 43 runs and completing one of the most stunning upsets in cricket history. It still remains the lowest ever total successfully defended in a World Cup final. Amarnath and Madan Lal each took three wickets. Viv Richards, was West Indies' top scorer with 33 from 28 balls. Kant was the most economical bowler, conceding 0 runs from his two overs. Amarnath was once again awarded the Man of the Match award for his all-round performance. There was no 'Man of the Series' awarded in 1983.

== Statistics ==
Leading run scorers
Player	Team	Runs
David Gower	England	384
Viv Richards	West Indies	367
Graeme Fowler	England	360
Zaheer Abbas	Pakistan	313
Kapil Dev	India	303

- Source: CricInfo

Leading wicket takers
Player	Team	Wickets
Roger Binny	India	18
Ashantha de Mel	Sri Lanka	17
Madan Lal	India	17
Richard Hadlee	New Zealand	14
Vic Marks	England	13

- Source: CricInfo

== In popular culture ==
- The 2021 Indian biographical film 83 portrays Team India's triumph in the World Cup. Indian actor Ranveer Singh played the role of India captain Kapil Dev in the film.
- 1983, a 2014 Indian Malayalam language film that had the core of its story based on the 1983 Cricket World Cup. It centered on Rameshan, played by Nivin Pauly, and his memories from 1983, when India won its first World Cup under Kapil Dev.
