= 1983 Cricket World Cup Group B =

== Overview ==
| Pos | Team | Pld | W | L | T | NR | Pts | RR |
|---|---|---|---|---|---|---|---|---|
| 1 | West Indies | 6 | 5 | 1 | 0 | 0 | 20 | 4.308 |
| 2 | India | 6 | 4 | 2 | 0 | 0 | 16 | 3.870 |
| 3 | Australia | 6 | 2 | 4 | 0 | 0 | 8 | 3.808 |
| 4 | Zimbabwe | 6 | 1 | 5 | 0 | 0 | 4 | 3.492 |

Source: ESPNcricinfo

== Australia v Zimbabwe ==
9 June 1983
Scorecard

| Zimbabwe; 239/6 (60 overs) | v | Australia; 226/7 (60 overs) |
| Duncan Fletcher 69* (84); Graham Yallop 2/28 (9 overs) | | Kepler Wessels 76 (130); Duncan Fletcher 4/42 (11 overs) |

Zimbabwe won by 13 runs
Trent Bridge, Nottingham, England
Umpires: David Constant and Mervyn Kitchen
Player of the match: Duncan Fletcher

- This was Zimbabwe's first international match, and their first win.

== India vs West Indies ==
9 June 1983
Scorecard

| India; 262/8 (60 overs) | v | West Indies; 228 (54.1 overs) |
| Yashpal Sharma 89 (120); Michael Holding 2/32 (12 overs) | | Joel Garner 37 (29); Ravi Shastri 3/26 (5.1 overs) |

India won by 34 runs
Old Trafford, Manchester, England
Umpires: Barrie Leadbeater and Alan Whitehead
Player of the match: Yashpal Sharma

- Reserve day on 10 June used, 22 overs of West Indies's innings completed on 9 June. This was West Indies's first defeat in a world cup.

== Australia vs West Indies ==
11 June 1983
Scorecard

| West Indies; 252/9 (60 overs) | v | Australia; 151 (30.3 overs) |
| Larry Gomes 78 (153); Geoff Lawson 3/29 (12 overs) | | David Hookes 45 (45); Winston Davis 7/51 (10.3 overs) |

West Indies won by 101 runs
Headingley, Leeds, England
Umpires: David Constant and David Evans
Player of the match: Winston Davis

- Reserve day on 12 June used, 42 overs of West Indies's innings completed on 11 June.

== India vs Zimbabwe ==
11 June 1983
Scorecard

| Zimbabwe; 155 (51.4 overs) | v | India; 157/5 (37.3 overs) |
| Iain Butchart 22* (35); Madan Lal 3/27 (10.4 overs) | | Sandeep Patil 50 (54); Peter Rawson 2/11 (5.1 overs) |

India won by 5 wickets
Grace Road, Leicester, England
Umpires: Jack Birkenshaw and Roy Palmer
Player of the match: Madan Lal

== Australia vs India ==
13 June 1983
Scorecard

| Australia; 320/9 (60 overs) | v | India; 158 (37.5 overs) |
| Trevor Chappell 110 (131); Kapil Dev 5/43 (12 overs) | | Kapil Dev 40 (27); Ken MacLeay 6/39 (11.5 overs) |

Australia won by 162 runs
Trent Bridge, Nottingham, England
Umpires: Don Oslear and Roy Palmer
Player of the match: Trevor Chappell

== West Indies vs Zimbabwe ==
13 June 1983
Scorecard

| Zimbabwe; 217/7 (60 overs) | v | West Indies; 218/2 (48.3 overs) |
| Duncan Fletcher 71* (88); Andy Roberts 3/36 (12 overs) | | Gordon Greenidge 105* (147); Peter Rawson 2/39 (12 overs) |

West Indies won by 8 wickets
New Road, Worcester, England
Umpires: Jack Birkenshaw and David Evans
Player of the match: Gordon Greenidge

== India vs West Indies ==
15 June 1983
Scorecard

| West Indies; 282/9 (60 overs) | v | India; 216 (53.1 overs) |
| Viv Richards 119 (146); Roger Binny 3/71 (12 overs) | | Mohinder Amarnath 80 (139); Michael Holding 3/40 (9.1 overs) |

West Indies won by 66 runs
The Oval, London, England
Umpires: Barrie Meyer and David Shepherd
Player of the match: Viv Richards

== Australia vs Zimbabwe ==
16 June 1983
Scorecard

| Australia; 272/7 (60 overs) | v | Zimbabwe; 240 (59.5 overs) |
| Graeme Wood 73 (121); John Traicos 2/28 (12 overs) | | David Houghton 84 (108); Rodney Hogg 3/40 (11.5 overs) |

Australia won by 32 runs
County Ground, Southampton, England
Umpires: David Evans and Roy Palmer
Player of the match: David Houghton

== Australia vs West Indies ==
18 June 1983
Scorecard

| Australia; 273/6 (60 overs) | v | West Indies; 276/3 (57.5 overs) |
| Kim Hughes 69 (124); Malcolm Marshall 2/36 (12 overs) | | Viv Richards 95* (117); Rodney Hogg 1/25 (12 overs) |

West Indies won by 7 wickets
Lord's, London, England
Umpires: Roy Palmer and Alan Whitehead
Player of the match: Viv Richards

== India vs Zimbabwe ==
18 June 1983
Scorecard

| India; 266/8 (60 overs) | v | Zimbabwe; 235 (57 overs) |
| Kapil Dev 175* (138); Peter Rawson 3/47 (12 overs) | | Kevin Curran 73 (93); Madan Lal 3/42 (11 overs) |

India won by 31 runs
Nevill Ground, Royal Tunbridge Wells
Umpires: Barrie Meyer and Mervyn Kitchen
Player of the match: Kapil Dev

- India won the toss and elected to bat.
- Kapil Dev came in when India were 4/9, and soon after they were 5/17. He scored 75 in the last 11 overs.
- Kapil Dev became the first player for India to score an ODI hundred.
- Kapil Dev scored the then-highest individual ODI score at the ICC Cricket World Cup.

== Australia v India ==
20 June 1983
Scorecard

| India; 247 (55.5 overs) | v | Australia; 129 (39.2 overs) |
| Yashpal Sharma 40 (40); Rodney Hogg 3/40 (12 overs) | | Allan Border 36 (49); Madan Lal 4/20 (8.2 overs) |

India won by 118 runs
County Ground, Chelmsford
Umpires: Jack Birkenshaw and David Shepherd
Player of the match: Roger Binny

== West Indies vs Zimbabwe ==
20 June 1983
Scorecard

| Zimbabwe; 171 (60 overs) | v | West Indies; 172/0 (45.1 overs) |
| Kevin Curran 62 (92); Wayne Daniel 3/28 (9 overs) | | Desmond Haynes 88* (136); John Traicos 0/24 (12 overs) |

West Indies won by 10 wickets
Edgbaston, Birmingham, England
Umpires: Dickie Bird and David Constant
Player of the match: Faoud Bacchus
