= 1983 Cricket World Cup Group A =

Cricket tournament group stage

== Overview ==
| Pos | Team | Pld | W | L | T | NR | Pts | RR |
|---|---|---|---|---|---|---|---|---|
| 1 | England | 6 | 5 | 1 | 0 | 0 | 20 | 4.671 |
| 2 | Pakistan | 6 | 3 | 3 | 0 | 0 | 12 | 4.014 |
| 3 | New Zealand | 6 | 3 | 3 | 0 | 0 | 12 | 3.927 |
| 4 | Sri Lanka | 6 | 1 | 5 | 0 | 0 | 4 | 3.752 |

Source: ESPNcricinfo

== England vs New Zealand ==
9 June 1983
Scorecard

| England; 322/6 (60 overs) | v | New Zealand; 216 (59 overs) |
| Allan Lamb 102 (105); Martin Snedden 2/105 (12 overs) | | Martin Crowe 97 (118); Bob Willis 2/9 (7 overs) |

England won by 106 runs
The Oval, London, England
Umpires: Barrie Meyer and Don Oslear
Player of the match: Allan Lamb

== Pakistan vs Sri Lanka ==
9 June 1983
Scorecard

| Pakistan; 338/5 (60 overs) | v | Sri Lanka; 288/9 (60 overs) |
| Zaheer Abbas 82 (81); Ashantha de Mel 2/69 (12 overs) | | Brendon Kuruppu 72 (101); Sarfraz Nawaz 3/40 (12 overs) |

Pakistan won by 50 runs
St Helen's, Swansea, Wales
Umpires: Ken Palmer and David Shepherd
Player of the match: Mohsin Khan

== England vs Sri Lanka ==
11 June 1983
Scorecard

| England; 333/9 (60 overs) | v | Sri Lanka; 286 (58 overs) |
| David Gower 130 (120); Ashantha de Mel 2/62 (12 overs) | | Guy de Alwis 58 (51); Vic Marks 5/39 (12 overs) |

England won by 47 runs
County Ground, Taunton, England
Umpires: Mervyn Kitchen and Ken Palmer
Player of the match: David Gower

== New Zealand vs Pakistan ==
11 June 1983
Scorecard

| New Zealand; 238/9 (60 overs) | v | Pakistan; 186 (55.2 overs) |
| Bruce Edgar 44 (107); Abdul Qadir 4/21 (12 overs) | | Abdul Qadir 41* (68); Richard Hadlee 3/20 (9 overs) |

New Zealand won by 52 runs
Edgbaston, Birmingham, England
Umpires: Dickie Bird and Barrie Leadbeater
Player of the match: Abdul Qadir

- Reserve day on 12 June used, 56 overs of New Zealand's innings completed on 11 June.

== England vs Pakistan ==
13 June 1983
Scorecard

| Pakistan; 193/8 (60 overs) | v | England; 199/2 (50.4 overs) |
| Zaheer Abbas 83 (104); Bob Willis 2/24 (12 overs) | | Graeme Fowler 78* (151); Rashid Khan 1/19 (7 overs) |

England won by 8 wickets
Lord's, London, England
Umpires: Barrie Meyer and Alan Whitehead
Player of the match: Zaheer Abbas

== New Zealand vs Sri Lanka ==
13 June 1983
Scorecard

| Sri Lanka; 206 (56.1 overs) | v | New Zealand; 209/5 (39.2 overs) |
| Ranjan Madugalle 60 (87); Richard Hadlee 5/25 (10.1 overs) | | Geoff Howarth 76 (79); Ashantha de Mel 2/30 (8 overs) |

New Zealand won by 5 wickets
County Ground, Bristol, England
Umpires: Dickie Bird and David Shepherd
Player of the match: Richard Hadlee

== England vs New Zealand ==
15 June 1983
Scorecard

| England; 234 (55.2 overs) | v | New Zealand; 238/8 (59.5 overs) |
| David Gower 92* (96 balls); Richard Hadlee 3/32 (10 overs) | | Jeremy Coney 66* (97 balls); Bob Willis 4/42 (12 overs) |

New Zealand won by 2 wickets
Edgbaston, Birmingham, England
Umpires: Jack Birkenshaw and Ken Palmer
Player of the match: Jeremy Coney

== Pakistan vs Sri Lanka ==
16 June 1983
Scorecard

| Pakistan; 235/7 (60 overs) | v | Sri Lanka; 224 (58.3 overs) |
| Imran Khan 102* (133); Ashantha de Mel 5/39 (12 overs) | | Sidath Wettimuny 50 (127); Abdul Qadir 5/44 (12 overs) |

Pakistan won by 11 runs
Headingley, Leeds, England
Umpires: Don Oslear and Alan Whitehead
Player of the match: Abdul Qadir

== England vs Pakistan ==
18 June 1983
Scorecard

| Pakistan; 232/8 (60 overs) | v | England; 233/3 (57.2 overs) |
| Javed Miandad 67 (100); Vic Marks 2/45 (12 overs) | | Graeme Fowler 69 (96); Mudassar Nazar 2/34 (12 overs) |

England won by 7 wickets
Old Trafford, Manchester, England
Umpires: Dickie Bird and Don Oslear
Player of the match: Graeme Fowler

== New Zealand v Sri Lanka ==
18 June 1983
Scorecard

| New Zealand; 181 (58.2 overs) | v | Sri Lanka; 184/7 (52.5 overs) |
| Martin Snedden 40 (55); Ashantha de Mel 5/32 (12 overs) | | Roy Dias 64* (101); Martin Snedden 2/58 (10.5 overs) |

Sri Lanka won by 3 wickets
County Ground, Derby, England
Umpires: David Constant and Barrie Leadbeater
Player of the match: Ashantha de Mel

== England vs Sri Lanka ==
20 June 1983
Scorecard

| Sri Lanka; 136 (50.4 overs) | v | England; 137/1 (24.1 overs) |
| Sidath Wettimuny 22 (49); Paul Allott 3/41 (10.4 overs) | | Graeme Fowler 81 (77); Ashantha de Mel 1/33 (10 overs) |

England won by 9 wickets
Headingley, Leeds, England
Umpires: Barrie Leadbeater and Ken Palmer
Player of the match: Bob Willis

== New Zealand v Pakistan ==
20 June 1983
Scorecard

| Pakistan; 261/3 (60 overs) | v | New Zealand; 250 (59.1 overs) |
| Zaheer Abbas 103* (121); Jeremy Coney 2/42 (12 overs) | | Jeremy Coney 51 (78); Mudassar Nazar 3/43 (12 overs) |

Pakistan won by 11 runs
Trent Bridge, Nottingham, England
Umpires: David Evans and Mervyn Kitchen
Player of the match: Imran Khan
