= 1979 Cricket World Cup officials =

The 2nd Cricket World Cup was played in England on six different venues. A total of 15 matches were played in 1979 Cricket World Cup including 2 Semifinals and a Final match.

== Umpires ==
8 umpires were selected to supervise 16 matches of the World Cup. All of them belonged to the England. The first semifinal was supervised by John Langridge and Ken Palmer while Lloyd Budd and David Constant supervised the second semifinal.

Dickie Bird and Barrie Meyer were elected to stand in the final.

Umpire	Country	Matches
Alan Whitehead	England	4
Barrie Meyer	England	3
David Constant	England	3
David Evans	England	2
Dickie Bird	England	4
John Langridge	England	3
Ken Palmer	England	5
Lloyd Budd	England	4
