= Eifion Jones (cricketer) =

Welsh cricketer

Eifion Wyn Jones (born 25 June 1942 in Velindre, Glamorgan) is a Welsh cricketer who played for Glamorgan County Cricket Club.

When he first came to Glamorgan, Jones was a specialist right-handed batsman but after being tutored by Phil Clift he became a wicketkeeper. He made his first-class debut in 1961, and served as deputy keeper to David Evans until the late 1960s, when he became the county's first-choice keeper, a position he held until 1982. He had a record 933 dismissals for his county. In 1970 he took 7 dismissals in an innings against Cambridge University, and finished the season with 94 dismissals. However, the continued good form of Alan Knott and Bob Taylor kept him out of consideration for the Test team.

In 1968, he made the highest ever score by a Glamorgan keeper with 146 not out against Sussex. His most successful season with the bat was Glamorgan's championship season of 1969, when he scored 753 runs at an average of 31.37. Thereafter, his batting gradually declined, and after 1975 he never averaged as high as 20 in a season. He retired after the 1983 season, at the age of 41.
