= Yashpal Sharma (cricketer) =

Indian cricketer (1954–2021)

Personal information
- Born: 11 August 1954; Ludhiana, Punjab, India
- Died: 13 July 2021 (aged 66); New Delhi, India
- Batting: Right-handed
- Bowling: Right-arm medium
- Role: Batsman

International information
- National side: India (1978–1985)
- Test debut (cap 145): 2 August 1979 v England
- Last Test: 3 November 1983 v West Indies
- ODI debut (cap 26): 13 October 1978 v Pakistan
- Last ODI: 27 January 1985 v England
- ODI shirt no.: 68

Domestic team information
- Years: Team
- 1973/74–1986/87: Punjab
- 1987/88–1989/90: Haryana
- 1991/92–1992/93: Railways

Umpiring information
- WODIs umpired: 2 (1997)

Career statistics
Competition	Test	ODI	FC	LA
Matches	37	42	160	74
Runs scored	1,606	883	8,933	1,859
Batting average	33.45	28.48	44.88	34.42
100s/50s	2/9	0/4	21/46	0/12
Top score	140	89	201*	91
Balls bowled	30	201	3,650	568
Wickets	1	1	47	13
Bowling average	17.00	199.00	33.70	36.76
5 wickets in innings	0	0	1	0
10 wickets in match	0	0	0	0
Best bowling	1/6	1/27	5/106	4/41
Catches/stumpings	16/–	10/–	90/2	28/1
Medal record
Men's Cricket
Representing India
ICC Cricket World Cup
Winner	1983 England and Wales
- Source: CricInfo, 13 July 2021

Yashpal Sharma (Punjabi: ਯਸ਼ਪਾਲ ਸ਼ਰਮਾ,; 11 August 1954 – 13 July 2021) was an Indian international cricketer. He was a middle order batsman who played during the 1970s and 80s. He was a member of the Indian team that won the 1983 Cricket World Cup. He represented India in 37 Tests and 42 One Day Internationals (ODIs) between 1978 and 1985. His nephew Chetan Sharma was also a cricketer. He was fondly nicknamed by Sunil Gavaskar as the Crisis Man for India.

== Early career ==
Yashpal Sharma first drew attention when he scored 260 for Punjab schools against Jammu & Kashmir schools in 1972. Within two years, he was in the state team, and a member of the North Zone team that won the Vizzy Trophy. His first major innings in first class cricket was a 173 in the Duleep Trophy for the North, against the South Zone which had Chandrasekhar, Erapalli Prasanna and Venkataraghavan.

== International career ==
His knock of 99 in the Irani Trophy helped secure a place for him in the Indian team in a tour of Pakistan a few weeks later. He subsequently made his ODI debut during the tour of Pakistan on 13 October 1978, scoring 11 out of a total team score of 79 all out. He went to England in 1979 as a part of the team that played in the World Cup. He did not play in any of the matches during the 1979 World Cup butappeared in three Test series that followed. He scored 884 runs at an average of 58 in the tour matches. He made his Test debut on 2 August 1979 against England at Lord's. His form in England assured him of a Test place in the next few games. After scoring a pair against Australia in the Kanpur Test, Sharma scored his first Test hundred in the very next match. He missed out on another century as he scored an unbeaten 85 runs off 117 balls in the next Test at Calcutta, but with 3.4 overs still left before the end of the Test, he unsuccessfully appealed against light.

He made his highest first class score against Victoria in 1980–81, a 465-minute 201*. In the Adelaide Test of that series, Sharma hit 47 in a 147-run partnership with Sandeep Patil. This was his only innings of some consequence in the tour and he was soon dropped from the team. On his comeback, at Madras in 1981–82, he hit 140 against England. He batted through the full second day of the match with Gundappa Viswanath and their third-wicket partnership contributed 316 runs. At Port of Spain next year, he was struck on the head by Malcolm Marshall and forced to retire. However, he came back to bat in the same innings and scored a fifty.

After a few ordinary performances, Sharma was picked for the Indian team for the 1983 World Cup. In the opening match of the tournament, he top scored with 89 as India caused West Indies their first defeat in a World Cup match. The West Indies had been favourites to win at odds of 66–1. Sharma very much won the day for them, and he recounted that he had a volley of marks on his chest from Malcolm Marshall's short-pitched bowling. A Bollywood film, 83, was made about this World Cup triumph. The part of Marshall was played by Marshall's son, Mali.

In the semifinal against England he again top scored with 61 – a flick over square leg for six off a near yorker from Bob Willis being a memorable shot. He was part of the Indian team which won its maiden World Cup tournament which eventually came during the 1983 campaign. He was also the second leading run scorer for India during the 1983 World Cup with 240 runs in eight matches.

== Retirement ==
Back home, he failed completely against the touring Pakistanis. In the three-day match for North Zone against the West Indies at Amritsar, he hit Viv Richards for four consecutive sixes. But two more failures in the international matches against them ended his career. He appeared in four one day matches against England the next year and scored more than ten in one of these matches. Sharma left Punjab and joined Haryana in 1987–88. He spent another two years with Railways. At the age of 37, he was still good enough to score hundreds in consecutive matches in 1991–92. After he retired from the game, he became an umpire for a time, and was also a selector for the Indian national team.

== Chief selector ==
He served as India's national cricket selector from 2003 to 2006. During the tumultuous period of Indian cricket between 2005 and 2007, he supported Indian cricket captain Sourav Ganguly over the coach Greg Chappell and was also ousted from the selection committee in 2005. After being removed from national selection committee prior to the home series against Sri Lanka in 2005, he accused Chappell of questioning his integrity and interfering with selection of the team. However, Chappell remarked that his spat with Ganguly was "blown out of proportion" and went on to say, "He [Yashpal] was frustrated that he lost a job which he obviously wanted to keep. I had no part in him losing his job, but he had to take it out on someone.".

He again became selector for the national team in 2008 and served until 2011. During his second tenure as selector, India won the 2011 Cricket World Cup. He later served as the coach for Uttar Pradesh Ranji Team. In 2014, he was appointed as the head of Delhi's cricket advisory committee.

== Cause of death ==
He died on 13 July 2021 at age 66 due to a massive heart attack.

== Legacy ==
In 2021, the Board of Control for Cricket in India conducted a day/night benefit cricket match in honour of Yashpal Sharma.

== In popular culture ==
A Bollywood film titled 83 released in 2021 about the event of India's first world cup win at Lords. The film features Jatin Sarna as Sharma and is directed and produced by Kabir Khan and Anurag Kashyap respectively.

== Notes ==
- Cricketarchive and the current version of Cricinfo supply no middle name for Sharma. But a middle name 'Baburam' appears in an older version of Cricinfo, Indian Cricket and Sujit Mukherjee.
