= Rashid Khan (Pakistani cricketer) =

Pakistani cricketer (born 1959)

Personal information
- Full name: Rashid Khan
- Born: 15 December 1959 (age 66); Karachi, Sindh, Pakistan
- Batting: Right-handed
- Bowling: Right-arm fast-medium
- Role: Bowler

International information
- National side: Pakistan (1980–1985)
- Test debut (cap 89): 5 March 1982 v Sri Lanka
- Last Test: 9 February 1985 v New Zealand
- ODI debut (cap 34): 19 December 1980 v West Indies
- Last ODI: 24 February 1985 v Australia

Career statistics
Competition	Test	ODI	FC	LA
Matches	4	29	149	122
Runs scored	155	110	2,163	385
Batting average	51.66	13.75	16.38	10.69
100s/50s	0/1	0/0	0/5	0/0
Top score	59	17	73	27*
Balls bowled	738	1,414	21,119	5,293
Wickets	8	20	426	103
Bowling average	45.00	46.15	25.74	33.78
5 wickets in innings	0	0	25	0
10 wickets in match	0	0	7	0
Best bowling	3/129	3/47	9/27	4/27
Catches/stumpings	2/–	3/–	82/–	31/–
- Source: ESPNcricinfo, 10 March 2017

Rashid Khan (born 15 December 1959) is a Pakistani former cricketer who played in four Test matches and 29 One Day Internationals between 1980 and 1985. In 2006 he became the coach of the Chinese cricket team.
