= Don Oslear =

English cricket umpire

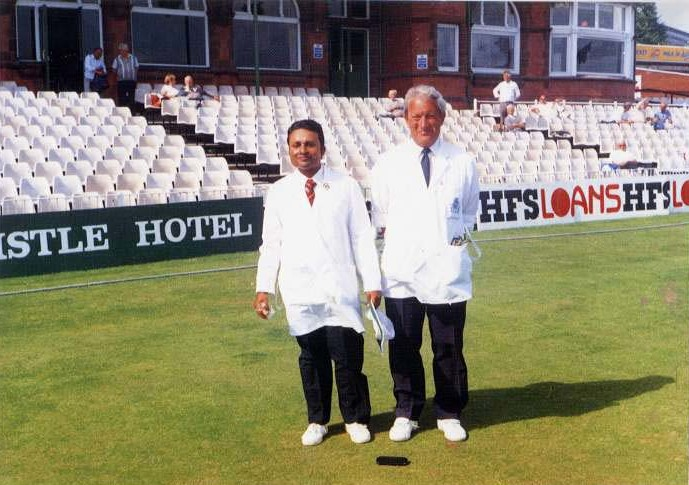
- Oslear (right), standing next to Ajith Perera

Personal information
- Full name: Donald Osmund Oslear
- Born: 3 March 1929; Cleethorpes, Lincolnshire, England
- Died: 10 May 2018 (aged 89); Grimsby, Lincolnshire, England

Umpiring information
- Tests umpired: 5 (1980–1984)
- ODIs umpired: 8 (1980–1984)
- Source: Cricinfo, 28 August 2010

Donald Osmund Oslear (3 March 1929 – 10 May 2018) was a Test cricket umpire from England.

Don Oslear was born in Cleethorpes, Lincolnshire, England, in 1929 and joined the first-class panel in 1975 at the age of 46 without any first-class playing experience. He stood in five Test matches between 1980 and 1984 and eight One Day Internationals, including a semi-final of the 1983 World Cup. He umpired 360 first-class matches between 1975 and 1993. Alongside John Holder, he is credited with the idea of a 'bowl-out' to decide a drawn match after the 55-over 1987 Tilcon Trophy final had been washed out by rain. The organisers had ordered them to think of another way of settling the match rather than the traditional and sometimes unpopular means of the toss of a coin. This idea was subsequently adopted in all ECB limited-overs competitions.

== See also ==
- List of Test cricket umpires
- List of One Day International cricket umpires
