= David Constant =

English cricketer and umpire

Personal information
- Full name: David John Constant
- Born: 9 November 1941 (age 85); Bradford-upon-Avon, Wiltshire
- Nickname: Connie

Umpiring information
- Tests umpired: 36 (1971–1988)
- ODIs umpired: 33 (1972–2001)
- WODIs umpired: 1 (2001)
- Source: CricInfo, 8 September 2007

David John Constant (born 9 November 1941) is a former English professional cricketer and cricket umpire. He played first-class cricket from 1961 to 1968 for Kent County Cricket Club and Leicestershire County Cricket Club. He later became an international umpire, officiating in 36 Test matches from 1971 to 1988 and 33 one-day internationals from 1972 to 2001. He also spent nearly four decades as a first-class umpire.

Constant began his first-class cricket career with Kent in 1961 before moving to Leicestershire in 1965 and playing there until 1968. He was a middle-order batsman who made 67 first-class appearances. In total he scored 1,517 first-class runs at a batting average of 19.20 with a highest score of 80. Tony Lewis described his innings against Glamorgan on a difficult pitch at Leicester in 1965 as "one of the bravest innings I ever saw".

His umpiring debut match was the Third Test between England and Pakistan in July 1971. He last stood in an international cricket match in the England v. Australia One Day International at The Oval, London in June 2001. He was the longest-serving umpire in county cricket, spending 38 years on the first-class umpires' list.

== See also ==
- List of Test cricket umpires
- List of One Day International cricket umpires
