= David Evans (umpire) =

Welsh cricketer and umpire

Personal information
- Full name: David Gwilym Lloyd Evans
- Born: 27 July 1933; Lambeth, London, England
- Died: 25 March 1990 (aged 56); Drefach, Ceredigion, Wales
- Batting: Right-handed
- Role: Wicket-keeper

Domestic team information
- Years: Team
- 1956–1969: Glamorgan

Umpiring information
- Tests umpired: 9 (1981–1985)
- ODIs umpired: 13 (1979–1985)

Career statistics
Competition	First-class	List A
Matches	270	5
Runs scored	2875	9
Batting average	10.53	4.50
100s/50s	0/0	0/0
Top score	46*	8
Balls bowled	24	0
Wickets	0	–
Bowling average	–	–
5 wickets in innings	0	–
10 wickets in match	0	n/a
Best bowling	–	–
Catches/stumpings	503/55	6/0
- Source: Cricinfo, 28 March 2022

David Gwilym Lloyd Evans (27 July 1933 – 25 March 1990) was a cricketer who played as a wicketkeeper for Glamorgan from 1956 to 1969 and then became a first-class umpire in 1971, standing in nine Tests from 1981 to 1985.

== Cricketer ==
Born at Lambeth, London, but brought up in West Wales, Evans joined Glamorgan in the mid-1950s and became first-choice wicketkeeper after the retirement of Haydn Davies at the end of the 1958 season. For several seasons at the start of the 1960s, he was at or near the top of the wicketkeeping lists of dismissals with 79, 82 and then 89 dismissals in the seasons from 1961 to 1963. The 89 dismissals in 1963 set a new county record for Glamorgan, though it has since been surpassed by Eifion Jones, and made Evans the leading wicketkeeper of the year. As a right-handed batsman, he was very much a tail-ender, though in a county side that had more than its fair share of rabbits, with Don Shepherd, Jeff Jones and Ossie Wheatley in the team, he often batted higher than he might have done in other sides. He did not, though, pass 50 in any first-class innings.

Injured for part of the 1964 season, Evans was replaced by Eifion Jones, but regained his place for three more seasons. Jones' better batting, though, saw him displace Evans as first choice from 1968, and though Evans was granted a benefit in 1969, he left first-class cricket at the end of the season.

== Umpire ==
Evans had already shown interest in coaching and umpiring while a first-class cricketer. In the 1967-68 off-season, he travelled to Australia on a Winston Churchill Fellowship to study coaching methods. After his retirement in 1969, he returned to first-class cricket very quickly, qualifying as an umpire and being appointed to the first-class list for the 1971 English cricket season. In 1981, he graduated to the Test panel, and umpired his first Test in the dramatic match between England and Australia when Ian Botham's 149 and Bob Willis's eight for 43 won a match that had seemed lost. Later matches included England games against India, New Zealand and Pakistan, and he was one of the umpires for the first Test played by Sri Lanka in England in 1984.

Shortly after standing in the Lord's Test in the 1985 Ashes series, Evans was taken ill and in September 1985 he underwent heart surgery. He returned to the first-class umpires list in 1986 for a further four seasons with a slightly diminished schedule, and did not stand in any further Tests. He had been reappointed to the umpires' panel for the 1990 season, but died at Cwmpengraig, Drefach, Llandysul, Dyfed, before it began.

== Name and birthplace ==
Evans' second name was not used at all during his playing career, where he was referred to as "D. L. Evans". In various places it is spelled "Gwilym" (www.cricketarchive.com, www.cricinfo.com), "Gwillim" (The Cricketers' Who's Who) and "Gwilliam" (obituary in Wisden, 1990). As a player, his birthplace was given in Wisden as Ammanford, where he was brought up.
