= 1982 Benson & Hedges Cup final =

1982 Benson & Hedges Cup Final
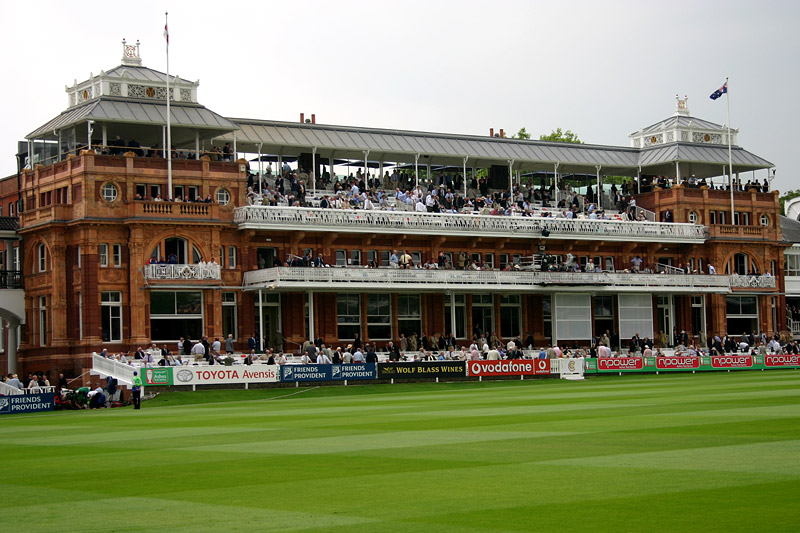
- The final was played at Lord's
- Event: 1982 Benson & Hedges Cup
Nottinghamshire	Somerset
130	132/1
50.1 overs	33.1 overs
- Somerset won by nine wickets
- Date: 24 July 1982
- Venue: Lord's, London
- Man of the match: Vic Marks (Somerset)
- Umpires: David Constant and David Evans

The 1982 Benson & Hedges Cup Final was a one-day cricket match between Nottinghamshire County Cricket Club and Somerset County Cricket Club played on 24 July 1982 at Lord's in London. It was the eleventh final of the Benson & Hedges Cup. Somerset were holders, after beating Surrey in the previous year's final, while Nottinghamshire were making their debut in a one-day final, though they had won the 1981 County Championship.

After winning the toss, Somerset captain Brian Rose opted to bowl first. Nottinghamshire were bowled out for 130 from 50.1 overs; Basher Hassan and Clive Rice top-scored with 26 and 27 runs respectively. Somerset's Vic Marks and Joel Garner both bowled well, taking five of the wickets between them, but it was suggested that Nottinghamshire failed to cope with the pressure of the occasion. In their response, Somerset only lost one wicket, that of Peter Denning for 22. Afterwards, Peter Roebuck and Viv Richards shared an unbroken century partnership, each making a half-century, to complete a dominant nine-wicket victory with more than twenty overs remaining. Marks was named as man of the match.

== Background ==
The Benson & Hedges Cup was established in 1972; the third one-day tournament in England, after the Gillette Cup (established in 1963) and the John Player League (established in 1969). It was considered less prestigious than the Gillette Cup; ESPNcricinfo described it as "the League Cup final to the Gillette's FA Cup". It was Nottinghamshire County Cricket Club's first appearance in a Lord's final, and they were considered underdogs for the match despite having won the 1981 County Championship. Somerset came into the competition as holders, having beaten Surrey in the 1981 final. They were consistently strong performers in one-day cricket, and had also won the 1979 Gillette Cup Final and the 1979 John Player League.

== Route to the final ==
Nottinghamshire played in Group B, alongside Lancashire, Northamptonshire, Scotland and Warwickshire. They won all four of their matches during the group stage to top the group, leading to a home quarter-final against Leicestershire. Nottinghamshire opted to bat first in the match, in which they were bowled out for 156; Basher Hassan top-scored for the county with 48 runs. During Leicestershire's response, economical bowling from Mike Hendrick and Michael Bore in particular helped them to restrict the total to 154 for nine; a two-run victory. They faced Lancashire again in the semi-final, and put in a good all-round bowling performance to bowl them out for 182. In response, a half-century from Richard Hadlee helped Nottinghamshire to a four-wicket victory, and secured them a place in the final.

In Group D, Somerset faced Glamorgan, Gloucestershire, Middlesex and a combined Oxford & Cambridge Universities team. Somerset won their first match easily, against the universities, but lost their second, getting bowled out for 98 runs by Middlesex, who won by six wickets. In their final two matches, Somerset successfully defended a low total against Glamorgan, and then made their highest Benson & Hedges Cup score, 307 during a win over Gloucestershire. They finished second in their group, and travelled to Kent in the quarter-finals. Kent scored 207, which Somerset chased down with two balls to spare, aided by half-centuries from Peter Roebuck and Brian Rose. Somerset hosted Sussex in the semi-final, and enjoyed an easy victory after four wickets from Joel Garner helped to bowl the visitors out for 110. Somerset reached their target after 36.1 overs; Peter Denning top-scored with 68*.

== Match ==
=== Summary ===
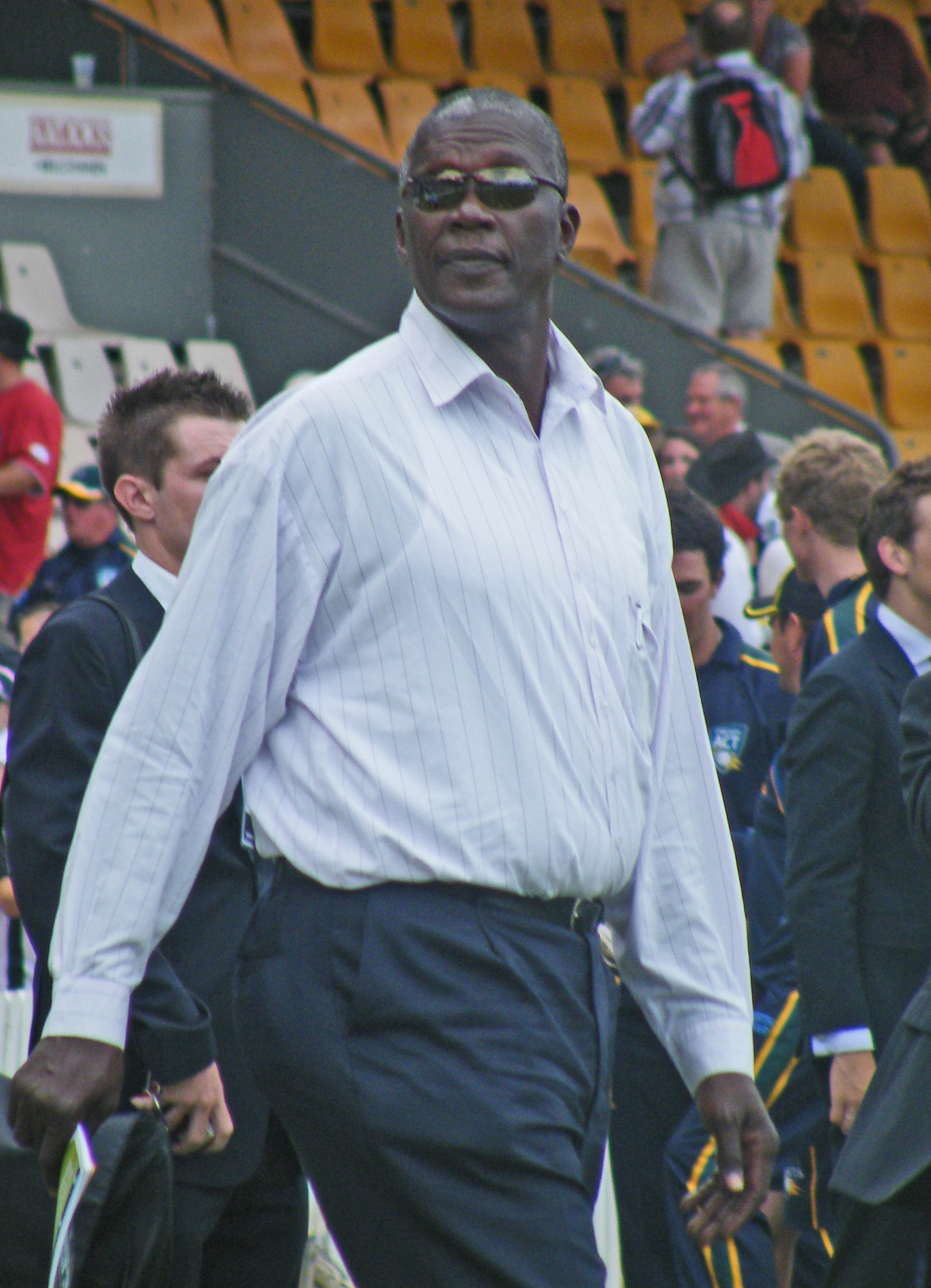
Joel Garner took three wickets to help bowl Nottinghamshire out for 130 runs, the lowest total in a Benson & Hedges Cup final.

The final was played at Lord's on 25 July, and started at 10:45. Somerset captain Rose won the toss and chose to field first in overcast conditions. Joel Garner opened the bowling for Somerset, and after keeping Paul Todd on his back foot during his first over, he bowled him with a yorker in the second over, leaving Nottinghamshire three for one. (Note: "Three for one" is cricket shorthand which indicates that the batting team had scored three runs and lost one wicket.) Tim Robinson and Derek Randall batted through until the seventeenth over, moving the score onto 40 for one, before Robinson was caught at mid-wicket by Viv Richards off the bowling of Colin Dredge for 13. The next over, Randall was bowled for 19, attempting to cut Vic Marks' second delivery, and having lost two wickets without scoring, Nottinghamshire were 40 for three. Basher Hassan and Clive Rice built a partnership, moving the score onto 86, until Rice got out just before lunch. Rice had been targeting the bowling of Marks; he had previously driven him for six, but attacking a similar ball he moved forwards out of his crease to try the same stroke, but was bowled. Hassan was later caught behind off the bowling of Dredge. Garner, whose first spell had been described by The Observer's Scyld Berry as "relatively expensive", claimed two more wickets with yorkers, while Ian Botham and Hallam Moseley each also took a wicket with yorkers. Of Nottinghamshire's final six batsmen, only Richard Hadlee reached double figures, and they were bowled out for 130; the lowest total in a Benson & Hedges Cup final at the time. The journalist Paul Fitzpatrick suggested that Nottinghamshire had been unable "to cope with the occasion or the pressure." Marks was praised by Henry Blofeld of The Guardian for his "subtle variations of pace and flight", while Berry said that he "cleverly exploited [the Nottinghamshire batsmen's] hesitancy by giving far more flight to his off-spin than is customary in a limited-overs game." Marks finished the innings with two wickets, and conceded 24 runs, and Garner took three wickets for 13 runs.

Peter Denning and Peter Roebuck opened the innings in Somerset's chase. Denning scored 22 runs in a partnership of 27 before getting out in the ninth over, caught behind off the bowling of Mike Hendrick. Richards joined Roebuck, and according to John Woodcock of The Times, began "whacking the ball around as only he can". Nottinghamshire's captain, Rice, was criticised for the use of his bowlers; neither consistently attacking or defending. His overseas all-rounder, Hadlee, had been a doubt for the match, and bowled in obvious discomfort due to his ankle injury. Blofeld praised the bowling of the spinner, Eddie Hemmings, saying that "his lower, flatter trajectory made it almost impossible even for Richards to get at him." Somerset reached their target after 33.1 overs; 131 deliveries remained in the match, making it the shortest one-day final at the time. Both Roebuck and Richards made half-centuries, scoring 53* and 51* respectively. Marks was named as man of the match, the first time a spin bowler had won the accolade in an English domestic one-day final since Norman Gifford during the first, the 1963 Gillette Cup Final.

=== Scorecard ===
- Toss: Somerset won the toss and elected to field first
- Result: Somerset won by nine wickets

Nottinghamshire batting innings
Batsman	Method of dismissal	Runs
Paul Todd	b Joel Garner	2
Tim Robinson	c Viv Richards b Colin Dredge	13
Derek Randall	b Vic Marks	19
Basher Hassan	c Derek Taylor † b Colin Dredge	26
Clive Rice *	b Vic Marks	27
John Birch	b Hallam Moseley	7
Richard Hadlee	b Joel Garner	11
Bruce French †	c Derek Taylor † b Ian Botham	8
Eddie Hemmings	b Ian Botham	1
Kevin Cooper	b Joel Garner	3
Mike Hendrick	not out	0
Extras	(5 leg byes, 1 no ball, 7 wides)	13
Totals	(50.1 overs, 2.59 runs per over)	130

Somerset bowling
Bowler	Overs	Maidens	Runs	Wickets	Economy
Joel Garner	8.1	1	13	3	1.59
Ian Botham	9	3	19	2	2.11
Colin Dredge	11	2	35	2	3.18
Hallam Moseley	11	2	26	1	2.36
Vic Marks	11	4	24	2	2.18

Somerset batting innings
Batsman	Method of dismissal	Runs
Peter Denning	c Bruce French † b Mike Hendrick	22
Peter Roebuck	not out	53
Viv Richards	not out	51
Extras	(5 byes, 1 wide)	6
Totals	(33.1 overs, 3.97 runs per over)	132/1
Did not bat: Brian Rose, Ian Botham, Vic Marks, Nigel Popplewell, Derek Taylor, Joel Garner, Colin Dredge, Hallam Moseley

Nottinghamshire bowling
Bowler	Overs	Maidens	Runs	Wickets	Economy
Richard Hadlee	9	0	37	0	4.11
Mike Hendrick	8	1	26	1	3.25
Kevin Cooper	5.1	0	41	0	7.93
Clive Rice	6	2	11	0	1.83
Eddie Hemmings	5	0	11	0	2.20

Umpires:

- David Constant and David Evans

Key

- * – Captain
- † – Wicket-keeper
- c Fielder – Indicates that the batsman was dismissed by a catch by the named fielder
- b Bowler – Indicates which bowler gains credit for the dismissal

== Aftermath ==
Somerset were awarded £10,000 for winning the competition, while Nottinghamshire collected £4,500. Teams in the competition also collected £385 for each group stage victory, taking Somerset's earnings up to £11,155 and Nottinghamshire's to £6,040. As man of the match, Marks collected £300 prize money.

Writing for Wisden Cricketers' Almanack, Eric Hill noted that despite winning the Benson & Hedges Cup, Somerset's season was "regarded as something of a disappointment": they had been regarded as favourites in all four domestic competitions, but finished sixth in the County Championship, ninth in the John Player League, and were knocked out in the quarter-finals of the NatWest Trophy. They continued their one-day success the following season, winning the 1983 NatWest Trophy Final. Injuries to their bowlers meant that Nottinghamshire could not repeat their success from 1981; they finished fourth in the County Championship and fifth in the John Player League. They did not reach another final until the 1985 NatWest Trophy Final, which they lost to Essex, but they subsequently enjoyed one-day success by winning the 1987 NatWest Trophy and the 1989 Benson & Hedges Cup.
