= 1978 Gillette Cup final =

1978 Gillette Cup Final
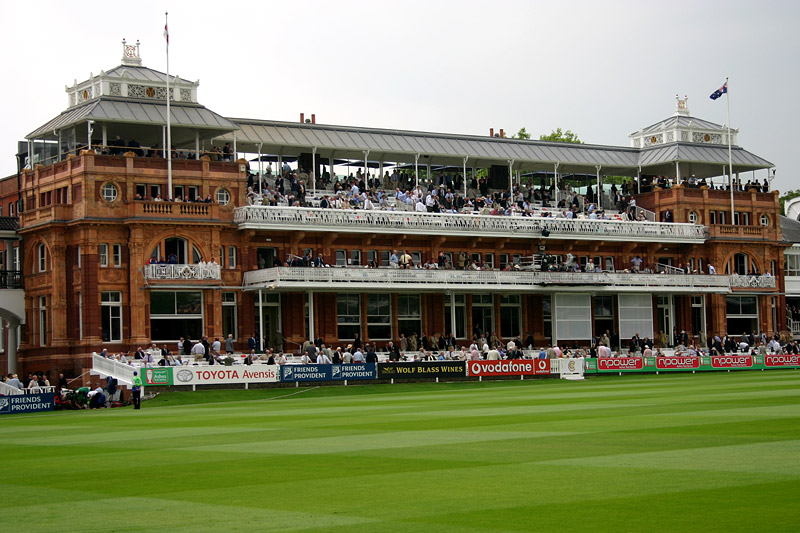
- Event: 1978 Gillette Cup
Somerset	Sussex
207/7	211/5
60 overs	53.1 overs
- Sussex won by five wickets
- Date: 2 September 1978
- Venue: Lord's, London
- Umpires: Dickie Bird and Barrie Meyer

The 1978 Gillette Cup Final was a cricket match between Somerset County Cricket Club and Sussex County Cricket Club played on 2 September 1978 at Lord's in London. It was the sixteenth final of the Gillette Cup, which had been the first domestic tournament to pit first-class cricket teams against each other in a knock-out competition. This was Sussex's sixth appearance in the final, which they had previously won twice, while Somerset had lost in their only previous final.

Both teams entered the competition in the first round; Somerset faced first-class opposition in each of the four rounds prior to the final. In their semi-final match against Essex, Somerset only progressed as they had lost fewer wickets in a tied match. Sussex played against minor counties in each of the first two rounds, but only beat Staffordshire by two runs to advance from the second round, before more straightforward victories against first-class opposition in the later stages. Somerset batted first, but with the exception of Ian Botham, the batsmen struggled to score runs fluently. They scored 207 runs for 7 wickets, of which Botham scored 80 and Viv Richards 44. Sussex began their run-chase well, with a first-wicket partnership of 93, before losing four wickets in quick succession. A second partnership, between Paul Parker and Paul Phillipson led Sussex to victory by five wickets, chasing down Somerset's total with more than six overs to spare. Parker was named as the man of the match for his score of 62 not out.

== Background ==
The Gillette Cup was first contested in 1963, as the first English domestic knock-out competition between first-class teams. Sussex had appeared in the Gillette Cup Final on five previous instances; they won the tournament in each of the first two years (1963 and 1964), and were runners-up in 1968, 1970 and 1973. In contrast, Somerset had only reached the final of the competition once previously, losing to Kent in 1967. Somerset were one of only two first-class counties in 1978 to have never won a domestic competition. Tony Greig, who had been the Sussex captain from 1973 to 1977, was released from his contract midway through the 1978 season.

== Route to the final ==
Somerset entered the tournament in the first round, in which they beat Warwickshire by six wickets, aided primarily by a score of 139 not out by Viv Richards, who was later named man of the match. In their second round match against Glamorgan, Somerset scored 330 for 4, the highest total in that year's competition. Peter Denning scored 145 runs, while Joel Garner bowled six overs and conceded just five runs. Garner's bowling was once again miserly in the quarter-final against Kent; he conceded five runs in nine overs, though Colin Dredge was named as the man of the match for his four wickets, which helped Somerset to a five-wicket victory. In the semi-final, Somerset batted first, and helped by another century from Richards, scored 287 for 6. In their response, Essex kept up with the required run rate, and needed three runs to win from the final ball of the match. The batsmen managed two runs, but Neil Smith was run out attempting the third run, and as a result the scores were tied. Somerset advanced to the final, as they had lost fewer wickets; six to ten.

Sussex also took part in the first round, facing Suffolk, one of the minor cricket counties who did not play first-class cricket. Suffolk were bowled out for 101 runs, a total which Sussex chased down with 161 deliveries remaining. Another minor county, Staffordshire, were Sussex's second round opponents, but the margin of victory was far narrower. Sussex batted first and scored 221 for 6, in which Paul Parker scored his second half-century of the competition. In their response, Staffordshire fell three runs short, finishing with 219 for 9; each of Imran Khan and Geoff Arnold collecting four wickets. In the quarter-final, Sussex faced Yorkshire. The match began on 2 August, but after 52 overs of Yorkshire's innings no further play was possible, even though the match had two reserve days. On 4 August, the match was abandoned, and replaced with a match in which each team would bat for 10 innings. In that match, Sussex batted first and scored 68 for 6, and then restricted Yorkshire to 59 for 8. Imran Khan and Arnold bowled through the entire ten overs, taking three wickets each. A more facile victory provided Sussex with their place in the final; facing Lancashire, Sussex scored 277 for 8, helped by another half-century from Parker, and 75 runs from Javed Miandad, and then bowled their opponents out for 141 runs.

== Match ==
=== Summary ===
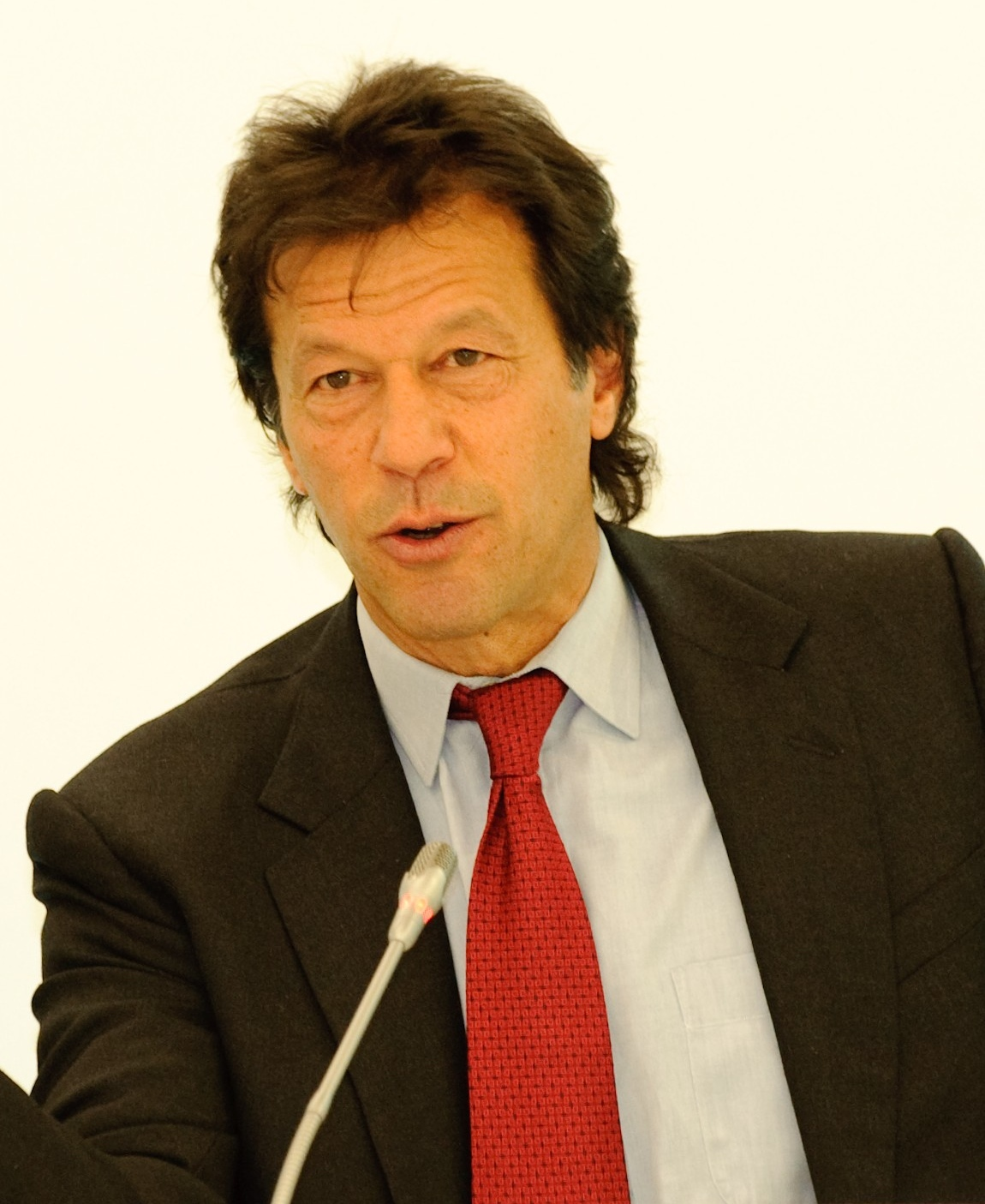
Overseas players Imran Khan (pictured) and Javed Miandad were expected to be key players for Sussex, but were overshadowed by their younger team-mates.

In his preview of the final, John Woodcock, the cricket correspondent for The Times rated Somerset as the favourites. He cited the talent of Richards as their primary asset, but asserted that they were "not a one man team". He noted that Sussex also relied upon their overseas players, Javed Miandad and Imran Khan, but that they would need to be backed up by Sussex's other players for them to have a chance of victory. The match was played at Lord's in London, as had every previous final of the competition, and play began at 10:30, with a lunch break scheduled for 12:45 to 13:25, and a 15-minute tea interval after 25 overs of the second innings.

The Sussex captain, Arnold Long, won the toss and chose to bowl first, hoping that morning dew might give his bowlers an advantage. Brian Rose scored 14 runs from the first over, bowled by Imran, who later took Somerset's first wicket, bowling Denning before the batsman had scored a run. That brought Richards to the crease, and Long immediately changed both of his bowlers, replacing the quick bowling of the openers with the slower deliveries of Giles Cheatle and John Spencer. Cheatle dismissed Rose in his first over, caught down the leg side by the wicket-keeper, Long after scoring 44 runs. Peter Roebuck also got out to Cheatle, scoring nine runs before being caught by Mendis. Botham joined Richards in the middle, and immediately scored a four with a straight drive, followed by two hooks for sixes. Cheatle and Spencer each bowled their entire allocation of 12 overs without a break, and were followed by the introduction of another slow bowler, John Barclay. Although Richards finished as the competition's leading run-scorer, Woodcock said that he struggled to score fluently, particularly against the spin bowling of Barclay and Cheatle. In the Wisden Cricketers' Almanack's summary of the season, Jack Alridge praised Long's captaincy in the final, highlighting the use of slower bowling against Richards and Ian Botham as being particularly commendable. Vic Marks, who also played in the match for Somerset, suggested that Botham was the only Somerset batsman to play with freedom, and said that the rest of the team were nervous and intimidated by the prospect of winning Somerset's first trophy. Richards scored 44 runs, and Botham 80, including three sixes, but none of the rest of the middle- or lower-order batsmen made a significant score and Somerset finished their innings on 207 for 7. Along with Barclay, Spencer bowled particularly economically for Sussex.

Sussex began their run-chase well; Barclay and Gehan Mendis scored 93 runs together, surviving a spell of attacking fast bowling from Garner and Dredge early on. Mendis had broken his thumb shortly before the final, and in the third over, it was fractured again, but he continued to bat. When Somerset did make a breakthrough, after 24 overs, they collected four wickets for the addition of seventeen runs. Mendis was the first man out, caught by Marks off the bowling of Graham Burgess, followed by Barclay who was caught hooking a delivery from Botham. Miandad was dismissed without scoring, and shortly thereafter, Imran was caught and bowled by Botham for three. Rose then chose to replace his bowlers, and against the less incisive bowling of Keith Jennings and Burgess, Parker and Paul Phillipson were able to establish a 97-run partnership, which brought Sussex to within five runs of their winning target, before Phillipson was by caught by the wicket-keeper, Derek Taylor off the bowling of Dredge. Woodcock thought that Botham in particular bowled too short against Phillipson, who he suggested would have been susceptible to a yorker. In Wisden, Eric Hill opined that Botham's short-pitched bowling, which was a feature of his play late in the season, was due to him being overused by England and Somerset through the year. Parker scored the winning runs to secure a five-wicket victory for Sussex with 41 deliveries remaining.

=== Scorecard ===
Somerset County Cricket Club batting innings
Batsman	Method of dismissal	Runs
Brian Rose *	c Long b Cheatle	30
Peter Denning	b Imran Khan	0
Viv Richards	c Arnold b Barclay	44
Peter Roebuck	c Mendis b Cheatle	9
Ian Botham	b Imran Khan	80
Vic Marks	c Arnold b Barclay	4
Graham Burgess	run out	3
Derek Taylor †	not out	13
Joel Garner	not out	8
Keith Jennings	did not bat	–
Colin Dredge	did not bat	–
Extras	(10 leg-byes, 6 no-balls)	16
Totals	(60 overs)	207/7

Sussex County Cricket Club bowling
Bowler	Overs	Maidens	Runs	Wickets	Economy
Imran Khan	12	1	50	2	4.17
Geoff Arnold	12	2	43	0	3.58
John Spencer	12	3	27	0	2.25
Giles Cheatle	12	3	50	2	4.17
John Barclay	12	3	21	2	1.75

Sussex County Cricket Club batting innings
Batsman	Method of dismissal	Runs
John Barclay	c Roebuck b Botham	44
Gehan Mendis	c Marks b Burgess	44
Paul Parker	not out	62
Javed Miandad	c Taylor b Garner	0
Imran Khan	c and b Botham	3
Paul Phillipson	c Taylor b Dredge	32
Stewart Storey	not out	0
Arnold Long * †	did not bat	–
John Spencer	did not bat	–
Geoff Arnold	did not bat	–
Giles Cheatle	did not bat	–
Extras	(1 byes, 9 leg-byes, 9 no-balls, 7 wides)	26
Totals	(53.1 overs)	211/5

Somerset County Cricket Club bowling
Bowler	Overs	Maidens	Runs	Wickets	Economy
Joel Garner	12	3	34	1	2.83
Colin Dredge	10	2	26	1	2.60
Ian Botham	12	1	65	2	5.42
Keith Jennings	9	1	29	0	3.22
Graham Burgess	10	2	27	1	2.70
Peter Denning	0.1	0	4	0	24.00

Umpires:

- Dickie Bird and Barrie Meyer

== Post-match ==
Parker was selected as the man of the match by Ken Barrington. Somerset, who had started the weekend with the potential of winning both the Gillette Cup and the John Player League, returned to their home ground in Taunton needing to avoid defeat against Essex to guarantee winning the latter competition. They lost by two runs, prompting Alan Gibson of The Times to write "So we are saying, as we have said at the end of so many seasons, 'well tried Somerset', and no more than that." Somerset returned to the final in 1979, when they beat Northamptonshire to win their first trophy. Sussex did not reach the final again until 1986, though they won the 1982 John Player League in the interim.

== Bibliography ==
- Marks, Vic (1984). Somerset County Cricket Scrapbook. London: Souvenir Press Ltd. ISBN 0-285-62631-0.
- Preston, Norman, ed. (1979). Wisden Cricketers' Almanack 1979 (116 ed.). London: Macdonald and Jane's. ISBN 0-354-09080-1.
