= 1981 Benson & Hedges Cup final =

1981 Benson & Hedges Cup Final
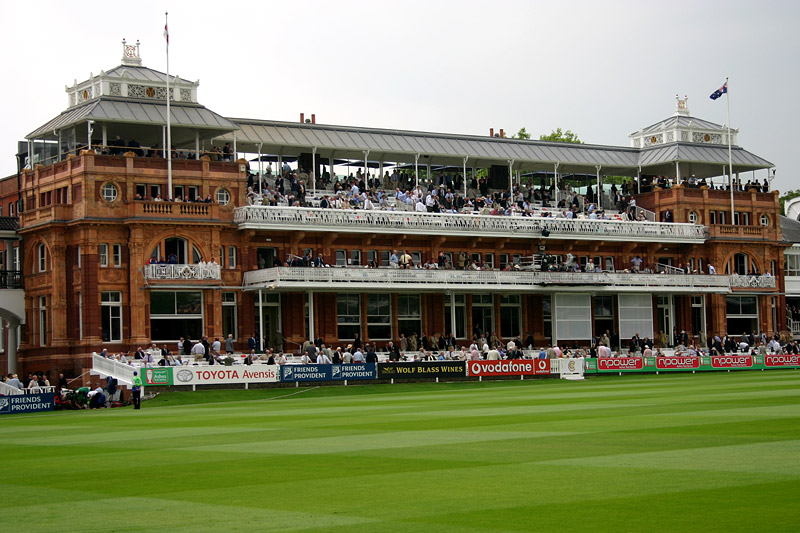
- The final was played at Lord's
- Event: 1981 Benson & Hedges Cup
Surrey	Somerset
194/8	197/3
55 overs	44.3 overs
- Somerset won by seven wickets
- Date: 25 July 1981
- Venue: Lord's, London
- Man of the match: Viv Richards (Somerset)
- Umpires: Dickie Bird and Barrie Meyer
- Attendance: 21,130

The 1981 Benson & Hedges Cup Final was a one-day cricket match between Surrey County Cricket Club and Somerset County Cricket Club played on 25 July 1981 at Lord's in London. It was the tenth final of the Benson & Hedges Cup. Surrey had previously won the tournament in 1974, and were losing finalists in 1979. It was Somerset's debut appearance in the competition's final, though they had twice appeared in the final of England's other one-day tournament, the Gillette Cup.

After winning the toss, Somerset captain Brian Rose opted to bowl first. Surrey scored 194 runs from their full allocation of 55 overs, during which their captain, Roger Knight, top-scored, with 92 runs. Somerset's West Indian bowler Joel Garner was particularly miserly, taking five wickets and allowing just fourteen runs from his eleven overs. In their response, Somerset lost both openers cheaply, but another West Indian, Viv Richards, dominated the batting and scored 132 not out to help Somerset ease to a seven-wicket victory with more than ten overs remaining. Somerset claimed their maiden Benson & Hedges Cup title, and Richards was named as man of the match.

== Background ==
The Benson & Hedges Cup was established in 1972; the third one-day cricket tournament in England, after the Gillette Cup (established in 1963) and the John Player League (established in 1969). It was considered less prestigious than the Gillette Cup; ESPNcricinfo described it as "the League Cup final to the Gillette's FA Cup". Surrey County Cricket Club had twice previously reached the Benson & Hedges Cup Final; they won the competition in 1974, and were runners-up in 1979. Surrey had also finished as runners-up in the 1980 Gillette Cup Final. Somerset County Cricket Club had never previously appeared in the Benson & Hedges Cup Final. In the 1979 tournament, Somerset had tried to manipulate their way out of the group stage by declaring after one over of their match against Worcestershire. As a result, Somerset were disqualified from that year's competition. They subsequently won both the 1979 Gillette Cup Final and the 1979 John Player League.

== Route to the final ==
Somerset played in Group C, alongside Essex, Glamorgan, Kent and a combined Oxford & Cambridge Universities team. After losing their opening match to Essex by 38 runs, they won their remaining three matches to qualify second in their group. They were level on points with Kent in first, but trailed them by bowling strike rate. Somerset travelled to Yorkshire in the quarter-finals. After restricting their opponents to 221 runs, half-centuries from both openers, Brian Rose and Peter Denning, helped Somerset to a three-wicket victory. In their semi-final, Somerset hosted Kent, and put in an all-round good bowling performance to dismiss them for 154. Peter Roebuck scored an unbeaten half-century, but Somerset were propelled to victory by a quick 42 from Nigel Popplewell at the end of the innings.

In Group D, Surrey faced Hampshire, Middlesex, a combined Minor Counties team and Sussex. The group matches suffered badly from the weather; four of the ten games had no result. Surrey lost their opening match to Sussex, and then had wash-outs against both Hampshire and Middlesex. A victory over the Minor Counties, allied with results elsewhere going their way, saw Surrey progress to the quarter-finals second in their group. Surrey batted first against Nottinghamshire in their quarter-final, and 70 runs from Roger Knight helped them score 226, and go on to win by 47 runs. Hosting Leicestershire in the semi-finals, Surrey once again batted first, and scored 191. In a tight match, they bowled Leicestershire out for 188, three runs short of victory, with one ball remaining, to secure their place in the final.

== Match ==
=== Summary ===
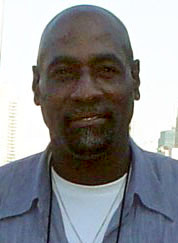
Viv Richards earned the man of the match accolade, top-scoring with 132* runs for Somerset

The final was played in front of a crowd of 21,130 people at Lord's on 25 July. Somerset captain Rose won the toss on an overcast morning and chose to field first. Heavy rain in the week leading up to the match meant that the outfield was slow, making scoring difficult early in the day. Surrey started slowly; after the first ten overs they were seven for one, (Note: "Seven for one" is cricket shorthand which indicates that the batting team had scored seven runs and lost one wicket.) having lost Jack Richards. They added another eight runs in the next eight overs, and lost their other opener, Grahame Clinton. Somerset's bowlers were partly credited for the start; Ian Botham was extracting a lot of swing from some of his deliveries, while the Times journalist John Woodcock praised Joel Garner as being "notoriously difficult to get away". Geoff Howarth, one of Surrey's overseas players, was described as "out of form" in the Wisden Cricketers' Almanack summary of the match, and scored 16 runs. Early in his innings, the Surrey captain Knight struggled against Somerset's fast-medium pace bowlers; he frequently missed balls which passed outside his off stump, but he settled in against the slower bowlers, and scored 92 runs before being caught behind off the bowling of Garner. In all, Garner collected five wickets; four of them coming towards the end of the innings. He also conceded fourteen runs from his eleven overs, the best economy rate of any bowler in the match; Scyld Berry of The Observer described him as "the world's most dangerous bowler in the one-day game". Monte Lynch and Sylvester Clarke both batted more aggressively for Surrey in the afternoon, when the sun helped make scoring a little easier, but neither batted long enough to make a significant impact on the score: Lynch struck a six and two fours during his 22, while Clarke scored 15 before being caught by a diving effort from Popplewell. Surrey completed their 55 overs on 194 for eight, setting Somerset a target of 195 runs to win.

In their response, Somerset lost both openers cheaply within the first three overs; Rose scored five, while Denning was dismissed without scoring. This brought Richards and Roebuck to the crease. The loss of the early wickets meant that Richards had to play carefully initially; former England international Len Hutton noted that sometimes Richards had a tendency to get over ambitious, and "gets himself out", but he successfully negotiated the early aggressive bowling from Clarke. Roebuck played a secondary role; allowing Richards to do the majority of the batting. The pair put on a century partnership before Roebuck was dismissed for 22 off the bowling of Knight. Botham then joined Richards in the middle, and the two batted with freedom, untroubled by the Surrey bowling. Richards did not stop when he reached his century, and remained 132 not out when Somerset reached their target, with seven wickets and 63 balls remaining. Richards was named as man of the match for his performance, which Berry described as "the only batting that rose above a subdued occasion". Richards' score of 132 not out, and Garner's bowling figures of five for 14 were both records in a Benson & Hedges Cup final.

=== Scorecard ===
- Toss: Somerset won the toss and elected to field first
- Result: Somerset won by seven wickets

Surrey batting innings
Batsman	Method of dismissal	Runs
Grahame Clinton	c Peter Roebuck b Vic Marks	6
Jack Richards †	b Joel Garner	1
Roger Knight *	c Derek Taylor † b Joel Garner	92
Geoff Howarth	c Peter Roebuck b Vic Marks	16
Monte Lynch	c Joel Garner b Nigel Popplewell	22
David Smith	b Joel Garner	7
Sylvester Clarke	c Nigel Popplewell b Joel Garner	15
Graham Roope	not out	14
David Thomas	b Joel Garner	0
Robin Jackman	not out	2
Extras	(2 byes, 14 leg byes, 1 no-ball, 2 wides)	19
Totals	(55 overs, 3.52 runs per over)	194/8
Did not bat: Pat Pocock

Somerset bowling
Bowler	Overs	Maidens	Runs	Wickets	Economy
Joel Garner	11	5	14	5	1.27
Ian Botham	11	2	44	0	4.00
Colin Dredge	11	0	48	0	4.36
Vic Marks	11	5	24	2	2.18
Nigel Popplewell	11	0	45	1	4.09

Somerset batting innings
Batsman	Method of dismissal	Runs
Brian Rose *	b Robin Jackman	5
Peter Denning	b Sylvester Clarke	0
Viv Richards	not out	132
Peter Roebuck	c David Smith b Roger Knight	22
Ian Botham	not out	37
Extras	(1 no-ball)	1
Totals	(44.3 overs, 4.42 runs per over)	197/3
Did not bat: Nigel Popplewell, Vic Marks, Dennis Breakwell, Joel Garner, Derek Taylor, Colin Dredge

Surrey bowling
Bowler	Overs	Maidens	Runs	Wickets	Economy
Sylvester Clarke	8	1	24	1	3.00
Robin Jackman	11	1	53	1	4.81
David Thomas	5.3	0	32	0	5.81
Pat Pocock	11	1	46	0	4.18
Roger Knight	9	0	41	1	4.55

Umpires:

- Dickie Bird and Barrie Meyer

Key

- * – Captain
- † – Wicket-keeper
- c Fielder – Indicates that the batsman was dismissed by a catch by the named fielder
- b Bowler – Indicates which bowler gains credit for the dismissal

== Aftermath ==
Somerset were awarded £8,500 for winning the competition, while Surrey collected £3,500. Teams in the competition also collected £350 for each group stage victory, taking Somerset's earnings up to £9,550 and Surrey's to £3,850. As man of the match, Richards collected £300 prize money. (Note: Adjusting for inflation, in 2025 terms, Somerset's total earnings were approximately £37,000, Surrey's £15,000, and Richards' £1,200. UK Retail Price Index inflation figures are based on data from Clark, Gregory (2019). "The Annual RPI and Average Earnings for Britain, 1209 to Present (New Series)". MeasuringWorth. Retrieved 14 November 2019.)

Clarke, who played through injury for Surrey in the final, missed most of the remainder of the season for Surrey. Wisden partly attributed Surrey's late season struggles to his injury; appearing in the Benson & Hedges Cup final was the highlight of their season. In contrast, Wisden said that "Somerset's story of success continued resoundingly in 1981". Along with their Benson & Hedges Cup victory, they finished second in the John Player League and third in the County Championship. Somerset won the competition again in 1982, beating Nottinghamshire by nine wickets in the final. Surrey did not reach the final again until 1997.
