= 1981 Benson & Hedges Cup =

- Administrator: Test and County Cricket Board
- Cricket format: Limited overs cricket (55 overs per innings)
- Champions: Somerset (1st title)
- Participants: 20
- Matches: 47
- Most runs: 313 Chris Balderstone (Leicestershire)
- Most wickets: 16 Joel Garner (Somerset)

The 1981 Benson & Hedges Cup was the tenth edition of cricket's Benson & Hedges Cup.

The competition was won by Somerset County Cricket Club.

== Fixtures and results ==
=== Group stage ===
==== Group A ====
Team	Pld	W	L	NR	A	Pts	BowSR
Nottinghamshire	4	4	0	0	0	8	35.472
Leicestershire	4	2	1	1	0	5	40.952
Northamptonshire	4	1	1	1	1	4	34.095
Gloucestershire	4	1	2	0	1	3	38.480
Worcestershire	4	0	4	0	0	0	69.722

==== Group B ====
Team	Pld	W	L	NR	A	Pts	BowSR
Yorkshire	4	3	0	0	1	7	34.500
Warwickshire	4	2	1	1	0	5	34.900
Derbyshire	4	2	1	1	0	5	36.731
Lancashire	4	1	2	0	1	3	46.900
Scotland	4	0	4	0	0	0	61.500

==== Group C ====
Team	Pld	W	L	NR	A	Pts	BowSR
Kent	4	3	1	0	0	6	29.824
Somerset	4	3	1	0	0	6	41.094
Essex	4	2	2	0	0	4	37.871
Glamorgan	4	1	2	0	1	3	26.875
Oxford and Cambridge Universities	4	0	3	0	1	1	72.000

==== Group D ====
Team	Pld	W	L	NR	A	Pts	BowSR
Sussex	4	3	0	0	1	7	29.259
Surrey	4	1	1	2	0	4	36.889
Minor Counties	4	1	2	0	1	3	31.600
Middlesex	4	0	1	1	2	3	36.333
Hampshire	4	1	2	1	0	3	40.958

=== Quarter-finals ===
24, 25, 26 June 1981
(scorecard)

Kent; 193/8 (50 overs)	v	Warwickshire; 179 all out (49.1 overs)
Chris Tavaré 76; Anton Ferreira 3/38 (10 overs)		Andy Lloyd 60; John Shepherd 3/24 (10 overs)

Kent won by 14 runs
Kennington Oval, London
Umpires: Sam Cook & Tom Spencer
Player of the match: Chris Tavaré (Kent)

- No play on scheduled day or first reserve day. The match was moved from Canterbury to The Oval on the third day as the former was waterlogged

24 June 1981
(scorecard)

Surrey; 226/7 (55 overs)	v	Nottinghamshire; 179 all out (49.4 overs)
Roger Knight 70; Clive Rice 2/32 (11 overs)		Derek Randall 62; Robin Jackman 4/24 (9.4 overs)

Surrey won by 47 runs
Trent Bridge, Nottingham
Umpires: Ron Aspinall & Ken Palmer
Player of the match: Roger Knight (Surrey)

24, 25 June 1981
(scorecard)

Sussex; 196/9 (55 overs)	v	Leicestershire; 199/6 (54.1 overs)
Paul Phillipson 59; Gordon Parsons 2/22 (10 overs)		Chris Balderstone 67; John Barclay 3/34 (11 overs)

Leicestershire won by 4 wickets
County Ground, Hove
Umpires: David Evans & Roy Palmer
Player of the match: Paul Phillipson (Sussex)

- Reserve day used. Sussex were 84/5 (28 overs) at the close of the first day's play

24 June 1981
(scorecard)

Yorkshire; 221/9 (55 overs)	v	Somerset; 223/7 (53.5 overs)
John Hampshire 58; Joel Garner 3/33 (11 overs)		Brian Rose 68; Neil Hartley 2/33 (11 overs)

Somerset won by 3 wickets
Headingley, Leeds
Umpires: David Halfyard & Don Oslear
Player of the match: Brian Rose (Somerset)

=== Semi-finals ===
8 July 1981
(scorecard)

Kent; 154 all out (52.1 overs)	v	Somerset; 157/5 (48.3 overs)
Chris Tavaré 44; Ian Botham 3/23 (10 overs)		Peter Roebuck 51*; Derek Underwood 2/15 (11 overs)

Somerset won by 5 wickets
County Ground, Taunton
Umpires: Arthur Jepson & Ray Julian
Player of the match: Nigel Popplewell (Somerset)

8 July 1981
(scorecard)

Surrey; 191/9 (55 overs)	v	Leicestershire; 188 all out (54.5 overs)
Graham Roope 55*; Andy Roberts 2/27 (11 overs)		John Steele 39; Ian Payne 3/20 (11 overs)

Surrey won by 3 runs
Kennington Oval, London
Umpires: Bill Alley & Peter Wight
Player of the match: Ian Payne (Surrey)

=== Final ===
25 July 1981
(scorecard)

Surrey; 194/8 (55 overs)	v	Somerset; 197/3 (44.3 overs)
Roger Knight 92; Joel Garner 5/14 (11 overs)		Viv Richards 132*; Sylvester Clarke 1/24 (8 overs)

Somerset won by 7 wickets
Lord's, London
Umpires: Dickie Bird & Barrie Meyer
Player of the match: Viv Richards (Somerset)

== See also ==
Benson & Hedges Cup
