= Simon Daniels (cricketer) =

English cricketer

Personal information
- Full name: Simon Antony Brewis Daniels
- Born: 23 August 1958 (age 68); Darlington, County Durham, England
- Height: 5 ft 9 in (1.75 m)
- Batting: Right-handed
- Bowling: Right-arm fast-medium

Domestic team information
- Years: Team
- 1983: Durham
- 1981–1982: Glamorgan
- 1979–1980: Durham

Career statistics
Competition	First-class	List A
Matches	16	11
Runs scored	227	8
Batting average	17.46	4.00
100s/50s	0/1	0/0
Top score	73	4*
Balls bowled	1,874	497
Wickets	28	4
Bowling average	41.53	99.50
5 wickets in innings	0	0
10 wickets in match	0
Best bowling	3/33	3/32
Catches/stumpings	7/–	3/–
- Source: Cricinfo, 12 September 2011

Simon Antony Brewis Daniels (born 23 August 1958) is a former English cricketer. Daniels was a right-handed batsman who bowled right-arm fast-medium. Born in Darlington, County Durham, he was educated at Sedbergh School and at Newcastle Polytechnic.

Daniels made his debut for Durham in the 1979 Minor Counties Championship against Cheshire. He made fourteen Minor Counties Championship appearances up to the 1980 season. In 1980 he made his List A debut for the county against Nottinghamshire in the Gillette Cup, a match in which he went wicket-less in the 12 overs he bowled, conceding 32 runs.

He joined Glamorgan for the 1981 season, making his first-class debut against Middlesex in the County Championship. He made fifteen further first-class appearances for Glamorgan, the last of which came against Essex in the 1982 County Championship. In his sixteen first-class matches, he scored 227 runs at an average of 17.46, with a high score of 73. This score, which was his only first-class fifty, came against Gloucestershire in 1982. This score also came during his record partnership for the 10th wicket in which himself and Terry Davies compiled 143 runs, which remains a Glamorgan record for the 10th wicket. With the ball, he took 28 wickets at a bowling average of 41.53, with best figures of 3/33. His first List A appearance for Glamorgan also came in 1981, against Middlesex in the John Player League. He made eight further appearances in that format for the county, the last of which came against Essex in the 1982 John Player League. He took just 4 wickets in his nine matches, which came at an average of 75.50, with best figures of 3/32.

He left Glamorgan at the end of the 1982 season, returning to Durham for the following season. He made just a single appearance in that season's Minor Counties Championship against Northumberland, as well as a single List A match in the NatWest Trophy against Lancashire, a match in which Daniels again failed to take a wicket, conceding 64 runs from 12 overs.
