= List of final appearances by Somerset County Cricket Club =

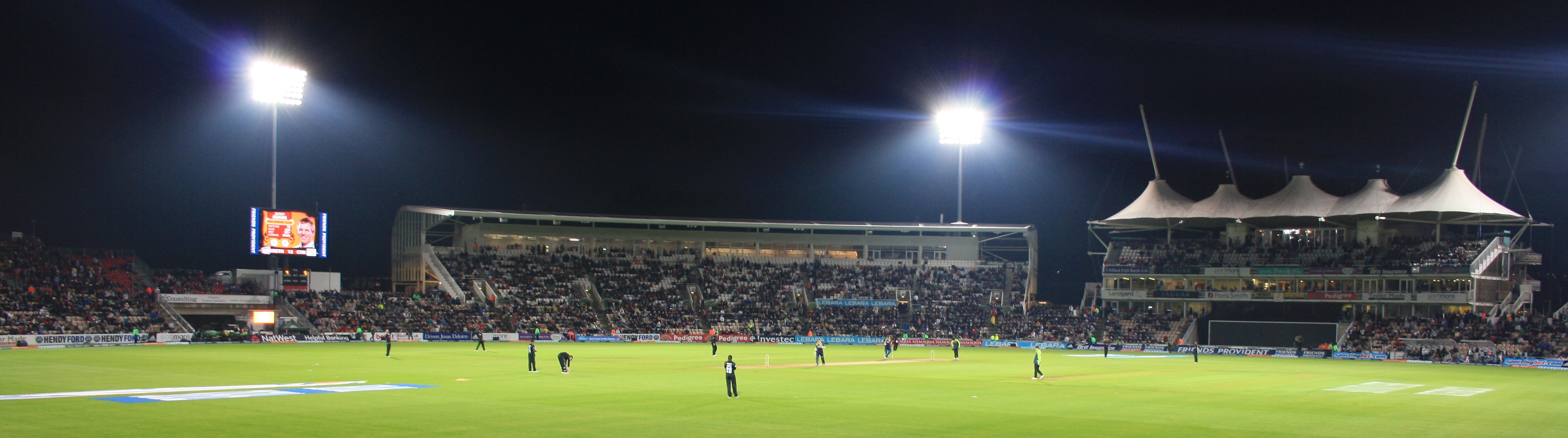
The Rose Bowl, under floodlights, for the final of the 2010 Friends Provident t20, which Somerset lost.

Somerset County Cricket Club have played first-class cricket continuously since 1891, and limited overs cricket since its introduction in 1963. English domestic cricket only ever staged finals in limited overs competitions prior to the abridged 2020 season: the first being the 1963 Gillette Cup Final. Somerset reached their first final in 1967, losing to Kent in the same competition. In total, Somerset have appeared in 22 finals, of which they won nine and lost 13. Their first victory came in the 1979 Gillette Cup Final, which was followed by three more victories in the following four years. After winning the 1983 NatWest Trophy Final, Somerset did not appear in another final until 1999, when they lost to Yorkshire in the same competition.

After winning four of their first six finals, Somerset have only won five of their 16 since. The club finished as runners-up in both domestic finals in each of 2010, 2011 and 2024, losing the Friends Provident t20 in 2010 courtesy of having lost more wickets after the match was tied.

== Finals ==
No.	Season	Competition	Date	Opponents	Venue	Result	Ref
1	1967	Gillette Cup	2 September 1967	Kent	Lord's, London	Lost by 32 runs	
2	1978	Gillette Cup	2 September 1978	Sussex	Lord's, London	Lost by 5 wickets	
3	1979	Gillette Cup	8 September 1979	Northamptonshire	Lord's, London	Won by 45 runs	
4	1981	Benson & Hedges Cup	25 July 1981	Surrey	Lord's, London	Won by 7 wickets	
5	1982	Benson & Hedges Cup	24 July 1982	Nottinghamshire	Lord's, London	Won by 9 wickets	
6	1983	NatWest Trophy	3 September 1983	Kent	Lord's, London	Won by 24 runs	
7	1999	NatWest Trophy	29 August 1999	Gloucestershire	Lord's, London	Lost by 50 runs	
8	2001	Cheltenham & Gloucester Trophy	1 September 2001	Leicestershire	Lord's, London	Won by 41 runs	
9	2002	Cheltenham & Gloucester Trophy	31 August 2002	Yorkshire	Lord's, London	Lost by 6 wickets	
10	2005	Twenty20 Cup	30 July 2005	Lancashire	The Oval, London	Won by 7 wickets	
11	2009	Twenty20 Cup	15 August 2009	Sussex	Edgbaston, Birmingham	Lost by 63 runs	
12	2010	Friends Provident t20	14 August 2010	Hampshire	The Rose Bowl, Southampton	Lost by losing more wickets	
13	2010	Clydesdale Bank 40	18 September 2010	Warwickshire	Lord's, London	Lost by 3 wickets	
14	2011	Friends Life t20	27 August 2011	Leicestershire	Edgbaston, Birmingham	Lost by 18 runs	
15	2011	Clydesdale Bank 40	18 September 2011	Surrey	Lord's, London	Lost by 5 wickets	
16	2019	Royal London One-Day Cup	25 May 2019	Hampshire	Lord's, London	Won by 6 wickets	
17	2020	Bob Willis Trophy	23–27 September 2020	Essex	Lord's, London	Match drawn (Essex won on 1st innings)	
18	2021	Vitality T20 Blast	18 September 2021	Kent	Edgbaston, Birmingham	Lost by 25 runs	
19	2023	T20 Blast	15 July 2023	Essex	Edgbaston, Birmingham	Won by 14 runs	
20	2024	T20 Blast	14 September 2024	Gloucestershire	Edgbaston, Birmingham	Lost by 8 wickets	
21	2024	One-Day Cup	22–23 September 2024	Glamorgan	Trent Bridge, Nottingham	Lost by 15 runs	
22	2025	T20 Blast	13 September 2025	Hampshire	Edgbaston, Birmingham	Won by 6 wickets	
