= 1982 Benson & Hedges Cup =

Eleventh edition of cricket's Benson & Hedges Cup held in 1982 in Australia

- Administrator: Test and County Cricket Board
- Cricket format: Limited overs cricket (55 overs per innings)
- Champions: Somerset (1st title)
- Participants: 20
- Matches: 47
- Most runs: 317 Neil Taylor (Kent)
- Most wickets: 19 Colin Croft (Lancashire)

The 1982 Benson & Hedges Cup was the eleventh edition of cricket's Benson & Hedges Cup.

The competition was won by Somerset County Cricket Club.

== Fixtures and results ==
=== Group stage ===
==== Group A ====
Team	Pld	W	L	NR	A	Pts	BowSR
Derbyshire	4	3	1	0	0	6	38.559
Leicestershire	4	3	1	0	0	6	44.000
Worcestershire	4	2	2	0	0	4	45.750
Minor Counties	4	1	3	0	0	2	39.846
Yorkshire	4	1	3	0	0	0	53.217

==== Group B ====
Team	Pld	W	L	NR	A	Pts	BowSR
Nottinghamshire	4	4	0	0	0	8	34.703
Lancashire	4	3	1	0	0	6	31.211
Warwickshire	4	2	2	0	0	4	39.667
Northamptonshire	4	1	3	0	0	2	47.783
Scotland	4	0	4	0	0	0	98.667

==== Group C ====
Team	Pld	W	L	NR	A	Pts	BowSR
Kent	4	3	1	0	0	6	35.806
Sussex	4	3	1	0	0	6	37.969
Essex	4	2	2	0	0	4	39.194
Surrey	4	2	2	0	0	4	42.226
Hampshire	4	0	4	0	0	0	37.457

==== Group D ====
Team	Pld	W	L	NR	A	Pts	BowSR
Middlesex	4	4	0	0	0	8	37.581
Somerset	4	3	1	0	0	6	38.226
Gloucestershire	4	2	2	0	0	4	43.733
Glamorgan	4	1	3	0	0	2	36.581
Oxford and Cambridge Universities	4	0	4	0	0	0	88.917

=== Quarter-finals ===
16 June 1982
(scorecard)

Derbyshire; 190 all out (55 overs)	v	Sussex; 194/6 (53.5 overs)
Peter Kirsten 60; Ian Greig 2/33 (11 overs)		Paul Parker 72; Steve Oldham 2/30 (10 overs)

Sussex won by 4 wickets
County Ground, Derby
Umpires: Dickie Bird & Arthur Jepson
Player of the match: Paul Parker (Sussex)

16 June 1982
(scorecard)

Kent; 207 all out (54.2 overs)	v	Somerset; 208/7 (54.4 overs)
Neil Taylor 121; Ian Botham 4/52 (11 overs)		Brian Rose 52; Kevin Jarvis 3/44 (11 overs)

Somerset won by 3 wickets
St Lawrence Ground, Canterbury
Umpires: David Shepherd & Peter Wight
Player of the match: Neil Taylor (Kent)

16 June 1982
(scorecard)

Lancashire; 191/9 (55 overs)	v	Middlesex; 139 all out (48 overs)
Clive Lloyd 66; Wayne Daniel 2/32 (11 overs)		Clive Radley 66; Ian Folley 4/18 (10 overs)

Lancashire won by 52 runs
Lord's, London
Umpires: Roy Palmer & Alan Whitehead
Player of the match: Clive Lloyd (Lancashire)

16, 17 June 1982
(scorecard)

Nottinghamshire; 156 all out (53.4 overs)	v	Leicestershire; 154/9 (55 overs)
Basher Hassan 48; Les Taylor 3/45 (10.4 overs)		David Gower 34; Michael Bore 3/21 (11 overs)

Nottinghamshire won by 2 runs
Trent Bridge, Nottingham
Umpires: Bill Alley & Barrie Meyer
Player of the match: Gordon Parsons (Leicestershire)

- Reserve day used. Leicestershire were 118/7 (47 overs) at the close of the first day's play

=== Semi-finals ===
30 June 1982
(scorecard)

Lancashire; 182 all out (54.4 overs)	v	Nottinghamshire; 184/6 (53.1 overs)
Chris Maynard 60; Kevin Saxelby 3/51 (11 overs)		Richard Hadlee 55; Colin Croft 3/33 (10.1 overs)

Nottinghamshire won by 4 wickets
Trent Bridge, Nottingham
Umpires: Lloyd Budd & Ken Palmer
Player of the match: Richard Hadlee (Nottinghamshire)

30 June 1982
(scorecard)

Sussex; 110 all out (41.1 overs)	v	Somerset; 112/2 (36.1 overs)
Garth le Roux 46; Joel Garner 4/24 (9.1 overs)		Peter Denning 68*; Allan Green 1/4 (3 overs)

Somerset won by 8 wickets
County Ground, Taunton
Umpires: Ray Julian & Don Oslear
Player of the match: Joel Garner (Somerset)

=== Final ===
24 July 1982
(scorecard)

Nottinghamshire; 130 all out (50.1 overs)	v	Somerset; 132/1 (33.1 overs)
Clive Rice 27; Joel Garner 3/13 (8.1 overs)		Peter Roebuck 53*; Mike Hendrick 1/26 (8 overs)

Somerset won by 9 wickets
Lord's, London
Umpires: David Constant & David Evans
Player of the match: Vic Marks (Somerset)

== See also ==
Benson & Hedges Cup
