= List of Glamorgan first-class cricket records =

This is a list of Glamorgan first-class cricket records; that is, record team and individual performances in first-class cricket for Glamorgan. Records for Glamorgan in List A cricket, the shorter form of the game, are found at List of Glamorgan List A cricket records.

== Team records ==
	Total Runs	Opponents	Venue	Season
Highest for Glamorgan	795-5 d	v Leicestershire	Leicester	2022
Highest against Glamorgan	712	by Northamptonshire	Northampton	1998
Lowest for Glamorgan	22	v Lancashire	Liverpool	1924
Lowest against Glamorgan	33	by Leicestershire	Ebbw Vale	1965
Source: CricketArchive. Last updated: 23 May 2007.

== Batting records ==
	Runs	Batsman	Opponents	Venue	Season
Highest individual innings	410*	(England) Sam Northeast	v Leicestershire	Leicester	2022
Most runs in a season for Glamorgan	2,276	(England) Hugh Morris			1990
Most runs in a career for Glamorgan	34,056	(England) Alan Jones			1957–1983
Source: CricketArchive. Last updated: 23 May 2007.

== Bowling records ==
	Analysis	Bowler	Opponents	Venue	Season
Best innings analysis for Glamorgan	10/51	(England) Jack Mercer	v Worcestershire	Worcester	1936
Best match analysis for Glamorgan	17/212	(England) Johnnie Clay	v Worcestershire	Swansea	1937
	Wickets	Bowler	Season		
Most wickets in a season for Glamorgan	176	(England) Johnnie Clay	1937		
Most career wickets for Glamorgan	2,174	(Wales) Don Shepherd	1950–1972		
Source: CricketArchive. Last updated: 23 May 2007.

== Partnership records ==
Wicket Partnership	Runs	Batsmen	Opponents	Venue	Season
1st	374	(Australia) Matthew Elliott (England) Steve James	v Sussex	Colwyn Bay	2000`
2nd	328	(Zimbabwe) Eddie Byrom (South Africa) Colin Ingram	v Sussex	Cardiff	2022
3rd	313	(Wales) Emrys Davies (Wales) Willie Jones	v Essex	Brentwood	1948
4th	425*	(South Africa) Adrian Dale (Antigua and Barbuda) Viv Richards	v Middlesex	Cardiff	1993
5th	307*	(Wales) Kiran Carlson (South Africa) Chris Cooke	v Northamptonshire	Cardiff	2021
6th	461*	(England) Sam Northeast (South Africa) Chris Cooke	v Leicestershire	Leicester	2022
7th	211	(Wales) Tony Cottey (Cricket West Indies) Ottis Gibson	v Leicestershire	Swansea	1996
8th	211	(South Africa) Chris Cooke (Australia) Michael Neser	v Leicestershire	Leicester	2023
9th	203*	(England) Joe Hills (Wales) Johnnie Clay	v Worcestershire	Swansea	1929
10th	143	(England) Terry Davies (England) Simon Daniels	v Gloucestershire	Swansea	1982
Source: https://stats.espncricinfo.com/zimbabwe/engine/records/fow/highest_partnerships_by_wicket.html?class=4;id=1080;type=team. Last updated: 22 September 2021
