= Michael Bore =

English cricketer

Mike Bore
Personal information
- Full name: Michael Kenneth Bore
- Born: 2 June 1947; Kingston upon Hull, East Riding of Yorkshire, England
- Died: 2 May 2017 (aged 69)
- Nickname: Noddy
- Height: 5 ft 11 in (1.80 m)
- Batting: Right-handed
- Bowling: Left-arm medium

Domestic team information
- Years: Team
- 1969–1977: Yorkshire
- 1977–1988: Nottinghamshire

Career statistics
Competition	FC	LA
Matches	159	147
Runs scored	874	175
Batting average	8.24	7.00
100s/50s	0/0	0/0
Top score	37*	28*
Balls bowled	27,649	6,942
Wickets	372	139
Bowling average	30.22	30.05
5 wickets in innings	9	1
10 wickets in match	0	0
Best bowling	8/89	6/22
Catches/stumpings	51/–	37/–
- Source: ESPN Cricinfo, 3 May 2017

Michael Kenneth Bore (2 June 1947 – 2 May 2017) was an English right-handed batsman and left arm medium pace bowler from Kingston upon Hull, who played county cricket for Yorkshire and Nottinghamshire.

== Career ==
He played his early cricket with Hull Town C.C., before getting into the Yorkshire Federation side in 1966. He played with Leeds C.C., taking 9–21 versus Doncaster in 1968, and from 1969 assisted Bradford, taking 7–9 against Bowling Old Lane in 1970 and helped them win the Priestley Cup in 1973.

Bore made his debut for Yorkshire in 1969. He played for his native county until 1977, when he moved to Nottinghamshire where he played past the age of 40 until 1988. A doughty campaigner on the county circuit he took 372 first-class wickets at 30.22. His best figures were 8–89 in a loss to Kent at Folkestone in 1979. He conceded 2.43 runs per over, bowling a mixture of accurate swing and seam. He also took 139 wickets in one day cricket.

Bore was a noted rabbit with the bat, with an average of only 8.24 over 158 innings. His highest score was 37 not out in the first innings against Nottinghamshire at Bradford in 1973: Bore came in with the score 111 for 9 and shared a partnership of 108 runs with opener Geoffrey Boycott, before Boycott was run out for 129.

One of the few instances of an all run six occurred off Bore's bowling in a Surrey v Yorkshire Sunday League match at the large Oval ground in 1974. Robin Jackman cut Mike Bore to the third man boundary where the fielder gave up the chase, thinking the ball a certain four. It stopped short, and a relay throw was aimed at Intikhab Alam's end as he tried to complete a third run. The throw defeated wicketkeeper David Bairstow, allowing Jackman another two runs. Another attempt to run out Intikhab failed, and he was able to complete the sixth run.

Bore played an important role in the remarkable climax to the 1984 County Championship, which saw Essex and Nottinghamshire neck and neck at the top of the table. Essex had won their final game against Lancashire in two days, but if Nottinghamshire could beat Somerset the title would belong to Trent Bridge. Nottinghamshire were set 297 in 60 overs by Ian Botham, and needed 36 from the last three overs. The last pair were at the wicket, with one of them being the archetypal non batsman, Bore. Clive Rice and Bore recalled the game in 2006 for Cricinfo.

Rice: If you knew Mike, then believe me, every run he made was an unexpected bonus. I wasn't daring even to watch. No one was allowed to move inside the dressing room. Everyone stayed in their seats as we got closer and closer.

Mike Bore: If it was pitched on the off stump, I thought, I'll hit it straight. If it's on my legs, I'll sweep it.

Remarkably, Bore found the middle of the bat time and again, and when the last over started, another 14 runs were needed. Stephen Booth bowled the first ball of the season's last over and Bore scored a boundary. The second ball went to the ropes again, and the third went for two runs. Nottinghamshire needed four more runs from three balls to complete a remarkable win. Bore blocked the fourth ball and Andy Pick, Nottinghamshire's number 11, walked down the pitch to ask "What did you do that for?" "It wasn't in the right place." Bore replied. The next delivery saw Bore launch a blow towards the stands. The crowd and the entire Nottingham team were on their feet and Bore thought, as soon as he'd hit it, "That's it, we've won". However Somerset's substitute Richard Ollis ran in and caught the ball above his head, just ten feet from the boundary. Nottinghamshire had lost by three runs and Bore's innings of 27 had been in vain. As Bore related in an interview with Simon Lister "We were stunned. We got in the car and I don't think we spoke a word until we were well past Gloucester. No matter how many times I lie in bed and replay that ball I never score those four runs".

He subsequently worked as a coach in the Nidderdale League, and was active in the East Yorkshire Cricket Development Group for Yorkshire. He also played league cricket for a number of teams in the north of England.

He died on 2 May 2017 at the age of 69.
