= Philip Bower =

English cricketer

Personal information
- Full name: Philip Salkeld Syndercombe Bower
- Born: 24 September 1898; Holtby, Yorkshire, England
- Died: 12 October 1978 (aged 80); Magaliesberg, Transvaal, South Africa
- Batting: Right-handed
- Relatives: Clive Rice (grandson); Christopher Nevill (great-uncle)

Domestic team information
- Years: Team
- 1919: Oxford University

Career statistics
Competition	First-class
Matches	5
Runs scored	105
Batting average	15.00
100s/50s	0/1
Top score	78
Balls bowled	619
Wickets	11
Bowling average	42.45
5 wickets in innings	0
10 wickets in match	0
Best bowling	3/103
Catches/stumpings	7/–
- Source: Cricinfo, 26 July 2019

Philip Salkeld Syndercombe Bower (24 September 1898 – 12 October 1978) was an English first-class cricketer.

The son of Henry Gregory Syndercombe Bower, he was born at Holtby in September 1898. He was educated at Repton School, entering straight into the Royal Garrison Artillery in September 1917 as a second lieutenant and serving in the final year of the First World War. Following the war he went up to Oriel College, Oxford. While at Oxford, he made his debut in first-class cricket for Oxford University against the Marylebone Cricket Club at Oxford in 1919. He made three further first-class appearances for Oxford in 1919, in addition to making a first-class appearance for H. D. G. Leveson Gower's XI against Oxford University at Eastbourne. For Oxford, he scored 105 runs at an average of 17.50 and a high score of 78. Across all five matches, he took 11 wickets with best figures of 3 for 103.

He later emigrated to South Africa, where he became a farmer in the Transvaal. He died in the Magaliesberg mountain range in South Africa in October 1978. His grandson was the South Africa Test cricketer Clive Rice. His great-uncle, Christopher Nevill, also played first-class cricket.
