= Christopher Neville =

Christopher Neville may refer to:

- Christopher Neville (died 1649), MP for Lewes (UK Parliament constituency)
- Christopher Nevile, MP
- Christopher Nevill, cricketer
- Christopher Nevill, 6th Marquess of Abergavenny (born 1955), British peer
