= Boston Spa Academy =

Academy in Boston Spa, West Yorkshire, England

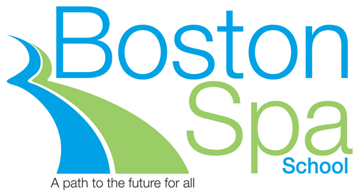

Location
- Clifford Moor Road; Boston Spa, West Yorkshire, LS23 6RW; England; 53.9004°N 1.3620°W

Information
- Type: Academy
- Motto: Exceptional, without exception
- Established: 1973
- Local authority: City of Leeds
- Trust: The GORSE Academies Trust
- Department for Education URN: 146217 Tables
- Ofsted: Reports
- Principal: Peter Hollywood
- Age: 11 to 19
- Enrolment: 1,500
- Website: www.bostonspa.leeds.sch.uk

Boston Spa Academy (formerly Boston Spa Comprehensive School) is a coeducational secondary school for pupils aged 11–19 years old on Clifford Moor Road in Boston Spa, West Yorkshire, England. It is larger than other secondary schools in the area, with 1500 students on roll, including 350 in the sixth form. Boston Spa and neighbouring Wetherby High School have large catchment areas and take pupils from much of north and east Leeds.Over recent years, the proportion of pupils attending Boston Spa Academy from the local areas has significantly increased as the reputation of the school has improved following on from significant improvements in performance. In 2019, Boston Spa was placed in the top 5% of schools nationally and for sixth form was in the highest 250 performing providers in the country.

== History ==
The school developed from the village secondary modern school on High Street. The school opened in 1973. It was made a specialist sports college in 2000, with outside backing from organisations such as Leeds United A.F.C. It has led to partnerships with the Leeds United male and female academies. In 2017 Boston Spa School became Boston Spa Academy.

== Location and student population ==
The school is located in a largely suburban and semi-rural area, approximately 4 miles (6 km) from Wetherby. The school community is predominantly White British teens. The largest minority ethnic groups are Indian and Pakistani.

A specialist learning centre, West Oaks School, is based on the school site.

The school was inspected by Ofsted on 9 and 10 May 2012, on the 'no notice' pilot, being notified the day before. It was judged to be a Grade 2 'Good school' with good judgements in each of four key areas in achievement, behaviour and safety.

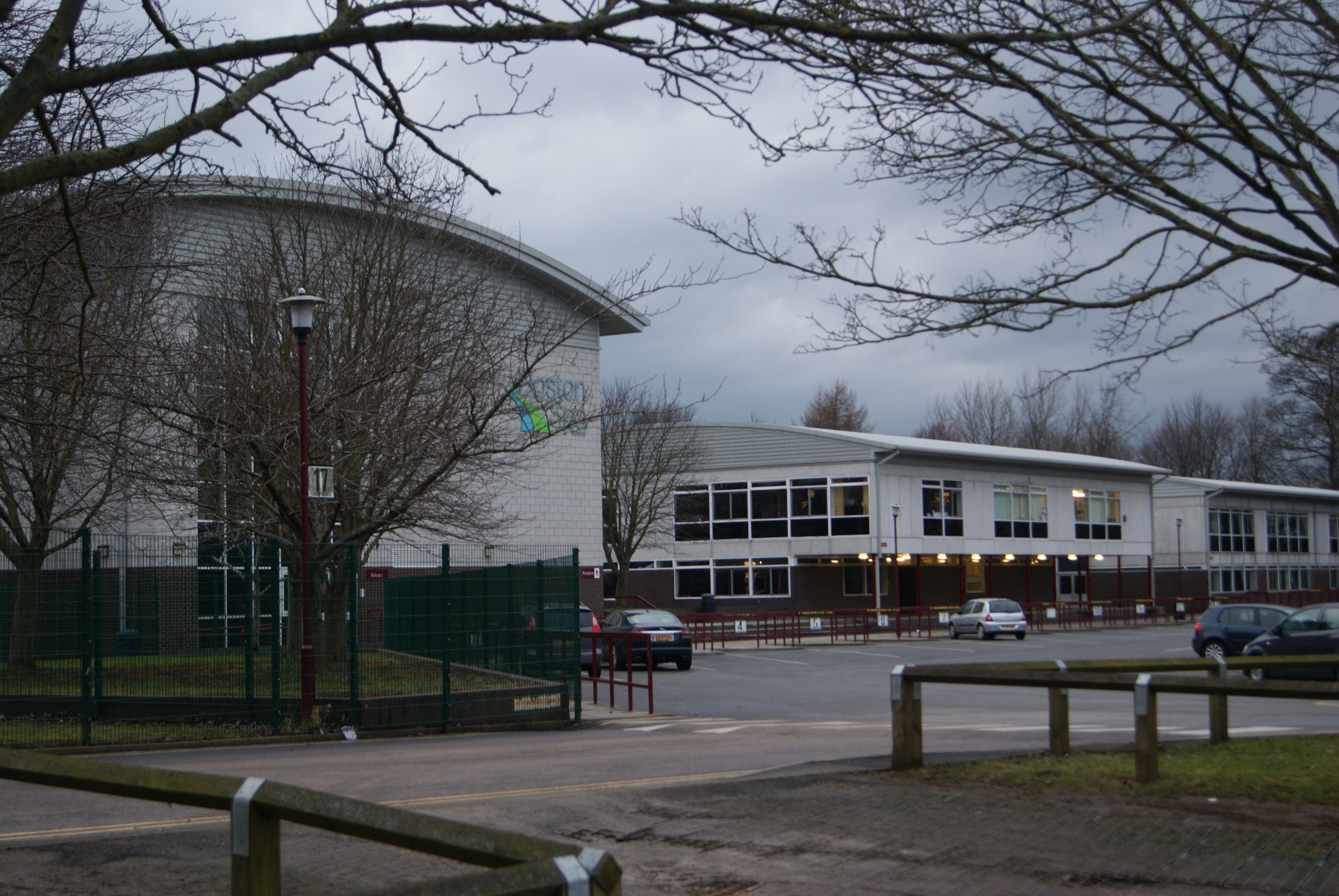
School campus, March 2010

== Alumni ==
- Stephen Booth, cricketer
- Fabian Delph, England international footballer
- Lee Hicken, Film Director
- James Husband, professional footballer
- Simon Johnson, professional footballer
- Matt Jones, Wales international footballer
- Jessica Learmonth Triathlete
- Tom Lees, professional footballer
- Aaron Lennon, England international footballer
- Jonny Maxted, professional footballer
- James Milner, England international footballer
- Gavin Strachan, professional footballer
- Jordan Tansey, professional rugby player
- Simon Walton, professional footballer
- Sophie Walton, professional footballer
- Aidy White, professional footballer
- Danny Williams, professional rugby player
- Alex Zane, TV presenter and DJ
