= Paul Roebuck =

English cricketer

Personal information
- Full name: Paul Gerrard Peter Roebuck
- Born: 14 October 1963 (age 63); Bath, Somerset, England
- Batting: Left-handed
- Bowling: Right-arm medium-fast
- Relatives: Peter Roebuck (brother)

Domestic team information
- Years: Team
- 1983–1985: Cambridge University
- 1984: Gloucestershire
- 1988: Glamorgan

Career statistics
Competition	First-class	List A
Matches	22	7
Runs scored	771	132
Batting average	25.70	22.00
100s/50s	0/3	0/0
Top score	82	33
Balls bowled	455	150
Wickets	6	1
Bowling average	44.83	86.00
5 wickets in innings	0	0
10 wickets in match	0	0
Best bowling	2/44	1/32
Catches/stumpings	8/–	0/–
- Source: Cricinfo, 27 October 2012

Paul Gerrard Peter Roebuck (born 13 October 1963) is a former English cricketer. Roebuck was a right-handed batsman who bowled right-arm medium-fast. He was born in Bath, Somerset, and was educated at Millfield School.

While studying at the University of Cambridge, Roebuck made his first-class debut for Cambridge University against Glamorgan at Fenner's in 1983. He made four further first-class appearances for the university in 1983, before making a further five appearances in 1984. It was in 1984 that he made his only first-class appearance for Gloucestershire against Middlesex in the County Championship at the County Ground, Bristol. The following season, Roebuck made nine first-class appearances for Cambridge University, the last of which came against Oxford University in The University Match at Lord's. In nineteen first-class matches for the university, he scored a total of 686 runs at an average of 28.58, with a high score of 82. One of three half centuries he made, this score came against Somerset (captained by his brother, Peter) in 1985. With the ball, he took 6 wickets at a bowling average of 44.83, with best figures of 2/44.

While playing for the university, he also played List A cricket for the Combined Universities, making his debut in that format against Kent in the 1983 Benson & Hedges Cup. He made six further appearances for the team, the last of which came against Sussex in the 1985 Benson & Hedges Cup. In his seven List A matches, he scored a total of 132 runs at an average of 22.00, with a high score of 33.

He later made two first-class appearances for Glamorgan in the 1988 County Championship against Hampshire and Worcestershire, scoring a total of 60 runs.
