= 1964 Gillette Cup final =

1964 Gillette Cup Final
- Event: 1964 Gillette Cup
Warwickshire	Sussex
127	131/2
48	41.2
- Sussex won by 8 wickets
- Date: 5 September 1964
- Venue: Lord's, London
- Man of the match: Ian Thomson
- Umpires: Arthur Fagg and Dusty Rhodes

The 1964 Gillette Cup Final was a cricket match between Sussex County Cricket Club and Warwickshire County Cricket Club played on 5 September 1964 at Lord's in London. It was the second final of the Gillette Cup, which was the first English domestic knock-out competition between first-class teams. Sussex won the match by eight wickets.

== Background ==
The Gillette Cup had first been contested during the previous season, in response to falling crowds at County Championship matches. Sussex won the first tournament, defeating Worcestershire in the final.

In 1964, the tournament was reduced from 65 to 60 overs per side with individual bowlers restricted to a maximum of 13 overs each, down from 15 in the initial 1963 competition. Both Sussex and Warwickshire had first round byes, and thereafter, Sussex beat Durham, Somerset and Surrey to reach the final, while Warwickshire knocked out Hampshire, Northamptonshire and Lancashire.

== Match ==
=== Summary ===
Warwickshire won the toss and chose to bat first, but lost early wickets, falling to 21 for three. Their captain, Mike Smith steadied the innings to an extent, scoring 28 runs. The bowling of Ian Thomson, who took four wickets for 23 runs across his thirteen overs, conceding less than two runs per over, helped to restrict Warwickshire to a reasonably low total. The batting team were buoyed slightly by a score of 35 not out from Alan Smith, batting at number nine. They were eventually bowled out for 127, with 12 of their 60 overs still remaining.

In their response, Sussex's opening batsman, Ken Suttle and Les Lenham, scored 42 and 47 runs respectively, to help move their team close to the target. After they were each dismissed, the team captain, Ted Dexter, and Jim Parks, Jr. came to the crease and carried their team over the line. Sussex finished on 131 for two, reaching the target with eight wickets and almost 19 overs to spare. Thomson was selected as the man of the match for his bowling performance, by a panel consisting of Len Hutton, Alec Bedser and Freddie Brown.

=== Scorecard ===
5 September 1964
Scorecard

Warwickshire; 127 all out (48 overs)	v	Sussex; 131 for 2 (41.2 overs)
Alan Smith 35*; Ian Thomson 4/23 (13)		Les Lenham 47; Khalid Ibadulla 1/28 (10)

Sussex won by 8 wickets
Lord's Cricket Ground, London
Umpires: Arthur Fagg and Dusty Rhodes
Player of the match: Ian Thomson (Sussex)

== Aftermath ==
By winning the 1964 Gillette Cup, Sussex held onto their title from the previous season, but they did not win the competition again until 1978, despite final appearances in 1968, 1970 and 1973. Warwickshire returned to the final in 1966, beating Worcestershire to win their first title.
