= Shropshire County Cricket Club =

English cricket club

Personnel
- Captain: (England) Charlie Home
- Coach: (England) Karl Krikken

Team information
- Founded: 1844
- Home ground: London Road, Shrewsbury
- Capacity: 3,000

History
- Minor Counties Championship wins: 1 (1973)
- MCCA Knockout Trophy wins: 1 (2010)
- Official website: Shropshire County Cricket Club home

Shropshire County Cricket Club is one of twenty minor county clubs within the domestic cricket structure of England and Wales. It represents the historic county of Shropshire.

The team is a member of the Minor Counties Championship Western Division and plays in the MCCA Knockout Trophy. Shropshire played List A matches occasionally from 1974 until 2005, but is not classified as a List A team per se.

The club plays at Shrewsbury and around the county at Bridgnorth, Oswestry, Shifnal, Wellington, and Whitchurch.

== Honours ==
- Minor Counties Championship (1) – 1973; shared (0) –
- MCCA Knockout Trophy (1) – 2010

== Origins ==
Cricket probably reached Shropshire in the 18th century. The first reference to cricket in the county was in August 1794, when a match was played on Kingsland then on the outskirts of Shrewsbury, by a 'Shrewsbury Cricket Society'.

A county organisation existed in either 1819 or 1829, according to Wisden. In the latter year, according to Tony Percival, a club at Atcham was advertising to play county matches against teams from neighbouring counties but seemingly attracted little interest. The next revival occurred in 1844 when, following a letter from Shrewsbury solicitor G.M. Salt to Bell's Life in London asking for teams from neighbouring English counties or Wales to play Shropshire, Worcestershire played two matches both won by Shropshire. In 1862 a 'Shrewsbury Town and County Cricket Club' was announced to have been formed from an amalgamation of two clubs, by 1866 fixtures were being advertised in newspapers as Shropshire County alone. The Shropshire County Club of this creation lasted until November 1905 when it was resolved a 'Gentlemen of Shropshire' club be formed in its place.

== History ==
The present county club is quite new, having been formed on 28 June 1956 and taking part in the Minor Counties Championship from 1957.

Shropshire has won the Minor Counties Championship once, in 1973. This was the first time the county had even finished in the top 10 of the Minor Counties competition.

Shropshire won the MCCA Knockout Trophy, an annual competition that began in 1983, in 2010.

== Notable players ==
The following Shropshire cricketers also made an impact on the first-class game:

- Doug Slade (former Worcestershire slow left-arm bowler)
- Somachandra de Silva
- Bilal Shafayat (played for Nottinghamshire and Hampshire)
- Andy Lloyd who played one test match for England
- Ian Payne

Also professional footballer Steve Ogrizovic played cricket for Shropshire.
