= Richard Ollis =

English cricketer (born 1961)

Personal information
- Full name: Richard Leslie Ollis
- Born: 14 January 1961 (age 65); Clifton, Bristol, England
- Batting: Left-handed
- Role: Batsman

Domestic team information
- Years: Team
- 1981–1985: Somerset
- First-class debut: 29 August 1981 Somerset v Gloucestershire
- Last First-class: 30 August 1985 Somerset v Derbyshire
- List A debut: 19 June 1983 Somerset v Glamorgan
- Last List A: 16 June 1985 Somerset v Yorkshire

Career statistics
Competition	First-class	List A
Matches	37	16
Runs scored	1016	149
Batting average	18.14	16.55
100s/50s	–/4	–/–
Top score	99*	46
Balls bowled	30	–
Wickets	–	–
Bowling average	–	–
5 wickets in innings	–	–
10 wickets in match	–	–
Best bowling	0/2	–
Catches/stumpings	19/–	5/–
- Source: CricketArchive, 17 November 2010

Richard Leslie Ollis (born 14 January 1961) played first-class and List A cricket for Somerset between 1981 and 1985. He was born at Clifton, Bristol.

The son of a haulage contractor from Keynsham, Ollis was an upright left-handed batsman used either as an opener or in the middle order. He also bowled occasional right-arm medium pace and once or twice kept wicket.

Ollis played for Somerset's second eleven in the Second Eleven Championship and the Minor Counties from 1978, and made his first-class debut in two matches at the end of the 1981 season. He played only once in 1982, but in 1983, he was brought into the team when Somerset's Test players, Ian Botham, Vic Marks, Viv Richards and Joel Garner disappeared on World Cup duty and stayed there for much of the season. Ollis's first game of the season was against Gloucestershire at Bristol; after two declarations, Gloucestershire set Somerset 330 to win in 217 minutes and as opening batsmen Ollis and Somerset captain Peter Roebuck made no attempt to go for the runs. At the designated close of play, they had reached 174 for no wicket, with Ollis not out 99, and Gloucestershire captain David Graveney bowled an extra over in an attempt to secure Ollis his century; however Ollis was unable to score from it, and finished on 99 not out. That proved to be the highest score of Ollis's first-class career, though he passed 50 twice more in the 1983 season on his way to his best aggregate and average, 517 runs at 25.85.

In 1984, Ollis was out of form and featured in only six first-class matches, making only 112 runs in them. But he returned to fairly regular cricket in 1985, appearing in 15 first-class matches and turning out regularly for the first time in Somerset's limited-overs side, though without much success. His 55 against Warwickshire was his only score of more than 50 in all matches in 1985, and it was overshadowed by the innings of 322 by Richards, made in less than five hours; Ollis shared a third wicket partnership of 174 with Richards. At the end of the 1985 season, Ollis's contract was not renewed by Somerset and he left first-class cricket.
