= Stephen Booth (cricketer) =

English cricketer (born 1963)

Personal information
- Full name: Stephen Charles Booth
- Born: 30 October 1963 (age 63); Leeds, Yorkshire, England
- Batting: Right-handed
- Bowling: Slow left-arm orthodox

Domestic team information
- Years: Team
- 1983–1985: Somerset
- First-class debut: 27 July 1983 Somerset v Northamptonshire
- Last First-class: 24 July 1985 Somerset v Warwickshire

Career statistics
Competition	First-class
Matches	33
Runs scored	202
Batting average	10.63
100s/50s	0/0
Top score	42
Balls bowled	6,512
Wickets	87
Bowling average	36.31
5 wickets in innings	0
10 wickets in match	0
Best bowling	4/26
Catches/stumpings	33/–
- Source: CricketArchive, 12 June 2014

Stephen Charles Booth (born 30 October 1963) was an English first-class cricketer who played for Somerset County Cricket Club from 1983 to 1985.

Born at Cross Gates in Leeds, Booth attended Boston Spa Comprehensive School and made his debut as a right-handed batsman and slow left-arm orthodox bowler in a Somerset side boasting such talents as Joel Garner and Viv Richards.

In 33 first-class matches he took 87 wickets, with a best of 4/26, at an average of 36.31. He scored 202 runs, with a highest score of 42, at 10.63.

Peter Roebuck nicknamed him 'Heathcliff' in his published diary of a county season.
