= Mike Taylor (cricketer, born 1942) =

English cricketer

Personal information
- Full name: Michael Norman Somerset Taylor
- Born: 12 November 1942 (age 84); Amersham, Buckinghamshire, England
- Batting: Right-handed
- Bowling: Right-arm medium
- Relatives: Derek Taylor (twin brother)

Domestic team information
- Years: Team
- 1961–1962: Buckinghamshire
- 1964–1972: Nottinghamshire
- 1973–1980: Hampshire
- 1976/77: Northern Transvaal

Career statistics
Competition	First-class	List A
Matches	375	226
Runs scored	8,023	1,803
Batting average	19.95	16.85
100s/50s	3/30	–/2
Top score	105	58
Balls bowled	50,831	10,508
Wickets	830	269
Bowling average	26.52	25.66
5 wickets in innings	24	–
10 wickets in match	–	–
Best bowling	7/23	4/20
Catches/stumpings	213/–	55/–
- Source: Cricinfo, 13 February 2024

Michael Norman Somerset Taylor (born 12 November 1942) was an English first-class cricketer who played mainly for Nottinghamshire County Cricket Club and Hampshire County Cricket Club in a career that spanned the 1964 and 1980 seasons and included 375 first-class and 226 limited overs matches.

Taylor was born along, of course, with twin Brother Derek at Shardeloes House an 18th Century Manor House set in the Chiltern Hills just outside Amersham. His early cricket was played at Amersham Hill C.C. and then Chesham C.C. where he benefitted from being coached by Alf Pope the ex-Derbyshire bowler. Before moving to Trent Bridge Taylor played Minor County Cricket for Buckinghamshire. Whilst qualifying by residence for Nottinghamshire he enjoyed a successful season in 1963 with Spen Victoria C.C. in the Bradford League.

Taylor was a right-handed batsman and a right-arm medium pace bowler. He made his first-class debut for Nottinghamshire in 1964 and played there until 1972, when he was not offered a new contract, despite playing in 230 matches with a batting average of 18.01 and 522 wickets at 27.88. For Nottinghamshire, an early highlight with the ball was 5 for 23 including the hat-trick v Kent at Dover in August 1965. Wilson, Cowdrey & Leary the victims. The 1968 season proved to be his most fruitful with the ball 99 wickets at exactly 21 apiece. He then had match figures of 7 for 70 which wrapped up victory for Notts at Swansea in 1968, following Garry Sobers 6 sixes off a Malcolm Nash over on day one.In that final season with Nottinghamshire he played in a Gillette Cup match against Hampshire at Trent Bridge, taking 2–39 in 12 overs and top-scoring with 58, and when they learned of his release, Hampshire signed him. He had an immediate impact, for in 1973 he took 64 first-class wickets at 21.71, and scored 507 runs at 24.14, to help his new county to their second title. His bowling figures were even better in 1974 when they were foiled by the weather in the search for a second successive Championship, and through the 1970s he proved himself one of the best of Hampshire's signings from another county. In addition to his fine medium-pace bowling he scored his first century for the county in 1977, and there was another in 1978. In that season, age 35, he was a member of the Hampshire side that won the Sunday League, as he had been in 1975. He retired at the end of the 1980 season and became Hampshire's Assistant Secretary and then Marketing Manager, not least during the demanding 1990s in the move to the Rose Bowl. He took 308 first-class wickets for Hampshire at 24.21, plus 162 limited-overs wickets at 25.70 and an economy rate below four runs per over. His best bowling was 7-23 v his former county Nottinghamshire at Basingstoke in 1977. He retired from the office in 2002, after 30 years with his 'new' county.

Across 11 English Winters from 1966-1979 (two in the UK), he coached three seasons for the Transvaal Cricket Union ( now Gauteng ) and eight for Jeppe High Schools for Boys, both based in Johannesburg. He also played one season for Pilkington Glass C.C in Springs, and five seasons for E.R.P.M. East Rand Propriety Mines in Boksburg (Winners of the Harlequin Cup 1974/75). Both these clubs were situated in what was the Northern Transvaal and he played one match for NT in the List A Datsun Shield v Rhodesia. <Dave Allen 'Hampshire County Cricketers' Moyhill 2018>

Mike Taylor is the twin brother of Derek Taylor, the Somerset wicket-keeper.
