= Psychology Maziwisa =

Zimbabwean politician and lawyer

- Born: 1989 (age 36–37); Zimbabwe
- Occupations: Lawyer, politician

Psychology Maziwisa (born 1 March 1989) is a Zimbabwean lawyer and politician.

== Early and personal life ==
Maziwisa was born on 1 March 1983 in Mutare, Zimbabwe’s third-largest city. Son of a schoolteacher, William Chatambudza Maziwisa and his wife Sarah Guku, Maziwisa moved to Inyati Mine with his parents where he began his primary education at Chiropa Primary School. At the age of eight, he was known for eloquently reciting lengthy poems prepared for him by his father.

In 1994, Maziwisa moved to Chitungwiza where he attended Grade 6 at Seke 6 Primary School and later did part of his secondary schooling at Seke Mhuriimwe High School. His father soon resign from work due to poor health and in 1999 Maziwisa was accepted at St Joseph's House for Boys, a home for orphans and destitute children.

Whilst there, Maziwisa attended Ellis Robins High School, initially through the help of St Joseph's, and later on through the assistance of the late, renowned cricket journalist Peter Roebuck. Maziwisa won a series of national awards including scoring a first class in Public Speaking and News Reading. He completed his A-Levels at Ellis Robins High in 2002.

== Tertiary education ==
Maziwisa has a master's degree in international relations from the University of Zimbabwe. Maziwisa also read law at the University of KwaZulu Natal (UKZN). He was known amongst his peers as having a passion for politics and would soon start his own political organization within the university called the Principled African Students Organization (PASO). PASO contested in the Student Representative Council (SRC) elections and won 2 out of 10 seats. Maziwisa was elected as the deputy SRC president.

He graduated in April 2008 and was offered a post as a candidate attorney at Tomlinson Mnguni James Attorneys (TMJ), one of the leading law firms in Pietermaritzburg.

== Political career ==
Maziwisa wrote a series of articles critical of ZANU PF and President Mugabe while serving his articles at TMJ. But after being approached by Saviour Kasukuwere in 2010 (then Minister of Youth Development, Indigenisation and Empowerment), he tendered his resignation and decided to move back to Zimbabwe to work for Robert Mugabe. This caused a rupture between Maziwisa and his benefactor, Peter Roebuck.

When Peter Roebuck died in 2011, Maziwisa described him as one of the most integral people in his life. He would later reveal that Roebuck had molested him at age 16.

Maziwisa worked as Kasukuwere's advisor and started to pen hard-hitting articles criticizing Morgan Tsvangirai. In no time, Maziwisa grew to become Tsvangirai's fiercest critic. Maziwisa ran a blog on newzimbabwe.com and was widely quoted in the print media, and radio as a political commentator. In February 2013, Maziwisa was head-hunted for a role in ZANU PF's Information Department. He was appointed Deputy Director of Information.

As elections drew closer, Maziwisa made headlines when he accused Coca-Cola for disguising its ‘Crazy for Good’ initiative as a genuine marketing tool when in fact it was an attempt to promote the MDC-T. Maziwisa intensified his anti-MDC-T rhetoric in the period leading up to the 31 July elections describing Tsvangirai as a miserable loser who had created more babies than jobs. He officially became ZANU PF spokesperson throughout the election period and was quoted extensively by BBC, BBC Radio, CCTV, SABC, eNCA, and Al-JaZeera.

== Controversies, corruption allegations and arrest ==
Speaking during a dialogue hosted by the Young People in Politics in Harare on Friday 14 July 2017, Psychology fallaciously claimed that ZANU PF had created more than 3 million jobs as it promised ahead of their election win in 2013. However, with Zimbabwe's formal unemployment rate in 2017 being estimated at more than 80%, he justified their job creation promise by insinuating that the jobs were casual jobs in the informal sector. He was quoted saying: "When you define what a job is it includes casual jobs. So for example you can use the word job in the sentence as follows: 'I gave him a job to wash my clothes.' And that sentence is grammatically correct," Maziwisa said amid howls of laughter from other participants.

After brief reflection, Zimbabweans took to Twitter to portray the irony of the politician's words. Using the hashtag, #JobsZanuCreated, the posts reflect the many “jobs” that Zimbabweans do to survive. They suggested jobs like Spikes-welder, bank queuers, pothole fillers and thigh vendors qualify admirably as some of the “jobs” Zanu-PF has created in Zimbabwe, where people are forced to queue for hours to withdraw money from their cash-strapped banks, or turn to menial or degrading work to make ends meet.

On Tuesday January 9, 2018, Psychology Maziwisa and a former Zimbabwe Broadcasting Corporation News anchor turned business partner, were arrested by the Zimbabwe Anti-Corruption Commission (ZACC) for fraud. This was after they fraudulently claimed to have done some billable public relations consultancy services for the Zimbabwe Power Company (ZPC), under a tendered contract from the former Energy and Power Development Minister Samuel Undenge, who is also facing allegations of corruption. Samuel Undenge was Minister of Anti-Corruption and Anti-Monopolies in Zimbabwe at some point in time.

Maziwisa sought to explain his party's performance in government at a public meeting. He seemed irked by the fact that members of the opposition had ascribed a rather narrow definition to the term "job" to suit their political narrative. He argued that the term "job" in fact is a broad term with a wide meaning which includes, but is not limited to, casual as well as informal jobs. According to this wide interpretation, Maziwisa argued, it was possible that his party Zanu PF through its various enabling policies had created more jobs than the opposition was willing to admit. This invited serious ridicule on social media but Maziwisa was unfazed.

Maziwisa remained in ZANU–PF and in fact rigorously campaigned for President Emmerson Mnangagwa in Highfields during the 2018 elections. He engaged top lawyer Jonathan Samukange when he was arrested.
