= John Spencer (cricketer, born 1949) =

English cricketer

Cricket information
- Batting: Right-handed
- Bowling: Right-arm medium

Career statistics
| Competition | First-class | List A |
|---|---|---|
| Matches | 215 | 192 |
| Runs scored | 2,787 | 454 |
| Batting average | 13.52 | 8.90 |
| 100s/50s | 0/6 | 0/0 |
| Top score | 79 | 35 |
| Balls bowled | 34,322 | 9262 |
| Wickets | 554 | 228 |
| Bowling average | 26.39 | 23.33 |
| 5 wickets in innings | 21 | 0 |
| 10 wickets in match | 1 | 0 |
| Best bowling | 6/19 | 4/16 |
| Catches/stumpings | 75/– | 42/– |
- Source: CricketArchive, 6 December 2022

John Spencer (born 6 October 1949) is a former English first-class cricketer. He was educated at Brighton, Hove & Sussex Grammar School. A fast bowler, he played for Cambridge University and Sussex and was named the Sussex Cricket Society's Player of the Year in 1975.

He played for Sussex from 1969 to 1980, and for Cambridge University from 1970 to 1972, taking 554 wickets at 26.39.

His most successful match was for Cambridge University against the Pakistanis in 1971, when he took 6 for 40 and 5 for 58 to help the university to a 10-wicket victory, its first win against a touring side since 1927.

A geography graduate of Queens' College, Cambridge, John Spencer became a master at Brighton College, where he also was in charge of cricket. Amongst the pupils he coached were Matt Prior, later the England wicket-keeper, and Holly Colvin and Sarah Taylor, both later England cricketers and who played on equal terms with the schoolboys.
