= 2022 English cricket season =

Cricket in England

County Championship
- Champions: Surrey
- Runners-up: Lancashire
- Most runs: Wayne Madsen (1,273)
- Most wickets: Toby Roland-Jones (67)

Royal London One-Day Cup
- Champions: Kent
- Runners-up: Lancashire
- Most runs: Stephen Eskinazi (658)
- Most wickets: Brett Hutton (22)

T20 Blast
- Champions: Hampshire Hawks
- Runners-up: Lancashire Lightning
- Most runs: James Vince (678)
- Most wickets: Richard Gleeson (25)

Rachael Heyhoe Flint Trophy
- Champions: Northern Diamonds
- Runners-up: Southern Vipers
- Most runs: Lauren Winfield-Hill (470)
- Most wickets: Grace Scrivens (13); Linsey Smith (13)

Charlotte Edwards Cup
- Champions: Southern Vipers
- Runners-up: Central Sparks
- Most runs: Amy Jones (289)
- Most wickets: Katie Levick (15)

The Hundred
- Champions: Oval Invincibles (women's); Trent Rockets (men's)
- Runners-up: Southern Brave (women's); Manchester Originals (men's)
- Most runs: Laura Wolvaardt (286) (women's); Dawid Malan (377) (men's)
- Most wickets: Amanda-Jade Wellington (17) (women's); Paul Walter (14) (men's); Tom Helm (14) (men's); Jordan Thompson (14) (men's)

Wisden Cricketers of the Year
- Jasprit Bumrah, Devon Conway, Ollie Robinson, Rohit Sharma, Dane van Niekerk

The 2022 English cricket season began on 7 April 2022 and finished on 29 September 2022. It was the 122nd season in which the County Championship has been an official competition and features First-Class, List-A and Twenty20 cricket competitions throughout England and Wales.

The 18 first-class counties competed in the 2022 County Championship, One-Day Cup, and T20 Blast competitions, whilst women's teams competed for the Rachael Heyhoe Flint Trophy and the Charlotte Edwards Cup.

The season also saw the second edition of The Hundred, for both men and women.

In January 2022, the ECB announced that the Bob Willis Trophy, which was played to end the County Championship in 2020 and 2021, would not be played in 2022; managing director of county cricket Neil Snowball said that the ECB was discussing the future format of the trophy with Willis's family.

== International tours ==
Three international men's sides toured England in 2022: New Zealand, India and South Africa. England also toured the Netherlands in June 2022, beating them 3–0 in an ODI series.

Two international women's sides toured in England in 2022: South Africa and India. Eight teams also competed in the 2022 Commonwealth Games, held in Birmingham in July and August.

=== New Zealand men's tour ===
In June 2022, the New Zealand men's cricket team toured England to play three Test matches, part of the 2021–2023 ICC World Test Championship. England won the series 3–0.

=== India men's tour ===
In July 2022, the India men's cricket team toured England to play 1 Test match, three ODIs and three T20Is. The Test match, won by England, was a continuation of the 2021 series between the same sides, which was curtailed due to COVID-19 cases in the Indian camp. India won both the ODI series and the T20I series 2–1.

=== South Africa men's tour ===
From July to September 2022, the South Africa men's cricket team toured England to play three Test matches, three ODIs and three T20Is. England won the Test series 2–1, whilst the ODI series was drawn 1–1 and the T20I series won by South Africa 2–1. South Africa also played two T20Is against Ireland at the County Ground, Bristol, winning both.

=== South Africa women's tour ===
In June and July 2022, the South Africa women's cricket team toured England, playing one WTest, three WODIs and three WT20Is. The Test match was drawn, whilst England won both the WODI and WT20I series 3–0.

=== Commonwealth Games ===
A cricket tournament was held at the 2022 Commonwealth Games in Birmingham, cricket's first inclusion since 1998 and the first time a women's tournament had been included. Australia, India, Barbados and Pakistan competed in Group A, whilst England, New Zealand, South Africa and Sri Lanka. Australia, India, England and New Zealand progressed to the semi-finals, with India beating England and Australia beating New Zealand. New Zealand beat England to claim the bronze medal, whilst Australia beat India to win the gold medal.

=== India women's tour ===
In September 2022, the India women's cricket team toured England, playing three WODIs (part of the 2022–2025 ICC Women's Championship) and three WT20Is. England won the WT20I series 2–1, whilst India won the WODI series 3–0.

== Domestic cricket ==
=== County Championship ===
The men's County Championship began on 7 April and finished on 29 September. The tournament returned to a two-division format for the first time since 2019, with ten of the eighteen Counties in Division One and the other eight in Division Two. The teams were placed into the division that they qualified for following the result of the 2019 season. Surrey were crowned County Champions with a round of fixtures to spare. Yorkshire and Gloucestershire were relegated from Division One, with Nottinghamshire and Middlesex promoted to replace them.

=== Royal London One-Day Cup ===
The One-Day Cup ran from 2 August to 17 September with the counties separated into two groups of nine. Kent defeated Lancashire in the final, winning by 21 runs.

=== T20 Blast ===
The T20 Blast ran from 25 May until 16 July with the eighteen counties divided into two groups of nine - the North Group and the South Group. Despite finishing fourth in their group, Hampshire Hawks were crowned champions beating Lancashire Lightning by a single run in the final.

=== The Hundred ===
The second season of The Hundred took place in August and September, with eight men's and eight women's teams competing. The women's competition was shorter than the men's due to the women's tournament at the 2022 Commonwealth Games. Oval Invincibles defended their title in the women's competition, whilst Trent Rockets won the men's competition.

=== Rachael Heyhoe Flint Trophy ===
The Rachael Heyhoe Flint Trophy began on 2 July, with eight regional teams competing in a round-robin group. The final took place on 25 September at Lord's, a repeat of the previous year's final between Northern Diamonds and Southern Vipers. Northern Diamonds won the tournament, their first title.

=== Charlotte Edwards Cup ===
The Charlotte Edwards Cup began on 14 May, with eight regional teams divided into two groups. Southern Vipers, South East Stars and Central Sparks progressed to Finals Day at the County Ground, Northampton. Southern Vipers beat Central Sparks by 6 wickets in the final.

=== Women's County Cricket ===
The Women's Twenty20 Cup took place in April and May 2022, with eight regional winners. Various regional county competitions also took place: the East of England Women's County Championship, the Women's London Championship, the Women's London Cup, the South Central Counties Cup and the West Midlands Regional Cup.

=== National Counties Cricket ===
Berkshire won the National Counties Championship, beating Lincolnshire by an innings and 69 runs in the final. Berkshire also won the NCCA Trophy for the third consecutive season, beating Cumbria by 5 wickets in the final.
