= Neil Hartley =

English cricketer (born 1956)

Stuart Neil Hartley (born 18 March 1956) is a retired English first-class cricketer.

Born in Shipley, West Yorkshire, Hartley appeared for Yorkshire County Cricket Club and Orange Free State in a ten-year career which began in 1978.

A right-handed middle order batsman and right arm medium pace bowler, he scored a total of 4,667 runs at 24.95, with four centuries, and a best score of 114. He scored 2,859 one day runs at 22.87. He took 48 first-class wickets at 45.45, and 67 in one day games at a cost of 32.43. In 1974, he played for England Young Cricketers.

He captained Yorkshire's Second XI for four years from 1988, and later played in the Bradford League.

He was divorced from Victoria Illingworth and married Anne Eley in 2018.

Hartley now works in the field of sports insurance. He briefly returned to Yorkshire as vice-chairman in 2021.
