= Lee Hicken =

- Occupations: Film Director and Entrepreneur
- Notable work: Do You Want To Win? (2017); As Good As It Gets? (2018); Take Us Home: Leeds United (2019); We Play League (2020)

Lee Hicken (born 1981) is a media entrepreneur, film, television and documentary director/producer and owner of award-winning film company The City Talking, based in Leeds, West Yorkshire, England. His most recent project was a documentary series about Leeds United during the 2018–19 and 2019–20 seasons available on Amazon Prime and ESPN.

== Early life ==
Lee Hicken was born in Leeds in 1981. He studied Film and Television at University in England and then later studied Fashion Marketing and Communication at the European Institute of Design in Barcelona during his early/mid twenties. Hicken returned to England in 2009.

== Career ==
=== Music in Leeds (2015) ===
Hicken's first film was Music in Leeds, a documentary made in conjunction with the BBC in 2015 examining the history of the music scene in the city. The film was premiered on December 8, 2015 at Belgrave Music Hall in Leeds with many of the artists who inspired and featured in the film in attendance including the Kaiser Chiefs, Utah Saints, Pigeon Detectives, the Sisters of Mercy and Bridewell Taxis. The City Talking's synopsis of the film read: ‘he City Talking: Music in Leeds, Vol.1, applies the storytelling sensibilities of The City Talking to a thirty-five year period when music made Leeds a city where you didn't want to miss a note, a beat, a synth stab or a chord.’

=== Do You Want To Win? (2017) ===
A documentary about Leeds United's renaissance in the early 1990s under Howard Wilkinson entitled Do You Want To Win?, released in 2017, continued The City Talking's shift more towards becoming more a film-based media company. The one-off documentary feature, Do You Want To Win? documents how, in October 1988, Howard Wilkinson laid down a simple challenge to Leeds United, the players and the city. The City Talking's synopsis of the film is: ‘Do You Want To Win? is the story of how Leeds United emerged from the shadows of history and reputation, and by 1992 got back not only what it wanted, but what it deserved. It stars Vinnie Jones, Gordon Strachan, Gary McAllister and Howard Wilkinson.‘, which in the summer of 2018 became available to watch for Prime Video customers across the UK, Canada, Australia, New Zealand and the USA.

=== As Good As It Gets? (2018) ===
As Good As It Gets? is the story of the most successful period in Leeds Rhinos’ history, and how a tight knit group of people won multiple Super League Titles, Challenge Cups and World Club Challenges, culminating in the historic treble of 2015. The film stars Kevin Sinfield, Jamie Peacock, Jamie Jones-Buchanan, Brian McDermott, Gary Hetherington and is narrated by actor Matthew Lewis. Lee Hicken, an ardent Rhinos supporter, directed the film and carried out the key interviews himself.

=== Take Us Home: Leeds United (2019 & 2020) ===
At the start of the 2018–19 season, it was agreed that The City Talking would produce a season-long behind-the-scenes docu-series about Leeds United, entitled Take Us Home: Leeds United. The six-part docuseries debuted on Amazon Prime in August 2019 and closely follows Marcelo Bielsa's team throughout the 2018–19 season, including "Spygate" and how the club handled the fallout of the infamous saga. The failed Dan James transfer from Swansea City to Leeds in January 2019 is also featured with extensive footage. The first episode of the series premiered at Everyman cinema in Leeds on August 14, 2019 with the majority of Bielsa's squad present. Leeds United chief executive Angus Kinnear addressed the audience at Everyman while Hicken also spoke along with club captain Liam Cooper. The series, which The City Talking filmed in Argentina, Norway and Australia, earned popular acclaim from the club's global fanbase, despite the team's failure to earn promotion. The final episode includes an exclusive interview with Bielsa, a rarity during his long and distinguished coaching career spanning several decades and continents.

Season 2 of the show follows the club through the 2019–20 season as the team looks to go one-better than the previous year. Another dramatic campaign is interrupted by the global pandemic and the season is stopped indefinitely at the end of the first half of the story. The second half of the series follows the team through to the end of the season as they look to seal a place back in the Premier League.

The show has won Royal Television Society Awards for 'Best Documentary Series' and 'Best Use of Music & Sound'.

=== Welcome to Berlin (2021) ===
In August 2020, it was announced by Variety that Hicken would direct a new documentary series for Pulse Films on Berlin and the football club, Hertha BSC. Academy Award Winner, James Marsh is an executive producer on the show.

=== Macho Man (2022) ===
In 2021, it was announced Hicken would write and direct a new film 'Macho Man' based on the life of legendary professional wrestler 'Macho Man Randy Savage'. The film is due for release in 2022.

== Filmography ==
Year	Title	Director	Writer	Executive Producer	Notes
2015	The City Talking: Music in Leeds, Vol. 1	Yes	Yes	Yes	Released on BBC Music
2017	Do You Want to Win?	Yes	No	Yes	Released on Amazon Prime.
2018	As Good As It Gets?	Yes	Yes	Yes	Released on Amazon Prime.
2019	Take Us Home: Leeds United (S1)	Yes	Yes	Yes	Amazon Prime exclusive + ESPN
2020	We Play League	Yes	Yes	Yes	Sky Sports (UK) and Amazon Prime (World).
2020	Take Us Home: Leeds United (S2)	Yes	Yes	Yes	Amazon Prime exclusive series
2022	Davey Boy	Yes	Yes	Yes	In Production
2022	Rangers72	No	No	Yes	Released on Amazon Prime Video
2025	Morata: They Don't Know Who I Am	Yes	Yes	Yes	Released on Movistar+
