= Chris Maynard =

English cricketer (born 1958)

Personal information
- Full name: Christopher Maynard
- Born: 8 April 1958 (age 68); Haslemere, Surrey, England
- Batting: Right-handed
- Role: Wicket-keeper

Domestic team information
- Years: Team
- 1978–1982: Warwickshire
- 1982–1986: Lancashire

Career statistics
Competition	First-class	List A
Matches	117	127
Runs scored	2,541	1,138
Batting average	20.65	16.25
100s/50s	1/12	0/1
Top score	132*	60
Balls bowled	12	–
Wickets	0	–
Bowling average	–	–
5 wickets in innings	–	–
10 wickets in match	–	–
Best bowling	–	–
Catches/stumpings	186/28	95/14
- Source: CricketArchive, 18 October 2024

Christopher Maynard (born 8 April 1958) is a former English cricketer who played for Warwickshire and Lancashire from 1978 to 1986. He was born in Haslemere, Surrey. He appeared in 117 first-class matches as a righthanded batsman and wicketkeeper. He scored 2,541 runs with a highest score of 132*, his only century, and held 186 catches with 28 stumpings.
