= Ian Payne (English cricketer) =

English cricketer

Personal information
- Full name: Ian Roger Payne
- Born: 9 May 1958 (age 68); Kennington, London
- Batting: Right-handed
- Bowling: Right-arm medium

Domestic team information
- Years: Team
- 1977–1984: Surrey
- 1985–1986: Gloucestershire
- 1994–1997: Shropshire

Career statistics
Competition	First-class	List A
Matches	47	82
Runs scored	550	605
Batting average	12.22	16.80
100s/50s	0/0	0/2
Top score	43	56*
Balls bowled	3,839	2,937
Wickets	45	69
Bowling average	42.60	32.14
5 wickets in innings	1	2
10 wickets in match	0	0
Best bowling	5/13	5/21
Catches/stumpings	41/–	17/–
- Source: Cricinfo, 16 July 2019

Ian Roger Payne (born 9 May 1958) is a former English cricketer.

Payne was a right-arm medium-pace bowler and right-handed lower-order batsman. He was educated at Emanuel School and won The Cricket Society Wetherall Award for the leading all-rounder in English schools cricket in 1976, when he scored 1144 runs at an average of 52.00 and took 79 wickets at 8.68.

He played first-class cricket for Surrey from 1977 to 1984 and Gloucestershire in 1985 and 1986, and later played Minor Counties cricket for Shropshire from 1994 to 1997. He won the man of the match award when he took 3 for 20 off 11 overs to help Surrey to a three-run victory in a semi-final of the Benson & Hedges Cup in 1981.

Payne's best first-class bowling figures were 5 for 13 in Surrey's innings victory over Gloucestershire in 1983. His best List A figures were 5 for 21 against Derbyshire in 1982.

Payne, who has played for Oswestry Cricket Club, is a director, and his wife Jools is the principal, of the Oswestry PR company The Jools Payne Partnership.
