= John Birch (cricketer) =

English cricketer (born 1955)

Personal information
- Full name: John Dennis Birch
- Born: 18 June 1955 (age 71); Aspley, Nottingham, England
- Batting: Right-handed
- Bowling: Right-arm medium pace
- Role: Batter
- Relatives: Son, Dan Birch

Domestic team information
- Years: Team
- 1973–1988: Nottinghamshire

Career statistics
Competition	First-class	List A
Matches	250	235
Runs scored	8,673	3,793
Batting average	27.53	24.95
100s/50s	6/51	–/19
Top score	125	92
Balls bowled	4,005	1,416
Wickets	50	35
Bowling average	48.92	31.82
5 wickets in innings	1	–
10 wickets in match	–	–
Best bowling	6/64	3/26
Catches/stumpings	182/–	53/–
- Source: CricketArchive, 9 November 2024

John Dennis Birch (born 18 June 1955) is an English former first-class cricketer active 1973–1988 who played for Nottinghamshire. Born in Nottingham, he made his first-class debut as a teenager batting in the middle order. Originally considered an all-rounder because of his medium-pace change bowling, his bowling faded away as he matured into a consistent, but never prolific, batsman and fine fielder.
