= Terry Davies (cricketer) =

English cricketer (born 1960)

Terry Davies (born 25 October 1960 (age 64)) is an English former cricketer active from 1979 to 1986 who was born in St Albans and played for Glamorgan. He appeared in 100 first-class matches as a righthanded batsman and wicketkeeper. He scored 1,775 runs with a highest score of 75 and completed 166 catches with 27 stumpings.
