= Christopher Nevill =

Cricketer

Christopher Nevill (born 20 March 1800 at Easton, Hampshire; died 15 December 1847 at East Grinstead, Sussex) was an English amateur cricketer who played from 1820 to 1822 for Cambridge University Cricket Club. He made 3 known appearances in important matches.

Nevill was educated at Winchester College and St John's College, Cambridge. He subsequently became ordained as an Anglican clergyman, and from 1835 until his death was Vicar of East Grinstead.
