= Basher Hassan =

Kenyan cricketer

Personal information
- Full name: Sheikh Basharat Hassan
- Born: 24 March 1944 (age 82); Nairobi, Kenya
- Nickname: Basher
- Batting: Right-handed
- Bowling: Right-arm medium
- Role: Occasional wicketkeeper

Domestic team information
- Years: Team
- 1966–1985: Nottinghamshire

Career statistics
Competition	First-class	List A
Matches	332	285
Runs scored	14,394	6,842
Batting average	29.07	28.04
100s/50s	15/83	4/36
Top score	182*	120*
Balls bowled	847	142
Wickets	6	5
Bowling average	67.83	30.20
5 wickets in innings	0	0
10 wickets in match	0	0
Best bowling	3/33	3/20
Catches/stumpings	310/1	121/3
- Source: Cricinfo, 1 November 2010

Sheikh Basharat "Basher" Hassan (born 24 March 1944) is a retired Kenyan first-class cricketer who played for Nottinghamshire County Cricket Club from 1966 to 1985. A right-handed batsman, he made 14,394 runs at an average of 29.07.

== Biography ==
After playing club cricket in Kenya, Hassan made his first-class debut for an East African Invitation XI against the Marylebone Cricket Club in 1963. He moved to England and made his debut for Nottinghamshire in 1966 against Oxford University whilst serving the then mandatory period of qualification. Having made 579 runs in 1967 he was forced to sit out the 1968 season when Gary Sobers was engaged. Initially a wicketkeeper, he developed as an opening batsman although he occasionally kept wicket in List A cricket. He was a notable fieldsman; in 1971 Wisden said that "his brilliance in the covers stamped him as one of the outstanding men in this position in the country" and that his team-mates were "fired by the example of the enthusiastic Hassan".

He became a regular member of the Nottinghamshire first team in 1969 and scored 1,000 runs in a season on five occasions and scored fifteen centuries. His highest score was 182 not out against Gloucestershire in 1977. In List A matches his highest was 120 not out against Warwickshire in 1981.

He was notably omitted from the East Africa team (which included Kenya the country of his birth) selected to play in the inaugural Cricket World Cup in 1975. Despite his experience in first-class cricket he was overlooked likely as selectors supposedly made a point of picking players that were currently living and playing in East Africa.

He was 12th man for England in a Test in 1985 at Trent Bridge during the Ashes series after which he retired from county cricket. He was for some years the Nottinghamshire Development Manager.
