= Paul Phillipson =

English cricketer

Cricket information
- Batting: Right-handed
- Bowling: Right-arm medium

Career statistics
Competition	First-class
Matches	168
Runs scored	3,052
Batting average	18.49
100s/50s	0/12
Top score	87
Balls bowled	10,664
Wickets	153
Bowling average	34.07
5 wickets in innings	4
10 wickets in match	0
Best bowling	6/56
Catches/stumpings	137/–
- Source: CricInfo, 17 April 2023

Christopher Paul Phillipson (born 10 February 1952) is a retired cricketer who played first-class cricket for Sussex County Cricket Club.

Phillipson was born at Vrindaban in India and educated at Ardingly College. He went on to play 168 times for Sussex between 1970 and 1986.
