= 1982 John Player League =

- Administrator(s): Test and County Cricket Board
- Cricket format: Limited overs cricket (40 overs per innings)
- Tournament format(s): League
- Champions: Sussex (1st title)
- Participants: 17
- Matches: 136
- Most runs: 692 Clive Rice (Nottinghamshire)
- Most wickets: 32 Norbert Phillip (Essex)

The 1982 John Player League was the fourteenth competing of what was generally known as the Sunday League. The competition was won for the first time by Sussex County Cricket Club.

== Standings ==
Team	Pld	W	T	L	N/R	A	Pts	R/R
Sussex (C)	16	14	0	1	0	1	58	5.144
Middlesex	16	11	0	4	1	0	46	4.927
Leicestershire	16	9	0	6	1	0	38	4.622
Kent	16	9	0	7	0	0	36	4.877
Essex	16	9	0	7	0	0	36	4.990
Hampshire	16	8	2	6	0	0	36	4.710
Nottinghamshire	16	8	1	6	1	0	36	4.703
Northamptonshire	16	8	0	7	1	0	34	5.226
Somerset	16	8	0	8	0	0	32	5.321
Glamorgan	16	6	0	7	1	2	30	4.746
Lancashire	16	6	1	7	2	0	30	4.762
Derbyshire	16	6	0	9	0	1	26	4.917
Surrey	16	6	1	9	0	0	26	4.575
Gloucestershire	16	5	0	9	0	2	24	4.408
Worcestershire	16	5	0	10	1	0	22	5.007
Yorkshire	16	3	1	10	1	1	18	4.983
Warwickshire	16	3	0	11	1	1	16	4.806
Team marked (C) finished as champions. Source: CricketArchive

== See also ==
Sunday League
