= 1981 John Player League =

- Administrator(s): Test and County Cricket Board
- Cricket format: Limited overs cricket (40 overs per innings)
- Tournament format(s): League
- Champions: Essex (1st title)
- Participants: 17
- Matches: 136
- Most runs: 618 John Wright (Derbyshire)
- Most wickets: 33 Anton Ferreira (Warwickshire)

The 1981 John Player League was the thirteenth competing of what was generally known as the Sunday League. The competition was won for the first time by Essex County Cricket Club.

== Standings ==
Team	Pld	W	T	L	N/R	A	Pts	R/R
Essex (C)	16	12	0	3	1	0	50	4.888
Somerset	16	11	0	5	0	0	44	4.949
Warwickshire	16	10	0	4	0	2	44	5.351
Derbyshire	16	10	0	5	0	1	42	4.571
Sussex	16	8	0	5	0	3	38	5.189
Hampshire	16	8	0	7	0	1	34	4.952
Kent	16	7	1	7	1	0	32	4.480
Surrey	16	7	0	7	1	1	32	4.552
Yorkshire	16	6	0	6	2	2	32	4.757
Glamorgan	16	6	0	8	2	0	28	4.287
Lancashire	16	6	1	8	1	0	28	4.422
Nottinghamshire	16	6	0	8	0	2	28	4.452
Worcestershire	16	7	0	9	0	0	28	4.770
Leicestershire	16	5	0	9	0	2	24	4.346
Middlesex	16	4	0	9	1	2	22	4.862
Gloucestershire	16	3	0	9	3	1	20	4.904
Northamptonshire	16	4	0	11	0	1	18	4.745
Team marked (C) finished as champions. Source: CricketArchive

== See also ==
Sunday League
