= 1981 County Championship =

English cricket tournament

- Dates: 6 May – 15 September 1981
- Administrator: England and Wales Cricket Board
- Cricket format: First-class cricket
- Tournament format: League system
- Champions: Nottinghamshire (3rd title)
- Participants: 17
- Matches: 187
- Most runs: Zaheer Abbas, (Gloucestershire); 2,230
- Most wickets: Richard Hadlee, (Nottinghamshire); 105

The 1981 Schweppes County Championship was the 82nd officially organised running of the County Championship. Nottinghamshire won the Championship title.

The number of points awarded for a win was increased to 16. The Championship was sponsored by Schweppes for the fourth time.

== Table ==
- 16 points for a win
- 8 points to each team for a tie
- 8 points to team still batting in a match in which scores finish level
- Bonus points awarded in the first 100 overs of the first innings
  - Batting: 150 runs - 1 point, 200 runs - 2 points 250 runs - 3 points, 300 runs - 4 points
  - Bowling: 3-4 wickets - 1 point, 5-6 wickets - 2 points 7-8 wickets - 3 points, 9-10 wickets - 4 points
- No bonus points awarded in a match starting with less than 8 hours' play remaining. A one-innings match is played, with the winner gaining 12 points.
- Position determined by points gained. If equal, then decided on most wins.
- Each team plays 22 matches.

	Team	P	W	L	D	Bat	Bowl	Pts
1	Nottinghamshire	22	11	4	7	56	72	304
2	Sussex	22	11	3	8	58	68	302
3	Somerset	22	10	2	10	54	65	279
4	Middlesex	22	9	3	10	49	64	257
5	Essex	22	8	4	10	62	64	254
6	Surrey	22	7	5	10	52	72	236
7	Hampshire	22	6	7	9	45	65	206
8	Leicestershire	22	6	6	10	45	58	199
9	Kent	22	5	7	10	51	58	189
10	Yorkshire	22	5	9	8	41	66	187
11	Worcestershire	22	5	9	8	44	52	172
12	Derbyshire	22	4	7	11	51	57	172
13	Gloucestershire	22	4	3	15	51	55	170
14	Glamorgan	22	3	10	9	50	69	167
15	Northamptonshire	22	3	6	13	51	67	166
16	Lancashire	22	4	7	11	47	57	164
17	Warwickshire	22	2	11	9	56	47	135
