= Derek Taylor (cricketer) =

English cricketer (born 1942)

Personal information
- Full name: Derek John Somerset Taylor
- Born: 12 November 1942 (age 84); Amersham, Buckinghamshire, England
- Batting: Right-handed
- Role: Wicket-keeper
- Relatives: Mike Taylor (twin brother)

Domestic team information
- Years: Team
- 1961–1963: Buckinghamshire
- 1966–1969: Surrey
- 1970–1982: Somerset
- 1970/71–1971/72: Griqualand West
- First-class debut: 15 June 1966 Surrey v Cambridge University
- Last First-class: 11 September 1982 Somerset v Lancashire
- List A debut: 22 June 1966 Surrey v Hampshire
- Last List A: 12 September 1982 Somerset v Lancashire

Career statistics
Competition	First-class	List A
Matches	302	265
Runs scored	7,404	2,091
Batting average	22.78	19.72
100s/50s	4/30	0/4
Top score	179	93
Balls bowled	0	–
Wickets	–	–
Bowling average	–	–
5 wickets in innings	–	–
10 wickets in match	–	–
Best bowling	–	–
Catches/stumpings	622/84	236/43
- Source: ESPNcricinfo, 27 July 2020

Derek John Somerset Taylor (born 12 November 1942) is a former English cricketer who played for Somerset, Surrey and Griqualand West as a wicket-keeper batsman.

Taylor's twin brother Mike Taylor played for Nottinghamshire and Hampshire.

== Career ==
Taylor holds the record for the most dismissals in a List A cricket match, tied with Steve Palframan and Jamie Pipe, having taken eight catches in a 1982 game against British Universities.

Starting with Amersham Hill CC, Chesham CC, and the Buckinghamshire Young Amateurs, Derek then played for Buckinghamshire in the Minor Counties before turning professional with Surrey in 1964. He spent six seasons at the oval, mainly in the 2nd eleven, winning the Championship twice and gaining his County Cap in 1969 against New Zealand.

In 1970, Derek joined Somerset, where he played for 13 years. His accomplishments there included four one-day titles, including three wins at Lords, guiding Somerset to victory over the Australians for the first time at Bath in Brian Close's absence, a career best 179 at St Helens, Swansea including the then fourth wicket record for Somerset, and the record eight catches in 1982 for List A cricket.
