= 1963 Gillette Cup final =

1963 Gillette Cup Final
- The Sussex team pose with the trophy
- Event: 1963 Gillette Cup
Sussex	Worcestershire
168	154
60.2	63.2
- Sussex won by 14 runs
- Date: 7 September 1963
- Venue: Lord's, London
- Man of the match: Norman Gifford
- Umpires: Fred Gardner and Frank Lee
- Attendance: 24,000

The 1963 Gillette Cup Final was a cricket match between Sussex County Cricket Club and Worcestershire County Cricket Club played on 7 September 1963 at Lord's in London. It was the first final of the Gillette Cup, which was the first English domestic knock-out competition between first-class teams. Sussex won the match by fourteen runs.

== Background ==
During the 1950s and early 1960s, county cricket clubs were struggling to get good attendances at County Championship matches, and although The World of Cricket described there being "misgivings among the more conservatively minded", the 65-overs-a-side Knockout Cup was played for the first time in 1963. Sussex overcame Kent, Yorkshire and Northamptonshire to reach the final, while Worcestershire beat Surrey, Glamorgan and Lancashire.

== Match ==
=== Summary ===
The final was played in front of a sell-out crowd of 24,000 people at Lord's Cricket Ground in London on 7 September 1963. Sussex won the toss, and their captain Ted Dexter elected to bat first. Jim Parks, Jr. was Sussex' leading run-scorer, with 57 runs, and his team were bowled out for 168, with just under 5 of their allocated 65 overs remaining. In their response, Worcestershire had to contend with drizzle and fading light while they were batting. Dexter made use of the conditions, by selecting his fastest bowler, John Snow, to bowl. Worcestershire struggled to play him, and Snow took three wickets, and only conceded 13 runs across his eight overs. A partnership between Worcestershire's final two batsmen gave them some hope of victory, but despite scoring 21 runs together, they did not manage to overhaul Sussex's total, and Sussex won the match by 14 runs to become the first winners of the Gillette Cup. Worcestershire's Norman Gifford was chosen by adjudicator Frank Woolley as Man of the Match.

=== Scorecard ===
7 September 1963
scorecard

Sussex; 168 all out (60.2 overs)	v	Worcestershire; 154 all out (63.2 overs)
Jim Parks, Jr. 57; Norman Gifford 4/33 (15)		Roy Booth 33*; John Snow 3/13 (8)

Sussex won by 14 runs
Lord's Cricket Ground, London
Umpires: Fred Gardner and Frank Lee
Player of the match: Norman Gifford (Worcestershire)

== Reaction ==
Dexter drew a lot of criticism for his tactics throughout the competition, and particularly in the final. The competition had been devised to attract people to cricket, and was intended to promote more attacking cricket. However, Dexter advocated a very defensive style of play, asking his bowlers to bowl at the stumps, and when Worcestershire had needed to score boundaries, he placed all nine of his fielders on the boundary edge to restrict their chances of doing so. The Daily Mirror's Brian Chapman claimed that Dexter's "tactics could eventually kill a great idea", and The Times echoed the sentiment, saying "the means on the way had, at times, been a perversion of positive cricket."
