= Clive Rice =

South African cricketer

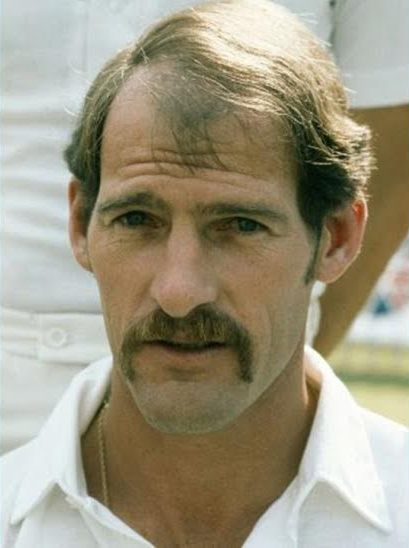

Personal information
- Full name: Clive Edward Butler Rice
- Born: 23 July 1949; Johannesburg, South Africa
- Died: 28 July 2015 (aged 66); Johannesburg, South Africa
- Batting: Right-handed
- Bowling: Right-arm fast-medium
- Role: All-rounder
- Relatives: Philip Bower (grandfather)

International information
- National side: South Africa
- ODI debut (cap 7): 10 November 1991 v India
- Last ODI: 14 November 1991 v India

Domestic team information
- Years: Team
- 1970/71–1991/92: Transvaal
- 1975–1987: Nottinghamshire
- 1988–1989: Scotland
- 1992/93–1993/94: Natal

Career statistics
Competition	ODI	FC	LA
Matches	3	482	479
Runs scored	26	26,331	13,474
Batting average	13.00	40.95	37.32
100s/50s	0/0	48/137	11/79
Top score	14	246	169
Balls bowled	138	48,628	17,738
Wickets	2	930	517
Bowling average	57.00	22.49	22.63
5 wickets in innings	0	23	6
10 wickets in match	0	1	0
Best bowling	1/46	7/62	6/18
Catches/stumpings	0/–	401/–	175/–
- Source: CricketArchive, 18 January 2008

Clive Edward Butler Rice (23 July 1949 – 28 July 2015) was a South African international cricketer. An all-rounder, Rice ended his First Class cricket career with a batting average of 40.95 and a bowling average of 22.49. He captained Nottinghamshire County Cricket Club from 1979 to 1987.

His career coincided directly with South Africa's sporting isolation, and his international experience was limited to his post-prime days. He played three One Day Internationals for South Africa following the country's return from sporting isolation. He was controversially left out of the squads for the one-off Test against West Indies and the 1992 Cricket World Cup. Despite this he is widely regarded as one of the best all-rounders of his generation, alongside Imran Khan, Ian Botham, Kapil Dev and his county team-mate Richard Hadlee.

On 28 July 2015, Rice died in hospital at the age of 66, suffering from a brain tumour.

== Early and personal life ==
Rice was born to Patrick and Angela on 23 July 1949 in Johannesburg, Transvaal Province, Union of South Africa. Rice's grandfather Philip Salkeld Syndercombe Bower played cricket for Oxford University while his brother Richard was selected for Transvaal but was unable to play due to exams.

Rice worked for a street-lighting company called Envirolight in Johannesburg and his wife Susan heads a Sports Tour and Bush safari company. The couple have two children.

== Career ==
=== Domestic career ===
Rice began his career with Transvaal in 1969 and was called up for South Africa's (ultimately cancelled) tour of Australia in 1971–72. In South African domestic cricket he successfully led the 1980s Transvaal, known as the "Mean Machine", to three Castle Currie Cups and other one-day competition victories. Toward the end of his playing career, he played for and captained Natal.

He became the first cricketer to score 5000 runs and to take 500 wickets in List A cricket history

=== Career in English domestic cricket ===
Rice played for Nottinghamshire in the English County Championship in a team that also featured internationals Richard Hadlee and Derek Randall. As captain, he led the team to the County Championship title in both 1981 and 1987, winning the prestigious award of being named a Wisden cricketer of the year for his exploits in 1981. He later played for Scotland.

=== International cricket ===
Along with other South African players, Rice was excluded from international cricket by the sporting boycott of South Africa due to his country's policy of apartheid.

Rice joined World Series Cricket setup in 1978-79. He played three Supertests for the WSC World XI, enjoying three victories. In the first one, against Australian XI, the World XI were 5-53 when Rice came to the wicket, and scored 41, taking the World XI to 6-138 - these runs proved crucial in the team's victory. Against the West Indies XI, Rice made 83 and took three wickets as WSC World XI won by an innings and 44 runs. In his third Supertest, against Australia, Rice took three tickets.

During the 1980s, a number of rebel cricket teams visited South Africa to play unofficial "Test" matches. Rice captained the home team for the majority of these fixtures.

In 1985-86 an Australian XI toured. The South Africa XI won the 3-match test series 1-0, and the 6-match one-day series 4-2. In the third test, Rice took a hattrick in Australia's second innings. In the 2nd one-day match, Rice scored 91 off 93 balls; in the third he made 78 and took 3-25; in the fourth he scored 44 and took 4-45; in the 6th he made 95.

Rice was able to make his debut in official international cricket in 1991, when, aged 42, he played in—and captained—South Africa's first One Day International, in a match against India at Eden Gardens, Calcutta. Rice finished with averages of 13 with the bat and 57 with the ball from his three One Day International matches.

Alongside Jimmy Cook, he was controversially dropped for the 1992 Cricket World Cup squad. He was widely regarded as the most credible candidate for team captain due to his decades of experience. Rice initially refused to comment on his omission, but was reported to have been visibly upset when the team was announced. The Johannesburg Sunday Times conducted a poll which showed that 47 out of South Africa's top 66 cricketers opposed the exclusion of Rice and other senior players. Some were quoted in the paper as saying the selectors were "clowns" and they should resign for the omission of three "automatic choices". Peter van der Merwe, the chairman of the selection panel, dismissed the poll and said it did not concern him. After being left out of the world cup squad, which he attributed to personal differences with van der Merwe, Rice stood down as Transvaal captain for the remainder of the domestic season in order to be a commentator for the world cup on the Nine Network in Australia.

In 1993 he captained the South African team at that years Hong Kong Sixes tournament.

=== Later career ===
In 1995, after just one season since retiring from first-class cricket, Rice was appointed to South Africa's national selection panel on the nomination of the Transvaal Cricket Board. He worked as coach for Nottinghamshire and encouraged Kevin Pietersen to leave South Africa to qualify for England.

== Opinions about match fixing ==
In September 2010, Rice claimed in an interview to Fox News that betting syndicates were involved in the deaths of Pakistan coach Bob Woolmer and former South African captain Hansie Cronje. Fox Sports quoted Rice as saying: "These mafia betting syndicates do not stop at anything and they do not care who gets in their way." Former Pakistan coach Geoff Lawson had earlier told Fox Sports that match-fixing "might not be about money, it might be about extortion, and all the things that go on".

== Illness and death ==
Rice was diagnosed with a brain tumour in September 1998 and received treatment in Hanover, Germany. In February 2015, Rice collapsed at his house in Johannesburg and scans at a local hospital found that, as his tumour was located deep down, it could not be removed by a neurosurgeon by invasive surgery. Rice then went to Health Care Global in Bangalore, India and received robotic radiation treatment to have the tumour removed. The surgery was successful and Rice returned home in March 2015. On the morning of 28 July 2015, Rice died from sepsis in the Morningside hospital in Johannesburg.

== Sources ==
- Sproat, I. (1988) The Cricketers' Who's Who 1988, Willow Books: London. ISBN 0 00 218285 8.

Sporting positions
Preceded by Mike Smedley	Nottinghamshire County cricket captain 1979–1987	Succeeded by Tim Robinson
Preceded by none	South African ODI cricket captain 1991	Succeeded by Kepler Wessels
