= Peter Roebuck =

English cricketer

Personal information
- Full name: Peter Michael Roebuck
- Born: 6 March 1956; Oddington, Oxfordshire, England
- Died: 12 November 2011 (aged 55); Newlands, Cape Town, South Africa
- Batting: Right-handed
- Bowling: Right-arm off break
- Role: Batsman
- Relatives: Paul Roebuck (brother)

Domestic team information
- Years: Team
- 1974–1991: Somerset
- 1975–1977: Cambridge University
- 1992–2002: Devon
- First-class debut: 21 August 1974 Somerset v Warwickshire
- Last First-class: 23 August 1991 Somerset v Yorkshire
- List A debut: 3 May 1975 Combined Universities v Worcestershire
- Last List A: 13 September 2001 Devon v Bedfordshire

Career statistics
Competition	First-class	List A
Matches	335	298
Runs scored	17,558	7,244
Batting average	37.27	29.81
100s/50s	33/93	5/38
Top score	221*	120
Balls bowled	7,606	1,785
Wickets	72	51
Bowling average	49.16	25.09
5 wickets in innings	1	0
10 wickets in match	0	0
Best bowling	6/50	4/11
Catches/stumpings	162/–	74/–
- Source: Cricinfo, 21 August 2009

Peter Michael Roebuck (6 March 1956 – 12 November 2011) was an English cricketer who later became an Australian newspaper columnist and radio commentator.

A consistent county performer with over 25,000 runs, and "one of the better English openers of the 1980s", Roebuck captained the English county side Somerset between 1986 and 1988. During 1989, Roebuck also captained an England XI one-day cricket team in two matches. His post-playing career as an erudite writer earned him great acclaim as a journalist with the Sunday Times and later as an author.

Roebuck died by suicide in Cape Town, South Africa, on 12 November 2011 after being asked by police to answer questions about an allegation of sexual assault. A book by Tim Lane and Elliot Cartledge titled Chasing Shadows – The Life and Death of Peter Roebuck was published in October 2015.

== Early life ==
Roebuck was born in the village of Oddington, outside Oxford, on 6 March 1956, the son of two schoolteachers and one of six children; he attended Millfield School where his mother was a mathematics teacher and his father an economics teacher. The headmaster, Jack Meyer, a former Somerset County Cricket Club Captain, had offered his parents employment at the school so that they could afford the fees. Meyer was an unconventional headmaster who wanted to encourage cricket talent. On entering Meyer's office for the interview for admission, Roebuck found an orange flying through the air towards him; he caught it, and in his book It Never Rains speculated whether he would have got into Millfield if he had dropped it. He later studied law at Emmanuel College, Cambridge, graduating with first-class honours in 1977. However he never practised law, finding it too confining.

== Cricket career ==
Roebuck was a right-handed batsman, often used as an opener, and occasionally bowled right-arm offspin. He played for Somerset's second eleven at the age of 13 and regular first-class cricket from 1974 until his retirement in 1991. He later played Minor Counties cricket for Devon.

In 335 first-class matches he scored 17,558 runs at an average of 37.27, making 33 centuries with a highest score of 221*, and took 72 wickets at 49.16. In 298 one-day matches, he scored 7244 runs at 29.81 while taking 51 wickets at 25.09.

On the county circuit, Roebuck's nickname was Rupert. This arose when the Essex captain, Keith Fletcher, once addressed him as Rupert, in the mistaken belief that it was actually his name.

Roebuck was involved in Somerset's limited-over successes of the years 1979-83. In the Benson and Hedges Cup final of 1981 he helped Viv Richards in a partnership of 105 in Somerset's victory, and the following year, as Somerset successfully defended the title, helped the same player in an unbroken stand of the same amount, finishing as top-scorer.

In 1988 Roebuck was named as one of the Wisden Cricketers of the Year.

=== 1986 controversy ===
Roebuck became a controversial figure in 1986 when, at the end of his first season as captain of Somerset, he was instrumental in the county's decision not to renew the contracts of its two overseas players, Viv Richards and Joel Garner, whose runs and wickets had brought the county much success in the previous eight years.

Roebuck and his supporters argued that both Richards and Garner were now ageing, that individually and collectively their contributions had declined dramatically and that younger overseas and home-grown players should be recruited to replace them. They cited the recent performance of the team in the County Championship – namely, last in 1985 and second last in 1986 – and their failure in one-day competitions since winning the NatWest Bank Trophy in 1983. A decision was precipitated by a fear that Martin Crowe of New Zealand, who had deputised as the county's overseas player in 1984 when Richards and Garner were with a West Indies touring party, might instead join Essex for 1987.

Opposition to the decision not to re-employ Richards and Garner came loudest from Somerset's English-born star, the all-rounder Ian Botham, who refused a new contract for himself and joined Worcestershire. In the event, under Roebuck's captaincy and with Crowe and Steve Waugh of Australia as overseas players, Somerset improved a little in 1987, though they remained among the weaker counties for a further six seasons; Botham and Richards meanwhile went on to achieve a measure of success with new counties (respectively Worcestershire and Glamorgan). After many years of bitterness and the eventual removal of Roebuck from the club, Richards was honoured with the naming of a set of entrance gates and a stand after him at the County Ground, Taunton.

=== Later career ===
Roebuck was canvassed by some, including (according to Cricinfo) Ray Illingworth, as a possible successor to David Gower as England captain after England's heavy defeat in the Ashes in 1989, and led a representative England XI (including Derek Pringle, Rob Bailey, and future captains Nasser Hussain and Alec Stewart) in two limited-over matches against a Netherlands XI in 1989. However in the first such match "Roebuck had not realised that a 55-minute rain delay did not reduce the overs and England, unable to see in the darkness, lost by three runs". Although Roebuck led the side to comfortable victory in the second match the following day, Roebuck would never play a full international for England.

== Post-cricket career ==
=== Commentator and journalist ===
His behind-the-scenes journal of Somerset's progress during the 1983 season, It Never Rains, first established him as a talented writer on the sport.

Having retired as a player and relocated to Australia, Roebuck wrote columns for The Sydney Morning Herald, The Age (Melbourne) and ESPNcricinfo, as well as commentating for the ABC radio cricket coverage in Australia. He became known for wearing his trademark straw sunhat at all times, even inside the commentary box.

He felt there was too much nationalism in Australian cricket writing and that it should be avoided at all costs when analysing the game. He was one of the few global voices in the game without allegiance to any nation, team or player.

A known traditionalist, he was one of the last journalists in cricket to acquire a laptop and mobile phone and expressed surprise and delight when he found them quite useful.

Roebuck was often critical of the successful Australian cricket team and, in particular, the Australian captain Ricky Ponting. Following Australia's narrow victory in the second Test against India at the Sydney Cricket Ground in 2007–08, Roebuck accused the Australians of "bad sportsmanship and triumphalism", describing the Australian team as a "pack of wild dogs" and writing that Ponting has "shown not the slightest interest in the well-being of the game, not the slightest sign of diplomatic skills, not a single mark of respect for his accomplished and widely admired opponents."

Roebuck was described as an astute judge of cricketers, a contrarian and a master wordsmith, and his writing was described as lean, erudite, fluent, perceptive and vibrant.

=== Philanthropy ===
In 2006, Roebuck established the Learning for a Better World Trust (LBW) to help students from cricket-playing developing countries to complete tertiary education. He resigned from the Trust in 2008. In addition to supporting the LBW Trust, Roebuck spent A$100,000 of his own money to help put African youths through high school and university. Psychology Maziwisa, a Zimbabwean lawyer Roebuck had mentored and whose education he had funded, wrote a tribute in which he stated that Roebuck had over 35 Zimbabweans in his care at the time of his death, and he had spent approximately $500,000 of his own money to "realise African dreams".

== Personal life ==
Roebuck spent his last years residing in Straw Hat Farm, Pietermaritzburg, South Africa, as well as Bondi, Sydney, where he owned two houses. He grew increasingly estranged from England, but kept in regular touch with his mother and siblings. He became an Australian citizen. His colleague Malcolm Knox said of Roebuck that "nothing could rile him more, after he became an Australian citizen, than to be described as an Englishman of any kind, even a former one."

In 2005 Roebuck's father wrote that Peter is an "unconventional loner with an independent outlook on life, an irreverent sense of humour and sometimes a withering tongue."

Very much an introvert, he was a solitary person who preferred to read a book while eating alone rather than spend time in the company of his colleagues.

=== Assault conviction ===
In 1999, while working as a commentator in South Africa, Roebuck met three cricketers, all aged 19, and offered to coach them, inviting them to live at his home in England. He warned them beforehand that he would use corporal punishment if they failed to obey his "house rules". He caned all three men on their (clothed) buttocks at different times for misbehaviour and in 2001 was given a suspended jail sentence after pleading guilty to three charges of common assault. He told the court, "Obviously I misjudged the mood and that was my mistake and my responsibility and I accept that." Henk Lindeque, one of Roebuck's victims, stated that he held no ill will toward Roebuck and was saddened to hear of his death.

== Death ==
Roebuck arrived in Cape Town, South Africa, on 7 November 2011 to report on a Test match between South Africa and Australia for The Sydney Morning Herald and the Australian Broadcasting Corporation (ABC). He was staying at the Southern Sun Hotel in Newlands, Cape Town, on 12 November, when the South African Police Service entered the hotel, claiming to desire to speak to him about an alleged sexual assault on a 26-year-old Zimbabwean man.

After requesting that he be allowed to go to his room to change his clothes, Roebuck called the ABC's Jim Maxwell in his hotel room and asked him to find him a lawyer and to then come to his hotel room.

At 9.15 pm, Roebuck died after jumping from the sixth floor of the Southern Sun Hotel. He landed on the awning outside the entrance to the hotel, causing what was described by Australian cricket writer Peter Lalor, who later saw Roebuck's body at the mortuary, as "serious head trauma". Roebuck's body was taken to the Salt River State mortuary in the early hours of the next morning. A statement issued by South African police stated that Roebuck had committed suicide and that an inquest into the matter would be held. In February 2024, over twelve years after his death, an inquest held at Cheshire Coroner's Court in England concluded that Roebuck had taken his own life; the senior coroner stated that the substantial delay was partly a result of "waiting to find out about a renewed hearing in South Africa which hasn't come to pass".

Students residing at Roebuck's farm in Natal, where he lived for six months of every year, stated that no corporal punishment was ever meted out at the residence.

In January 2012 Australian journalist Adam Shand published extensive research on Roebuck's dealings with the young men who lived with him in South Africa.

In 1990 Roebuck wrote the foreword to David Frith's By His Own Hand: A Study of Cricket's Suicides. In it he wrote, 'Since It Never Rains... some people have predicted a gloomy end for this writer. One former colleague said so to my face in September 1986. It will not be so.'

== Legacy ==
Roebuck was Ed Cowan's mentor. Cowan's maiden Test century came in the First Test between Australia and South Africa at the Gabba, Brisbane, on 12 November 2012, a year to the day after Roebuck's death. Cowan dedicated the century to Roebuck's memory.

== Biography ==
In mid-2014 a former colleague of Roebuck's at the Australian Broadcasting Corporation, commentator Tim Lane, and writer Elliot Cartledge were commissioned to research his life story and investigate the circumstances of his death. Associates of Roebuck such as Vic Marks, Steve Waugh, Ian Chappell, Jonathan Agnew and Matthew Engel are quoted. The Zimbabwean man at the centre of the controversy that led to Roebuck's death, Itai Gondo, provided testimony. The book, Chasing Shadows – The Life and Death of Peter Roebuck, was released in the UK, Australia and New Zealand in late 2015.

== Publications ==
- Slices of Cricket, Unwin, (1982) ISBN 0-04-796088-4, ISBN 978-0-04-796088-8
- It Never Rains: A Cricketer's Lot, Unwin, (1984) ISBN 0-04-796096-5; ISBN 978-0-04-796096-3;
- It Sort of Clicks (with Ian Botham), (1986) ISBN 0-947072-32-2, ISBN 978-0-947072-32-2
- Great Innings, Blitz (1990) ISBN 1-85605-121-8, ISBN 978-1-85605-121-7
- Foreword to By His Own Hand: A Study of Cricket's Suicides by David Frith (1991) ISBN 0-09-174687-6
- Tangled Up in White: Peter Roebuck On Cricket, Hodder & Stoughton, (1992) ISBN 0-340-56618-3, ISBN 978-0-340-56618-3
- From Sammy to Jimmy: History of Somerset County Cricket Club, Partridge Press (1991) ISBN 1-85225-085-2, ISBN 978-1-85225-085-0
- Sometimes I Forgot to Laugh (autobiography), Allen & Unwin (2004) ISBN 1-74114-389-6
- It Takes All Sorts: Celebrating Cricket's Colourful Characters, Allen & Unwin, (2005) ISBN 1-74114-542-2
- In It To Win It: The Australian Cricket Supremacy, Allen & Unwin, (2006) ISBN 1-74114-543-0

Sporting positions
Preceded by Ian Botham	Somerset County Cricket Captain; 1986–1988	Succeeded by Vic Marks
