= 1983–84 Australian Tri-Series =

1983–84 World Series
- Date: 8 January 1984 – 12 February 1984
- Location: Australia
- Result: Won by West Indies; 2–0 in final series
Teams
| Australia | Pakistan | West Indies |
Captains
| Kim Hughes | Imran Khan | Clive Lloyd |
Most runs
| Kepler Wessels 495 | Javed Miandad 295 | Desmond Haynes 450 |
Most wickets
| Rodney Hogg 22 | Abdul Qadir 15 | Michael Holding 23 |

The 1983–84 World Series was a One Day International (ODI) cricket tri-series where Australia played host to Pakistan and West Indies. Australia and West Indies reached the Finals, which West Indies won 2–0.

== Uniforms ==
Australia
Australia kit

Pakistan
Pakistan kit

West Indies
West Indies kit

== Points table ==
| Pos | Team | P | W | L | NR | T | Points |
|---|---|---|---|---|---|---|---|
| 1 | West Indies | 10 | 8 | 2 | 0 | 0 | 16 |
| 2 | Australia | 10 | 5 | 4 | 0 | 1 | 11 |
| 3 | Pakistan | 10 | 1 | 8 | 0 | 1 | 3 |

== Result summary ==
8 January 1984
Scorecard

| West Indies; 221/7 (50 overs) | v | Australia; 194 (46 overs) |
| Clive Lloyd 65 (78); Rodney Hogg 3/29 (10 overs) | | Allan Border 84 (109); Malcolm Marshall 2/25 (9 overs) |

West Indies won by 27 runs
Melbourne Cricket Ground, Melbourne
Umpires: Raymond Isherwood and Tony Crafter
Player of the match: Viv Richards (WIN)

- West Indies won the toss and elected to bat
- Greg Matthews (AUS) and Richard S. Gabriel (WIN) made their ODI debut
- West Indies 2 points, Australia 0 points

10 January 1984
Scorecard

| Australia; 264/8 (50 overs) | v | Pakistan; 230/9 (50 overs) |
| Kepler Wessels 92 (123); Sarfraz Nawaz 4/27 (10 overs) | | Javed Miandad 67 (93); Carl Rackemann 3/35 (10 overs) |

Australia won by 34 runs
Sydney Cricket Ground, Sydney
Umpires: Peter McConnell and Steve Randell
Player of the match: Kepler Wessels (AUS)

- Pakistan won the toss and elected to field
- Australia 2 points, Pakistan 0 points

12 January 1984
Scorecard

| Pakistan; 208/8 (50 overs) | v | West Indies; 111 (41.4 overs) |
| Qasim Umar 69 (78); Michael Holding 2/56 (10 overs) | | Jeff Dujon 30 (65); Azeem Hafeez 4/22 (10 overs) |

Pakistan won by 97 runs
Melbourne Cricket Ground, Melbourne
Umpires: Mel Johnson and Steve Randell
Player of the match: Qasim Umar (PAK)

- Pakistan won the toss and elected to bat
- Pakistan 2 points, West Indies 0 points

14 January 1984
Scorecard

| Pakistan; 174/9 (50 overs) | v | West Indies; 175/5 (40.2 overs) |
| Mudassar Nazar 68 (114); Wayne Daniel 3/27 (10 overs) | | Desmond Haynes 53 (100); Mudassar Nazar 2/46 (10 overs) |

West Indies won by 5 wickets
Gabba, Brisbane
Umpires: Raymond Isherwood and Tony Crafter
Player of the match: Mudassar Nazar (PAK)

- Pakistan won the toss and elected to bat
- West Indies 2 points, Pakistan 0 points

15 January 1984
Scorecard

| Pakistan; 184/6 (42 overs) | v | Australia; 15/0 (3.5 overs) |
| Mansoor Akhtar 47 (106); Rodney Hogg 3/34 (8 overs) | | Greg Ritchie 6* (17) |

No result
Gabba, Brisbane
Umpires: Mel Johnson and Dick French

- Pakistan won the toss and elected to bat
- Pakistan 1 point, Australia 1 point

17 January 1984
Scorecard

| West Indies; 223/7 (49 overs) | v | Australia; 195/9 (49 overs) |
| Desmond Haynes 108* (130); Geoff Lawson 3/30 (10 overs) | | David Hookes 35 (60); Wayne Daniel 2/29 (10 overs) |

West Indies won by 28 runs
Sydney Cricket Ground, Sydney
Umpires: Mel Johnson and Tony Crafter
Player of the match: Desmond Haynes (WIN)

- West Indies won the toss and elected to bat
- Match reduced to 49 overs per team
- West Indies 2 points, Australia 0 points

19 January 1984
Scorecard

| Pakistan; 184/8 (50 overs) | v | West Indies; 185/5 (48.3 overs) |
| Qasim Umar 67* (120); Michael Holding 4/26 (10 overs) | | Richie Richardson 53 (94); Abdul Qadir 3/27 (10 overs) |

West Indies won by 5 wickets
Sydney Cricket Ground, Sydney
Umpires: Bruce Martin and Peter McConnell
Player of the match: Richie Richardson (WIN)

- Pakistan won the toss and elected to bat
- West Indies 2 points, Pakistan 0 points

21 January 1984
Scorecard

| Australia; 209/8 (50 overs) | v | Pakistan; 166 (45 overs) |
| Kepler Wessels 86 (118); Abdul Qadir 5/53 (10 overs) | | Javed Miandad 56 (68); Rodney Hogg 4/33 (10 overs) |

Australia won by 43 runs
Melbourne Cricket Ground, Melbourne
Umpires: Bruce Martin and Peter McConnell
Player of the match: Kepler Wessels (AUS)

- Australia won the toss and elected to bat
- Australia 2 points, Pakistan 0 points

22 January 1984
Scorecard

| West Indies; 252/6 (50 overs) | v | Australia; 226 (49.5 overs) |
| Viv Richards 106 (95); Carl Rackemann 2/43 (9 overs) | | Kim Hughes 71 (73); Michael Holding 3/35 (9.5 overs) |

West Indies won by 26 runs
Melbourne Cricket Ground, Melbourne
Umpires: Dick French and Raymond Isherwood
Player of the match: Viv Richards (WIN)

- West Indies won the toss and elected to bat
- West Indies 2 points, Australia 0 points

25 January 1984
Scorecard

| Australia; 244/8 (50 overs) | v | Pakistan; 157 (47.2 overs) |
| Steve Smith 106 (129); Abdul Qadir 3/42 (9 overs) | | Imran Khan 41 (83); Rodney Hogg 4/37 (10 overs) |

Australia won by 87 runs
Sydney Cricket Ground, Sydney
Umpires: Dick French and Raymond Isherwood
Player of the match: Steve Smith (AUS)

- Australia won the toss and elected to bat
- Australia 2 points, Pakistan 0 points

28 January 1984
Scorecard

| Pakistan; 177/8 (50 overs) | v | West Indies; 180/9 (49.1 overs) |
| Wasim Raja 46 (40); Malcolm Marshall 3/28 (9 overs) | | Malcolm Marshall 56* (84); Wasim Raja 3/33 (10 overs) |

West Indies won by 1 wicket
Adelaide Oval, Adelaide
Umpires: Bruce Martin and Dick French
Player of the match: Malcolm Marshall (WIN)

- Pakistan won the toss and elected to bat
- West Indies 2 points, Pakistan 0 points

29 January 1984
Scorecard

| Australia; 165/7 (50 overs) | v | West Indies; 169/4 (45.1 overs) |
| Steve Smith 55 (111); Viv Richards 2/28 (10 overs) | | Gus Logie 49* (62); Allan Border 2/25 (7 overs) |

West Indies won by 6 wickets
Adelaide Oval, Adelaide
Umpires: Bruce Martin and Dick French
Player of the match: Gus Logie (WIN)

- Australia won the toss and elected to bat
- West Indies 2 points, Australia 0 points

30 January 1984
Scorecard

| Australia; 210/8 (50 overs) | v | Pakistan; 140 (45.2 overs) |
| Kepler Wessels 61 (96); Ijaz Faqih 4/43 (10 overs) | | Javed Miandad 34 (29); Carl Rackemann 5/16 (8.2 overs) |

Australia won by 70 runs
Sydney Cricket Ground, Sydney
Umpires: Peter McConnell and Steve Randell
Player of the match: Kepler Wessels (AUS)

- Australia won the toss and elected to bat
- Dean Jones (AUS) made his ODI debut
- Australia 2 points, Pakistan 0 points

4 February 1984
Scorecard

| Pakistan; 182/7 (50 overs) | v | West Indies; 183/3 (45 overs) |
| Mudassar Nazar 54 (117); Joel Garner 2/12 (9 overs) | | Desmond Haynes 78* (140); Mudassar Nazar 2/33 (10 overs) |

West Indies won by 7 wickets
WACA Ground, Perth
Umpires: Dick French and Steve Randell
Player of the match: Viv Richards (WIN)

- Pakistan won the toss and elected to bat
- West Indies 2 points, Pakistan 0 points

5 February 1984
Scorecard

| Australia; 211/8 (50 overs) | v | West Indies; 197 (43.3 overs) |
| Kim Hughes 67 (95); Michael Holding 2/31 (10 overs) | | Michael Holding 64 (39); Carl Rackemann 3/46 (8.3 overs) |

Australia won by 14 runs
WACA Ground, Perth
Umpires: Peter McConnell and Raymond Isherwood
Player of the match: Michael Holding (WIN)

- Australia won the toss and elected to bat
- Australia 2 points, West Indies 0 points

== Final series ==
West Indies won the best of three final series against Australia 2–0.

8 February 1984 (D/N)
Scorecard

| Australia; 160 (44.4 overs) | v | West Indies; 161/1 (43.1 overs) |
| Steve Smith 50 (80); Eldine Baptiste 2/10 (4 overs) | | Richie Richardson 80* (137); Carl Rackemann 1/31 (9 overs) |

West Indies won by 9 wickets
Sydney Cricket Ground, Sydney
Umpires: Dick French and Tony Crafter

- West Indies won the toss and elected to field
- Play began late reducing the match to 46 overs a side

11 February 1984 (D/N)
Scorecard

| West Indies; 222/5 (50 overs) | v | Australia; 222/9 (50 overs) |
| Viv Richards 59 (70); Kepler Wessels 2/29 (5 overs) | | Kepler Wessels 77 (109); Joel Garner 3/39 (10 overs) |

Match tied
Melbourne Cricket Ground, Melbourne
Umpires: Mel Johnson and Peter McConnell

- West Indies won the toss and elected to bat

12 February 1984 (D/N)
Scorecard

| Australia; 212/8 (50 overs) | v | West Indies; 213/4 (45.3 overs) |
| Kim Hughes 65 (88); Joel Garner 5/31 (10 overs) | | Gus Logie 88 (103); Geoff Lawson 2/45 (9 overs) |

West Indies won by 6 wickets
Melbourne Cricket Ground, Melbourne
Umpires: Mel Johnson and Peter McConnell
Player of the match: Joel Garner

- West Indies won the toss and elected to bat
- David Boon (AUS) made his ODI debut
