= 1984–85 Australian Tri-Series =

International cricket tournament

1984–85 World Series
- Date: 6 January – 15 February 1985
- Location: Australia
- Result: Won by West Indies; 2–1 in final series
- Player of the series: Allan Border (Aus); Michael Holding (Win)
Teams
Australia	Sri Lanka	West Indies
Captains
Allan Border	Duleep Mendis	Clive Lloyd
Most runs
Allan Border (590)	Roy Dias (373)	Viv Richards (651)
Most wickets
Craig McDermott (15)	Rumesh Ratnayake (8)	Joel Garner (16); Michael Holding (16)

The 1984–85 World Series was a One Day International (ODI) cricket tri-series where Australia played host to Sri Lanka and the West Indies. Australia and West Indies reached the Finals, which West Indies won 2–1. Sri Lanka and West Indies would not contest the tri-series again until the 1995-96 season.

== Points table ==
Team	P	W	L	T	NR	Pts	RR
West Indies	10	10	0	0	0	20	5.267
Australia	10	4	6	0	0	8	4.793
Sri Lanka	10	1	9	0	0	2	3.975

== Uniforms ==
Australia
Australia kit

Sri Lanka
Sri Lanka kit

West Indies
West Indies kit

== Result summary ==
6 January 1985
Scorecard

Australia; 240/6 (50 overs)	v	West Indies; 241/3 (44.5 overs)
AR Border 73 (101); J Garner 3/41 (10 overs)		DL Haynes 123* (130); MJ Bennett 1/23 (10 overs)

West Indies won by 7 wickets
Melbourne Cricket Ground, Melbourne
Umpires: AR Crafter and PJ McConnell
Player of the match: DL Haynes (WI)

- West Indies won the toss and elected to field
- CJ McDermott and SP O'Donnell (both AUS) made their ODI debuts

8 January 1985 (D/N)
Scorecard

Sri Lanka; 239/7 (49 overs)	v	Australia; 240/4 (46.2 overs)
SAR Silva 68 (109); RM Hogg 4/47 (10 overs)		AR Border 79* (82); ALF de Mel 2/59 (9.3 overs)

Australia won by 6 wickets
Sydney Cricket Ground, Sydney
Umpires: RA French and PJ McConnell
Player of the match: AR Border (AUS)

- Sri Lanka won the toss and elected to bat
- The match was reduced to 49 overs per side

10 January 1985
Scorecard

Sri Lanka; 197/7 (50 overs)	v	West Indies; 198/2 (40.4 overs)
LRD Mendis 56 (48); J Garner 2/19 (10 overs)		CG Greenidge 61 (107); DS de Silva 1/29 (10 overs)

West Indies won by 8 wickets
TCA Ground, Hobart
Umpires: RC Isherwood and SG Randell
Player of the match: LRD Mendis (SL)

- West Indies won the toss and elected to field
- CA Walsh (WI) made his ODI debut

12 January 1985
Scorecard

West Indies; 270/6 (50 overs)	v	Sri Lanka; 180 (48.1 overs)
IVA Richards 98 (98); VB John 2/52 (10 overs)		RL Dias 80 (109); MA Holding 3/38 (10 overs)

West Indies won by 90 runs
Brisbane Cricket Ground, Woolloongabba, Brisbane
Umpires: RA French and MW Johnson
Player of the match: IVA Richards (WI)

- Sri Lanka won the toss and elected to field

13 January 1985
Scorecard

Australia; 191 (50 overs)	v	West Indies; 195/5 (37.4 overs)
KC Wessels 47 (75); IVA Richards 3/38 (10 overs)		CH Lloyd 52* (61); CJ McDermott 2/47 (9 overs)

West Indies won by 5 wickets
Brisbane Cricket Ground, Woolloongabba, Brisbane
Umpires: MW Johnson and SG Randell
Player of the match: CH Lloyd (WI)

- West Indies won the toss and elected to field

15 January 1985 (D/N)
Scorecard

Australia; 200/5 (50 overs)	v	West Indies; 201/5 (43.3 overs)
KC Wessels 63 (133); WW Davis 1/31 (10 overs)		IVA Richards 103* (122); CJ McDermott 3/30 (10 overs)

West Indies won by 5 wickets
Sydney Cricket Ground, Sydney
Umpires: RC Isherwood and SG Randell
Player of the match: IVA Richards (WI)

- Australia won the toss and elected to bat
- RG Holland (AUS) made his ODI debut.

17 January 1985 (D/N)
Scorecard

West Indies; 267/3 (50 overs)	v	Sri Lanka; 202/5 (50 overs)
CG Greenidge 67 (84); DS de Silva 1/48 (10 overs)		RL Dias 65* (102); MA Holding 2/32 (10 overs)

West Indies won by 65 runs
Sydney Cricket Ground, Sydney
Umpires: MW Johnson and BE Martin
Player of the match: CG Greenidge (WI)

- West Indies won the toss and elected to bat

19 January 1985
Scorecard

Australia; 226/9 (50 overs)	v	Sri Lanka; 230/6 (49.2 overs)
WB Phillips 67 (75); RJ Ratnayake 4/37 (10 overs)		RL Dias 48 (64); RM Hogg 2/31 (10 overs)

Sri Lanka won by 4 wickets
Melbourne Cricket Ground, Melbourne
Umpires: RA French and MW Johnson
Player of the match: RJ Ratnayake (SL)

- Sri Lanka won the toss and elected to field

20 January 1985
Scorecard

West Indies; 271/7 (50 overs)	v	Australia; 206/9 (50 overs)
IVA Richards 74 (61); SP O'Donnell 2/40 (10 overs)		AR Border 61 (80); MD Marshall 2/29 (9 overs)

West Indies won by 65 runs
Melbourne Cricket Ground, Melbourne
Umpires: RC Isherwood and PJ McConnell
Player of the match: IVA Richards (WI)

- Australia won the toss and elected to field

23 January 1985 (D/N)
Scorecard

Sri Lanka; 240/6 (50 overs)	v	Australia; 242/7 (47.1 overs)
PA de Silva 81* (87); KC Wessels 2/61 (10 overs)		KC Wessels 82 (97); VB John 2/35 (10 overs)

Australia won by 3 wickets
Sydney Cricket Ground, Sydney
Umpires: AR Crafter and SG Randell
Player of the match: KC Wessels (AUS)

- Australia won the toss and elected to field

26 January 1985
Scorecard

Sri Lanka; 204/6 (50 overs)	v	West Indies; 205/2 (37.2 overs)
RL Dias 66 (107); WW Davis 3/21 (10 overs)		CG Greenidge 110* (128); A Ranatunga 1/34 (8 overs)

West Indies won by 8 wickets
Adelaide Oval, Adelaide
Umpires: RA French and BE Martin
Player of the match: CG Greenidge (WI)

- West Indies won the toss and elected to field

27 January 1985
Scorecard

Australia; 200/9 (50 overs)	v	West Indies; 201/4 (43.4 overs)
GM Wood 104* (142); J Garner 3/17 (10 overs)		IVA Richards 51 (74); CJ McDermott 2/37 (7 overs)

West Indies won by 6 wickets
Adelaide Oval, Adelaide
Umpires: AR Crafter and MW Johnson
Player of the match: J Garner (WI)

- West Indies won the toss and elected to field
- RJ McCurdy (AUS) made his ODI debut

28 January 1985
Scorecard

Australia; 323/2 (50 overs)	v	Sri Lanka; 91 (35.5 overs)
AR Border 118* (88); SHU Karnain 2/56 (8 overs)		SHU Karnain 21 (67); RJ McCurdy 3/19 (5 overs)

Australia won by 232 runs
Adelaide Oval, Adelaide
Umpires: RC Isherwood and BE Martin
Player of the match: AR Border (AUS)

- Sri Lanka won the toss and elected to field

2 February 1985
Scorecard

West Indies; 309/6 (50 overs)	v	Sri Lanka; 227/6 (50 overs)
HA Gomes 101 (89); VB John 2/44 (10 overs)		SAR Silva 85 (96); IVA Richards 2/47 (10 overs)

West Indies won by 82 runs
WACA Ground, Perth
Umpires: AR Crafter and SG Randell
Player of the match: HA Gomes (WI)

- Sri Lanka won the toss and elected to field

3 February 1985
Scorecard

Sri Lanka; 171 (44.3 overs)	v	Australia; 172/1 (23.5 overs)
PA de Silva 52 (97); GF Lawson 2/24 (7 overs)		WB Phillips 75* (68); VB John 1/43 (6.5 overs)

Australia won by 9 wickets
WACA Ground, Perth
Umpires: PJ McConnell and BE Martin
Player of the match: SB Smith (AUS)

- Sri Lanka won the toss and elected to bat
- DM Vonhagt (SL) made his ODI debut.

== Final series ==
West Indies won the best of three final series against Australia 2–1.

6 February 1985 (D/N)
Scorecard

Australia; 247/6 (50 overs)	v	West Indies; 221 (47.3 overs)
AR Border 127 (140); J Garner 3/29 (10 overs)		IVA Richards 68 (88); RJ McCurdy 3/40 (9.3 overs)

Australia won by 26 runs
Sydney Cricket Ground, Sydney
Umpires: AR Crafter and MW Johnson

- West Indies won the toss and elected to field

10 February 1985
Scorecard

Australia; 271/3 (50 overs)	v	West Indies; 273/6 (49.2 overs)
GM Wood 81 (119); MA Holding 1/41 (10 overs)		AL Logie 60 (56); GF Lawson 2/34 (10 overs)

West Indies won by 4 wickets
Melbourne Cricket Ground, Melbourne
Umpires: RC Isherwood and PJ McConnell

- West Indies won the toss and elected to field

12 February 1985 (D/N)
Scorecard

Australia; 178 (50 overs)	v	West Indies; 179/3 (47 overs)
SP O'Donnell 69 (80); MA Holding 5/26 (10 overs)		DL Haynes 76* (133); IVA Richards 76 (104); CJ McDermott 3/36 (10 overs)

West Indies won by 7 wickets
Sydney Cricket Ground, Sydney
Umpires: RA French and PJ McConnell

- West Indies won the toss and elected to field
- RB Kerr (AUS) made his ODI debut.
