= List of One Day International cricket records =

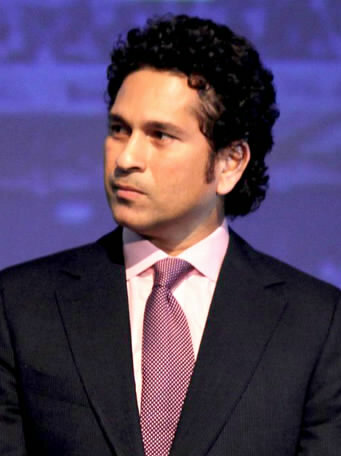
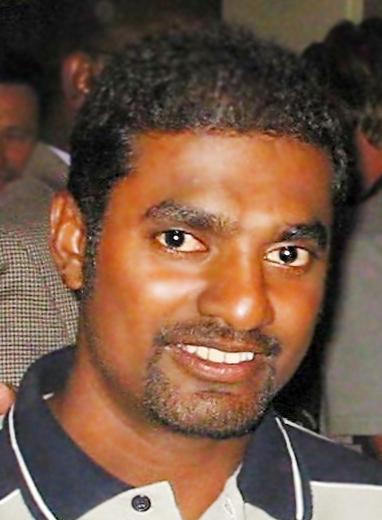
Sachin Tendulkar (left) and Muttiah Muralitharan are the highest run-scorer and wicket-taker in One Day Internationals respectively.

One Day International (ODI) cricket is played between international cricket teams who are full members of the International Cricket Council (ICC) as well as the top four associate members. Unlike Test matches, ODIs consist of one innings per team, having a limit in the number of overs, currently 50 overs per innings – although in the past this has been 55 or 60 overs. ODI matches are a subset of List A cricket.

The earliest match recognised as an ODI was played between England and Australia in January 1971; since when there have been more than 4,900 ODIs played by 29 teams. The frequency of matches has steadily increased, partly because of the increase in the number of ODI-playing countries, and partly as the cricket boards of those nations seek to maximise their revenue with the increased popularity of cricket, a process that dates from the time of the Packer Revolution. In February 2022, in their home series against the West Indies, India played their 1,000th ODI match, becoming the first team to play one thousand matches in this format.

The trend of countries to increase the number of ODI matches they play means that the aggregate lists are dominated by modern players, though this trend is reversing as teams play more Twenty20 Internationals. Indian cricketer Sachin Tendulkar has scored the most runs in ODIs with a total of 18,426. Sri Lankan spinner Muttiah Muralitharan is the highest ODI wicket-taker with a total of 534 wickets. The record for most dismissals by a wicket-keeper is held by Kumar Sangakkara of Sri Lanka while the record for most catches by a fielder is held by Sri Lankan Mahela Jayawardene.

== Listing criteria ==
In general the top five are listed in each category (except when there is a tie for the last place among the five, in which case all the tied record holders are noted).

== Listing notation ==
Team notation

- (300–3) indicates that a team scored 300 runs for three wickets and the innings was closed, either due to a successful run chase or if no overs remained (or are able) to be bowled.
- (300) indicates that a team scored 300 runs and was all out, either by losing all ten wickets or by having one or more batsmen unable to bat and losing the remaining wickets.

Batting notation

- (100*) indicates that a batsman scored 100 runs and was not out.
- (175) indicates that a batsman scored 175 runs and was out after that.

Bowling notation

- (5–40) indicates that a bowler has captured 5 wickets while giving away 40 runs.
- (49.5 overs) indicates that a team bowled 49 complete overs (each of six legal deliveries), and one incomplete over of just five deliveries.

Active players

- Currently active ODI players appear in **boldface**.
- Currently active ODI officials are shown by ‡.

Seasons

- Cricket is played during the summer months in most countries. Domestic cricket seasons in Australia, New Zealand, South Africa, India, Pakistan, Sri Lanka, Bangladesh, Zimbabwe and the West Indies may therefore span two calendar years, and are by convention said to be played in (e.g.) "2008–09". A cricket season in England is described as a single year. e.g. "2009". An international ODI series or tournament may be for a much shorter duration, and Cricinfo treats this issue by stating "as a rule of thumb, any series or tour or tournament which began between the six months of April and September of any given year will appear in the relevant single year season and any that began between October and March will appear in the relevant cross-year season". In the record tables, a two-year span generally indicates that the record was set within a domestic season in one of the above named countries.

== Team records ==
Team	First ODI	Matches	Won	Lost	Tied	NR	%Win*
Afghanistan	19 April 2009	191	96	88	1	6	52.16
Africa XI	17 August 2005	6	1	4	0	1	20.00
Asia XI	10 January 2005	7	4	2	0	1	66.66
Australia	5 January 1971	1,034	624	366	9	35	62.91
Bangladesh	31 March 1986	469	170	288	1	10	37.03
Bermuda	17 May 2006	35	7	28	0	0	20.00
Canada	9 June 1979	118	31	82	1	4	28.07
East Africa	7 June 1975	3	0	3	0	0	0.00
England	5 January 1971	836	416	380	9	31	52.29
Hong Kong	16 July 2004	26	9	16	0	1	36.00
ICC World XI	10 January 2005	4	1	3	0	0	25.00
India	13 July 1974	1,089	580	454	10	45	56.03
Ireland	13 June 2006	219	85	115	3	16	42.61
Jersey	27 March 2023	5	1	4	0	0	20.00
Kenya	18 February 1996	154	42	107	0	5	28.18
Namibia	10 February 2003	91	41	46	1	3	46.49
Nepal	1 August 2018	100	50	47	1	2	51.53
Netherlands	17 February 1996	157	61	88	2	6	41.39
New Zealand	11 February 1973	863	403	408	7	45	49.63
Oman	27 April 2019	82	37	41	2	2	48.12
Pakistan	11 February 1973	1,007	533	444	9	21	54.46
Papua New Guinea	8 November 2014	66	14	51	1	0	21.96
Scotland	16 May 1999	185	87	87	1	10	50.00
South Africa	10 November 1991	704	426	251	6	21	62.81
Sri Lanka	7 June 1975	953	439	466	6	42	48.51
United Arab Emirates	13 April 1994	145	49	94	1	1	34.37
United States	10 September 2004	86	46	37	3	0	54.65
West Indies	5 September 1973	907	432	431	12	32	50.05
Zimbabwe	9 June 1983	592	157	411	8	16	28.03
*The win percentage excludes no results and counts ties as half a win if there was no tiebreaker (otherwise the tiebreker determines a win or loss). Last updated: 22 November 2026

== Result records ==
=== Greatest win margin (by runs) ===
Margin	Teams	Venue	Date	Scorecard
342 runs	England (414–5) beat South Africa (72)	Rose Bowl, Southampton, England	7 September 2025	Scorecard
317 runs	India (390–5) beat Sri Lanka (73)	Greenfield International Stadium, Thiruvananthapuram, India	15 January 2023	Scorecard
309 runs	Australia (399–8) beat Netherlands (90)	Arun Jaitley Stadium, Delhi, India	25 October 2023	Scorecard
304 runs	Zimbabwe (408–6) beat United States (104)	Harare Sports Club, Harare, Zimbabwe	26 June 2023	Scorecard
302 runs	India (357–8) beat Sri Lanka (55)	Wankhede Stadium, Mumbai, India	2 November 2023	Scorecard
Last updated: 7 September 2025

=== Greatest win margin (by balls remaining) ===
Margin	Teams	Venue	Date	Scorecard
277 balls (Note: This match was played with 60 overs per innings)	England (46–2) beat Canada (45)	Old Trafford Cricket Ground, Manchester, England	13 June 1979	Scorecard
274 balls	Sri Lanka (40–1) beat Zimbabwe (38)	Singhalese Sports Club Cricket Ground, Colombo, Sri Lanka	8 December 2001	Scorecard
272 balls	Sri Lanka (37–1) beat Canada (36)	Boland Park, Paarl, South Africa	19 February 2003	Scorecard
268 balls	Nepal (36–2) beat United States (35)	Tribhuvan University International Cricket Ground, Kirtipur, Nepal	12 February 2020	Scorecard
264 balls	New Zealand (95–0) beat Bangladesh (93)	Queenstown Events Centre, Queenstown, New Zealand	31 December 2007	Scorecard
Last updated: 17 September 2023

=== Greatest win margin (by wickets) ===
As of November 2024, teams batting second have won by a margin of ten wickets on 68 occasions.

=== Highest successful chases ===
Score	Target	Team	Opposition	Venue	Date	Scorecard
438–9 (49.5 overs)	435	South Africa	Australia	Wanderers Stadium, Johannesburg, South Africa	12 March 2006	Scorecard
430-8 (49.5 overs)	430	Sri Lanka	England	Rawalpindi Cricket Stadium, Rawalpindi, Pakistan	22 October 2026	Scorecard
406–2 (43.3 overs)	406	India	West Indies	Assam Cricket Association Stadium, Guwahati, India	30 September 2026	Scorecard
374–9 (50 overs) (Note: The match ended in a tie but Netherlands won in super over.)	375	Netherlands	West Indies	Takashinga Sports Club, Harare, Zimbabwe	26 June 2023	Scorecard
372–6 (49.2 overs)	372	South Africa	Australia	Kingsmead Cricket Ground, Durban, South Africa	5 October 2016	Scorecard
Last updated: 22 October 2026

=== Narrowest win margins (by runs) ===
The narrowest margin of victory by teams batting first is one run, which has been achieved in 35 ODIs. Australia have won by this margin on six occasions, which is the most for any team.

=== Narrowest win margins (by balls remaining) ===
Teams batting second have won on the final ball of their innings 40 times, with South Africa winning in such a manner seven times.

=== Narrowest win margins (by wickets) ===
79 ODIs have been won by a single wicket, with the West Indies recording twelve such victories.

=== Lowest totals defended successfully ===
Total	Defended by	Opposition	Venue	Date	Scorecard
122	United States	Oman (65 in 25.3 overs)	Oman Cricket Academy Ground Turf 1, Muscat, Oman	18 February 2025	Scorecard
125	India	Pakistan (87 in 32.5 overs)	Sharjah Cricket Stadium, Sharjah, United Arab Emirates	22 March 1985	Scorecard
127	West Indies	England (125 in 48.2 overs)	Arnos Vale Stadium, Kingstown, Saint Vincent and the Grenadines	4 February 1981	Scorecard
129	Zimbabwe	Afghanistan (126 in 29.3 overs)	Harare Sports Club, Harare, Zimbabwe	21 February 2017	Scorecard
129	South Africa	England (115 in 43.4 overs)	Buffalo Park, East London, South Africa	19 January 1996	Scorecard
Last updated: 18 February 2025
Qualification: Only completed innings in matches that did not have overs reduced are included.

=== Most consecutive wins ===
Wins (Note: No Results are treated the same as losses and ties in this table.)	Team	First win	Last win
21	Australia	England at Hobart, 11 January 2003	West Indies at Port of Spain, 24 May 2003
14	Australia	Sri Lanka at Lucknow, 16 October 2023	England at Leeds, 21 September 2024
13	Sri Lanka	Afghanistan at Sooriyawewa, 4 June 2023	Bangladesh at Colombo, 9 September 2023
12	South Africa (Note: This sequence began after a no-result, and was ended by a no-result. The first win was against England in the final ODI of a seven-game series. The sixth ODI ended with no result, before which South Africa had won the previous three matches. Ignoring this no result, the sequence lasted 15 matches. The last win came against New Zealand in the third ODI of a five-game series. The fourth ODI ended with no result and South Africa went on to win the fifth ODI as well as the first ODI in their next series against India. Ignoring this no result as well, South Africa's winning streak is further extended to 17 matches.)	England at Centurion, 13 February 2005	New Zealand at Port Elizabeth, 30 October 2005
12	Pakistan	India at Jaipur, 18 November 2007	Bangladesh at Dhaka, 8 June 2008
12	South Africa	Ireland at Benoni, 25 September 2016	New Zealand at Hamilton, 19 February 2017
An asterisk (*) denotes an ongoing sequence. Last updated: 21 September 2024

=== Most consecutive defeats ===
Defeats (Note: No results are treated the same as wins and ties in this table.)	Team	First defeat	Last defeat
23	Bangladesh (Note: The 23-game sequence was ended by a no result (ODI 1904). Another four defeats followed, then another no result (ODI 1956), and then Bangladesh's 18 game losing sequence. Ignoring these no results, Bangladesh's 23 game losing sequence and 18 game losing sequence combine with the intervening four defeats into a single losing streak of 45 matches.)	West Indies at Dhaka, 8 October 1999	South Africa at Kimberley, 9 October 2002
22	Bangladesh	Pakistan at Moratuwa, 31 March 1986	India at Mohali, 14 May 1998
18	Zimbabwe	India at Leicester, 11 June 1983	Australia at Hobart, 14 March 1992
18	Bangladesh	South Africa at Bloemfontein, 22 September 2003	England at Dhaka, 12 November 2003
18	Papua New Guinea	Oman at Aberdeen, 14 August 2019	Nepal at Sharjah, 16 March 2022
Last updated: 19 March 2022

=== Most consecutive All out dismissals ===
All out dismissals	Team	First Team	Last Team
14	Sri Lanka	Afghanistan at Hambantota, 4 June 2023	India at Colombo, 12 September 2023
10	Australia	India at Punjab, 2 November 2009	West Indies at Adelaide, 9 February 2010
9	Australia	Afghanistan at Perth, 4 March 2015	England at London, 5 September 2015
Last updated: 15 September 2023

== Team scoring records ==
=== Highest innings totals ===
Score	Team	Opponent	Venue	Date	Scorecard
498–4 (50 overs)	England	Netherlands	VRA Cricket Ground, Amstelveen, Netherlands	17 June 2022	Scorecard
481–6 (50 overs)	England	Australia	Trent Bridge, Nottingham, England	19 June 2018	Scorecard
444–3 (50 overs)	England	Pakistan	Trent Bridge, Nottingham, England	30 August 2016	Scorecard
443–9 (50 overs)	Sri Lanka	Netherlands	VRA Cricket Ground, Amstelveen, Netherlands	4 July 2006	Scorecard
439–2 (50 overs)	South Africa	West Indies	Wanderers Stadium, Johannesburg, South Africa	18 January 2015	Scorecard
Last updated: 17 June 2022

=== Highest innings total batting second ===
Score	Team	Opponent	Venue	Date	Result	Scorecard
438–9 (49.5 overs)	South Africa	Australia	Wanderers Stadium, Johannesburg, South Africa	12 March 2006	Won	Scorecard
430–8 (49.5 overs)	Sri Lanka	England	Rawalpindi Cricket Stadium, Rawalpindi, Pakistan	22 October 2026	Won	Scorecard
411–8 (50 overs)	Sri Lanka	India	Madhavrao Scindia Cricket Ground, Rajkot, India	15 December 2009	Lost	Scorecard
406–2 (43.3 overs)	India	West Indies	Assam Cricket Association Stadium, Guwahati, India	30 September 2026	Won	Scorecard
389 (48 overs)	West Indies	England	National Cricket Stadium, St. George's, Grenada	27 February 2019	Lost	Scorecard
Last updated: 22 October 2026

=== Highest match aggregate ===
Score	Teams	Venue	Date	Scorecard
872–13 (99.5 overs)	Australia (434–4) v South Africa (438–9)	Wanderers Stadium, Johannesburg, South Africa	12 March 2006	Scorecard
859–12 (99.5 overs)	England (429–4) v Sri Lanka (430–8)	Rawalpindi Cricket Stadium, Rawalpindi, Pakistan	22 October 2026	Scorecard
825–15 (100 overs)	India (414–7) v Sri Lanka (411–8)	Madhavrao Scindia Cricket Ground, Rajkot, India	15 December 2009	Scorecard
811–9 (93.3 overs)	West Indies (405-7) v India (406-2)	Assam Cricket Association Stadium, Guwahati, India	30 September 2026	Scorecard
807–16 (98.0 overs)	England (418–6) v West Indies (389)	National Cricket Stadium, St. George's, Grenada	27 February 2019	Scorecard
Last updated: 22 October 2026

=== Lowest innings totals ===
Score	Team	Opponent	Venue	Date	Scorecard
35 (12.0 overs)	United States	Nepal	Tribhuvan University International Cricket Ground, Kirtipur, Nepal	12 February 2020	Scorecard
35 (18.0 overs)	Zimbabwe	Sri Lanka	Harare Sports Club, Harare, Zimbabwe	25 April 2004	Scorecard
36 (18.4 overs)	Canada	Sri Lanka	Boland Park, Paarl, South Africa	19 Feb 2003	Scorecard
38 (15.5 overs)	Zimbabwe	Sri Lanka	Singhalese Sports Club, Colombo, Sri Lanka	8 Dec 2001	Scorecard
43 (19.5 overs)	Pakistan	West Indies	Newlands Cricket Ground, Cape Town, South Africa	25 Feb 1993	Scorecard
Last updated: 12 February 2020

=== Shortest completed innings (by balls) ===
Score	Balls	Team	Opponent	Venue	Date	Scorecard
35	72	United States	Nepal	Tribhuvan University International Cricket Ground, Kirtipur, Nepal	12 February 2020	Scorecard
54	83	Zimbabwe	Afghanistan	Harare Sports Club, Harare, Zimbabwe	26 February 2017	Scorecard
45	84	Namibia	Australia	North West Cricket Stadium, Potchefstroom, South Africa	27 February 2003	Scorecard
92	89	Canada	Kenya	Jaffery Sports Club Ground, Nairobi, Kenya	5 February 2007	Scorecard
50	92	Sri Lanka	India	R.Premadasa Stadium, Colombo, Sri Lanka	17 September 2023	Scorecard
Last updated: 17 September 2023

=== Most sixes in an innings ===
Sixes	Team	Opponent	Venue	Match date	Scorecard
26	England	Netherlands	VRA Cricket Ground, Amstelveen, Netherlands	17 June 2022	Scorecard
25	England	Afghanistan	Old Trafford Cricket Ground, Manchester, England	18 June 2019	Scorecard
24	England	West Indies	National Cricket Stadium, St. George's, Grenada	27 February 2019	Scorecard
23	West Indies	England	Kensington Oval, Bridgetown, Barbados	20 February 2019	Scorecard
22	New Zealand	West Indies	Queenstown Events Centre, Queenstown, New Zealand	1 January 2014	Scorecard
22	West Indies	England	National Cricket Stadium, St. George's, Grenada	27 February 2019	Scorecard
Last updated: 8 January 2021

=== Most fours in an innings ===
Fours	Team	Opponent	Venue	Match date	Scorecard
56	Sri Lanka	Netherlands	VRA Cricket Ground, Amstelveen, Netherlands	4 July 2006	Scorecard
48	India	West Indies	Holkar Cricket Stadium, Indore, India	8 December 2011	Scorecard
48	Australia	South Africa	Mangaung Oval, Bloemfontein, South Africa	9 September 2023	Scorecard
47	India	Sri Lanka	Eden Gardens, Kolkata, India	13 November 2014	Scorecard
46	New Zealand	Pakistan	M. Chinnaswamy Stadium, Bengaluru, India	4 November 2023	Scorecard
Last updated: 4 November 2023

=== Most individual hundreds in an innings ===
Hundreds	Team	Opponent	Venue	Match date	Scorecard
3	South Africa	West Indies	New Wanderers, Johannesburg, South Africa	21 January 2015	Scorecard
3	South Africa	India	Wankhede Stadium, Mumbai, India	4 July 2015	Scorecard
3	England	Netherlands	VRA Ground, Amstelveen, Netherlands	22 June 2022	Scorecard
3	South Africa	Sri Lanka	Arun Jaitley Stadium, New Delhi, India	7 October 2023	Scorecard
3	Australia	South Africa	Great Barrier Reef Arena, Mackay, Australia	24 August 2025	Scorecard
3	West Indies	India	Assam Cricket Association Stadium, Guwahati	30 September 2026	Scorecard
Last updated: 30 September 2026

=== Most individual hundreds in a match ===
Hundreds	Teams	Venue	Match date	Scorecard
5	West Indies (3 hundreds) and India (2)	Assam Cricket Association Stadium, Guwahati, India	30 September 2026	Scorecard
4	Pakistan (2) and Australia (2)	Gaddafi Stadium, Lahore, Pakistan	10 November 1998	Scorecard
4	India (2) and Australia (2)	Vidarbha Cricket Association Stadium, Nagpur, India	30 October 2013	Scorecard
4	Pakistan (2) and Sri Lanka (2)	Rajiv Gandhi International Stadium, Hyderabad, India	10 October 2023	Scorecard
Last updated: 30 September 2026

== Individual records (batting) ==
=== Most career runs ===
Rank	Runs	Inn.	Player	Team	Average	100	50	Period
1	18,426	452	Sachin Tendulkar	India	44.83	49	96	1989–2012
2	15,195	309	Virat Kohli	India	58.21	55	80	2008–Present
3	14,234	380	Kumar Sangakkara	Sri Lanka	41.98	25	93	2000–2015
4	13,704	365	Ricky Ponting	Australia	42.03	30	82	1995–2012
5	13,430	433	Sanath Jayasuriya	Sri Lanka	32.36	28	68	1989–2011
Last updated: 15 November 2026

=== Most career runs – progression of record ===
Runs	Player	Team	Record held until	Duration of record
82	John Edrich	England	24 August 1972	1 year, 232 days
113	Greg Chappell	Australia	26 August 1972	2 days
144	Ian Chappell	Australia	28 August 1972	2 days
302	Dennis Amiss	England	31 March 1974	1 year, 215 days
316	Ian Chappell	Australia	13 July 1974	104 days
322	Dennis Amiss	England	15 July 1974	2 days
400	Keith Fletcher	England	5 June 1975	325 days
509	Dennis Amiss	England	11 June 1975	6 days
599	Keith Fletcher	England	14 June 1975	3 days
859	Dennis Amiss^{[a]}	England	21 December 1979	4 years, 190 days
867	Greg Chappell	Australia	23 December 1979	2 days
883	Viv Richards	West Indies	26 December 1979	3 days
953	Greg Chappell	Australia	16 January 1980	21 days
1,059	Viv Richards	West Indies	28 May 1980	133 days
1,133	Gordon Greenidge	West Indies	25 November 1980	181 days
1,154	Greg Chappell	Australia	5 December 1980	11 days
1,211	Viv Richards	West Indies	7 December 1980	2 days
2,331	Greg Chappell (Note: This figure is the player's final career total.)	Australia	7 December 1983	3 years
6,501	Viv Richards	West Indies	9 November 1990	6 years, 337 days
8,648	Desmond Haynes	West Indies	8 November 1996	5 years, 365 days
9,378	Mohammad Azharuddin	India	15 October 2000	3 years, 342 days
18,426	Sachin Tendulkar	India	Current	26 years, 38 days
Last updated: 21 January 2016

=== Most runs in each batting position ===
Batting position	Batsman	Team	Innings	Runs	Average	ODI Career Span	Ref
Opener	Sachin Tendulkar	India	340	15,310	48.29	1989–2012	
Number 3	Virat Kohli	India	254	13,074	60.80	2009–present	
Number 4	Ross Taylor	New Zealand	182	7,690	51.27	2006–2022	
Number 5	Arjuna Ranatunga	Sri Lanka	153	4,675	38.63	1984–1999	
Number 6	MS Dhoni	India	129	4,164	47.31	2004–2019	
Number 7	Chris Harris	New Zealand	104	2,130	31.32	1990–2004	
Number 8	Wasim Akram	Pakistan	93	1,208	17.01	1985–2003	
Number 9	Mashrafe Mortaza	Bangladesh/Asia XI	72	701	11.88	2001–2020	
Number 10	Waqar Younis	Pakistan	63	478	11.11	1989–2003	
Number 11	Trent Boult	New Zealand	43	176	9.26	2012–2023	
Last updated: 15 November 2026
Qualification: Batted at least 20 Innings at the given position.

=== Fastest to multiples of 1000 runs ===
Runs	Batsman	Team	Match	Innings	Record Date	Reference
1,000	Fakhar Zaman	Pakistan	18	18	22 July 2018	
2,000	Shubman Gill	India	38	38	22 October 2023	
3,000	Hashim Amla	South Africa	59	57	28 August 2012	
4,000	Hashim Amla	South Africa	84	81	8 December 2013	
5,000	Babar Azam	Pakistan	99	97	5 May 2023	
6,000	Hashim Amla	South Africa	126	123	25 October 2015	
6,000	Babar Azam	Pakistan	126	123	14 February 2025	
7,000	Hashim Amla	South Africa	153	150	29 May 2017	
8,000	Virat Kohli	India	183	175	15 June 2017	
9,000	Virat Kohli	India	202	194	29 October 2017	
10,000	Virat Kohli	India	213	205	24 October 2018	
11,000	Virat Kohli	India	230	222	16 June 2019	
12,000	Virat Kohli	India	251	242	2 December 2020	
13,000	Virat Kohli	India	278	267	11 September 2023	
14,000	Virat Kohli	India	299	287	23 February 2025	
15,000	Virat Kohli	India	315	303	27 September 2026	
16,000	Sachin Tendulkar	India	409	399	5 February 2008	
17,000	Sachin Tendulkar	India	435	424	5 November 2009	
18,000	Sachin Tendulkar	India	451	440	24 March 2011	
Last updated: 27 September 2026

=== Highest individual scores ===
Rank	Score	Player	Team	Opposition	Venue	Date	Scorecard
1	264	Rohit Sharma	India	Sri Lanka	Eden Gardens, Kolkata, India	13 November 2014	Scorecard
2	237*	Martin Guptill	New Zealand	West Indies	Westpac Stadium, Wellington, New Zealand	21 March 2015	Scorecard
3	223*	Shubman Gill	India	West Indies	ACA Stadium, Guwahati, India	30 September 2026	Scorecard
4	219	Virender Sehwag	India	West Indies	Holkar Cricket Stadium, Indore, India	8 December 2011	Scorecard
5	215	Chris Gayle	West Indies	Zimbabwe	Manuka Oval, Canberra, Australia	24 February 2015	Scorecard
Last updated: 30 September 2026

=== Highest individual score (progression of record) ===
Runs	Date	Player	Team	Opponent	Match Scorecard	Notes
82	5 January 1971	John Edrich	England	Australia	Scorecard	First ever ODI fifty; England lost the match
103	24 August 1972	Dennis Amiss	England	Australia	Scorecard	First ever ODI Century; Achieved while chasing target
105	7 September 1973	Roy Fredericks	West Indies	England	Scorecard	Achieved while chasing target
116*	31 August 1974	David Lloyd	England	Pakistan	Scorecard	England lost the match
137	7 June 1975	Dennis Amiss	England	India	Scorecard	World Cup; Only player to reclaim the record
171*	7 June 1975	Glenn Turner	New Zealand	East Africa	Scorecard	World Cup; First ever ODI 150; Faced most balls in an ODI innings (201)
175*	18 June 1983	Kapil Dev	India	Zimbabwe	Scorecard	World Cup; Was the fastest ODI century
189*	31 May 1984	Viv Richards	West Indies	England	Scorecard	
194	21 May 1997	Saeed Anwar	Pakistan	India	Scorecard	
194*	16 August 2009	Charles Coventry	Zimbabwe	Bangladesh	Scorecard	Equalled the record but was not out.; Zimbabwe lost the match
200*	24 February 2010	Sachin Tendulkar	India	South Africa	Scorecard	First man to achieve an ODI double century
219	8 December 2011	Virendar Sehwag	India	West Indies	Scorecard	
264	13 November 2014	Rohit Sharma	India	Sri Lanka	Scorecard	First ever ODI 250; First man to achieve two double hundreds in ODIs
Last updated: 31 August 2016

=== Highest individual score at each position ===
Batting position	Score	Player	Team	Opponent	Venue	Date
Opener	264	Rohit Sharma	India	Sri Lanka	Eden Gardens, Kolkata, India	13 November 2014
Number 3	194*	Charles Coventry	Zimbabwe	Bangladesh	Queens Sports Club, Bulawayo, Zimbabwe	16 August 2009
Number 4	202	Harry Brook	England	Sri Lanka	Rawalpindi Cricket Stadium, Rawalpindi, Pakistan	22 October 2026
Number 5	174	Heinrich Klaasen	South Africa	Australia	SuperSport Park, Centurion, South Africa	15 September 2023
Number 6	201*	Glenn Maxwell	Australia	Afghanistan	Wankhede Stadium, Mumbai, India	7 November 2023
Number 7	170*	Luke Ronchi	New Zealand	Sri Lanka	University Oval, Dunedin, New Zealand	23 January 2015
Number 8	113*	Shadab Khan	Pakistan	England	Gaddafi Stadium, Lahore, Pakistan	25 October 2026
Number 9	92*	Andre Russell	West Indies	India	Sir Vivian Richards Stadium, Saint George, Antigua and Barbuda	11 June 2011
Number 10	86*	Ravi Rampaul	West Indies	India	ACA–VDCA Cricket Stadium, Visakhapatnam, India	2 December 2011
Number 11	58	Mohammad Amir	Pakistan	England	Trent Bridge, Nottingham, England	30 August 2016
Last updated: 25 October 2026

=== Highest career average ===
Rank	Average	Player	Team	Innings	Runs	Not Outs	Period
1	67.00	Ryan ten Doeschate	Netherlands	32	1,541	9	2006–2011
2	62.72	Milind Kumar	United States	31	1,380	9	2024–Present
3	62.50	Shubman Gill	India	71	3,750	11	2019–Present
4	58.21	Virat Kohli	India	309	15,195	48	2008–Present
5	56.74	Daryl Mitchell	New Zealand	59	2,834	8	2021–Present
Last updated: 15 November 2026
Qualification: At least 20 innings.

=== Highest average at each position ===
Batting position	Player	Team	Innings	Runs	Average	Career Span	Ref
Opener	Shai Hope	West Indies	50	2,774	64.51	2017–2026	
Number 3	Virat Kohli	India	254	13,074	60.80	2009–2026	
Number 4	Michael Bevan	Australia	53	2,265	59.60	1994–2004	
Number 5	AB de Villiers	South Africa	42	2,027	77.96	2006–2017	
Number 6	Michael Bevan	Australia	87	3,006	56.71	1994–2004	
Number 7	Michael Hussey	Australia	21	725	120.83	2004–2012	
Number 8	Lance Klusener	South Africa	36	1,056	58.66	1996–2004	
Number 9	Liam Plunkett	England	31	459	25.50	2005–2019	
Number 10	Dawlat Zadran	Afghanistan	25	252	28.00	2012–2019	
Number 11	Boyd Rankin	England/Ireland	23	85	14.16	2007–2020	
Last updated: 15 November 2026
Qualification: Batted at least 20 innings at the given position.

=== Highest strike rates ===
Rank	Strike rate	Player	Team	Runs	Balls faced	Period
1	130.22	Andre Russell	West Indies	1,034	794	2011–2019
2	126.70	Glenn Maxwell	Australia	3,990	3,149	2012–2025
3	117.06	Lionel Cann	Bermuda	590	504	2006–2009
4	117.05	Heinrich Klaasen	South Africa	2,141	1,829	2018–2025
5	117.00	Shahid Afridi	Pakistan	8,064	6,892	1996–2015
Last updated: 4 March 2025
Qualification: Faced at least 500 balls.

=== Most centuries ===
Rank	Centuries	Innings	Player	Team	Period
1	55	303	Virat Kohli	India	2008–present
2	49	452	Sachin Tendulkar	India	1989–2012
3	34	281	Rohit Sharma	India	2007–present
4	30	365	Ricky Ponting	Australia	1995–2012
5	28	433	Sanath Jayasuriya	Sri Lanka	1989–2011
Last updated: 27 September 2026

=== Most fifties ===
Rank	Fifties	Innings	Player	Team	Period
1	96	452	Sachin Tendulkar	India	1989–2012
2	93	380	Kumar Sangakkara	Sri Lanka	2000–2015
3	86	314	Jacques Kallis	South Africa	1996–2014
4	83	318	Rahul Dravid	India	1996–2011
4	83	350	Inzamam-ul-Haq	Pakistan	1991–2007
Last updated: 15 February 2016

=== Fastest fifties ===
Rank	Balls faced	Player	Team	Opposition	Venue	Date	Scorecard
1	16	AB de Villiers	South Africa	West Indies	Wanderers Stadium, Johannesburg, South Africa	18 January 2015	Scorecard
1	16	Matthew Forde	West Indies	Ireland	Dublin, Ireland	23 May 2025	Scorecard
3	17	Sanath Jayasuriya	Sri Lanka	Pakistan	Singapore Cricket Club Ground, Padang, Singapore	7 April 1996	Scorecard
3	17	Kusal Perera	Sri Lanka	Pakistan	Pallekele International Cricket Stadium, Pallekele, Sri Lanka	15 July 2015	Scorecard
3	17	Martin Guptill	New Zealand	Sri Lanka	Hagley Park, Christchurch, New Zealand	28 December 2015	Scorecard
3	17	Liam Livingstone	England	Netherlands	VRA Cricket Ground, Amstelveen, Netherlands	17 June 2022	Scorecard
Last updated: 23 May 2025

=== Fastest centuries ===
Rank	Balls faced	Player	Team	Opposition	Venue	Date	Scorecard
1	31	AB de Villiers	South Africa	West Indies	Wanderers Stadium, Johannesburg, South Africa	18 January 2015	Scorecard
2	36	Corey Anderson	New Zealand	West Indies	Queenstown Events Centre, Queenstown, New Zealand	1 January 2014	Scorecard
3	37	Shahid Afridi	Pakistan	Sri Lanka	Nairobi Gymkhana Club, Nairobi, Kenya	4 October 1996	Scorecard
4	40	Glenn Maxwell	Australia	Netherlands	Arun Jaitley Stadium, Delhi, India	25 October 2023	Scorecard
5	41	Asif Khan	United Arab Emirates	Nepal	Tribhuvan University International Cricket Ground, Kirtipur, Nepal	16 March 2023	Scorecard
Last updated: 25 October 2023

=== Fastest double centuries ===
Rank	Balls faced	Player	Team	Opposition	Venue	Date	Scorecard
1	114	Harry Brook	England	Sri Lanka	Rawalpindi Cricket Stadium, Rawalpindi, Pakistan	22 October 2026	Scorecard
2	117	Shubman Gill	India	West Indies	Assam Cricket Association Stadium, Guwahati, India	30 September 2026	Scorecard
3	126	Ishan Kishan	India	Bangladesh	Zohur Ahmed Chowdhury Stadium, Chattogram, Bangladesh	10 December 2022	Scorecard
4	128	Glenn Maxwell	Australia	Afghanistan	Wankhede Stadium, Mumbai, India	7 November 2023	Scorecard
5	136	Pathum Nissanka	Sri Lanka	Afghanistan	Pallekele International Cricket Stadium, Pallekele, Sri Lanka	9 February 2024	Scorecard
Last updated: 22 October 2026

=== Most sixes in career ===
Rank	Sixes	Player	Team	Innings	Span
1	383	Rohit Sharma	India	287	2007–present
2	351	Shahid Afridi	Pakistan	369	1996–2015
3	331	Chris Gayle	West Indies	294	1999–2019
4	270	Sanath Jayasuriya	Sri Lanka	433	1989–2011
5	229	MS Dhoni	India	297	2004–2019
Last updated: 15 November 2026

=== Most fours in career ===
Rank	Fours	Player	Team	Innings	Span
1	2,016	Sachin Tendulkar	India	452	1989–2012
2	1,500	Sanath Jayasuriya	Sri Lanka	433	1989–2011
3	1,416	Virat Kohli	India	309	2008–present
4	1,385	Kumar Sangakkara	Sri Lanka	380	2000–2015
5	1,231	Ricky Ponting	Australia	365	1995–2012
Last updated: 15 November 2026

=== Most sixes in an innings ===
Rank	Sixes	Runs	Player	Team	Opposition	Venue	Match date	Scorecard
1	17	148	Eoin Morgan	England	Afghanistan	Old Trafford Cricket Ground, Manchester, England	18 June 2019	Scorecard
2	16	209	Rohit Sharma	India	Australia	M. Chinnaswamy Stadium, Bengaluru, India	2 November 2013	Scorecard
2	16	149	AB de Villiers	South Africa	West Indies	Wanderers Stadium, Johannesburg, South Africa	18 January 2015	Scorecard
2	16	215	Chris Gayle	West Indies	Zimbabwe	Manuka Oval, Canberra, Australia	24 February 2015	Scorecard
2	16	173*	Jaskaran Malhotra	United States	Papua New Guinea	Oman Cricket Academy Ground, Muscat, Oman	9 September 2021	Scorecard
Last updated: 9 September 2021

=== Most fours in an innings ===
Rank	Fours	Runs	Player	Team	Opposition	Venue	Match date	Scorecard
1	33	264	Rohit Sharma	India	Sri Lanka	Eden Gardens, Kolkata, India	13 November 2014	Scorecard
2	26	223*	Shubman Gill	India	West Indies	Assam Cricket Association Stadium, Guwahati, India	30 September 2026	Scorecard
3	25	200*	Sachin Tendulkar	India	South Africa	Captain Roop Singh Stadium, Gwalior, India	24 February 2010	Scorecard
3	25	219	Virender Sehwag	India	West Indies	Holkar Cricket Stadium, Indore, India	8 December 2011	Scorecard
5	24	157	Sanath Jayasuriya	Sri Lanka	Netherlands	VRA Cricket Ground, Amstelveen, Netherlands	4 July 2006	Scorecard
5	24	237*	Martin Guptill	New Zealand	West Indies	Wellington Regional Stadium, Wellington, New Zealand	21 March 2015	Scorecard
5	24	173	David Warner	Australia	South Africa	Newlands Cricket Ground, Cape Town, South Africa	12 October 2016	Scorecard
5	24	210*	Fakhar Zaman	Pakistan	Zimbabwe	Queens Sports Club, Bulawayo, Zimbabwe	20 July 2018	Scorecard
5	24	210	Ishan Kishan	India	Bangladesh	Zohur Ahmed Chowdhury Stadium, Chittagong, Bangladesh	10 December 2022	Scorecard
Last updated: 30 September 2026

=== Highest strike rates in an innings ===
Rank	Strike rate	Player	Runs	Balls Faced	Team	Opposition	Venue	Date
1	387.50	James Franklin	31*	8	New Zealand	Canada	Wankhede Stadium, Mumbai	13 March 2011
2	361.53	James Neesham	47*	13	New Zealand	Sri Lanka	Bay Oval, Tauranga	3 January 2019
3	355.55	Nathan McCullum	32*	9	New Zealand	Sri Lanka	Mahinda Rajapaksa International Stadium, Hambantota	12 November 2011
3	355.55	Glenn Maxwell	32*	9	Australia	Zimbabwe	Riverway Stadium, Townsville	28 August 2022
5	344.44	Moeen Ali	31*	9	England	Afghanistan	Old Trafford Cricket Ground, Manchester	18 June 2019
Last updated: 1 April 2023

=== Most runs in a calendar year ===
Rank	Runs	Innings	Player	Team	Year
1	1,894	33	Sachin Tendulkar	India	1998
2	1,767	41	Sourav Ganguly	India	1999
3	1,761	43	Rahul Dravid	India	1999
4	1,611	32	Sachin Tendulkar	India	1996
5	1,601	30	Matthew Hayden	Australia	2007
Last updated: 15 February 2016

=== Most runs in a series ===
Rank	Runs	Innings	Player	Team	Series
1	765	11	Virat Kohli	India	2023 Cricket World Cup
2	686	14	Greg Chappell	Australia	Benson & Hedges World Series Cup 1980-81
3	673	11	Sachin Tendulkar	India	2003 Cricket World Cup
4	659	10	Matthew Hayden	Australia	2007 Cricket World Cup
5	651	11	Viv Richards	West Indies	Benson & Hedges World Series Cup 1984-85
Last updated: 16 November 2023

=== Most runs in an over ===
Rank	Runs	Sequence	Batsman	Team	Bowler	Opposition Team	Venue	Date	Scorecard
1	36	6–6–6–6–6–6	Herschelle Gibbs	South Africa	Daan van Bunge	Netherlands	Warner Park Sporting Complex, Basseterre	16 March 2007	Scorecard
1	36	6–6–6–6–6–6	Jaskaran Malhotra	United States	Gaudi Toka	Papua New Guinea	Oman Cricket Academy Ground, Muscat	9 September 2021	Scorecard
3	35	6–W–6–6–6–4–6	Thisara Perera	Sri Lanka	Robin Peterson	South Africa	Pallekele International Cricket Stadium, Pallekele	26 July 2013	Scorecard
4	34	4–(N+6)–2–(N+4)–4–4–2–6	AB de Villiers	South Africa	Jason Holder	West Indies	Sydney Cricket Ground, Sydney	27 February 2015	Scorecard
4	34	6–6–6–6–(N+2)–6–1	James Neesham	New Zealand	Thisara Perera	Sri Lanka	Bay Oval, Mount Maunganui	3 January 2019	Scorecard
Last updated: 9 September 2021
Key: *N – No ball *W – Wide

=== Most ducks in career ===
Rank	Ducks	Player	Team	Matches	Innings	Period
1	34	Sanath Jayasuriya	Sri Lanka	445	433	1989–2011
2	30	Shahid Afridi	Pakistan	398	369	1996–2015
3	28	Wasim Akram	Pakistan	356	280	1984–2003
3	28	Mahela Jayawardene	Sri Lanka	448	418	1998–2015
5	26	Lasith Malinga	Sri Lanka	226	119	2004–2019
Last updated: 4 August 2020

=== Most innings before first duck ===
Rank	Innings	Player	Team	Span
1	105*	Kepler Wessels (Note: Wessels went through his ODI career without being dismissed for a duck)	Australia/South Africa	1983–1994
2	72	Kumar Dharmasena	Sri Lanka	1994–2001
3	70	Gordon Greenidge	West Indies	1975–1986
3	70	Samiullah Shinwari	Afghanistan	2009–2019
5	68	Craig McMillan	New Zealand	1997–2001
Last updated: 24 July 2019

=== Most runs in a career without scoring a century ===
Rank	Runs	Player	Team	Best	Span
1	5,122	Misbah-ul-Haq	Pakistan	96*	2002–2015
2	3,717	Wasim Akram	Pakistan	86	1984–2003
3	3,266	Moin Khan	Pakistan	72*	1990–2004
4	2,943	Heath Streak	Zimbabwe	79*	1993–2005
5	2,905	Ravindra Jadeja	India	87	2009–2026
Last updated: 18 January 2026

== Individual records (bowling) ==
=== Most wickets ===
Rank	Wickets	Matches	Player	Team	Avg	SR	4 W	5 W	Period
1	534	350	Muttiah Muralitharan	Sri Lanka	23.08	35.2	15	10	1993–2011
2	502	356	Wasim Akram	Pakistan	23.52	36.2	17	6	1984–2003
3	416	262	Waqar Younis	Pakistan	23.84	30.5	14	13	1989–2003
4	400	322	Chaminda Vaas	Sri Lanka	27.53	39.4	9	4	1994–2008
5	395	398	Shahid Afridi	Pakistan	34.51	44.7	4	9	1996–2015
Last updated: 15 February 2016

=== Fastest to multiples of wickets ===
Wickets	Bowler	Team	Match	Record Date	Ref.
50	Ajantha Mendis	Sri Lanka	19	12 January 2009	
100	Sandeep Lamichhane	Nepal	42	21 April 2023	
150	Sandeep Lamichhane	Nepal	73	18 May 2026	
200	Mitchell Starc	Australia	102	3 September 2022	
250	Saqlain Mushtaq	Pakistan	138	20 April 2001	
300	Brett Lee	Australia	171	29 June 2008	
350	Brett Lee	Australia	202	10 August 2011	
400	Waqar Younis	Pakistan	252	8 December 2002	
450	Muttiah Muralitharan	Sri Lanka	295	18 April 2007	
500	Muttiah Muralitharan	Sri Lanka	324	24 January 2009	
Last updated: 18 May 2026

=== Best innings figures ===
Rank	Figures	Player	Team	Opposition	Venue	Date
1	8/19	Chaminda Vaas	Sri Lanka	Zimbabwe	R. Premadasa Stadium, Colombo	8 December 2001
2	7/12	Shahid Afridi	Pakistan	West Indies	Bourda, Georgetown	14 July 2013
3	7/15	Glenn McGrath	Australia	Namibia	JB Marks Oval, Potchefstroom	27 February 2003
4	7/18	Rashid Khan	Afghanistan	West Indies	Darren Sammy Cricket Ground, Gros Islet	9 June 2017
5	7/19	Wanindu Hasaranga	Sri Lanka	Zimbabwe	R. Premadasa Stadium, Colombo	11 January 2024
Last updated: 11 January 2024

=== Best innings figures – progression of record ===
Figures	Player	Team	Opposition	Venue	Date
3/34	Ashley Mallett	Australia	England	Melbourne Cricket Ground, Melbourne	1971
3/33	Bob Woolmer	England	Australia	Old Trafford Cricket Ground, Manchester	1972
4/27	Geoff Arnold	England	Australia	Edgbaston Cricket Ground, Birmingham	1972
5/34	Dennis Lillee	Australia	Pakistan	Headingley Cricket Ground, Leeds	1975
6/14	Gary Gilmour	Australia	England	Headingley Cricket Ground, Leeds	1975
7/51	Winston Davis	West Indies	Australia	Headingley Cricket Ground, Leeds	1983
7/37	Aaqib Javed	Pakistan	India	Sharjah Cricket Stadium, Sharjah	1991–92
7/30	Muttiah Muralitharan	Sri Lanka	India	Sharjah Cricket Stadium, Sharjah	2000–01
8/19	Chaminda Vaas	Sri Lanka	Zimbabwe	Sinhalese Sports Club Ground, Colombo	2001–02

=== Best career bowling average ===
Rank	Bowling average	Player	Team	Runs	Wickets	Span
1	16.41	Shakeel Ahmed	Oman	1,018	62	2024–2026
2	18.84	Joel Garner	West Indies	2,752	146	1977–1987
3	18.90	Rashid Khan	Afghanistan	4,481	237	2015–2026
4	18.90	Ryan Harris	Australia	832	44	2009–2012
5	18.97	Tony Gray	West Indies	835	44	1985–1991
Last updated: 4 November 2026
Qualification: At least 1,000 balls bowled.

=== Best career economy rate ===
Rank	Economy rate	Player	Team	Balls	Runs	Span
1	3.09	Joel Garner	West Indies	5,330	2,752	1977–1987
2	3.25	Max Walker	Australia	1,006	546	1977–1981
3	3.27	Mike Hendrick	England	1,248	681	1973–1981
4	3.28	Bob Willis	England	3,595	1,968	1973–1984
5	3.30	Richard Hadlee	New Zealand	6,182	3,407	1973–1990
Last updated: 6 March 2023
Qualification: At least 1,000 balls bowled.

=== Best career bowling strike rate ===
Rank	Strike rate	Player	Team	Balls	Wickets	Span
1	23.43	Ryan Harris	Australia	1,031	44	2009–2012
2	23.85	Jacob Duffy	New Zealand	1,169	49	2022–2026
3	24.75	Corey Anderson	New Zealand	1,485	60	2013–2017
4	24.85	Bilal Khan	Oman	2,510	101	2019–2024
5	25.02	Kyle Klein	Netherlands	1,176	47	2024–2026
Last updated: 15 November 2026
Qualification: At least 1,000 balls bowled.

=== Most 5 wickets in an innings ===
Rank	5 Wkts	Player	Team	Matches	Span
1	13	Waqar Younis	Pakistan	262	1989–2003
2	10	Muttiah Muralitharan	Sri Lanka	350	1993–2011
3	9	Mitchell Starc	Australia	127	2010–2024
3	9	Brett Lee	Australia	221	2000–2012
3	9	Shahid Afridi	Pakistan	398	1996–2015
Last updated: 20 March 2023

=== Most consecutive five wickets in an innings ===
Rank	5 Wkts	Player	Team	Matches	Span
1	3	Waqar Younis	Pakistan	262	1989–2003
1	3	Wanindu Hasaranga	Sri Lanka	55	2017–2024
3	2	12 players			
Last updated: 4 August 2024

=== Best economy rates in an innings ===
Rank	Economy	Player	Team	Overs	Runs	Wickets	Opposition	Venue	Date
1	0.20	Sean Abbott	Australia	5	1	2	New Zealand	Cazalys Stadium, Cairns	8 September 2022
2	0.30	Phil Simmons	West Indies	10	3	4	Pakistan	Sydney Cricket Ground, Sydney	17 December 1992
3	0.40	Dermot Reeve	England	5	2	1	Pakistan	Adelaide Oval, Adelaide	1 March 1992
4	0.50	Bishan Bedi	India	12	6	1	East Africa	Headingley Cricket Ground, Leeds	11 June 1975
4	0.50	Curtly Ambrose	West Indies	10	5	1	Sri Lanka	Sharjah Cricket Stadium, Sharjah	13 October 1999
Last updated: 25 March 2023
Qualification: At least 30 balls bowled.

=== Best strike rates in an innings ===
Rank	Strike rate	Player	Team	Wickets	Runs	Balls	Opposition	Venue	Date
1	3.60	Ryan Burl	Zimbabwe	5	10	18	Australia	Riverway Stadium, Queensland	3 September 2022
2	4.25	Sunil Dhaniram	Canada	4	10	17	Bermuda	Gymkhana Club Ground, Nairobi	2 February 2007
2	4.25	Paul Collingwood	England	4	15	17	New Zealand	Riverside Ground, Chester-le-Street	15 June 2008
2	4.25	Virender Sehwag	India	4	6	17	Bangladesh	Rangiri Dambulla International Stadium, Dambulla	16 June 2010
5	4.50	Tillakaratne Dilshan	Sri Lanka	4	4	18	Zimbabwe	Pallekele International Cricket Stadium, Pallekele	10 March 2011
5	4.50	Sushan Bhari	Nepal	4	5	18	United States	TU Cricket Ground, Kirtipur	12 February 2020
5	4.50	Kuldeep Yadav	India	4	6	18	West Indies	Kensington Oval, Bridgetown	27 July 2023
5	4.50	Adam Zampa	Australia	4	8	18	Netherlands	Arun Jaitley Cricket Stadium, New Delhi	25 October 2023
Last updated: 25 October 2023
Qualification: At least 4 wickets.

=== Most runs conceded in an innings ===
Rank	Runs	Bowling figures	Player	Team	Opposition	Venue	Date
1	115	10–0–115–2	Bas de Leede	Netherlands	Australia	Arun Jaitley Cricket Stadium, Delhi	25 October 2023
2	113	10–0–113–0	Mick Lewis	Australia	South Africa	Wanderers Stadium, Johannesburg	12 March 2006
2	113	10–0–113–0	Adam Zampa	Australia	South Africa	Centurion Park, Centurion	15 September 2023
4	110	10–0–110–0	Wahab Riaz	Pakistan	England	Trent Bridge, Nottingham	30 August 2016
4	110	9–0–110–0	Rashid Khan	Afghanistan	England	Old Trafford Cricket Ground, Manchester	18 June 2019
Last updated: 25 October 2023

=== Most wickets in a calendar year ===
Rank	Wickets	Player	Team	Matches	Year
1	69	Saqlain Mushtaq	Pakistan	36	1997
2	65	Saqlain Mushtaq	Pakistan	33	1996
3	62	Saeed Ajmal	Pakistan	33	2013
3	62	Shane Warne	Australia	37	1999
5	61	Anil Kumble	India	32	1996
5	61	Shaun Pollock	South Africa	38	2000
5	61	Abdul Razzaq	Pakistan	38	2000
Last updated: 27 August 2020

=== Most wickets in a series ===
Rank	Wickets	Player	Team	Matches	Series
1	27	Glenn McGrath	Australia	11	1998–99 Carlton and United Series
1	27	Mitchell Starc	Australia	10	2019 Cricket World Cup
3	26	Glenn McGrath	Australia	11	2007 Cricket World Cup
4	25	Dennis Lillee	Australia	14	Benson & Hedges World Series Cup 1980–81
5	24	Mohammed Shami	India	7	2023 Cricket World Cup
5	24	Joel Garner	West Indies	14	Benson & Hedges World Series Cup 1981–82
Last updated: 1 January 2024

== Individual records (fielding) ==
=== Most catches in ODI career ===
Rank	Catches (Note: This list excludes catches made as wicket-keeper.)	Innings	Player	Team	Ct/Inn	Span
1	218	443	Mahela Jayawardene	Sri Lanka	0.492	1998–2015
2	173	318	Virat Kohli	India	0.544	2008–2026
3	160	372	Ricky Ponting	Australia	0.430	1995–2012
4	156	332	Mohammed Azharuddin	India	0.469	1985–2000
5	142	232	Ross Taylor	New Zealand	0.612	2006–2022
Last updated: 15 November 2026

=== Most catches in a series ===
Rank	Catches	Player	Team	Matches	Innings	Series
1	13	Joe Root	England	11	11	2019 Cricket World Cup
2	12	Allan Border	Australia	11	11	Benson & Hedges World Series 1988–89
2	12	VVS Laxman	India	7	7	2003–04 VB Series
4	11	Carl Hooper	West Indies	7	7	1992–93 Total International Series
4	11	Daryl Mitchell	New Zealand	10	10	2023 Cricket World Cup
4	11	Jeremy Coney	New Zealand	11	11	Benson & Hedges World Series 1980–81
4	11	Ricky Ponting	Australia	11	11	2003 Cricket World Cup
4	11	Allan Border	Australia	12	12	Benson & Hedges World Series 1985–86
Last updated: 1 January 2024

== Individual records (wicket-keeping) ==
=== Most dismissals ===
Rank	Dismissals	Innings	Player	Team	Catches	Stumpings	Dis/Inn	Span
1	482 (Note: Sangakkara also took 19 catches in 44 matches where he was not the designated wicket-keeper.)	353	Kumar Sangakkara	Sri Lanka	383	99	1.365	2000–2015
2	472	281	Adam Gilchrist	Australia	417	55	1.679	1996–2008
3	444	345	MS Dhoni	India	321	123	1.286	2004–2019
4	424	290	Mark Boucher	South Africa	402	22	1.462	1998–2011
5	297	258	Mushfiqur Rahim	Bangladesh	241	56	1.151	2006–2025
Last updated: 5 March 2025

=== Most catches ===
Rank	Catches	Innings	Player	Team	Span
1	417	281	Adam Gilchrist	Australia	1996–2008
2	402	290	Mark Boucher	South Africa	1998–2011
3	383 (Note: Sangakkara also took 19 catches in 44 matches where he was not the designated wicket-keeper.)	353	Kumar Sangakkara	Sri Lanka	2000–2015
4	321	345	MS Dhoni	India	2004–2019
5	241	258	Mushfiqur Rahim	Bangladesh	2006–2025
Last updated: 6 March 2025

=== Most stumpings ===
Rank	Stumpings	Innings	Player	Team	Span
1	123	345	MS Dhoni	India	2004–2019
2	99	353	Kumar Sangakkara	Sri Lanka	2000–2015
3	75	185	Romesh Kaluwitharana	Sri Lanka	1990–2004
4	73	209	Moin Khan	Pakistan	1990–2004
5	56	258	Mushfiqur Rahim†	Bangladesh	2006–2025
Last updated: 18 March 2024

=== Most dismissals in a series ===
Rank	Dismissals	Team	Player	Matches	Innings	Series
1	27	Adam Gilchrist	Australia	12	12	1998–99 Carlton & United Series
2	23	Jeff Dujon	West Indies	13	13	Benson & Hedges World Series 1984–85
3	22	Rodney Marsh	Australia	12	12	Benson & Hedges World Series 1982–83
4	21	Adam Gilchrist	Australia	10	10	2003 Cricket World Cup
4	21	MS Dhoni	India	10	9	2007–08 Commonwealth Bank Series
4	21	Tom Latham	New Zealand	10	10	2019 Cricket World Cup
Last updated: 27 August 2020

== Individual match records ==
=== Most matches played ===
Rank	Matches	Player	Team	Runs	Wkts	Period
1	463	Sachin Tendulkar	India	18,426	154	1989–2012
2	448	Mahela Jayawardene	Sri Lanka	12,650	8	1998–2015
3	445	Sanath Jayasuriya	Sri Lanka	13,430	323	1989–2011
4	404	Kumar Sangakkara	Sri Lanka	14,234	-	2000–2015
5	398	Shahid Afridi	Pakistan	8,064	395	1996–2015
Last updated: 9 January 2016

=== Most consecutive career matches ===
Rank	Matches	Player	Team	Period
1	185	Sachin Tendulkar	India	1990–1998
2	172	Andy Flower	Zimbabwe	1992–2001
3	162	Hansie Cronje	South Africa	1993–2000
4	133	Shaun Pollock	South Africa	2000–2005
5	132	Richie Richardson	West Indies	1987–1993
Last updated: 3 June 2018

=== Most matches played as captain ===
Rank	Matches	Player	Team	Won	Lost	Tied	NR	Won%	Period
1	230	Ricky Ponting	Australia	165	51	2	12	76.14	2002–2012
2	218	Stephen Fleming	New Zealand	98	106	1	13	48.04	1997–2007
3	200	MS Dhoni	India	110	74	5	11	59.52	2007–2018
4	193	Arjuna Ranatunga	Sri Lanka	89	95	1	8	48.37	1988–1999
5	178	Allan Border	Australia	107	67	1	3	61.42	1985–1994
Last updated: 27 August 2020

=== Most matches won as a captain ===
Rank	Won	Player	Team	Matches	Lost	Tied	NR	Won%	Period
1	165	Ricky Ponting	Australia	230	51	2	12	76.14	2002–2012
2	110	MS Dhoni	India	200	74	5	11	59.52	2007–2018
3	107	Allan Border	Australia	178	67	1	3	61.42	1985–1994
4	99	Hansie Cronje	South Africa	138	35	1	3	73.70	1994–2000
5	98	Stephen Fleming	New Zealand	218	106	1	13	48.04	1997–2007
Last updated: 27 August 2020

=== Youngest player on debut ===
Rank	Age	Player	Team	Date
1	14 years, 223 days	Hasan Raza	Pakistan	30 October 1996
2	15 years, 116 days	Mohammad Sharif	Bangladesh	7 April 2001
3	15 years, 212 days	Gulsan Jha	Nepal	17 September 2021
4	15 years, 258 days	Gurdeep Singh	Kenya	4 October 2013
5	15 years, 273 days	Nitish Kumar	Canada	18 February 2010
Last updated: 17 September 2021

=== Oldest player on debut ===
Rank	Age	Player	Team	Date
1	47 years, 240 days	Nolan Clarke	Netherlands	17 February 1996
2	44 years, 359 days	Norman Gifford	England	24 March 1985
3	43 years, 306 days	Rahul Sharma	Hong Kong	16 July 2004
4	43 years, 236 days	Lennie Louw	Namibia	20 February 2003
5	43 years, 112 days	Flavian Aponso	Netherlands	17 February 1996
Last updated: 27 August 2020

=== Oldest player ===
Rank	Age	Player	Team	Date
1	47 years, 257 days	Nolan Clarke	Netherlands	5 March 1996
2	45 years, 312 days	John Traicos	Zimbabwe	25 March 1993
3	44 years, 361 days	Norman Gifford	England	26 March 1985
4	43 years, 308 days	Rahul Sharma	Hong Kong	18 July 2004
5	43 years, 267 days	Khurram Khan	United Arab Emirates	15 March 2015
Last updated: 27 August 2020

=== Most Player-of-the-Match awards ===
Rank	No. of Awards	Player	Team	Matches	Period
1	62	Sachin Tendulkar	India	463	1989–2012
2	48	Sanath Jayasuriya	Sri Lanka	445	1989–2011
3	45	Virat Kohli	India	315	2008–Present
4	32	Jacques Kallis	South Africa	328	1996–2014
4	32	Ricky Ponting	Australia	375	1995–2012
4	32	Shahid Afridi	Pakistan	398	1996–2015
Last updated: 27 September 2026

=== Most Player-of-the-series awards ===
Rank	No. of Awards	Player	Team	Matches	Series	Period
1	15	Sachin Tendulkar	India	463	108	1989–2012
2	12	Virat Kohli	India	315	76	2008–Present
3	11	Sanath Jayasuriya	Sri Lanka	445	111	1989–2011
4	9	Shaun Pollock	South Africa	303	60	1996–2008
5	8	Chris Gayle	West Indies	301	71	1999–2019
Last updated: 27 September 2026

== Partnership records ==
=== Highest partnerships ===
Rank	Runs	Wicket	First batsman	Second batsman	Team	Opposition	Venue	Date	Scorecard
1	372	2nd	Chris Gayle	Marlon Samuels	West Indies	Zimbabwe	Manuka Oval, Canberra	24 February 2015	Scorecard
2	365	1st	John Campbell	Shai Hope	West Indies	Ireland	Castle Avenue, Dublin	5 May 2019	Scorecard
3	331	2nd	Sachin Tendulkar	Rahul Dravid	India	New Zealand	Lal Bahadur Shastri Stadium, Hyderabad	8 November 1999	Scorecard
4	318	2nd	Sourav Ganguly	Rahul Dravid	India	Sri Lanka	County Ground, Taunton	26 May 1999	Scorecard
5	304	1st	Fakhar Zaman	Imam-ul-Haq	Pakistan	Zimbabwe	Queens Sports Club, Bulawayo	20 July 2018	Scorecard
Last updated: 27 August 2020

=== Highest partnerships by wicket ===
Wicket	Runs	First batsman	Second batsman	Team	Opposition	Venue	Date	Scorecard
1st wicket	365	John Campbell	Shai Hope	West Indies	Ireland	Castle Avenue, Dublin	5 May 2019	Scorecard
2nd wicket	372	Chris Gayle	Marlon Samuels	West Indies	Zimbabwe	Manuka Oval, Canberra	24 February 2015	Scorecard
3rd wicket	258	Darren Bravo	Denesh Ramdin	West Indies	Bangladesh	Warner Park Sporting Complex, Basseterre	25 August 2014	Scorecard
4th wicket	275*	Mohammad Azharuddin	Ajay Jadeja	India	Zimbabwe	Barabati Stadium, Cuttack	9 April 1998	Scorecard
5th wicket	256*	David Miller	JP Duminy	South Africa	Zimbabwe	Seddon Park, Hamilton	15 February 2015	Scorecard
6th wicket	267*	Grant Elliott	Luke Ronchi	New Zealand	Sri Lanka	University Oval, Dunedin	23 January 2015	Scorecard
7th wicket	177	Jos Buttler	Adil Rashid	England	New Zealand	Edgbaston Cricket Ground, Birmingham	9 June 2015	Scorecard
8th wicket	202*	Glenn Maxwell	Pat Cummins	Australia	Afghanistan	Wankhede Stadium, Mumbai	7 November 2023	Scorecard
9th wicket	132	Angelo Mathews	Lasith Malinga	Sri Lanka	Australia	Melbourne Cricket Ground, Melbourne	3 November 2010	Scorecard
10th wicket	106*	Viv Richards	Michael Holding	West Indies	England	Old Trafford Cricket Ground, Manchester	31 May 1984	Scorecard
Last updated: 7 November 2023
An asterisk (*) signifies an unbroken partnership (i.e. neither of the batsmen was dismissed before either the end of the allotted overs or the required score being reached).

=== Highest overall partnership runs by a pair ===
Rank	Runs	Innings	Players	Team	Highest	Average	100/50	ODI career span
1	8,227	176	Sourav Ganguly & Sachin Tendulkar	India	258	47.55	26/29	1992–2007
2	5,992	151	Mahela Jayawardene & Kumar Sangakkara	Sri Lanka	179	41.61	15/32	2000–2015
3	5,806	106	Rohit Sharma & Virat Kohli	India	246	58.06	21/18	2010–2026
4	5,475	108	Tillakaratne Dilshan & Kumar Sangakkara	Sri Lanka	210*	53.67	20/19	2000–2015
5	5,462	144	Marvan Atapattu & Sanath Jayasuriya	Sri Lanka	237	39.29	14/26	1996–2007
Last updated: 15 November 2026

== Individual records (officials) ==
=== Most matches as an umpire ===
Matches	Umpire	Country	ODI Career Span
231	Aleem Dar‡	Pakistan	2000–2023
209	Rudi Koertzen	South Africa	1992–2010
200	Billy Bowden	New Zealand	1995–2016
181	Steve Bucknor	West Indies	1989–2009
174	Daryl Harper	Australia	1994–2011
174	Simon Taufel	Australia	1999–2012
Last updated: 18 July 2022

=== Most matches as a match referee ===
Matches	Referee	Country	ODI Career Span
426	Ranjan Madugalle‡	Sri Lanka	1993–2026
361	Chris Broad‡	England	2004–2024
357	Jeff Crowe	New Zealand	2004–2026
290	Javagal Srinath	India	2006–2026
254	Andy Pycroft	Zimbabwe	2009–2026
Last updated: 15 November 2026

== See also ==
- 438 Match
- List of batsmen who have scored over 10,000 One Day International cricket runs
- List of One Day International cricket hat-tricks
- List of Cricket World Cup records
- List of first-class cricket records
- List of List A cricket records
- List of Twenty20 cricket records
- List of Afghanistan One Day International cricket records
- List of Australia One Day International cricket records
- List of Bangladesh One Day International cricket records
- List of England One Day International cricket records
- List of India One Day International cricket records
- List of Ireland One Day International cricket records
- List of New Zealand One Day International cricket records
- List of Pakistan One Day International cricket records
- List of South Africa One Day International cricket records
- List of Sri Lanka One Day International cricket records
- List of West Indies One Day International cricket records
- List of Zimbabwe One Day International cricket records
- List of Test cricket records
- List of Twenty20 International records
