= West Indian cricket team in Australia in 1984–85 =

International cricket tour

West Indies in Australia 1984-85
- Date: 19 October 1984 – 22 January 1985
- Location: Australia
- Result: West Indies won the 5-test series 3-1
Teams
- Australia: West Indies
Captains
- (Australia) Kim Hughes (Australia) Allan Border: (Cricket West Indies) Clive Lloyd
Most runs
- Kepler Wessels (505) Allan Border (246) Graeme Wood (207): Larry Gomes (451); Clive Lloyd (356); Viv Richards (342)
Most wickets
- Geoff Lawson (23) Bob Holland (14) Rodney Hogg (11): Malcolm Marshall (28); Joel Garner (19); Michael Holding (15)

The West Indies cricket team toured Australia in the 1984–85 season and played 5 Test matches against Australia. West Indies won the series 3–1 with one match drawn. The West Indies won the first three Tests quite easily against a very weak Australian team. Then captain Kim Hughes lost the captaincy due to his and the Australian Cricket Team's poor form after the Second Test and Allan Border took over. The Fourth Test at Melbourne ended West Indies' then world record of 11 consecutive Test wins as Australia held out for a draw. West Indies lost the Fifth Test by an innings at Sydney where Clive Lloyd played the last of his 110 Tests.

== Test series summary ==
=== First Test ===
9–12 November 1984
(5-day match)
Scorecard

West Indies	v	Australia
416 (123 overs); PJL Dujon 139 (158); TM Alderman 6/128 (39 overs)		76 (31.2 overs); WB Phillips 22 (24); MA Holding 6/21 (9.2 overs)
		228 (f/o) (70.3 overs); GM Wood 56 (76); MD Marshall 4/68 (21 overs)

West Indies won by an innings and 112 runs
Western Australia Cricket Association Ground, Perth
Umpires: AR Crafter and PJ McConnell
Player of the match: MA Holding (WIN)

- Australia won the toss and elected to field.
- The match was scheduled for five days but completed in four.
- CA Walsh (WIN) made his Test debut.

Courtney Walsh was selected for his Test debut, and would go on to have a stellar career for the West Indies, taking over 500 wickets.

Midway through the opening day, it seemed like Kim Hughes' decision to field first was the right one. Two days of rain in Perth before the match had left the pitch unpredictable, and swing bowler Terry Alderman, playing in his first Test since his altercation with a pitch invader at the same ground two years before, took four wickets for five runs in 26 balls to have the West Indies at 104 for five, after Gordon Greenidge and Desmond Haynes had put together an opening partnership of 83. Jeff Dujon and Larry Gomes steadied the innings, leaving the West Indies at 211 for six at stumps on the first day. Dujon had actually taken a blow to the head from Alderman, and had to go off briefly due to complaints of blurred vision.

The pair batted all the way through until an hour after lunch on the second day, putting together 149 runs for the seventh wicket, before Dujon was caught behind off Alderman for a well-made 139 which included 21 fours. Gomes was the last man out, by which time he too had made a century (127) and the West Indies had scored 416.

Australia got off to a dreadful start, limping to 36 for three at the end of day two, and then collapsing to be all out for 76, their lowest ever innings against the West Indies. Michael Holding took six wickets in eight overs, his 13th haul of five or more wickets in an innings in Test cricket. The Australians were forced to follow on, and lost Kepler Wessels in the first over. John Dyson and Graeme Wood provided some resistance with a 90-run partnership. They were helped in some part by giant paceman Joel Garner, who was no-balled six times in one over! But after they were removed, the middle order again provided feeble resistance, and only a final wicket stand of 59 between Alderman and Geoff Lawson delayed the inevitable innings victory until early on the fourth day.

=== Second Test ===
23–26 November 1984
(5-day match)
Scorecard

Australia	v	West Indies
175 (55.4 overs); WB Phillips 44 (56); J Garner 4/67 (18.4 overs)		424 (112.4 overs); RB Richardson 138 (232); GF Lawson 5/116 (30.4 overs)
271 (90 overs); KC Wessels 61 (90); MD Marshall 5/82 (34 overs)		2/26 (9.1 overs); HA Gomes 9* (20); GF Lawson 0/10 (5 overs)

West Indies won by 8 wickets
Brisbane Cricket Ground, Woolloongabba, Brisbane
Umpires: RA French and MW Johnson
Player of the match: CH Lloyd (WIN)

- West Indies won the toss and elected to field.
- The match was scheduled for five days but completed in four.
- DC Boon and RG Holland (both AUS) made their Test debuts.

=== Third Test ===
7–11 December 1984
(5-day match)
Scorecard

West Indies	v	Australia
356 (122.2 overs); CG Greenidge 95 (180); GF Lawson 8/112 (40 overs)		284 (97 overs); KC Wessels 98 (164); MD Marshall 5/69 (26 overs)
7/292d (79.1 overs); HA Gomes 120* (218); GF Lawson 3/77 (21 overs)		173 (50.5 overs); KC Wessels 70 (86); MD Marshall 5/38 (15.5 overs)

West Indies won by 191 runs
Adelaide Oval, Adelaide
Umpires: AR Crafter and MW Johnson
Player of the match: GF Lawson (AUS)

- West Indies won the toss and elected to bat.

=== Fourth Test ===
22–27 December 1984
(5-day match)
Scorecard

West Indies	v	Australia
479 (125.3 overs); IVA Richards 208 (245); GF Lawson 3/108 (37 overs)		296 (91.5 overs); KC Wessels 90 (151); MD Marshall 5/86 (31.5 overs)
5/186d (58 overs); DL Haynes 63 (99); CJ McDermott 3/65 (21 overs)		8/198 (87 overs); AMJ Hilditch 113 (273); J Garner 3/49 (19 overs)

Match Drawn
Melbourne Cricket Ground, Melbourne
Umpires: PJ McConnell and SG Randell
Player of the match: AMJ Hilditch (AUS)

- Australia won the toss and elected to field.
- 25 December was taken as a rest day.
- MJ Bennett and CJ McDermott (both AUS) made their Test debuts.

=== Fifth Test ===
30 December 1984–2 January 1985
(5-day match)
Scorecard

Australia	v	West Indies
9/471d (156.2 overs); KC Wessels 173 (351); MA Holding 3/74 (31 overs)		163 (62.4 overs); DL Haynes 34 (82); RG Holland 6/54 (22 overs)
		253 (f/o) (84 overs); CH Lloyd 72 (122); RG Holland 4/90 (33 overs)

Australia won by an innings and 55 runs
Sydney Cricket Ground, Sydney
Umpires: RC Isherwood and MW Johnson
Player of the match: RG Holland (AUS)

- Australia won the toss and elected to bat.
- The match was scheduled for five days but completed in four.

== World Series Cup ==
West Indies went through the qualifying round of 10 matches unbeaten against Australia and Sri Lanka. The first final though was won by Australia, the West Indies fought back to win the second. This demoralised the Aussies as they easily lost the third.
