= Eldine Baptiste =

West Indian cricketer

Personal information
- Full name: Eldine Ashworth Elderfield Baptiste
- Born: 12 March 1960 (age 66); Liberta, Antigua, West Indies Federation
- Batting: Right-handed
- Bowling: Right-arm fast-medium

International information
- National side: West Indies
- Test debut (cap 179): 21 October 1983 v India
- Last Test: 12 April 1990 v England
- ODI debut (cap 39): 13 October 1983 v India
- Last ODI: 15 March 1990 v England

Domestic team information
- Years: Team
- 1981–1987: Kent
- 1981/82–1990/91: Leeward Islands
- 1991: Northamptonshire
- 1991/92–1998/99: Eastern Province
- 1999/00–2000/01: KwaZulu-Natal

Career statistics
Competition	Test	ODI	FC	LA
Matches	10	43	245	310
Runs scored	233	184	8,070	2,732
Batting average	23.30	15.33	27.73	16.35
100s/50s	0/1	0/0	3/47	0/9
Top score	87*	31	136*	65
Balls bowled	1,362	2,214	41,503	14,724
Wickets	16	36	723	365
Bowling average	35.18	41.97	24.65	26.69
5 wickets in innings	0	0	32	4
10 wickets in match	0	0	4	0
Best bowling	3/31	2/10	8/76	6/13
Catches/stumpings	2/–	14/–	120/–	98/–
- Source: Cricinfo, 19 October 2010

Eldine Ashworth Elderfield Baptiste (born 12 March 1960) is an Antiguan former professional cricketer. He played in 10 Test matches – all of which resulted in West Indian victories – and 43 One Day Internationals (ODI) for the West Indies, between 1983 and 1990.

== Cricket career ==
Born at Liberta, Antigua in 1960, Baptiste was a hard-hitting right-handed batsman and a right-arm fast-medium bowler. Although he was born in Antigua, Baptiste's first-class and List A career began in England, playing for Kent County Cricket Club in June 1981, and finished in South Africa, playing for KwaZulu-Natal in the Champions Cup 2000–01 in April 2001. He was initially contracted to play for Kent, having been identified as a promising bowling all-rounder by the county's manager Colin Page as an 18-year old in 1979. After playing 27 matches in 1981, the rules regarding overseas players in English cricket were tightened the following season and Baptiste only played in 13 matches, taking just 15 wickets in 1982. By the following season, however, Asif Iqbal, who had kept Baptiste out of the Kent side, had retired and he played regularly, playing a "full-part" in the county's side during the season, scoring 755 County Championship runs and taking 50 wickets and was awarded his county cap.

After first playing for the Leewards Islands in the 1981–82 domestic season, Baptiste was called into the West Indies side for the side's tour of India in 1983, having impressed selectors during the English summer. He played in the World Series Cup in Australia at the beginning of 1984, and then for the West Indies against Australia on their tour of the Caribbean later in the year before being selected for the West Indies tour of England during 1984. As a result, he did not play for Kent during the 1984 season, with the county signing Australian Terry Alderman as a replacement. He played in all five Test matches during the 1984 tour of England, but although he toured Australia the following winter, he did not play in any of the international matches during the tour. He was back in the ODI side for New Zealand's tour of the West Indies in early 1985, but only played in one further Test match, having to wait until 1990 to do so.

After playing regularly for Kent in 1985, both Alderman and Baptiste were contracted by the county in 1986, with the Australian primarily playing in first-class matches and Baptiste, who was considered "more versatile", played mainly in one-day matches. A groin injury towards the end of the following season saw him unable to complete his contract, although he played in 32 matches and took 56 first-class and 15 one-day wickets. He was replaced by Roy Pienaar in the side. Pienaar was retained for the 1988 season, although Baptiste played one more top-level English season, playing for Northants in 1991, taking 50 Championship wickets.

Baptiste played his final international matches during England's 1990 tour of the West Indies and his final matches for the Leeward Islands during the same season. During the 1990s, he played primarily in South Africa for Eastern Province and KwaZulu-Natal.

Baptiste's highest first-class score was 136 not out for Kent against Yorkshire in 1983, when he added 228 for the fifth wicket with Chris Cowdrey. His best bowling figures of eight for 76 were against Warwickshire in 1987 in one of his final appearances for the side.

== Retirement ==
Since finishing his playing career, Baptiste has held a number of coaching positions, including with KwaZulu-Natal, Antigua and Stanford Superstars. In 2009 he was appointed Head Coach of the Kenya national cricket team and in 2013 the coach of the Leeward Islands cricket team.

== Bibliography ==
- Ellis, Clive; Pennell, Mark (2010). Trophies and Tribulations: Forty Years of Kent Cricket. London: Greenwich Publishing. ISBN 978-09-56408-10-5.
