= Richard Gabriel =

Richard Gabriel may refer to:

- Richard P. Gabriel (born 1949), expert on the Lisp programming language
- Richard S. Gabriel (born 1952), West Indian cricketer
- Richard A. Gabriel, historian and author
- Richard L. Gabriel (born 1962), a Justice of the Colorado Supreme Court

== See also ==
- Gabriel Richard (1767–1832), French Roman Catholic priest and founder of the University of Michigan
