= International cricket in 1983–84 =

International cricket season

The 1983–84 international cricket season was from September 1983 to April 1984.

== Season overview ==
International tours
Start date	Home team	Away team	Results [Matches]			
Start date	Home team	Away team	Test	ODI	FC	LA
11 September 1983	India	Pakistan	0–0 [3]	2–0 [2]	—	—
13 October 1983	India	West Indies	0–3 [6]	0–5 [5]	—	—
11 November 1983	Australia	Pakistan	2–0 [5]	—	—	—
20 January 1984	New Zealand	England	1–0 [3]	1–2 [3]	—	—
29 February 1984	West Indies	Australia	3–0 [5]	3–1 [4]	—	—
2 March 1984	Pakistan	England	1–0 [3]	1–1 [2]	—	—
3 March 1984	Sri Lanka	New Zealand	0–2 [3]	1–2 [3]	—	—
International tournaments
Start date	Tournament				Winners	
8 January 1984	(Australia) 1983–84 Benson & Hedges World Series				West Indies	
6 April 1984	(United Arab Emirates) 1984 Asia Cup				India	

== September ==
=== Pakistan in India ===
Test series
No.	Date	Home captain	Away captain	Venue	Result
Test 961	14–19 September	Kapil Dev	Zaheer Abbas	M Chinnaswamy Stadium, Bangalore	Match Drawn
Test 962	24–29 September	Kapil Dev	Zaheer Abbas	Gandhi Stadium, Jalandhar	Match Drawn
Test 963	5–10 October	Kapil Dev	Zaheer Abbas	Vidarbha Cricket Association Ground, Nagpur	Match Drawn
ODI series
No.	Date	Home captain	Away captain	Venue	Result
ODI 224	10 September	Kapil Dev	Zaheer Abbas	Lal Bahadur Shastri Stadium, Hyderabad	India by 4 wickets
ODI 225	5 October	Kapil Dev	Zaheer Abbas	Sawai Mansingh Stadium, Jaipur	India by 4 wickets

== October ==
=== West Indies in India ===
Test series
No.	Date	Home captain	Away captain	Venue	Result
Test 964	21–25 October	Kapil Dev	Clive Lloyd	Green Park Stadium, Kanpur	West Indies by an innings and 83 runs
Test 965	29 October–3 November	Kapil Dev	Clive Lloyd	Feroz Shah Kotla, New Delhi	Match Drawn
Test 967	12–16 November	Kapil Dev	Clive Lloyd	Gujarat Stadium, Ahmedabad	West Indies by 138 runs
Test 968	24–29 November	Kapil Dev	Clive Lloyd	Wankhede Stadium, Bombay	Match Drawn
Test 971	10–14 December	Kapil Dev	Clive Lloyd	Eden Garden, Calcutta	West Indies by an innings and 46 runs
Test 972	24–29 December	Kapil Dev	Clive Lloyd	M. A. Chidambaram Stadium, Madras	Match Drawn
ODI series
No.	Date	Home captain	Away captain	Venue	Result
ODI 226	13 October	Kapil Dev	Clive Lloyd	Sher-i-Kashmir Stadium, Srinagar	West Indies by 26 runs
ODI 227	9 November	Kapil Dev	Clive Lloyd	Moti Bagh Stadium, Vadodara	West Indies by 4 wickets
ODI 228	1 December	Kapil Dev	Clive Lloyd	Nehru Stadium, Indore	West Indies by 8 wickets
ODI 229	7 December	Kapil Dev	Clive Lloyd	Keenan Stadium, Jamshedpur	West Indies by 104 runs
ODI 230	17 December	Kapil Dev	Clive Lloyd	Nehru Stadium, Guwahati	West Indies by 6 wickets

== November ==
=== Pakistan in Australia ===
Test series
No.	Date	Home captain	Away captain	Venue	Result
Test 966	11–14 November	Kim Hughes	Zaheer Abbas	WACA Ground, Perth	Australia by an innings and 9 runs
Test 969	25–29 November	Kim Hughes	Zaheer Abbas	Brisbane Cricket Ground, Brisbane	Match Drawn
Test 970	9–13 December	Kim Hughes	Zaheer Abbas	Adelaide Oval, Adelaide	Match Drawn
Test 973	26–30 December	Kim Hughes	Zaheer Abbas	Melbourne Cricket Ground, Melbourne	Match Drawn
Test 974	2–6 January	Kim Hughes	Zaheer Abbas	Sydney Cricket Ground, Sydney	Australia by 10 wickets

== January ==
=== 1983–84 Benson & Hedges World Series ===
Group Stage
No.	Date	Team 1	Captain 1	Team 2	Captain 2	Venue	Result
ODI 231	8 January	Australia	Kim Hughes	West Indies	Clive Lloyd	Melbourne Cricket Ground, Melbourne	West Indies by 27 runs
ODI 232	10 January	Australia	Kim Hughes	Pakistan	Imran Khan	Sydney Cricket Ground, Sydney	Australia by 34 runs
ODI 233	12 January	West Indies	Clive Lloyd	Pakistan	Imran Khan	Melbourne Cricket Ground, Melbourne	Pakistan by 97 runs
ODI 234	14 January	Pakistan	Imran Khan	West Indies	Clive Lloyd	Brisbane Cricket Ground, Brisbane	West Indies by 5 wickets
ODI 235	15 January	Australia	Kim Hughes	Pakistan	Imran Khan	Brisbane Cricket Ground, Brisbane	No result
ODI 236	17 January	Australia	Kim Hughes	West Indies	Clive Lloyd	Sydney Cricket Ground, Sydney	West Indies by 28 runs
ODI 237	19 January	Pakistan	Imran Khan	West Indies	Clive Lloyd	Sydney Cricket Ground, Sydney	West Indies by 5 wicket
ODI 238	21 January	Australia	Kim Hughes	Pakistan	Imran Khan	Melbourne Cricket Ground, Melbourne	Australia by 43 runs
ODI 239	22 January	Australia	Kim Hughes	West Indies	Clive Lloyd	Melbourne Cricket Ground, Melbourne	West Indies by 26 runs
ODI 240	25 January	Australia	Kim Hughes	Pakistan	Imran Khan	Sydney Cricket Ground, Sydney	Australia by 87 runs
ODI 241	28 January	Pakistan	Imran Khan	West Indies	Clive Lloyd	Adelaide Oval, Adelaide	West Indies by 1 wicket
ODI 242	29 January	Australia	Kim Hughes	West Indies	Clive Lloyd	Adelaide Oval, Adelaide	West Indies by 6 wickets
ODI 243	30 January	Australia	Kim Hughes	Pakistan	Javed Miandad	Adelaide Oval, Adelaide	Australia by 70 runs
ODI 244	4 February	Pakistan	Javed Miandad	West Indies	Sir Vivian Richards	WACA Ground, Perth	West Indies by 7 wickets
ODI 245	5 February	Australia	Kim Hughes	West Indies	Clive Lloyd	WACA Ground, Perth	Australia by 14 runs
Finals
ODI 246	8 February	Australia	Kim Hughes	West Indies	Clive Lloyd	Sydney Cricket Ground, Sydney	West Indies by 9 wickets
ODI 247	11 February	Australia	Kim Hughes	West Indies	Clive Lloyd	Melbourne Cricket Ground, Melbourne	Match Tied
ODI 248	12 February	Australia	Kim Hughes	West Indies	Michael Holding	Melbourne Cricket Ground, Melbourne	West Indies by 6 wickets

=== England in New Zealand ===
Test series
No.	Date	Home captain	Away captain	Venue	Result
Test 975	20–24 January	Geoff Howarth	Bob Willis	Basin Reserve, Wellington	Match Drawn
Test 976	3–5 February	Geoff Howarth	Bob Willis	Lancaster Park, Christchurch	New Zealand by an innings and 132 runs
Test 977	10–15 February	Geoff Howarth	Bob Willis	Eden Park, Auckland	Match Drawn
ODI series
No.	Date	Home captain	Away captain	Venue	Result
ODI 249	18 February	Geoff Howarth	Bob Willis	Lancaster Park, Christchurch	England by 54 runs
ODI 250	22 February	Geoff Howarth	Bob Willis	Basin Reserve, Wellington	England by 6 wickets
ODI 251	25 February	Geoff Howarth	Bob Willis	Eden Park, Auckland	New Zealand by 7 wickets

== February ==
=== Australia in the West Indies ===
ODI series
No.	Date	Home captain	Away captain	Venue	Result
ODI 252	29 February	Sir Vivian Richards	Kim Hughes	Albion Sports Complex, Albion	West Indies by 6 wickets
ODI 255	14 March	Clive Lloyd	Kim Hughes	Queen's Park Oval, Port of Spain	Australia by 4 wickets
ODI 262	19 April	Michael Holding	Kim Hughes	Mindoo Philip Park, Castries	West Indies by 7 wickets
ODI 263	26 April	Sir Vivian Richards	Kim Hughes	Sabina Park, Kingston	West Indies by 9 wickets
Frank Worrell Trophy - Test series
No.	Date	Home captain	Away captain	Venue	Result
Test 979	2–7 March	Clive Lloyd	Kim Hughes	Bourda, Georgetown	Match Drawn
Test 983	16–21 March	Sir Vivian Richards	Kim Hughes	Queen's Park Oval, Port of Spain	Match Drawn
Test 986	30 March-4 April	Clive Lloyd	Kim Hughes	Kensington Oval, Bridgetown	West Indies by 10 wickets
Test 987	7–11 April	Clive Lloyd	Kim Hughes	Antigua Recreation Ground, St. John's	West Indies by an innings and 36 runs
Test 988	28 April-2 May	Clive Lloyd	Kim Hughes	Sabina Park, Kingston	West Indies by 10 wickets

== March ==
=== England in Pakistan ===
Test series
No.	Date	Home captain	Away captain	Venue	Result
Test 978	2–6 March	Zaheer Abbas	Bob Willis	National Stadium, Karachi	Pakistan by 3 wickets
Test 981	12–17 March	Zaheer Abbas	Bob Willis	Iqbal Stadium, Faisalabad	Match Drawn
Test 984	19–24 March	Zaheer Abbas	Bob Willis	Gaddafi Stadium, Lahore	Match Drawn
ODI series
No.	Date	Home captain	Away captain	Venue	Result
ODI 254	9 March	Zaheer Abbas	Bob Willis	Gaddafi Stadium, Lahore	Pakistan by 6 wickets
ODI 256	14 March	Zaheer Abbas	Bob Willis	National Stadium, Karachi	England by 6 wickets

=== New Zealand in Sri Lanka ===
Test series
No.	Date	Home captain	Away captain	Venue	Result
Test 980	9–14 March	Duleep Mendis	Geoff Howarth	Asgiriya Stadium, Kandy	New Zealand by 165 runs
Test 982	16–21 March	Duleep Mendis	Geoff Howarth	Sinhalese Sports Club, Colombo	Match drawn
Test 985	24–29 March	Duleep Mendis	Geoff Howarth	Colombo Cricket Club, Colombo	New Zealand by an innings 61 runs
ODI series
No.	Date	Home captain	Away captain	Venue	Result
ODI 253	3 March	Duleep Mendis	Geoff Howarth	Sinhalese Sports Club, Colombo	New Zealand by 101 runs
ODI 257	31 March	Duleep Mendis	Geoff Howarth	Tyronne Fernando Stadium, Moratuwa	Sri Lanka by 41 runs
ODI 258	1 April	Duleep Mendis	Geoff Howarth	P Sara Oval, Colombo	New Zealand by 86 runs

== April ==
=== 1984 Asia Cup ===
Team	P	W	L	T	NR	NRR	Points
India	2	2	0	0	0	+4.212	8
Sri Lanka	2	1	1	0	0	+3.059	4
Pakistan	2	0	2	0	0	+3.489	0

Asia Cup
No.	Date	Team 1	Captain 1	Team 2	Captain 2	Venue	Result
ODI 259	6 April	Pakistan	Zaheer Abbas	Sri Lanka	Duleep Mendis	Sharjah Cricket Stadium, Sharjah	Sri Lanka by 5 wickets
ODI 260	8 April	India	Sunil Gavaskar	Sri Lanka	Duleep Mendis	Sharjah Cricket Stadium, Sharjah	India by 10 wickets
ODI 261	13 April	India	Sunil Gavaskar	Pakistan	Zaheer Abbas	Sharjah Cricket Stadium, Sharjah	India by 54 runs
