= Ray Isherwood =

Australian cricket umpire (1938–2014)

Raymond Charles Isherwood (29 January 1938 – 24 September 2014) was an Australian Test cricket umpire.

Isherwood was born in Melbourne, Victoria. He umpired in three Test matches between 1984 and 1985. His first match was between Australia and the West Indies at Sydney on 30 December 1984 to 2 January 1985, won by Australia by an innings and 55 runs, upsetting the powerful West Indians on a turning pitch. Kepler Wessels scored 173 and Bob Holland took 10 wickets. Isherwood's partner was Mel Johnson. Wisden reported that "relations between the teams, already strained following incidents earlier in the series, were further affected by a verbal clash … following an unsuccessful appeal. The umpires reported the matter to the Australian Cricket Board, but no action was taken against the players involved."

Isherwood's last Test match was between Australia and India at Melbourne on 26 December to 30 December 1985, a drawn match. Allan Border and Greg Matthews scored centuries, and Bruce Reid took 6 of the 12 Indian wickets to fall. Isherwood’s colleague was Dick French.

Isherwood umpired 21 One Day International (ODI) matches between 1979 and 1986. Altogether, he umpired 30 first-class matches in his career between 1971 and 1985, the Test match against India being his last.

Off the field Isherwood was a manager for an electrical retailer.

He died in Adelaide, South Australia.

== See also ==
- List of Test cricket umpires
- List of One Day International cricket umpires
