= Vinothen John =

Sri Lankan cricketer (born 1960)

Personal information
- Full name: Vinothen John Bede Jeyarajasingham
- Born: 27 May 1960 (age 66); Colombo, Sri Lanka
- Batting: Right-handed
- Bowling: Right-arm medium-fast

International information
- National side: Sri Lanka (1975–1982)
- Test debut (cap 5): 4 March 1983 v New Zealand
- Last Test: 23 August 1984 v England
- ODI debut (cap 27): 12 September 1982 v India
- Last ODI: 30 October 1987 v England

Career statistics
Competition	Test	ODI	FC	LA
Matches	6	45	21	56
Runs scored	53	84	127	90
Batting average	10.59	9.33	9.07	9.00
100s/50s	0/0	0/0	1/5	0/0
Top score	27*	15	27*	3*
Balls bowled	1,281	2,311	3,603	2,827
Wickets	28	34	74	43
Bowling average	21.92	48.67	25.33	45.58
5 wickets in innings	2	0	6	6
10 wickets in match	0	0	0	0
Best bowling	5/60	3/28	6/58	3/22
Catches/stumpings	2/–	5/–	4/–	6/–
- Source: Cricinfo, 9 February 2016

Vinothen Bede John (born 27 May 1960) is a former Sri Lankan cricketer who played in six Test matches and 45 One Day Internationals between 1982 and 1987.

== Domestic career ==
After attending St Peter's College, Colombo, John played for the Nondescripts Cricket Club, Bloomfield Cricket and Athletic Club, Moratuwa Sports Club, Sinhalese Sports Club and continuously for over two decades in the Nationalised Services Cricket Tournament, representing the Ceylon Petroleum Corporation.

== International career ==
John made his Test debut in Lancaster Park in New Zealand and had the scalps of Glenn Turner and Sir Richard Hadlee. The stocky right-arm seamer opened the bowling for Sri Lanka in the eighties in Tests and ODIs.

John's Test career ended in the famous Lord's Test against England where he captured four wickets for 98 runs. He played six Tests, claiming an impressive 28 wickets (average 21.92), and took 34 ODI wickets (48.67) in 45 matches before retiring after the 1987 Cricket World Cup.
