= Bruce Martin (umpire) =

Australian cricket umpire (born 1942)

Bruce Edward Martin (born 11 June 1942 in South Australia) was an Australian Test cricket match umpire, from South Australia.

He umpired one Test match in 1985 between Australia and New Zealand at Sydney on 30 December 1984 to 2 January 1985, won by Australia by 4 wickets in a come-from-behind effort led by David Boon and Wayne Phillips with the bat, and 10 wickets by Bob Holland. Martin's partner was Mel Johnson.

Martin umpired 25 One Day International (ODI) matches between 1981 and 1987. All together, he umpired 31 first-class matches in his career between 1979 and 1987.

== See also ==
- List of Test cricket umpires
- List of One Day International cricket umpires
