= Richard S. Gabriel =

West Indian cricketer (born 1952)

Richard Gabriel
Personal information
- Full name: Richard Simeon Gabriel
- Born: 5 June 1952 (age 74); Point Fortin, Trinidad and Tobago
- Batting: Right-handed
- Bowling: Right-arm off break
- Role: Opening batsman

International information
- National side: West Indies
- ODI debut: 8 January 1984 v Australia
- Last ODI: 11 February 1984 v Australia

Domestic team information
- Years: Team
- 1968-69 to 1985-86: Trinidad and Tobago

Career statistics
Competition	ODIs	FC	LA
Matches	11	84	33
Runs scored	167	3,974	697
Batting average	15.18	28.58	22.48
100s/50s	0/0	5/18	1/2
Top score	41	129	108*
Balls bowled	0	130	14
Wickets	–	4	1
Bowling average	–	13.50	14.00
5 wickets in innings	–	0	0
10 wickets in match	–	0	0
Best bowling	–	3/15	1/8
Catches/stumpings	1/–	70/–	7/–
- Source: Cricket Archive, 19 October 2010

Richard Simeon Gabriel (born 5 June 1952) is a former West Indian cricketer. He played 11 One Day Internationals for the West Indies in 1983-84.

An opening batsman, Gabriel made his debut for Trinidad and Tobago aged just 16 years old in 1969. He was the youngest player to play for the national team. In 1970 he was one of the leading batsmen for the West Indies youth team on their unbeaten tour of England.

He represented West Indies during the 1983-84 Benson & Hedges World Series Cup One day International tournament in Australia, replacing an injured Gordon Greenidge. He played all of his 11 internationals in Australia that season, between 8 January and 11 February 1984, opening the batting. He scored 167 runs at an average of 15.18.

He played for Trinidad and Tobago from 1969 till 1986.
