= Kepler Wessels =

Australian and South African cricketer

Personal information
- Full name: Kepler Christoffel Wessels
- Born: 14 September 1957 (age 69); Bloemfontein, Orange Free State Province, Union of South Africa
- Batting: Left-handed
- Bowling: Right arm off break Right arm medium
- Role: Batsman
- Relatives: Riki Wessels (son)

International information
- National sides: Australia (1982–1985); South Africa (1991–1994)
- Test debut (cap 317/246): 26 November 1982; Australia v England
- Last Test: 18 August 1994; South Africa v England
- ODI debut (cap 71/11): 9 January 1983; Australia v New Zealand
- Last ODI: 28 October 1994; South Africa v Pakistan

Domestic team information
- Years: Team
- 1973/74–1975/76: Orange Free State
- 1976–1980: Sussex
- 1976/77: Western Province
- 1977/78: Northern Transvaal
- 1979/80–1985/86: Queensland
- 1986/87–1997/98: Eastern Province
- 1998/99–1999/00: Griqualand West

Career statistics
Competition	Test	ODI	FC	LA
Matches	40 (Note: 24 Tests for Australia, 16 for South Africa)	109 (Note: 54 ODIs for Australia, 55 for South Africa)	316	337
Runs scored	2,788	3,367	24,738	12,503
Batting average	41.00	34.35	50.58	41.53
100s/50s	6/15	1/26	66/132	15/90
Top score	179	107	254	146
Balls bowled	90	90	1,416	1,327
Wickets	0	18	13	36
Bowling average	–	37.00	44.15	31.11
5 wickets in innings	–	0	0	0
10 wickets in match	–	0	0	0
Best bowling	–	2/16	2/25	4/24
Catches/stumpings	30/–	49/–	268/–	151/–
- Source: CricketArchive, 10 November 2008

Kepler Christoffel Wessels (born 14 September 1957) is a South African-Australian cricket commentator and former cricketer who captained South Africa after playing 24 Tests for Australia. Since retiring he has been a lawn bowls competitor.

He was a left-handed opening batsman. He played first-class cricket for Orange Free State, Western Province, Northern Transvaal, Eastern Province and Griqualand West in South Africa, for Queensland in Australia and Sussex in England. In 2008, he coached the Indian Premier League franchise Chennai Super Kings and later returned to coaching in South Africa.

== Early years ==
Wessels was six years old when he was introduced to the game of cricket. Volsteedt taught him the basics of the game and began to regularly play cricket with him during Sunday visits to the Wessels household. A few years later, Volsteedt became the master in charge of cricket at Grey College, Bloemfontein, and coached Wessels during his playing days for the school's first team.

From a very early age, Wessels showed exceptional sporting talent. By the age of 12, he was playing rugby union for the Free State primary schools team and he was one of the leading schoolboy swimmers in the province. However, after a close encounter with death, due to nephritis, Kepler's father decided that his son would no longer be allowed to participate in swimming.

Wessels decided to switch to cricket, even though the rules of Grey College did not allow him to play at such a young age. With the help of Johan Volsteedt (who was the first team captain), Wessels was allowed to participate in the net practices and soon cricket became his main activity during summer. During winter, he played tennis, at which he won so frequently that, by 1973, he was the number 1 under-16 player in South Africa and was offered a scholarship of $25 000 over four years from the University of Houston. However, due to the fact that he played as an under-16 against adults, Wessels began to lose regularly in senior tournaments. After a dramatic loss during the Griqualand West Open in Kimberley – after which he cut all the strings from his racket in the changing room – Wessels turned down the offer from Houston and decided to focus all his attention on cricket.

As a young cricket player, Wessels scored his first century at the age of nine and was taken into the Free State under-13 side during the same year, getting scores of 80, 80, 88 and 121 against players four years his senior. By the end of 1969, his batting average for Grey College (after nine innings) was 259.59. He was selected to represent the Free State schools side at the prestigious Nuffield Week for five consecutive seasons; and was selected three times for the South African schools side, the third season as captain.

Wessels finished his high school cricket career with an innings of 130 not out, during a home game for Grey College, against rival Queen's College from the Eastern Cape. His superb innings laid the foundation for Grey's first victory over Queen's in 18 years.

He played his first first-class match at the age of 16, batting at number nine and making 32 for Orange Free State in a team captained by the Test veteran Colin Bland. At 18 he was playing professionally in England, opening the batting for Sussex.

== World Series Cricket ==
In the late 1970s, Wessels was drafted by Kerry Packer to play for the Australian World Series Cricket Team. As a South African with little hope of playing Test cricket for his country, Wessels joined the "circus" to take advantage of the better pay and conditions that the WSC offered.

He arrived in Sydney at the age of 21 and was put on trial at the local Waverley club, for Packer to see first if Wessels was decent material for World Series Cricket. After scoring 123 against Penrith, newspapers started speculating about a place for Wessels in the New South Wales state side. The media was unaware that Wessels had already signed for Packer. An innings of 137 followed against the Sydney club side and the selectors immediately named him in the state training squad. That was the signal Packer needed and he quickly called a press conference to announce that Wessels would be playing World Series Cricket instead.

Packer saw in Wessels a reliable opening batsman – something that the Australian WSC side was in serious need of. To help him find his feet in the new environment, Wessels played a couple of games for the second-string Cavaliers side. During his first game, two short balls had struck him in the ribs and on the chest, and in both cases, he refused to leave the field and battled on to score a 54 from the innings.

Finally, Wessels was included in the Australian XI, for a one-day game against the WSC World XI, which included four fellow South Africans. He scored 20, made 21 in the next game and then got 92 against the Cavaliers side. A Supertest against a 'Rest of the World' side followed in Melbourne, but Wessels scored only eight in the first innings. In the second innings, he managed to get to 46. He regained some respect, however, during the next Supertest against the WSC West Indies, by scoring 126 in his first innings. During the Supertest final between Australia and the World XI, Wessels scored 27 in his first innings, but experienced a miserable second one. Australia lost by five wickets.

The one-day series involved a best-of-five final between Australia and the West Indies and Wessels scored an unbeaten 136 during the first match which was the only century in the WSC International Cup, during one of the finest one-day innings of his career. He scored 40 and 70 from the next two games respectively, after which the West Indies led the series 2–1. They won the series during the fourth match, thanks to a better run-rate, when Australia couldn't finish bowling their 50 overs by the scheduled end of the match at 10:30 p. m.

A third leg to the World Series was due to be played in the West Indies, but Wessels was forced to stay behind, because he still held a South African passport and would not be granted visas for the Caribbean. It was the end of his World Series Cricket experience, as Packer reached a settlement with the Australian Cricket Board in 1979. The World Series was disbanded after that.

== Australian international career ==
=== 1982/83 England tour of Australia – debut ===
Wessels stayed in Australia to qualify for the Australian Test side, playing for Queensland, and made his debut against England at The Gabba in Brisbane on 26 November 1982. He became the first South-African born person to play for Australia, and the 13th Australian player to score a century on debut. Wessels dominated the English bowling, with scores of 162 in the first innings and 46 in the second. He was instrumental in Australia's victory by seven wickets and was given the "Man of the Match" award. He eventually played four Tests in his debut series and scored 386 runs at an average of 48.25.

=== 1982/83 Australian tour of Sri Lanka ===
In April 1983, Australia played their inaugural Test match against Sri Lanka. Wessels continued his good form with 141, thus becoming the first overseas player to score a century in Sri Lanka. He was named "man of the match" in Australia's innings victory.

=== 1983 World Cup ===
Wessels also played in the 1983 World Cup. He made 76 against Zimbabwe but it was not enough to save Australia from defeat. After failing against West Indies and India, he was dropped from the side.

=== 1983/84 Pakistan tour of Australia ===
Wessels played in each of the five Tests against Pakistan, scoring 256 runs at an average of 42.66. This included 179 in the third Test, which remained his top score. Despite this moderately good form, Wessels was outscored by five other Australian players who took advantage of the poor quality Pakistan bowling.

Greg Chappell, Dennis Lillee and Rod Marsh all retired from Australian cricket at the end of the series, and much was expected of Wessels (and others) to score consistently in the upcoming series against the West Indies.

=== 1983/84 Australian tour of West Indies ===
Any hope that Wessels and other new Australian batsmen would cope against the West Indian fast bowling was dashed. Wessels scored 4 and 20 in the first Test and 4 and 4 in the second Test, before injury ruled him out of the rest of the series. He was dismissed by West Indian fast bowler Joel Garner three times, and was nicknamed "Joel's bunny" as a result. For the first time in his Test career, Wessels' form had deserted him and he was not a certainty for selection when the West Indians toured Australia in 1984/85. However he won man of the series during a five-match one day tour of India in September and October 1984.

=== 1984/85 West Indian tour of Australia ===
As a Test player, Wessels' most successful period came during the disastrous West Indian tour of Australia. After scoring only 13 and 0 in the first Test, Wessels was in danger of being dropped from the Australian side. However, due to the poor performance of almost all of Australia's batting in that match, he was retained for the second Test. He responded by going out for 0 after the second ball, and many people thought that his career was over. In the second innings, however, he top scored with 61, giving the selectors no option but to include him for the third Test. Batting up number 3, Wessels top scored again with 98 runs in the first innings and 70 in the second, in a match where the Australian batting was being taken apart by the West Indian bowlers.

The fourth Test saw Wessels continue his heavy scoring, with 90 and 0 helping Australia force a draw. It was in the fifth Test, however, which saw him totally dominate the West Indian bowlers with 173. His batting helped Australia to 9 (declared) for 471, which was a winning total on a wicket that was taking spin.

Wessels scored 505 runs at an average of 56.11 against the West Indies, which was more than double the number of runs scored by any other Australian batsmen during that series. Given the dominance of West Indian bowling at the time, and the fragility of the Australian batting line-up, Wessels' performance during that series was world class.

=== 1985 Australian tour of England ===
Unfortunately, Wessels was unable to maintain his form during the 1985 Ashes Tour of England. Although he scored three fifties (top score 83), Wessels ended the series with 368 runs at an average of 33.45. While this was not a failure, it was certainly below his best. Australia lost the series and suffered two very heavy innings defeats as, Allan Border aside, the batting lineup become increasingly fragile.

It is likely that the impending rebel tour to South Africa affected Wessels' concentration during the 1985 Ashes tour. Because of his South African background, Wessels was seen by many players and officials as one of the major contacts for the Rebel Tour amongst the Australian players. Wessels has steadfastly denied this accusation.

=== 1985/86 New Zealand tour of Australia – Retirement ===
Wessels' final match for Australia was the first Test against New Zealand in Brisbane, 8–12 November 1985. Wessels was alone in resisting the devastating bowling of Richard Hadlee, scoring 70 out of Australia's first innings total of 179. He scored only 3 in the second innings, with Australia suffering its heaviest defeat against New Zealand.

Soon after the match was finished, Wessels announced his retirement, expressing his disillusionment with Australian cricket. He did not realise that 6 years later he would be playing Test Cricket again, this time for his home nation.

== Between Test careers ==
Cricket was still Wessels' profession, and he played a full season (1985/86) of Sheffield Shield Cricket for Queensland where he scored 957 runs at an average of 50.37. He also captained the side in Border's absence, and was unlucky not to captain the first Queensland side to win the Sheffield Shield. The final, between NSW and Queensland, was held in Sydney on 14–18 March 1986. Despite Wessels scoring 166 and 29 in his last match for Queensland, and despite a dominating all-round performance from his team, the match ended in a draw, which allowed NSW to win the Sheffield Shield. Wessels' last act for Queensland was a creditable individual bowling performance of 16–5–26–2, including the wicket of a young Mark Waugh.

After the season finished, Wessels re-settled in South Africa again and began playing, this time for Eastern Province. Before moving to Australia, Wessels had played for Orange Free State, Western Province and Northern Transvaal. He continued to play for Eastern Province from 1986 until his retirement in 2000. His debut with Eastern Province was auspicious, captaining the side to a 212-run victory over Orange Free State, and scoring 133 and 78 against a bowling attack that included a young Allan Donald.

Wessels was also included in the 1986-7 Australian rebel tour to South Africa, where he played for Australia. The series of four "Tests" ended in a 1–0 victory to the South African team, but Wessels scored 327 runs at 54.50, including two centuries in the fourth match. Wessels played with many former Australian teammates in this series, including Kim Hughes, John Dyson, Steve Smith, Rodney Hogg, Carl Rackemann and Terry Alderman. His involvement in this tour re-ignited suspicions that he was one of the covert organizers, but it was the last time Wessels ever represented Australia in cricket.

Frank Heydenrych, writing for the 1991 Wisden, comments upon Eastern Province's success during this season:

...from the way that Kepler Wessels, (the Eastern Province captain), had reinforced their playing squad with high-quality players, it was difficult to see an immediate end to the golden days (and nights) he had brought to Eastern Province.

In 1989/90 Wessels also played for South Africa against a rebel English team captained by Mike Gatting. He scored 1 & 2 in the only match played, which South Africa won.

== Captain of the 'new' South Africa ==
With apartheid being removed from South Africa in 1991, the International Cricket Council unanimously removed the ban against playing South Africa. As a result, South Africa could now play Test and One-day international cricket.

=== The 1992 Cricket World Cup ===
When South Africa played its first Test since March 1970, ten of the eleven players were making their debuts. At 34, Wessels had both the first-class experience of contemporaries such as Clive Rice and Jimmy Cook, but also had experience at Test level that no other South African player had. As a result of these credentials, he was chosen to captain the inexperienced South African side to the 1992 Cricket World Cup, which would signal the country's return to official international cricket. The decision to name Wessels captain over such local heroes as Rice and Cook (who both didn't even make the side) was met by widespread controversy. More than 10 000 signatures were collected for a petition against the dropping of Rice and Cook, while 71 percent of provincial players told the Sunday Times in South Africa, that they had no confidence in the selectors.

Despite the local outrage, Wessels led the unknown South African side in the tournament. Playing against Australia in their opening match, they produced what was arguably the biggest surprise of the tournament, beating the hosts by nine wickets. However, the spectacular victory was followed by consecutive defeats against New Zealand and Sri Lanka. Once again, criticism against Wessels started to mount back in South Africa, with many analysts believing that South Africa's problems were caused by the captain's conservative approach to one-day cricket. South Africa desperately needed to win their next match against the West Indies and, thanks to a vicious bowling assault on their batsmen, the South Africans claimed victory. They won their remaining matches against Pakistan and Zimbabwe, but lost against England. The last group match against India was now vital if they were to reach the semi-finals of the tournament. Rain-delays caused the match to be played 30 overs a side and, once again, South Africa managed to secure victory after India set an imposing target. Wessels and his team were to play against England in Sydney.

Four days before the semi-final, South African President F.W. de Klerk called a referendum on political reform in South Africa, and the result of the vote seemed vital for South Africa's continuing in the Cricket World Cup. Some even suggested that the team would be withdrawn from the tournament, if the result of the referendum had been negative. The result of 68.7% in favour of political reform, ensured not only the cricket team's continuing participation in the tournament, but also the future participation of other South African sports teams in international competitions.

The semi-final against England took place on 22 March 1992 at the Sydney Cricket Ground. England reached a total of 252 for 6 (in 45 overs) and South Africa required a run-rate of 5.62 to win. With 13 balls left in the match, they required 22 more runs, when rain suddenly started pouring down over Sydney. Two overs (or 12 balls) were lost and when play resumed, South Africa's new target was calculated by subtracting the number of runs England had scored in their two least productive overs (those totalling just one run). South Africa thus required 21 runs off one ball, although the scoreboard initially displayed a target of 22. The last ball was played with batsman Brian MacMillan scoring a single, and South Africa lost the semi-final by 19 runs. The team did a lap of honour around the Sydney Cricket Ground, providing one of the most lasting images of the tournament.

=== 1991/92 tour of the West Indies ===
South Africa narrowly lost to a West Indian team featuring such players as Curtly Ambrose, Courtney Walsh, Patrick Patterson, Desmond Haynes and Brian Lara. South Africa, under Wessels' leadership, controlled most of the match but fell for 148 chasing 201 for victory in the final innings. This was blamed on remarkable bowling from the West Indian pacemen, with one reporter commenting; 'They [Walsh and Ambrose] pitched everything on off stump and let a pitch stricken by multiple-personality disorder do the rest. Each perfect delivery was followed by another perfect delivery. It was as if Richie Richardson had found a loophole in the laws that allowed him to unleash the same unplayable bowler from both ends. Fittingly, that Wambrose bloke ended up with 10 wickets.' Wessels contributed 59 and 74 in this Test.

=== 1993/94 tour of Australia and 1994 tour of England ===
During the 1993/94 international season, Wessels' cricketing career reached full circle, as he captained the South African side in a tour to Australia. The first Test match of the tour, in Melbourne, was drawn. The second, and arguably most memorable, test was played out in front of a capacity crowd in Sydney. It turned out to be Wessels' last match of the tour, following a hand injury during play. Shane Warne took seven wickets in the first innings and everything seemed lost for the South Africans. However, thanks to some heroic bowling and batting by the visitors, Australia was eventually set a winning target of 117 runs in the second innings. The home side was bowled out for 110 runs, and South Africa won their first Test match against Australia since 1970. Wessels was forced to return to South Africa because of his injury, thus missing out on the rest of the tour. He was, however, immediately reinstated as captain for the home series against Australia. The series was drawn 1–1, and Wessels was criticised for 'baffling' captaincy in the final Test by failing to declare and allowing the tail to score slowly when South Africa seemed to be in a position to win the match and the series.

He led the side to England in the summer of 1994, drawing the three Test series 1–1. Following a heavy defeat at the Oval, however, where he made the second highest score of 28 with the bat during a major collapse in the second innings, he retired from Test cricket and was replaced as captain by Hansie Cronje.

== After retirement ==
After retiring he coached English county side Northamptonshire from 2003 to 2006. His son, Riki Wessels, also played for the club as a Kolpak player. In 2008, he was chosen to coach the Chennai Super Kings in the Indian Premier League (IPL). He later moved to the Highveld Lions franchise in South Africa as a consultant. In 2018, Wessels became a member of the Cricket Australia Supplementary Referee Panel. As of 2020 he is Director of Coaching and First Grade Coach for the South Brisbane District Cricket Club.

== Criticism ==
Wessels was the subject of much criticism during his cricket career, especially from his country of birth, South Africa. It ranged from doubts over his ability to play one-day cricket, his "ugly" stance to his style of captaining as well as his rather serious approach to the game.

=== Ability to play one-day cricket ===
Wessels was, at times, heavily criticised for his alleged inability to play one-day cricket. Although he played 109 One Day Internationals for both Australia and South Africa, he averaged only 34.35, at a strike rate of 55.3, and scored only one ODI century in his career.

From the Channel Nine commentary box, Tony Greig went as far as to say that Wessels "went through a period when his temperament was totally against everything that one-day cricket stood for." Wessels pointed out that he fulfilled the anchor role in the side and that it was his job to bat throughout an innings. Former Australian captain and teammate Kim Hughes, had publicly supported Wessels on this fact, saying: "Kepler hits so many boundaries that he is always going to score enough runs and, even in one-day cricket, you need someone who can anchor the innings. He's the bloke I want in that role."

Despite the criticism, Wessels collected many player's accolades during his ODI career, including the "Man of the Series" award during the 1983 ODI series against the West Indies, as well as the "Man of the Match" award for his 81 not out against Australia in the 1992 World Cup. He was never dismissed for a duck during his 105 ODI innings; no other retired player can boast this feat for a career longer than 50 innings.

=== Captaincy ===
During the 1989 Currie Cup final in Port Elizabeth, Wessels angered South African cricket authorities by letting his Eastern Province side bat deep into the third day, without declaring the first innings closed. He was accused of killing the game and ruining what was supposed to be the annual showpiece of South African cricket, by not giving his opponents, Transvaal, a fair chance at batting. However, the decision proved to be correct from an Eastern Province point of view, as the home side managed to bowl Transvaal out twice by the fifth day, thereby winning by an innings and 103 runs.

As captain of the national side, Wessels was similarly criticised for playing too conservatively in South Africa's first test series since readmission into international cricket. Although South Africa won the home series against India by 1–0, fans and critics sharpened their pencils and attacked the captain mercilessly for his team's apparent lack of passion and ambition. The fourth test in Cape Town, in particular, was condemned across the cricketing world. The two teams scored a total of 795 runs in 433.4 overs, at an average of only 1.83 runs per over and ended in a draw. Wessels commented on the criticism in his biography, saying: "It was almost as if they thought we should win every series 4–0. They simply don't understand that modern Test cricket is tough and competitive."

== Lawn bowls career ==
Since retiring he has taken up lawn bowls, playing for the Belgravia Bowls Club and has twice finished runner-up in the National Championships; in 2013 in the fours event and again in 2016 in the pairs event with Gerry Baker.

== See also ==
- List of cricketers who have played for more than one international team
