= Dick French =

Australian cricket umpire (born 1938)

Richard Allan French (born 7 August 1938 in Sydney) is an Australian Test cricket umpire.

He umpired in 19 Test matches between 1977 and 1987. His first match was between Australia and India at Perth on 16 December to 21 December 1977, won by Australia by 2 wickets with Tony Mann becoming the first Australian night-watchman to score a century, and the 41-year-old Bob Simpson scoring his 1st century for 10 years, having come out of retirement to lead an Australian team depleted by defections to World Series Cricket. His partner was Robin Bailhache.

French's last Test match was between Australia and New Zealand at Melbourne on 26 December to 30 December 1987. Richard Hadlee took 10 wickets for the match. French's colleague was Tony Crafter.

French also umpired 57 One Day International (ODI) matches between 1979 and 1988.

He umpired 68 first-class matches in his career between 1976 and 1988.

French is NSW State Director of Umpiring, and a current member of the Cricket Australia Umpire Selection Panel and its Technical Committee.

He attended Sydney Boys High School, graduating in 1953.

== See also ==
- List of Test cricket umpires
- List of One Day International cricket umpires
