= Joel Garner =

West Indian cricketer (born 1952)

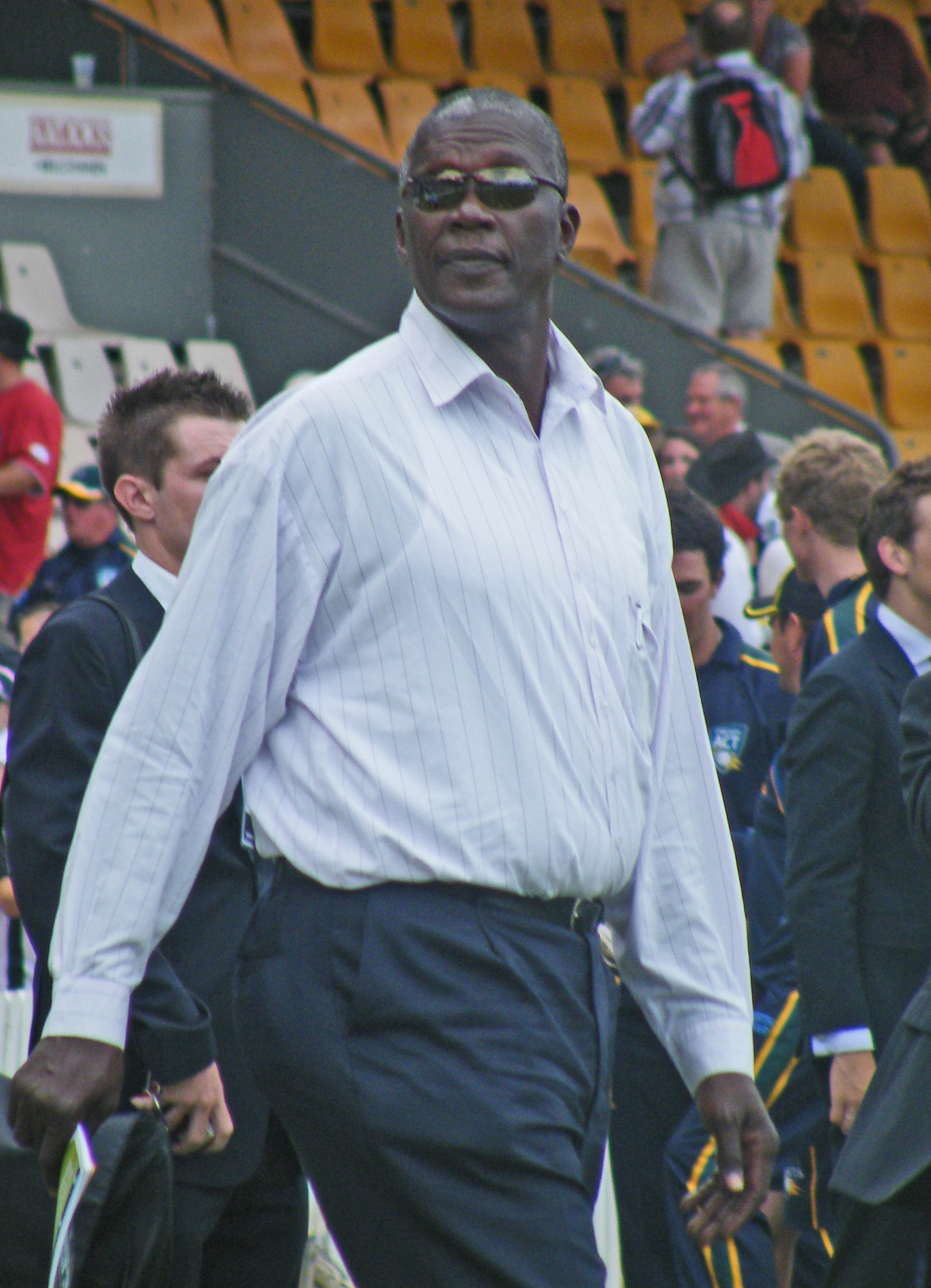

Personal information
- Born: 16 December 1952 (age 73); Christ Church, Barbados
- Nickname: Big Bird
- Height: 6 ft 8 in (2.03 m)
- Batting: Right-handed
- Bowling: Right arm fast

International information
- National side: West Indies (1977–1987)
- Test debut (cap 160): 18 February 1977 v Pakistan
- Last Test: 15 March 1987 v New Zealand
- ODI debut (cap 21): 16 March 1977 v Pakistan
- Last ODI: 28 March 1987 v New Zealand

Domestic team information
- Years: Team
- 1975–1987: Barbados
- 1977–1986: Somerset
- 1982/83: South Australia

Career statistics
Competition	Test	ODI	FC	LA
Matches	58	98	214	256
Runs scored	672	239	2,964	1,023
Batting average	12.44	9.19	16.74	11.75
100s/50s	0/1	0/0	1/8	0/1
Top score	60	37	104	59*
Balls bowled	13,169	5,330	39,829	13,359
Wickets	259	146	881	397
Bowling average	20.97	18.84	18.53	16.61
5 wickets in innings	7	3	48	10
10 wickets in match	0	0	7	0
Best bowling	6/56	5/31	8/31	6/29
Catches/stumpings	42/–	30/–	129/–	71/–
Medal record
Men's Cricket
Representing West Indies
ICC Cricket World Cup
Winner	1979 England
Runner-up	1983 England and Wales
- Source: Cricinfo, 13 September 2009

Joel Garner (born 16 December 1952) is a former West Indian cricketer, and a member of the highly regarded late 1970s and early 1980s West Indies cricket teams. Garner is the highest ranked One Day International bowler according to the ICC best-ever bowling ratings, and is 37th in Tests. Garner was a member of the West Indies teams that won their second world title in the 1979 Cricket World Cup, as well as finishing as runners-up at the 1983 Cricket World Cup.

In conjunction with fellow fast bowlers Michael Holding, Andy Roberts, Colin Croft, and later Malcolm Marshall and Courtney Walsh, the West Indies reached unprecedented heights in the Test and one-day cricket arenas, not losing a Test series in 15 years.

In 2010, Garner was inducted into the ICC Cricket Hall of Fame.

== Early life ==
Joel Garner was born in Enterprise, Christ Church, Barbados. Enterprise was a "scattering of houses among fields of sugar cane". Garner was the older of two boys. When he and his brother were very young, his parents migrated to Canada and the United States and they were left in the care of their grandparents. Cricket was popular and Garner played it as a child. He first attended St Christopher's boys primary school which was held in the local Anglican Church. He attended secondary school at Foundation Boys and played cricket for the school where he played as an all rounder. When selected for a school team coached by Seymour Nurse, He was told by Seymour Nurse "What's a big fellow like you doing batting or trying to bat? You're much too big to be a batsman...with your height, son, you should be bowling, fast". Seymour Nurse spent time coaching Garner on how to take full advantage of his height when bowling. He then attended coaching sessions organized by Charlie Griffith and Gary Sobers. Griffith taught Garner to bowl a yorker that swung in the air and how to use a bouncer effectively.

== Career ==
Garner first came to the attention of Somerset whilst playing for Littleborough in the Central Lancashire League. He replaced Sir Garry Sobers as the club's paid man for the 1976 season, continuing in the role for the 1977 and 1978 seasons. During his three-year stay at Littleborough he amassed over 1500 runs with the bat and took 334 wickets at 9.34 runs apiece.

Joel Garner signed for Somerset for the start of the 1977 season. Brian Rose, who captained Garner at Somerset thought that when Garner bowled, his bounce was "always too steep to drive, often to even play forward". He took 338 First Class wickets at an average of 18.10 during his time at Somerset and was considered the best fast bowler to play for the county. Garner said of Somerset “The people are relaxed and I found people friendlier here. They never hassled you, you could go about your business and I just fit in”.

He was at Somerset in the most successful time in the county's history in winning five trophies. In the 1979 Gillette Cup final at Lords, Garner took six wickets for 29 runs to help defeat Northamptonshire and in the 1981 Benson & Hedges Cup final at Lords, Garner took five wickets for 14 runs to help defeat Surrey.

Garner appeared in 58 test matches for the West Indies between 1977 and 1987 and took 259 wickets at an average of barely above 20, making him statistically one of the most effective bowlers of all time. He made his test debut against Pakistan in 1977 and took 25 wickets in his debut series.

Garner took seven five wicket bags in test cricket but never took ten wickets in a test match. As he shared the bowling duties with Michael Holding, Andy Roberts, Colin Croft, and later Malcolm Marshall, competition to take wickets was plentiful.

At 6 feet 8 inches (an inch taller than Jason Holder, who stands at 6 feet 7 inches), he was, at the time, the tallest fast bowler to play test cricket.

Garner was dropped for the final test of the Indian tour of the West Indies in 1983 and again for the West Indies tour of India later that year. Battling injuries, he spent the time building his fitness and returned for the 1983-84 one day series in Australia. Garner missed six one day games due to a knee injury but was able to return for the final few games where his form and fitness had returned. In the following Australian tour of the West Indies, Garner took 31 wickets in the test matches. He described himself as "probably the most happiest man on the team. Dropped from the side the previous season, called washed-up even by friends I hoped hadn't meant it, plagued by recurring injuries to knees and shoulder, I still bowled 208 overs in the tests".

However, it was in limited overs cricket that Garner put his height to use with devastating effect: in 98 matches he took 146 wickets. He had the ability to unleash a devastating yorker, as well as generate more bounce. As of January 2020, he is one of only two players with more than 100 ODI wickets at an average of under 20 runs per wicket, while his economy rate of 3.09 runs per over is the best ever for any bowler who bowled at least 1000 balls. He is the all-time highest ranked ODI bowler.

His 5 for 39 in the 1979 Cricket World Cup final against England remains the best ever performance by a bowler in a final; it included a spell of 5 wickets for 4 runs, and he was on a hat-trick twice.

He was also the part of the West Indian team which was runner-up in 1983 ICC Cricket World Cup. In the first league match with India, he, along with Sir Andy Roberts, set the highest ever 10th wicket partnership in World Cup history (71), but chasing 262, West Indies were reduced to 157-9 but Garner and Roberts added 71 runs to make 228 and West Indies lost by 34 runs.

Garner played for Barbados in the West Indies, for South Australia in the Sheffield Shield and alongside Viv Richards and Ian Botham for Somerset in the English County Championship.

In Barbados, his club team was YMPC. During his time playing for Barbados, he was captain in 1986. He revealed his tactics to Derek Pringle as “It’s quite simple. Me and Macko [Malcolm Marshall] open the bowling and nip out the top order. We have a rest and the other bowlers come on and keep it tight. Then me and Macko come on and blast out the tail. We have a bat, get a hundred lead and bowl them out again.”

Until the appearance of the 7-foot-1-inch (2.16 m) tall Pakistani fast bowler Mohammad Irfan in 2010, Garner, former Australian pace bowler Bruce Reid and Irish fast bowler Boyd Rankin were the equal-tallest players ever to play international cricket.

Geoff Boycott said of Joel Garner "They should cut Joel Garner off at the knees to make him bowl at a normal height".

== After retirement ==
In October 2010 Garner was named interim manager of the West Indies for the tour of Sri Lanka. He was one of the new faces in the team including captain Daren Sammy.

In the 2013 election he was the BCA candidate for vice-president of the West Indies Cricket Board, losing to Dave Cameron's running mate, Emmanuel Nanthan of Dominica, 8–4. As of 2016 he continues as Barbados Cricket Association president, spearheads West Indies' drive in Masters Cricket, has served as a West Indies selector, and fulfils various other duties.
