= 1988 NatWest Trophy =

- Administrator: Test and County Cricket Board
- Cricket format: Limited overs cricket (60 overs per innings)
- Tournament format: Knockout
- Champions: Middlesex (4th title)
- Participants: 32
- Matches: 31
- Most runs: 296 Graeme Hick (Worcestershire)
- Most wickets: 12 Angus Fraser (Middlesex)

The 1988 NatWest Trophy was the 8th NatWest Trophy. It was an English limited overs county cricket tournament which was held between 22 June and 3 September 1988. The tournament was won by Middlesex who defeated Worcestershire by 3 wickets in the final at Lord's.

== Format ==
The seventeen first-class counties, were joined by thirteen Minor Counties: Berkshire, Buckinghamshire, Cambridgeshire, Cheshire, Cumberland, Devon, Durham, Hertfordshire, Lincolnshire, Shropshire, Staffordshire, Suffolk and Wiltshire. The Ireland and Scotland teams also participated. Teams who won in the first round progressed to the second round. The winners in the second round then progressed to the quarter-final stage. Winners from the quarter-finals then progressed to the semi-finals from which the winners then went on to the final at Lord's which was held on 3 September 1988.

=== First round ===
22 June 1988
(scorecard)

Berkshire; 105 all out (57.1 overs)	v	Yorkshire; 109/0 (26.5 overs)
Mark Stear 23; Stuart Fletcher 3/20 (10.1 overs)		Ashley Metcalfe 74*

Yorkshire won by 10 runs
Memorial Ground, Finchampstead
Umpires: David Constant & Harold Rhodes
Player of the match: Stuart Fletcher (Yorkshire)

22 June 1988
(scorecard)

Northamptonshire; 161 all out (55.2 overs)	v	Cheshire; 163/9 (59.5 overs)
Geoff Cook 53*; John O'Brien 2/19 (8 overs)		Barry Wood 40; David Capel 2/28 (12 overs)

Cheshire won by 1 wicket
Boughton Hall Cricket Club Ground, Chester
Umpires: Jack Birkenshaw & Tommy Wilson
Player of the match: Barry Wood (Cheshire)

22 June 1988
(scorecard)

Nottinghamshire; 302/3 (60 overs)	v	Devon; 238/6 (60 overs)
Derek Randall 149*; Mark Woodman 1/39 (12 overs)		Paul Brown 67*; Franklyn Stephenson 2/24 (10 overs)

Nottinghamshire won by 64 runs
Recreation Ground, Torquay
Umpires: David Halfyard & Roy Palmer
Player of the match: Derek Randall (Nottinghamshire)

22 June 1988
(scorecard)

Somerset; 240/7 (60 overs)	v	Durham; 206/8 (60 overs)
Jon Hardy 100 (175); Ian Conn 3/34 (12 overs)		Lance Cairns 54 (43); Gary Palmer 3/24 (12 overs)

Somerset won by 34 runs
Feethams, Darlington
Umpires: Brian Harrison & Don Oslear
Player of the match: Jon Hardy (Somerset)

22 June 1988
(scorecard)

Essex; 386/5 (60 overs)	v	Dorset; 95 all out (41.3 overs)
Derek Pringle 80*; David Simpkins 2/33(12 overs)		Robert Savage 32; Geoff Miller 3/23 (8.3 overs)

Essex won by 291 runs
County Ground, Chelmsford
Umpires: Jack Bond & Barry Dudleston
Player of the match: Derek Pringle (Essex)

22 June 1988
(scorecard)

Ireland; 186 all out (59.5 overs)	v	Gloucestershire; 190/1 (39.4 overs)
Mark Cohen 66; Terry Alderman 5/34 (11.5 overs)		Andy Stovold 104*; Garfield Harrison 1/21 (5 overs)

Gloucestershire won by 9 wickets
The Royal & Sun Alliance County Ground, Bristol
Umpires: Derek Dennis & Alan Whitehead
Player of the match: Andy Stovold (Gloucestershire)

22 June 1988
(scorecard)

Buckinghamshire; 113 all out (56 overs)	v	Kent; 115/2 (40.2 overs)
Trevor Butler 44; Roy Pienaar 3/19 (12 overs)		Simon Hinks 64*; Stephen Burrow 1/16 (6.2 overs)

Kent won by 8 wickets
St Lawrence Ground, Canterbury
Umpires: Terry Spencer & Peter Wight
Player of the match: Roy Pienaar (Kent)

22 June 1988
(scorecard)

Lancashire; 305 all out (59.5 overs)	v	Lincolnshire; 147 all out (53 overs)
Neil Fairbrother 80*; Paul Butler 3/20 (2.5 overs)		Guy Franks 42; Wasim Akram 4/27 (12 overs)

Lancashire won by 158 runs
Old Trafford, Manchester
Umpires: Chris Balderstone & Barrie Meyer
Player of the match: Neil Fairbrother (Lancashire)

22 June 1988
(scorecard)

Leicestershire; 255/9 (60 overs)	v	Suffolk; 168/6 (60 overs)
David Gower 99; Mark Bailey 3/42 (12 overs)		Gordon Morgan 40; Chris Lewis 2/32 (12 overs)

Leicestershire won by 87 runs
Grace Road, Leicester
Umpires: Bob Duckett & Mervyn Kitchen
Player of the match: David Gower (Leicestershire)

22 June 1988
(scorecard)

Hertfordshire; 142/7 (60 overs)	v	Middlesex; 143/2 (24.5 overs)
Andrew Miller 44; Phil Tufnell 3/29 (12 overs)		Mike Gatting 80*; William Merry 2/33 (9 overs)

Middlesex won by 8 wickets
Lord's, London
Umpires: John Harris & Donald Thompsett
Player of the match: Phil Tufnell (Middlesex)

22 June 1988
(scorecard)

Hampshire; 294/5 (60 overs)	v	Shropshire; 208/7 (60 overs)
Chris Smith 117; Philip Wormald 2/85 (12 overs)		Bryan Jones 83; Chris Smith 2/24 (2 overs)

Hampshire won by 86 runs
St George's Cricket Ground, Telford
Umpires: Allan Jones & Kevin Lyons
Player of the match: Chris Smith (Hampshire)

22 June 1988
(scorecard)

Surrey; 285/9 (60 overs)	v	Staffordshire; 230/8 (45 overs)
Alec Stewart 54; David Blank 3/75 (12 overs)		David Banks 62*; Sylvester Clarke 4/27 (12 overs)

Surrey won by 55 runs
Ind Coope Ground, Burton upon Trent
Umpires: Dickie Bird & Basher Hassan
Player of the match: David Banks (Staffordshire)

22 June 1988
(scorecard)

Sussex; 134 all out (46.1 overs)	v	Derbyshire; 135/4 (29.1 overs)
Tony Pigott 53; Michael Holding 8/21 (10.1 overs)		Kim Barnett 49; Colin Wells 1/19 (6 overs)

Derbyshire won by 6 wickets
County Ground, Hove
Umpires: Peter Eele & Bob White
Player of the match: Michael Holding (Derbyshire)

22 June 1988
(scorecard)

Warwickshire; 240/8 (60 overs)	v	Cambridgeshire; 173/6 (60 overs)
Andy Lloyd 121; Adrian Wykes 3/36 (12 overs)		Mike Garnham 110; Paul Smith 2/54 (12 overs)

Warwickshire won by 67 runs
Edgbaston, Birmingham
Umpires: John Holder & Nigel Plews
Player of the match: Mike Garnham (Cambridgeshire)

22 June 1988
(scorecard)

Worcestershire; 336/5 (60 overs)	v	Cumberland; 228/8 (60 overs)
Graeme Hick 138; David Halliwell 3/58 (12 overs)		Christopher Stockdale 51; Graeme Hick 2/37 (12 overs)

Worcestershire won by 299 runs
New Road, Worcester
Umpires: Sam Cook & John Hampshire
Player of the match: Graeme Hick (Worcestershire)

22 June 1988
(scorecard)

Glamorgan; 179 all out (59.2 overs)	v	Scotland; 94 all out (45.2 overs)
Alan Butcher 47; Clive Rice 4/29 (12 overs)		Gordon McGurk 36; Ravi Shastri 5/13 (11 overs)

Glamorgan won by 85 runs
Myreside, Edinburgh
Umpires: Barrie Leadbeater & Jack van Geloven
Player of the match: Ravi Shastri (Glamorgan)

=== Second round ===
6, 7, 8 July 1988
(scorecard)

Derbyshire; 190 all out (58.4 overs)	v	Cheshire; 103 all out (48.5 overs)
Bruce Roberts 57; Andrew Fox 4/24 (10.4 overs)		Mudassar Nazar 32; Ole Mortensen 5/15 (12 overs)

Derbyshire won by 87 runs
Boughton Hall Cricket Club Ground, Chester
Umpires: Mervyn Kitchen & David Shepherd
Player of the match: Ole Mortensen (Derbyshire)

- Match was scheduled for one day but extended to three.

6, 7 July 1988
(scorecard)

Essex; 141 all out (45 overs)	v	Surrey; 142/7 (48.5 overs)
Graham Gooch 71; Sylvester Clarke 3/29 (9 overs)		Alec Stewart 31; Neil Foster 3/51 (12 overs)

Surrey won by 3 wickets
County Ground, Chelmsford
Umpires: Ken Palmer & Peter Wight
Player of the match: Graham Gooch (Essex)

- Match was scheduled for one day but extended to two.

6, 7 July 1988
(scorecard)

Glamorgan; 246/5 (60 overs)	v	Lancashire; 215 all out (57.5 overs)
Alan Butcher 80; Paul Allott 1/21 (9 overs)		Andy Hayhurst 38*; John Derrick 4/57 (12 overs)

Glamorgan won by 31 runs
Sophia Gardens, Cardiff
Umpires: John Harris & Bob White
Player of the match: Alan Butcher (Glamorgan)

- Match was scheduled for one day but extended to two.

6 July 1988
(scorecard)

Somerset; 227/7 (60 overs)	v	Hampshire; 229/5 (59 overs)
Ricky Bartlett 85; Jon Ayling 2/25 (12 overs)		Chris Smith 99*; Graham Rose 2/46 (12 overs)

Hampshire won by 5 wickets
County Ground, Southampton
Umpires: Jack Bond & Ray Julian
Player of the match: Chris Smith (Hampshire)

6 July 1988
(scorecard)

Warwickshire; 144 all out (55.3 overs)	v	Kent; 148/3 (48.4 overs)
Andy Lloyd 38; Chris Penn 3/30 (12 overs)		Roy Pienaar 58*; Tony Merrick 2/36 (12 overs)

Kent won by 7 wickets
St Lawrence Ground, Canterbury
Umpires: Allan Jones & Barrie Leadbeater
Player of the match: Roy Pienaar (Kent)

6, 7 July 1988
(scorecard)

Gloucestershire; 273/5 (60 overs)	v	Leicestershire; 200 all out (47.2 overs)
Phil Bainbridge 89; Chris Lewis 2/54 (12 overs)		Chris Lewis 53; Kevin Curran 3/31 (7 overs)

Gloucestershire won by 73 runs
Grace Road, Leicester
Umpires: Don Oslear & Roy Palmer
Player of the match: Kevin Curran (Gloucestershire)

- Match was scheduled for one day but extended to two.

6, 7, 8 July 1988
(scorecard)

Worcestershire; 285/5 (60 overs)	v	Nottinghamshire; 74/3 (20.3 overs)
Tim Curtis 120; Kevin Saxelby 2/68 (12 overs)		Tim Robinson 30; Graham Dilley 1/16 (5 overs)

Worcestershire won on faster scoring rate
Trent Bridge, Nottingham
Umpires: Chris Balderstone & Barry Dudleston
Player of the match: Tim Curtis (Worcestershire)

- Match was scheduled for one day but extended to three.

6, 7, 8 July 1988
(scorecard)

Middlesex; 225/7 (60 overs)	v	Yorkshire; 188 all out (58 overs)
Mike Gatting 74; Christopher Shaw 4/29 (9 overs)		Jim Love 67; Angus Fraser 4/34 (12 overs)

Middlesex won by 37 runs
Headingley, Leeds
Umpires: Peter Eele & Barrie Meyer
Player of the match: Mike Gatting (Middlesex)

- Match was scheduled for one day but extended to three.

=== Quarter-finals ===
27 July 1988
(scorecard)

Derbyshire; 191 all out (59.5 overs)	v	Hampshire; 193/6 (57.2 overs)
Bernie Maher 44; Paul-Jan Bakker 2/36 (11.5 overs)		Paul Terry 67; Ole Mortensen 3/35 (10.2 overs)

Hampshire won by 5 wickets
County Ground, Derby
Umpires: Kevin Lyons & Nigel Plews
Player of the match: Paul Terry (Hampshire)

27 July 1988
(scorecard)

Kent; 195 all out (59.3 overs)	v	Middlesex; 199/5 (50.5 overs)
Chris Tavaré 49; Angus Fraser 2/20 (12 overs)		Roland Butcher 64; Chris Penn 2/25 (10 overs)

Middlesex won by 5 wickets
Lord's, London
Umpires: Ken Palmer & Alan Whitehead
Player of the match: Roland Butcher (Middlesex)

27 July 1988
(scorecard)

Glamorgan; 235/6 (60 overs)	v	Surrey; 236/6 (46.2 overs)
Matthew Maynard 64; Ian Greig 2/48 (12 overs)		Paul Atkins 82; Geoff Holmes 1/17 (5 overs)

Surrey won by 4 wickets
The Oval, London
Umpires: John Hampshire & John Holder
Player of the match: Paul Atkins (Surrey)

27 July 1988
(scorecard)

Gloucestershire; 185 all out (60 overs)	v	Worcestershire; 189/6 (57.5 overs)
Kevin Curran 53; Graham Dilley 3/30 (12 overs)		Phil Neale 45; David Graveney 2/23 (12 overs)

Worcestershire won by 4 wickets
New Road, Worcester
Umpires: David Constant & Ray Julian
Player of the match: Phil Neale (Worcestershire)

=== Semi-finals ===
10 August 1988
(scorecard)

Middlesex; 258/7 (60 overs)	v	Surrey; 188 all out (56.4 overs)
Roland Butcher 65; Sylvester Clarke 3/49 (12 overs)		Alec Stewart 107*; Norman Cowans 4/45 (12 overs)

Middlesex won by 70 runs
The Oval, London
Umpires: Jack Birkenshaw & Barrie Meyer
Player of the match: Roland Butcher (Middlesex)

10 August 1988
(scorecard)

Worcestershire; 268 all out (59.5 overs)	v	Hampshire; 239 all out (58.3 overs)
Tim Curtis 74; Paul-Jan Bakker 3/34 (11.5 overs)		Paul Terry 80; Graeme Hick 4/54 (11.3 overs)

Worcestershire won by 29 runs
New Road, Worcester
Umpires: John Hampshire & Alan Whitehead
Player of the match: Tim Curtis (Worcestershire)

=== Final ===
3 September 1988
(scorecard)

Worcestershire; 161/9 (60 overs)	v	Middlesex; 162/7 (55.3 overs)
Phil Neale 64 (143); Simon Hughes 4/30 (8 overs)		Mark Ramprakash 56 (123); Graham Dilley 5/29 (12 overs)

Middlesex won by 3 wickets
Lord's, London
Umpires: Dickie Bird & David Shepherd
Player of the match: Mark Ramprakash (Middlesex)
