= Jon Hardy =

Kenyan-born English cricketer (born 1960)

Personal information
- Full name: Jonathan James Ean Hardy
- Born: 2 October 1960 (age 66); Nakuru, Kenya Colony
- Batting: Left-handed

Domestic team information
- Years: Team
- 1983–1985: Hampshire
- 1986–1990: Somerset
- 1987/88–1990/91: Western Province
- 1987/88–1990/91: Western Province B
- 1991: Gloucestershire
- 1992–1999: Dorset

Career statistics
Competition	First-class	List A
Matches	142	139
Runs scored	6,120	2,798
Batting average	29.85	24.76
100s/50s	4/36	2/13
Top score	119	109
Catches/stumpings	80/–	36/–
- Source: Cricinfo, 9 December 2009

Jonathan James Ean Hardy (born 2 October 1960) is a Kenyan born former English cricketer. A left-handed batsman, Hardy played first-class and one-day cricket in England for Hampshire, Somerset, and Gloucestershire, as well as in South Africa for Western Province. He later played minor counties cricket for Dorset. In a career that spanned from 1983 to 1999, Hardy made around 140 appearances in both first-class and one-day cricket, scoring 6,120 and 2,798 runs in each respectively. He is the founder of the cricket helmet manufacturer Masuri, one of the leading providers of helmets to international cricketers.

== Cricket career ==
=== Hampshire ===
Jonathan James Ean Hardy was born on 2 October 1960 in Nakuru in Kenya Colony. He spent the first thirteen years of his life in Kenya, before coming to England to attend Canford School. He joined the staff at Hampshire in 1980 and made his senior debut three years later in a List A one-day match against Leicestershire in the 1983 John Player Special League. His first-class debut came the following season against Cambridge University at Fenner's. He established himself in the team in 1984, making 12 appearances in the County Championship and ten in one-day cricket. He scored 513 runs at an average of 36.64 in the Championship, with four half-centuries, including an unbeaten 94 runs on his Championship debut against Somerset. In one-day cricket, he scored 140 runs at an average of exactly 20, making one fifty. Following the season, Derbyshire attempted to sign Hardy, but he decided to stay at Hampshire for the 1985 season.

The following season, he made 16 first-class appearances, with 14 in the County Championship; he scored 742 runs at an average of 35.33, and made his maiden first-class century, an unbeaten 107 runs, against Essex. He struggled for form in his ten one-day appearances in 1985, scoring 52 runs at an average of exactly 13. In a period where the Hampshire batting line up was considered one of the strongest in the county's history, Hardy faced competition for a place in the team from Gordon Greenidge, Trevor Jesty, Tony Middleton, Mark Nicholas, Chris and Robin Smith, Paul Terry, and David Turner; it was to Turner that lost his place in the one-day side to. Seeking regular first team cricket, Hardy left Hampshire at the end of the season and joined Somerset on a two-year contract, having rejected an approach from Sussex. When at Hampshire, he played club cricket for Lymington in the New Forest.

=== Somerset ===
At the beginning of his contract with Somerset, their chairman Brian Langford considered Hardy to be a potential future captain of the county. In the 1986 season, he made 19 first-class and 15 one-day appearances. He scored 863 runs at an average of 29.75 in first-class cricket, making eight fifties. In one-day cricket, he scored 213 runs at an average of 15.21, making one half-century. The following year he passed a thousand runs in a season for the only time in his career, scoring 1,089 runs at an average of 28.65; alongside seven half-centuries, he made one century (119 runs) against Gloucestershire. In one-day cricket, his 22 appearances yielded him 557 runs at an average of 32.76, with his highest score being an unbeaten 94 runs against Essex in the Refuge Assurance League. Hardy was awarded his county cap by Somerset at the end of the season. He coached in South Africa during the winter, as he had one in previous seasons. There, he played representative cricket for Western Province (and their "B" team), debuting for them in a one-day match against Border in the 1986-87 Nissan Shield. He made five first-class appearances in the 1986–87 season, scoring 255 runs at an average of 28.33, making one half-century. He also made 12 one-day appearances, scoring 254 runs at an average of 31.75, with one fifty.

Hardy made 22 first-class appearances in the 1988 season, scoring 927 runs at an average of 25.75, making six fifties. He made 97 runs opening the batting against Yorkshire in the County Championship in August, an innings which lasted for three and a half hours. In one-day cricket, he made 486 runs at an average of 28.58; he scored his maiden one-day century against minor county Durham in the first round of the NatWest Trophy, making 100 runs from 72 balls to earn him man-of-the-match. Hardy spent the winter coaching in South Africa, making one first-class for Western Province B and 15 one-day appearances for the Western Province first team; in one-day cricket, he scored 263 runs at an average of 18.78, making one fifty. He made 13 appearances in the 1989 County Championship, scoring 435 runs at an average of 22.89, making two half-centuries. In one-day cricket he made only six appearances, scoring 33 runs. His poor form saw him dropped from the side in July, being replaced by Ricky Bartlett.

Despite the International Cricket Conference imposing a three-year international ban on players that participated in cricket in South Africa in response to the apartheid system there, Hardy returned to South Africa following the 1989 season, with the ban having no impact on him as a non-international player. There, he made eight first-class and three one-day appearances for Western Province. He had his most successful season in first-class cricket in South Africa, scoring 550 runs at an average of 61.11; he scored two centuries, making an unbeaten 102 against Griqualand West and 119 against Transvaal. Hardy made nine first-class appearances in the 1990 season, scoring 361 runs at an average of 32.81, making one half-century. In one-day cricket, he made two appearances; against Derbyshire he made 109 runs in Somerset's total of 310 for 3 in the Benson & Hedges Cup. He had started the season well, but a persisent back injury and a loss of form led him to be dropped from the side in June, with Somerset releasing him in August alongside Jon Atkinson and Trevor Gard.

=== Gloucestershire and Dorset ===
A month after his release, Hardy signed a two-year contract with Gloucestershire. He spent the winter in South Africa, playing two first-class and nine one-day matches, scoring 120 runs at an average of 13.33 in the latter. Prior to the 1991 season, Hardy injured his knee and underwent microsurgery, recovering by April. During the season, he made ten appearances in the 1991 County Championship and 12 one-day appearances. In the Championship, he scored 242 runs at an average of 18.61, making one fifty, whilst in one-day cricket he scored 270 runs at an average of exactly 27, making two half-centuries. A wrist injury sustained toward the end of the season forced him to retire professional cricket in February 1992. After retiring, Hardy coached at Canford School, rejoined Lymington, and represented the Hampshire Cricket Association in minor matches early in the 1992 season. He began playing minor counties cricket for Dorset in 1992, making nine appearances in the Minor Counties Championship, scoring 331 runs and making one century. He also played for Dorset in their NatWest Trophy defeat to Hampshire. In nine Minor Counties Championship matches in 1993, he averaged 42.84, and played in Dorset's ten wickets defeat to Surrey at The Oval in the first round of the NatWest Trophy; Hardy top-scored in Dorset's innings with 73 runs.

After Hardy's batting average dropped to 20.88 in the 1994 Minor Counties Championship, it recovered the following season, with Hardy averaging 49.50. He played in Dorset's first round defeat to Glamorgan in the 1995 NatWest Trophy, scoring an unbeaten 90 runs in their total of 191 for 4. Hardy was appointed Dorset captain prior to the 1996 season. He scored his second minor counties century in 1996, making 107 runs against Berkshire, and scored 560 runs at an average of 37.33 from nine Minor Counties Championship matches in 1996. In seven matches in 1997, he scored 471 runs at an average of 42.81 with one century. During the season, he had been accused of "bad sportsmanship" by Devon captain Peter Roebuck, who claimed Hardy had renaged on an agreement for Dorset to bowl "poorly" to allow Devon to set a competitive total in a rain-affected match. The following season, he scored 693 runs at an average of 53.30 from nine matches, making two centuries. He played his final NatWest Trophy match in 1998 in Dorset's first round defeat to Hampshire. In the Minor Counties Championship in 1999, he made 200 runs at an average of 28.57 from seven matches. He retired at the end of the season, including from club cricket.

=== Playing style and statistics ===
A tall, hard-hitting left-handed batsman, Hardy made 142 first-class and 139 one-day appearances. In first-class cricket, he scored 6,120 runs at an average of 29.85, making four centuries and 36 half-centuries. He scored over 1,000 first-class runs for both Hampshire and Somerset. In 25 matches for the former, he scored 1,255 runs at an average of 35.85, while for the latter he scored 3,675 runs at an average of 27.63 from 87 matches, making 24 half-centuries and one century. In one-day cricket, he scored 2,798 runs at an average of 24.76, making centuries and 13 half-centuries. He played the majority of his one-day games for Somerset (63) and Western Province (39). For the former, he scored 1,417 runs at an average of 25.30, making two centuries and six half-centuries. Across both formats, he took 116 catches. He made 62 appearances in the Minor Counties Championship for Dorset, scoring 3,493 runs at an average of 38.38, making five centuries and 18 fifties. He also made 13 appearances in the MCCA Knockout Trophy (the minor counties one-day competition), scoring 558 runs at an average of 55.80, making one century and four half-centuries.

== Business career ==
Hardy founded the cricket helmet manufacturer Masuri in Cape Town in 1987, with his helmet designs becoming the leading standard for international cricketers. By the late 1990s, he was in partnership with Robin Smith.
