= Nick Falkner =

English cricketer (born 1962)

Personal information
- Full name: Nicholas James Falkner
- Born: 30 September 1962 (age 64); Redhill, Surrey, England
- Batting: Right-handed
- Bowling: Right-arm medium

Domestic team information
- Years: Team
- 1988–1989: Sussex
- 1984–1987: Surrey

Career statistics
Competition	First-class	List A
Matches	26	19
Runs scored	1,042	287
Batting average	26.71	16.88
100s/50s	2/3	–/2
Top score	102	58
Balls bowled	24	–
Wickets	1	–
Bowling average	9.00	–
5 wickets in innings	–	–
10 wickets in match	–	–
Best bowling	1/3	–
Catches/stumpings	14/–	4/–
- Source: Cricinfo, 30 September 2012

Nicholas James Falkner (born 30 September 1962) is a former English cricketer. Falkner was a right-handed batsman who bowled right-arm medium pace. He was born at Redhill, Surrey, and was educated at Reigate Grammar School.

== Surrey ==
Falkner made his debut for Surrey against Glamorgan in a List A match in the 1984 John Player Special League, with him making a further List A appearance against Gloucestershire in that seasons Benson & Hedges Cup. In that same season he also made his first-class debut against Cambridge University, scoring a century on debut with a score of 101 not out in Surrey's first-innings, in a partnership of 198 with fellow debutant Keith Medlycott. The following season, he made just one appearance for Surrey, in a List A match against Gloucestershire in the 1985 John Player Special League.

In the 1986 season, he broke into Surrey's starting eleven for the County Championship, making eleven first-class appearances that season. He scored 567 runs at an average of 35.43, with a high score of 102 against Middlesex. He made four List A appearances in that season, against the touring Indians, as well as two matches against Derbyshire and Nottinghamshire in the NatWest Trophy and a single match against Hampshire in the John Player Special League. In the 1987 season, which was to be his last with Surrey, he made just four first-class appearances, against the touring Pakistanis and three appearances in the County Championship against Derbyshire, Warwickshire and Essex. He also appeared in five List A matches in the 1987 Benson & Hedges Cup, as well as two more in the Refuge Assurance League. Falkner played a total of sixteen first-class matches for the county, scoring 734 runs at an average of 34.95, scoring two centuries and two half centuries. In List A cricket, he made thirteen appearances, scoring 254 runs at an average of 23.09, with a high score of 58, which was one of two half centuries he made in that format.

== Sussex ==
Having left Surrey, he joined Sussex for the 1988 season, making his debut for the county in a List A match against Essex in the 1988 Benson & Hedges Cup. He made two further List A appearances in that season, against Warwickshire and Northamptonshire in the Refuge Assurance League. His first-class debut for the county came against Yorkshire in the County Championship, with him making six further first-class appearances in that season, scoring 232 runs at an average of 16.57, with a high score of 58. The following season, he made two first-class appearances against Surrey and Warwickshire in the County Championship, as well as a third first-class appearance against Cambridge University. He also made three List A appearances, two in the Benson & Hedges Cup against Hampshire and Glamorgan, as well as one against Warwickshire in the Refuge Assurance League. Falkner played a total of ten first-class matches for Sussex, scoring 308 runs at an average of 17.11, making one half century score of 55. In List A cricket, he made six appearances, scoring 33 runs at an average of 5.50, with a high score of 15. He played some matches for the Sussex Second XI in 1990, but thereafter he was released by the county.
