= Tim Curtis =

English Test and County cricketer (born 1960)

Personal information
- Full name: Timothy Stephen Curtis
- Born: 15 January 1960 (age 66); Chislehurst, Kent, England
- Batting: Right-handed
- Bowling: Right-arm leg-break
- Role: Opening batsman

International information
- National side: England
- Test debut: 21 July 1988 v West Indies
- Last Test: 14 August 1989 v Australia

Domestic team information
- Years: Team
- 1979–1997: Worcestershire
- 1983: Cambridge University

Career statistics
Competition	Test	FC	LA
Matches	5	339	304
Runs scored	140	20,832	10,280
Batting average	15.55	40.68	39.69
100s/50s	0/0	43/103	6/83
Top score	41	248	136*
Balls bowled	18	1,133	38
Wickets	0	14	2
Bowling average	–	58.07	17.50
5 wickets in innings	–	0	0
10 wickets in match	–	0	0
Best bowling	–	2/17	1/6
Catches/stumpings	3/–	192/–	93/–
- Source: CricketArchive, 23 December 2010

Timothy Stephen Curtis (born 15 January 1960) is a former England cricketer, English teacher and Director of Sport at RGS Worcester. He retired from teaching in 2016.

A right-handed batsman born at Chislehurst in Kent, Curtis was a prolific scorer for Worcestershire and county captain between 1992 and 1995. He is one of only two players to score 10,000 one day runs for the county, and during the late 1980s he had a brief international career.

As cricket correspondent, Colin Bateman, stated Curtis was "a diligent, determined opener... brought in to stop the rot against the 1988 West Indians with about as much success as those who had gone before him".

== Life and career ==
Curtis moved to Worcestershire in the 1960s to live in Malvern, where he attended The Grove county primary school. He entered the Royal Grammar School Worcester, where he became captain of rugby and cricket and Head Boy of the school. He moved on to Durham University (Hatfield College) in 1979, where he captained the university cricket team. That year also saw his debut in first-class cricket. Curtis also played rugby alongside cricket at university and represented Durham University RFC as a fullback in the University Athletic Union (UAU) final against Exeter University, which Durham won 6–3. In most rugby matches he played at university his name was listed in the programme as 'A. N. Other' – this subterfuge was the result of Curtis being contracted to play county cricket for Worcestershire, and he did not think they would approve of him risking injuries by playing rugby in the closed season.

In 1983, Curtis went to Magdalene College, Cambridge and gained a blue for cricket. After returning to Worcester to teach English at the Royal Grammar School, he played cricket for Worcestershire. Curtis is the only man, other than Graeme Hick, to have scored more than 10,000 runs in List A cricket for Worcestershire. In 1988, he was selected for England and played in a total of five Test matches against Australia and West Indies as an opening batsman. However, his international career was unsuccessful, and he never reached fifty in a Test innings. He had more success at this time with Worcestershire, helping them to win the County Championship in 1988 and 1989, the Refuge Assurance League in 1987 and 1988, and the Benson & Hedges Cup and Refuge Assurance Cup in 1991.

In 1992, Curtis was appointed captain of Worcestershire, leading the county to success in the 1994 NatWest Trophy. He retired from first-class cricket in 1996 and continues to write about, and coach, cricket.

In 1994, he along with Tom Moody set the record for the highest ever partnership for the 3rd wicket in List A cricket history (309*).

Curtis had a spell as chairman of the Professional Cricketers' Association.

Sporting positions
Preceded by Phil Neale	Worcestershire County Cricket Captain; 1992–1995	Succeeded by Tom Moody
