= Steve O'Shaughnessy (cricketer) =

English cricketer and umpire

Steven O'Shaughnessy
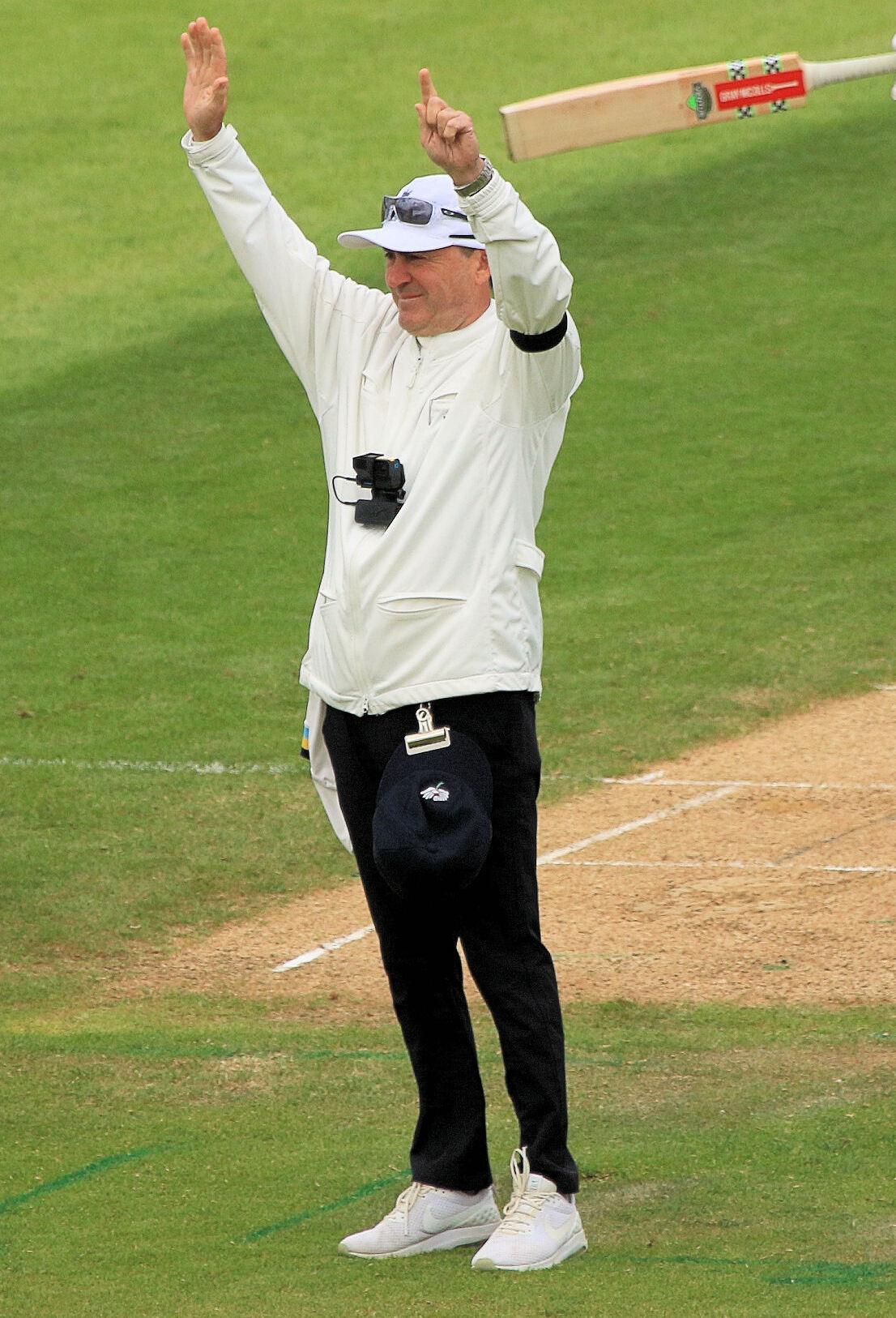
- O'Shaughnessy in 2025

Personal information
- Full name: Steven Joseph O'Shaughnessy
- Born: 9 September 1961 (age 65); Bury, Greater Manchester, England
- Batting: Right-handed
- Bowling: Right arm medium
- Role: Umpire

Domestic team information
- Years: Team
- 1980–1987: Lancashire
- 1988–1989: Worcestershire
- 1990: Northumberland
- 1994–2003: Cumberland

Umpiring information
- WODIs umpired: 8 (2012–2018)
- WT20Is umpired: 2 (2010–2022)

Career statistics
Competition	FC	LA
Matches	112	177
Runs scored	3,720	2,999
Batting average	24.31	23.42
100s/50s	5/16	1/15
Top score	159*	101*
Balls bowled	7,179	5,389
Wickets	114	115
Bowling average	36.03	36.38
5 wickets in innings	0	0
10 wickets in match	0	0
Best bowling	4/66	4/17
Catches/stumpings	57/–	44/–
- Source: CricInfo, 19 October 2008

Steven Joseph O'Shaughnessy (born 9 September 1961) is a former English professional cricketer who played for Lancashire and Worcestershire in the 1980s, and then had a substantial career in Minor Counties cricket with Cumberland. Since retiring from playing, he has become an umpire, and was promoted in December 2010 to the first-class panel for the 2011 season.

== Life and career ==
Born in Bury, Greater Manchester, O'Shaughnessy was selected for the England Young Cricketers tour of the West Indies in 1979–80, playing in all three Youth Tests. He was successful with the bat, hitting 130 from number eight in the second match at Castries and then, higher up the order, 81 and 93 in the third game at Bridgetown. He was also to play for the Young Cricketers against their Indian counterparts in 1981, but with less success.

O'Shaughnessy made his List A debut on 1 June 1980, in a John Player League for Lancashire against Warwickshire at Aigburth, though his contribution was minimal as he was dismissed for one and neither bowled nor held a catch. His first-class debut was just three days later, against Oxford University at The University Parks where he made an unbeaten 50 and took two catches in a ten-wicket victory. He took 3–23 in a John Player League match against Hampshire in late July, and ended the summer with seven List A wickets, but his only first-class victim of the season was Yorkshire opener Richard Lumb in late August.

From 1981 until 1987, O'Shaughnessy played fairly regularly in the Lancashire team. He made two of his five first-class centuries in 1983 (100* versus Yorkshire and a contrived 105 against Leicestershire, of which more below), but it was 1984 which proved to be his best year with the bat. He passed a thousand first-class runs for the only summer of his career, hitting 1,167 at 34.32, including the other three centuries, the highest – and his career-best – being 159* against Somerset at Bath. 1984 also saw his only List A hundred, 101* against Leicestershire in August, and in this year he also helped Lancashire win the Benson & Hedges Cup, taking 2 wickets and scoring 22 in the final. As a bowler, his highest season's aggregates were 27 in 1982 for first-class cricket and 26 in 1984 for the one-day game. His career-best returns were 4–66 against Nottinghamshire in the County Championship in 1982, and 4–17 against Leicestershire in the 1985 Benson & Hedges Cup.

An unusual incident occurred on 13 September 1983, the last day of the 1983 County Championship season. Lancashire were playing Leicestershire, and rain had delayed the start of play by a day and a half. On the final afternoon, facing an attack consisting of David Gower (9–0–102–0) and James Whitaker (8–1–87–0), Lancashire openers Graeme Fowler and O'Shaughnessy both scored centuries: Fowler's in 46 minutes and O'Shaughnessy's in 35. This performance won O'Shaughnessy the Walter Lawrence Trophy for the fastest century of the season, despite its contrived circumstances, and equalled Percy Fender's 1920 record. Fender himself, by then 91 years old and blind, sent O'Shaughnessy a telegram: "Congratulations on equalling my 63-year-old record. Fender" and the two men met a few days later at Fender's home in Horsham.

O'Shaughnessy received his Lancashire cap in 1985, but he had a disastrous summer in first-class cricket. In 23 innings he passed 50 only once, and his average was barely 13. He did better in one-day cricket, averaging over 29, but (the aforementioned 4–17 notwithstanding) the wickets were starting to dry up: he would only ever take two wickets in a List A innings once more. The next two seasons were rather better so far as batting was concerned, though his bowling fell away further: he took just 12 first-class wickets in the two seasons combined, averaging 72 and 50 in 1986 and 1987 respectively.

In 1988, O'Shaughnessy moved to Worcestershire, and his career with his new employer began promisingly with 50 against his old county in the Refuge Assurance League at Old Trafford. He followed it up with 44 in the Championship against Nottinghamshire at Worcester. However, it proved to be a false dawn. That 44 remained his highest first-class score for Worcestershire, and although he did strike 62 versus Hampshire in the NatWest Trophy semi-final, he failed badly with the rest of the top order in the final, being dismissed for one run. In other respects however it was a more successful year for Worcestershire as they won the 1988 County Championship and the 1988 Refuge Assurance League. O'Shaughnessy contributed more to the latter triumph, top-scoring in the fixture where Worcestershire clinched the title with 43 not out.

By 1989, O'Shaughnessy was spending considerable amounts of time in the Second XI, and made only one first-class appearance (against the touring Australians), and although he played in 12 List A games he enjoyed little success. After the Refuge Assurance League game against Kent at the end of July, O'Shaughnessy would not be seen again in a Worcestershire shirt, nor indeed in first-class cricket.

Although no longer involved in county cricket at the highest level, he continued to play Minor Counties cricket for a decade. As well as his numerous games for Cumberland (which gave him the occasional List A appearance in the NatWest Trophy) he turned out on one occasion in 1990 for Northumberland. He also played in Australia for the Australian Capital Territory on a few occasions in the early 1990s, played for Werneth in the Central Lancashire League 1994 and in 2003 and 2004 played club cricket for Alderley Edge Cricket Club. O'Shaughnessy's final List A appearance came for Cumberland against Scotland in the C&G Trophy in August 2003. He scored 8, and thus missed by just one run the chance to have scored 3,000 List A runs in his career.
