= 1991 Benson & Hedges Cup =

- Administrator(s): Test and County Cricket Board
- Cricket format: Limited overs cricket (55 overs per innings)
- Champions: Worcestershire (1st title)
- Participants: 20
- Matches: 47
- Most runs: 413 Chris Smith (Hampshire)
- Most wickets: 16 Neal Radford (Worcestershire)

The 1991 Benson & Hedges Cup was the twentieth edition of cricket's Benson & Hedges Cup.

The competition was won by Worcestershire County Cricket Club.

== Fixtures and results ==
=== Group stage ===
==== Group A ====
Team	Pld	W	L	NR	A	Pts	Rp100
Worcestershire	4	3	1	0	0	6	64.675
Northamptonshire	4	3	1	0	0	6	63.578
Derbyshire	4	2	2	0	0	4	71.061
Gloucestershire	4	2	2	0	0	4	56.608
Combined Universities	4	0	4	0	0	0	43.712

==== Group B ====
Team	Pld	W	L	NR	A	Pts	Rp100
Essex	4	4	0	0	0	8	79.744
Warwickshire	4	3	1	0	0	6	77.197
Somerset	4	1	3	0	0	2	68.550
Surrey	4	1	3	0	0	2	65.909
Middlesex	4	1	3	0	0	2	59.794

==== Group C ====
Team	Pld	W	L	NR	A	Pts	Rp100
Lancashire	4	4	0	0	0	8	74.135
Kent	4	3	1	0	0	6	76.252
Sussex	4	2	2	0	0	4	69.242
Leicestershire	4	1	3	0	0	2	64.318
Scotland	4	0	4	0	0	0	58.485

==== Group D ====
Team	Pld	W	L	NR	A	Pts	Rp100
Yorkshire	4	3	1	0	0	6	70.173
Hampshire	4	3	1	0	0	6	64.236
Nottinghamshire	4	2	2	0	0	4	76.140
Glamorgan	4	2	2	0	0	4	70.985
Minor Counties	4	0	4	0	0	0	63.636

=== Quarter-finals ===
29 May 1991
(scorecard)

Essex; 223 all out (55 overs)	v	Hampshire; 191 all out (53.5 overs)
Nadeem Shahid 42; Shaun Udal 3/41 (11 overs)		Chris Smith 71; Don Topley 4/41 (10 overs)

Essex won by 32 runs
County Ground, Chelmsford
Umpires: Mervyn Kitchen & Bob White
Player of the match: Don Topley (Essex)

29 May 1991
(scorecard)

Northamptonshire; 246/8 (55 overs)	v	Lancashire; 247/3 (52.4 overs)
Rob Bailey 75; Wasim Akram 3/57 (11 overs)		Gehan Mendis 125*; Greg Thomas 2/54 (11 overs)

Lancashire won by 7 wickets
Old Trafford, Manchester
Umpires: Dickie Bird & Nigel Plews
Player of the match: Gehan Mendis (Lancashire)

29 May 1991
(scorecard)

Worcestershire; 308/5 (55 overs)	v	Kent; 281/9 (55 overs)
Tom Moody 100; Alan Igglesden 2/85 (11 overs)		Neil Taylor 89*; Richard Illingworth 2/50 (11 overs)

Worcestershire won by 27 runs
New Road, Worcester
Umpires: Jack Bond & John Harris
Player of the match: Tom Moody (Worcestershire)

29 May 1991
(scorecard)

Yorkshire; 233/6 (55 overs)	v	Warwickshire; 111 all out (42 overs)
David Byas 58; Allan Donald 3/46 (11 overs)		Andy Lloyd 24; Martyn Moxon 5/31 (8 overs)

Yorkshire won by 122 runs
Headingley Cricket Ground, Leeds
Umpires: Chris Balderstone & Barrie Meyer
Player of the match: Martyn Moxon (Yorkshire)

=== Semi-finals ===
12 June 1991
(scorecard)

Essex; 104 all out (34.5 overs)	v	Worcestershire; 110/1 (31.1 overs)
Nasser Hussain 26; Ian Botham 3/11 (11 overs)		Tom Moody 72*

Worcestershire won by 9 wickets
County Ground, Chelmsford
Umpires: David Constant & Barrie Leadbeater
Player of the match: Ian Botham (Worcestershire)

12 June 1991
(scorecard)

Lancashire; 268 all out (54 overs)	v	Yorkshire; 200 all out (49.4 overs)
Gehan Mendis 75; Stuart Fletcher 4/51 (10 overs)		Ashley Metcalfe 114; Mike Watkinson 5/49 (10.4 overs)

Lancashire won by 68 runs
Old Trafford, Manchester
Umpires: Kevin Lyons & Alan Whitehead
Player of the match: Ashley Metcalfe (Yorkshire)

=== Final ===
13, 14 July 1991
(scorecard)

Worcestershire; 236/8 (55 overs)	v	Lancashire; 171 all out (47.2 overs)
Graeme Hick 88; Wasim Akram 3/58 (11 overs)		Graeme Fowler 54; Neal Radford 3/48 (9 overs)

Worcestershire won by 65 runs
Lord's, London
Umpires: John Holder & David Shepherd
Player of the match: Graeme Hick (Worcestershire)

- Reserve day used. Lancashire were 55/3 at the close of the first day's play.

== See also ==
- Benson & Hedges Cup
