= Andrew Fox =

Andrew or Andy Fox may refer to:

- Andrew F. Fox (1849–1926), U.S. congressman from Mississippi
- Andrew Fox (author) (born 1952), American author
- Andrew Fox (cricketer) (born 1962), English cricketer
- Andy Fox (born 1971), baseball executive and former infielder and coach
- Andrew Fox (footballer) (born 1993), British footballer
- Andy Fox, a member of the FoxTrot family featured in a comic strip
