= Ian Conn =

English cricketer

Personal information
- Full name: Ian Edward Conn
- Born: 16 April 1962 (age 64); Sunderland, County Durham, England
- Batting: Right-handed
- Bowling: Right-arm medium

Domestic team information
- Years: Team
- 1989–1992: Minor Counties
- 1992–1996: Northumberland
- 1982–1991: Durham

Career statistics
Competition	List A
Matches	15
Runs scored	51
Batting average	6.37
100s/50s	–/–
Top score	23*
Balls bowled	884
Wickets	12
Bowling average	49.50
5 wickets in innings	–
10 wickets in match	–
Best bowling	3/27
Catches/stumpings	3/–
- Source: Cricinfo, 1 August 2011

Ian Edward Conn (born 16 April 1962) is a former English cricketer. Conn was a right-handed batsman who bowled right-arm medium pace. He was born in Sunderland, County Durham.

Conn made his Minor counties debut for Durham against Cumberland in the 1982 Minor Counties Championship. He played Minor counties cricket for Durham from 1982 to 1991, making 42 Minor Counties Championship appearances and 9 MCCA Knockout Trophy appearances. He made his List A debut for Durham against Warwickshire in the 1986 NatWest Trophy. He made 4 further List A appearances for the county, the last of which came against Middlesex in the 1989 NatWest Trophy. In his 4 one-day appearances for Durham, he took 5 wickets at an average of 31.40, with best figures of 3/34. While at Durham, he also played List A cricket for the Minor Counties cricket team in the 1989 and 1991 Benson & Hedges Cup's. Following Durham's elevation to first-class status at the end of the 1991 season, Conn's services were not retained by the county.

For the 1992 season, he joined Northumberland, making his debut for the county in the MCCA Knockout Trophy against Cheshire. He played Minor counties cricket for Northumberland from 1992 to 1996, making 29 Minor Counties Championship appearances and 7 MCCA Knockout Trophy appearances. He would go on to appear in 2 List A matches for Northumberland, against Yorkshire in the 1992 NatWest Trophy and Nottinghamshire in the 1994 NatWest Trophy. He also continued to appear for the Minor counties cricket team, playing 4 further matches for the team in the 1992 Benson & Hedges Cup. In total he played 9 matches for the team, taking 7 wickets at an average of 50.28, with best figures of 3/27.
