= Chris Penn (disambiguation) =

Chris Penn (1965–2006) was an American actor.

Chris or Christopher Penn may also refer to:

- Chris Penn (American football) (born 1971), former American football player
- Chris Penn (cricketer) (born 1963), former English cricketer
