= Stear =

Stear is a surname. Notable people with the surname include:

- John Stear (fl. 2010s), member of Australian Skeptics
- Mark Stear (born 1958), English cricketer
- Michael Stear (1938–2020), Royal Air Force Air Marshal

== See also ==
- Stears
