= Boughton Hall Cricket Club Ground =

Cricket ground in Boughton, Cheshire, England

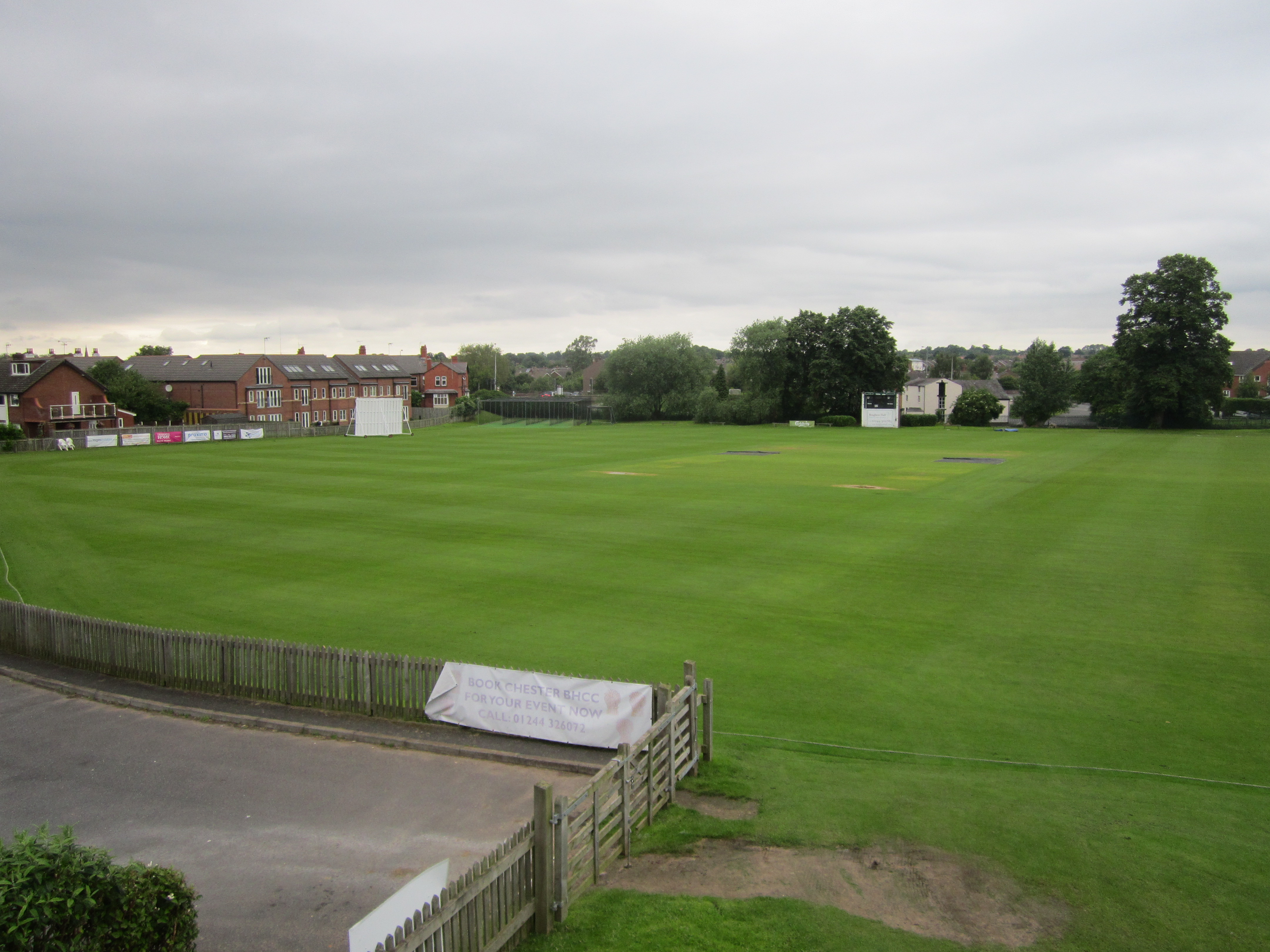
- Interactive map of Boughton Hall Cricket Club Ground

Ground information
- Location: Boughton, Cheshire
- Country: England
- Coordinates: 53.1911°N 2.8596°W
- Establishment: 1886 (first recorded match)

Team information
| Minor Counties North | (1972) |
| Cheshire | (1910–present) |
- As of 10 July 2012; Source: Ground profile

Boughton Hall Cricket Club Ground is a cricket ground in Boughton, Cheshire. The ground is located in grounds which formerly belonged to Boughton Hall. The ground is located off Boughton Hall Avenue, with the Shropshire Union Canal to the north. The ground is used by Chester Boughton Hall Cricket Club.

== History ==
The first recorded match held on the ground was in 1886, when Boughton Hall played Huyton. Cheshire first used the ground in 1910 when they played Northumberland in the Minor Counties Championship. Prior to and after World War I, Cheshire played a match annually at the ground, until World War II. Following the war Cheshire returned to the ground in 1951, however this would be their last match there until 1970. In 1972, the ground was selected as a home venue for Minor Counties North in the 1972 Benson & Hedges Cup, where the team played a single List A match against Lancashire. From 1970 to 1988, the ground held one Minor Counties Championship match annually.

Cheshire played their first List A match at the venue in the first round of the 1988 NatWest Trophy, which saw them record a famous victory against first-class opponents Northamptonshire. However, Cheshire lost their second round match held at Boughton Hall against Derbyshire. The following season, Cheshire played a further List A match there against Hampshire in the 1989 NatWest Trophy, which ended in defeat. Cheshire played their first MCCA Knockout Trophy match there in 1992 against Northumberland, with Minor Counties Championship cricket returning there in 1993 when Dorset visited the ground. List A cricket returned to the ground in the 1995 NatWest Trophy when Essex defeated Cheshire, while in the 1998 NatWest Trophy the same opponents visited, with Essex once again triumphing. The ground was used infrequently by Cheshire in minor counties during the 1990s.

Cheshire's first match there in the 21st century came against Lincolnshire in a List A match in the 2000 NatWest Trophy, which Lincolnshire won. The ground held its final List A match in first round of the 2002 Cheltenham & Gloucester Trophy when Cheshire played the Lancashire Cricket Board, with the match held in 2001 to avoid fixture congestion in 2002. Cheshire won by 8 wickets. Cheshire played a total of seven List A matches at the ground, winning two and losing five. Minor counties cricket returned in 2003, with Cheshire playing a single Minor Counties Championship match annually since then. Three MCCA Knockout Trophy matches have been played there since 2007, all with Devon as the opposition.

== Records ==
=== List A ===
- Highest team total: 306/2 (60 overs) by Hampshire v Cheshire, 1989
- Lowest team total: 92 (36.5 overs) by Cheshire v Essex, 1998
- Highest individual innings: 159 by Chris Smith for Hampshire v Cheshire, 1989
- Best bowling in an innings: 5/8 by Graham Gooch for Essex v Cheshire, 1995

== Gallery ==
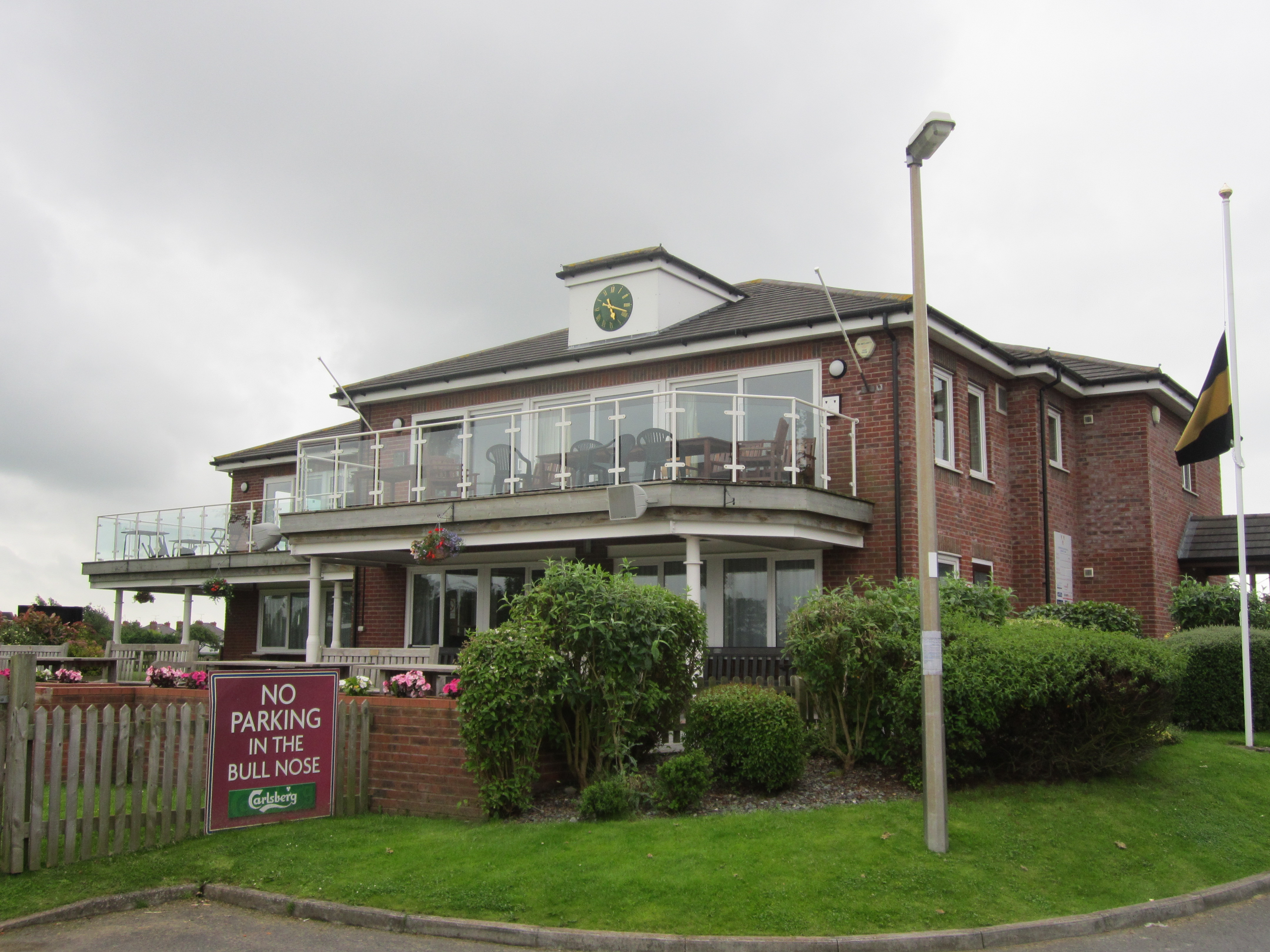
View of the pavilion.

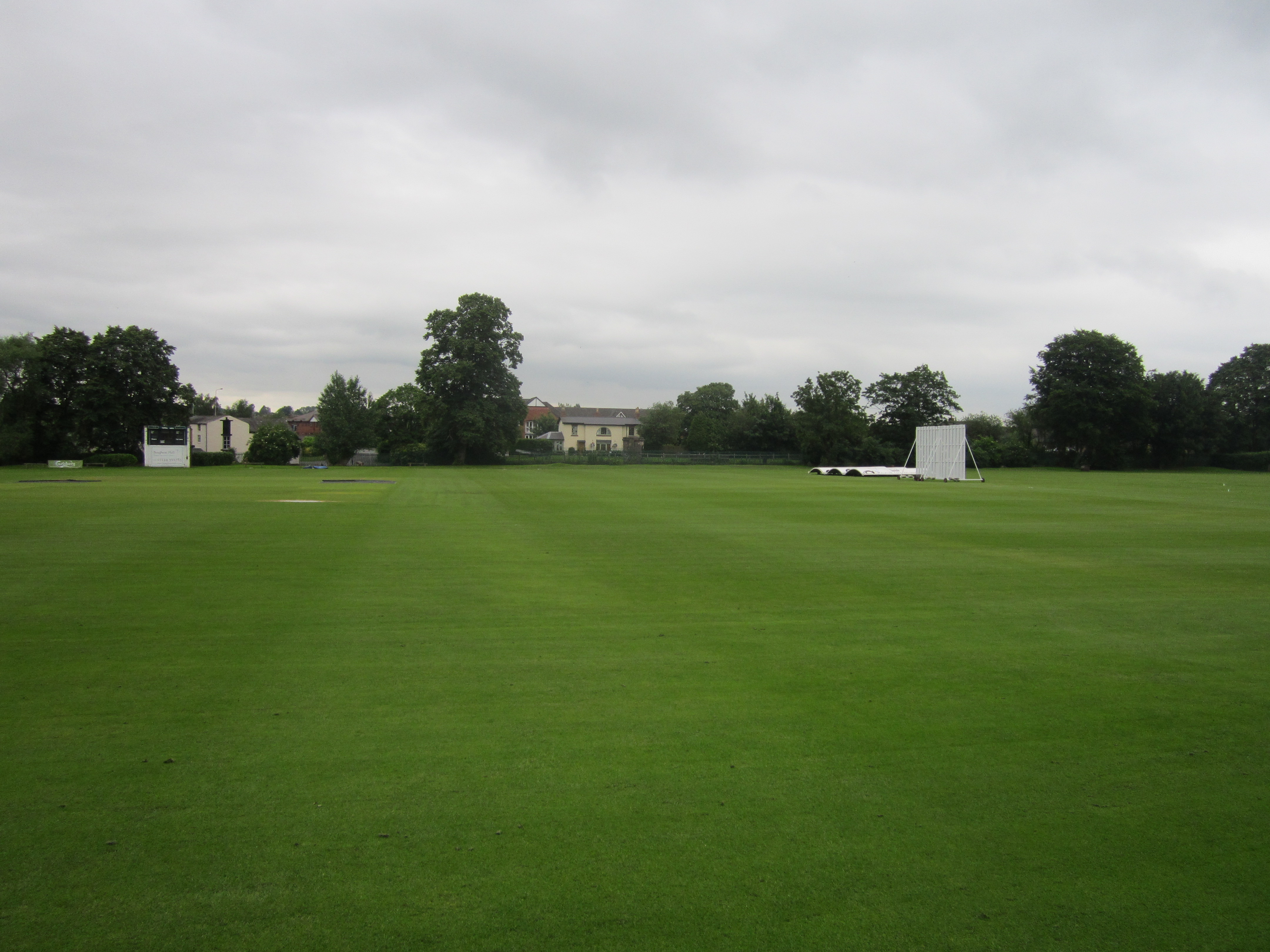
View of the ground looking north.

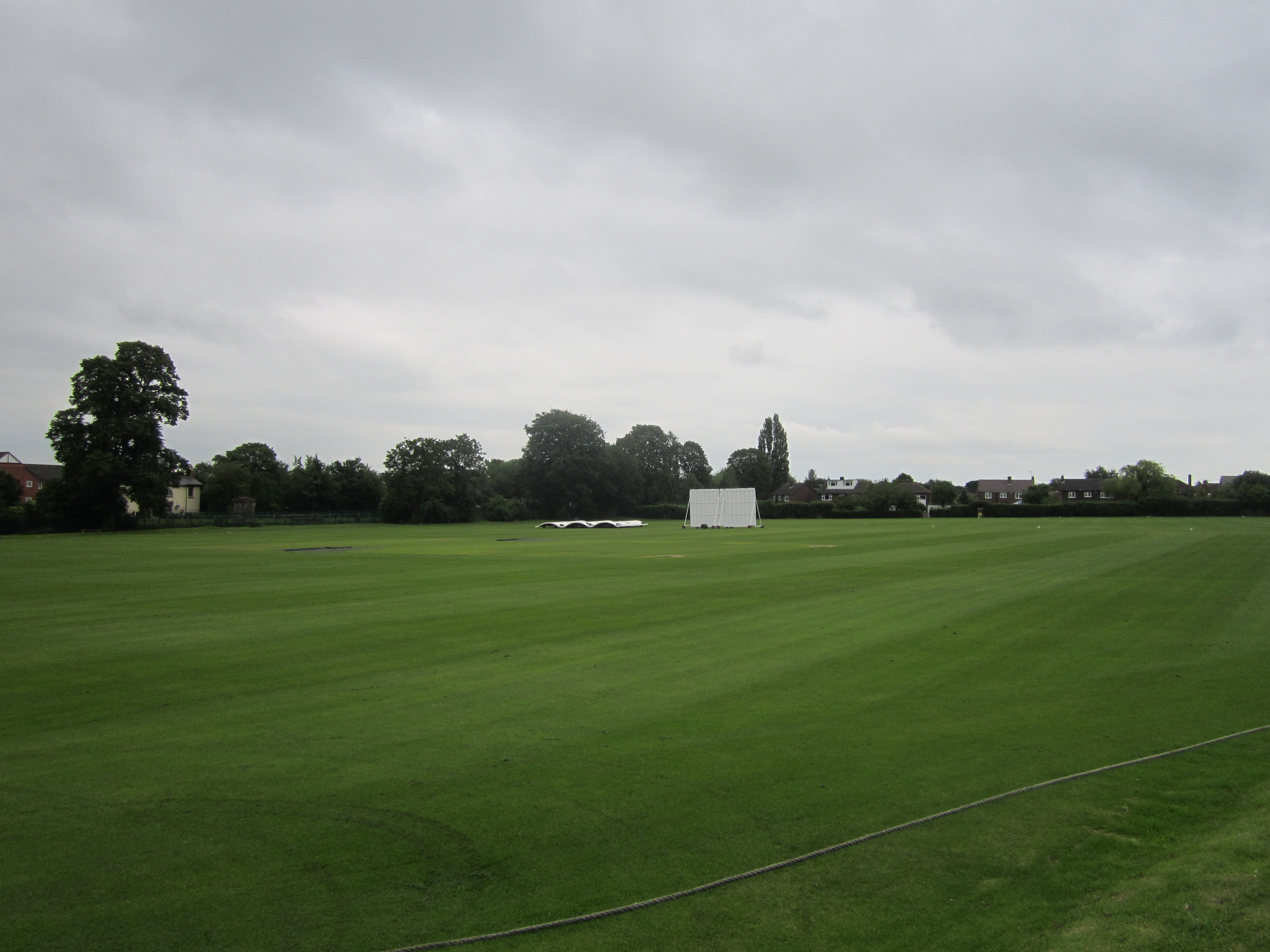
View of the ground looking east.

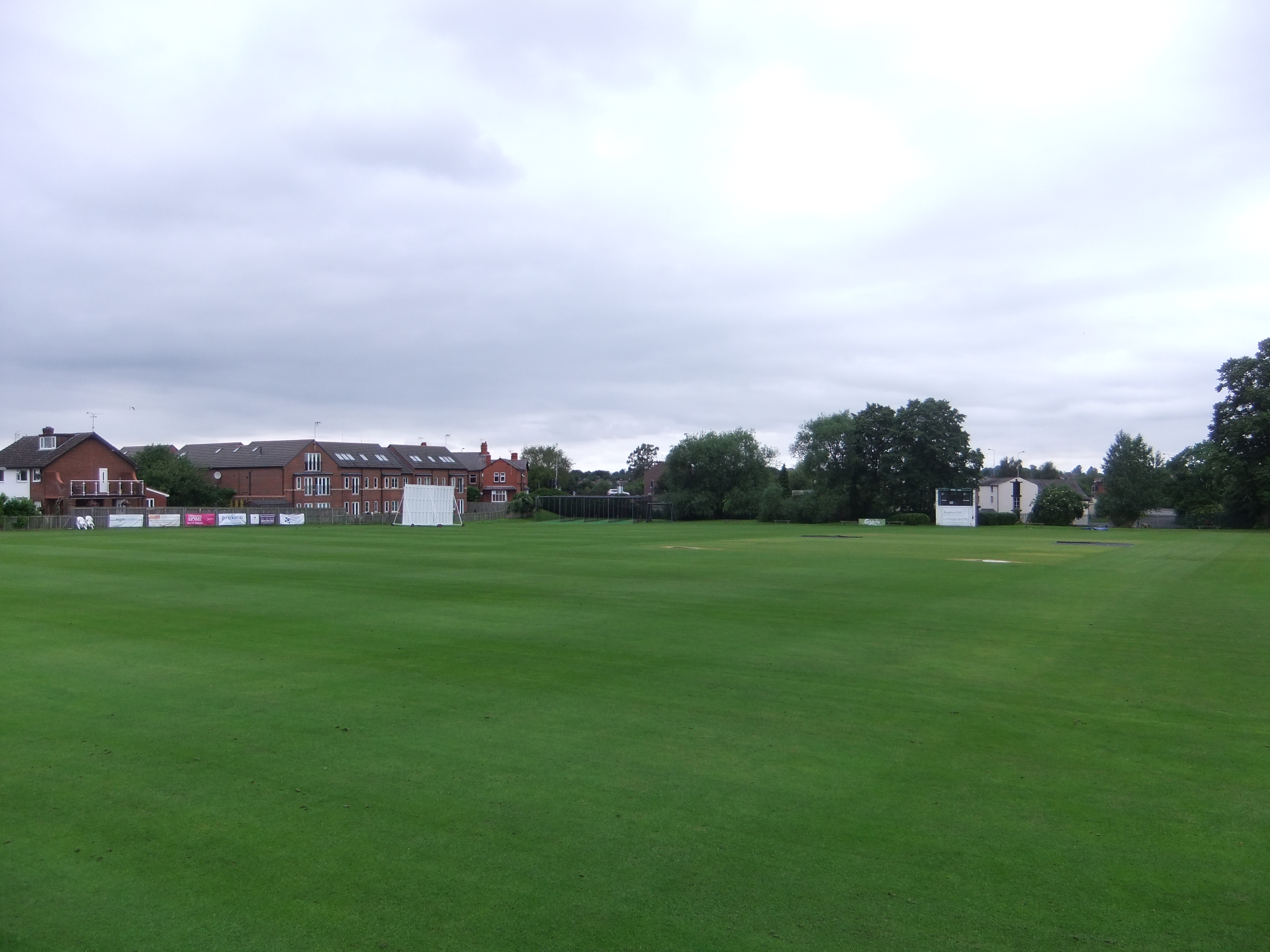
Wider view of the ground.

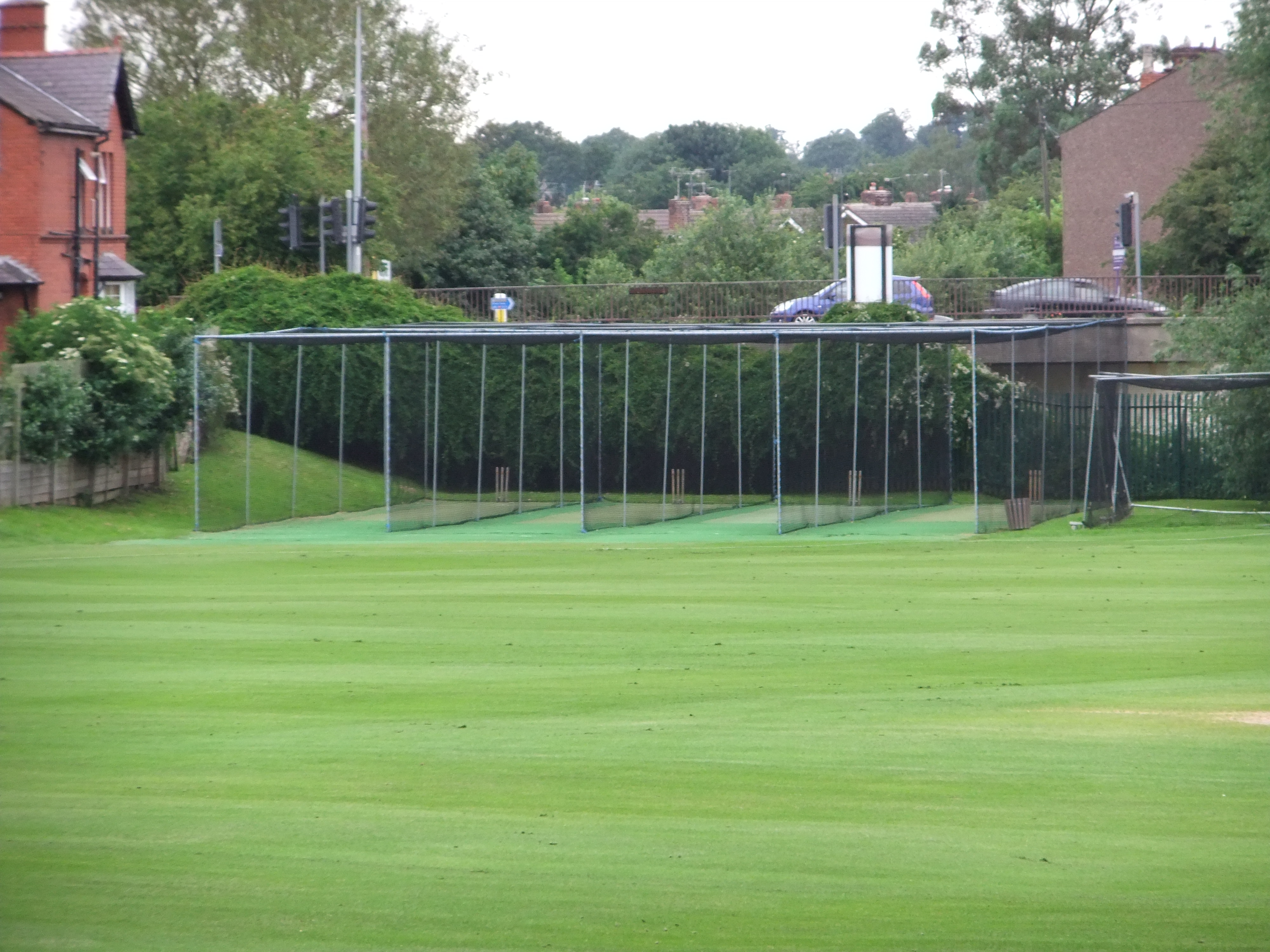
Practice nets at the ground.

== See also ==
- List of cricket grounds in England and Wales
