= Jon Ayling =

English cricketer

Personal information
- Full name: Jonathan Richard Ayling
- Born: 13 June 1967 (age 59); Portsmouth, Hampshire, England
- Batting: Right-handed
- Bowling: Right-arm medium

Domestic team information
- Years: Team
- 1987–1993: Hampshire

Career statistics
Competition	First-class	List A
Matches	60	94
Runs scored	2,082	1,028
Batting average	26.69	22.84
100s/50s	1/11	–/1
Top score	121	56
Balls bowled	7,374	4,413
Wickets	134	93
Bowling average	25.41	35.91
5 wickets in innings	1	–
10 wickets in match	–	–
Best bowling	5/12	4/37
Catches/stumpings	17/–	18/–
- Source: Cricinfo, 12 December 2009

Jonathan Richard Ayling (born 13 June 1967) is an English former first-class cricketer and cricket coach. He played first-class and List A one-day cricket for Hampshire as an all-rounder between 1987 and 1993, though ultimately his career came to a premature end through injury. Following his retirement, he was assistant and bowling coach at Hampshire until 2012.

== Playing career ==
Ayling was born in Portsmouth in June 1967; his father was a physician, who was the medical doctor for Hampshire County Cricket Club. He was educated at The Portsmouth Grammar School, where in 1985 he won 'The Cricket Society Wetherall Award for the Leading All-Rounder in English Schools Cricket'. In the same year he played for the Southern Schools XI, opening the batting alongside future England captain Nasser Hussain. Ayling made his debut for Hampshire in List A one-day cricket in the 1987 Refuge Assurance League, playing against Somerset and Kent. The following season, he made his debut in first-class cricket for Hampshire against Oxford University at Oxford, with Ayling establishing himself in the Hampshire as he went onto make eighteen appearances in the 1988 County Championship, alongside nineteen one-day appearances; he played in the final of the 1988 Benson & Hedges Cup against Derbyshire at Lord's, taking the wicket of Bernie Maher in Hampshire's seven wickets victory. In his first season of first-class cricket, Ayling scored 711 runs at an average of 24.51, whilst with his medium pace bowling, he took 47 wickets at a bowling average of 23.36.

During a pre-season friendly against Sussex in April 1989, Ayling was involved in a collision with batsman David Smith, which resulted in Ayling seriously injuring his knee. At first the ruptured knee ligament he sustained was predicted to rule him out for six-weeks, but knee surgery in July ruled him out for the remainder of the 1989 season. Having recovered from his injury by the 1990 season, Ayling returned to play for Hampshire. He made nine first-class appearances from July, alongside 22 one-day appearances. During the season, he claimed 26 one-day wickets at an average of 30.19. The following season, he played in ten first-class matches and took 25 wickets at an average of 23.80, which was a marked improvement on the previous season. In one-day cricket, he made twenty appearances, in which he took 22 wickets, though he averaged nearly 40 runs per wicket. He played in the final of the 1991 NatWest Trophy against Surrey at Lord's, contributing to Hampshire's victory by dismissing Alec Stewart and Darren Bicknell, in addition to scoring the winning runs in the final over.

During the 1992 season, he made eighteen first-class and 22 one-day appearances. In first-class cricket that season, he enjoyed his best season as a bowler, taking 48 wickets at an average of 20.60; against Middlesex, he took his only career five wicket haul when he claimed 5 for 12 in Middlesex's first innings, with Ayling having scored a half century (57) in Hampshire's first innings. In one-day cricket, he played in the final of the 1992 Benson & Hedges Cup against Kent, with him taking the wickets of Neil Taylor and Matthew Fleming for the cost of 38 runs, with Hampshire claiming victory by 41 runs. Ayling made four first-class and nine one-day appearances in 1993, before being forced to retire in July of that year due to a persistent knee injury. After retiring, he played club cricket for Portsmouth Cricket Club.

A hard-hitting batsman, in 60 first-class matches he scored 2,082 runs at an average of 26.96; he made one century, with a score of 121 against Oxford University in 1992. As a bowler, it was noted by Bob Woolmer that he had the ability to swing the ball away from right-handers. He took 134 wickets at an average of 25.41. In one-day cricket, his 94 appearances yielded him 2,082 runs and 93 wickets at an average of 35.91.

== Coaching career ==
Following his retirement, Ayling was appointed as cricket coach at Winchester College for five years before returning to Hampshire as their fast bowling and assistant coach for a number of years. He remained a coach at Hampshire until 2012, when he departed Hampshire to take up a teaching role at Dauntsey's School in Wiltshire. He left Dauntsey's in 2021 to become head of cricket development at The Portsmouth Grammar School.
