= Stears =

Stears is a surname. Notable people with the surname include:

- Anne Stears, South African cricketer
- John Stears (1934–1999), English special effects expert
- Marc Stears (born 1971), English political scientist

== See also ==
- Stear
