= Philip Wormald =

English cricketer

Personal information
- Full name: Philip Bryan Wormald
- Born: 4 May 1963 (age 63); Sutton-in-Ashfield, Nottinghamshire, England
- Batting: Right-handed
- Bowling: Right-arm medium-fast

Domestic team information
- Years: Team
- 1987–1991: Shropshire

Career statistics
Competition	List A
Matches	4
Runs scored	42
Batting average	14.00
100s/50s	0/0
Top score	16
Balls bowled	207
Wickets	5
Bowling average	31.40
5 wickets in innings	0
10 wickets in match	–
Best bowling	2/85
Catches/stumpings	1/–
- Source: Cricinfo, 4 July 2011

Philip Bryan Wormald (born 4 May 1963) is a former English cricketer. Wormald was a right-handed batsman who bowled right-arm medium-fast. He was born in Sutton-in-Ashfield, Nottinghamshire.

Wormald made his debut for Shropshire in the 1987 Minor Counties Championship against the Somerset Second XI. Wormald played Minor counties cricket for Shropshire from 1987 to 1991, which included 32 Minor Counties Championship appearances and 8 MCCA Knockout Trophy appearances. He made his List A debut against Hampshire in the 1988 NatWest Trophy. He made 3 further List A appearances, the last of which came against Leicestershire in the 1991 NatWest Trophy. In his 4 List A matches, he scored 42 runs at an average of 14.00, with a high score of 16. With the ball he took 5 wickets at a bowling average of 31.40, with best figures of 2/85.
