= Mark Woodman =

English cricketer

Personal information
- Full name: Mark Christopher Woodman
- Born: 12 February 1967 (age 59); Orpington, London, England
- Batting: Right-handed
- Bowling: Right-arm medium

Domestic team information
- Years: Team
- 1987–1998: Devon

Career statistics
Competition	List A
Matches	6
Runs scored	9
Batting average	3.00
100s/50s	–/–
Top score	8
Balls bowled	402
Wickets	3
Bowling average	70.00
5 wickets in innings	–
10 wickets in match	–
Best bowling	1/16
Catches/stumpings	1/–
- Source: Cricinfo, 6 February 2011

Mark Christopher Woodman (born 12 February 1967) is a former English cricketer. Woodman was a right-handed batsman who bowled right-arm medium pace. He was born in Orpington, London.

Woodman made his debut for Devon in the 1987 Minor Counties Championship against Berkshire. From 1987 to 1998, he represented the county in 65 Championship matches, the last of which came against Cheshire. He made his MCCA Knockout Trophy debut for the place in 1988 against Dorset. From 1988 to 1994, he represented the county in 20 Trophy matches, the last of which came against Bedfordshire. Woodman also played List A cricket for Devon at a time when they were permitted to take part in the domestic one-day competition, making his debut in that format in the 1988 NatWest Trophy against Nottinghamshire. He played 5 further List A matches between 1988 and 1995, the last of which came against Sussex. In his 6 List A matches, he scored 9 runs at a batting average of 3.00, with a high score of 8. With the ball he took 3 wickets at a bowling average of 70.00, with best figures of 1/16.
