= Tom Moody =

Australian cricketer

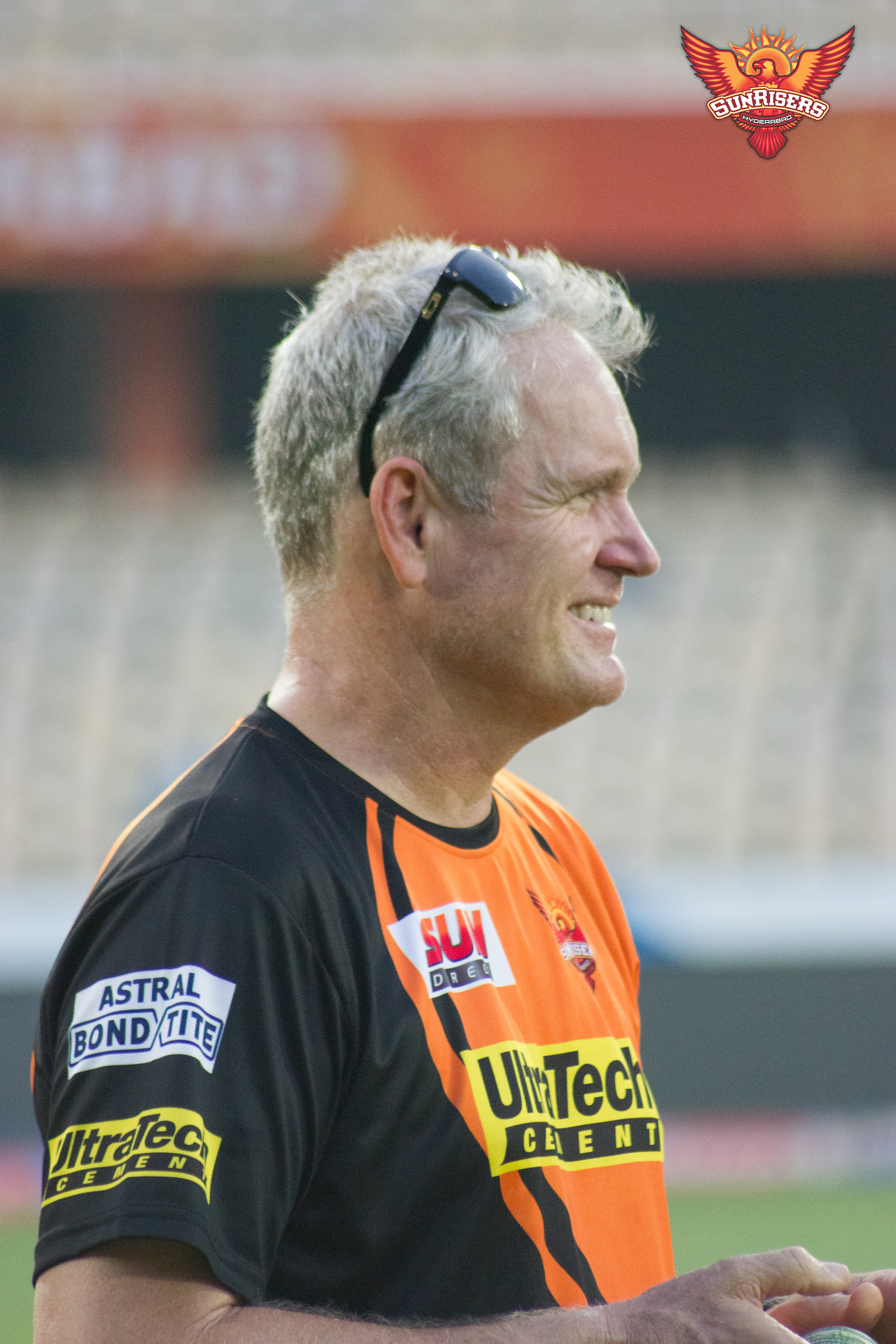
- Moody in 2017 as Head Coach of Sunrisers Hyderabad

Personal information
- Full name: Thomas Masson Moody
- Born: 2 October 1965 (age 61); Adelaide, South Australia
- Nickname: Moods, Big Tom, Moonshine
- Height: 198 cm (6 ft 6 in)
- Batting: Right-handed
- Bowling: Right-arm medium
- Role: Batsman
- Relatives: David Moody (nephew)

International information
- National side: Australia (1987–1999)
- Test debut (cap 348): 24 November 1989 v New Zealand
- Last Test: 8 September 1992 v Sri Lanka
- ODI debut (cap 98): 9 October 1987 v India
- Last ODI: 24 October 1999 v Zimbabwe

Domestic team information
- Years: Team
- 1985/86–2000/01: Western Australia
- 1990: Warwickshire
- 1991–1999: Worcestershire

Head coaching information
- Years: Team
- 2005–2007: Sri Lanka
- 2007–2010: Western Australia
- 2008–2010: Kings XI Punjab
- 2013–2019, 2022: Sunrisers Hyderabad
- 2017–2026: Rangpur Riders
- 2018–2019: Multan Sultans
- 2021–2025: Oval Invincibles

Career statistics
Competition	Test	ODI	FC	LA
Matches	8	76	300	366
Runs scored	456	1,211	21,001	11,258
Batting average	32.57	23.28	46.25	38.82
100s/50s	2/3	0/10	64/94	18/77
Top score	106	89	272	180*
Balls bowled	432	2,797	23,980	11,534
Wickets	2	52	361	257
Bowling average	73.50	38.73	30.70	30.02
5 wickets in innings	0	0	10	0
10 wickets in match	0	0	2	0
Best bowling	1/17	3/25	7/38	4/24
Catches/stumpings	9/–	21/–	294/–	130/–
Medal record
Men's Cricket
Representing Australia
ICC Cricket World Cup
Winner	1987 India and Pakistan
Winner	1999 England-Wales -Ireland-Scotland-Netherlands
Commonwealth Games
Silver medal – second place	1998 Kuala Lumpur
Representing Sri Lanka as Coach
ICC Cricket World Cup
Runner-up	2007 West Indies
- Source: Cricinfo, 16 May 2005

Thomas Masson Moody (born 2 October 1965) is a former Australian international cricketer and current Director of Cricket of Sri Lanka Cricket. He ended his long tenure with the Indian Premier League team Sunrisers Hyderabad in August 2022 and was earlier appointed Director of Cricket at Desert Vipers, one of the six franchises in the ILT20, which was scheduled to begin in the UAE in January 2023. Moody was a part of the Australian team that won their first world title during the 1987 Cricket World Cup, and their second in the 1999 Cricket World Cup. He was the coach of the Sri Lankan team which finished as runners-up at the 2007 Cricket World Cup.

== Early life ==
Schooled at Guildford Grammar School in Perth, where his father was headmaster, he exhibited talent for athletics (particularly the high jump) and Australian rules football but excelled at cricket. He was selected to train with the 1st XI side (usually made up of year twelve students) at just thirteen, and play with them the following year.

== Playing career ==
"Long" Tom Moody, so nicknamed for his 1.98-metre height, began his first-class career in the 1985/86 season with Western Australia in the Sheffield Shield and also played in England with Warwickshire and Worcestershire. Captaining WA and Worcester to various trophies, Moody, an aggressive and fast scoring batsman, scored over 20,000 first-class runs and hit 64 centuries; he was also a useful medium pace bowler. On 27 July 1990, in a county match against Glamorgan County Cricket Club he scored a 36 ball century. His 1,387 List A runs for Worcestershire in 1991 is a record for the county. He captained the Worcestershire side from 1995 to 1999 and was a key member of the side which won the 1991 Benson & Hedges Cup and the 1994 NatWest Trophy.

He made his ODI debut on 9 October 1987 against India during the 1987 World Cup in Chennai. He made his test debut against New Zealand on 24 November 1989 and scored 61 on his debut.

He played eight Test matches for Australia between 1989 and 1992, although he had more success with Australia's one-day team, appearing in three World Cups and two finals – 1987 and 1999 – alongside Steve Waugh. He also became the first of two Australians alongside Steve Waugh to win two World Cup tournaments. He was even more successful when he threw a haggis the distance of 230 feet in 1989. He registered a 28 ball fifty against Bangladesh at the 1999 World Cup which was regarded as the then World Cup record for the fastest fifty.

In 1994, he along with Tim Curtis set the record for the highest ever partnership for the 3rd wicket in List A cricket history (309*) He retired from all forms of cricket in 2000-01 due to sustaining a back injury in his later career and was replaced by Simon Katich as the captain of Western Australia.

== Coaching career ==
Since retirement in 2001, Moody has coached, been an Australian cricketer's representative and for several years held the post of director of cricket with Worcestershire since 2001. He also served as the President of Australian Cricketers' Association for a brief stint. In 2005, he was in contention of coaching Indian team but the role was accepted by Greg Chappell. In May 2005, he was appointed coach of the Sri Lankan national team and he led them to the final of the 2007 Cricket World Cup before leaving the post. Moody was also in the frame again to become the head coach of Indian team replacing Greg Chappell for the 2007 World Cup but the speculations were later rubbished. He was also in contention to become the head coach of Australian cricket team replacing John Buchanan in 2007 but he pulled out of the race as he was not initially ready to return to Australia.

On 14 May 2007, the WACA announced Moody's appointment as manager and head coach of the Western Australia cricket team for the next three years until 2010. He coached Kings XI Punjab for the first three seasons of Indian Premier League in 2008, 2009 and 2010. Trevor Penney, England's fielding coach during the 2005 Ashes series and assistant to Moody in Sri Lanka joined as assistant coach. However Moody announced in March 2010 that he would not seek a new contract after the 2009–2010 season. Under Moody, Western Australia qualified for one final in three seasons, in the KFC Twenty20 Big Bash, in his first season which it lost to Victoria.

He then began cricket commentary around the world as well as covering some Australian Test and ODI Cricket for Channel Nine and the Big Bash League for Channel Ten. Moody still regularly commentates on both television and radio throughout the Australian international and domestic season.

In December 2012, it was announced that Moody would coach the Sunrisers Hyderabad team which was newly included in IPL ahead of the 2013 IPL season. Over the course of 2013–2019, Sunrisers Hyderabad have reached the qualifier rounds five times and won the IPL title in 2016. Moody had coached the SRH franchise for seven consecutive years. He had also coached the Rangpur Riders team in the Bangladesh Premier League.

Moody's long involvement in the game has been recognised over the recent years with appointments to two significant consultancy roles. The first being appointed as the International Director of Cricket for the Caribbean Premier League (CPL) and the second being appointed in 2014 as Director of Cricket with the Melbourne Renegades in the Big Bash League. On 22 September 2017, it was announced that Moody would be appointed as the head coach of the newest team Multan Sultans in the Pakistan Super League for the 2018 season.

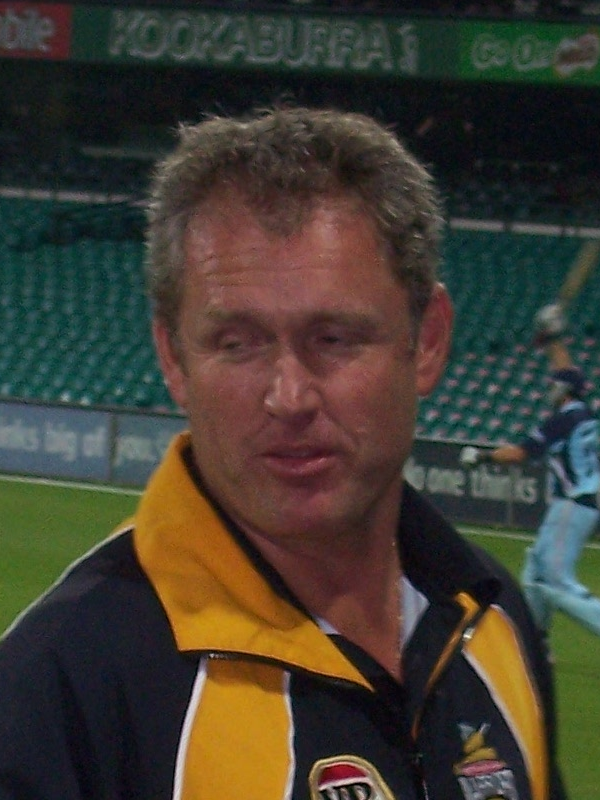
Moody in 2008 coaching Western Australia.

In June 2019, he was named as the coach of the Montreal Tigers franchise team for the 2019 Global T20 Canada tournament. Moody was replaced with Trevor Bayliss as the head coach of Sunrisers Hyderabad for the 2020 Indian Premier League. However, on 15 December 2020, Moody was appointed as the Director of Cricket of Sunrisers Hyderabad ahead of the 2021 IPL season.

In February 2021, he was appointed as the director of cricket of Sri Lanka cricket with the influence of Technical Advisory Committee of Sri Lanka Cricket led by Aravinda de Silva. He also became the first director of Sri Lanka cricket, a role which was newly created by SLC to uplift the standards of cricket in Sri Lanka. He was handed over a contract spanning three years and his job role includes analysis of future tour programmes, domestic structure, performance based contracts to Sri Lankan players, player welfare, education, training and development. In May 2021, he was appointed as the consultant coach of the Sri Lankan team for the white ball series against England.

== Notes ==
- Benaud, Richie (1991). Border & Co: A Tribute To Cricket's World Champions. Hamlyn Australia. ISBN 0-947334-31-9.
- Tom Moody at Cricinfo

Sporting positions
Preceded by Tim Curtis	Worcestershire County Cricket Captain; 1995–1999	Succeeded by Graeme Hick
Preceded by John Dyson	Head coach of Sri Lankan national cricket team 2005–2007	Succeeded by Trevor Bayliss
