= Paul Brown (cricketer) =

English cricketer

Personal information
- Full name: Paul Anthony Brown
- Born: 13 May 1965 (age 61); Crediton, Devon, England
- Batting: Right-handed
- Bowling: Right-arm medium

Domestic team information
- Years: Team
- 1981–1990: Devon

Career statistics
| Competition | List A |
|---|---|
| Matches | 3 |
| Runs scored | 93 |
| Batting average | 93.00 |
| 100s/50s | –/1 |
| Top score | 67* |
| Balls bowled | 144 |
| Wickets | 2 |
| Bowling average | 66.00 |
| 5 wickets in innings | – |
| 10 wickets in match | – |
| Best bowling | 2/49 |
| Catches/stumpings | –/– |
- Source: Cricinfo, 5 February 2011

Paul Anthony Brown (born 13 May 1965) is a former English cricketer. Brown was a right-handed batsman who bowled right-arm medium pace. He was born in Crediton, Devon.

In 1981, Brown he made his debut for Devon in the Minor Counties Championship against Oxfordshire. From 1981 to 1990, Brown represented Devon in 17 Championship matches, the last of which came against Wiltshire. In 1986, he made his List A debut for the county against Nottinghamshire in the 1st round of the 1986 NatWest Trophy. He played 2 further List A matches, against Nottinghamshire in the 1st round of the 1988 NatWest Trophy and Somerset in the 1st round of the 1990 NatWest Trophy. In those 3 matches, he scored 93 with a half century high score of 67*. Two out of his three innings were unbeaten. With the ball he took 2 wickets at a bowling average of 66.00, with best figures of 2/49. In the season following his List A debut, Brown made his MCCA Knockout Trophy debut against Dorset. He played one further Trophy match in 1990, his last, against Lincolnshire.
