= Paul Butler (cricketer) =

English cricketer (born 1963)

Personal information
- Full name: Paul Richard Butler
- Born: 26 June 1963 (age 63); Sleaford, Lincolnshire, England
- Batting: Right-handed
- Bowling: Right-arm medium

Domestic team information
- Years: Team
- 1983–1995: Lincolnshire

Career statistics
Competition	List A
Matches	2
Runs scored	37
Batting average	18.50
100s/50s	–/–
Top score	33
Balls bowled	17
Wickets	3
Bowling average	6.66
5 wickets in innings	–
10 wickets in match	–
Best bowling	3/20
Catches/stumpings	1/–
- Source: Cricinfo, 25 June 2011

Paul Richard Butler (born 26 June 1963) is a former English cricketer. Butler was a right-handed batsman who bowled right-arm medium pace. He was born in Sleaford, Lincolnshire.

Butler made his debut for Lincolnshire in the 1983 Minor Counties Championship against Cumberland. Butler played Minor counties cricket for Lincolnshire from 1983 to 1995, which included 51 Minor Counties Championship matches and 11 MCCA Knockout Trophy matches. He made his List A debut against Surrey in the 1983 NatWest Trophy. He scored 4 runs in the match, before being dismissed by Ian Payne. He played a further List A match for Lincolnshire against Lancashire in the 1988 NatWest Trophy. In this match, he took 3 wickets for the cost of 20 runs from 2.5 overs, while with the bat he scored 33 runs before being dismissed by Jack Simmons.
