= Gordon McGurk =

Scottish cricketer

Personal information
- Full name: Gordon Benedict John McGurk
- Born: 5 September 1965 (age 61); Edinburgh, Midlothian, Scotland
- Batting: Right-handed

Domestic team information
- Years: Team
- 1988–1995: Scotland

Career statistics
Competition	First-class	List A
Matches	2	12
Runs scored	108	190
Batting average	54.00	17.27
100s/50s	–/1	–/–
Top score	63	37
Catches/stumpings	12/–	3/–
- Source: Cricinfo, 19 June 2022

Gordon Benedict John McGurk (born 5 September 1965) is a Scottish lawyer and former cricketer.

One of ten children of Dr Francis Myrle McGurk, and his wife Josephine, McGurk was born at Edinburgh in September 1965. A club cricketer for Uddingston Cricket Club, McGurk made his debut for Scotland in a List A one-day match against Warwickshire at Edgbaston in the 1988 NatWest Trophy. He was a regular in the Scottish eleven in one-day cricket in 1988 and 1989 in both the Benson & Hedges Cup and the NatWest Trophy, but did not feature for Scotland in one-day cricket between 1989 and 1994. He returned to Scottish one-day side in 1994 and 1995 in matches in the Benson & Hedges Cup and the NatWest Trophy. In 12 one-day matches for Scotland, he scored 190 runs at an average of 17.27, with a highest score of 37. In addition to playing one-day cricket for Scotland, McGurk also made two appearances in first-class cricket against Ireland in 1988 and 1994, making a half century in the 1988 match.

McGurk gained a PhD in genetics from the University of Edinburgh and later emigrated to Australia, where he gained the degree of Juris Doctor from Southern Cross University. He is a lawyer in the Supreme Court of Queensland, specialising in clinical trials and research integrity. He is chairperson of the Royal Brisbane and Women's Hospital Human Research Ethics Committee.
