= Robert Savage (cricketer) =

English cricketer

Personal information
- Full name: Robert Rodney Savage
- Born: 20 December 1960 (age 65); Southampton, Hampshire, England
- Batting: Right-handed

Domestic team information
- Years: Team
- 1986–1995: Wiltshire

Career statistics
| Competition | LA |
|---|---|
| Matches | 2 |
| Runs scored | 58 |
| Batting average | 29.00 |
| 100s/50s | –/– |
| Top score | 32 |
| Balls bowled | – |
| Wickets | – |
| Bowling average | – |
| 5 wickets in innings | – |
| 10 wickets in match | – |
| Best bowling | – |
| Catches/stumpings | 2/– |
- Source: Cricinfo, 11 October 2010

Robert Rodney Savage (born 20 December 1960) is a former English cricketer. Savage was a right-handed batsman. He was born at Southampton, Hampshire.

Savage made his Minor Counties Championship debut for Wiltshire in 1986 against Dorset. From 1986 to 1995, he represented the county in 44 Minor Counties Championship matches, the last of which came against Wales Minor Counties. Savage also represented Wiltshire in the MCCA Knockout Trophy. His debut in that competition came against Cornwall in 1988. From 1988 to 1994, he represented the county in 11 Trophy matches, the last of which came against Devon.

Savage also represented Wiltshire in 2 List A matches. His 2 List A matches came against Essex in the 1988 NatWest Trophy and Durham in the 1993 NatWest Trophy. In his 2 List A matches, he scored 58 runs at a batting average of 29.00, with a high score of 32. In the field he took 2 catches.
