= Guy Franks =

English cricketer (born 1962)

Personal information
- Full name: Jonathan Guy Franks
- Born: 23 September 1962 (age 64); Stamford, Lincolnshire, England
- Batting: Right-handed
- Role: Wicket-keeper

Domestic team information
- Years: Team
- 1990–1992: Hertfordshire
- 1984–1985: Combined Universities
- 1983–1985: Oxford University
- 1980–1989: Lincolnshire

Career statistics
Competition	First-class	List A
Matches	16	6
Runs scored	339	77
Batting average	16.15	19.25
100s/50s	–/–	–/–
Top score	42*	42
Balls bowled	–	–
Wickets	–	–
Bowling average	–	–
5 wickets in innings	–	–
10 wickets in match	–	–
Best bowling	–	–
Catches/stumpings	14/2	1/–
- Source: Cricinfo, 30 June 2011

Jonathan Guy Franks (born 23 September 1962) is an English former cricketer. Franks was a right-handed batsman who fielded as a wicket-keeper. He was born in Stamford, Lincolnshire and attended Stamford School.

Franks made his debut for Lincolnshire in the 1980 Minor Counties Championship against Cambridgeshire. Franks played Minor counties cricket for Lincolnshire from 1980 to 1989, which included 46 appearances in the Minor Counties Championship and 7 MCCA Knockout Trophy appearances. His List A debut for Lincolnshire came against Surrey in the 1983 NatWest Trophy. In this match, he scored 10 runs before being dismissed by Ian Payne. He later made a second List A appearance for the county in 1988 NatWest Trophy against Lancashire. In this match, he opened the batting, scoring 42 runs before being dismissed by Jack Simmons.

While playing for Lincolnshire, he also played first-class cricket for Oxford University, making his debut against Sussex in 1983. From 1983 to 1985, he made 15 further first-class appearances, the last of which came against Cambridge University. In his 16 first-class matches, he scored 339 runs at an average of 16.14, with a high score of 42 not out. Behind the stumps he took 14 catches and made 2 stumpings. He played List A cricket for Combined Universities in the 1984 Benson & Hedges Cup against Surrey. He made 3 further List A appearances for the Universities team, the last of which came against Sussex in the 1985 Benson & Hedges Cup. In his 4 matches for the team, he scored 25 runs at an average of 12.50, with a high score of 22 not out.

Franks left Lincolnshire at the end of the 1989 season. He joined Hertfordshire in 1990, making his debut for the county in that seasons Minor Counties Championship against Cumberland. He made 2 further appearances for Hertfordshire, against Buckinghamshire and Lincolnshire, both in the 1992 Minor Counties Championship.

Franks is now a director at an insurance broker in Cheshire.
