= Tony Merrick =

Antiguan cricketer

Personal information
- Full name: Tyrone Anthony Merrick
- Born: 10 June 1963 (age 63); St. John's, Antigua and Barbuda
- Batting: Right-handed
- Bowling: Right-arm fast-medium
- Role: Bowler

Domestic team information
- Years: Team
- 1982/83–1988/89: Leeward Islands
- 1987–1989: Warwickshire
- 1990–1991: Kent
- FC debut: 11 February 1982 Leeward Islands v Jamaica
- Last FC: 3 September 1991 Kent v Sussex
- LA debut: 19 February 1984 Leeward Islands v Windward Islands
- Last LA: 19 August 1991 Kent v Northants

Career statistics
| Competition | First-class | List A |
|---|---|---|
| Matches | 88 | 73 |
| Runs scored | 1,265 | 293 |
| Batting average | 14.37 | 13.31 |
| 100s/50s | 0/2 | 0/1 |
| Top score | 74* | 59 |
| Balls bowled | 14,807 | 2,277 |
| Wickets | 311 | 84 |
| Bowling average | 25.45 | 27.10 |
| 5 wickets in innings | 15 | 0 |
| 10 wickets in match | 2 | 0 |
| Best bowling | 7/45 | 4/24 |
| Catches/stumpings | 30/– | 10/– |
- Source: CricInfo, 22 December 2018

Tyrone Anthony Merrick (born 10 June 1963) is an Antiguan former professional cricketer. Merrick was a fast bowler and became a groundsman after his retirement from playing cricket.

Merrick was born at St. John's in Antigua. He made his first-class cricket debut for Leeward Islands against Jamaica in February 1983 in the Shell Shield competition. He went on to play first-class and List A cricket for Leeward Islands and in English county cricket for Warwickshire and Kent until retiring in September 1991. He played for the West Indies B and under-23 sides. He was considered by Malcolm Speed to be a good enough bowler to have played Test cricket for any other side, but at the time Merrick played the West Indies had an excellent group of fast bowlers.

Since retiring Merrick has been a pitch consultant and has been the head groundsman at the Sir Vivian Richards Stadium. He was head groundsman at the stadium when the second Test between West Indies and England was abandoned after 10 balls in February 2009 due to the outfield being unsuitable for play – although, in what The Scotsman called a "curious state of affairs", Merrick was not responsible for the outfield at the stadium. He has also been involved with pitch preparation at the Antigua Recreation Ground at St. John's.
