= Mike Garnham =

English cricketer

Personal information
- Full name: Michael Anthony Garnham
- Born: 20 August 1960 (age 66); Johannesburg, South Africa
- Batting: Right-handed
- Role: Wicketkeeper-batsman

Domestic team information
- Years: Team
- 1978–1979: Gloucestershire
- 1980–1988: Leicestershire
- 1989–1995: Essex

Career statistics
Competition	FC	List A
Matches	207	256
Runs scored	6240	2640
Batting average	27.48	18.72
100s/50s	5/33	1/4
Top score	123	110
Balls bowled	24	–
Wickets	0	–
Bowling average	–	–
5 wickets in innings	–	–
10 wickets in match	–	–
Best bowling	–	–
Catches/stumpings	429/41	217/37
- Source: Cricinfo, 4 June 2022

Michael Anthony Garnham (born 20 August 1960) is a former English cricketer who played for Essex, Leicestershire and Gloucestershire as a wicket-keeper/batsman between 1979 and 1995.

While attending North Devon College in Barnstaple, Garnham was selected to tour India with an English Schools team in 1977-78. He also toured Australia with England Young Cricketers in 1978-79.

In 1985 Garnham helped Leicestershire win the Benson and Hedges Cup, joining Peter Willey in an unbroken match-clinching partnership of 80 in the final. He also played in the Essex sides which won the County Championship in 1991 and 1992. He made his highest first-class score of 123 in Essex's victory over Leicestershire in September 1991, when he and Nasser Hussain added 316 for the fifth wicket.

Garnham now lives in Halstead, Essex. He works in planning in rural north Essex.
