= Chris Tavaré =

English cricketer

Personal information
- Full name: Christopher James Tavaré
- Born: 27 October 1954 (age 72); Orpington, Kent, England
- Nickname: Tav
- Height: 6 ft 1 in (1.85 m)
- Batting: Right-handed
- Bowling: Right-arm off break
- Role: Batsman

International information
- National side: England
- Test debut (cap 486): 5 June 1980 v West Indies
- Last Test: 11 July 1989 v Australia
- ODI debut (cap 54): 28 May 1980 v West Indies
- Last ODI: 26 March 1984 v Pakistan

Domestic team information
- Years: Team
- 1974–1988: Kent
- 1989–1993: Somerset

Career statistics
Competition	Tests	ODI	FC	LA
Matches	31	29	431	399
Runs scored	1,755	720	24,906	11,407
Batting average	32.50	27.69	38.79	33.45
100s/50s	2/12	0/4	48/138	14/65
Top score	149	83*	219	162*
Balls bowled	30	12	813	18
Wickets	0	0	5	0
Bowling average	–	–	144.40	–
5 wickets in innings	–	–	0	–
10 wickets in match	–	–	0	–
Best bowling	–	–	1/3	–
Catches/stumpings	20/–	7/–	418/–	168/–
- Source: CricInfo, 3 July 2008

Christopher James Tavaré (/ˈtævəreɪ/; born 27 October 1954) is a former English international cricketer who played in 31 Test matches and 29 One Day Internationals between 1980 and 1989. His style of play was characterised by long periods at the crease and a relatively slow rate of run-scoring.

== Life and career ==
Tavaré was born at Orpington in Kent and educated at Sevenoaks School and St John's College, Oxford, where he graduated with a degree in zoology. He played cricket for Oxford University, Kent County Cricket Club and Somerset County Cricket Club as an attacking right-handed batsman. He was part of the Kent sides which shared the 1977 County Championship with Middlesex, and won the Championship outright in 1978, as well as the 1978 Benson & Hedges Cup.

He impressed on his international debut in 1980, managing 82 not out in a one-day international against a strong West Indies team, winning the man of the match award in a losing cause. However he adapted his natural game to meet the requirements of the Test side, becoming a notorious blocker. He was dropped after two undistinguished tests that summer, during which, in the words of Wisden: "Survival, regrettably, had been Tavaré's only aim".

Recalled for the fifth test in 1981 against Australia at Old Trafford he scored 69 and 78, but was at the crease for twelve hours. During his 7-hour 78 in the second innings, he was overtaken by Ian Botham on his way to a century. Tavaré's runs however played an important role as England won the test and clinched the series and retained the Ashes.

This was the first of 26 consecutive tests for Tavaré, including tours of India, Sri Lanka and Australia, during which tests he made two test centuries and again achieved some notable feats of slow scoring. His 50 in five hours and fifty minutes, against Pakistan in 1982, was the second-slowest in the history of the English game. Among his slowest innings was a score of 35 runs in six-and-a-half hours at Madras in the 1981/82 season. In 2012, Alex Massie wrote that, for Tavaré, scoring runs seemed "a disagreeable, even vulgar, distraction from the pure task of surviving". At Perth in 1982 he made "an eight-hour 89, 60 minutes of which were entirely scoreless", although he did also make a more important and relatively rapid 89 in the Melbourne test narrowly won by England, also parrying the victory clinching chance for Geoff Miller to catch. In many of these Test matches at this stage Tavaré was pressed to open the innings due to the suspension of Graham Gooch, Geoff Boycott and Wayne Larkins from international cricket due to their participation in a rebel tour of South Africa, opening the batting rarely being Tavaré's position for Kent.

Tavaré averaged over 40 in a 1983 Test series against New Zealand, but was dropped after England's embarrassing defeat at Christchurch that winter in which he made 9 runs. He was recalled towards the end of the following summer, but the test selectors dropped Tavaré in 1984, following another time-consuming score of 14 against the Sri Lankans. Jonathan Agnew, a team-mate in this match, observed retrospectively that Tavaré "played a ghastly knock". Paul Downton also a team-mate, added: "Tavaré managed to bat himself out of the England side. It was his last Test for five years and he couldn't get it off the square". Within a week he then captained Kent to a narrow defeat in the 1984 NatWest Trophy final. To cap a difficult few months, in the words of Matthew Engel: "He was deposed as Kent captain, unpleasantly". Tavaré who had captained Kent for three years, was replaced by Chris Cowdrey, who took over at the start of the 1985 season.

Tavaré moved to Somerset as captain in 1989, following a successful benefit in 1988. Tavaré put himself back in the selectors' thoughts with an impressive televised unbeaten century, for which he was again made man of the match in a losing cause, in a Benson & Hedges Cup semi-final against Essex. Eventually he was recalled for one Test Match, the Third Test against Australia at Birmingham in the 1989 Ashes series. At this time Terry Alderman was enjoying rampant success against English batsmen. Tavaré was unable to repeat his earlier success at frustrating Australian bowlers and was dismissed for two in what proved to be his final test innings.

Tavaré was a biology teacher at his alma mater, Sevenoaks School until his retirement in 2018. He is the uncle of former Gloucestershire player William Tavaré, and first cousin of comedian Jim Tavaré.

Sporting positions
Preceded by Asif Iqbal	Kent County Cricket Club captain 1983–1984	Succeeded by Chris Cowdrey
Preceded by Vic Marks	Somerset County Cricket Captain; 1990–1993	Succeeded by Andy Hayhurst
