= Andrew Fox (cricketer) =

English cricketer

Personal information
- Full name: Andrew Fox
- Born: 7 November 1962 (age 64); Holmfirth, Yorkshire, England
- Batting: Right-handed
- Bowling: Right-arm medium-fast

Domestic team information
- Years: Team
- 1987–1991: Cheshire

Career statistics
Competition	List A
Matches	4
Runs scored	24
Batting average	8.00
100s/50s	–/–
Top score	11
Balls bowled	238
Wickets	8
Bowling average	16.62
5 wickets in innings	–
10 wickets in match	–
Best bowling	4/24
Catches/stumpings	–/–
- Source: Cricinfo, 7 April 2011

Andrew Fox (born 7 November 1962) is a former English cricketer. Fox was a right-handed batsman who bowled right-arm medium-fast. He was born in Holmfirth, Yorkshire.

== Professional cricket career ==
Fox made his debut for Cheshire in the 1987 MCCA Knockout Trophy against Cumberland. Fox played Minor counties cricket for Cheshire from 1987 to 1991, including 25 Minor Counties Championship matches and 12 MCCA Knockout Trophy matches. In 1987, he made his List A debut against Glamorgan in the NatWest Trophy. He played three further List A matches for Cheshire, the last of which came against Hampshire in the 1989 NatWest Trophy. In his four List A matches, he scored 24 runs at a batting average of 8.00, with a high score of 11. With the ball he took 8 wickets at a bowling average of 16.62, with best figures of 4/24. His best figures came against Derbyshire in the 1988 NatWest Trophy.

== Personal life ==
Fox is a qualified teacher with a degree from the University of Leicester, he first taught in Pocklington School in Yorkshire, before joining Liverpool College in 1986. He taught at the school alongside his cricket career for Cheshire. After retiring from playing cricket professionally in 1991 Fox continued to teach at the School. he taught mathematics and sport there for over three decades before retiring in 2022. Fox played cricket for the amateur cricket club Standish, based in Wigan, he captained the side and was later involved in coaching.
