= Mark Stear =

English cricketer (born 1958)

Personal information
- Full name: Mark Gregory Stear
- Born: 8 December 1958 (age 67); Kensington, London, England
- Batting: Right-handed
- Bowling: Right-arm medium-fast

Domestic team information
- Years: Team
- 1987–1992: Berkshire

Career statistics
Competition	LA
Matches	5
Runs scored	46
Batting average	46.00
100s/50s	–/–
Top score	23
Balls bowled	252
Wickets	2
Bowling average	77.50
5 wickets in innings	–
10 wickets in match	–
Best bowling	1/39
Catches/stumpings	–/–
- Source: Cricinfo, 26 September 2010

Mark Gregory Stear (born 8 December 1958) is a former English cricketer. Stear was a right-handed batsman who bowled right-arm medium-fast. He was born at Kensington, London.

Stear made his Minor Counties Championship debut for Berkshire in 1987 against Cornwall. From 1987 to 1992, he represented the county in 38 Minor Counties Championship matches, the last of which came in the 1992 Championship when Berkshire played Cheshire. Stear also played in the MCCA Knockout Trophy for Berkshire. His debut in that competition came in 1988 when Berkshire played Oxfordshire. From 1988 to 1991, he represented the county in 5 Trophy matches, the last of which came when Berkshire played Herefordshire in the 1991 MCCA Knockout Trophy.

Additionally, he also played List-A matches for Berkshire. His List-A debut for the county came against Yorkshire in the 1988 NatWest Trophy. From 1988 to 1992, he represented the county in 5 List-A matches. His final List-A match came when Berkshire played Derbyshire in the 1992 NatWest Trophy, which was played at County Ground, Derby. In his 5 matches, he scored 46 run at a batting average of 46.00, with a high score of 23. With the ball he took 2 wickets at a bowling average of 77.50, with best figures of 1/39.
