= Phil Neale =

English sportsman

Personal information
- Full name: Phillip Anthony Neale
- Born: 5 June 1954 (age 72); Scunthorpe, Lincolnshire
- Batting: Right-handed
- Bowling: Right-arm medium

Domestic team information
- Years: Team
- 1974–1975: Lincolnshire
- 1975–1992: Worcestershire

Career statistics
Competition	First-class	List A
Matches	354	339
Runs scored	17,445	7,253
Batting average	36.49	30.22
100s/50s	28/89	2/32
Top score	167	128
Balls bowled	472	50
Wickets	2	2
Bowling average	184.50	25.00
5 wickets in innings	0	0
10 wickets in match	0	0
Best bowling	1/15	2/46
Catches/stumpings	134/–	92/–
- Source: CricInfo, 11 May 2020
Association football career
- Height: 5 ft 10 in (1.78 m)
- Position: Left back
Senior career*
Years	Team	Apps	(Gls)
–1974	Lincoln United		
1974–1985	Lincoln City	335	(22)
1986–1987	Worcester City		
- Gloucester City
- * Club domestic league appearances and goals

Phillip Anthony Neale OBE (born 5 June 1954) is an English former first-class cricketer who played for Worcestershire County Cricket Club, captaining the team to success in the County Championship in 1988 and 1989. He also played association football for Lincoln City, Scunthorpe United, Worcester City and Gloucester City. From 2000 to 2020 he worked as Operations Manager for the England cricket team.

Neale started his career in the Lincolnshire County Cricket league, making his debut for Appleby Frodinham's first XI in the premier league at just 14 years old. He continued to play for Appleby Frodingham for 4 seasons before leaving to join the Worcester set up in 1972. He made his Lincolnshire debut in 1972, playing 5 minor county championship matches for the side before moving to Worcester full time.

Neale was a right-handed middle order batsman who scored more than 900 runs in his first full season of first-class cricket for Worcestershire in 1976, and was then a fixture in the side for the next 15 seasons, scoring 1,000 runs in a season eight times and exceeding 900 in five others. His sole representative appearance was for England A against Pakistan when they toured England. But from 1982, he was county captain, and Worcestershire achieved considerable success under his leadership in the late 1980s. The county won the Sunday League in 1987 and 1988 and the County Championship in 1988 and 1989.

Neale's captaincy and contacts were a factor in attracting big name cricketers to Worcester. He played soccer professionally at Scunthorpe United with the England all-rounder Ian Botham, and when Botham fell out with Somerset, he joined Worcestershire. Botham was followed by a fellow England player, the fast bowler Graham Dilley, and Worcestershire also took on the Zimbabwean Graeme Hick, who later qualified for England. Neale's success in drawing team performances from a side not lacking in personalities won him nomination as a Wisden Cricketer of the Year in 1989.

Following his retirement in 1992 he has been prominent as a coach and team manager at both County (Northamptonshire and Warwickshire) and national levels (England 1999-2020). In all matches, he scored more than 17,000 runs at an average of almost 36.50 runs per innings.

He announced his retirement as the England Cricket operations manager after 21 years on 1 November 2020.

== Football career ==
Having previously played for Scunthorpe United's reserve side, Neale joined Lincoln United during his second year at the University of Leeds. He was part of the Lincoln United side that won Division One of the Yorkshire Football League in 1974, alongside reaching the quarter-finals of the FA Vase. He joined Lincoln City in summer 1974, and made 335 league appearances for the club before leaving in 1985. He was part of the Lincoln City sides that won promotion to the Third Division in both 1976 and 1981.

Neale later made 14 appearances for Worcester City during the 1986–87 season, and also played for Gloucester City.

== Honours ==
Lincoln City

- Football League Group Cup runner-up: 1982–83

Sporting positions
Preceded by Glenn Turner	Worcestershire County Cricket Captain; 1982–1991	Succeeded by Tim Curtis
