= Christopher Stockdale =

English cricketer

Personal information
- Full name: Christopher James Stockdale
- Born: 15 May 1965 (age 61); Carlisle, Cumberland, England
- Batting: Right-handed
- Bowling: Right arm off break

Domestic team information
- Years: Team
- 1988–1989: Minor Counties
- 1981–2000: Cumberland

Career statistics
Competition	List A
Matches	10
Runs scored	147
Batting average	14.50
100s/50s	–/1
Top score	51
Balls bowled	–
Wickets	–
Bowling average	–
5 wickets in innings	–
10 wickets in match	–
Best bowling	–
Catches/stumpings	–/–
- Source: Cricinfo, 26 March 2011

Christopher James Stockdale (born 15 May 1965) is a former English cricketer. Stockdale was a right-handed batsman who bowled right-arm medium pace. He was born in Carlisle, Cumberland and grew up in Penrith, Cumberland.

Stockdale made his debut for Cumberland in the 1981 Minor Counties Championship against Durham. He played Minor counties cricket for Cumberland from 1981 to 2000, including 77 Minor Counties Championship and 15 MCCA Knockout Trophy matches. In his time with Cumberland, Stockdale played five List A matches for the county in the NatWest Trophy, the last of which came in the 1992 competition against Essex. Stockdale also represented the Minor Counties cricket team in five List A matches in the 1988 and 1989 Benson and Hedges Cup. Stockdale played a total of ten List A matches, scoring 147 runs at a batting average of 14.70. His only half century came for Cumberland against Worcestershire in 1988.

He had previously played Second XI cricket for the Nottinghamshire Second XI., Middlesex Second XI and Warwickshire Second XI.

Stockdale also had an extensive career as a club professional and played in England, Wales, The Netherlands, South Africa and Australia. He also worked for the Isle of Man Association as their National Coach/Cricket Development Officer and represented the Island in the Four Islands Tournament in Guernsey in 2004.
