= Roland Butcher =

English cricketer (born 1953)

Personal information
- Full name: Roland Orlando Butcher
- Born: 14 October 1953 (age 73); Saint Philip, Barbados
- Batting: Right-handed
- Bowling: Legbreak

Domestic team information
- Years: Team
- 1974–1990: Middlesex
- 1974/75: Barbados
- 1982/83: Tasmania
- 1991: Suffolk

Head coaching information
- Years: Team
- 2000–2001: Bermuda

Career statistics
Competition	Test	ODI	FC	LA
Matches	3	3	277	273
Runs scored	71	58	12,021	4,899
Batting average	14.20	19.33	31.22	22.26
100s/50s	0/0	0/1	17/65	1/27
Top score	32	52	197	100
Balls bowled	–	–	307	26
Wickets	–	–	4	1
Bowling average	–	–	45.50	39.00
5 wickets in innings	–	–	0	0
10 wickets in match	–	–	0	0
Best bowling	–	–	2/37	1/18
Catches/stumpings	3/–	0/–	290/1	84/–
- Source: CricketArchive, 29 July 2020

Roland Orlando Butcher (born 14 October 1953) is a former cricket player and coach, who played for England in three Test matches and three One Day Internationals from 1980 to 1981. He is recognised as being the first black cricketer to represent England. His brief international career was somewhat overshadowed by the death of Ken Barrington, and the 'Jackman affair'.

== Life and career ==
A cousin of Basil, Roland Butcher had come to the United Kingdom at the age of thirteen from his native Barbados. He was an aggressive middle-order batsman, who represented Middlesex between 1974 and 1990. He "secured his place in history when he became the first black player to represent England, making his Test debut at Bridgetown in 1980-81".

Butcher came to prominence during Middlesex's successes in 1980 when they won the County Championship and the Gillette Cup, impressing with a rapid half-century in the final of the latter. He had actually made his England debut two weeks earlier, impressing with another half-century on his one-day international debut against Australia. He struggled more however on the 1980–81 tour against the West Indies who had the most powerful bowling line-up in the world at the time and did not play for England again.

In 1983, "he suffered a sickening injury which threatened his eyesight when struck by George Ferris", but managed to recuperate and return to the sport. He continued to enjoy success with Middlesex, winning the County Championship again in 1982 and 1985, and featuring in victories in the finals of the NatWest Trophy in 1984 and 1988, and the Benson and Hedges Cup in 1983. In 1987, he won the Walter Lawrence Trophy for recording the fastest century of the season (in terms of balls faced) against Sussex.

Butcher initially agreed to join a rebel tour of South Africa in 1989, led by his county captain Mike Gatting. However, "he withdrew when media reaction threatened the success of his benefit". As one of only two black players initially named on the tour (alongside Philip DeFreitas, who also withdrew), in the light of the South African system of apartheid, Butcher bore the brunt of much adverse comment. He later stated: "I was surprised. I thought there might be opposition but the depth of feeling was amazing. …I had to do a lot of negotiating to get out of the contract and it cost me a lot of money in legal fees. I know I did the right thing though."

Butcher retired from playing professional cricket in 1990, also a season in which Middlesex won the County Championship, although Butcher featured in the side little that year. In 1994, he was involved in an end-of-season venture called Cricket Legends which was not a financial success. More successfully, Butcher also took up coaching. He was interviewed for head coach of the West Indies in 2000, but was unsuccessful, with the job going to Roger Harper. Later in the year, he was appointed head coach of Bermuda, replacing previous part-time coach Allan Douglas. His first major engagement as coach was the 2000–01 Red Stripe Bowl. Butcher either left or was removed from his position only months before the 2001 ICC Trophy, and replaced by Mark Harper. In November 2004, he was appointed director of sports at the Cave Hill, Barbados, campus of the University of West Indies.

On 31 October 2022, Butcher was bestowed with the Freedom of the City of London. He was later appointed, in late December 2022, as a selector on the West Indies' Men's senior and youth team selection panels.
