= Trevor Butler (cricketer) =

English cricketer

Personal information
- Full name: Trevor Butler
- Born: 6 December 1958 (age 67); Northampton, Northamptonshire, England
- Batting: Right-handed

Domestic team information
- Years: Team
- 1986–1990: Buckinghamshire

Career statistics
Competition	List A
Matches	4
Runs scored	79
Batting average	19.75
100s/50s	–/–
Top score	44
Balls bowled	–
Wickets	–
Bowling average	–
5 wickets in innings	–
10 wickets in match	–
Best bowling	–
Catches/stumpings	–/–
- Source: Cricinfo, 4 May 2011

Trevor Butler (born 6 December 1958) is a former English cricketer. Butler was a right-handed batsman. He was born in [Northampton],

Butler made his debut for Buckinghamshire in the 1986 Minor Counties Championship against Cheshire. Butler played Minor counties cricket for Buckinghamshire from 1986 to 1990, which included 20 Minor Counties Championship matches and a single MCCA Knockout Trophy match. In 1987, he made his List A debut against Somerset in the NatWest Trophy. He played 3 further List A matches for Buckinghamshire, the last coming against Nottinghamshire in the 1990 NatWest Trophy. In his 4 List A matches, he scored 79 runs at a batting average of 19.75, with a high score of 44.

He also played Second XI cricket for the Northamptonshire Second XI in 1977.
