= 1989 Benson & Hedges Cup =

- Administrator(s): Test and County Cricket Board
- Cricket format: Limited overs cricket (55 overs per innings)
- Champions: Nottinghamshire (1st title)
- Participants: 20
- Matches: 47
- Most runs: 346 Chris Tavaré (Somerset)
- Most wickets: 17 Adrian Jones (Somerset)

The 1989 Benson & Hedges Cup was the eighteenth edition of cricket's Benson & Hedges Cup.

The competition was won by Nottinghamshire County Cricket Club.

== Fixtures and results ==
=== Group stage ===
==== Group A ====
Team	Pld	W	L	NR	A	Pts	Rp100
Essex	4	4	0	0	0	8	65.730
Kent	4	2	2	0	0	4	57.953
Sussex	4	2	2	0	0	4	57.402
Hampshire	4	1	3	0	0	2	70.909
Glamorgan	4	1	3	0	0	2	48.128

==== Group B ====
Team	Pld	W	L	NR	A	Pts	Rp100
Gloucestershire	4	4	0	0	0	8	67.793
Combined Universities	4	2	2	0	0	4	62.115
Middlesex	4	2	2	0	0	4	58.990
Worcestershire	4	1	3	0	0	2	57.228
Surrey	4	1	3	0	0	2	49.175

==== Group C ====
Team	Pld	W	L	NR	A	Pts	Rp100
Somerset	4	4	0	0	0	8	61.856
Nottinghamshire	4	3	1	0	0	6	55.955
Yorkshire	4	2	2	0	0	4	51.905
Derbyshire	4	1	3	0	0	2	56.114
Minor Counties	4	0	4	0	0	0	50.758

==== Group D ====
Team	Pld	W	L	NR	A	Pts	Rp100
Northamptonshire	4	3	0	1	0	7	69.864
Lancashire	4	3	1	0	0	6	61.276
Leicestershire	4	2	1	1	0	5	65.753
Warwickshire	4	1	3	0	0	2	64.793
Scotland	4	0	4	0	0	0	45.758

=== Quarter-finals ===
31 May 1989
(scorecard)

Lancashire; 246/9 (55 overs)	v	Essex; 250/7 (52.1 overs)
Neil Fairbrother 47; John Stephenson 3/37 (9 overs)		Mark Waugh 93; Wasim Akram 4/54 (11 overs)

Essex won by 3 wickets
County Ground, Chelmsford
Umpires: John Hampshire & Don Oslear
Player of the match: Mark Waugh (Essex)

31 May 1989
(scorecard)

Nottinghamshire; 222/6 (55 overs)	v	Gloucestershire; 217 all out (54.3 overs)
Chris Broad 106; Kevin Curran 4/41 (11 overs)		Bill Athey 54; Eddie Hemmings 4/47 (10.3 overs)

Nottinghamshire won by 5 runs
County Ground, Bristol
Umpires: David Evans & Alan Whitehead
Player of the match: Chris Broad (Nottinghamshire)

31 May 1989
(scorecard)

Kent; 208/8 (55 overs)	v	Northamptonshire; 187/8 (55 overs)
Mark Benson 55; Nick Cook 3/35 (11 overs)		Geoff Cook 46; Richard Ellison 3/45 (11 overs)

Kent won by 21 runs
County Ground, Northampton
Umpires: Barrie Leadbeater & Kevin Lyons
Player of the match: Richard Ellison (Kent)

31 May 1989
(scorecard)

Somerset; 252/6 (55 overs)	v	Combined Universities; 249/9 (55 overs)
Peter Roebuck 102; Michael Atherton 4/42 (9 overs)		Nasser Hussain 118; Peter Roebuck 2/19 (4 overs)

Somerset won by 3 runs
County Ground, Taunton
Umpires: Barry Dudleston & Ray Julian
Player of the match: Nasser Hussain (Combined Universities)

=== Semi-finals ===
14 June 1989
(scorecard)

Nottinghamshire; 296/6 (55 overs)	v	Kent; 227 all out (48.4 overs)
Tim Robinson 80; Chris Cowdrey 2/45 (11 overs)		Mark Benson 65; Andy Afford 4/38 (11 overs)

Nottinghamshire won by 69 runs
Trent Bridge, Nottingham
Umpires: Mervyn Kitchen & Roy Palmer
Player of the match: Andy Afford (Nottinghamshire)

14 June 1989
(scorecard)

Essex; 293/5 (55 overs)	v	Somerset; 289 all out (55 overs)
Paul Prichard 73; Peter Roebuck 2/42 (11 overs)		Chris Tavaré 104*; Neil Foster 3/56 (11 overs)

Essex won by 4 runs
County Ground, Taunton
Umpires: David Constant & Kevin Lyons
Player of the match: Chris Tavaré (Somerset)

=== Final ===
15 July 1989
(scorecard)

Essex; 243/7 (55 overs)	v	Nottinghamshire; 244/7 (55 overs)
Alan Lilley 95*; Kevin Evans 2/28 (11 overs)		Tim Robinson 86; John Lever 2/43 (11 overs)

Nottinghamshire won by 3 wickets
Lord's, London
Umpires: Ken Palmer & David Shepherd
Player of the match: Tim Robinson (Nottinghamshire)

== See also ==
Benson & Hedges Cup
