= Ricky Bartlett (cricketer) =

English cricketer

Personal information
- Full name: Richard James Bartlett
- Born: 8 October 1966 (age 60); Taunton, Somerset, England
- Batting: Right-handed
- Bowling: Right-arm off break
- Role: Batsman, occasional wicketkeeper

Domestic team information
- Years: Team
- 1986–1992: Somerset

Career statistics
Competition	First-class	List A
Matches	51	60
Runs scored	1,856	1,251
Batting average	24.42	21.94
100s/50s	2/8	0/8
Top score	117*	85
Balls bowled	180	0
Wickets	4	0
Bowling average	36.25	–
5 wickets in innings	0	–
10 wickets in match	0	–
Best bowling	1/9	–
Catches/stumpings	35/0	25/0
- Source: Cricinfo, 20 August 2009

Richard James Bartlett (born 8 October 1966) is a former English cricketer who played 51 first-class and 60 one day matches for Somerset between 1985 and 1992. A right-hand bat and occasional right-arm off break bowler, Bartlett scored 1,856 first-class runs at 24.42 with two centuries, and 1,251 one day runs at 21.94 and a best of 85. He also took four wickets at 36.25.

In July 2007, Bartlett completed a charity golf challenge in which he played a round at every course in New Zealand over the period of a year.
