= Chris Penn (cricketer) =

English cricketer (born 1963)

Personal information
- Full name: Christopher Penn
- Born: 19 June 1963 (age 63); Dover, Kent
- Batting: Left-handed
- Bowling: Right arm fast-medium
- Role: Bowler

Domestic team information
- Years: Team
- 1982–1994: Kent
- FC debut: 29 May 1982 Kent v Somerset
- Last FC: 25 June 1994 Kent v South Africans
- LA debut: 16 May 1982 Kent v Glamorgan
- Last LA: 1 August 1993 Kent v Leicestershire

Career statistics
Competition	First-class	List A
Matches	128	99
Runs scored	2,048	359
Batting average	18.61	9.97
100s/50s	1/6	0/0
Top score	115	40
Balls bowled	18,611	4,483
Wickets	296	104
Bowling average	33.24	31.88
5 wickets in innings	12	0
10 wickets in match	0	0
Best bowling	7/70	4/15
Catches/stumpings	56/–	21/–
- Source: CricInfo, 20 May 2012

Christopher Penn (born 19 June 1963) is a retired English professional cricketer. Born in Dover, from 1974 to 1981 Penn was educated at Dover Grammar School for Boys. He played for Kent County Cricket Club from 1982 to 1994, when he was forced to retire through injury. He was subsequently awarded a testimonial in 1996.

He was named Kent's player of the year in 1988 when Kent finished second in the County Championship, taking 88 first-class wickets. After his retirement he worked for the England and Wales Cricket Board in facility development for 5 years before joining St Edmund's School, Canterbury as Head of Boy's Games in the Junior School. He also spent periods of time as specialist bowling coach to Kent and the ECB women's cricket squad under coach Paul Farbrace.

Penn worked for the Transvaal Cricket Council under Dr Ali Bacher in the early 1980s coaching cricket in the Johannesburg Townships and playing club cricket for Kohinore Crescents, and Wits University and Green Point Cricket Club in Cape Town. He was awarded a Whitbread Scholarship to Perth, Western Australia in 1985.

Penn played two Test and two One-Day International matches for England under-19s in 1982 and was a schoolboy international at under-15 and under-17 level. His uncle Fred Durrant was a professional footballer for Queens Park Rangers, Brentford and Exeter City, later player-managing non-league side Dover.
