= Ashley Metcalfe =

English cricketer

Personal information
- Full name: Ashley Anthony Metcalfe
- Born: 25 December 1963 (age 62); Horsforth, Leeds, Yorkshire
- Batting: Right-handed
- Bowling: Right-arm off break

Career statistics
Competition	First-class	List A
Matches	216	241
Runs scored	11,938	7,059
Batting average	34.30	33.37
100s/50s	26/57	5/46
Top score	216*	138
Balls bowled	428	48
Wickets	4	3
Bowling average	90.50	15.66
5 wickets in innings	0	0
10 wickets in match	0	0
Best bowling	2/18	2/44
Catches/stumpings	82/–	60/–
- Source: CricketArchive, 14 April 2023

Ashley Anthony Metcalfe (born 25 December 1963) is a former first-class cricketer, who played for Yorkshire County Cricket Club from 1983 to 1995, and Nottinghamshire in 1996 and 1997. He played for Orange Free State in the 1988/89 season, and for Cumberland in the Minor Counties from 1998 to 2003.

He won his Yorkshire cap in 1986, the year he was voted the Cricket Writers' Club Young Cricketer of the Year, but despite scoring nearly 12,000 first-class runs, higher honours eluded him. He scored a half century in his only appearance for England Young Cricketers in 1983.

Metcalfe was an attacking stroke maker and, with Martyn Moxon, compiled an unbroken opening partnership of 242 against Warwickshire in a one day match at Headingley in 1990. He scored a vital 47 in Yorkshire's 1987 Benson and Hedges Cup final win over Northamptonshire at Lord's, after picking up his fourth gold award in the quarter final victory over Hampshire, for scoring an unbeaten 93.

He later played club cricket at Farsley C.C., as did the former Yorkshire captain, Phil Carrick. He currently coaches Yorkshire County Cricket Club.

His father-in-law was the former Yorkshire and England captain and manager, Ray Illingworth.
