= Andy Lloyd (cricketer) =

English cricketer (born 1956)

Personal information
- Full name: Timothy Andrew Lloyd
- Born: 5 November 1956 (age 70); Oswestry, Shropshire, England
- Batting: Left-handed
- Bowling: Right-arm medium

Career statistics
Competition	Test	ODI
Matches	1	3
Runs scored	10	101
Batting average	–	33.66
100s/50s	0/0	0/0
Top score	10*	49
Catches/stumpings	0/–	0/–
- Source: CricInfo, 1 January 2006

Timothy Andrew Lloyd (born 5 November 1956) is a former English cricketer, who played in one Test match and three One Day Internationals for England in 1984. His top score in One Day Internationals was 49 at Trent Bridge, England's top score in their only victory against the West Indies that summer. His only Test was against the same opposition, also in June 1984. After making ten runs, and batting for 33 minutes, Lloyd was hit on the head by the West Indian fast bowler, Malcolm Marshall. Despite wearing a helmet, Lloyd spent several days in hospital and did not play for the remainder of 1984. He never played for England again (although he was part of an "English Counties XI" tour of Zimbabwe that winter), and is the only Test Match opening batsman never to have been dismissed in Test cricket.

He was both club captain (1988–1992) and chairman for Warwickshire cricket before announcing his resignation on 15 November 2004 due to business difficulties. He led Warwickshire to its NatWest Trophy final victory in 1989 against Middlesex at Lord's.

Lloyd made a total of 17,211 runs in all first-class cricket, with 29 centuries, and he took 23 wickets. He is no relation to fellow cricketers David or Clive Lloyd.

== See also ==
- One Test Wonder
