= 1988 Refuge Assurance League =

- Administrator(s): Test and County Cricket Board
- Cricket format: Limited overs cricket (40 overs per innings)
- Tournament format(s): League
- Champions: Worcestershire (3rd title)
- Participants: 17
- Matches: 136
- Most runs: 573 David Turner (Hampshire)
- Most wickets: 28 Ian Greig (Surrey)

The 1988 Refuge Assurance League was the twentieth competing of what was generally known as the Sunday League. The competition was won for the third time by Worcestershire County Cricket Club.

== Standings ==
Team	Pld	W	T	L	N/R	A	Pts	R/R
Worcestershire (C)	16	12	0	3	0	1	50	5.096
Gloucestershire	16	10	0	4	0	2	44	5.246
Lancashire	16	10	0	4	1	1	44	5.113
Middlesex	16	9	0	3	3	1	44	4.927
Glamorgan	16	8	1	5	1	1	38	4.794
Surrey	16	8	1	5	1	1	38	5.088
Kent	16	7	0	6	1	2	34	4.807
Yorkshire	16	7	0	7	1	1	32	4.862
Hampshire	16	7	0	8	0	1	30	4.67
Essex	16	6	1	8	0	1	28	4.748
Warwickshire	16	6	0	8	0	2	28	4.377
Derbyshire	16	5	1	8	2	0	26	4.832
Somerset	16	6	0	9	0	1	26	4.943
Leicestershire	16	4	0	9	1	2	22	4.312
Northamptonshire	16	4	0	9	1	2	22	4.57
Sussex	16	4	2	9	0	1	22	4.573
Nottinghamshire	16	3	0	11	0	2	16	4.752
Team marked (C) finished as champions. Source: CricketArchive

== Refuge Assurance Cup ==
Following the end of the Sunday League season, the top four teams in the Sunday League competed for the Refuge Assurance Cup. Lancashire emerged as victors, defeating Worcestershire in the final.

== See also ==
Sunday League
