= 1987 Refuge Assurance League =

- Administrator(s): Test and County Cricket Board
- Cricket format: Limited overs cricket (40 overs per innings)
- Tournament format(s): League
- Champions: Worcestershire (2nd title)
- Participants: 17
- Matches: 136
- Most runs: 617 Tim Curtis (Worcestershire)
- Most wickets: 25 Courtney Walsh (Gloucs)/Neal Radford (Worcs)

The 1987 Refuge Assurance League was the nineteenth competing of what was generally known as the Sunday League. The competition was won for the second time by Worcestershire County Cricket Club.

The Worcestershire team included stars such as Ian Botham, Graeme Hick and Graham Dilley. Two other Worcs players got the batting and bowling plaudits. Opener Tim Curtis scored the most runs and fast bowler Neal Radford took the most wickets in the competition.

== Standings ==
Team	Pld	W	T	L	N/R	A	Pts	R/R
Worcestershire (C)	16	11	0	4	1	0	46	5.369
Nottinghamshire	16	9	0	3	1	3	44	4.933
Gloucestershire	16	9	1	4	2	0	42	4.769
Somerset	16	8	0	4	3	1	40	4.809
Derbyshire	16	8	1	4	1	2	40	4.786
Kent	16	8	0	5	1	2	38	5.131
Hampshire	16	6	2	6	0	2	32	4.954
Surrey	16	6	0	6	2	2	32	5.249
Lancashire	16	5	0	6	2	3	30	5.170
Middlesex	16	5	0	7	1	3	28	4.460
Northamptonshire	16	4	0	6	2	4	28	5.026
Leicestershire	16	3	0	6	3	4	26	4.902
Yorkshire	16	5	0	8	1	2	26	5.209
Essex	16	4	0	8	1	3	24	4.434
Glamorgan	16	5	0	9	0	2	24	4.609
Sussex	16	4	0	8	1	3	24	4.823
Warwickshire	16	3	0	9	0	4	20	4.496
Team marked (C) finished as champions. Source: CricketArchive

== See also ==
Sunday League
