= Kevin Lyons (cricketer) =

Welsh cricketer (born 1946)

Kevin James Lyons (born 18 December 1946 in Cardiff) is a Welsh former cricketer active from 1967 to 1977 who played for Glamorgan. He appeared in 62 first-class matches as a righthanded batsman who bowled right arm medium pace. He scored 1,673 runs with a highest score of 92 and took two wickets with a best performance of one for 36.

== Notes ==
Template:Cricket-umpire-bio-stub
