= 1989 County Championship =

English cricket tournament

- Dates: 20 April – 16 September 1989
- Administrator: England and Wales Cricket Board
- Cricket format: First-class cricket
- Tournament format: League system
- Champions: Worcestershire (5th title)
- Participants: 17
- Matches: 187
- Most runs: Jimmy Cook , (Somerset); 2,173
- Most wickets: Franklyn Stephenson, (Nottinghamshire); 91

The 1989 Britannic Assurance County Championship was the 90th officially organised running of the County Championship. Worcestershire won their second successive Championship title. A sub-standard pitch at Southchurch Park, for which Essex were docked the 25 points, cost them the Championship.

The Championship was sponsored by Britannic Assurance for the sixth time.

== Table ==
- 16 points for a win
- 8 points to each team for a tie
- 8 points to team still batting in a match in which scores finish level
- Bonus points awarded in the first 100 overs of the first innings
  - Batting: 150 runs - 1 point, 200 runs - 2 points 250 runs - 3 points, 300 runs - 4 points
  - Bowling: 3-4 wickets - 1 point, 5-6 wickets - 2 points 7-8 wickets - 3 points, 9-10 wickets - 4 points
- No bonus points awarded in a match starting with less than 8 hours' play remaining. A one-innings match is played, with the winner gaining 12 points.
- Position determined by points gained. If equal, then decided on most wins.

	Team	P	W	L	D	Bat	Bowl	Pts
1	Worcestershire	22	12	3	7	44	83	319
2	Essex	22	13	2	7	59	71	313 (Note: Essex and Nottinghamshire each lost 25 points for preparing a pitch deemed unsuitable for first-class cricket.)
3	Middlesex	22	9	2	11	50	72	266
4	Lancashire	22	8	5	9	57	65	250
5	Northamptonshire	22	7	8	7	47	63	222
6	Derbyshire	22	6	6	10	45	75	216
7	Hampshire	22	6	8	8	55	65	216
8	Warwickshire	22	5	4	13	44	75	207
9	Gloucestershire	22	6	11	5	38	70	204
10	Sussex	22	4	4	14	60	68	192
11	Nottinghamshire	22	6	6	10	54	65	190
12	Surrey	22	4	7	11	50	69	183
13	Leicestershire	22	4	8	10	43	74	181
14	Somerset	22	4	6	12	50	54	168
15	Kent	22	3	8	11	53	53	154
16	Yorkshire	22	3	9	10	41	60	149
17	Glamorgan	22	3	6	13	38	59	145
