= Chris Smith (cricketer, born 1958) =

English cricketer (born 1958)

Personal information
- Full name: Christopher Lyall Smith
- Born: 15 October 1958 (age 68); Durban, Natal, South Africa
- Nickname: Kippy
- Batting: Right-handed
- Bowling: Right arm off-break
- Relatives: Robin Smith (brother)

International information
- National side: England
- Test debut (cap 503): 11 August 1983 v New Zealand
- Last Test: 19 June 1986 v India
- ODI debut (cap 72): 18 February 1984 v New Zealand
- Last ODI: 26 March 1984 v Pakistan

Domestic team information
- Years: Team
- 1977/78–1982/83: Natal
- 1979: Glamorgan
- 1980–1991: Hampshire

Career statistics
Competition	Test	ODI	FC	LA
Matches	8	4	269	214
Runs scored	392	109	18,028	6,700
Batting average	30.15	27.25	44.40	42.40
100s/50s	0/2	0/1	47/88	11/42
Top score	91	70	217	159
Balls bowled	17	17	4,457	171
Wickets	3	2	50	10
Bowling average	13.00	14.00	53.70	11.40
5 wickets in innings	0	0	1	0
10 wickets in match	0	0	0	0
Best bowling	2/31	2/8	5/69	3/32
Catches/stumpings	5/–	0/–	176/–	39/–
- Source: CricketArchive, 18 December 2008

Christopher Lyall Smith (born 15 October 1958) is a former cricketer for Hampshire and England. He also played one match for Glamorgan in 1979, while playing in the South Wales League, and in South Africa he played for Natal B (then a first-class team).

== Life and career ==
Born on 15 October 1958 in Durban, South Africa, Smith was unable to play Test cricket for South Africa due to their exclusion from international sport because of the apartheid regime, but played for England through his parents' nationality. Ironically his opportunity was assisted by the fact that a number of alternative England opening batsmen such as Graham Gooch and Wayne Larkins were banned from international cricket after participating in a rebel tour of South Africa in 1982. However, Smith played only eight Test matches, never establishing himself in the side.

Smith had the misfortune to be dismissed first ball by Richard Hadlee on Test debut at Lord's in 1983 (although he made 43 in the second innings as England won the match), but was selected the next winter for the tour to New Zealand and Pakistan. There he made some useful contributions, including a score of 91 in Auckland. Smith also played four one-day internationals in 1984 with a highest score of 70. Smith was also an occasional off-spin bowler who took five cheap international wickets, including figures of 2–8 in a one-day international against Pakistan. After he toured Sri Lanka with an England 'B' side in 1986, his last Test came in 1986 at Leeds against India as an injury replacement for David Gower. He was dropped when Gower was fit again.

Smith was much more successful for Hampshire, enjoying a successful career with that county, scoring more than 40 first-class hundreds and helping them to win the 1988 Benson & Hedges Cup, and the 1991 NatWest Trophy (though missing the final of the latter). He was one of the Wisden Cricketers of the Year in 1984.

After he retired from first-class cricket, he settled in Western Australia, and became marketing manager of the Western Australian Cricket Association.

Chris Smith is the older brother of fellow Hampshire and England Test player Robin Smith. His brother made his England debut at Leeds, two years after Smith had played his last Test on the same ground, and went on to a more extensive international career.
