= 1988 County Championship =

English cricket tournament

- Dates: 21 April – 17 September 1988
- Administrator: England and Wales Cricket Board
- Cricket format: First-class cricket
- Tournament format: League system
- Champions: Worcestershire (4th title)
- Participants: 17
- Matches: 187
- Most runs: Graeme Hick, (Worcestershire); 2,443
- Most wickets: Franklyn Stephenson, (Nottinghamshire); 121

The 1988 Britannic Assurance County Championship was the 89th officially organised running of the County Championship. Worcestershire won the Championship title. Matches played over four days were introduced to the competition this season. Each county was scheduled to play sixteen three-day matches, one against each other county, and six four-day matches. The four-day matches were played at the start and end of the season. This resulted in a total of twenty-two games for each county, a decrease of two from the number played in 1987.

The Championship was sponsored by Britannic Assurance for the fifth time.

== Table ==
- 16 points for a win
- 8 points to each team for a tie
- 8 points to team still batting in a match in which scores finish level
- Bonus points awarded in the first 100 overs of the first innings
  - Batting: 150 runs – 1 point, 200 runs – 2 points 250 runs – 3 points, 300 runs – 4 points
  - Bowling: 3–4 wickets – 1 point, 5–6 wickets – 2 points 7–8 wickets – 3 points, 9–10 wickets – 4 points
- No bonus points awarded in a match starting with less than 8 hours' play remaining. A one-innings match is played, with the winner gaining 12 points.
- Position determined by points gained. If equal, then decided on most wins.

	Team	P	W	L	D	Bat	Bowl	Pts
1	Worcestershire	22	10	3	9	55	75	290
2	Kent	22	10	5	7	57	72	289
3	Essex	22	9	5	8	61	69	282
4	Surrey	22	7	5	10	57	72	241
5	Nottinghamshire	22	8	8	6	34	71	229
6	Warwickshire	22	6	8	8	48	74	218
7	Middlesex	22	7	3	12	49	54	215
8	Leicestershire	22	6	3	13	56	63	215
9	Lancashire	22	6	7	9	41	67	212
10	Gloucestershire	22	6	7	8	52	59	207
11	Somerset	22	5	6	11	48	65	201
12	Northamptonshire	22	5	7	10	48	71	199
13	Yorkshire	22	4	6	12	48	65	177
14	Derbyshire	22	4	3	15	53	54	171
15	Hampshire	22	4	6	12	33	69	166
16	Sussex	22	3	11	8	37	65	150
17	Glamorgan	22	1	8	12	42	53	111
