= 1989 NatWest Trophy =

- Administrator: Test and County Cricket Board
- Cricket format: Limited overs cricket (60 overs per innings)
- Tournament format: Knockout
- Champions: Warwickshire (3rd title)
- Participants: 32
- Matches: 30
- Most runs: 301 Desmond Haynes (Middlesex)
- Most wickets: 14 Allan Donald (Warwickshire)

The 1989 NatWest Trophy was the 9th NatWest Trophy. It was an English limited overs county cricket tournament which was held between 28 June and 2 September 1989. The tournament was won by Warwickshire who defeated Middlesex by 4 wickets in the final at Lord's.

== Format ==
The seventeen first-class counties, were joined by thirteen Minor Counties: Berkshire, Cambridgeshire, Cheshire, Cumberland, Dorset, Durham, Hertfordshire, Northumberland, Oxfordshire, Shropshire, Staffordshire, Suffolk and Wiltshire. The Ireland and Scotland teams also participated. Teams who won in the first round progressed to the second round. The winners in the second round then progressed to the quarter-final stage. Winners from the quarter-finals then progressed to the semi-finals from which the winners then went on to the final at Lord's which was held on 2 September 1989.

=== First round ===
28 June 1989
(scorecard)

Cambridgeshire; 202/4 (60 overs)	v	Worcestershire; 206/1 (48.1 overs)
Ian Lawrence 74; Ian Botham 2/44 (11 overs)		Tim Curtis 91*; Douglas Collard 1/29 (12 overs)

Worcestershire won by 9 wickets
The Avenue Sports Club Ground, March
Umpires: Chris Balderstone & Donald Thompsett
Player of the match: Ian Lawrence (Cambridgeshire)

28, 29 June 1989
(scorecard)

Hampshire; 306/2 (60 overs)	v	Cheshire; 159 all out (47.1 overs)
Chris Smith 159; Andrew Fox 2/48 (12 overs)		Stephen Crawley 38; Malcolm Marshall 4/40 (10.1 overs)

Hampshire won by 147 runs
Boughton Hall Cricket Club Ground, Chester
Umpires: Barrie Leadbeater & Tommy Wilson
Player of the match: Chris Smith (Hampshire)

- Match was scheduled for one day but extended to two.

28, 29 June 1989
(scorecard)

Cumberland; 84 all out (44.5 overs)	v	Lancashire; 86/6 (33.4 overs)
David Halliwell 25*; Phil DeFreitas 5/13 (10.5 overs)		Warren Hegg 26; Stephen Wall 3/24 (9 overs)

Lancashire won by 4 wickets
Netherfield Cricket Club Ground, Kendal
Umpires: Brian Harrison & Barrie Meyer
Player of the match: Phil DeFreitas (Lancashire)

- Match was scheduled for one day but extended to two.

28, 29 June 1989
(scorecard)

Derbyshire; 145 all out (56.1 overs)	v	Ireland; 82 all out (31.4 overs)
Michael Holding 32; Michael Halliday 2/11 (7 overs)		Paul Jackson 16; Ole Mortensen 6/14 (12 overs)

Derbyshire won by 63 runs
County Ground, Derby
Umpires: Barry Dudleston & Terry Spencer
Player of the match: Ole Mortensen (Derbyshire)

- Match was scheduled for one day but extended to two.

28 June 1989
(scorecard)

Middlesex; 215/7 (60 overs)	v	Durham; 161 all out (56.2 overs)
Desmond Haynes 83 (164); Johnny Johnston 2/33 (12 overs)		Paul Burn 43 (110); Simon Hughes 4/20 (10.2 overs)

Middlesex won by 54 runs
Feethams, Darlington
Umpires: Don Oslear & Jack van Geloven
Player of the match: Desmond Haynes (Middlesex)

28, 29 June 1989
(scorecard)

Glamorgan; 318/4 (60 overs)	v	Staffordshire; 151 all out (53.4 overs)
Hugh Morris 154*; David Blank 2/66 (12 overs)		Harshad Patel 63; Ravi Shastri 3/16 (12 overs)

Glamorgan won by 167 runs
Sophia Gardens, Cardiff
Umpires: Derek Dennis & David Shepherd
Player of the match: Hugh Morris (Glamorgan)

- Match was scheduled for one day but extended to two.

28 June 1989
(scorecard)

Hertfordshire; 154/7 (60 overs)	v	Nottinghamshire; 155/5 (45.3 overs)
Martin Wright 36; Andy Afford 3/32 (12 overs)		Chris Broad 63; Tim Smith 2/31 (8 overs)

Nottinghamshire won by 5 wickets
Hitchin Town Cricket Club Ground, Hitchin
Umpires: Kevin Lyons & Peter Wight
Player of the match: Chris Broad (Nottinghamshire)

28 June 1989
(scorecard)

Kent; 359/4 (60 overs)	v	Dorset; 161 all out (50.5 overs)
Roy Pienaar 90; Neil Taylor 1/65 (12 overs)		Simon Legg 66; Neil Taylor 3/29 (6.5 overs)

Kent won by 198 runs
St Lawrence Ground, Canterbury
Umpires: Allan Jones & Alan Whitehead
Player of the match: Trevor Ward (Kent)

28, 29 June 1989
(scorecard)

Surrey; 313/5 (60 overs)	v	Northumberland; 245/6 (60 overs)
David Ward 97; Adrian Dalby 3/87 (10 overs)		Stuart Tiffin 49*; Martin Bicknell 2/24 (9 overs)

Surrey won by 86 runs
Osborne Avenue, Jesmond
Umpires: Harold Rhodes & Bob White
Player of the match: David Ward (Surrey)

- Match was scheduled for one day but extended to two.

28 June 1989
(scorecard)

Gloucestershire; 269/3 (60 overs)	v	Oxfordshire; 226 all out (59.5 overs)
Ian Butcher 71; Jonathan Hartley 2/48 (12 overs)		Stuart Waterton 92; Kevin Jarvis 5/32 (10.4 overs)

Gloucestershire won by 43 runs
Christ Church Ground, Oxford
Umpires: David Constant & Vanburn Holder
Player of the match: Stuart Waterton (Oxfordshire)

28 June 1989
(scorecard)

Shropshire; 220/7 (60 overs)	v	Leicestershire; 221/4 (54.2 overs)
Mark Davies 89; Jon Agnew 2/30 (12 overs)		David Gower 101*; Philip Wormald 1/30 (9.2 overs)

Leicestershire won by 6 wickets
St George's Cricket Ground, Telford
Umpires: Peter Eele & John Hampshire
Player of the match: Mark Davies (Shropshire)

28, 29 June 1989
(scorecard)

Somerset; 276/6 (60 overs)	v	Essex; 221 all out (54.5 overs)
Peter Roebuck 102; Neil Foster 2/50 (12 overs)		Graham Gooch 94; Adrian Jones 3/32 (9.5 overs)

Somerset won by 55 runs
County Ground, Taunton
Umpires: David Evans & David Halfyard
Player of the match: Peter Roebuck (Somerset)

- Match was scheduled for one day but extended to two.

28, 29 June 1989
(scorecard)

Northamptonshire; 256/5 (60 overs)	v	Suffolk; 224 all out (59.5 overs)
Allan Lamb 103; Hedley Wright 3/29 (8 overs)		Michael McEvoy 61; Curtly Ambrose 3/31 (11.5 overs)

Northamptonshire won by 32 runs
Victory Ground, Bury St Edmunds
Umpires: Bob Duckett & John Holder
Player of the match: David Capel (Northamptonshire)

- Match was scheduled for one day but extended to two.

28, 29 June 1989
(scorecard)

Sussex; 235/8 (60 overs)	v	Berkshire; 200/6 (60 overs)
David Smith 99; Barry Jackson 3/38 (12 overs)		David Mercer 45; Andrew Clarke 3/41 (12 overs)

Sussex won by 35 runs
County Ground, Hove
Umpires: Basher Hassan & Roy Palmer
Player of the match: David Smith (Sussex)

- Match was scheduled for one day but extended to two.

28, 29 June 1989
(scorecard)

Warwickshire; 270/4 (60 overs)	v	Wiltshire; 84 all out (30 overs)
Geoff Humpage 59; David Pike 2/40 (12 overs)		Jeremy Thompson 34; Allan Donald 5/12 (7 overs)

Warwickshire won by 186 runs
Edgbaston, Birmingham
Umpires: Sam Cook & Ray Julian
Player of the match: Allan Donald (Warwickshire)

- Match was scheduled for one day but extended to two.

28, 29 June 1988
(scorecard)

Scotland; 210/3 (60 overs)	v	Yorkshire; 212/7 (58.5 overs)
Ian Philip 73; Arnie Sidebottom 1/27 (12 overs)		David Byas 54; David Snodgrass 2/8 (2 overs)

Yorkshire won by 3 wickets
Headingley, Leeds
Umpires: Jack Bond & Ken Palmer
Player of the match: Omar Henry (Scotland)

- Match was scheduled for one day but extended to two.

=== Second round ===
12 July 1989
(scorecard)

Glamorgan; 189 all out (59.4 overs)	v	Hampshire; 190/3 (57 overs)
Hugh Morris 53; Cardigan Connor 3/43 (11.4 overs)		Robin Smith 69*; Geoff Holmes 1/22 (4 overs)

Hampshire won by 7 wickets
Sophia Gardens, Cardiff
Umpires: Jack Bond & Barrie Meyer
Player of the match: Robin Smith (Hampshire)

12 July 1989
(scorecard)

Gloucestershire; 174/7 (60 overs)	v	Lancashire; 179/9 (60 overs)
Kevin Curran 47; Paul Allott 4/31 (12 overs)		Gehan Mendis 46; Kevin Jarvis 3/25 (12 overs)

Lancashire won by 1 wicket
The Royal & Sun Alliance County Ground, Bristol
Umpires: John Harris & Nigel Plews
Player of the match: Paul Allott (Lancashire)

12 July 1989
(scorecard)

Warwickshire; 272/5 (60 overs)	v	Kent; 223 all out (57.4 overs)
Alvin Kallicharran 93*; Richard Ellison 2/55 (12 overs)		Mark Benson 64; Tim Munton 3/36 (11 overs)

Warwickshire won by 49 runs
St Lawrence Ground, Canterbury
Umpires: David Constant & Ken Palmer
Player of the match: Alvin Kallicharran (Warwickshire)

12 July 1989
(scorecard)

Middlesex; 203/7 (60 overs)	v	Nottinghamshire; 167 all out (54.4 overs)
Paul Downton 69; Kevin Saxelby 3/70 (12 overs)		Paul Johnson 65; Ricardo Ellcock 4/43 (10 overs)

Middlesex won by 36 runs
Uxbridge Cricket Club Ground, Uxbridge
Umpires: Mervyn Kitchen & David Shepherd
Player of the match: Paul Downton (Middlesex)

12 July 1989
(scorecard)

Somerset; 210 all out (55.4 overs)	v	Northamptonshire; 211/5 (57 overs)
Chris Tavaré 79*; Mark Robinson 4/32 (11.4 overs)		Rob Bailey 86*; Daren Foster 1/15 (8 overs)

Northamptonshire won by 5 wickets
County Ground, Taunton
Umpires: Chris Balderstone & Ray Julian
Player of the match: Rob Bailey (Northamptonshire)

12 July 1989
(scorecard)

Surrey; 256/4 (60 overs)	v	Yorkshire; 255/9 (60 overs)
Darren Bicknell 135*; Martyn Moxon 2/34 (11 overs)		Martyn Moxon 59; Martin Bicknell 4/49 (12 overs)

Surrey won by 1 run
The Oval, London
Umpires: Roy Palmer & Donald Thompsett
Player of the match: Darren Bicknell (Surrey)

12 July 1989
(scorecard)

Sussex; 300/2 (60 overs)	v	Leicestershire; 232 all out (55.4 overs)
Paul Parker 87*; Peter Willey 1/31 (12 overs)		Peter Willey 89; Tony Dodemaide 4/37 (10.4 overs)

Sussex won by 68 runs
County Ground, Hove
Umpires: Peter Eele & Allan Jones
Player of the match: Paul Parker (Sussex)

12 July 1989
(scorecard)

Worcestershire; 278/7 (60 overs)	v	Derbyshire; 240 all out (56 overs)
Steve Rhodes 61; Michael Holding 2/20 (12 overs)		Bruce Roberts 64*; Ian Botham 4/62 (12 overs)

Worcestershire won by 38 runs
New Road, Worcester
Umpires: John Hampshire & Basher Hassan
Player of the match: Ian Botham (Worcestershire)

=== Quarter-finals ===
2 August 1989
(scorecard)

Middlesex; 266/3 (60 overs)	v	Sussex; 188 all out (57 overs)
Mike Gatting 132*; Alan Hansford 2/48 (12 overs)		Alan Wells 58; John Emburey 3/11 (12 overs)

Middlesesx won by 78 runs
Lord's, London
Umpires: David Evans & Alan Whitehead
Player of the match: Mike Gatting (Middlesex)

2 August 1989
(scorecard)

Northamptonshire; 191/8 (60 overs)	v	Warwickshire; 194/7 (59.4 overs)
David Capel 54; Allan Donald 4/26 (12 overs)		Andy Lloyd 57; Greg Thomas 3/54 (11 overs)

Warwickshire won by 3 wickets
County Ground, Northampton
Umpires: John Holder & Bob White
Player of the match: Andy Lloyd (Warwickshire)

2 August 1989
(scorecard)

Surrey; 228/8 (60 overs)	v	Hampshire; 229/5 (60 overs)
Ian Greig 75; Cardigan Connor 3/61 (12 overs)		Robin Smith 125*; Martin Bicknell 2/32 (12 overs)

Hampshire won by 5 wickets
The Oval, London
Umpires: Don Oslear & Peter Wight
Player of the match: Robin Smith (Hampshire)

2 August 1989
(scorecard)

Lancashire; 237/9 (60 overs)	v	Worcestershire; 241/3 (52.2 overs)
Mike Watkinson 62; Ian Botham 5/51 (12 overs)		Graeme Hick 90*; Jack Simmons 1/44 (12 overs)

Lancashire won by 7 wickets
New Road, Worcester
Umpires: Dickie Bird & Mervyn Kitchen
Player of the match: Martin Weston (Worcestershire)

=== Semi-finals ===
16 August 1989
(scorecard)

Middlesex; 267/7 (60 overs)	v	Hampshire; 264/7 (60 overs)
John Carr 83; Cardigan Connor 2/62 (12 overs)		Chris Smith 114; John Emburey 2/38 (12 overs)

Middlesex won by 3 runs
County Ground, Southampton
Umpires: Barry Dudleston & Alan Whitehead
Player of the match: Chris Smith (Hampshire)

16 August 1989
(scorecard)

Warwickshire; 220/9 (60 overs)	v	Worcestershire; 120 all out (45 overs)
Asif Din 94*; Steven McEwan 3/51 (11 overs)		Damian D'Oliveira 32; Paul Smith 3/39 (11 overs)

Warwickshire won by 100 runs
Edgbaston, Birmingham
Umpires: John Harris & Barrie Leadbeater
Player of the match: Asif Din (Warwickshire)

=== Final ===
2 September 1989
(scorecard)

Middlesex; 210/5 (60 overs)	v	Warwickshire; 211/6 (59.4 overs)
Desmond Haynes 50 (99); Dermot Reeve 1/27 (12 overs)		Dermot Reeve 42 (73); Angus Fraser 2/30 (12 overs)

Warwickshire won by 4 wickets
Lord's, London
Umpires: Dickie Bird & Nigel Plews
Player of the match: Dermot Reeve (Warwickshire)
