= 1985 NatWest Trophy =

- Administrator: Test and County Cricket Board
- Cricket format: Limited overs cricket (60 overs per innings)
- Tournament format: Knockout
- Champions: Essex (1st title)
- Participants: 32
- Matches: 31
- Most runs: 417 Tim Robinson (Nottinghamshire)
- Most wickets: 11 Derek Pringle (Essex)

The 1985 NatWest Trophy was the 5th NatWest Trophy. It was an English limited overs county cricket tournament which was held between 3 July and 7 September 1985. The tournament was won by Essex who defeated Nottinghamshire by 1 run in the final at Lord's.

== Format ==
The seventeen first-class counties, were joined by thirteen Minor Counties: Bedfordshire, Berkshire, Buckinghamshire, Cheshire, Cumberland, Devon, Durham, Hertfordshire, Norfolk, Oxfordshire, Shropshire, Staffordshire and Suffolk. The Ireland and Scotland teams also participated. Teams who won in the first round progressed to the second round. The winners in the second round then progressed to the quarter-final stage. Winners from the quarter-finals then progressed to the semi-finals from which the winners then went on to the final at Lord's which was held on 7 September 1985. Durham repeated their feat of 1973, in being a minor county defeating a first class county, when they saw off Derbyshire in round one.

=== First round ===
3 July 1985
(scorecard)

Gloucestershire; 268/6 (60 overs)	v	Bedfordshire; 127 all out (54 overs)
Bill Athey 72 (107); Brian Marvin 2/56 (11 overs)		John Wake 37 (51); Courtney Walsh 2/7 (7 overs)

Gloucestershire won by 141 runs
Wardown Park, Luton
Umpires: Peter Eele & Kevin Lyons
Player of the match: Bill Athey (Gloucestershire)

3 July 1985
(scorecard)

Cheshire; 159/7 (60 overs)	v	Yorkshire; 160/0 (44.1 overs)
Keith Teasdale 46; Graham Stevenson 2/17 (12 overs)		Martyn Moxon 82*

Yorkshire won by 10 wickets
Oxton Cricket Club Ground, Oxton
Umpires: Jack Birkenshaw & Clive Smith
Player of the match: Martyn Moxon (Yorkshire)

3 July 1985
(scorecard)

Derbyshire; 171 all out (58.4 overs)	v	Durham; 172/3 (55.4 overs)
Kim Barnett 53 (99); Stephen Greensword 3/20 (12 overs)		Neil Riddell 49* (111); Michael Holding 1/36 (12 overs)

Durham won by 7 wickets
County Ground, Derby
Umpires: John Harris & Don Oslear
Player of the match: Stephen Greensword (Durham)

3 July 1985
(scorecard)

Essex; 307/6 (60 overs)	v	Oxfordshire; 81 all out (43.2 overs)
Paul Prichard 94; Rupert Evans 1/41 (12 overs)		Geoffrey Ford 18; Derek Pringle 5/12 (12 overs)

Essex won by 226 runs
County Ground, Chelmsford
Umpires: Arthur Jepson & Harold Rhodes
Player of the match: Derek Pringle (Essex)

3 July 1985
(scorecard)

Hampshire; 339/4 (60 overs)	v	Berkshire; 152 all out (58.5 overs)
Paul Terry 165*; Lloyd Sluman 1/53 (12 overs)		David Gorman 28; Chris Smith 3/32 (12 overs)

Hampshire won by 187 runs
County Ground, Southampton
Umpires: John Jameson & Donald Thompsett
Player of the match: Paul Terry (Hampshire)

3 July 1985
(scorecard)

Worcestershire; 241/7 (60 overs)	v	Hertfordshire; 183 all out (57.5 overs)
Phil Neale 73; William Merry 2/25 (12 overs)		Peter Neal 52; Dipak Patel 2/22 (12 overs)

Worcestershire won by 58 runs
Hitchin Town Cricket Club Ground, Hitchin
Umpires: David Constant & Terry Spencer
Player of the match: Peter Neal (Hertfordshire)

3 July 1985
(scorecard)

Surrey; 293/8 (60 overs)	v	Kent; 296/4 (58 overs)
Grahame Clinton 146; Chris Cowdrey 3/74 (12 overs)		Simon Hinks 95; Andrew Needham 2/55 (11 overs)

Kent won by 6 wickets
St Lawrence Ground, Canterbury
Umpires: Lloyd Budd & Alan Whitehead
Player of the match: Simon Hinks (Kent)

3 July 1985
(scorecard)

Middlesex; 283/9 (60 overs)	v	Cumberland; 152 all out (53.3 overs)
Wilf Slack 98; David Halliwell 4/57 (12 overs)		John Moyes 37; Phil Edmonds 4/39 (12 overs)

Middlesex won by 131 runs
Uxbridge Cricket Club Ground, Uxbridge
Umpires: Sam Cook & Mervyn Kitchen
Player of the match: Wilf Slack (Middlesex)

3 July 1985
(scorecard)

Leicestershire; 213/8 (60 overs)	v	Norfolk; 73 all out (46.3 overs)
David Gower 41; David Thomas 3/50 (9 overs)		Robin Huggins 29; Les Taylor 4/14 (11 overs)

Leicestershire won by 140 runs
County Ground, Norwich
Umpires: Derek Dennis & Bob White
Player of the match: Les Taylor (Leicestershire)

3 July 1985
(scorecard)

Nottinghamshire; 243/7 (60 overs)	v	Staffordshire; 147/8 (60 overs)
Paul Johnson 101*; Andrew Webster 4/38 (12 overs)		Graham Warner 51; Kevin Saxelby 3/19 (12 overs)

Nottinghamshire won by 96 runs
Trent Bridge, Nottingham
Umpires: Brian Harrison & Nigel Plews
Player of the match: Paul Johnson (Nottinghamshire)

3 July 1985
(scorecard)

Northamptonshire; 270/6 (60 overs)	v	Shropshire; 170 all out (54.2 overs)
Geoff Cook 130; Andrew Barnard 4/47 (12 overs)		John Foster 63; Richard Williams 3/35 (12 overs)

Northamptonshire won by 100 runs
St George's Cricket Ground, Telford
Umpires: Roy Palmer & Tommy Wilson
Player of the match: Geoff Cook (Northamptonshire)

3 July 1985
(scorecard)

Buckinghamshire; 138 all out (47.4 overs)	v	Somerset; 139/3 (41.3 overs)
Michael Milton 33; Joel Garner 5/18 (8.4 overs)		Nigel Felton 72*; Michael Milton 1/13 (6 overs)

Somerset won by 7 wickets
County Ground, Taunton
Umpires: Barry Dudleston & David Shepherd
Player of the match: Joel Garner (Somerset)

3 July 1985
(scorecard)

Lancashire; 233/6 (60 overs)	v	Suffolk; 133/8 (60 overs)
Neil Fairbrother 52*; Peter Hayes 2/20 (12 overs)		Michael McEvoy 21; Steve O'Shaughnessy 3/28 (12 overs)

Lancashire won by 100 runs
Victory Ground, Bury St Edmunds
Umpires: Bob Duckett & Ray Julian
Player of the match: Neil Fairbrother (Lancashire)

3 July 1985
(scorecard)

Sussex; 283/6 (60 overs)	v	Ireland; 39 all out (26.4 overs)
Paul Parker 109; John Elder 2/69 (10 overs)		Simon Corlett 11; Garth Le Roux 5/7 (7 overs)

Sussex won by 244 runs
County Ground, Hove
Umpires: Allan Jones & Peter Wight
Player of the match: Paul Parker (Sussex)

3 July 1985
(scorecard)

Devon; 221/7 (60 overs)	v	Warwickshire; 222/7 (53.2 overs)
Kevin Rice 107; Alvin Kallicharran 3/41 (12 overs)		Alvin Kallicharran 66; John Tierney 3/47 (12 overs)

Warwickshire won by 3 wickets
Edgbaston, Birmingham
Umpires: John Hampshire & Barrie Meyer
Player of the match: Kevin Rice (Devon)

3 July 1985
(scorecard)

Scotland; 137 all out (60 overs)	v	Glamorgan; 141/2 (39.4 overs)
Richard Swan 27; Geoff Holmes 5/24 (12 overs)		Alan Jones 60*; Jack Ker 1/31 (10 overs)

Glamorgan won by 8 wickets
Myreside, Edinburgh
Umpires: John Holder & Stan Levison
Player of the match: Geoff Holmes (Glamorgan)

=== Second round ===
17 July 1985
(scorecard)

Essex; 214 all out (60 overs)	v	Middlesex; 130 all out (50 overs)
Brian Hardie 60; John Emburey 3/41 (12 overs)		Wilf Slack 32; Derek Pringle 5/23 (9 overs)

Essex won by 84 runs
County Ground, Chelmsford
Umpires: Barry Dudleston & Peter Wight
Player of the match: Graham Gooch (Essex)

17 July 1985
(scorecard)

Sussex; 136 all out (51.3 overs)	v	Glamorgan; 140/6 (48.5 overs)
Colin Wells 35; Greg Thomas 5/17 (7 overs)		Rodney Ontong 30*; Tony Pigott 2/37 (12 overs)

Glamorgan won by 4 wickets
Sophia Gardens, Cardiff
Umpires: Barrie Leadbeater & Roy Palmer
Player of the match: Greg Thomas (Glamorgan)

17 July 1985
(scorecard)

Gloucestershire; 277/8 (60 overs)	v	Northamptonshire; 240 all out (56.3 overs)
Brian Davison 81; Wayne Larkins 2/38 (12 overs)		Wayne Larkins 75; Kevin Curran 4/34 (10 overs)

Gloucestershire won by 37 runs
The Royal & Sun Alliance County Ground, Bristol
Umpires: John Harris & Allan Jones
Player of the match: Kevin Curran (Gloucestershire)

17 July 1985
(scorecard)

Leicestershire; 212/6 (60 overs)	v	Hampshire; 213/6 (59.1 overs)
Peter Willey 52; Mark Nicholas 2/40 (12 overs)		Gordon Greenidge 67; Nigel Briers 1/8 (2 overs)

Hampshire won by 4 wickets
County Ground, Southampton
Umpires: Barrie Meyer & David Shepherd
Player of the match: Paul Terry (Hampshire)

17 July 1985
(scorecard)

Kent; 248/7 (60 overs)	v	Durham; 169 all out (59.1 overs)
Mark Benson 78 (134); Peter Kippax 3/32 (12 overs)		Stephen Greensword 34 (98); Derek Underwood 3/26 (12 overs)

Kent won by 79 runs
St Lawrence Ground, Canterbury
Umpires: Sam Cook & Kevin Lyons
Player of the match: Mark Benson (Kent)

17, 18 July 1985
(scorecard)

Worcestershire; 312/5 (60 overs)	v	Lancashire; 298 all out (59 overs)
David Smith 109; Soren Henriksen 2/51 (10 overs)		Clive Lloyd 91; Kapil Dev 5/52 (12 overs)

Worcestershire won by 14 runs
Old Trafford, Manchester
Umpires: Ray Julian & Bob White
Player of the match: Clive Lloyd (Lancashire)

- Match was scheduled for one day but extended to two.

17 July 1985
(scorecard)

Nottinghamshire; 251/5 (60 overs)	v	Warwickshire; 165 all out (51.2 overs)
Tim Robinson 98*; Dean Hoffman 2/56 (12 overs)		Dennis Amiss 64; Kevin Cooper 4/49 (11.2 overs)

Nottinghamshire won by 86 runs
Trent Bridge, Nottingham
Umpires: John Hampshire & Nigel Plews
Player of the match: Tim Robinson (Nottinghamshire)

17, 18 July 1985
(scorecard)

Yorkshire; 208/8 (60 overs)	v	Somerset; 209/6 (48.1 overs)
Neil Hartley 69; Colin Dredge 3/28 (8 overs)		Viv Richards 87*; Stuart Fletcher 3/34 (12 overs)

Somerset won by 4 wickets
Headingley, Leeds
Umpires: John Holder & John Jameson
Player of the match: Viv Richards (Somerset)

- Match was scheduled for one day but extended to two.

=== Quarter-finals ===
7, 8 August 1985
(scorecard)

Kent; 172/9 (60 overs)	v	Essex; 174/4 (56.4 overs)
Neil Taylor 51; John Lever 2/25 (12 overs)		Graham Gooch 43; Richard Ellison 4/22 (12 overs)

Essex won by 6 wickets
County Ground, Chelmsford
Umpires: Ray Julian & Alan Whitehead
Player of the match: Richard Ellison (Kent)

- Match was scheduled for one day but extended to two.

7, 8 August 1985
(scorecard)

Glamorgan; 188 all out (59.5 overs)	v	Worcestershire; 192/6 (54.3 overs)
Rodney Ontong 55; John Inchmore 5/25 (11.5 overs)		David Smith 97; Mark Price 3/22 (7 overs)

Worcestershire won by 4 wickets
St. Helen's, Swansea
Umpires: John Hampshire & Roy Palmer
Player of the match: John Inchmore (Worcestershire)

- Match was scheduled for one day but extended to two.

7, 8, 9 August 1985
(scorecard)

Nottinghamshire; 287/8 (60 overs)	v	Gloucestershire; 277/9 (60 overs)
Tim Robinson 90; Phil Bainbridge 3/54 (12 overs)		Phil Bainbridge 55; Kevin Saxelby 2/34 (12 overs)

Nottinghamshire won by 10 runs
The Royal & Sun Alliance County Ground, Bristol
Umpires: Mervyn Kitchen & Don Oslear
Player of the match: Tim Robinson (Nottinghamshire)

- Match was scheduled for one day but extended to three.

7, 8 August 1985
(scorecard)

Hampshire; 299/5 (60 overs)	v	Somerset; 150 all out (39.2 overs)
Robin Smith 110; Colin Dredge 2/54 (12 overs)		Ian Botham 64; Nigel Cowley 3/41 (6 overs)

Hampshire won by 149 runs
County Ground, Taunton
Umpires: Sam Cook & Barrie Leadbeater
Player of the match: Robin Smith (Hampshire)

- Match was scheduled for one day but extended to two.

=== Semi-finals ===
21, 22 August 1985
(scorecard)

Hampshire; 224/8 (60 overs)	v	Essex; 224/7 (60 overs)
Mark Nicholas 39; Stuart Turner 3/38 (12 overs)		Graham Gooch 93*; Cardigan Connor 3/52 (12 overs)

Essex won by losing fewer wickets
County Ground, Southampton
Umpires: Barrie Meyer & Nigel Plews
Player of the match: Graham Gooch (Essex)

- Match was scheduled for one day but extended to two.

21, 22 August 1985
(scorecard)

Worcestershire; 232/8 (60 overs)	v	Nottinghamshire; 233/6 (59.2 overs)
Tim Curtis 92; Richard Hadlee 2/35 (12 overs)		Tim Robinson 139; Dipak Patel 2/43 (12 overs)

Nottinghamshire won by 4 wickets
New Road, Worcester
Umpires: Jack Birkenshaw & Don Oslear
Player of the match: Tim Robinson (Nottinghamshire)

- Match was scheduled for one day but extended to two.

=== Final ===
7 September 1985
(scorecard)

Essex; 280/2 (60 overs)	v	Nottinghamshire; 279/5 (60 overs)
Brian Hardie 110 (149); Andrew Pick 1/36 (8 overs)		Tim Robinson 80 (142); Stuart Turner 2/43 (12 overs)

Essex won by 1 run
Lord's, London
Umpires: David Constant & Barrie Meyer
Player of the match: Brian Hardie (Essex)
