= Indian cricket team in England in 1982 =

International cricket tour

India in England in 1982
	India	England
- Dates: 5 May – 13 July 1982
Captains	Sunil Gavaskar	Bob Willis

Test series
- Result: England won the 3-match series 1–0
Most runs	Kapil Dev (292)	Ian Botham (403)
Most wickets	Dilip Doshi (13)	Bob Willis (15)
- Player of the series: Kapil Dev (Ind)

One Day International series
- Results: England won the 2-match series 2–0
Most runs	Kapil Dev (107)	Allan Lamb (134)
Most wickets	Madan Lal (3)	Ian Botham (5)
- Player of the series: Allan Lamb (Eng) and Kapil Dev (Ind)

The Indian cricket team toured England from 5 May to 13 July 1982 for two One Day Internationals (ODIs) as part of the Prudential Trophy, and a three-match Test series.

England beat India in both the ODIs. Allan Lamb, who made his ODI debut for England in the series, and scored 134 runs, was named the player of the series along with India's Kapil Dev, who scored 102 runs in the two games. In the Test series that followed, England beat India 1–0. Dev was named the player of the series, having scored 292 runs at an average of 73 and a wicket tally of 10. Also as a part of the tour, India played ten other first-class games, winning one and drawing nine, and three limited overs games, winning and losing one each.

== Tour matches ==
=== Limited overs match: Lavinia, Duchess of Norfolk's XI vs Indians ===
5 May
Scorecard

Indians; 201/5 (45 overs)	v	Lavinia, Duchess of Norfolk's XI; 202/0 (44.5 overs)
Yashpal Sharma 66*; Robin Hobbs 2/47 (6 overs)		Sadiq Mohammad 107*; Sandeep Patil 0/21 (3 overs)

Lavinia, Duchess of Norfolk's XI won by 10 wickets
Arundel Castle Cricket Ground, Arundel
Umpires: Lloyd Budd (Eng) and John Langridge (Eng)

- Toss not known

=== Three-day match: Warwickshire v Indians ===
9–11 May
Scorecard

Indians	v	Warwickshire
243 (74.3 overs); Gundappa Vishwanath 67; Anton Ferreira 3/67 (21 overs)		447/7d (151 overs); Anton Ferreira 112*; Kapil Dev 2/86 (26 overs)
351/5 (74 overs); Sunil Gavaskar 172; Gladstone Small 3/45 (10 overs)

Match drawn
Edgbaston Cricket Ground, Birmingham
Umpires: David Evans (Eng) and Barrie Meyer (Eng)

- Warwickshire won the toss and decided to field.
- Sunil Gavaskar reached 20,000 runs in first-class cricket.

=== Three-day match: Nottinghamshire vs Indians ===
12–14 May
Scorecard

Nottinghamshire	v	Indians
141 (51 overs); Derek Randall 29; Kapil Dev 5/39 (16 overs)		259 (118.2 overs); Pranab Roy 51; Kevin Saxelby 4/47 (22.2 overs)
251/4d (94.4 overs); Tim Robinson 52; Ravi Shastri 2/69 (31 overs)		97/6 (18.3 overs); Kapil Dev 40 (29); Kevin Cooper 3/38 (7 overs)

Match drawn
Trent Bridge, Nottingham
Umpires: Dickie Bird (Eng) and Alan Whitehead (Eng)

- Indians won the toss and decided to field.

=== Three-day match: Yorkshire vs Indians ===
15–18 May
Scorecard

Yorkshire	v	Indians
376/5d (88.4 overs); Ghulam Parkar 146; Nick Taylor 2/76 (14.4 overs)		260/3d (84.1 overs); Kevin Sharp 115; Dilip Doshi 2/85 (26.1 overs)
171/5d (53 overs); Kapil Dev 30; Peter Whiteley 2/59 (13 overs)		35/0 (15 overs); Kevin Sharp 20*; Suru Nayak 0/4 (1 over)

Match drawn
Park Avenue, Bradford
Umpires: David Constant (Eng) and Nigel Plews (Eng)

- Indians won the toss and decided to bat.

=== Three-day match: Marylebone Cricket Club vs Indians ===
19–21 May
Scorecard

MCC	v	Indians
319/4d (81 overs); Derek Randall 130; Madan Lal 3/63 (19 overs)		180 (59.4 overs); Dilip Vengsarkar 96; Graham Dilley 5/69 (19 overs)
126/2d (37 overs); Chris Tavaré 75*; Madan Lal 1/41 (12 overs)		143/4 (55 overs); Ghulam Parkar 92; Derek Pringle 1/5 (5 overs)

Match drawn
Lord's Cricket Ground, St John's Wood
Umpires: Don Oslear (Eng) and Alan Whitehead

- Toss not known.

=== Three-day match: Kent vs Indians ===
22–24 May
Scorecard

Kent	v	Indians
302/7d (86.1 overs); Laurie Potter 96; Suru Nayak 2/40 (13 overs)		282/3d (91 overs); Ashok Malhotra 154*; Eldine Baptiste 3/78 (22 overs)
248/4d (79 overs); Laurie Potter 118; Ravi Shastri 2/64 (26 overs)		68/3 (27 overs); Suru Nayak 37*; Chris Cowdrey 1/20 (9 overs)

Match drawn
St Lawrence Ground, Canterbury
Umpires: Dickie Bird (Eng) and David Evans (Eng)

- Toss not known

=== Limited overs match: Ireland vs Indians ===
26 May
Scorecard

Indians; 179/2 (43.5 overs)	v	Ireland
Pranab Roy 84* (151); Ivan Anderson 1/43 (10 overs)

No result
Ormeau Cricket Ground, Belfast
Umpires: Maurice Moore (Ire) and Joe Vaughan (Ire)

- Ireland won the toss and decided to field.
- It was a 55-over-per-side match.

=== Limited overs match: Ireland vs Indians ===
27 May
Scorecard

Ireland; 134/9 (50 overs)	v	Indians; 137/5 (41.3 overs)
Enda McDermott 50 (96); Dilip Doshi 4/11 (9 overs)		Ravi Shastri 43 (87); Alan Hughes 2/16 (6 overs)

Indians won by 5 wickets
Ormeau Cricket Ground, Belfast
Umpires: George Archer (Ire) and Peter Reith (ire)

- Indians won the toss and decided to field
- It was a 55-over-per-side match, but was reduced to 50 overs per side.

=== Three-day match: Hampshire vs Indians ===
29–31 May
Scorecard

Hampshire	v	Indians
336/6d (98 overs); Trevor Jesty 164*; Dilip Doshi 3/86 (28 overs)		277/6d (86.4 overs); Gundappa Vishwanath 100; John Southern 3/83 (23.4 overs)
236/2d (64 overs); Gordon Greenidge 156; Dilip Doshi 1/39 (14 overs)		298/7 (60.2 overs); Dilip Vengsarkar 86; Tim Tremlett 2/30 (5 overs)

Indians won by three wickets
County Ground, Southampton
Umpires: Barrie Meyer (Eng) and Peter Wight (Eng)

- Hampshire won the toss and decided to bat.

=== Three-day match: Northamptonshire vs Indians ===
5–7 June
Scorecard

Indians	v	Northamptonshire
203/5d (55 overs); Gundappa Vishwanath 106*; Sarfraz Nawaz 2/21 (10 overs)		204 (75.5 overs); Robert Carter 79; Suru Nayak 5/54 (22 overs)
197/4 (59 overs); Suru Nayak 67*; Richard Williams 2/50 (18 overs)

Match drawn
County Cricket Ground, Northampton
Umpires: Ken Palmer (Eng) and Terry Spencer (Eng)

- Toss not known.

=== Two-day match: Oxford and Cambridge Universities vs Indians ===
17–18 June
Scorecard

Oxford and Cambridge Universities	v	Indians
288/7d (83 overs); Richard Ellis 90; Shivlal Yadav 5/107 (28 overs)		354/6d (84.1 overs); Sunil Gavaskar 120; Robin Boyd-Moss 3/58 (11.1 overs)
234/7d (56.4 overs); Kevin Hayes 62; Dilip Doshi 3/43 (13.4 overs)		51/1 (13 overs); Yashpal Sharma 24*; Derek Pringle 1/16 (4 overs)

Match drawn
Fenner's, Cambridge
Umpires: Ray Julian (Eng) and Don Oslear (Eng)

- Indians won the toss and decided to field.

=== Three-day match: Gloucestershire vs Indians ===
19–21 June
Scorecard

Indians	v	Gloucestershire
245/5d (106.1 overs); Madan Lal 51*; David Graveney 1/15 (16 overs)		200/6d (64.3 overs); Chris Broad 73; Ravi Shastri 2/23 (10.3 overs)
200/4d (67 overs); Madan Lal 58*; David Graveney 2/42 (21 overs)		39/4 (14 overs); Sadiq Mohammad 15*; Madan Lal 4/28 (7 overs)

Match drawn
Phoenix County Ground, Bristol
Umpires: Bill Alley (Aus) and Jack Birkenshaw (Eng)

- Gloucestershire won the toss and decided to field.
- Edward Cunningham (Eng) made his debut in first-class matches.

=== Three-day match: Essex vs Indians ===
3–5 July
Scorecard

Essex	v	Indians
336 (112 overs); Brian Hardie 161; Shivlal Yadav 3/77 (24 overs)		258/7d (85 overs); Ashok Malhotra 85; Derek Pringle 5/59 (19 overs)
175/4d (62.2 overs); Keith Pont 58*; Shivlal Yadav 1/19 (11 overs)		171/5 (45 overs); Ravi Shastri 74; Ray East 4/49 (15 overs)

Match drawn
County Cricket Ground, Chelmsford
Umpires: Jack van Geloven (Eng) and Peter Wight (Eng)

- Essex won the toss and decided to bat.

== Prudential Trophy ==
The 1982 edition of the Prudential Trophy was a One Day International (ODI) cricket tournament held in England. In the two ODIs between England and India, the former won both the games.

=== First match ===
2 June
Scorecard

India; 193 (55 overs)	v	England; 194/1 (50.1 overs)
Kapil Dev 60 (37); Ian Botham 4/56 (11 overs)		Barry Wood 78* (137); Madan Lal 1/21 (9 overs)

England won by 9 wickets
Headingley, Leeds
Attendance: 10,000
Umpires: David Constant (Eng) and Don Oslear (Eng)
Player of the match: Barry Wood (Eng)

- England won the toss and decided to field.
- Allan Lamb (Eng) and Ghulam Parkar (Ind) made their ODI debuts.

=== Second match ===
4 June
Scorecard

England; 276/9 (55 overs)	v	India; 162/8 (55 overs)
Allan Lamb 99 (109); Sandeep Patil 2/37 (11 overs)		Kapil Dev 47 (62); Geoff Miller 3/27 (11 overs)

England won by 114 runs
The Oval, London
Attendance: 10,208
Umpires: David Evans (Eng) and Barrie Meyer (Eng)
Player of the match: Allan Lamb

- India won the toss and decided to field.

== Test series summary ==
=== First Test ===
10–15 June
Scorecard

England	v	India
433 (148.1 overs); Derek Randall 126 (290); Kapil Dev 5/125 (43 overs)		128 (50.4 overs); Sunil Gavaskar 48 (133); Ian Botham 5/46 (19.4 overs)
67/3 (19 overs); Allan Lamb 37 (53); Kapil Dev 3/43 (10 overs)		369 (111.5 overs); Dilip Vengsarkar 157 (264); Bob Willis 6/101 (28 overs)

England won by 7 wickets
Lord's Cricket Ground, St John's Wood
Umpires: David Evans (Eng) and Barrie Meyer (Eng)
Player of the match: Kapil Dev (Ind)

- England won the toss and decided to bat
- Allan Lamb and Derek Pringle (both Eng), and Ghulam Parkar (Ind) made their Test debuts.

=== Second Test ===
24–28 June 1982
Scorecard

England	v	India
425 (153.1 overs); Ian Botham 128 (169); Dilip Doshi 6/102 (47.1 overs)		379/8 (104 overs); Sandeep Patil 129* (196); Phil Edmonds 3/94 (37 overs)

Match drawn
Old Trafford, Manchester
Umpires: Dickie Bird (Eng) and Barrie Meyer (Eng)
Player of the match: Sandeep Patil (Ind)

- England won the toss and decided to bat
- Suru Nayak (Ind) made his Test debut.

=== Third Test ===
8–13 July 1982
Scorecard

England	v	India
594 (173.3 overs); Ian Botham 208 (226); Dilip Doshi 4/175 (46 overs)		410 (129.2 overs); Kapil Dev 97 (93); Bob Willis 3/78 (23 overs)
191/3d (70.3 overs); Chris Tavaré 75 (208); Suru Nayak 1/16 (5.3 overs)		111/3 (36 overs); Gundappa Viswanath 75* (116); Derek Pringle 2/32 (11 overs)

Match drawn
Kennington Oval, Kennington
Umpires: Dickie Bird (Eng) and Alan Whitehead (Eng)
Player of the match: Ian Botham (Eng)

- England won the toss and decided to bat.

== External sources ==
CricketArchive – tour itineraries

== Annual reviews ==
- Playfair Cricket Annual 1983
- Wisden Cricketers' Almanack 1983
