= Mark Davies (cricketer, born 1962) =

English cricketer (born 1962)

Personal information
- Full name: Mark Robert Davies
- Born: 24 September 1962 (age 64); Shrewsbury, Shropshire, England
- Batting: Right-handed
- Bowling: Right-arm medium

Domestic team information
- Years: Team
- 1982–2002: Shropshire

Career statistics
Competition	List A
Matches	10
Runs scored	199
Batting average	19.90
100s/50s	–/1
Top score	89
Balls bowled	–
Wickets	–
Bowling average	–
5 wickets in innings	–
10 wickets in match	–
Best bowling	–
Catches/stumpings	1/–
- Source: Cricinfo, 4 July 2011

Mark Robert Davies (born 24 September 1962) is an English former cricketer. Davies was a right-handed batsman who bowled right-arm medium pace. He was born in Shrewsbury, Shropshire and educated at the Priory School, Shrewsbury.

Davies made his debut for Shropshire in the 1982 Minor Counties Championship against Durham. Davies played Minor counties cricket for Shropshire from 1982 to 2002, which included 136 Minor Counties Championship appearances and 41 MCCA Knockout Trophy appearances. He made his List A debut against Northamptonshire in the 1985 NatWest Trophy. He made 9 further List A appearances, the last of which came against the Surrey Cricket Board in the 2000 NatWest Trophy. In his 10 List A matches, he scored 199 runs at an average of 19.90, with a high score of 89. This score, which was his only List A half century, came against Leicestershire in the 1989 NatWest Trophy.

He served as Shropshire County Cricket Club's Captain from 1993 to 1997 and played at club level for Newport and St George's as well as factory based clubs Perkins in Shrewsbury and Audley of Newport. Outside Shropshire, he also played for the Worcestershire Second XI team.

Davies was also a footballer who has played for Worcester City, Dudley Town and Oswestry Town.
