= Keith Hardie =

Keith Hardie may refer to:

- Keith C. Hardie, member of the Wisconsin State Assembly
- Keith Hardie (cricketer), Scottish cricketer
