= Stuart Fletcher =

Stuart Fletcher may refer to:

- Stuart Fletcher (cricketer), English cricketer
- Stuart Fletcher (musician), English bass player
