= Paul Wallace (Irish cricketer) =

Irish cricketer

Personal information
- Full name: Paul Wallace
- Born: 4 May 1962 (age 64); Derry, Northern Ireland
- Batting: Right-handed
- Bowling: Left-arm fast-medium
- Role: Bowler

Domestic team information
- Years: Team
- 1988: Ireland

Career statistics
| Competition | First-class |
|---|---|
| Matches | 1 |
| Runs scored | 0 |
| Batting average | 0.00 |
| 100s/50s | 0/0 |
| Top score | 0 |
| Balls bowled | 150 |
| Wickets | 2 |
| Bowling average | 45.50 |
| 5 wickets in innings | 0 |
| 10 wickets in match | 0 |
| Best bowling | 2/91 |
| Catches/stumpings | 0/– |
- Source: Cricinfo, 26 October 2018

Paul Wallace (born 4 May 1962) is a former Irish first-class cricketer.

Wallace was born at Derry and educated at Templemore Secondary School. Playing club cricket for St Johnston and Brigade Cricket Club, Wallace made a single appearance in first-class cricket for Ireland against Scotland at Dumfries in 1988. Bowling with his left-arm fast-medium, Wallace took the wickets of David Snodgrass and Jack Ker in Scotland's first-innings, ending with figures of 2/91 from 25 overs. With the bat, he was dismissed without scoring in Ireland's first-innings be James Govan, and when asked to follow-on, he was again dismissed by the same bowler without scoring. He did not feature for Ireland again after this match. Outside of cricket, Wallace owns a conservatory installation company.
