= 1980 Benson & Hedges Cup =

- Administrator: Test and County Cricket Board
- Cricket format: Limited overs cricket (55 overs per innings)
- Champions: Northamptonshire (1st title)
- Participants: 20
- Matches: 47
- Most runs: 368 Graham Gooch (Essex)
- Most wickets: 18 Sarfraz Nawaz (Northamptonshire)

The 1980 Benson & Hedges Cup was the ninth edition of cricket's Benson & Hedges Cup. The Minor Counties were restricted to one team and Scotland entered the competition for the first time.

The competition was won by Northamptonshire County Cricket Club.

== Fixtures and results ==
=== Group stage ===
==== Group A ====
Team	Pld	W	L	Pts	BowSR
Lancashire	4	4	0	8	34.083
Nottinghamshire	4	3	1	6	38.606
Leicestershire	4	2	2	4	39.939
Derbyshire	4	1	3	2	53.833
Scotland	4	0	4	0	104.889

==== Group B ====
Team	Pld	W	L	Pts	BowSR
Northamptonshire	4	4	0	8	36.528
Worcestershire	4	3	1	6	42.581
Warwickshire	4	2	2	4	67.684
Yorkshire	4	1	3	2	42.355
Oxford and Cambridge Universities	4	0	4	0	75.4

==== Group C ====
Team	Pld	W	L	Pts	BowSR
Essex	4	3	1	6	41.548
Sussex	4	3	1	6	45.207
Glamorgan	4	2	2	4	48.917
Gloucestershire	4	1	3	2	42.387
Minor Counties	4	1	3	2	53.05

==== Group D ====
Team	Pld	W	L	Pts	BowSR
Middlesex	4	4	0	8	35.306
Surrey	4	3	1	6	43.172
Somerset	4	2	2	4	44.207
Kent	4	1	3	2	51.708
Hampshire	4	0	4	0	42.367

=== Quarter-finals ===
11 June 1980
(scorecard)

Essex; 270/5 (55 overs)	v	Surrey; 184 all out (48 overs)
Ken McEwan 95; Roger Knight 2/40 (11 overs)		Geoff Howarth 42; Keith Pont 3/26 (9.2 overs)

Essex won by 86 runs
County Ground, Chelmsford
Umpires: Ray Julian & John Langridge
Player of the match: Ken McEwan (Essex)

11, 12 June 1980
(scorecard)

Worcestershire; 314/5 (55 overs)	v	Lancashire; 269 all out (54.2 overs)
Phil Neale 128; Bernard Reidy 2/70 (11 overs)		Ian Cockbain 53; Hartley Alleyne 3/39 (10.2 overs)

Worcestershire won by 45 runs
Old Trafford, Manchester
Umpires: Sam Cook & Arthur Jepson
Player of the match: Glenn Turner (Worcestershire)

- Reserve day used. No play first day

11 June 1980
(scorecard)

Middlesex; 195 all out (54.5 overs)	v	Sussex; 166 all out (53.3 overs)
John Emburey 34*; Colin Wells 4/21 (11 overs)		Paul Parker 59; Wayne Daniel 3/21 (11 overs)

Middlesex won by 29 runs
Lord's, London
Umpires: Jack van Geloven & Peter Wight
Player of the match: John Emburey (Middlesex)

11 June 1980
(scorecard)

Nottinghamshire; 143 all out (51.1 overs)	v	Northamptonshire; 145/3 (47.1 overs)
Derek Randall 48; Tim Lamb 4/11 (11 overs)		Geoff Cook 66; Richard Hadlee 2/24 (11 overs)

Northamptonshire won by 7 wickets
County Ground, Northampton
Umpires: Bill Alley & Tom Spencer
Player of the match: Tim Lamb (Northamptonshire)

=== Semi-finals ===
25, 26 June 1980
(scorecard)

Northamptonshire; 206/8 (55 overs)	v	Middlesex; 195 all out (53.4 overs)
Richard Williams 73*; Mike Gatting 3/68 (11 overs)		Mike Gatting 91; Sarfraz Nawaz 5/21 (11 overs)

Northamptonshire won by 11 runs
Lord's, London
Umpires: Lloyd Budd & Alan Whitehead
Player of the match: Richard Williams (Northamptonshire)

- Reserve day used. Middlesex were 128/5 (41 overs) at the close of the scheduled day's play

25, 26, 27 June 1980
(scorecard)

Worcestershire; 236/9 (55 overs)	v	Essex; 240/2 (51 overs)
Alan Ormrod 70; John Lever 2/46 (9 overs)		Graham Gooch 81; Hartley Alleyne 1/48 (11 overs)

Essex won by 8 wickets
New Road, Worcester
Umpires: David Evans & Ken Palmer
Player of the match: Mike Denness (Essex)

- Two reserve days used. Worcestershire were 42/1 (11 overs) at the close of the scheduled day's play, and 55/1 (15 overs) at the close of the second day's play

=== Final ===
19, 21 July 1980
(scorecard)

Northamptonshire; 209 all out (54.5 overs)	v	Essex; 203/8 (55 overs)
Allan Lamb 72; Keith Pont 4/60 (11 overs)		Graham Gooch 60; Sarfraz Nawaz 3/23 (11 overs)

Northamptonshire won by 6 runs
Lord's, London
Umpires: David Constant & Barrie Meyer
Player of the match: Allan Lamb (Northamptonshire)

- Reserve day used. No play first day

== See also ==
Benson & Hedges Cup
