= Hedley Wright =

English cricketer

Personal information
- Full name: Hedley James Wootton Wright
- Born: 20 June 1953 (age 73); Spilsby, Lincolnshire, England
- Batting: Left-handed
- Bowling: Right-arm medium-fast

Domestic team information
- Years: Team
- 1984–1990: Suffolk
- 1975–1978: Buckinghamshire

Career statistics
Competition	List A
Matches	4
Runs scored	38
Batting average	12.66
100s/50s	–/–
Top score	16
Balls bowled	180
Wickets	4
Bowling average	31.75
5 wickets in innings	–
10 wickets in match	–
Best bowling	3/29
Catches/stumpings	3/–
- Source: Cricinfo, 12 May 2011

Hedley James Wootton Wright (born 20 June 1953) is a former English cricketer. Wright was a left-handed batsman who bowled right-arm medium-fast. He was born in Spilsby, Lincolnshire.

Wright made his debut for Buckinghamshire in the 1975 Minor Counties Championship against Bedfordshire. He played Minor counties cricket for Buckinghamshire from 1975 to 1978, making 13 appearances.

He later joined Suffolk, making his debut for the county in the 1984 Minor Counties Championship. He played Minor counties cricket for Suffolk from 1984 to 1990, which included 33 Minor Counties Championship matches and 6 MCCA Knockout Trophy matches. It was for Suffolk that he made his debut in List A cricket against Lancashire in the 1985 NatWest Trophy. He played 3 further List A matches for Suffolk, the last coming against Northamptonshire in the 1989 NatWest Trophy. In his 4 List A matches, he scored 38 runs at a batting average of 12.66, with a high score of 16. With the ball he took 4 wickets at a bowling average of 31.75, with best figures of 3/29.
