= Paul Wallace =

Paul Wallace may refer to:

- Paul Wallace (rugby union) (born 1971), Irish former international rugby union player
- Paul A. W. Wallace (1891–1967), Canadian historian and anthropologist
- Paul Wallace (racing driver) (born 1958), British former racing driver
- Paul Wallace (basketball) (1925–1998), American basketball player
- Paul Wallace (Irish cricketer) (born 1962), Irish cricketer
- Paul Wallace (South African cricketer) (born 1957), South African cricketer
- Paul Wallace (swimmer), American swimmer
