= Paul Burn =

English cricketer (born 1963)

Personal information
- Full name: Paul Burn
- Born: 31 October 1963 (age 63); Sacriston, County Durham, England
- Batting: Right-handed
- Bowling: Right-arm medium

Domestic team information
- Years: Team
- 1999: Durham Cricket Board
- 1992: Northumberland
- 1990: Minor Counties
- 1985–1991: Durham

Career statistics
| Competition | FC | LA |
|---|---|---|
| Matches | 1 | 9 |
| Runs scored | 47 | 117 |
| Batting average | 47.00 | 14.62 |
| 100s/50s | –/– | –/– |
| Top score | 47 | 43 |
| Balls bowled | – | 18 |
| Wickets | – | – |
| Bowling average | – | – |
| 5 wickets in innings | – | – |
| 10 wickets in match | – | – |
| Best bowling | – | – |
| Catches/stumpings | –/– | 1/– |
- Source: Cricinfo, 7 November 2010

Paul Burn (born 31 October 1963) is a former English cricketer. Burn was a right-handed batsman who bowled right-arm medium pace. He was born at Sacriston, County Durham.

Burn made his debut in County Cricket for Durham in the 1985 Minor Counties Championship against Cumberland. From 1985 to 1991, he represented the county in 40 Championship matches, the last of which came against Cambridgeshire. Burn also represented Durham in the MCCA Knockout Trophy, making his debut in that competition against Hertfordshire in 1986. From 1986 to 1991, he played 6 Trophy matches for the county, the last of which came against Cumberland. It was for Durham that Burn made his debut in List A cricket against Derbyshire in the 1985 NatWest Trophy. From 1985 to 1991, he represented the county in 6 List A matches, the last of which came against Glamorgan in the 1991 NatWest Trophy. Following Durham's elevation to first-class status at the end of the 1991 season, Burn played no further matches for the county.

While playing Minor counties cricket for Durham, he made his one and only appearance in first-class cricket for the combined Minor Counties cricket team against the touring Indians. In this match he scored 47 runs at a batting average of 17, with a high score of 47*. In his other innings in the match, he was dismissed for a duck.

In 1992, he joined Northumberland where he played 3 Minor Counties Championship matches for the county in that season against Lincolnshire, Bedfordshire and Buckinghamshire. As well as those matches, he played 3 MCCA Knockout Trophy matches during the 1992 season against Cheshire, Lincolnshire and Staffordshire. Burn also played a single final List A match for Northumberland, which came against Yorkshire in 1992 NatWest Trophy.

Burn later represented the Durham Cricket Board in 2 List A matches which came against Oxfordshire and Staffordshire, both in the 1999 NatWest Trophy. In his combined total of 9 List A matches, he scored 117 runs at an average of 14.62, with a high score of 43. In the field he took a single catches.
