= Edward Cunningham =

Edward or Ed Cunningham may refer to:

- Edward Francis Cunningham (c. 1742–1795), Scottish painter
- Edward S. Cunningham (1859–1957), Australian newspaper editor
- Edward Cunningham (cricketer) (born 1962), English cricketer
- Eddie Cunningham, rugby player
- Ed Cunningham (born 1969), American sports announcer and former American football player
- Ed Cunningham (executive), American lawyer and CEO
- Ed Cunningham, character in the 7 Faces of Dr. Lao
- Ted Cunningham (born 1937), Australian politician
