= 1987 Benson & Hedges Cup =

- Administrator: Test and County Cricket Board
- Cricket format: Limited overs cricket (55 overs per innings)
- Champions: Yorkshire (1st title)
- Participants: 20
- Matches: 47
- Most runs: 445 Ashley Metcalfe (Yorkshire)
- Most wickets: 15 Stuart Fletcher (Yorkshire)

The 1987 Benson & Hedges Cup was the sixteenth edition of cricket's Benson & Hedges Cup.

The competition was won by Yorkshire County Cricket Club.

== Fixtures and results ==
=== Group stage ===
==== Group A ====
Team	Pld	W	L	NR	Pts	BpR
Gloucestershire	4	3	1	0	6	1.407
Northamptonshire	4	2	2	0	4	1.260
Derbyshire	4	2	2	0	4	1.443
Nottinghamshire	4	2	2	0	4	1.721
Leicestershire	4	1	3	0	2	1.705

==== Group B ====
Team	Pld	W	L	NR	Pts	BpR
Yorkshire	4	4	0	0	8	1.508
Worcestershire	4	3	1	0	6	1.533
Lancashire	4	1	2	1	3	1.649
Warwickshire	4	1	2	1	3	1.675
Scotland	4	0	4	0	0	2.164

==== Group C ====
Team	Pld	W	L	NR	Pts	BpR
Somerset	4	3	1	0	6	1.255
Hampshire	4	3	1	0	6	1.401
Essex	4	2	2	0	4	1.911
Middlesex	4	1	2	1	3	1.644
Combined Universities	4	0	3	1	1	1.667

==== Group D ====
Team	Pld	W	L	NR	Pts	BpR
Surrey	4	4	0	0	8	1.276
Kent	4	3	1	0	6	1.282
Glamorgan	4	1	3	0	2	1.450
Sussex	4	1	3	0	2	1.455
Minor Counties	4	1	3	0	2	1.682

=== Quarter-finals ===
27 May 1987
(scorecard)

Gloucestershire; 250/7 (55 overs)	v	Kent; 251/9 (55 overs)
Bill Athey 61; Chris Penn 2/52 (11 overs)		Derek Aslett 56; Phil Bainbridge 2/44 (11 overs)

Kent won by 1 wicket
County Ground, Bristol
Umpires: Mervyn Kitchen & Alan Whitehead
Player of the match: Chris Cowdrey (Kent)

27 May 1987
(scorecard)

Northamptonshire; 212 all out (54.2 overs)	v	Somerset; 183 all out (50.5 overs)
Richard Williams 72; Adrian Jones 3/33 (10.2 overs)		Neil Burns 43*; David Capel 4/38 (11 overs)

Northamptonshire won by 29 runs
County Ground, Taunton
Umpires: David Constant & Nigel Plews
Player of the match: Richard Williams (Northamptonshire)

27 May 1987
(scorecard)

Worcestershire; 233/8 (55 overs)	v	Surrey; 234/3 (53.4 overs)
Tim Curtis 78; Sylvester Clarke 4/47 (11 overs)		David Smith 110*; Phil Newport 2/34 (8 overs)

Surrey won by 7 wickets
The Oval, London
Umpires: David Evans & Barrie Leadbeater
Player of the match: David Smith (Surrey)

27 May 1987
(scorecard)

Hampshire; 174/8 (55 overs)	v	Yorkshire; 178/1 (45.5 overs)
David Turner 38; Stuart Fletcher 3/41 (11 overs)		Ashley Metcalfe 93*; Malcolm Marshall 1/18 (9 overs)

Yorkshire won by 9 wickets
Headingley Cricket Ground, Leeds
Umpires: Barrie Meyer & Don Oslear
Player of the match: Ashley Metcalfe (Yorkshire)

=== Semi-finals ===
10 June 1987
(scorecard)

Kent; 275/7 (55 overs)	v	Northamptonshire; 279/5 (54.4 overs)
Chris Cowdrey 87; Winston Davis 3/37 (11 overs)		Allan Lamb 126*; Derek Underwood 2/64 (11 overs)

Northamptonshire won by 5 wickets
St Lawrence Ground, Canterbury
Umpires: John Hampshire & Nigel Plews
Player of the match: Allan Lamb (Northamptonshire)

10, 11, 12 June 1987
(scorecard)

Yorkshire; 238/7 (55 overs)	v	Surrey; 162 all out (48.2 overs)
Martyn Moxon 97; Martin Bicknell 3/29 (11 overs)		Grahame Clinton 69; Arnie Sidebottom 3/29 (8.2 overs)

Yorkshire won by 76 runs
Headingley Cricket Ground, Leeds
Umpires: Jack Birkenshaw & David Constant
Player of the match: Martyn Moxon (Yorkshire)

- Two reserve days used. Surrey were 41/3 at the close of the first day's play. No play on the first reserve day.

=== Final ===
11 July 1987
(scorecard)

Northamptonshire; 244/7 (55 overs)	v	Yorkshire; 244/6 (55 overs)
David Capel 97; Paul Jarvis 4/43 (11 overs)		Jim Love 75*; Richard Williams 3/32 (11 overs)

Yorkshire won by losing fewer wickets
Lord's, London
Umpires: Dickie Bird & Ken Palmer
Player of the match: Jim Love (Yorkshire)

== See also ==
Benson & Hedges Cup
