= Barry Jackson =

Barry Jackson may refer to:

== Sports ==
- Barry Jackson (athlete) (born 1941), track and field athlete
- Barry Jackson (cricketer) (born 1966), English cricketer
- Barry Jackson (footballer) (1938–2021), English footballer
- Barry Jackson (rugby union) (1937–2019), England international rugby union player

== Other ==
- Barry Jackson (actor) (1938–2013), English actor
- Barry Jackson (director) (1879–1961), English theatre director
- Barry E. Jackson (born 1954), production designer and writer
- Barry Steven Jackson (born 1960), Congressional staffer
- Barry Jackson (surgeon) (born 1936), British surgeon
