= Ian Lawrence =

Ian Lawrence may refer to:

- Ian Lawrence (mayor) (1937–2019), Wellington lawyer and mayor of Wellington, 1983–1986
- Ian Lawrence (cricketer) (born 1963), former English cricketer
- Ian Lawrence (footballer) (born 2002), Costa Rican footballer
