= Prudential Trophy =

The Prudential Trophy was the name used for One Day International cricket tournaments held in England from 1972 until 1982. During this time, Prudential also sponsored the World Cup tournaments in 1975, 1979 and 1983.

Depending on the number of teams touring England in a given season, there would typically be either one or two series each year, involving the home side and each visiting side.

== Series by year ==
Year	Teams	Matches	Result	Notes
1972	England vs Australia	3	2–1	
1973	England vs New Zealand	2	1–0	
1973	England vs West Indies	2	1–1	West Indies awarded series on scoring rate
1974	England vs India	2	2–0	
1974	England vs Pakistan	2	0–2	
1976	England vs West Indies	3	0–3	
1977	England vs Australia	3	2–1	
1978	England vs Pakistan	2	2–0	
1978	England vs New Zealand	2	2–0	
1980	England vs West Indies	2	1–1	West Indies awarded series on scoring rate
1980	England vs Australia	2	2–0	
1981	England vs Australia	3	1–2	
1982	England vs India	2	2–0	
1982	England vs Pakistan	2	2–0	

== Successor series ==
- Texaco Trophy
- Emirates Triangular (1998)
- NatWest Series (2000–present)
