= Michael Milton (cricketer) =

English cricketer (born 1943)

Personal information
- Full name: Michael Edward Milton
- Born: 28 November 1943 (age 82); St Pancras, London, England
- Batting: Right-handed
- Bowling: Slow left-arm orthodox

Domestic team information
- Years: Team
- 1979–1989: Buckinghamshire

Career statistics
Competition	List A
Matches	2
Runs scored	75
Batting average	37.50
100s/50s	–/–
Top score	42
Balls bowled	108
Wickets	2
Bowling average	29.00
5 wickets in innings	–
10 wickets in match	–
Best bowling	1/13
Catches/stumpings	–/–
- Source: Cricinfo, 5 May 2011

Michael Edward Milton (born 28 November 1943) is a former English cricketer. Milton was a right-handed batsman who bowled slow left-arm orthodox. He was born in St Pancras, London.

Milton made his debut for Buckinghamshire in the 1979 Minor Counties Championship against Hertfordshire. Milton played Minor counties cricket for Buckinghamshire from 1979 to 1989, which included 46 Minor Counties Championship matches and 7 MCCA Knockout Trophy matches. In 1984, he made his List A debut against Lancashire in the NatWest Trophy. He played a further List A match for Buckinghamshire against Somerset in the 1985 NatWest Trophy. In his two List A matches, he scored 75 runs at a batting average of 37.50, with a high score of 42. With the ball he took two wickets at a bowling average of 29.00, with best figures of 1/13.

He also played for Finchley Cricket Club and Second XI cricket for the Middlesex Second XI.
