= John Foster (cricketer) =

English former cricketer

Personal information
- Full name: John Foster
- Born: 2 November 1955 (age 71); Oldham, Lancashire, England
- Batting: Right-handed
- Relatives: Edward Foster (son)

Domestic team information
- Years: Team
- 1980–1994: Shropshire

Career statistics
Competition	List A
Matches	8
Runs scored	181
Batting average	22.62
100s/50s	–/2
Top score	63
Balls bowled	–
Wickets	–
Bowling average	–
5 wickets in innings	–
10 wickets in match	–
Best bowling	–
Catches/stumpings	5/–
- Source: Cricinfo, 4 July 2011

John Foster (born 2 November 1955) is a former English cricketer. Foster was a right-handed batsman. He was born in Oldham, Lancashire and educated at Hulme Grammar School and the University of Bradford.

Foster made his debut for Shropshire in the 1980 Minor Counties Championship against Durham. Foster played Minor counties cricket for Shropshire from 1980 to 1994, which included 105 Minor Counties Championship appearances and 17 MCCA Knockout Trophy appearances. He served as Shropshire's club captain in 1987–1992. He made his List A debut against Somerset in the 1983 NatWest Trophy. He made 7 further List A appearances, the last of which came against Leicestershire in the 1991 NatWest Trophy. In his 8 List A matches, he scored 181 runs at an average of 22.62, with a high score of 63. This score, which was one of 2 List A half centuries, came against Northamptonshire in the 1985 NatWest Trophy.

His son, Edward, has played first-class cricket for Loughborough UCCE and Minor counties cricket for Shropshire.
