= Ed Foster (cricketer) =

English cricketer

Personal information
- Full name: Edward John Foster
- Born: 21 January 1985 (age 41); Shrewsbury, Shropshire, England
- Batting: Left-handed
- Role: Wicket-keeper
- Relatives: John Foster (father)

Domestic team information
- Years: Team
- 2005–2007: Loughborough UCCE
- 2004–present: Shropshire

Career statistics
Competition	First-class
Matches	6
Runs scored	291
Batting average	32.33
100s/50s	1/1
Top score	105
Balls bowled	–
Wickets	–
Bowling average	–
5 wickets in innings	–
10 wickets in match	–
Best bowling	–
Catches/stumpings	5/1
- Source: Cricinfo, 4 July 2011

Edward John Foster (born 21 January 1985 in Banbury, Oxfordshire) is an English cricketer. Foster is a dashing left-handed opening batsman and wicket-keeper. Appearing for Shropshire in Minor counties cricket, Foster has also played first-class for Loughborough UCCE team which recorded a shock eight-wicket victory over Worcestershire. He had a fine match, scoring 83 in the first innings, as he put on 197 for the first wicket with Richard Clinton, then following up with 22 not out in the second.

His father, John, played List A and Minor counties cricket for Shropshire.
