= Stephen Wall (cricketer) =

English cricketer (born 1959)

Personal information
- Full name: Stephen Wall
- Born: 10 December 1959 (age 66); Ulverston, Lancashire, England
- Batting: Right-handed
- Bowling: Right-arm medium-fast

Domestic team information
- Years: Team
- 1987–1993: Cumberland
- 1984–1985: Warwickshire
- 1983: Cumberland

Career statistics
Competition	First-class	List A
Matches	19	13
Runs scored	175	26
Batting average	10.93	6.50
100s/50s	–/–	–/–
Top score	28	11
Balls bowled	2,651	638
Wickets	37	10
Bowling average	41.02	47.60
5 wickets in innings	–	–
10 wickets in match	–	–
Best bowling	4/59	3/24
Catches/stumpings	6/–	3/–
- Source: Cricinfo, 23 September 2011

Stephen Wall (born 10 December 1959) is a former English cricketer. Wall was a right-handed batsman who bowled right-arm medium-fast. He was born in Ulverston, Lancashire.

Wall made his debut in county cricket for Cumberland in the 1983 Minor Counties Championship against Staffordshire, making five further appearances in that season's competition, before joining Warwickshire for the 1984 season. He made his debut for Warwickshire in that season's County Championship against Leicestershire. He made eighteen further first-class appearances for the county, the last of which came against Middlesex in the 1985 County Championship. In his nineteen first-class matches, he took a total of 37 wickets at an average of 41.02, with best figures of 4/59. With the bat he scored 175, which came at a batting average of 10.93, with a high score of 28. He made his List A debut in the 1984 John Player Special League against Sussex. He nine further List A appearances for Warwickshire, the last of which came against Worcestershire in the 1985 John Player Special League. In his nine appearances, he took 7 wickets at an average of 48.00, with best figures of 2/31. He left Warwickshire at the end of the 1985 season.

He rejoined Cumberland in 1987, between then and 1993 he made 30 Minor Counties Championship appearances and eleven MCCA Knockout Trophy appearances. He also made three List A appearances for Cumberland, against Sussex in the 1987 NatWest Trophy, Worcestershire in the 1988 NatWest Trophy and Lancashire in the 1989 NatWest Trophy. In his three List A appearances for the county, he took 3 wickets at an average of 46.66, with best figures of 3/24.
