= Keith Teasdale =

English cricketer

Personal information
- Full name: Keith Teasdale
- Born: 29 March 1954 (age 72); Castle Eden, County Durham, England
- Batting: Left-handed
- Bowling: Right-arm medium

Domestic team information
- Years: Team
- 1984–1990: Cheshire

Career statistics
Competition	List A
Matches	3
Runs scored	72
Batting average	24.00
100s/50s	0/0
Top score	46
Catches/stumpings	0/–
- Source: Cricinfo, 7 April 2011

Keith Teasdale (born 26 March 1954) is a former English cricketer. Teasdale was a left-handed batsman who bowled right-arm medium.

== Early life ==
He was born in Castle Eden, County Durham.

== Professional career ==
Teasdale made his debut for Cheshire in the 1984 MCCA Knockout Trophy against Cumberland. Teasdale played Minor counties cricket for Cheshire from 1984 to 1990, including 33 Minor Counties Championship matches and 7 MCCA Knockout Trophy matches. In 1985, he made his List A debut against Yorkshire in the NatWest Trophy.

He played two further List A matches for Cheshire, against Surrey in 1986 and Glamorgan in 1987. In his three List A matches, he scored 72 runs at a batting average of 24.00, with a high score of 46. His highest List A score of 46 came against Yorkshire on debut, with his innings being ended by Arnie Sidebottom.
