= John Tierney (cricketer) =

English cricketer (born 1964)

Personal information
- Full name: John Kevin Tierney
- Born: 17 June 1964 (age 62); Ashford, Kent, England
- Batting: Right-handed
- Bowling: Right-arm fast-medium

Domestic team information
- Years: Team
- 1985–1997: Devon

Career statistics
Competition	List A
Matches	5
Runs scored	43
Batting average	8.60
100s/50s	0/0
Top score	26
Balls bowled	318
Wickets	5
Bowling average	50.40
5 wickets in innings	0
10 wickets in match	0
Best bowling	3/47
Catches/stumpings	0/–
- Source: Cricinfo, 10 February 2011

John Kevin Tierney (born 17 June 1964) was an English cricketer. Tierney was a right-handed batsman who bowled right-arm fast-medium. He was born in Ashford, Kent.

Tierney made his debut for Devon in the 1985 Minor Counties Championship against Cornwall. From 1985 to 1997, he represented the county in 35 Championship matches, the last of which came against Cheshire. He made his MCCA Knockout Trophy debut for the county in 1985 against Wiltshire. From 1985 to 1997, he represented the county in 22 Trophy matches, the last of which came against Shropshire. During his playing career with Devon, he won two MCCA Knockout Trophy's. He played List A cricket for Devon at a time when they were permitted to take part in the domestic one-day competition, making his debut in that format in the 1985 NatWest Trophy against Warwickshire. From 1985 to 1991, he represented Devon in 5 List A matches, the last of which came in the 1991 NatWest Trophy against Essex. In his 5 List A matches, he scored 43 runs at a batting average of 8.60, with a high score of 26. With the ball he took 5 wickets at a bowling average of 50.40, with best figures of 3/47 against Warwickshire in 1985.
