= Peter Neal =

Scottish cricketer

Personal information
- Full name: Edward Peter Neal
- Born: 2 June 1961 (age 65); Edinburgh, Midlothian, Scotland
- Batting: Right-handed
- Bowling: Right-arm medium-fast

Domestic team information
- Years: Team
- 1980–1996: Hertfordshire

Career statistics
Competition	List A
Matches	5
Runs scored	70
Batting average	14.00
100s/50s	0/1
Top score	52
Balls bowled	138
Wickets	0
Bowling average	–
5 wickets in innings	–
10 wickets in match	–
Best bowling	–
Catches/stumpings	3/–
- Source: Cricinfo, 6 June 2011

Edward Peter Neal (born 2 June 1961) is a former Scottish cricketer. Neal was a right-handed batsman who bowled right-arm medium-fast. He was born in Edinburgh, Midlothian. He was known by his middle name Peter.

Neal made his debut for Hertfordshire in the 1980 Minor Counties Championship against Suffolk. Neal played Minor counties cricket for Hertfordshire from 1980 to 1996, which included 53 Minor Counties Championship matches and 13 MCCA Knockout Trophy matches. He made his List A debut against Essex in the 1981 NatWest Trophy. He made 4 further List A appearances for the county, the last coming against Middlesex in the 1988 NatWest Trophy. In his 5 List A matches, he scored 70 runs at an average of 14.00. He made a single half century, scoring 52 against Worcestershire in the 1985 NatWest Trophy. He bowled 23 overs with the ball, without taking a wicket.

He played Second XI cricket for the Northamptonshire Second XI in 1980 and 1981.
