= Ricardo Ellcock =

English cricketer

Personal information
- Full name: Ricardo McDonald Ellcock
- Born: 17 June 1965 (age 61); Redmans Village, St Thomas, Barbados
- Nickname: Ricky
- Batting: Right-handed
- Bowling: Right arm fast

Domestic team information
- Years: Team
- 1982–1988: Worcestershire
- 1983/84–1984/85: Barbados
- 1989–1991: Middlesex

Career statistics
Competition	FC	LA
Matches	46	30
Runs scored	424	57
Batting average	12.47	6.33
100s/50s	0/0	0/0
Top score	45*	13
Balls bowled	5,652	1,377
Wickets	117	38
Bowling average	29.01	25.65
5 wickets in innings	1	0
10 wickets in match	0	N/A
Best bowling	5/35	4/43
Catches/stumpings	9/0	7/0
- Source: CricketArchive, 1 December 2008

Ricardo ("Ricky") McDonald Ellcock (born 17 June 1965) is a Barbados-born former English cricketer who played first-class and List A cricket between the early 1980s and the early 1990s. His career was seriously hampered by injury, and despite being picked to tour with England in 1989–90 he was forced into retirement shortly afterward.

After his cricket career finished, Ellcock became a commercial pilot, and was the first black captain with Virgin Atlantic.

== Early career ==
Ellcock was educated at Combermere School in Barbados, Malvern College in England, British Aerospace Flying College Scotland and the University of Westminster in London (MSc Air Transport Planning and Management). After a couple of seasons of Second XI cricket, and immediately after taking 11 wickets in one such game against Warwickshire II, Ellcock made his full Worcestershire debut in a County Championship match against future employers Middlesex at Worcester at the end of 1982, still only 17 years old. He took three lower-order wickets and scored 0 in his only innings. His next match was against Scotland in the Benson & Hedges Cup at Mannofield Park, the first List A game to be played at the Aberdeen venue. Ellcock took one wicket and did not bat.

He played quite often in 1983, and ended the season with 25 first-class wickets at 37.24 and nine List A wickets at 17.88; the latter figure included 4/43 in a John Player Special League fixture against Kent, a career best that he equalled six years later for Middlesex. In the English winter of 1983–84 he played for his native Barbados, as he did again (albeit very briefly) in 1984–85.

In 1984, Ellcock picked up 29 first-class wickets, his highest in any one season, but his struggles with fitness meant that he never again approached that figure for Worcestershire. Worcestershire won the County Championship in 1988, but Ellcock only played four County Championship matches (one of which Worcestershire won) that year. After several such seasons of struggle Ellcock moved to Middlesex for the 1989 season. Although he did not play until June, he managed his most productive summer: 32 first-class wickets at under 20 runs apiece, and 16 wickets at 23 in the one-day game. He matched his List A best with 4/43 versus Nottinghamshire in July in the NatWest Trophy, and a week later recorded his only five-wicket haul when he claimed 5/35 against Yorkshire in the Championship.

== Later cricket career ==
The England selectors were sufficiently impressed by Ellcock's form to call him up for the winter tour against West Indies. However, his tour had barely begun before it was over: he pulled up after just a few balls in the nets, and when he was diagnosed with a stress fracture of his back he was forced to go home without having played a single match on tour.

Ellcock missed the entire 1990 season, but returned to play a few matches for Middlesex in 1991. Despite evidence of a possibility of improving, such as match figures of 6–110 against Somerset, he was unable to make a success of his comeback and retired in mid-season.

== Personal life ==
Ellcock became a pilot and was the first black pilot and first black captain with Virgin Atlantic.

Ricky Ellcock wrote and published his autobiography “Balls to Fly” in November 2023

His brother Dale Ellcock had a short career with Barbados.
