= Jonathan Hartley =

English cricketer (born 1960)

Personal information
- Full name: Jonathan Samuel Hartley
- Born: 8 January 1960 (age 66); Burnley, Lancashire, England
- Batting: Left-handed
- Bowling: Right-arm medium

Domestic team information
- Years: Team
- 1989–1994: Oxfordshire

Career statistics
Competition	List A
Matches	6
Runs scored	99
Batting average	19.80
100s/50s	–/–
Top score	46
Balls bowled	264
Wickets	6
Bowling average	33.66
5 wickets in innings	–
10 wickets in match	–
Best bowling	2/48
Catches/stumpings	1/–
- Source: Cricinfo, 20 May 2011

Jonathan Samuel Hartley (born 8 January 1960) is a former English cricketer. Hartley was a left-handed batsman who bowled right-arm medium pace. He was born in Burnley, Lancashire.

Hartley made his debut for Oxfordshire in the 1989 Minor Counties Championship against Buckinghamshire. Hartley played Minor counties cricket for Oxfordshire from 1989 to 1994, which included 43 Minor Counties Championship matches and 11 MCCA Knockout Trophy matches. He made his List A debut against Gloucestershire in the 1989 NatWest Trophy. He played 5 further List A matches, the last coming against Glamorgan in the 1993 NatWest Trophy. In his 6 List A matches, he scored 99 runs at a batting average of 19.80, with a high score of 46. With the ball he took 6 wickets at a bowling average of 33.66, with best figures of 2/48.

He had previously played Second XI and Minor counties cricket for the Lancashire Second XI from 1979 to 1982, later playing for the Warwickshire Second XI in 1986.
