= Ian Pont =

English cricketer (born 1961)

Personal information
- Full name: Ian Leslie Pont
- Born: 28 August 1961 (age 65); Brentwood, Essex, England
- Nickname: Ponty
- Height: 6 ft 2.5 in (1.89 m)
- Batting: Right-handed
- Bowling: Right-arm fast
- Role: Pace Bowler
- Relatives: Keith Pont (brother); Kelvin Pont (brother)

Domestic team information
- Years: Team
- 1982: Nottinghamshire
- 1983: Minor Counties
- 1985–1988: Essex
- 1985/86: Natal
- 1989: Northumberland
- 1990: Lincolnshire
- FC debut: 17 July 1982 Nots v Middlesex
- Last FC: 30 August 1988 Essex v Surrey
- LA debut: 6 September 1981 Notts v Gloucestershire
- Last LA: 27 June 1990 Lincs v Gloucestershire

Career statistics
Competition	First-class	List A
Matches	28	26
Runs scored	404	137
Batting average	16.16	19.57
100s/50s	0/1	0/0
Top score	68	36
Balls bowled	3,978	1,123
Wickets	70	20
Bowling average	35.78	40.45
5 wickets in innings	3	0
10 wickets in match	0	0
Best bowling	5/73	2/16
Catches/stumpings	5/–	3/–
- Source: CricketArchive, 28 May 2010

Ian Leslie Pont (born 28 August 1961) is an English former cricketer and current coach, specialising in coaching Twenty20 cricket. Known for a powerful throw and a brief foray into the world of baseball, Pont mainly played for Essex during his career, as did his brother Keith Pont. Ian Pont won the Nat West (1985), Sunday/Pro 40 League (1985) and County Championship (1986) titles with Essex.

== Biography ==
=== Overview ===
Ian Pont is a well known bowling coach. With his joint baseball and javelin backgrounds, Pont brought ballistic biomechanics to fast bowling. He has simplified the technical aspects of pace bowling coaching by creating the 4 Tent Pegs Drill and ABSAT coaching now accepted by many respected coaches, as a blueprint for engineering a safe, robust bowling action whilst increasing speed and accuracy. He is an author of three books.

His first book The Fast bowler's Bible, is used by coaches and players at all levels all over the world. His second book Coaching Youth Cricket is recommended reading by the ECB. His third publication Ultimate Pace Secrets, reveals how pace in the bowling action is generated.

Whilst some feel Pont is far ahead of his time he has also been an inspiration to others who have developed based on his pioneering work. Creating the phrase "Pre-Turn" for cricket, he has enabled players to focus on hip/shoulder separation, which is key to generating speed.

=== Additional ===
Pont's cricket ball throw of 126.18m set in Bellville, Cape Town in 1981, is the second longest verified throw of all time.

He had tryouts as a pitcher with six Major League Baseball teams including New York Yankees and Philadelphia Phillies in 1986 and 1987.

Aside from cricket and baseball, Pont briefly joined Thurrock Athletics Club where he took up the javelin and had basic lessons in technique. It became apparent he had an aptitude and within just six weeks he had thrown the then Olympic qualifying standard of 72m. British Olympic Javelin Coach, Margaret Whitbread, mother of Olympic Gold medallist Fatima Whitbread, saw Pont throw and commented, "he has the most natural throwing arm this side of the Iron Curtain". Due to Pont's contract with cricket he never pursued the javelin when many felt he was destined to become a rival to Great Britain star, Steve Backley.

He was one of the instigators of coloured clothing in English domestic cricket in 1993 after his company Hogger Sports made the replica clothing for the ICC 1992 World Cup.

He presented BBC Essex radio programme "Ian Pont's Sporting Sunday" during 1990s.

=== Coaching career ===
Pont, former ECB National Skill Sets Coach, worked with Kent, Warwickshire and Worcestershire during the 2000s. Here he spent time working with Shoaib Akhtar who credited him in his book "Controversially Yours" – before being appointed Bowling Coach of his native Essex (2006-2008) where he worked and helped develop a young Dale Steyn. Pont then assisted Northants (2008-2010) with their bowlers' development.

In 2006/7, he was made Assistant Head Coach/National Bowling Coach of the Netherlands National team and a selector at the 2007 World Cup.

He was appointed Bangladesh National Bowling Coach from 2010 to 2011, when the team won 11 of its 14 ODIs up to the end of the 2011 World Cup.

In 2011 and 2012, he coached Ranji Team, Haryana in India, helping to develop both Harshal Patel and Mohit Sharma.

2012 saw Pont appointed Head Coach of the Dhaka Gladiators, for the inaugural Bangladesh Premier League (BPL) and he led the team to tournament victory at the first attempt. He remained the Head Coach of Dhaka Gladiators in the 2nd edition of BPL held in 2013, which the team went on to win again, giving the franchise back-to-back titles.

He is a three time ICC World Cup coach having been at the 2003 South Africa WC (with England), 2007 West Indies WC (with Netherlands) and 2011 India, Sri Lanka and Bangladesh WC (with hosts Bangladesh).

In 2016, he was appointed Assistant Coach/Bowling Coach of the Quetta Gladiators in the inaugural edition of the Pakistan Super League (PSL). The side finished runners up.

In October 2016, he was asked by Rajasthan Cricket Association to design and implement coaching camps in Jaipur where he oversaw the training and development of their fast bowlers.

In July 2019, Pont was appointed as the head coach of the Belfast Titans for the inaugural edition of the Euro T20 Slam cricket tournament.
