= Kevin Rice =

English cricketer (born 1965)

Personal information
- Full name: Kevin Geoffrey Rice
- Born: 13 January 1965 (age 61); Morchard Bishop, Devon, England
- Batting: Right-handed
- Bowling: Right-arm off break

Domestic team information
- Years: Team
- 1984–1998: Devon

Career statistics
Competition	List A
Matches	6
Runs scored	167
Batting average	27.83
100s/50s	1/–
Top score	107
Balls bowled	36
Wickets	–
Bowling average	–
5 wickets in innings	–
10 wickets in match	–
Best bowling	–
Catches/stumpings	–/–
- Source: Cricinfo, 12 February 2011

Kevin Geoffrey Rice (born 13 January 1965) is a former English cricketer. Rice was a right-handed batsman who bowled right-arm off break. He was born in Morchard Bishop, Devon.

Rice made his debut for Devon in the 1984 Minor Counties Championship against Cornwall. From 1984 to 1998, he represented the county in 47 Championship matches, the last of which came against Cheshire. He made his MCCA Knockout Trophy debut for the county in 1985 against Wiltshire. From 1985 to 1991, he represented the county in 13 Trophy matches, the last of which came against Dorset. Ward also played List A cricket for Devon at a time when they were permitted to take part in the domestic one-day competition, making his debut in that format against Warwickshire in the 1985 NatWest Trophy. He played 5 further List A matches between 1985 and 1991, the last of which came against Essex in the 1991 NatWest Trophy. In his 6 List A matches, he scored 167 runs at a batting average of 27.83, with a single century high score of 107 which came on his List A debut.

He also played Second XI cricket for the Gloucestershire Second XI (1981–1983) and the Somerset Second XI (1984).
