= West Indian cricket team in England in 1980 =

International cricket tour

	West Indies	England
- Dates: 8 May – 14 August 1980
Captains	Clive Lloyd	Ian Botham

Test series
- Result: West Indies won the 5-match series 1–0
Most runs	Viv Richards (379); Desmond Haynes (308)	Graham Gooch (394); Geoffrey Boycott (368)
Most wickets	Joel Garner (26); Michael Holding (20)	Bob Willis (15); Ian Botham (14)
- Player of the series: Joel Garner (WI)

One Day International series
- Results: 2-match series drawn 1–1
Most runs	Gordon Greenidge (117)	Geoffrey Boycott (75)
Most wickets	Michael Holding (5)	Chris Old (3); Ian Botham (3)

The West Indian cricket team toured England in 1980, spending virtually the whole of the 1980 English cricket season in England. West Indies also played two matches in Ireland and two in Scotland.

The highlights of the tour were a two-match One Day International series for the 1980 Prudential Trophy and a five-Test series for the Wisden Trophy, both against the English cricket team. West Indies were captained by Clive Lloyd, and England by Ian Botham. The ODI series was tied 1–1, and the Test series was ruined by rain. West Indies won the First Test, but the following four were all drawn due to weather interruptions, so West Indies won the series 1–0.

During the second test at Lords, Viv Richards completed his 3,000 test runs in 54 innings at the time third fastest after Don Bradman and Everton Weekes.

West Indies also played numerous matches against the first-class counties and other minor teams, winning many of them. West Indies were only beaten twice on the tour, by Essex in a 50-over warm-up match, and by England in the Second ODI, both at the end of May. Thereafter, they were unbeaten until the tour ended in August

== Squads ==
Gordon Greenidge, Desmond Haynes, Faoud Bacchus, Viv Richards (vice captain), Clive Lloyd (captain), Derick Parry, Alvin Kallicharan, Lawrence Rowe, Collis King, Deryck Murray, David Murray, Andy Roberts, Michael Holding, Joel Garner, Malcolm Marshall, Colin Croft.

When Lawrence Rowe dropped out of the tour through injury, Larry Gomes was invited to replace him but declined as he had not played for two months. Timur Mohamed, who was at the time playing for Suffolk, joined the touring party instead.

== Warm-up matches ==
The tour began with the traditional fixture against Lavinia, Duchess of Norfolk's XI at Arundel Castle on 8 May 1980. West Indies won the 45-over match by 121 runs.

West Indies spent most of the rest of May warming up for the matches against England. West Indies played 3-day matches against Worcestershire, Leicestershire and Northamptonshire, then two 50-over matches against Middlesex and two 50-over matches against Essex, and finally a 3-day match against Derbyshire. Except for the first one-day match against Middlesex on 20 May (which was rained off) and the first one-day match against Essex (won by Essex, the first loss by West Indies on the tour), all of these matches were won by West Indies.

== One-day Internationals ==
The West Indies won the Prudential Trophy on scoring rate.

=== 1st ODI ===
28, 29 May 1980
Scorecard

West Indies; 198 (55 overs)	v	England; 174 (51.2 overs)
CG Greenidge 78 (147); CM Old 2/12 (11 overs)		CJ Tavaré 82* (129); MD Marshall 3/28 (11 overs)

West Indies won by 24 runs
Headingley, Leeds
Umpires: BJ Meyer and KE Palmer
Player of the match: CJ Tavaré (ENG)

- England won the toss and elected to field.
- Reserve day used. England were 35/3 (23 overs) at the close of the first day.
- CJ Tavaré (ENG) and MD Marshall (WIN) made their ODI debuts.

The First ODI was held at Headingley on 28 May. England won the toss and put West Indies in to bat first. They reached 198 all out, with 78 from Gordon Greenidge. Joel Garner was run out off the last ball having scored 14. Play was interrupted by the weather, with England on 35/3 overnight, and resumed the next day, 29 May. Despite England's number 3, Chris Tavaré, reaching 82 not out, West Indies bowled England out for 174 off 51.2 overs to win by 24 runs.

=== 2nd ODI ===
30 May 1980
Scorecard

West Indies; 235/9 (55 overs)	v	England; 236/7 (54.3 overs)
DL Haynes 50 (86); RGD Willis 2/25 (10 overs)		G Boycott 70 (115); MA Holding 3/28 (11 overs)

England won by 3 wickets
Lord's, London
Umpires: DJ Constant and DGL Evans
Player of the match: G Boycott (ENG)

- England won the toss and elected to field.
- VJ Marks (ENG) made his ODI debut.

The Second ODI was played the following day, 30 May, at Lord's, with Viv Richards standing in as captain for Clive Lloyd. Again, England won the toss and put West Indies in to bat. They reached 235 for 9 off their 55 overs, led by a 50 from Desmond Haynes. Thanks to a century opening stand by Peter Willey (56) and Geoffrey Boycott (70), and 42 not out from Ian Botham, England reached their target off the third ball of the final over to win by 3 wickets.

West Indies then played and won a 3-day match against Kent.

== Test matches ==
=== First Test ===
5 – 10 June 1980
(5–day match)
Scorecard

England	v	West Indies
263 (91.5 overs); IT Botham 57 (83); AME Roberts 5/72 (25 overs)		308 (91.1 overs); IVA Richards 64 (110); DL Murray 64 (121); RGD Willis 4/82 (20.1 overs)
252 (111.1 overs); G Boycott 75 (263); J Garner 4/30 (34.1 overs)		209/8 (68.4 overs); DL Haynes 62 (184); RGD Willis 5/65 (26 overs)

West Indies won by 2 wickets
Trent Bridge, Nottingham
Umpires: DJ Constant and DO Oslear
Player of the match: AME Roberts (WIN)

- England won the toss and elected to bat.
- 8 June was taken as a rest day.
- CJ Tavaré (ENG) made his Test debut.

The First Test was played at Trent Bridge from 5 June. England won the toss and batted. Honours were fairly even between the West Indies pace bowling attack (Andy Roberts, Joel Garner, Michael Holding and Malcolm Marshall) and England's pace attack (Bob Willis, who took 9 wickets, supported by John Lever and Ian Botham) and the batsmen. West Indies were well placed at 109/2 at the end of the fourth day, chasing a target of 208 to win, and won by 2 wickets on the final day.

The tour continued with 3-day matches against a combined Oxford University and Cambridge University team, won by West Indies, and a draw against Sussex.

=== Second Test ===
19 – 24 June 1980
(5–day match)
Scorecard

England	v	West Indies
269 (95.3 overs); GA Gooch 123 (162); MA Holding 6/67 (28 overs)		518 (147.2 overs); DL Haynes 184 (395); RGD Willis 3/103 (31 overs)
133/2 (52 overs); G Boycott 49* (161); J Garner 2/21 (15 overs)

Match drawn
Lord's, London
Umpires: WE Alley and BJ Meyer
Player of the match: IVA Richards (WIN)

- England won the toss and elected to bat.
- 22 June was taken as a rest day.
- There was only half an hour's play on the fourth day."Second Cornhill Test". Wisden.
- Viv Richards passed 3,000 test runs

The Second Test was played at Lord's from 19 June. England again won the toss and batted. Graham Gooch reached 123, but had little support, with Holding and Garner in the wickets. West Indies replied with a mammoth 518, including a stand of 223 for the second wicket between Haynes (184) and Viv Richards (145). Weather interruptions left West Indies with insufficient time to bowl England out a second time, and the match ended in a draw with England on 133–2 in their second innings.

West Indies then played two matches against Ireland at Clontarf in Dublin on 25 June and 26 June, both affected by the weather. The first was drawn, and West Indies won the second on a faster run rate, with Faoud Bacchus reaching 163. West Indies then played a drawn 3-day match and won a 40-over match against Glamorgan, and won and drew 3-day matches against Gloucestershire and Somerset, respectively.

=== Third Test ===
10 – 15 July 1980
(5–day match)
Scorecard

England	v	West Indies
150 (48.2 overs); BC Rose 70 (106); AME Roberts 3/23 (11.2 overs)		260 (72.3 overs); CH Lloyd 101 (159); JE Emburey 3/20 (10.3 overs)
391/7 (143 overs); G Boycott 86 (273); MA Holding 3/100 (34 overs)

Match drawn
Old Trafford, Manchester
Umpires: HD Bird and KE Palmer
Player of the match: CH Lloyd (WIN)

- West Indies won the toss and elected to field.
- 13 July was taken as a rest day.
- There was no play on the third day.

The Third Test began on 10 July at Old Trafford. West Indies won the toss and put England in to bat, a good decision, as it turned out: England were bowled out for 150 on the first day. West Indies batted through the second day, and the third day was rained off, but they eventually were all out for 260 in reply, with a century by captain Clive Lloyd. England batted through most of the last two days, reaching 391–7 to draw the match.

Little play was possible on the first day of a 2-day match against Scotland at Forthill in Dundee on 17 July; the match was abandoned on the second day, and West Indies won the replacement 50-over match. West Indies then beat Yorkshire over 3 days.

=== Fourth Test ===
24 – 29 July 1980
(5–day match)
Scorecard

England	v	West Indies
370 (128.3 overs); GA Gooch 83 (128); CEH Croft 3/97 (35 overs)		265 (95.2 overs); SFAF Bacchus 61 (159); GR Dilley 4/57 (23 overs)
209/9d (94 overs); P Willey 100* (203); MA Holding 4/79 (29 overs)

Match drawn
The Oval, London
Umpires: BJ Meyer and DO Oslear
Player of the match: P Willey (ENG)

- England won the toss and elected to bat.
- 27 July was taken as a rest day.
- There was no play on the third day.

The Fourth Test was played at The Oval from 24 July 1980. England won the toss and batted, reaching 370, with contributions through the batting order. Gooch top-scored on 83; Boycott (53) and Brian Rose (50) also reached half-centuries, and Mike Gatting just missed out on 48. Extras was second-highest scorer, on 57 – this was the second time that West Indies conceded over 50 extras in the Test series, having given 52 away in England's second innings in the First Test. No play was possible on the third day, and West Indies eventually conceded their first first-innings deficit of the Test series, all out for 265 (with captain Clive Lloyd absent hurt), and England were in trouble, at 18–4 just before the close on the fourth day, but batted through the final day to reach 209–9 declared, with England number 8 Peter Willey reaching 100 not out in an unbroken stand of 117 for the final wicket with Bob Willis (24*), and the match was drawn.

West Indies then drew a 2-day match against Minor Counties and a 3-day match against Warwickshire.

=== Fifth Test ===
7 – 12 August 1980
(5–day match)
Scorecard

England	v	West Indies
143 (47 overs); DL Bairstow 40 (73); CEH Croft 3/35 (12 overs)		245 (84.5 overs); DL Haynes 42 (108); GR Dilley 4/79 (23 overs)
227/6d (75 overs); GA Gooch 55 (88); MD Marshall 3/42 (19 overs)

Match drawn
Headingley, Leeds
Umpires: WE Alley and KE Palmer
Player of the match: DL Haynes (WIN)

- West Indies won the toss and elected to field.
- 10 August was taken as a rest day.
- There was no play on the first and fourth days.

The Fifth and final Test was played at Headingley from 7 August. West Indies won the toss and decided to field. Again, the weather intervened. No play was possible on the first day. England were bowled out for 143 on the second day, with only two batsmen scoring more than 14 runs – captain Ian Botham (37) and wicketkeeper David Bairstow (40), who had replaced the regular keeper in the first four Tests, Alan Knott. West Indies reached 245 in reply, but the fourth day was also lost, and England reached 227–6 declared on the final day, with the series petering out with a fourth consecutive draw.

The West Indian team finished its tour with a floodlit limited-overs match against Essex, at Stamford Bridge on 14 August.

== Annual reviews ==
- Playfair Cricket Annual 1981
- Wisden Cricketers' Almanack 1981
