= 1992 Sunday League =

- Administrator(s): Test and County Cricket Board
- Cricket format: Limited overs cricket (40 overs per innings)
- Tournament format(s): League
- Champions: Middlesex (1st title)
- Participants: 18
- Matches: 153
- Most runs: 839 Desmond Haynes (Middlesex)
- Most wickets: 31 Shaun Udal (Hampshire)

The 1992 Sunday League was the twenty-fourth edition of English cricket's Sunday League. There was no sponsor for this season. The competition was won for the first time by Middlesex County Cricket Club.

== The season ==
Durham was accorded first-class status at the start of the 1992 season, and joined the competition for the first time. They also won their first match on 19 April versus Lancashire. Australian overseas player Dean Jones scored 114, the Durham's first century in county cricket.

Middlesex equalled Sussex's 1982 record of 14 wins in a season. Their opening batsman Desmond Haynes was the competition's leading run scorer. Hampshire's off-spinner Shaun Udal was the leading wicket taker.

This season was to the final one with teams wearing traditional white clothing. The following season had new sponsors and each team would wear its own coloured uniform.

== Standings ==
Team	Pld	W	T	L	N/R	A	Pts	Rp100
Middlesex (C)	17	14	0	2	1	0	58	93.917
Essex	17	11	0	5	1	0	46	83.338
Hampshire	17	10	0	6	0	1	42	76.717
Surrey	17	10	0	7	0	0	40	90.463
Kent	17	8	0	5	2	2	40	89.843
Somerset	17	9	0	6	1	1	40	81.232
Worcestershire	17	7	1	6	1	2	36	74.489
Durham	17	7	0	7	2	1	34	89.112
Gloucestershire	17	8	0	8	1	0	34	76.040
Warwickshire	17	7	1	7	2	0	34	82.557
Lancashire	17	6	0	7	2	2	32	84.078
Sussex	17	7	0	8	1	1	32	82.547
Derbyshire	17	7	0	9	1	0	30	81.066
Northamptonshire	17	7	0	9	1	0	30	83.214
Yorkshire	17	6	0	9	0	2	28	79.532
Glamorgan	17	4	0	10	2	1	22	86.212
Nottinghamshire	17	3	0	11	1	2	18	81.176
Leicestershire	17	3	0	12	1	1	16	81.085
Team marked (C) finished as champions. Source: CricketArchive

== See also ==
Sunday League
