= David Mercer (cricketer) =

English cricketer (born 1962)

Personal information
- Full name: David Jeremy Matthew Mercer
- Born: 7 May 1962 (age 64); Warrington, Lancashire
- Batting: Right-handed
- Bowling: Right-arm off break
- Role: Occasional wicketkeeper

Domestic team information
- Years: Team
- 1981–1988: Wiltshire
- 1989–1994: Berkshire
- 1995–1996: Wiltshire
- 1997–2005: Bedfordshire

Career statistics
Competition	LA
Matches	17
Runs scored	184
Batting average	12.26
100s/50s	0/0
Top score	45
Catches/stumpings	10/–
- Source: Cricinfo, 26 September 2010

David Jeremy Matthew Mercer (born 7 May 1962) is a former English cricketer. Mercer was a right-handed batsman who bowled right-arm off break. He was born at Warrington, Lancashire.

Mercer made his Minor Counties Championship debut for Wiltshire in 1981 against Oxfordshire. From 1981 to 1988, he represented the county in 52 Championship matches. He also made his debut in the MCCA Knockout Trophy for Wiltshire against Norfolk in 1983. From 1983 to 1988, he represented Wiltshire in 8 Trophy matches. His debut in List-A cricket also came for the county against Northamptonshire in the 1983 NatWest Trophy. During his first stint with the county, he played 2 further List-A matches against Yorkshire in the 1987 NatWest Trophy and Essex in the 1988 NatWest Trophy.

In 1989, Mercer joined Berkshire, making his debut for the county in the Minor Counties Championship against Wiltshire. From 1989 to 1994, he represented the county in 51 Championship matches, the last of which came against Cheshire in the 1994 Championship. Mercer also played MCCA Knockout Trophy matches for Berkshire, playing 8 Trophy matches for the county with his final match coming against Buckinghamshire. His List-A debut for Berkshire came in the 1989 NatWest Trophy against Sussex. From 1989 to 1994, he represented the county in 4 List-A matches, the last of which came against Kent in the 1994 NatWest Trophy.

In 1995, Mercer rejoined Wiltshire. In his second spell with the county he played 18 Minor Counties Championship matches, the last of which came against Dorset in 1996; and 4 Knockout Trophy matches, the last of which came against Hertfordshire in 1996.

In 1997 he joined Bedfordshire. His Minor Counties Championship debut for the county came against Cambridgeshire. From 1997 to 2005, he represented Bedfordshire in 47 Championship matches, the last of which came against Cambridgeshire. Mercer also represented Bedfordshire in the MCCA Knockout Trophy, making his debut in that competition for the county in 1998 against the Surrey Cricket Board. From 1998 to 2003, he represented the county in 18 Trophy matches, the last of which came against Suffolk. His List-A debut for the county came against Glamorgan in the 1998 NatWest Trophy. From 1998 to 2001 he represented the county in 10 List-A matches, the last of which came against Devon in the 2nd round of the 2002 Cheltenham & Gloucester Trophy which was played in 2001.

In his combined 17 List-A matches, he scored 184 runs at a batting average of 12.26, with a high score of 45. In the field he took 10 catches.
