= David Halliwell (cricketer) =

English cricketer (born 1948)

Personal information
- Full name: David Halliwell
- Born: 11 December 1948 (age 77); Leyland, Lancashire, England
- Batting: Left-handed
- Bowling: Right-arm fast-medium

Domestic team information
- Years: Team
- 1981–1990: Cumberland
- 1978–1979: Cheshire

Career statistics
Competition	List A
Matches	6
Runs scored	28
Batting average	14.00
100s/50s	–/–
Top score	25*
Balls bowled	387
Wickets	9
Bowling average	25.44
5 wickets in innings	–
10 wickets in match	–
Best bowling	4/57
Catches/stumpings	–/–
- Source: Cricinfo, 30 March 2011

David Halliwell (born 11 December 1948) is a former English cricketer. Halliwell was a left-handed batsman who bowled right-arm fast-medium. He was born in Leyland, Lancashire.

Halliwell initially played Minor Counties Championship cricket for Cheshire from 1978 to 1979. He later joined Cumberland, making his debut for the county in the 1981 Minor Counties Championship against the Lancashire Second XI. Halliwell played Minor counties cricket for Cumberland from 1981 to 1990, including 59 Minor Counties Championship matches and 7 MCCA Knockout Trophy matches. In 1984, he made his List A debut against Derbyshire in the NatWest Trophy. He played five further List A matches for Cumberland, the last of which came against Lancashire in the 1989 NatWest Trophy. In his five List A matches, he scored 28 runs at a batting average of 14.00, with a high score of 25*. With the ball he took 9 wickets at a bowling average of 25.44, with best figures of 4/57. His best figures came against Middlesex in the 1985 NatWest Trophy.

He also played Second XI cricket for the Northamptonshire Second XI.
