= Dean Hoffman =

English cricketer (born 1966)

Personal information
- Full name: Dean Stuart Hoffman
- Born: 13 January 1966 (age 60); Erdington, Warwickshire, England
- Batting: Right-handed
- Bowling: Right-arm medium-fast

Domestic team information
- Years: Team
- 1989: Cambridgeshire
- 1988: Northamptonshire
- 1985: Warwickshire

Career statistics
Competition	FC	LA
Matches	18	12
Runs scored	59	23
Batting average	5.36	11.50
100s/50s	–/–	–/–
Top score	20*	17*
Balls bowled	2,152	540
Wickets	31	7
Bowling average	40.54	59.00
5 wickets in innings	–	–
10 wickets in match	–	–
Best bowling	4/100	2/18
Catches/stumpings	4/–	2/–
- Source: Cricinfo, 28 November 2010

Dean Stuart Hoffman (born 13 January 1966) is a former English cricketer. Hoffman was a right-handed batsman who bowled right-arm medium-fast. He was born in Erdington, Warwickshire.

Hoffman made his first-class debut for Warwickshire against Surrey in 1985. During the 1985 season he represented the county in 17 first-class matches, the last of which came against Essex in the County Championship. In his 17 first-class matches for Warwickshire, he scored 39 runs at a poor batting average of 3.54, with a high score of 13*. With the ball he took 29 wickets at a bowling average of 40.00, with best figures of 4/100.

It was for Warwickshire that Hoffman made his debut in List A cricket against Somerset. During the 1985 season he played 11 List A matches, the last of which came against Worcestershire. With the ball he took 7 wickets at a bowling average of 50.28, with best figures of 2/18.

In 1988, he played a single first-class match for Northamptonshire against the touring West Indians.

The following season he made his Minor Counties Championship debut for Cambridgeshire against Suffolk. He represented the county in 5 Minor Counties Championship matches during the 1989 season, playing his final Championship match for the county against Hertfordshire. He played 2 MCCA Knockout Trophy matches in 1989 against Suffolk and Bedfordshire. In 1989 he represented the county in a single List A match against Worcestershire in the 1989 NatWest Trophy. The 1989 season was his last in county cricket.
