= Alan Hansford =

English cricketer (born 1968)

Personal information
- Full name: Alan Roderick Hansford
- Born: 1 October 1968 (age 58); Cuckfield, Sussex, England
- Batting: Right-handed
- Bowling: Right-arm medium

Domestic team information
- Years: Team
- 1989–1992: Sussex

Career statistics
Competition	First-class	First-class
Matches	10	32
Runs scored	109	49
Batting average	13.62	9.80
100s/50s	–/–	–/–
Top score	29	13*
Balls bowled	1,921	1,649
Wickets	30	30
Bowling average	33.03	43.76
5 wickets in innings	1	1
10 wickets in match	–	–
Best bowling	5/79	5/32
Catches/stumpings	3/–	3/–
- Source: Cricinfo, 14 March 2012

Alan Roderick Hansford (born 1 October 1968) is a former English first-class cricketer. A right-handed batsman who bowled right-arm medium pace, he was born at Cuckfield, Sussex.

Hansford made his debut in List A cricket for the Combined Universities against Surrey in the 1989 Benson & Hedges Cup. He played five matches for the Combined Universities side in that competition, which captained by Michael Atherton, famously reached the quarter-final of the competition by defeating professional first-class opposition along the way. Having played for the Sussex Second XI since 1987, it was in the 1989 season that he made his first-class debut for Sussex against Cambridge University at Hove, taking figures of 4/46 and 4/29 during the match. During his time at Sussex, he featured infrequently in first-class cricket, making just nine further appearances, the last of which came against Hampshire in the 1992 County Championship. Primarily a bowler, Hansford took 30 wickets in his ten first-class appearances, which came at an average of 33.03, with best figures of 5/79. These figures were his only first-class five wicket haul, and came against Hampshire in 1989.

He first featured in List A cricket for Sussex in his debut season, making his debut in that format for the county in the Refuge Assurance League against Hampshire. He featured in a total of seventeen List A matches for the county in 1989 and 1990, including taking what would be his only five wicket haul in one-day cricket, against Gloucestershire in 1989. In 1991, he once again featured for the Combined Universities in the Benson & Hedges Cup, making four appearances. Further appearances in that format for Sussex followed, with Hansford making five further appearances for the county, the last of which came against Northamptonshire in the Sunday League. In total, Hansford made 23 List A appearances for Sussex, taking 24 wickets at an average of 42.54.

Michael Atherton later wrote that Hansford was the only gay cricketer he had come across, in response to a letter from Hansford in which he wrote "there can't be too many gay accountants who dismissed you twice in a first-class match" (in reference to Hansford's first-class debut against Cambridge University, in which he dismissed Atherton twice).
