= Suru Nayak =

Indian cricketer (born 1954)

Personal information
- Full name: Surendra Vithal Nayak
- Born: 20 October 1954 (age 72); Bombay, Maharashtra, India
- Batting: Left-handed
- Bowling: Right-arm medium

International information
- National side: India
- Test debut (cap 158): 24 June 1982 v England
- Last Test: 8 July 1982 v England
- ODI debut (cap 38): 20 December 1981 v England
- Last ODI: 4 June 1982 v England

Career statistics
Competition	Test	ODI
Matches	2	4
Runs scored	19	3
Batting average	9.50	3.00
100s/50s	0/0	0/0
Top score	11	3
Balls bowled	231	222
Wickets	1	1
Bowling average	132.00	161.00
5 wickets in innings	0	0
10 wickets in match	0	0
Best bowling	1/16	1/51
Catches/stumpings	1/–	1/–
- Source: CricInfo, 4 February 2006

Surendra Vithal Nayak (born 20 October 1954) is a former Indian cricketer who played in two Test matches and four One Day Internationals in 1981 and 1982.
