= Jeremy Thompson (cricketer) =

English cricketer (born 1963)

Jeremy Thompson (born 23 September 1963) was an English cricketer. He was a right-handed batsman and right-arm medium-fast bowler who played for Wiltshire. He was born in Bath, Somerset.

Having made his cricketing debut for Somerset Under-25s and later Somerset Second XI in 1982 and 1983 respectively, Thompson made two List A appearances for the team, the first during the 1989 season and the second a season later.

Thompson scored 34 runs on his debut, and 7 runs in his second, and final, List A match.
