= Brian Marvin =

English cricketer

Brian Marvin (born 21 January 1958) was an English cricketer. He was a right-handed batsman and right-arm medium-pace bowler who played for Bedfordshire. He was born in Stamford, Lincolnshire.

Marvin started his career at the age of 18 with Buckinghamshire, for whom he played until 1978. He took five and a half years out of the game, joining Bedfordshire for the start of the 1984 season.

Having represented Bedfordshire on a consistent basis in 1984 and 1985, he made his only List A appearance during the 1985 NatWest Trophy, against Gloucestershire. He scored a duck in the match and took figures of 2/56 from 11 overs. Marvin continued to represent Bedfordshire until 1986, when he took another break of six years before rejoining the club in 1992.

Marvin played with the team until 1994. He remained a lower order batsman throughout his Minor Counties career.
