= Stuart Waterton =

English cricketer

Personal information
- Full name: Stuart Nicholas Varney Waterton
- Born: 6 December 1960 (age 65); Dartford, Kent
- Batting: Right-handed
- Role: Wicket-keeper

Domestic team information
- Years: Team
- 1980–1985: Kent
- 1986–1987: Northamptonshire
- 1989–1997: Oxfordshire
- 1990: Lancashire
- 1990–1992: Minor Counties

Career statistics
Competition	First-class	List A
Matches	41	27
Runs scored	757	294
Batting average	19.92	22.61
100s/50s	0/3	0/1
Top score	58*	92
Catches/stumpings	79/15	17/7
- Source: Cricinfo, 9 August 2011

Stuart Nicholas Varney Waterton (born 6 December 1960) is an English former professional cricketer. Waterton was a right-handed batsman who fielded as a wicket-keeper. He was born at Dartford in Kent in 1960.

== Cricket career ==
Waterton made his first-class cricket debut for Kent County Cricket Club against Yorkshire in the 1980 County Championship. He made a total of 25 first-class and six List A appearances for Kent between 1980 and 1985, the last of which came against Somerset in the 1985 County Championship. Waterton found his opportunities limited at Kent where he was competing against England wicket-keeper Alan Knott nd future Kent captain Steve Marsh. He left the county at the end of the 1985 season, joining Northamptonshire for the 1986 season.

He made 15 first-class and 12 List A appearances for Northants, plying for the county for two seasons before joining Oxfordshire in 1989, making his debut for the county against Berkshire in the MCCA Knockout Trophy and winning the Minor Counties Championship in his first season at the county. The following season he played a single first-class match for Lancashire in the 1990 County Championship against Nottinghamshire, his only match for the county, and continued to play Minor counties cricket for Oxfordshire until 1997, making a total of 60 Minor Counties Championship appearances and playing for an England Amateur XI against the touring New Zealanders in 1994.

Waterton went on to work as a brand manager for cricket equipment manufacturer Kookaburra Sport.
