= Adrian Dalby =

English cricketer

Adrian Dalby (born 16 September 1957) was an English cricketer. He was a right-handed batsman and a right-arm medium-pace bowler who played for Northumberland. He was born in Malton.

Having appeared both for and against Northamptonshire's Second XI in the Second XI Championship between 1981 and 1982, Dalby reappeared for Northumberland in 1988.

Dalby made a single List A appearance for the team, in the 1989 NatWest Trophy, against Surrey. He took three wickets in the match, including that of future England Test stalwart Alec Stewart. Dalby continued to represent Northumberland until the end of 1989.

He played his club cricket through the 1970s and 1980s, for Scarborough Cricket Club. During this period of his career, the club won both the ECB National Club Cricket Championship and the Yorkshire League (now the Yorkshire ECB County Premier League) on numerous occasions.
