= Lloyd Sluman =

English cricketer

Lloyd Sluman (born 13 February 1952) was an English cricketer. He was a right-handed batsman and right-arm medium-fast bowler who played for Cornwall County Cricket and Berkshire. He was born in Helston, Cornwall.

Sluman, who represented Berkshire in the Minor Counties Championship between 1984 and 1986, made a single List A appearance for the team, in the 1985 NatWest Trophy, against Hampshire. From the tailend, Sluman scored 12 not out, and took the wicket of South African-born England Test cricketer Robin Smith.

Since 2007, Sluman has played for Cornwall in the Over-50s County Championship.
