= John Inchmore =

Personal information
- Full name: John Darling Inchmore
- Born: 22 February 1949 (age 77); Ashington, Northumberland
- Batting: Right-handed
- Bowling: Right-arm fast-medium

Domestic team information
- Years: Team
- 1973–1986: Worcestershire
- 1976/77: Northern Transvaal
- 1987: Wiltshire

Career statistics
Competition	First-class	List A
Matches	218	227
Runs scored	3,137	1,465
Batting average	16.25	13.82
100s/50s	1/7	0/0
Top score	113	49*
Balls bowled	30,198	10,647
Wickets	510	279
Bowling average	28.97	24.92
5 wickets in innings	18	2
10 wickets in match	1	0
Best bowling	8/58	6/29
Catches/stumpings	72/–	48/–
- Source: CricketArchive, 26 November 2008

John Darling Inchmore (born 22 February 1949) is a former English cricketer who played first-class and List A cricket for Worcestershire during the 1970s and 1980s. He also played briefly for Northern Transvaal, and later for Wiltshire.

Born in Northumberland, Inchmore played for the minor county briefly in 1970, then became a teacher in the Saltley area of Birmingham, appearing in club cricket for Stourbridge. He played a few Second XI games for Worcestershire in 1972, but his first-class debut came against the touring New Zealanders at Worcester in late April 1973. In a match badly affected by the weather, he took only one wicket, but it was not a bad one to start with: his county team-mate Glenn Turner, whom Inchmore bowled for 143. His next game, in early May, was his List A debut: a John Player League match against Northamptonshire, in which Inchmore took the single wicket of Geoff Cook.

By the end of 1973, Inchmore was a regular in the Worcestershire first team, and he also played a good number of matches in Worcestershire's County Championship-winning season of 1974. He ended with 39 first-class wickets at 22, including his first five-wicket bag, 5/50 against Middlesex in July. The year also saw him hit his only first-class century. Having never before made more than 30, he came in as night-watchman with John Parker after Glenn Turner had retired hurt. Inchmore took his score to 113 before being run out, while Parker was eventually dismissed for 140.

Inchmore played a significant part in each Worcestershire season from then on, taking between 30 and 63 first-class wickets every summer from 1975 to 1985. His highest aggregate of 63 came in 1975, although he fell only one short of that mark in 1979. In one-day cricket, his most successful season was 1981, when he had 33 victims. He was capped by his county in 1976, and in 1976–77 he played twice for Northern Transvaal in South Africa's Castle Currie Cup. Back in England, in 1977 he produced a career-best innings return of 8/58 against Yorkshire, two wickets in the second innings bringing him his only ten-wicket match haul. However, he was also affected by injury during 1977, and so did not play as much as he had in the previous season.

Although he never managed another hundred, Inchmore did continue to put in the occasional decisive innings with the bat. In 1980 he smashed 64 against Yorkshire at Bradford, an innings taking just 35 minutes and including seven sixes; his partner Barry Jones' share in their seventh-wicket stand of 70 was a mere 3! In his main role as a bowler, his later career saw some particularly noteworthy performances in one-day cricket. In a Benson & Hedges Cup match against Lancashire in May 1984, he took 6/29 in a losing cause; this was at the time the second-best performance for the county in the competition. And in August of the following year, he claimed 5/25 against Glamorgan in the NatWest Trophy, this time helping Worcestershire to victory. He won the man-of-the-match award on both occasions.

A popular player with the Worcestershire supporters, Inchmore was awarded a benefit season in 1985, which raised over £46,000. He was nearing the end of his career, however, and while he remained at the club for 1986, he played less first-class cricket than he had since the beginning of his time at New Road, though he remained a usual member of the one-day team. His last match for Worcestershire was a John Player Special League game against Derbyshire on 7 September 1986, fittingly at New Road. There was to be no fairy-tale farewell: he took 0/35 from his eight overs and Derbyshire snatched victory thanks to a ninth-wicket partnership of 39.

After that, Inchmore played a season for Wiltshire, making a single List A appearance in the NatWest Trophy against Yorkshire. The first-class county won easily, and Inchmore himself took two expensive wickets (Richard Blakey and Jim Love) and scored 3. He continued to play cricket for charity, and in one such game bowled a delivery which was hit by the batsman with such force that it broke the hand of the fielder, one Eric Clapton, who was lucky not to miss a tour of Japan as a result.
