= Mark Price (cricketer) =

English cricketer

Personal information
- Full name: Mark Richard Price
- Born: 20 April 1960 (age 66); Liverpool, Lancashire, England
- Batting: Right-handed
- Bowling: Slow left-arm orthodox

Domestic team information
- Years: Team
- 1984–1985: Glamorgan

Career statistics
Competition	First-class	List A
Matches	17	11
Runs scored	144	59
Batting average	16.00	9.83
100s/50s	–/–	–/–
Top score	36	22
Balls bowled	1,738	280
Wickets	19	5
Bowling average	42.42	38.00
5 wickets in innings	–	–
10 wickets in match	–	–
Best bowling	4/97	3/22
Catches/stumpings	2/–	2/–
- Source: Cricinfo, 15 November 2011

Mark Richard Price (born 20 April 1960) is a former English cricketer. Price was a right-handed batsman who bowled slow left-arm orthodox. He was born at Liverpool, Lancashire.

Price made his first-class debut for Glamorgan against Gloucestershire in the 1984 County Championship. He made sixteen further first-class appearances for the Welsh county, the last of which came against Sussex in the 1985 County Championship. In his seventeen first-class matches, he took 19 wickets at an average of 42.42, with best figures of 4/97. With the bat, he scored 144 runs at an average of 16.00, with a high score of 36. He made his List A debut for the county against Derbyshire in the 1985 John Player Special League. He made ten further List A appearances for Glamorgan during the 1985 season, the last of which came against Sussex. In his eleven List A appearances, he took 5 wickets at an average of 38.00, with best figures of 3/22. With the bat, he scored 59runs at an average of 9.83, with a high score of 22. He left Glamorgan at the end of that season.

Price also played in the Lancashire League for Ramsbottom Cricket Club between 1977 and 2003.
