= Simon Legg =

English cricketer (born 1966)

Personal information
- Full name: Simon Jonathan Legg
- Born: 24 June 1966 (age 60); Yeovil, Somerset, England
- Batting: Right-handed
- Role: Wicketkeeper

Domestic team information
- Years: Team
- 1989–1991 & 1994: Dorset

Career statistics
Competition	LA
Matches	1
Runs scored	66
Batting average	66.00
100s/50s	–/1
Top score	66
Balls bowled	–
Wickets	–
Bowling average	–
5 wickets in innings	–
10 wickets in match	–
Best bowling	–
Catches/stumpings	–/–
- Source: Cricinfo, 22 March 2010

Simon Jonathan Legg (born 24 June 1966) is a former English cricketer. Legg was a right-handed batsman who played primarily as a wicketkeeper.

Legg made his debut for Dorset in the 1989 Minor Counties Championship against Buckinghamshire. He represented Dorset in 8 Minor Counties Championship matches from 1989 to 1994, with his final Minor Counties match for Dorset coming against Shropshire.

In 1989, he made his only List-A appearance for Dorset against Kent in the 1st round of the 1989 NatWest Trophy. Legg scored what would be his only List-A half century with a score of 66.
