= Ian Philip =

Scottish cricketer (born 1958)

Iain Philip
Personal information
- Born: 9 June 1958 (age 68); Falkirk, Scotland
- Batting: Right-handed

Career statistics
Competition	ODI
Matches	3
Runs scored	20
Batting average	6.66
100s/50s	0/0
Top score	17
Catches/stumpings	4/–
- Source: ESPNcricinfo, 19 April 2007

Iain Lindsay Philip (born 9 June 1958) is a Scottish former cricketer. He played cricket between 1986 and 1999. He made his One-day International debut in 1999 at the age of 41 against Australia.

During his cricket-playing career he made 104 appearances for the Scottish cricket team, more than any other player, became the highest-scoring Scottish batsman, and scored more runs than any other batsman in a single innings (234 in 1991).
