= Keith Hardie (cricketer) =

Scottish cricketer

Personal information
- Full name: Keith Millar Hardie
- Born: 13 May 1947 (age 79); Larbert, Stirlingshire, Scotland
- Batting: Right-handed
- Bowling: Slow left-arm orthodox
- Relatives: Brian Hardie (brother)

Domestic team information
- Years: Team
- 1966–1976: Scotland

Career statistics
Competition	First-class
Matches	10
Runs scored	158
Batting average	22.57
100s/50s	0/1
Top score	65*
Balls bowled	1,534
Wickets	35
Bowling average	17.88
5 wickets in innings	0
10 wickets in match	0
Best bowling	4/23
Catches/stumpings	1/–
- Source: Cricinfo, 11 July 2022

Keith Millar Hardie (born 13 May 1947) is a Scottish former first-class cricketer.

The son of John Millar Hardie, he was born in May 1947, at Larbert, Stirlingshire. He was educated there at Larbert High School. A club cricketer for Stenhousemuir Cricket Club, Hardie made his debut for Scotland in first-class cricket against Ireland at Edinburgh in 1966. He played first-class cricket for Scotland until 1976, making ten appearances. Playing as an all-rounder in the Scottish side, Hardie scored 158 runs at an average of 22.57; he made one half century, a score of 65 not out against Ireland in his final first-class match. As a slow left-arm orthodox bowler, he took 35 wickets at a bowling average of 17.88, with best figures of 4 for 23. His brother, Brian, had a lengthy career in county cricket with Essex.
