= Ian Lawrence (cricketer) =

English cricketer (born 1963)

Personal information
- Full name: Ian Seth Lawrence
- Born: 11 April 1963 (age 63); Ely, Cambridgeshire, England
- Batting: Left-handed

Domestic team information
- Years: Team
- 1985–1991: Cambridgeshire

Career statistics
Competition	List A
Matches	4
Runs scored	78
Batting average	19.50
100s/50s	–/1
Top score	74
Balls bowled	–
Wickets	–
Bowling average	–
5 wickets in innings	–
10 wickets in match	–
Best bowling	–
Catches/stumpings	–/–
- Source: Cricinfo, 24 March 2011

Ian Seth Lawrence (born 11 April 1963) is a former English cricketer. Lawrence is a left-handed batsman. He was born in Ely, Cambridgeshire.

Lawrence made his debut for Cambridgeshire in the 1985 Minor Counties Championship against Norfolk. He played for Cambridgeshire in Minor counties cricket from 1985 to 1991. He made his List A debut for the county against Yorkshire in the 1986 NatWest Trophy and played a further three List A matches to 1989, with the last coming against Worcestershire in the 1989 competition. In four List A matches he scored 78 runs at a batting average of 19.50, including a high score of 74 against Worcestershire in 1989.
