= David Gorman (cricketer) =

English cricketer

Personal information
- Full name: David Brian Gorman
- Born: 13 August 1955 (age 71); Havant, Hampshire, England
- Batting: Right-handed

Domestic team information
- Years: Team
- 1981–1988: Berkshire

Career statistics
Competition	LA
Matches	4
Runs scored	44
Batting average	11.00
100s/50s	–/–
Top score	28
Balls bowled	–
Wickets	–
Bowling average	–
5 wickets in innings	–
10 wickets in match	–
Best bowling	–
Catches/stumpings	–/–
- Source: Cricinfo, 21 September 2010

David Brian Gorman (born 13 August 1955) is a former English List A cricketer. A right-handed batsman, he was born at Havant, Hampshire.

Gorman made his Minor Counties Championship debut for Berkshire in 1981 against Buckinghamshire. From 1981 to 1988, he represented the county in 44 Minor Counties Championship matches, the last of which came in the 1996 Championship when Berkshire played Devon. Gorman also played in the MCCA Knockout Trophy for Berkshire. His debut in that competition came in 1984 when Berkshire played Buckinghamshire. From 1984 to 1988, he represented the county in 10 Trophy matches, the last of which came when Berkshire played Oxfordshire in the 1988 MCCA Knockout Trophy. During the 2001 MCCA Knockout Trophy, Gorman played four matches for the combined Channel Islands side, the last of which came against Berkshire. Gorman captained the Channel Islands during these matches.

Additionally, he also played List-A matches for Berkshire. His List-A debut for the county came against Kent in the 1984 NatWest Trophy. From 1984 to 1988, he represented the county in 4 matches, with his final List-A match coming when Berkshire played Yorkshire in the 1988 NatWest Trophy at the Memorial Ground, Finchampstead. In his 4 matches, he scored 44 runs at a batting average of 11.00, with a high score of 28.
