= Brian Hardie =

Scottish cricketer (born 1950)

Personal information
- Full name: Brian Ross Hardie
- Born: 14 January 1950 (age 76); Stenhousemuir, Stirlingshire, Scotland
- Batting: Right-handed
- Bowling: Right-arm medium
- Role: Batsman
- Relatives: Keith Hardie (brother)

Domestic team information
- Years: Team
- 1970–1990: Essex

Career statistics
Competition	First-class	List A
Matches	378	363
Runs scored	18,103	8,806
Batting average	34.22	29.55
100s/50s	27/89	6/51
Top score	162	119*
Balls bowled	282	77
Wickets	3	2
Bowling average	84.66	20.00
5 wickets in innings	0	0
10 wickets in match	0	0
Best bowling	2/39	1/4
Catches/stumpings	349/–	107/–
- Source: Cricinfo, 25 May 2020

Brian Ross Hardie (born 14 January 1950) was a professional cricket player who played for Essex County Cricket Club and Scotland between 1970 and 1990.

Born in Stenhousemuir, Falkirk, Scotland, to Fettes-educated banker James Millar Hardie, he played at Stenhousemuir during the 1960s and 1970s, scoring 7065 runs before being signed for Essex where he opened the batting for many years alongside Graham Gooch. Overall he passed 1000 runs eleven times, helping the county to victory in four County Championships in eight seasons and three one-day titles from seven final appearances. In the 1985 NatWest Trophy final he made 110 and won the Man-of-the-Match award in Essex's one-run victory at Lord's.

He is the brother of Scottish international cricketer Keith Hardie.
