= John Elder (cricketer) =

Cricket information
- Batting: Right-handed
- Bowling: Right-arm fast-medium

Career statistics
Competition	First-class	List A
Matches	9	1
Runs scored	36	0
Batting average	6.00	0.00
100s/50s	0/0	0/0
Top score	11*	0
Balls bowled	938	60
Wickets	14	2
Bowling average	24.07	34.50
5 wickets in innings	0	0
10 wickets in match	0	0
Best bowling	3/56	2/69
Catches/stumpings	7/–	0/–
- Source: CricketArchive, 30 December 2021

John Watson George Elder (born 16 August 1949) is a former Irish cricketer.

A right-handed batsman and right-arm fast-medium bowler, he made his debut for the Ireland cricket team against Wales in June 1973, and went on to play for Ireland on 37 occasions, his last game also coming against Wales in August 1987.

Of his matches for Ireland, nine had first-class status, all but one of these was against Scotland, the other was against Sri Lanka. He played just one List A match, a NatWest Trophy match against Sussex in July 1985. In all matches for Ireland, he scored 80 runs at an average of 5.33 with a top score of 28 against Wales in August 1979. He took 70 wickets at an average of 24.67, with best bowling figures of 6/29 against Denmark in July 1978.

After his playing career ended, he served as a national selector and as chairman of the Irish Cricket Union's cricket committee. He also served as the tournament referee for the 1999 European Under-19 Championship tournament.

John currently is managing editor and webmaster of the CricketEurope website, a website that covers cricket beyond the ten Test playing nations. He also lectured in computer science at the Queen's University of Belfast.
