= Neil Taylor (cricketer, born 1964) =

English former cricketer

Personal information
- Full name: Neil Raymond Taylor
- Born: 9 February 1964 (age 62); Boscombe, Hampshire, England
- Batting: Right-handed
- Bowling: Right-arm medium-fast

Domestic team information
- Years: Team
- 1990: Middlesex
- 1989–1992: Minor Counties
- 1987–1992: Dorset (squad no. deliveries = balls)

Career statistics
Competition	FC	LA
Matches	2	22
Runs scored	0	45
Batting average	0.00	9.00
100s/50s	–/–	–/–
Top score	0	14
Balls bowled	222	1,265
Wickets	4	24
Bowling average	32.75	36.41
5 wickets in innings	–	–
10 wickets in match	–	–
Best bowling	3/44	3/38
Catches/stumpings	1/–	2/–
- Source: Cricinfo, 21 March 2010

Neil Raymond Taylor (born 9 February 1964) is a former English cricketer who played for Dorset. Taylor was a right-handed batsman who bowled right-arm medium-fast.

Taylor made his debut for Dorset in the 1987 Minor Counties Championship against Devon. From 1987 to 1993, Taylor represented Dorset in 42 Minor Counties Championship matches, with his final Minor Counties appearance for the county coming against Wales Minor Counties.

In 1989, Taylor made his List-A debut for Dorset in the 1989 NatWest Trophy against Kent. From 1989 to 1991, Taylor played 3 List-A matches for the county, with his final List-A match coming against Lancashire in the 1st round of the 1991 NatWest Trophy.

Also in 1989, Taylor made his List-A debut for the combined Minor Counties team against Yorkshire in the 1989 Benson and Hedges Cup. Taylor represented the Minor Counties in 14 List-A matches from 1989 to 1992, with his final List-A match for the team coming against Gloucestershire in the 1992 Benson and Hedges Cup. In his 14 List-A matches for the Minor Counties, Taylor took 18 wickets at a bowling average of 30.44, with best figures of 3–38.

In 1990 Taylor played a single first-class match for the Minor Counties against the touring Indians, a team which featured the likes of Sachin Tendulkar and Anil Kumble. During the match, Taylor took the wicket of Mohammad Azharuddin.

Taylor also made his debut for Middlesex in 1990, playing a single first-class match for the county against Hampshire. Taylor also made his List-A debut for Middlesex in the 1990 season against Kent. Taylor played 5 List-A matches for Middlesex in the 1990 season, with his final List-A match for the county coming against Yorkshire.

Taylor played a combined total of 22 List-A matches in his career, during which time he took 24 wickets at an average of 36.41 and with best bowling figures of 3/38.

Neil & his younger brother Steve (Left Arm Spinner) played together for New Milton CC (New Forest Area) in the Southern League
