= Enda McDermott =

Irish cricketer

Personal information
- Full name: Enda Anthony McDermott
- Born: 1 December 1945 (age 80); Dublin, County Dublin, Ireland
- Batting: Left-handed

International information
- National side: Ireland

Domestic team information
- Years: Team
- 1982: Ireland

Career statistics
Competition	First-class	List A
Matches	1	1
Runs scored	18	9
Batting average	9.00	9.00
100s/50s	–/–	–/–
Top score	18	9
Balls bowled	–	–
Wickets	–	–
Bowling average	–	–
5 wickets in innings	–	–
10 wickets in match	–	–
Best bowling	–	–
Catches/stumpings	1/–	–/–
- Source: CricketArchive, 26 January 2011

Enda Anthony McDermott (born 1 December 1945) is a former Irish cricketer. McDermott was a left-handed batsman. He was born in Dublin, County Dublin.

McDermott made a single first-class appearance for Ireland in 1982 against Scotland. In his only first-class match he scored 18 runs in two innings, at a batting average of 9.00 and a high score of 18. McDermott later represented Ireland in a single List A match against Northamptonshire in the 1982 NatWest Trophy. He scored just 9 runs in his only List A match, before being dismissed by David Steele.
