= St George's Cricket Ground =

Cricket ground in Telford, Shropshire, England

Coordinates: 52°41′45″N 2°25′49″W

- The Dragons
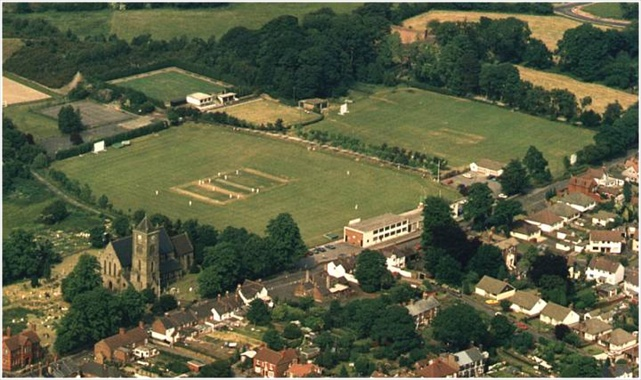
- Aerial view of St.Georges Cricket Club in 1985
- Interactive map of St George's Cricket Ground

Ground information
- Location: Telford, Shropshire
- Country: England
- Establishment: 1922 (first recorded match)

Team information
Shropshire	(1957-1958 & 1967-2001)
- As of 15 August 2010; Source: Ground profile

St George's Cricket Ground is a cricket ground in Telford, Shropshire. The first recorded match on the ground was in 1957, when Shropshire played the Derbyshire Second XI in the ground's first Minor Counties Championship match. From 1957 to present, the ground has hosted 20 Minor Counties Championship matches and 3 MCCA Knockout Trophy matches.

The ground has also held List-A matches. The first List-A match Shropshire played a Yorkshire side that included Geoffrey Boycott in the 1984 NatWest Trophy; a match Shropshire famously won by 37 runs. From 1984 to 2000, the ground held 7 List-A matches, the last of which saw Shropshire play Somerset in the 2000 NatWest Trophy.

In local domestic cricket, St George's Cricket Ground is the home ground of St.Georges Cricket Club, founded in 1922, whose forerunner was St.Georges Bible Class C.C. Today, St. Georges fields four Saturday sides and has a junior section which accepts children from school year 2.
