= Barry Jackson (cricketer) =

English cricketer

Personal information
- Full name: Barry Scott Jackson
- Born: 13 September 1966 (age 60); Maidenhead, Berkshire, England
- Batting: Right-handed
- Bowling: Right-arm medium-fast

Domestic team information
- Years: Team
- 1986–1994: Berkshire

Career statistics
Competition	LA
Matches	4
Runs scored	29
Batting average	9.66
100s/50s	–/–
Top score	14
Balls bowled	276
Wickets	5
Bowling average	34.40
5 wickets in innings	–
10 wickets in match	–
Best bowling	3/38
Catches/stumpings	2/–
- Source: Cricinfo, 22 September 2010

Barry Scott Jackson (born 13 September 1966) is a former English cricketer. Jackson was a right-handed batsman who bowled right-arm medium-fast. He was born at Maidenhead, Berkshire.

Jackson made his Minor Counties Championship debut for Berkshire in 1989 against Buckinghamshire. From 1989 to 1994, he represented the county in 16 Minor Counties Championship matches, the last of which came in the 1994 Championship when Berkshire played Dorset. Jackson also played in the MCCA Knockout Trophy for Berkshire. His debut in that competition came in 1986 when Berkshire played Hertfordshire. From 1986 to 1994, he represented the county in 9 Trophy matches, the last of which came when Berkshire played Buckinghamshire in the 1994 MCCA Knockout Trophy.

Additionally, he also played List-A matches for Berkshire. His List-A debut for the county came against Gloucestershire in the 1986 NatWest Trophy. From 1986 to 1994, he represented the county in 4 matches, with his final List-A match coming when Berkshire played Kent in the 1994 NatWest Trophy at the Memorial Ground, Finchampstead. In his 4 matches, he scored 29 runs at a batting average of 9.66, with a high score of 14.
