= Richard Williams (cricketer, born 1957) =

Welsh cricketer (born 1957)

Richard Grenville Williams is a Welsh former cricketer active from 1974 to 1992 who played for Northamptonshire (Northants). He was born in Bangor, Caernarvonshire on 10 August 1957. He appeared in 284 first-class matches as a righthanded batsman who bowled off spin. He scored 11,817 runs with a highest score of 175 not out, one of eighteen centuries, and took 376 wickets with a best performance of seven for 73.

A highlight of his career was winning the 1980 Benson & Hedges Cup with Northamptonshire. Williams was man of the match in the semi-final, scoring 73 not out and taking two for 24 against Middlesex. He was less fortunate in 1987 when the county lost narrowly in the final of the same tournament to Yorkshire, in spite of Williams taking three wickets and sharing a partnership of 120 with David Capel. (Later that season Williams also played as Northamptonshire lost the final of the NatWest Trophy to Nottinghamshire.) He was part of an "English Counties XI" tour of Zimbabwe in 1984-5.
