= Keith Pont =

English cricketer (born 1953)

Keith Rupert Pont (born 16 January 1953) is a former first-class cricketer who played for Essex from 1970 to 1986. He was born at Wanstead in London.

A 6-foot 2 inch seam bowling all rounder, he scored 6558 runs in 198 first-class games, with a best of 125* against Glamorgan among his 7 centuries, and took 96 wickets with a best of 5 for 17. He scored another 2894 runs and claimed 146 wickets in 249 one-day games. His brother, Ian Pont, also played for the county. He went on to become director of development at the England and Wales Cricket Board until 2005, and has since worked in sports goods marketing.
