= David Snodgrass =

Scottish cricketer

Personal information
- Full name: David Lang Snodgrass
- Born: 21 November 1958 (age 67); Glasgow, Lanarkshire, Scotland
- Batting: Right-handed
- Bowling: Right-arm medium

Domestic team information
- Years: Team
- 1982–1989: Scotland

Career statistics
| Competition | First-class | List A |
|---|---|---|
| Matches | 5 | 16 |
| Runs scored | 91 | 130 |
| Batting average | 15.16 | 10.00 |
| 100s/50s | –/– | –/– |
| Top score | 49 | 28 |
| Balls bowled | 360 | 300 |
| Wickets | 5 | 7 |
| Bowling average | 27.80 | 32.42 |
| 5 wickets in innings | – | – |
| 10 wickets in match | – | – |
| Best bowling | 2/26 | 3/44 |
| Catches/stumpings | 6/– | 5/– |
- Source: Cricinfo, 15 June 2022

David Lang Snodgrass (born 21 November 1958) is a Scottish former cricketer.

Snodgrass was born at Glasgow in November 1958. He was educated at Hyndland Secondary School, before attending Glasgow College of Technology. A club cricketer for the West of Scotland Cricket Club, he made his debut for Scotland in a List A one-day match against English county opponents Lancashire in the 1982 Benson & Hedges Cup. Later that season he made his first-class debut against Ireland at Edinburgh; he played first-class cricket for Scotland until 1989, making five appearances all against Ireland. In one-day cricket, he played until 1989, making 16 appearances in the Benson & Hedges Cup and the NatWest Trophy. In his five first-class matches, he scored 91 runs with a highest score of 49, while with his medium pace bowling he took 5 wickets at an average of 27.80. In one-day cricket he scored 130 runs with a highest score of 28, while with the ball he took 7 wickets at an average of 32.42, with best figures of 3 for 44. Outside of cricket, he worked in the IT industry.
