= Edward Cunningham (cricketer) =

English cricketer

Personal information
- Full name: Edward James Cunningham
- Born: 16 May 1962 (age 64); Oxford, England
- Batting: Left-handed
- Bowling: Right-arm Off spin
- Role: Batsman

Domestic team information
- Years: Team
- 1982–1984: Gloucestershire

Career statistics
Competition	FC	List A
Matches	14	17
Runs scored	271	349
Batting average	15.94	26.84
100s/50s	0/1	0/2
Top score	61 not out	56
Balls bowled	444	48
Wickets	4	0
Bowling average	66.00	n/a
5 wickets in innings	0	0
10 wickets in match	0	0
Best bowling	2-55	0-35
Catches/stumpings	4/0
- Source: Cricinfo, 25 August 2015

Edward Cunningham (born 16 May 1962) is a former English cricketer. He played for Gloucestershire between 1982 and 1984.

== Career ==
Ed Cunningham was born on 16 May 1962 at Oxford and was educated at Marlborough College. He comes from an illustrious cricketing family; both his uncle, F.G. Mann and great-uncle, F.T. Mann captained England. Cunningham was a middle order or opening batsman and made his first-class debut for Gloucestershire against the Indians in 1982. In all he played in 14 first-class games for the county, scoring 271 runs at an average of 15.94. His highest score, 61 not out against the Sri Lankans was his sole first-class half century.

Cunningham was more successful in limited-overs cricket, particularly when he was promoted to open the Gloucestershire innings during the 1984 season. In 17 List A matches he scored 349 runs at an average of 26.84 with two fifties, the highest being 56 against Leicestershire at Grace Road in the John Player Special League in 1984.

He was also an occasional right-arm off break bowler. His best first-class bowling was 2 for 55 against Worcestershire at Worcester in 1983.
