= Geoff Holmes =

Welsh cricketer

Geoffrey Clarke Holmes (16 September 1958 – 23 March 2009) was a Welsh cricketer and a director of the Cricket Board of Wales. He was Glamorgan's player of the year in 1988.

Holmes joined Glamorgan after serving on the MCC groundstaff and made his first appearance for the county in 1978. He made runs consistently between 1984 and 1988, passing 1,000 runs four times and 900 twice. He hit two of his eleven career hundreds against Somerset in the same match in 1988. He played one season with Border in South Africa and proved highly successful, making 563 runs at 67.55, including his best score of 182.

In his 209 first-class matches, Holmes compiled 8,092 runs at a steady pace at 28.49; he also took 88 wickets with his right arm medium pacers. He was perhaps at his best in one day cricket, with his excellent ground fielding adding to his 3643 runs at 25.47 and 136 wickets at 25.68, including a remarkable spell of 5 for 2 in the Sunday League against Derbyshire in 1984.

A back injury forced Holmes into retirement in 1991 after his benefit. After retiring, he worked for a building society in South Wales; Holmes also coached young cricketers for his local club in Cardiff. He became a Cricket Board of Wales director in 2005. Holmes died on 23 March 2009.
