= 1992 English cricket season =

The 1992 English cricket season was the 93rd in which the County Championship had been an official competition. Essex won a second successive Britannic Assurance title. Durham entered the Championship for the first time. This was the first time that a new county had been admitted to the championship for 71 years since Glamorgan in 1921. Pakistan defeated England 2–1 in the Test series.

== Honours ==
- County Championship - Essex
- NatWest Trophy - Northamptonshire
- Sunday League - Middlesex
- Benson & Hedges Cup - Hampshire
- Minor Counties Championship - Staffordshire
- MCCA Knockout Trophy - Devon
- Second XI Championship - Surrey II
- Wisden - Nigel Briers, Martyn Moxon, Ian Salisbury, Alec Stewart, Wasim Akram

== Annual reviews ==
- Playfair Cricket Annual 1993
- Wisden Cricketers' Almanack 1993
