= Jack Ker =

Scottish cricketer and cricket administrator

Personal information
- Full name: John Edward Ker
- Born: 17 October 1952 (age 74); Kelso, Roxburghshire, Scotland
- Batting: Right-handed
- Bowling: Right-arm medium
- Relatives: Andrew Ker (brother)

Domestic team information
- Years: Team
- 1977–1988: Scotland

Career statistics
Competition	First-class	List A
Matches	12	24
Runs scored	189	144
Batting average	21.00	9.60
100s/50s	–/1	–/–
Top score	50	31
Balls bowled	1,231	1,062
Wickets	19	22
Bowling average	25.36	31.36
5 wickets in innings	–	–
10 wickets in match	–	–
Best bowling	4/54	3/29
Catches/stumpings	3/–	2/–
- Source: Cricinfo, 15 June 2022

John Edward Ker (born 17 October 1952) is a Scottish former cricketer and administrator.

Ker was born at Kelso in October 1952, where he was educated at Kelso High School before going up to Jordanhill College of Education. A club cricketer for Kelso Cricket Club, Ker made his debut for Scotland in a first-class match against Ireland at Dublin in 1977. He played first-class cricket for Scotland until 1988, with ten of his appearances coming against Ireland; the other two came against the touring New Zealanders in 1978 and the touring Sri Lankans the following year. A bowling all-rounder, Ker scored 189 runs at an average of 21.00 in first-class cricket, with a highest score of 50. With his right-arm medium pace bowling, he took 19 wickets at a bowling average of 25.36, with best figures of 4 for 54. In addition to playing first-class cricket for Scotland, Ker also appeared in List A one-day matches for them on 24 occasions between 1980 and 1988 in the Benson & Hedges Cup and the NatWest Trophy. He scored 144 runs in one-day cricket, with a highest score of 31. With the ball, he took 22 wickets at an average of 31.36, with best figures of 3 for 29.

Ker was appointed President of Cricket Scotland in 2012, a role he held until 2013. He has also served as president of Kelso Cricket Club. Outside of cricket, Ker was a schoolteacher before working in the insurance industry, His brother is the former cricketer and rugby union international Andrew Ker.
