= Stuart Fletcher (cricketer) =

English cricketer

Stuart David Fletcher (born 8 June 1964, in Keighley, Yorkshire, England) is an English first-class cricketer, who played for Yorkshire County Cricket Club from 1983 to 1991, and Lancashire from 1992 to 1994. He also appeared for Lincolnshire in the Minor Counties Championship in both 1994 and 1995.

A right arm medium pacer and right-handed lower order bat, Fletcher played in 114 first-class matches, 107 for Yorkshire and seven for Lancashire, taking 240 wickets at 34.89, with a best of 8 for 58 against Essex. He scored 476 first-class runs at an average of 7.43, with a top score of 28 not out against Kent. In 132 one day games, he took 166 wickets at 29.06, with a best of 4 for 11 against Kent. He scored 127 runs in these games, at an average of just over 9. He took 2 for 37 to help Yorkshire win the Benson and Hedges Cup final in 1987, against Nottinghamshire.

He continued to play league cricket after his retirement from the first-class game for Elland C.C., and is currently in charge of youth coaching at Brighouse C.C. in the Bradford League.
