= West Indian cricket team in England in 1984 =

International cricket tour

West Indies Cricket Flag Pre 1999

In 1984 the West Indies cricket team toured England, playing three One Day Internationals and five Tests. West Indies beat England 2–1 in the ODI series, then whitewashed England 5–0 in the Test series, and as of 2023 this was the only instance England faced such whitewash at home. This was the only test series where the home side lost all tests of a 4 or more match series. The West Indies team was captained by Clive Lloyd throughout, and England by David Gower.

== West Indies touring squad ==
The West Indies named their 16-man squad to tour England during their Test series with Australia, it included two uncapped players - batsman Thelston Payne who could cover as reserve wicket-keeper and fast bowler Courtney Walsh. Fast bowlers Andy Roberts and Winston Davis were the most notable omissions.

Milton Small returned home during the tour after sustaining a knee injury, with Davis who had been playing county cricket with Glamorgan replacing him.

Name	Birth date	Domestic team	Batting Style	Bowling Style	Test caps
Batsmen
Clive Lloyd (c)	31 August 1944 (aged 39)	Guyana	Left-handed	Right arm medium pace	100
Larry Gomes	13 July 1953 (aged 30)	Trinidad and Tobago	Left-handed	Right arm off-spin	35
Gordon Greenidge	1 May 1951 (aged 33)	Barbados	Right-handed	Right arm medium pace	52
Desmond Haynes	15 February 1956 (aged 28)	Barbados	Right-handed	—	40
Gus Logie	28 September 1960 (aged 23)	Trinidad and Tobago	Right-handed	Right arm off-spin	9
Viv Richards (vc)	7 March 1952 (aged 32)	Leeward Islands	Right-handed	Right arm off-spin	63
Richie Richardson	12 January 1962 (aged 22)	Leeward Islands	Right-handed	Right arm medium pace	6
Wicket-keepers
Jeff Dujon	28 May 1956 (aged 27)	Jamaica	Right-handed	—	19
Thelston Payne	13 February 1957 (aged 27)	Barbados	Left-handed	—	0
All-rounders
Eldine Baptiste	12 March 1960 (aged 24)	Leeward Islands	Right-handed	Right arm fast-medium	4
Roger Harper	17 March 1963 (aged 21)	Guyana	Right-handed	Right arm off-spin	6
Bowlers
Joel Garner	16 December 1952 (aged 31)	Barbados	Right-handed	Right arm fast	37
Michael Holding	16 February 1954 (aged 30)	Jamaica	Right-handed	Right arm fast	45
Malcolm Marshall	15 April 1958 (aged 26)	Barbados	Right-handed	Right arm fast	27
Milton Small	12 February 1964 (aged 20)	Barbados	Right-handed	Right arm fast-medium	1
Courtney Walsh	30 October 1962 (aged 21)	Jamaica	Right-handed	Right arm fast	0

- The ages and Test caps are as at the start of the tour (19 May 1984).

== One Day Internationals (ODIs) ==
The West Indies won the Texaco Trophy 2–1.

=== 1st ODI ===
31 May 1984
Scorecard

West Indies; 272/9 (55 overs)	v	England; 168 (50 overs)
IVA Richards 189* (170); G Miller 3/32 (11 overs)		AJ Lamb 75 (89); J Garner 3/18 (8 overs)

West Indies won by 104 runs
Old Trafford, Manchester
Umpires: DJ Constant and DR Shepherd
Player of the match: IVA Richards (WIN)

- West Indies won the toss and elected to bat.
- TA Lloyd (ENG) made his ODI debut.

=== 2nd ODI ===
2 June 1984
Scorecard

West Indies; 179 (48.3 overs)	v	England; 180/7 (47.5 overs)
CH Lloyd 52 (66); DR Pringle 3/21 (10 overs)		TA Lloyd 49 (103); MA Holding 2/29 (8.5 overs)

England won by 3 wickets
Trent Bridge, Nottingham
Umpires: HD Bird and DO Oslear
Player of the match: DR Pringle (ENG)

- England won the toss and elected to field.
- The match was reduced before play started from 55 to 50 overs per side.

=== 3rd ODI ===
4 June 1984
Scorecard

England; 196/9 (55 overs)	v	West Indies; 197/2 (46.5 overs)
TA Lloyd 37 (83); MD Marshall 3/38 (11 overs)		IVA Richards 84* (65); G Miller 1/35 (9 overs)

West Indies won by 8 wickets
Lord's, London
Umpires: DGL Evans and BJ Meyer
Player of the match: RA Harper (WIN)

- West Indies won the toss and elected to field.

The three ODIs were played on 31 May, 2 June and 4 June. West Indies won the First ODI at Old Trafford comfortably, thanks to a huge 189* scored by Viv Richards. England bowled West Indies out for 179 in the Second ODI at Trent Bridge, and levelled the series 1–1, but West Indies restricted England to 196 runs in the deciding Third ODI at Lord's and won easily, by 8 wickets.

== Test matches ==
The Test series was a historic 5-0 "blackwash" to West Indies, with victories by wide margins in all 5 Tests.

=== First Test ===
14 – 18 June 1984
(5-day match)
Scorecard

England	v	West Indies
191 (59.3 overs); IT Botham 64 (82); J Garner 4/53 (14.3 overs)		606 (143 overs); HA Gomes 143 (279); DR Pringle 5/108 (31 overs)
235 (76.5 overs); PR Downton 56 (187); J Garner 5/55 (23.5 overs)

West Indies won by an innings and 180 runs
Edgbaston, Birmingham
Umpires: HD Bird and BJ Meyer
Player of the match: HA Gomes (WIN)

- England won the toss and elected to bat.
- 17 June was taken as a rest day.
- The match was scheduled for five days but completed in four.
- TA Lloyd (ENG) made his Test debut.

England won the toss and decided to bat. Half an hour into the opening session, debutant opening batsman Andy Lloyd was hit on the head by a short-pitched ball bowled by Malcolm Marshall. Lloyd left the field and spent several days in hospital; he did not play cricket again in 1984 and never played another Test Match. England were soon in trouble on 89–5, but Ian Botham hit 64 and England reached a total of 191, with Joel Garner taking 4–53.

West Indies reached 606 in reply, with five batsmen (and extras) reaching half-centuries. Top scorers were Larry Gomes (143) and Viv Richards (117), who shared a third-wicket stand of 206. Richards also became the fourth West Indian batsman to pass 5,000 runs in Tests. Captain Clive Lloyd scored 71, and the West Indian tail-enders were also in the runs, with number 9 Eldine Baptiste (87*) and number 10 Michael Holding (69) sharing a 9th wicket stand of 150. Derek Pringle took 5–108, one of four England bowlers to concede over 100 runs.

Despite 56 by wicketkeeper Paul Downton, promoted to makeshift opening batsman in the absence of Andy Lloyd, England were unable to save the match, losing on the fourth day, with another 5-55 for Garner.

=== Second Test ===
28 June – 3 July 1984
(5-day match)
Scorecard

England	v	West Indies
286 (105.5 overs); G Fowler 106 (259); MD Marshall 6/85 (36.5 overs)		245 (65.4 overs); IVA Richards 72 (94); IT Botham 8/103 (27.4 overs)
300/9d (98.3 overs); AJ Lamb 110 (260); MA Small 3/40 (12 overs)		344/1 (66.1 overs); CG Greenidge 214* (242)

West Indies won by 9 wickets
Lord's, London
Umpires: DGL Evans and BJ Meyer
Player of the match: IT Botham (ENG) and CG Greenidge (WIN)

- West Indies won the toss and elected to field.
- 1 July was taken as a rest day.
- BC Broad (ENG) made his Test debut.

West Indies won the toss and put England in to bat. The decision looked poor after a century opening stand, and England reached 286, with opening batsmen Graeme Fowler (106) and debutant Chris Broad (55) top scorers, and extras third on 35. Marshall took 6-85.

England took a first-innings lead when the West Indies were dismissed for 245, with Botham taking 8–103. This was the first occasion that an Englishman had taken 8 wickets against West Indies in England. Clive Lloyd scored a modest 39, becoming the second West Indian batsman to pass 7,000 Test runs. In England's second innings, Allan Lamb scored 110 and Botham 81, and England declared at 300-9 early on the fifth day.

West Indies achieved the target of 342 runs to win with ease, in 66.1 overs, losing only one wicket, thanks to an unbroken stand of 287 between Gordon Greenidge (214*) and Gomes (92*).

=== Third Test ===
12 – 16 July 1984
(5-day match)
Scorecard

England	v	West Indies
270 (97.2 overs); AJ Lamb 100 (186); MA Holding 4/70 (29.2 overs)		302 (73.5 overs); HA Gomes 104* (197); PJW Allott 6/61 (26.5 overs)
159 (65 overs); G Fowler 50 (128); MD Marshall 7/53 (26 overs)		131/2 (32.3 overs); CG Greenidge 49 (96); NGB Cook 2/27 (9 overs)

West Indies won by 8 wickets
Headingley, Leeds
Umpires: DJ Constant and DGL Evans
Player of the match: HA Gomes (WIN)

- England won the toss and elected to bat.
- 15 July was taken as a rest day.
- The match was scheduled for five days but completed in four.
- VP Terry (ENG) made his Test debut.

England won the toss and batted first again for the third Test running. Lamb reached 100 as England were all out for 270, and 4-70 for Holding. In the process, Holding became the second West Indian to take 200 Test wickets. The West Indies secured a narrow first-innings lead, reaching 302, with 104* to Gomes, and Holding second-highest on 59. Paul Allott took 6–61.

England were bowled out cheaply in their second innings, for 159, with Marshall taking 7–53, his best career bowling analysis to date (notwithstanding a thumb broken in two places), and West Indies reached their victory target with 8 wickets in hand.

Batsman Paul Terry made his Test debut for England, but scored only 8 and 1. This was the last Test played by Bob Willis.

=== Fourth Test ===
26 – 31 July 1984
(5-day match)
Scorecard

West Indies	v	England
500 (160.3 overs); CG Greenidge 223 (425); PI Pocock 4/121 (45.3 overs)		280 (105.2 overs); AJ Lamb 100* (185); J Garner 4/51 (22.2 overs)
		156 (f/o) (66.4 overs); DI Gower 57* (153); RA Harper 6/57 (28.4 overs)

West Indies won by an innings and 64 runs
Old Trafford, Manchester
Umpires: HD Bird and DO Oslear
Player of the match: CG Greenidge (WIN)

- West Indies won the toss and elected to bat.
- 29 July was taken as a rest day.

West Indies won the toss and batted first for the first time in the series. By the close of the second day, they had reached 500 all out, with a second double century for Greenidge (223) and a century for wicketkeeper Jeff Dujon (101). Veteran off-spinner Pat Pocock, recalled for the match, achieved England's best bowling figures, 4–121.

In England's reply, their number 3 batsman, Paul Terry, playing in his second match for England, had scored 7 runs when he was struck by a ball bowled by Winston Davis. His arm was broken, and he left the field. England lost its ninth wicket with 278 runs on the board, needing 23 runs to save the follow-on. Terry returned with his arm in plaster and hanging by a sling. He watched Allan Lamb reach his century, but was then unable to defend his wicket, bowled without adding to his score by Joel Garner, his fourth wicket (4–51). England had reached 280, with Lamb again top scorer on 100*, his third century in consecutive Test matches, and extras second highest, on 44.

England were made to follow on, and were bowled out for 156, Roger Harper's off spin taking 6–57. Terry did not bat for England again.

=== Fifth Test ===
9 – 14 August 1984
(5-day match)
Scorecard

West Indies	v	England
190 (70 overs); CH Lloyd 60* (112); IT Botham 5/72 (23 overs)		162 (61.5 overs); G Fowler 31 (51); MD Marshall 5/35 (17.5 overs)
346 (96.3 overs); DL Haynes 125 (329); RM Ellison 3/60 (26 overs)		202 (69.4 overs); IT Botham 54 (51); MA Holding 5/43 (13 overs)

West Indies won by 172 runs
The Oval, London
Umpires: DJ Constant and BJ Meyer
Player of the match: DL Haynes (WIN)

- West Indies won the toss and elected to bat.
- 12 August was taken as a rest day.
- JP Agnew and RM Ellison (both ENG) made their Test debuts.

In the final Test, West Indies won the toss again, and again decided to bat. England bowlers Jonathan Agnew and Richard Ellison made their debuts, and England achieved rare penetration with the ball, reducing West Indies to 70–6. Clive Lloyd scored 60*, to bring them to a more respectable total of 190 all out before the close on the first day. Botham took 5–72, becoming the first cricketer to reach the all-rounders "triple double" of 300 wickets and 3,000 runs in Tests.

England's batsmen were unable to capitalise on the relative success of their bowlers. They were bowled out for 162, with only Fowler scoring more than 20, Marshall taking 5–35. West Indies piled on the runs in their second innings, reaching 346, with a century to Desmond Haynes (125). Needing to score 375 to win, England subsided to 202 all out, with Botham top scorer on 54. Garner (4–51) and Holding (5–43) taking 9 wickets between them. On the final day, Pocock was the fourth Test cricketer to be dismissed for a "pair" in consecutive matches.

== Legacy ==
West Indies achieved the fifth 5–0 whitewash in Test history, the first (and to date only) whitewash by a touring side in a test series that was longer than three matches, an unusual feat for a series played in England considering its variable summer weather. By the end of the Fifth Test the West Indies had won eight tests in a row and would go on to set the then-record of 11 consecutive wins. This series is generally seen as the height of West Indies' power, and the West Indies would remain the dominant Test nation for the rest of the decade.

== Annual reviews ==
- Playfair Cricket Annual 1985
- Wisden Cricketers' Almanack 1985
