= 1988 Refuge Assurance Cup =

- Administrator(s): Test and County Cricket Board
- Cricket format: Limited overs cricket (40 overs per innings)
- Tournament format(s): Knockout
- Champions: Lancashire (1st title)
- Participants: 4
- Matches: 3
- Most runs: 76 Graeme Hick (Worcestershire)
- Most wickets: 5 Neal Radford (Worcestershire)/Andy Hayhurst (Lancashire)

The 1988 Refuge Assurance Cup was the first competing of the Refuge Assurance Cup, for the most successful teams in the Sunday League. It was an English limited overs county cricket tournament which was held between 7 and 18 September 1988. The tournament was won by Lancashire County Cricket Club who defeated Worcestershire County Cricket Club by 52 runs in the final at Edgbaston, Birmingham.

== Format ==
The cup was an end-of-season affair. The counties finishing in the top four of the 1988 Refuge Assurance League competed in the semi-finals. The top two teams were drawn at home. Winners from the semi-finals then went on to the final at Edgbaston which was held on 18 September 1988.

The cup was played using an orange ball.

=== Semi-finals ===
7 September 1988
(scorecard)

Gloucestershire; 117/9 (40 overs)	v	Lancashire; 121/7 (39.5 overs)
Andy Stovold 40; Jack Simmons 3/14 (8 overs)		Andy Hayhurst 26; Vibert Greene 2/16 (8 overs)

Lancashire won by 3 wickets
County Ground, Bristol
Umpires: John Holder & Nigel Plews
Player of the match: Paul Allott (Lancashire)

7 September 1988
(scorecard)

Middlesex; 146/9 (40 overs)	v	Worcestershire; 147/3 (38.4 overs)
Paul Downton 30 * Neal Radford 4/23 (8 overs)		Graeme Hick 74 * Norman Cowans 1/18 (8 overs)

Worcestershire won by 7 wickets
New Road, Worcester
Umpires: Barry Dudleston & John Hampshire
Player of the match: Graeme Hick (Worcestershire)

=== Final ===
18 September 1988
(scorecard)

Lancashire; 201/5 (40 overs)	v	Worcestershire; 149 all out (35.5 overs)
Trevor Jesty 59; Martin Weston 2/19 (8 overs)		Phil Neale 42; Andy Hayhurst 4/46 (8 overs)

Lancashire won by 52 runs
Edgbaston, Birmingham
Umpires: Jack Birkenshaw & John Holder
Player of the match: Mike Watkinson (Lancashire)

The attendance at the final was 14,616.
