= James Hamblin (cricketer) =

English cricketer

Personal information
- Full name: James Rupert Christopher Hamblin
- Born: 16 August 1978 (age 48); Pembury, Kent, England
- Batting: Right-handed
- Bowling: Right-arm medium
- Relatives: Bryan Hamblin (father)

Domestic team information
- Years: Team
- 2001–2004: Hampshire (squad no. 7)

Career statistics
Competition	FC	LA	T20
Matches	11	48	5
Runs scored	440	656	24
Batting average	27.50	16.82	24.80
100s/50s	–/3	–/2	–/–
Top score	96	61	38
Balls bowled	1,002	1,007	48
Wickets	14	28	7
Bowling average	51.64	32.39	10.14
5 wickets in innings	1	–	–
10 wickets in match	–	–	–
Best bowling	6/93	4/29	3/31
Catches/stumpings	5/–	14/–	1/–
- Source: Cricinfo, 13 August 2009

James Rupert Christopher Hamblin (born 16 August 1978) is an English former cricketer.

The son of the cricketer Bryan Hamblin, he was born at Pembury in August 1978. Hamblin was educated at Charterhouse School, before matriculating to the University of the West of England. While studying at Bristol, he was selected to tour South Africa with the British Universities cricket team in the winter of 1999. He later made his debut in first-class cricket for Hampshire against Warwickshire at Edgbaston in the 2001 County Championship. Hamblin featured infrequently for Hampshire in first-class cricket, making eleven appearances to 2003. Playing as an all-rounder for Hampshire, he scored 440 runs in first-class cricket at an average of 27.50, with three half centuries. With his right-arm medium pace bowling, he took 14 wickets at a bowling average of 51.64, taking one five wicket haul. His best first-class batting and bowling performances came in the same match against Derbyshire in the 2003 County Championship, when he scored 96 and took figures of 6 for 93.

It was as a one-day cricketer that Hamblin was utilised most by Hampshire, making his debut in List A one-day cricket against Worcestershire at the Southampton in the 2001 Norwich Union League. He made a total of 48 appearances in one-day cricket for Hampshire until 2004. He scored 656 runs in one-day cricket, at an average of 16.82; he made two half centuries, with a highest score of 61. With the ball, he took 28 wickets at a bowling average of 32.39, with best figures of 4 for 29. In June 2003, he featured in Hampshire's first-ever Twenty20 match, played against Sussex at Southampton in the Twenty20 Cup. In this match, he became Hampshire's first man-of-the-match in Twenty20 cricket, scoring a 27-ball 34 at the top of the order and sharing in an opening partnership of 66 with Derek Kenway. He made a further four appearances in that season's competition, but did not feature in Twenty20 cricket the following season. He was released by Hampshire at the end of the 2004 season, alongside several other players.

In 2022, he took part in celebrations at Hambledon celebrating 250 years of first-class cricket, alongside Mark Nicholas and the actor Rory Kinnear, amongst others.
