= Aamer Khan =

Pakistani-English cricketer (born 1969)

Personal information
- Full name: Aamer Ali Khan
- Born: 5 November 1969 (age 57); Lahore, Punjab, Pakistan
- Height: 5 ft 10 in (1.78 m)
- Batting: Right-handed
- Bowling: Leg break
- Role: Occasional wicket-keeper

Domestic team information
- Years: Team
- 2001: Cambridgeshire
- 1998/99–2000: Leicestershire
- 1997–1998: Sussex
- 1995: Middlesex
- 1987/1988: Rawalpindi

Career statistics
Competition	First-class	List A
Matches	24	28
Runs scored	337	73
Batting average	14.04	6.08
100s/50s	–/1	–/–
Top score	52	22*
Balls bowled	3,989	1,300
Wickets	48	27
Bowling average	41.85	40.22
5 wickets in innings	1	1
10 wickets in match	–	–
Best bowling	5/137	5/40
Catches/stumpings	9/–	5/–
- Source: Cricinfo, 1 December 2011

Aamer Ali Khan (born 5 November 1969) is a Pakistani born former English cricketer. Khan was a right-handed batsman who bowled leg break. He was born at Lahore, Punjab and was educated at Muslim Model High School and MAO College, Lahore.

Khan made his first-class debut for in his native Pakistan for Rawalpindi against Pakistan Railways at the Pindi Club Ground, Rawalpindi in the 1987/88 Quaid-e-Azam Trophy. In his only match for Rawalpindi, Khan wasn't called upon to bat and bowled four wicketless overs. His next appearance in first-class cricket came back in England in 1995 for Middlesex against Cambridge University. He made two further first-class appearances for Middlesex, both in 1995 against Oxford University and Sussex, with Khan taking a total of 8 wickets in his three matches, at an average of 17.75, with best figures of 4/51. These were his only appearances for Middlesex.

He joined Sussex for the 1997 season, making his debut for the county against Northamptonshire in the County Championship. He followed this up by making his List A debut against the same opposition in the AXA Life League. He played for Sussex in the 1998 and 1999 seasons, making a total of nineteen first-class appearances. In these, he scored a total of 332 runs at a batting average of 14.43, with a high score of 52. This score was his only half century and came against Hampshire in 1997. With the ball, he took 39 wickets at an average of 45.79, with best figures 5/137. These figures represented his only first-class five wicket haul and came against Middlesex in 1997 at Lord's. In List A cricket, Khan made 22 appearances for Sussex. In these, he took 25 wickets at an average 35.48, with best figures of 5/40. These figures were his only List A five wicket haul and came against Kent in 1997. With the bat, he scored a total of 67 runs at an average of 6.70, with a high score of 22 not out.

He was released by Sussex at the end of the 1998 season, but joined Leicestershire for the 1999 season. He made just a single first-class appearance in that season's County Championship against Worcestershire at New Road, Worcester. He scored 5 runs in Leicestershire's first-innings, before being dismissed by Vikram Solanki, while with the ball his only wicket was that of Alamgir Sheriyar, who he had stumped by Paul Nixon. He also made four List A appearances for the county in that season, three of which were against Sri Lanka B in Leicestershire's 1999 tour of Sri Lanka and one against Northamptonshire in the 2000 Norwich Union National League. These matches though came without success, with Khan taking just a single wicket which came at an overall cost of 98 runs. He left Leicestershire at the end of the 2000 season, having not featured during it. He dropped down to Minor counties level for the 2001 season when he joined Cambridgeshire. He made three Minor Counties Championship and four MCCA Knockout Trophy appearances during that season, as well as playing his final two List A matches against the Derbyshire Cricket Board and Somerset, both in the 2001 Cheltenham & Gloucester Trophy.
