= 1990 Refuge Assurance Cup =

- Administrator(s): Test and County Cricket Board
- Cricket format: Limited overs cricket (40 overs per innings)
- Tournament format(s): Knockout
- Champions: Middlesex (1st title)
- Participants: 4
- Matches: 3
- Most runs: 125 Kim Barnett (Derbyshire)
- Most wickets: 4 John Emburey (Middlesex)/Alan Warner (Derbys)/Devon Malcolm (Derbys)

The 1990 Refuge Assurance Cup was the third season of the Refuge Assurance Cup, for the most successful teams in the Sunday League. It was an English limited overs county cricket tournament which was held between 5 and 16 September 1990. The tournament was won by Middlesex who defeated Derbyshire by 5 wickets in the final at Edgbaston, Birmingham.

== Format ==
The cup was an end-of-season affair. The counties finishing in the top four of the 1990 Refuge Assurance League competed in the semi-finals. The top two teams were drawn at home. Winners from the semi-finals then went on to the final at Edgbaston which was held on 16 September 1990.

=== Semi-finals ===
5 September 1990
(scorecard)

Derbyshire; 255/4 (40 overs)	v	Nottinghamshire; 233/8 (40 overs)
Kim Barnett 83; Kevin Saxelby 1/25 (5 overs)		Tim Robinson 96; Alan Warner 2/41 (8 overs)

Derbyshire won by 22 runs
County Ground, Derby
Umpires: Barry Dudleston and Roy Palmer
Player of the match: Tim Robinson (Nottinghamshire)

5 September 1990
(scorecard)

Middlesex; 272/6 (40 overs)	v	Lancashire; 227/7 (40 overs)
Mike Roseberry 86; David Hughes 2/40 (8 overs)		Graham Lloyd 65; John Emburey 4/39 (6 overs)

Middlesex won by 45 runs
Old Trafford, Manchester
Umpires: Dickie Bird & Alan Whitehead
Player of the match: Mike Roseberry (Middlesex)

=== Final ===
16 September 1990
(scorecard)

Derbyshire; 197/7 (40 overs)	v	Middlesex; 201/5 (39.4 overs)
John Morris 46; Paul Weekes 2/35 (8 overs)		Desmond Haynes 49; Devon Malcolm 3/41 (8 overs)

Middlesex won by 5 wickets
Edgbaston, Birmingham
Umpires: David Constant & Mervyn Kitchen
Player of the match: Paul Downton (Middlesex)

The attendance at the final was 7,212.
