= James Schofield (cricketer, born 1978) =

English cricketer

Personal information
- Full name: James Edward Knowle Schofield
- Born: 1 November 1978 (age 48); Blackpool, Lancashire, England
- Batting: Right-handed
- Bowling: Right-arm fast-medium

Domestic team information
- Years: Team
- 2001–2002: Hampshire

Career statistics
Competition	First-class	List A
Matches	4	1
Runs scored	43	–
Batting average	10.75	–
100s/50s	–/–	–/–
Top score	21*	–
Balls bowled	853	36
Wickets	19	1
Bowling average	25.10	22.00
5 wickets in innings	–	–
10 wickets in match	–	–
Best bowling	4/51	1/22
Catches/stumpings	1/–	–/–
- Source: Cricinfo, 7 December 2009

James Edward Knowle Schofield (born 1 November 1978) is an English former cricketer.

Schofield was born at Blackpool in November 1978. Schofield began his career in county cricket with the Worcestershire Cricket Board, representing the Board in the MCCA Knockout Trophy between 1998 and 2000. Having trialled for several county second elevens, Schofield was signed by Hampshire in 2001 after taking 40 wickets for the Hampshire Second XI in six matches. He made his debut for Hampshire in a first-class match against the touring Australians at the Rose Bowl, taking the wicket of Matthew Hayden with his first ball. He would make three further first-class appearances for Hampshire, playing twice in the 2001 County Championship against Durham and Worcestershire, and once in the 2002 County Championship against Surrey. Schofield took 19 wickets in his four first-class matches with his right-arm fast-medium bowling, at an average of 25.10 and with best figures of 4 for 10. He also made a single List A one-day appearance for Hampshire against Worcestershire at Worcester in the 2001 Norwich Union League. He also took a wicket with his first ball in this match, when he dismissed Anurag Singh, achieving the rare feat of taking a wicket with his first deliveries in both first-class and List A cricket. Schofield was released by Hampshire at the end of the 2002 season, alongside Jason Laney and Irfan Shah.

In 2013, Schofield made a return to cricket for the small village club side of Easton and Martyr Worthy in Hampshire. He was later appointed bowling coach for the women's cricket team Southern Vipers in the Women's Cricket Super League.
