= 1991 Refuge Assurance Cup =

- Administrator(s): Test and County Cricket Board
- Cricket format: Limited overs cricket (40 overs per innings)
- Tournament format(s): Knockout
- Champions: Worcestershire (1st title)
- Participants: 4
- Matches: 3
- Most runs: 152 Steve Rhodes (Worcestershire)
- Most wickets: 5 Graeme Hick (Worcesters)/Neal Radford (Worcesters)

The 1991 Refuge Assurance Cup was the fourth and last competing of the Refuge Assurance Cup, for the most successful teams in the Sunday League. It was an English limited overs county cricket tournament which was held between 1 and 15 September 1991. The tournament was won by Worcestershire who defeated Lancashire by 7 runs in the final at Old Trafford, Manchester.

== Format ==
The cup was an end-of-season affair. The counties finishing in the top four of the 1991 Refuge Assurance League competed in the semi-finals. The top two teams were drawn at home. Winners from the semi-finals then went on to the final at Old Trafford, Manchester, which was held on 15 September 1991.

=== Semi-finals ===
1 September 1991
(scorecard)

Northamptonshire; 185/6 (40 overs)	v	Lancashire; 186/6 (39.1 overs)
Kevin Curran 61*; Mike Watkinson 2/31 (8 overs)		Nick Speak 94*; Andy Roberts 2/41 (6 overs)

Lancashire won by 4 wickets
Old Trafford, Manchester
Umpires: David Constant and Barry Meyer
Player of the match: Nick Speak (Lancashire)

1 September 1991
(scorecard)

Worcestershire; 225/7 (40 overs)	v	Nottinghamshire; 211/8 (40 overs)
Steve Rhodes 47*; Andy Pick 2/35 (8 overs)		Paul Pollard 50; Graeme Hick 5/35 (8 overs)

Worcestershire won by 14 runs
Trent Bridge, Nottingham
Umpires: Roy Palmer & Nigel Plews
Player of the match: Graeme Hick (Worcestershire)

=== Final ===
15 September 1991
(scorecard)

Worcestershire; 235/5 (40 overs)	v	Lancashire; 228 all out (40 overs)
Steve Rhodes 105; Dexter Fitton 2/67 (8 overs)		Graeme Fowler 51; Neal Radford 5/42 (8 overs)

Worcestershire won by 7 runs
Old Trafford, Manchester
Umpires: Dickie Bird & John Hampshire
Player of the match: Steve Rhodes (Worcestershire)

The attendance at the final was 9,025.
