= George Downton =

English cricketer (1928–2014)

George Charles Downton
Personal information
- Born: 1 November 1928; Bexley, Kent
- Died: 19 April 2014 (aged 85); Sevenoaks, Kent
- Role: Wicket-keeper
- Relatives: Paul Downton (son)

Domestic team information
- Years: Team
- 1948: Kent
- Source: CricInfo, 15 January 2023

George Charles Downton (1 November 1928 – 19 April 2014) was an English cricketer who played first-class cricket for Kent County Cricket Club. He played as a wicket-keeper.

Downton was born in Bexley in Kent in 1928. Along with Gordon Raikes, he acted as England wicket-keeper Godfrey Evans' deputy in Kent's 1948 team, playing first-team cricket when Evans was on Test duty. His first-class debut came in June 1948 against Yorkshire at Bradford. He played a total of eight matches for Kent's First XI during the 1948 season, his only season of regular first-class cricket.

He continued to appear for Kent's Second XI in the Minor Counties Championship until 1954 and played club cricket for Sevenoaks Vine, then the dominant club cricket team in Kent. He captained Vine between 1956 and 1962 and was part of a partnership of 265 runs at the Nevill Ground in Tunbridge Wells in 1965. He was capped by the Club Cricket Conference in 1955 and played regularly for the team, including against touring international teams, until 1965. He played two first-class matches for MCC in 1957 and 1959 to bring his total of first-class appearances to 10.

Downton was the father of Paul Downton, also a wicket-keeper, who played for Kent and Middlesex and in 30 Test matches for England in the 1980s. He died in April 2014 at Sevenoaks in Kent aged 85.
