= Steve Rhodes =

Former English cricketer (born 1964)

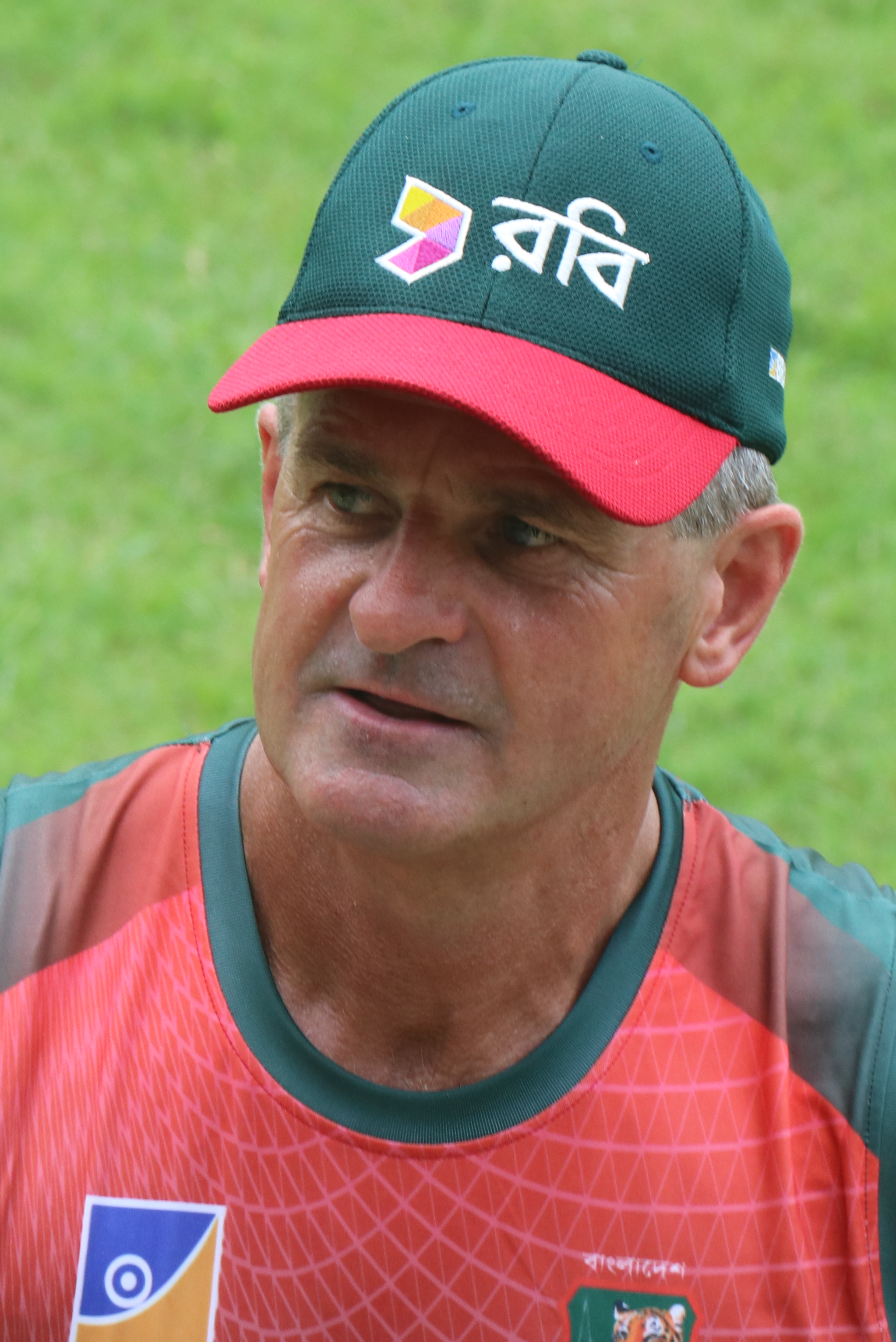
- Rhodes in 2018

Personal information
- Full name: Steven John Rhodes
- Born: 17 June 1964 (age 62); Bradford, Yorkshire, England
- Nickname: Bumpy
- Batting: Right-handed
- Role: Wicket-keeper-batsman
- Relatives: George Rhodes (son); William Rhodes (father)

International information
- National side: England (1989–1995)
- Test debut (cap 566): 2 June 1994 v New Zealand
- Last Test: 3 February 1995 v Australia
- ODI debut (cap 102): 25 May 1989 v Australia
- Last ODI: 10 January 1995 v Australia

Domestic team information
- Years: Team
- 1981–1984: Yorkshire
- 1985–2004: Worcestershire

Head coaching information
- Years: Team
- 2018–2019: Bangladesh

Career statistics
Competition	Test	ODI	FC	LA
Matches	11	9	440	477
Runs scored	294	107	14,839	4,362
Batting average	24.50	17.83	32.82	19.82
100s/50s	0/1	0/1	12/72	1/6
Top score	65*	56	124	105
Catches/stumpings	46/3	9/2	1139/124	532/129
- Source: CricketArchive, 7 June 2016

Steven John Rhodes (born 17 June 1964) is an English cricket coach and former cricketer. He was the former coach of the Bangladesh national cricket team. He was best known as a wicket-keeper, but was also a useful number six or seven batsman, making twelve first-class centuries.

His father, William Rhodes, played more than 30 times for Nottinghamshire County Cricket Club in the early 1960s.

== Domestic career ==
Emerging initially out of Birstall Cricket Club in West Yorkshire, Rhodes' county cricket career began with Yorkshire County Cricket Club in 1981. The incumbent was the international wicket-keeper David Bairstow and after limited chances he moved to Worcestershire County Cricket Club in 1985 staying with that county for the remaining two decades of his playing career.

Rhodes shared in Worcestershire's successes of the late 1980s and early 1990s, as they won the County Championship in 1988 and 1989, the Refuge Assurance League in 1987 and 1988, the Benson & Hedges Cup in 1991 and the NatWest Trophy in 1994. They also won the last Refuge Assurance Cup in 1991, Rhodes making 105, his highest score in limited over cricket and the only century in the four-year history of the tournament, in the final.

Towards the end of the 2004 season, Rhodes briefly became county captain following Ben Smith's resignation during the home game with Northamptonshire County Cricket Club.

Rhodes was a particularly prolific wicketkeeper in limited over cricket, and as of 2022 holds the world records for the most dismissals and most catches in this format.

== International career ==
He was selected for the England tour to India in 1988/89, but when this was cancelled for political reasons he lost his chance, and it was to be 1994 before he made his Test cricket debut.

His selection was primarily down to the new chairman of selectors, Ray Illingworth, who announced at his appointment that he wanted balanced sides i.e. an all-rounder at number 6 with a wicket-keeper at number 7. As such, Illingworth was saying that his chosen wicket-keeper had to contribute with bat and gloves. While Rhodes had a golden summer with the gloves in 1994, he did not make enough runs - especially against the powerful South African bowling attack in the second half of the season (although he did make his only Test half-century in this series at Leeds, and had won plaudits for a "gritty display" in helping to save a Test against New Zealand earlier in the summer).

Chosen to tour Australia in 1994–95, he had a poor tour with gloves and especially with the bat - frequently dismissed by Australian spearhead Craig McDermott, often leg before wicket (LBW). Having waited so long to make his Test debut (he had played three One Day Internationals in 1989), he was dropped in favour of Alec Stewart in 1995, and never played for England again. Nevertheless, Rhodes was named as one of the Wisden Cricketers of the Year in 1994.

== Coaching career ==
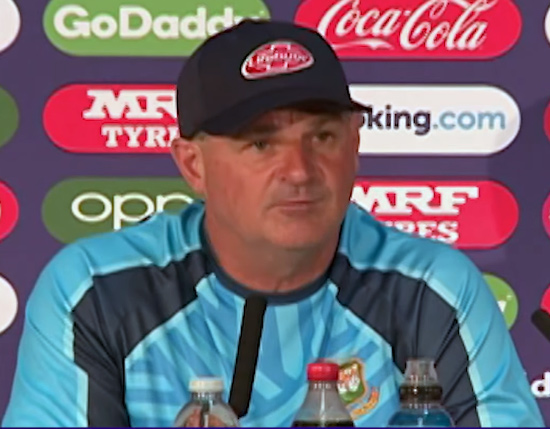
Steve Rhodes in a post match interview in 2019

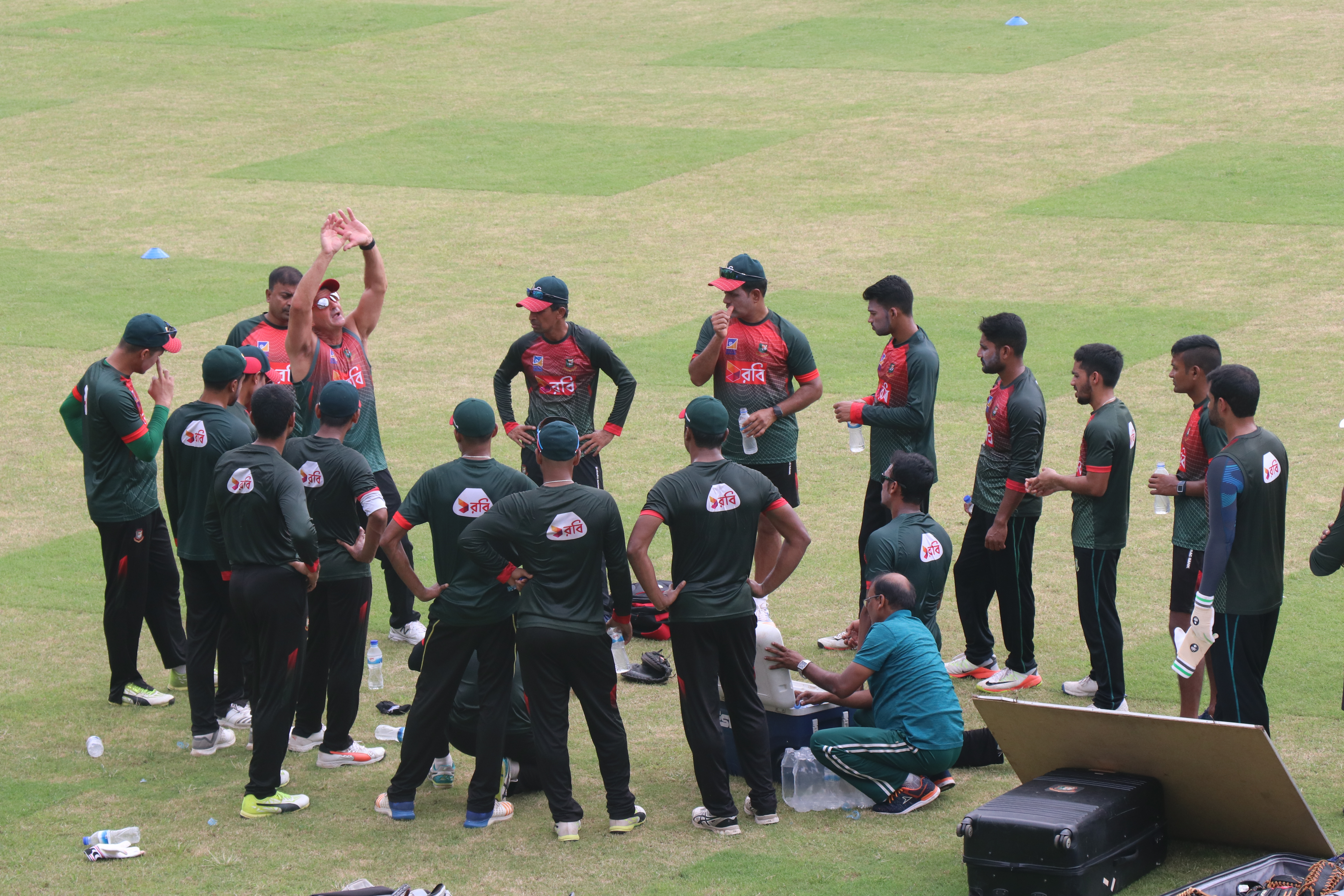
Steve Rhodes coaching Bangladesh team in a practice session at Sher-e-Bangla National Cricket Stadium, Bangladesh

In May 2005, Worcestershire announced that Rhodes had been appointed Coach, following the departure of Tom Moody. He subsequently served as director of cricket between 2006 and 2017.

On 7 June 2018 Bangladesh Cricket Board (BCB) appointed Rhodes head coach for the national team until the end of the 2020 ICC World Twenty20. In July 2018 Rhodes lost his first series as Bangladesh coach when West Indies won the two-match Test series 2–0. In the ODI series, Bangladesh defeated West Indies 2–1 and recorded their second ODI series victory in West Indies. Later, Bangladesh managed to beat West Indies in the T20I series with a 2–1 lead. Rhodes praised his team for making a comeback and won the last two series after they were defeated in the Test series, and he was surprised that they won the T20 series against the world champions West Indies.

Bangladesh also won their first ever tournament final under Rhodes after failing the previous 6 times. In the Tri-nation Series between Bangladesh, Ireland, and West Indies, the Tigers beat the Windies by 5 wickets and won the trophy for the first time ever in their history.

In July 2019, Rhodes' contract with the BCB was terminated, following the team's eighth-place finish in the 2019 Cricket World Cup.

He was a coach with the Comilla Victorians, in the 2022 Bangladesh Premier League

Sporting positions
Preceded by Ben Smith	Worcestershire County Cricket Captain; 2004	Succeeded by Vikram Solanki
Preceded by Tom Moody	Worcestershire County Cricket Coach; 2004-2017	Succeeded by Kevin Sharp
Preceded by New Appointment	Worcestershire Director of Cricket; 2006-2017	Succeeded by Position Redesignated
Preceded by Chandika Hathurusinghe	Head Coach of Bangladesh National Cricket Team; 2018-2019	Succeeded by Russell Domingo
