= 1995 Axa Equity & Law League =

- Administrator(s): Test and County Cricket Board
- Cricket format: Limited overs cricket (40 overs per innings)
- Tournament format(s): League
- Champions: Kent (4th title)
- Participants: 18
- Matches: 153
- Most runs: 815 Steve James (Glamorgan)
- Most wickets: 32 Steve Watkin (Glamorgan)

The 1995 AXA Equity & Law League was the twenty-seventh competing of English cricket's Sunday League. The competition was won for the fourth time by Kent County Cricket Club.

== Standings ==
Team	Pld	W	T	L	N/R	A	Pts	Rp100
Kent (C)	17	12	0	4	0	1	50	92.703
Warwickshire	17	12	0	4	1	0	50	84.407
Worcestershire	17	11	1	3	2	0	50	84.226
Lancashire	17	11	0	5	1	0	46	82.863
Essex	17	10	1	6	0	0	42	90.73
Glamorgan	17	8	0	6	2	1	38	89.179
Leicestershire	17	8	0	7	0	2	36	89.478
Derbyshire	17	7	1	6	3	0	36	80.542
Surrey	17	7	0	8	1	1	32	91.798
Sussex	17	7	0	8	2	0	32	82.853
Nottinghamshire	17	7	0	9	0	1	30	91.011
Yorkshire	17	7	0	9	1	0	30	76.206
Northamptonshire	17	6	1	8	2	0	30	84.942
Somerset	17	5	0	9	1	2	26	82.457
Gloucestershire	17	5	0	10	0	2	24	80.368
Durham	17	4	1	9	1	2	24	73.485
Middlesex	17	4	0	11	1	1	20	76.864
Hampshire	17	3	1	12	0	1	16	82.896
Team marked (C) finished as champions. Source: CricketArchive

== Batting averages ==
Player	M	I	NO	Runs	HS	Avg	100	50	C	S
GA Hick	9	9	3	531	130	88.50	2	4	1	0
SP James	15	15	4	813	93*	73.90	0	8	5	0
PR Pollard	10	10	2	577	132*	72.12	1	4	5	0
DJ Cullinan	10	9	3	350	76*	58.33	0	3	4	0
GR Cowdrey	13	12	3	525	105*	58.33	2	2	6	0
TM Moody	15	15	2	737	108	56.69	2	5	6	0
MG Bevan	15	14	2	648	103*	54.00	2	5	4	0
P Moores	15	14	8	316	89*	52.66	0	1	16	4
P Johnson	14	14	2	606	136*	50.50	2	1	4	0
NH Fairbrother	12	12	4	385	99*	48.12	0	3	3	0
DJ Bicknell	12	12	1	525	102*	47.72	1	4	4	0
GD Lloyd	15	14	5	424	88*	47.11	0	4	2	0
AJ Hollioake	14	13	4	395	93	43.88	0	2	4	0
BF Smith	14	13	2	479	115	43.54	1	1	5	0
CL Cairns	14	13	0	540	101	41.53	1	3	6	0
RJ Harden	13	13	1	487	100*	40.58	1	3	4	0
MA Ealham	13	12	3	364	112	40.44	1	1	1	0
N Hussain	16	16	1	605	83	40.33	0	7	6	0
MR Ramprakash	11	11	2	359	85*	39.88	0	3	3	0
ME Waugh	15	15	0	593	89	39.53	0	5	8	0

== Bowling averages ==
Player	Overs	M	Runs	Wkts	Avg	5W	Best
GA Hick	28.3	1	125	13	9.61	0	4-21
PA Smith	46.4	3	220	17	12.94	0	4-39
ARC Fraser	69.0	10	218	16	13.62	1	5-32
W Akram	112.5	7	415	29	14.31	0	4-16
SR Barwick	92.4	4	431	29	14.86	2	6-49
AE Warner	82.0	8	300	20	15.00	0	4-14
AA Donald	76.4	4	294	19	15.47	1	6-15
SL Watkin	118.0	8	494	30	16.46	0	4-38
SJE Brown	68.5	4	278	16	17.37	0	4-20
SR Lampitt	90.5	3	382	21	18.19	0	4-43
N Killeen	48.4	3	211	11	19.18	1	5-26
MC Ilott	94.4	1	423	22	19.22	0	4-27
J Srinath	43.5	4	213	11	19.36	0	3-27
RP Lefebvre	76.3	3	313	16	19.56	0	3-29
P Mirza	65.0	2	337	17	19.82	0	4-27
RJ Bailey	39.0	0	220	11	20.00	0	3-28
JD Lewry	61.1	5	290	14	20.71	0	4-29
IDK Salisbury	84.0	2	418	20	20.90	0	4-39
GJ Parsons	101.0	10	419	20	20.95	0	3-22
GR Haynes	100.0	8	402	19	21.15	0	4-21

== See also ==
- Sunday League
