= Giles White =

English cricketer

Personal information
- Full name: Giles William White
- Born: 23 March 1972 (age 54); Barnstaple, Devon, England
- Batting: Right-handed
- Bowling: Right-arm leg break
- Role: Hampshire Director of Cricket

Domestic team information
- Years: Team
- 1994–2002: Hampshire
- 1991, 1993: Somerset
- 1992–1993: Devon

Career statistics
Competition	FC	LA
Matches	128	126
Runs scored	6195	2398
Batting average	30.66	21.22
100s/50s	9/30	–/15
Top score	156	76
Balls bowled	871	90
Wickets	12	1
Bowling average	54.41	90.00
5 wickets in innings	–	–
10 wickets in match	–	–
Best bowling	–	1/45
Catches/stumpings	107/2	41/–
- Source: Cricinfo, 6 April 2018

Giles William White (born March 23, 1972), is a former English cricketer and now the Director of Cricket of Hampshire County Cricket Club. He was a right-handed batsman and a right-handed leg-break bowler, as well as being an occasional wicketkeeper. Shane Warne reckoned him to be a strong enough player as to be a candidate to play for England as a leg spinner

He started his first-class career at Somerset, however, he is more noted for his career at Hampshire, where he played for eight years.

Though he started his career as early as 1989 with Devon, where he played in the Minor Counties Championship, even making a Finals appearance in his final year for the county in 1992, and making his first-class debut against the touring Sri Lankans in 1991, which the tourists won despite a double century from Jimmy Cook. His first foray into the County Championship came in 1994, where he played for Hampshire until 2002, even sticking with the team beyond their year-long excursion into the Second Division in 2001.

Having played extensively through the beginning of the 2002 season, White did not play a single game from August onwards, choosing to hang up his gloves, and leaving the team along with Jason Laney, James Schofield and Irfan Shah.

Sporting positions
Preceded by Paul Terry	Hampshire cricket coach 2008–2014	Succeeded by Dale Benkenstein
