= Jason Laney =

English cricketer (born 1973)

Personal information
- Full name: Jason Scott Laney
- Born: 27 April 1973 (age 53); Winchester, Hampshire, England
- Batting: Right-handed
- Bowling: Right-arm off break

Domestic team information
- Years: Team
- 1993–2002: Hampshire (squad no. 15)
- 1995/96: Matabeleland

Career statistics
Competition	First-class	List A
Matches	87	124
Runs scored	4,414	2,903
Batting average	29.82	24.39
100s/50s	5/26	2/11
Top score	112	153
Balls bowled	384	21
Wickets	2	0
Bowling average	112.00	–
5 wickets in innings	0	–
10 wickets in match	0	–
Best bowling	1/24	–
Catches/stumpings	72/–	30/–
- Source: Cricinfo, 2 September 2012

Jason Scott Laney (born 27 April 1973) is an English former cricketer. An opening batsman, he played first-class and one-day cricket for Hampshire between 1993 and 2002. He also played domestic cricket in Zimbabwe for Matabeleland during the 1995–96 Zimbabwean cricket season.

== Cricket career ==
=== Early career ===
Laney was born in Winchester on 27 April 1973. Having played club cricket for Hungerford Cricket Club in the Southern Cricket League, Laney began playing Second Eleven cricket for Hampshire in 1991. Having scored a century in a minor match for the National Association of Young Cricketers against the Star Club of India in 1992, he was signed by Hampshire. He was highly rated by Hampshire captain Mark Nicholas, who considered Laney a future England prospect. His early career with Hampshire was played around his studies at Leeds Metropolitan University, with his senior Hampshire debut coming in a List A one-day match against Essex at Chelmsford in Hampshire's final match of the 1993 Axa Equity & Law League. His next senior appearance would come in the 1995 season, with Laney making his debut in first-class cricket in the 1995 County Championship against Northamptonshire. After making nine first-class and four one-day appearances in 1995, Laney played domestic cricket in Zimbabwe for Matabeleland during the winter, making two appearances in the Logan Cup and a single one-day appearance against Tasmania, who were touring Zimbabwe.

Laney established himself in the Hampshire side as John Stephenson's opening partner during the 1996 season. He would pass a thousand runs in a season for the only time in his career during the season, making 1,163 runs from seventeen matches at an average of 38.76; he scored his maiden first-class century (112 runs) in Hampshire's opening match of the 1996 season against Oxford University. He would make three further century scores during the season, notably making 100 runs against the touring Indians at Southampton in July. In one-day cricket, he made nineteen appearances in which he scored 662 runs at an average of 34.84. He scored his maiden one-day century against minor county Norfolk in the first round of the NatWest Trophy, making 153 runs which earned him the man-of-the-match award; he shared in a record opening stand of 269 runs with Stephenson, which surpassed the competitions previous highest opening stand of 255 runs set by Durham's Mike Roseberry and Stewart Hutton against Herefordshire in the 1995 NatWest Trophy. His form led to him being Hampshire's recipient of the NBC Denis Compton Award for 1996.

=== Decline and release ===
Laney found himself partnering the Australian Matthew Hayden for large periods of the 1997 season. He initially struggled for form, having what The Independent called a "sticky start" to the season. In fifteen first-class matches in 1997, he scored 848 runs at an average of 32.61, but did not score a century. In one-day cricket, he made 499 runs from 21 matches at an average of 23.76. Laney had a strong start to the 1998 season, scoring a century in Hampshire's opening match against Oxford University, contributing toward an opening partnership of 195 runs with Giles White. However, thereafter he suffered a collapse in form and played only eight first-class and thirteen one-day matches throughout the remainder of the season. He averaged just 17.31 in first-class cricket, and scored only 123 further runs following his century against Oxford University, while in one-day matches he scored 142 runs at an average of just 10.92. He was left out of the team at the beginning of the 1999 season, but returned to the Hampshire side after making a double century in a Second Eleven match against Northamptonshire. He performed well following his recall, scoring 691 runs at an average of 38.38 from eleven first-class matches. In fifteen one-day matches, he scored 493 runs at an average of 35.21 runs, and made what would be the final century of his one-day career with an unbeaten 106 against Essex in the National League.

Laney struggled for form during the 2000 season, but was not alone amongst the Hampshire batsmen, with William Kendall, Derek Kenway, and Robin Smith also struggling. Prior to his 81 against Kent in July, his previous eleven innings' in the County Championship had produced a highest score of 19. In his fourteen first-class matches in 2000, he scored 489 runs at an average of 20.37, while in 24 one-day appearances he scored 395 runs at an average of 17.95. After a poor start to the 2001 season, Laney was dropped from the Hampshire starting eleven. He subsequently returned to play club cricket in the Southern Premier League, this time for Havant. Having earned a recall to the side, his form did not sufficiently improve and he was dropped in June from the Hampshire one-day side, in favour of Lawrence Prittipaul. He appeared in just four first-class matches in 2001, but did feature in eighteen one-day matches, scoring 340 runs at an average of 21.25. The following season, he featured in seven matches in the County Championship, scoring 289 runs at an average of 22.23, whilst in one-day cricket he made eight appearances, scoring 197 runs at an average of 24.62. Following Hampshire's relegation from Division One of the County Championship in 2002, Laney was released by Hampshire alongside James Schofield and Irfan Shah. Since his debut in 1993, he had made 84 first-class and 123 one-day appearances for Hampshire. In these, he scored 4,307 runs at an average of 30.11 in first-class cricket, while in one-day cricket he scored 2,901 runs at an average of 24.58.

In the two seasons leading up to his release, Laney had been linked with a move to Gloucestershire, however this never materialised. His release was considered disappointing for a player that had been linked with future England honours, with Hampshire Scorer and statistician Vic Isaacs considering that his early promise had been "unfulfilled". The cricket journalist Kate Laven, writing in The Daily Telegraph, opined that Laney had discovered his comfort zone too early in his career, and that his lack of development after his promising 1996 season had been "one of his county's greatest frustrations". He subsequently returned to playing club cricket in Hampshire for St Cross Symondians, which he did until 2021, and set up a plumbing business based in Winchester.
