= George Rhodes =

George Rhodes may refer to:

- George M. Rhodes (1898–1978), Democratic member of the U.S. House of Representatives from Pennsylvania
- George Rhodes (cricketer) (born 1993), English cricketer
- George Rhodes (farmer) (1816–1864), New Zealand pastoralist
- George Rhodes (musician) (1918–1985), African American arranger, conductor and composer
