= Winston Davis =

West Indian cricketer

Personal information
- Full name: Winston Walter Davis
- Born: 18 September 1958 (age 68); Sion Hill, Kingstown, Saint Vincent and the Grenadines
- Nickname: Davo
- Height: 6 ft 2 in (1.88 m)
- Batting: Right-handed
- Bowling: Right-arm fast
- Role: Bowler

International information
- National side: West Indies
- Test debut: 28 April 1983 v India
- Last Test: 11 January 1988 v India
- ODI debut: 29 March 1983 v India
- Last ODI: 25 January 1988 v India

Domestic team information
- Years: Team
- 1979/80–1991/92: Windward Islands
- 1979/80–1990/81: Combined Islands
- 1982–1984: Glamorgan
- 1985/86: Tasmania
- 1987–1990: Northamptonshire
- 1990/91: Wellington

Career statistics
Competition	Test	ODI	FC	LA
Matches	15	35	181	140
Runs scored	202	28	2,346	429
Batting average	15.53	14.00	14.13	10.46
100s/50s	0/1	0/0	0/5	0/0
Top score	77	10	77	34
Balls bowled	2,773	1,923	33,051	7,095
Wickets	45	39	608	157
Bowling average	32.71	33.38	28.48	30.27
5 wickets in innings	0	1	28	2
10 wickets in match	0	0	7	0
Best bowling	4/19	7/51	7/52	7/51
Catches/stumpings	10/–	1/–	56/–	25/–
Medal record
Men's Cricket
Representing West Indies
ICC Cricket World Cup
Runner-up	1983 England and Wales
- Source: CricketArchive, 18 October 2010

Winston Walter Davis (born 18 September 1958) is a West Indian former cricketer. He was a part of the West Indian squad which finished as runners-up at the 1983 Cricket World Cup.

== Domestic career ==
Davis gradually established himself as a bowler, taking 5–42 against Trinidad and Tobago in the 1981/82 Shell Shield, and he was signed by Glamorgan for the 1982 English season to replace the injured Ezra Moseley. Despite sending down rather too many no-balls at times, Davis finished the season with 42 first-class wickets and was retained for the following season.

Returning to Glamorgan after World Cup, Davis had another successful season, taking 52 wickets at 26.71 from 15 first-class matches, including three five-wicket innings hauls. 1984 was a successful season for Davis: he took 62 first-class wickets at 27.82 apiece and was unlucky not to be retained by Glamorgan for the following season; they decided instead to employ a certain Javed Miandad.

In 1985/86 Davis played Sheffield Shield cricket in Australia for Tasmania with moderate success.

In 1987 he returned to English county cricket with Northamptonshire. For three years he found considerable success, taking a total of 195 wickets at 25.46; his career-best first-class bowling figures of 7-52 came in 1988 in the first innings of the County Championship game against Sussex – noteworthy also for the fact that Davis and David Capel (3-59) bowled unchanged throughout the 32.5 overs of that innings.

Davis endured a final, less than happy, season with Northamptonshire in 1990: he averaged above 60 with the ball in both first-class and one-day cricket, and went for more than five an over in the latter form of the game. His final bowling spell for his county, in the Championship game against Essex, was a disastrous 5-0-37-0 as Graham Gooch and John Stephenson ran riot. With that, Davis bowed out of county cricket for good, and in 1990/91 he went to play for Wellington in New Zealand. It proved a shrewd choice as Davis took 20 first-class wickets at 19.50 in just five matches. After that, there were a couple of exhibition matches against his old county of Glamorgan in 1991, and 54 not out for a World XI against the West Indians at Scarborough, before he returned to the Caribbean for three final domestic games. He did little in any of them, and retired from cricket.

== International career ==
=== Early days ===
Davis played his first representative match for West Indies Young Cricketers against their English counterparts at Port-of-Spain in August 1976, making an immediate impact by taking 4–35 in his first innings, including the wickets of future Test cricketers David Gower, Mike Gatting and Paul Downton. In 1978 he went to England for the return matches, but it was not until 1979/80 that he made his first-class debut, for Windward Islands against Leeward Islands at St John's.

In the meantime in 1982, he had made his Test and One Day International debuts for in the 1982/83 series against India, his first wicket in Test cricket being that of Mohinder Amarnath.

=== Success ===
In 1983 Davis was selected for West Indies' World Cup squad, and when brought into the side for the second group match against Australia at Headingley, immediately hit the headlines by taking 7-51, at the time a world record return in ODIs. He was retained for the other four group matches, but took only one more wicket in total and was not selected for the semi-final or final – perhaps unsurprising when one considers that players of the calibre of Marshall, Garner, Holding and Roberts were all in West Indies' squad for the tournament.

He played in all six Tests in India that winter, taking 14 wickets, but when Australia visited the West Indies in the spring of 1984, Davis was selected for only one Test and one ODI, and despite his experience of English conditions he was at first left out of the party to play England that summer, although when Milton Small was ruled out by a knee injury part-way through the series Davis was drafted into the squad. He played in the fourth Test at Old Trafford, and though he was not particularly effectual with the ball beyond managing to fracture Paul Terry's ulna he did score 77, his highest first-class innings, coming in as nightwatchman on the first day.

In 1984/85 Davis performed well on home soil after being selected for the last two Tests of the four-game series against New Zealand, taking 10 wickets at 18.80 including a career-best 4–19 at Kingston, and took part in no less than 15 ODIs in Australia.

=== Late career ===
In 1986, Davis had fallen away from the Test side as West Indies' fast-bowling production line continued to churn out high-quality pacemen.

During success in 1987 county tournament, he was recalled to international duties for one last time in India in 1987/88, taking 13 wickets at exactly 30 in four Tests but only three in his three ODIs, and captained the Windward Islands team in the same season.

== Beyond cricket ==
In 1998 Davis, a committed Christian, became a tetraplegic after having spinal injuries as a result of a fall from a tree in St Vincent, whilst helping clear land for a new church. He was flown to England for treatment unavailable on the island, and now lives in Worcestershire, England. He has appeared in a film, Because of You, made by Worcestershire County Council's Social Services department; he said of this film, "People with a disability can often be seen as just takers and so for me, starring in this film gave me the opportunity to give something back to the community". Several benefit matches have been held with the object of raising money to help him live a more comfortable life, and have featured a number of high-profile cricketers: in 2005 a Lashings Cricket Club side beat a Winston Davis XI by 87 runs in a match graced by such names as Chris Cairns, V. V. S. Laxman and Alvin Kallicharran.
