= David Rock (cricketer) =

English cricketer

Personal information
- Full name: David John Rock
- Born: 20 April 1957 (age 69); Southsea, Hampshire, England
- Batting: Right-handed
- Bowling: Right-arm medium

Domestic team information
- Years: Team
- 1976–1979: Hampshire

Career statistics
Competition	First-class	List A
Matches	37	18
Runs scored	1,227	286
Batting average	19.17	19.06
100s/50s	3/4	–/2
Top score	114	68
Balls bowled	6	–
Wickets	0	–
Bowling average	–	–
5 wickets in innings	–	–
10 wickets in match	–	–
Best bowling	–	–
Catches/stumpings	19/–	7/–
- Source: Cricinfo, 16 January 2010

David John Rock (born 20 April 1957) is an English former first-class cricketer who played county cricket for Hampshire in the mid-to-late 1970s.

== Cricket career ==
Rock was born at Southsea in April 1957. He was educated at The Portsmouth Grammar School. He began his association with Hampshire in 1974, initially playing in the Second XI Championship. He made his debut in first-class cricket for Hampshire against Surrey at The Oval in the 1976 County Championship, with him making two further Championship appearances that season. He established himself in the Hampshire side in the 1977 County Championship, making eleven appearances; during this season, he scored his maiden first-class century with 114 runs against Leicestershire, sharing in a partnership of 124 for the opening wicket with Gordon Greenidge. Later in the season at Basingstoke, he scored a second century against Nottinghamshire. In that same season, he also made his debut in List A one-day cricket against Somerset at Street in the John Player League, with Rock making nine one-day appearances throughout the season, which included two matches in the Gillette Cup.

Rock was unable to replicate his form during the 1978 season, and was dropped from the County Championship team early in the season. He returned to the Hampshire side against the touring Pakistanis, following injuries and the unavailability of regular players, Alongside seven first-class appearances in 1978, Rock also made four one-day appearances in the John Player League, a tournament which Hampshire won. He appeared more regularly for Hampshire in 1979, making sixteen first-class and five one-day appearances; in first-class cricket that season, he scored 473 runs at an average of 18.19, making one century against Warwickshire at Nuneaton. Following the 1979 season, Rock returned to Hampshire for pre-season preparation ahead of the 1980 season, but retired before the start of that season. In 37 first-class matches, he scored 1,227 runs at an average of 19.17. In eighteen one-day matches, he scored 286 runs at an average of 19.06, with two half centuries and a highest score of 68.
