= Bryan Hamblin =

English cricketer

Personal information
- Full name: Christopher Bryan Hamblin
- Born: 14 April 1952 (age 74); Bletchingley, Surrey, England
- Batting: Right-handed
- Bowling: Right-arm medium
- Relatives: James Hamblin (son)

Domestic team information
- Years: Team
- 1971–1973: Oxford University

Career statistics
Competition	FC	List A
Matches	29	4
Runs scored	693	34
Batting average	19.80	11.33
100s/50s	1/1	0/0
Top score	123*	14
Balls bowled	3206	102
Wickets	38	4
Bowling average	44.63	19.50
5 wickets in innings	0	0
10 wickets in match	0	–
Best bowling	4/32	3/31
Catches/stumpings	13/–	1/–
- Source: Cricinfo, 4 April 2017

Christopher Bryan Hamblin (born 14 April 1952) is a former first-class cricketer who played for Oxford University from 1971 to 1973.

Bryan Hamblin was educated at The King's School, Canterbury, before going up to Keble College, Oxford, where he studied History. A middle-order batsman and medium-pace bowler, he was a regular member of the Oxford cricket team for three years. His highest score came against Leicestershire in 1972, when he scored 37 not out and 123 not out and, opening the bowling, took 2 for 67 and 3 for 33. He was Oxford's leading batsman in 1972 with 526 runs at an average of 29.22.

He toured Bangladesh with MCC in 1978–79 and continued to play club cricket into his fifties, and was secretary of the Harlequins Cricket Club. His son James played cricket for Hampshire in the 2000s.
