= Steve James (cricketer) =

English cricketer, rugby union player & journalist

Personal information
- Full name: Stephen Peter James
- Born: 7 September 1967 (age 59); Lydney, Gloucestershire, England, UK
- Batting: Right-handed
- Bowling: Right-arm medium

International information
- National side: England
- Test debut: 18 June 1998 v South Africa
- Last Test: 27 August 1998 v Sri Lanka

Domestic team information
- Years: Team
- 1985–2003: Glamorgan
- 1989–1990: Cambridge University
- 1993–1995: Mashonaland

Career statistics
Competition	Test	FC	LA
Matches	2	245	238
Runs scored	71	15,890	7,040
Batting average	17.75	40.63	34.50
100s/50s	0/0	47/58	7/49
Top score	36	309*	135
Catches/stumpings	0/–	173/–	60/–
- Source: Cricinfo, 11 July 2020

Stephen Peter James (born 7 September 1967) is an English journalist and former cricketer.

== Cricket career ==
James played for Glamorgan County Cricket Club for 17 seasons, captaining them for final three, before injury forced his retirement in 2004 at the age of 36.

He played a total of 245 first-class matches, making 15,890 runs, including 47 centuries, at a batting average of 40.63. His highest score of 309 not out against Sussex in 2000 set a record highest score for a Glamorgan player. This record stood until 2022 when Sam Northeast scored 410 not out against Leicestershire.

He scored more than 1,000 runs in a season nine times, with his two most prolific seasons coming in consecutive years: 1,766 runs in 1996, followed up with 1,775 runs in 1997. He was subsequently selected for the England A team tour of East Africa and Sri Lanka that winter. He graduated to Test level the following season, playing two Test matches for England, making 71 runs in four innings.

As captain, he guided Glamorgan to first place in Division 2 of the 2001 Norwich Union League, and led them to the Division One crown the following summer.

James also played two seasons of domestic cricket in Zimbabwe for Mashonaland in 1993/94 and 1994/95.

== Rugby career ==
James was also a successful rugby player with Lydney R.F.C. mainly at the full back position. In a career spanning the 1985/86 to 1995/96 seasons he scored 140 points, including 31 tries, in 81 games.

== Writing career ==
Since retirement, he has made a career as a journalist, initially covering cricket and rugby for The Sunday Telegraph and occasionally writing for The Daily Telegraph. He was removed by the paper just before Christmas 2016, and now writes for The Times.

== Personal life ==
James has two children; his daughter died from sepsis in 2020.

== Publications ==
=== Books ===
- James, Steve (2004). Third Man to Fatty's Leg: An Autobiography. First Stone Publishing. ISBN 978-1904439158.
- James, Steve (2012). The Plan: How Fletcher and Flower Transformed English Cricket. London: Bantam Press. ISBN 978-0593068335.
- James, Steve (2015). The Art of Centuries. London: Bantam Press. ISBN 978-0593072929.
- Hoult, Nick & James, Steve (2020). Morgan's Men: The Inside Story of England's Rise from Cricket World Cup Humiliation to Glory. London: Allen & Unwin. ISBN 978-1911630937.
