= 2002 Norwich Union League =

- Administrator: England and Wales Cricket Board
- Cricket format: Limited overs cricket (45 overs per innings)
- Tournament format: League system
- Champions: Glamorgan Dragons (2nd title)
- Participants: 18
- Matches: 144
- Most runs: 654 Ben Smith (Worcestershire)
- Most wickets: 30 Ed Giddins (Surrey); 30 Neil Killeen (Durham)

The 2002 Norwich Union League season was a 45 over English county cricket competition; colloquially known as the Sunday League, it featured many mid-week floodlit matches. It was contested through two divisions: Division One and Division Two. Each team played all the others in their division both home and away. The top three teams from Division Two were promoted to the first division for the 2002 season, while the bottom three teams from Division One were relegated. All eighteen counties retained the nicknames from the previous season.

Glamorgan Dragons won the League for the second time. Somerset Sabres, Durham Dynamos and Nottinghamshire Outlaws were relegated from Division One, while Gloucestershire Gladiators, Surrey Lions and Essex Eagles were promoted from Division Two.

== Teams ==
| Division One | Division Two |
|---|---|
| Durham Dynamos | Derbyshire Scorpions |
| Glamorgan Dragons | Essex Eagles |
| Kent Spitfires | Gloucestershire Gladiators |
| Leicestershire Foxes | Hampshire Hawks |
| Nottinghamshire Outlaws | Lancashire Lightning |
| Somerset Sabres | Middlesex Crusaders |
| Warwickshire Bears | Northamptonshire Steelbacks |
| Worcestershire Royals | Surrey Lions |
| Yorkshire Phoenix | Sussex Sharks |

Icon
Team promoted from Division Two
Team relegated from Division One

== Standings ==
- Pos = Position, Pld = Played, W = Wins, T = Ties, L = Losses, NR = No Results, A = Abandonments, Pts = Points.
- Points awarded: W = 4, L = 0, T = 2, NR = 2, A = 2

=== Division One ===
| Team | Pld | W | T | L | NR | A | Pts | NRR |
|---|---|---|---|---|---|---|---|---|
| Glamorgan Dragons ^{C} | 16 | 12 | 1 | 3 | 0 | 0 | 50 | 8.359 |
| Worcestershire Royals | 16 | 11 | 0 | 3 | 2 | 0 | 48 | 10.689 |
| Warwickshire Bears | 16 | 9 | 0 | 6 | 0 | 1 | 38 | 8.412 |
| Yorkshire Phoenix | 16 | 8 | 0 | 7 | 0 | 1 | 34 | 1.437 |
| Kent Spitfires | 16 | 7 | 1 | 8 | 0 | 0 | 30 | 5.848 |
| Leicestershire Foxes | 16 | 7 | 0 | 8 | 1 | 0 | 30 | 3.521 |
| Somerset Sabres ^{R} | 16 | 5 | 0 | 10 | 0 | 1 | 22 | -3.526 |
| Durham Dynamos ^{R} | 16 | 5 | 0 | 11 | 0 | 0 | 20 | -21.174 |
| Nottinghamshire Outlaws ^{R} | 16 | 3 | 0 | 11 | 1 | 1 | 16 | -11.285 |
Source:.

=== Division Two ===
| Team | Pld | W | T | L | NR | A | Pts | NRR |
|---|---|---|---|---|---|---|---|---|
| Gloucestershire Gladiators ^{C} | 16 | 10 | 0 | 4 | 1 | 1 | 44 | 12.746 |
| Surrey Lions ^{P} | 16 | 10 | 0 | 5 | 1 | 0 | 42 | 6.529 |
| Essex Eagles ^{P} | 16 | 10 | 0 | 6 | 0 | 0 | 40 | 3.938 |
| Derbyshire Scorpions | 16 | 8 | 0 | 7 | 0 | 1 | 34 | -0.982 |
| Lancashire Lightning | 16 | 7 | 0 | 7 | 1 | 1 | 32 | -6.989 |
| Northamptonshire Steelbacks | 16 | 7 | 0 | 8 | 0 | 1 | 30 | 7.788 |
| Hampshire Hawks | 16 | 6 | 0 | 9 | 0 | 1 | 26 | -2.965 |
| Sussex Sharks | 16 | 4 | 0 | 10 | 2 | 0 | 20 | -7.424 |
| Middlesex Crusaders | 16 | 4 | 0 | 10 | 1 | 1 | 20 | -12.512 |
Source:.

== Statistics ==
=== Division One ===
==== Most runs ====
| Player | Team | Matches | Innings | Runs | Average | HS | 100s | 50s |
|---|---|---|---|---|---|---|---|---|
| Ben Smith | Worcestershire | 16 | 15 | 654 | 65.40 | 92* | 0 | 7 |
| Darren Stevens | Leicestershire | 16 | 15 | 651 | 43.40 | 125 | 1 | 5 |
| Vikram Solanki | Worcestershire | 16 | 15 | 555 | 39.64 | 119* | 1 | 4 |
| Kevin Pietersen | Nottinghamshire | 11 | 10 | 515 | 64.37 | 147 | 2 | 1 |
| Iain Sutcliffe | Leicestershire | 16 | 16 | 512 | 39.38 | 104* | 1 | 4 |

==== Most wickets ====
| Player | Team | Matches | Overs | Wickets | Average | BBI | 4W |
|---|---|---|---|---|---|---|---|
| Neil Killeen | Durham | 16 | 131.4 | 30 | 18.73 | 4/12 | 2 |
| Robert Croft | Glamorgan | 16 | 117.2 | 28 | 19.64 | 4/40 | 1 |
| Steffan Jones | Somerset | 12 | 87.4 | 22 | 24.18 | 4/72 | 1 |
| Shaun Pollock | Warwickshire | 10 | 79.2 | 21 | 13.00 | 4/36 | 1 |
| Andrew Davies | Glamorgan | 15 | 110.2 | 21 | 24.66 | 4/33 | 1 |
| Kabir Ali | Worcestershire | 16 | 109 | 21 | 26.52 | 5/36 | 2 |

=== Division Two ===
==== Most runs ====
| Player | Team | Matches | Innings | Runs | Average | HS | 100s | 50s |
|---|---|---|---|---|---|---|---|---|
| Stuart Law | Lancashire | 12 | 12 | 561 | 51.00 | 133 | 1 | 4 |
| Craig Spearman | Gloucestershire | 15 | 14 | 542 | 38.71 | 107 | 1 | 4 |
| Mark Ramprakash | Surrey | 15 | 15 | 537 | 44.75 | 87* | 0 | 5 |
| Andy Flower | Essex | 14 | 14 | 506 | 50.60 | 80 | 0 | 6 |
| David Sales | Northamptonshire | 15 | 14 | 459 | 32.78 | 93 | 0 | 5 |

==== Most wickets ====
| Player | Team | Matches | Overs | Wickets | Average | BBI | 4W |
|---|---|---|---|---|---|---|---|
| Ed Giddins | Surrey | 14 | 107 | 30 | 14.50 | 5/20 | 2 |
| Mike Smith | Gloucestershire | 13 | 100.1 | 24 | 14.70 | 5/30 | 1 |
| Dimitri Mascarenhas | Hampshire | 15 | 126.2 | 24 | 21.08 | 5/27 | 3 |
| Adam Hollioake | Surrey | 12 | 64.2 | 23 | 13.86 | 5/43 | 3 |
| Graeme Welch | Derbyshire | 14 | 117.3 | 23 | 22.47 | 6/31 | 2 |
