= William Rhodes (Nottinghamshire cricketer) =

English cricketer (1936–2005)

Billy Rhodes
Personal information
- Full name: William Ernest Rhodes
- Born: 5 August 1936; Bradford, Yorkshire, England
- Died: 16 August 2005 (aged 69); Macclesfield, Cheshire, England
- Nickname: Billy
- Batting: Right-handed
- Role: Batsman/wicketkeeper
- Relatives: SJ Rhodes (son); GH Rhodes (grandson)

Domestic team information
- Years: Team
- 1961–64: Nottinghamshire
- First-class debut: 17 May 1961 Nottinghamshire v Yorkshire
- Last First-class: 28 July 1964 Nottinghamshire v Yorkshire

Career statistics
Competition	First-class
Matches	36
Runs scored	1207
Batting average	20.11
100s/50s	1/1
Top score	132
Balls bowled	6
Wickets	0
Bowling average	–
5 wickets in innings	–
10 wickets in match	–
Best bowling	–
Catches/stumpings	40/1
- Source: CricketArchive, 15 August 2013

William Ernest Rhodes (5 August 1936 – 16 August 2005), generally known as "Billy Rhodes", was an English cricketer. He was a middle-order right-handed batsman and an occasional wicketkeeper who played first-class cricket for Nottinghamshire between 1961 and 1964. He was born in Bradford, Yorkshire and died in Macclesfield, Cheshire. He was the father of the England Test wicketkeeper Steve Rhodes and grandfather of George Rhodes.

As a 17-year-old, Rhodes played for Yorkshire's junior team in 1954. And in 1959 he played for both Worcestershire's second eleven and a non-first-class Nottinghamshire side. From 1960 he played for Nottinghamshire's second team, but as a wicketkeeper his passage into the first team was barred by Geoff Millman who became a Test player soon after.

In 1961, he played in seven first-class matches for Nottinghamshire purely as a batsman, being tried as an opener alongside the established Norman Hill in five of them; the experiment was not a success, and Rhodes' highest score in 13 innings was just 38, and his 169 runs for the season came at an average of only 15.36. In 1962, Millman was England's incumbent Test wicketkeeper at the start of the season, and Rhodes played in several games as wicketkeeper as well as in some as a batsman only. This was his best season with the bat: he made 726 runs at an average of 23.41. But his aggregate and average were much bolstered by an innings of 132 in the game against Cambridge University. He made only one other score of more than 50: he scored 57 as an opener in the game against Derbyshire. Once Millman had lost his Test place, he played less and did not appear after the end of July.

In 1963, Millman was both wicketkeeper and captain, and Rhodes played only one first-team match. There were a few more games in 1964, but he was not successful, failing to pass 50 in any innings, and at the end of the season his contract was not renewed.
