= 2001 County Championship =

Cricket season

- Dates: 20 April – 15 September 2001
- Administrator: England and Wales Cricket Board
- Cricket format: First-class cricket (4 days)
- Tournament format: League system
- Champions: Yorkshire (30th title)
- Participants: 18
- Matches: 144
- Most runs: Michael Hussey (2,055 for Northamptonshire)
- Most wickets: James Kirtley (75 for Sussex)

The 2001 County Championship season, known as the CricInfo Championship for sponsorship reasons, was contested through two divisions: Division One and Division Two. Each team plays all the others in their division both home and away. The top three teams from Division Two were promoted to the first division for 2002, while the bottom three teams from Division 1 are relegated.

== Teams ==
=== Division One ===
Team promoted from Division Two

Team	Primary home ground	Other grounds	Captain
Essex	County Ground, Chelmsford	Valentines Park, Ilford; Southchurch Park, Southend-on-Sea; Castle Park Cricket Ground, Colchester	(England) Nasser Hussain (Note: Hussain was club captain; ECB-contracted, he played only one match for Essex and was not captain for that. Ronnie Irani served as the team captain.)
Glamorgan	Sophia Gardens, Cardiff	St Helen's, Swansea; Colwyn Bay Cricket Club Ground, Rhos on Sea	(England) Steve James
Kent	St Lawrence Ground, Canterbury	Nevill Ground, Tunbridge Wells; Mote Park, Maidstone	(England) Matthew Fleming
Lancashire	Old Trafford, Manchester	—	(England) John Crawley
Leicestershire	Grace Road, Leicester	—	(England) Vince Wells
Northamptonshire	County Ground, Northampton	—	(England) David Ripley
Somerset	County Ground, Taunton	Recreation Ground, Bath	(Australia) Jamie Cox
Surrey	The Oval, London	Woodbridge Road, Guildford	(England) Adam Hollioake
Yorkshire	Headingley, Leeds	North Marine Road Ground, Scarborough	(England) David Byas

=== Division Two ===
Team relegated from Division One

Team	Primary home ground	Other grounds	Captain
Derbyshire	County Ground, Derby	—	(England) Dominic Cork
Durham	Riverside Ground, Chester-le-Street	—	(England) Jonathan Lewis
Gloucestershire	County Ground, Bristol	Archdeacon Meadow, Gloucester; College Ground, Cheltenham	(England) Mark Alleyne
Hampshire	Rose Bowl, Southampton	—	(England) Robin Smith
Middlesex	Lord's, London	John Walker's Ground, Southgate	(England) Angus Fraser
Nottinghamshire	Trent Bridge, Nottingham	—	(England) Jason Gallian
Sussex	County Ground, Hove	Cricket Field Road Ground, Horsham; Arundel Castle Cricket Ground, Arundel	(England) Chris Adams
Warwickshire	Edgbaston, Birmingham	—	(England) Mike Powell
Worcestershire	County Ground, New Road, Worcester	Chester Road North Ground, Kidderminster	(England) Graeme Hick

== Standings ==
Teams received 12 points for a win, 6 for a tie and 4 for a draw. Bonus points (a maximum of 5 batting points and 3 bowling points) could be scored during the first 130 overs of each team's first innings.

=== Division One ===
	Team	P	W	L	D	A	Bat	Bowl	Ded	Pts
1	Yorkshire (C)	16	9	3	4	0	50	45	0	219
2	Somerset	16	6	2	8	0	55	44	0	203
3	Kent	16	4	3	9	0	48	44	1	175
4	Surrey	16	3	1	11	1	43	43	0.5	169.5
5	Leicestershire	16	5	6	5	0	38	47	0	165
6	Lancashire	16	4	5	5	2	38	39	0	153
7	Northamptonshire (R)	16	2	5	9	0	52	36	0	148
8	Glamorgan (R)	16	2	5	8	1	36	37	0	133
9	Essex (R)	16	2	7	7	0	28	36	0	116
	Source:.									

=== Division Two ===
	Team	P	W	L	D	Bat	Bowl	Ded	Pts
1	Sussex (C)	16	9	3	4	42	42	0	208
2	Hampshire (P)	16	7	2	7	34	44	0	192 (Note: Includes 8 points for batting last in drawn match with scores level)
3	Warwickshire (P)	16	5	1	10	46	40	0.25	185.75
4	Gloucestershire	16	5	5	6	46	43	0	173
5	Middlesex	16	4	3	9	46	42	0	172
6	Worcestershire	16	4	5	7	35	41	0.25	151.75
7	Nottinghamshire	16	3	7	6	44	38	0.75	141.25
8	Durham	16	3	6	7	32	44	0	140
9	Derbyshire	16	1	9	6	20	37	0.75	92.25
	Source:								

== Results ==
=== Division One ===
	Essex	Glamorgan	Kent	Lancashire	Leicestershire	Northamptonshire	Somerset	Surrey	Yorkshire
Essex		6-9 Jun; Glamorgan; 6 wickets	18-20 Jul; Kent inns & 132 runs	22-25 Aug; Match drawn	1-4 Aug; Match drawn	25-28 Apr; Match drawn	5-7 Sep; Somerset; 9 wickets	13-16 Jun; Match drawn	16–19 May; Match drawn
Glamorgan	15-18 Aug; Match drawn		25–28 May; Match drawn	1-4 Aug; Match drawn	18-21 Jul; Leicestershire inns & 90 runs	29 Jun-2 Jul; Match drawn	25-28 Apr; Match drawn	12-15 Sep; Match drawn	30 May-1 Jun; Yorkshire; 328 runs
Kent	30 May-1 Jun; Kent inns & 152 runs	13-16 Jun; Match drawn		4-6 Jul; Kent; 268 runs	20-22 Jun; Leicestershire inns & 149 runs	5-8 Sep; Match drawn	1-4 Aug; Match drawn	16-19 Aug; Match drawn	25-28 Apr; Yorkshire; 4 wickets
Lancashire	19-22 Jun; Lancashire; 9 wickets	16–19 May; Match abandoned	12-15 Sep; Match drawn		6-9 Jun; Lancashire; 6 wickets	15-18 Aug; Match drawn	19-21 Jul; Somerset; 10 wickets	25-28 Apr; Match abandoned	7-10 Aug; Yorkshire inns & 37 runs
Leicestershire	20-22 Apr; Essex inns & 9 runs	7-9 Sep; Leicestershire; 10 wickets	27-30 Jul; Kent; 3 wickets	9–11 May; Leicestershire; 6 runs		13-15 Jun; Leicestershire; 9 wickets	30 May-2 Jun; Match drawn	4-7 Jul; Match drawn	15-18 Aug; Yorkshire; 168 runs
Northamptonshire	27-30 Jul; Northamptonshire; 10 wickets	20-23 Apr; Match drawn	8-11 Aug; Match drawn	30 May-2 Jun; Lancashire; 3 wickets	23-26 Aug; Northamptonshire; 202 runs		20-23 Jun; Match drawn	9–12 May; Match drawn	4-7 Jul; Match drawn
Somerset	4-7 Jul; Somerset inns & 60 runs	27-29 Jul; Somerset inns & 67 runs	16–19 May; Match drawn	20-23 Apr; Lancashire inns & 4 runs	7-10 Aug; Match drawn	12-15 Sep; Somerset; 4 wickets		23-26 Aug; Match drawn	13-16 Jun; Match drawn
Surrey	25–28 May; Match drawn	8-11 Aug; Glamorgan; 3 wickets	20-23 Apr; Match drawn	29 Jun-2 Jul; Match drawn	16–19 May; Match drawn	18-20 Jul; Surrey inns & 55 runs	6-9 Jun; Surrey; 6 wickets		5-8 Sep; Surrey inns & 46 runs
Yorkshire	12-15 Sep; Essex; 51 runs	21-24 Aug; Yorkshire inns & 112 runs	6-9 Jun; Yorkshire; 9 wickets	27-30 Jul; Yorkshire; 7 wickets	29 Jun-1 Jul; Yorkshire inns & 227 runs	25–27 May; Yorkshire; 4 wickets	9–12 May; Somerset; 161 runs	1-4 Aug; Match drawn	

Home team won	Visiting team won	Match drawn

=== Division Two ===
	Derbyshire	Durham	Gloucestershire	Hampshire	Middlesex	Nottinghamshire	Sussex	Warwickshire	Worcestershire
Derbyshire		6-9 Jun; Match drawn	20-23 Jun; Match drawn	25–28 May; Hampshire; 9 wickets	25-28 Apr; Match drawn	27-30 Jul; Match drawn	15-18 Aug; Sussex; 130 runs	12-15 Sep; Warwickshire inns & 100 runs	5-8 Jul; Worcestershire inns & 3 runs
Durham	8-10 Aug; Derbyshire; 4 wickets		20-23 Apr; Match drawn	17-20 Aug; Hampshire; 7 wickets	16–19 May; Match drawn	30 May-2 Jun; Durham; 8 wickets	18-21 Jul; Sussex; 133 runs	29 Jun-2 Jul; Match drawn	5-8 Sep; Match drawn
Gloucestershire	5-7 Sep; Gloucestershire inns & 20 runs	13-16 Jun; Match drawn		1-4 Aug; Match drawn	9–12 May; Middlesex; 5 wickets	15-18 Aug; Gloucestershire inns & 120 runs	27-30 Jul; Gloucestershire; 10 wickets	4-7 Jul; Match drawn	25–28 May; Worcestershire; 252 runs
Hampshire	29 Jun-1 Jul; Hampshire; 10 wickets	20-22 Jun; Hampshire; 47 runs	16–19 May; Match drawn		5-7 Sep; Hampshire; 5 wickets	18-21 Jul; Hampshire; 338 runs	30 May-2 Jun; Match drawn	7-10 Aug; Match drawn	9–11 May; Hampshire; 124 runs
Middlesex	30 May-1 Jun; Middlesex inns & 185 runs	27-29 Jul; Middlesex inns & 74 runs	8-11 Aug; Gloucestershire inns & 59 runs	13-16 Jun; Match drawn		25–28 May; Match drawn	29 Jun-2 Jul; Match drawn	22-25 Aug; Match drawn	20-23 Apr; Match drawn
Nottinghamshire	22-25 Aug; Nottinghamshire; 7 wickets	25-28 Apr; Match drawn	6-9 Jun; Gloucestershire; 187 runs	12-15 Sep; Match drawn	4-7 Jul; Match drawn		20-23 Jun; Sussex; 161 runs	16–19 May; Match drawn	8-11 Aug; Nottinghamshire; 61 runs
Sussex	13-15 Jun; Sussex inns & 34 runs	22-25 Aug; Durham; 71 runs	12-14 Sep; Sussex; 10 wickets	6-7 Jul; Sussex inns & 113 runs	2-5 Aug; Sussex; 192 runs	9–12 May; Sussex; 162 runs		25–28 May; Warwickshire; 8 wickets	6-9 Jun; Sussex; 33 runs
Warwickshire	18-21 Jul; Match drawn	9–12 May; Warwickshire; 7 wickets	31 May-3 Jun; Warwickshire; 10 wickets	20-23 Apr; Match drawn	20-23 Jun; Middlesex; 129 runs	3-6 Aug; Warwickshire; 139 runs	7-10 Sep; Match drawn		15-18 Aug; Match drawn
Worcestershire	16–19 May; Match drawn	2-5 Aug; Durham; 7 wickets	20-22 Jul; Worcestershire; 7 wickets	22-25 Aug; Worcestershire; 112 runs	12-15 Sep; Match drawn	29 Jun-2 Jul; Nottinghamshire; 7 wickets	25-28 Apr; Match drawn	13-16 Jun; Match drawn	

Home team won	Visiting team won	Match drawn

== Statistics ==
=== Division One ===
==== Most runs ====
Player	Team	Matches	Innings	Runs	Average	HS	100s	50s
Michael Hussey	Northamptonshire	16	30	2055	79.03	329*	5	9
David Fulton	Kent	16	24	1729	78.59	208*	8	3
Darren Lehmann	Yorkshire	13	19	1416	83.29	252	5	5
Stuart Law	Essex	13	23	1311	65.55	153	4	8
Russell Warren	Northamptonshire	16	27	1303	54.29	194	4	7

==== Most wickets ====
Player	Team	Matches	Overs	Wickets	Average	BBI	5W
Martin Bicknell	Surrey	15	541.5	72	21.36	7/60	3
Devon Malcolm	Leicestershire	16	545.1	68	28.58	8/63	4
Martin Saggers	Kent	16	492.3	63	24.12	6/92	3
Richard Johnson	Somerset	13	463.2	62	23.77	5/40	5
Steffan Jones	Somerset	16	560	59	34.15	5/115	1

=== Division Two ===
==== Most runs ====
Player	Team	Matches	Innings	Runs	Average	HS	100s	50s
Murray Goodwin	Sussex	16	30	1521	58.50	203*	6	5
Richard Montgomerie	Sussex	16	30	1461	47.51	160*	7	4
Graeme Hick	Worcestershire	16	26	1390	60.43	201	6	3
Martin Love	Durham	15	29	1364	50.51	145*	1	13
Greg Blewett	Nottinghamshire	16	30	1292	47.85	137*	5	5

==== Most wickets ====
Player	Team	Matches	Overs	Wickets	Average	BBI	5W
James Kirtley	Sussex	16	566.3	75	23.32	6/34	5
Andy Bichel	Worcestershire	16	555.5	66	27.33	6/44	4
Alamgir Sheriyar	Worcestershire	14	472.3	65	23.60	6/88	3
Alan Mullally	Hampshire	12	427.3	57	18.36	8/90	5
Jason Lewry	Sussex	15	489.1	57	25.70	7/42	3
Phil Tufnell	Middlesex	15	626.3	57	26.49	6/44	3

== See also ==
- 2001 Cheltenham & Gloucester Trophy
- 2001 Benson & Hedges Cup
- 2001 Norwich Union League
