= 1998 Axa League =

- Administrator: England and Wales Cricket Board
- Cricket format: Limited overs cricket (40 overs per innings)
- Tournament format: League
- Champions: Lancashire (4th title)
- Participants: 18
- Matches: 153
- Most runs: 650 Mal Loye (Northamptonshire)
- Most wickets: 25 James Kirtley (Sussex)

The 1998 AXA League was the thirtieth competing of English cricket's Sunday League. The competition was won for the fourth time by Lancashire County Cricket Club.

This was the last season in which all the first-class counties competed in a single league. For the 1999 season, the counties would be divided into a First and Second Division of nine teams each. The top nine teams at the end of this season were placed in the First Division, and the bottom nine in the Second Division.

== Standings ==
Team	Pld	W	T	L	NR	A	Pts	NRR
Lancashire (C)	17	12	0	2	1	2	54	12.184
Warwickshire	17	9	0	5	1	2	42	4.237
Essex	17	9	1	5	1	1	42	1.275
Leicestershire	17	9	0	6	1	1	40	15.138
Kent	17	8	0	6	3	0	38	3.323
Gloucestershire	17	7	0	6	2	2	36	-1.659
Worcestershire	17	7	1	6	2	1	36	-4.604
Hampshire	17	8	0	8	1	0	34	0.838
Yorkshire	17	8	0	8	1	0	34	-2.477
Glamorgan	17	7	0	8	0	2	32	-0.098
Nottinghamshire	17	7	1	8	0	1	32	-0.675
Middlesex	17	7	0	8	0	2	32	-4.907
Northamptonshire	17	6	1	7	1	2	32	2.805
Somerset	17	6	1	8	1	1	30	-0.102
Derbyshire	17	6	0	8	0	3	30	-5.101
Sussex	17	6	0	9	1	1	28	-3.591
Durham	17	4	1	9	1	2	24	-7.9
Surrey	17	3	0	12	1	1	16	-8.176
Team marked (C) finished as champions. Source: CricketArchive

Key	
	Qualified for National League First Division for the 1999 season
	Qualified for National League Second Division for the 1999 season

== Batting averages ==
Player	M	I	NO	Runs	HS	Avg	100	50	C	S	Team
RC Irani	16	15	7	528	95*	66.00	-	4	5	-	ESSEX
NH Fairbrother	10	9	3	387	82*	64.50	-	4	3	-	LANCS
CL Hooper	16	14	3	577	100	52.45	1	4	8	-	KENT
AP Cowan	10	5	4	51	40*	51.00	-	-	9	-	ESSEX
P Johnson	16	16	3	621	88*	47.76	-	5	4	-	NOTTS
MB Loye	15	15	1	650	108*	46.42	1	4	3	-	NORTHANTS
RI Dawson	14	14	2	555	75	46.25	-	4	7	-	GLOUCS
AP Wells	9	8	2	277	118	46.16	1	-	3	-	KENT
MG Bevan	10	10	3	323	78	46.14	-	3	3	-	SUSSEX
MA Ealham	11	9	5	180	55	45.00	-	2	5	-	KENT
ME Cassar	11	11	3	347	134	43.37	1	2	3	-	DERBY
MJ Slater	10	10	0	429	110	42.90	1	3	3	-	DERBY
DS Lehmann	11	11	0	455	99	41.36	-	4	3	-	YORKS
KJ Barnett	14	14	4	405	52*	40.50	-	3	3	-	DERBY
JA Daley	6	5	2	120	69	40.00	-	1	2	-	DURHAM
PJ Prichard	9	8	1	276	99*	39.42	-	2	1	-	ESSEX
ME Harvey	1	1	0	39	39	39.00	-	-	-	-	LANCS
JL Langer	12	12	1	427	87*	38.81	-	3	6	-	MIDDX
MA Atherton	7	7	0	269	98	38.42	-	2	1	-	LANCS
RA Smith	15	15	1	537	103	38.35	1	3	4	-	HANTS
SG Law	15	14	1	487	126	37.46	1	2	12	-	ESSEX

== Bowling averages ==
Name	Mat	O	M	R	W	Ave	Best	4w	5w	SR	Econ	Team
GR Napier	6	12	1	49	6	8.16	Mar-22	-	-	12	4.08	ESSEX
JM Dakin	15	32	6	112	13	8.61	Apr-14	1	-	14.7	3.5	LEICS
J Ormond	6	47	7	139	16	8.68	04-Dec	2	-	17.6	2.95	LEICS
MR Ramprakash	7	4	0	10	1	10	01-Oct	-	-	24	2.5	MIDDX
SJ Renshaw	1	8	0	44	4	11	Apr-44	1	-	12	5.5	HANTS
ME Cassar	11	2	0	11	1	11	01-Nov	-	-	12	5.5	DERBY
D Gough	7	46	3	189	17	11.11	May-25	1	1	16.2	4.1	YORKS
MA Sheikh	5	37	3	144	12	12	Mar-28	-	-	18.5	3.89	WARWICKS
JBdeC Thompson	2	11	3	27	2	13.5	Feb-16	-	-	33	2.45	KENT
ND Martin	1	6	0	28	2	14	Feb-28	-	-	18	4.66	MIDDX
CA Walsh	13	80.4	6	335	23	14.56	May-23	-	1	21	4.15	GLOUCS
ID Austin	14	83.4	8	277	19	14.57	03-Aug	-	-	26.4	3.31	LANCS
GC Small	11	53.4	1	207	14	14.78	May-18	-	1	23	3.85	WARWICKS
AF Giles	14	70.4	6	269	18	14.94	Apr-17	1	-	23.5	3.8	WARWICKS
CJ Adams	13	24.2	0	122	8	15.25	May-16	-	1	18.2	5.01	SUSSEX
RJ Chapman	10	49.3	2	234	15	15.6	May-30	-	1	19.8	4.72	WORCS
CJ Batt	2	9	1	47	3	15.66	Mar-26	-	-	18	5.22	MIDDX
MN Bowen	3	20	2	95	6	15.83	Apr-35	1	-	20	4.75	NOTTS
D Williamson	16	92.5	4	367	23	15.95	03-Dec	-	-	24.2	3.95	LEICS
GA Hick	14	11	0	64	4	16	Apr-46	1	-	16.5	5.81	WORCS
PJ Franks	12	83.4	5	357	22	16.22	Apr-21	1	-	22.8	4.26	NOTTS
MJ Hoggard	2	9	0	33	2	16.5	02-Dec	-	-	27	3.66	YORKS
PJ Martin	14	84.4	8	334	20	16.7	Apr-22	1	-	25.4	3.94	LANCS
ID Fisher	6	29	0	118	7	16.85	Mar-25	-	-	24.8	4.06	YORKS
A Sheriyar	7	35.2	1	173	10	17.3	Mar-32	-	-	21.2	4.89	WORCS

== See also ==
Sunday League
