= 1999 English cricket season =

The 1999 cricket season was the 100th in which the County Championship has been an official competition. The title was won by Surrey. Sponsorship by Britannic Assurance came to an end with PPP (Private Patients Plan) Healthcare taking over and the decision was made to split the championship into two divisions the following season. The top nine teams would form the first division with the bottom nine teams going into the second division. The Sunday League changed to a new format National League with games played midweek under floodlight. On the international scene, England hosted the 1999 Cricket World Cup and New Zealand defeated England 2–1 in the Test series.

== Honours ==
- County Championship - Surrey
- NatWest Trophy - Gloucestershire
- CGU National League - Lancashire
- Benson & Hedges Super Cup - Gloucestershire
- Minor Counties Championship - Cumberland
- MCCA Knockout Trophy - Bedfordshire
- Second XI Championship - Middlesex II
- Wisden - Chris Cairns, Rahul Dravid, Lance Klusener, Tom Moody, Saqlain Mushtaq

== External sources ==
- CricketArchive – season and tournament itineraries

== Annual reviews ==
- Playfair Cricket Annual 2000
- Wisden Cricketers' Almanack 2000
