= 1991 Refuge Assurance League =

Cricket competition

- Administrator(s): Test and County Cricket Board
- Cricket format: Limited overs cricket (40 overs per innings)
- Tournament format(s): League
- Champions: Nottinghamshire (1st title)
- Participants: 17
- Matches: 136
- Most runs: 917 Tom Moody (Worcestershire)
- Most wickets: 30 Franklyn Stephenson (Sussex)

The 1991 Refuge Assurance League was the twenty-third competing of what was generally known as the Sunday League. The competition was won for the first time by Nottinghamshire County Cricket Club.

== The season ==
Somerset played Lancashire at Taunton on Friday 5 July 1991 to be the first Sunday League game not to be played on a Sunday.

Nottinghamshire beat Derbyshire, the previous season's champions, in the final round of matches at Trent Bridge to claim the title. Tom Moody of Worcestershire had an excellent season scoring a record 917 runs (including 5 centuries).

== Standings ==
Team	Pld	W	T	L	N/R	A	Pts	Rp100
Nottinghamshire (C)	16	13	0	3	0	0	52	83.471
Lancashire	16	12	0	3	1	0	50	89.781
Northamptonshire	16	10	0	4	1	1	44	86.264
Worcestershire	16	9	1	4	2	0	42	95.162
Warwickshire	16	8	1	4	1	2	40	82.534
Essex	16	7	1	4	2	2	38	84.419
Yorkshire	16	9	0	7	0	0	36	86.388
Somerset	16	7	0	7	1	1	32	80.858
Surrey	16	7	0	7	1	1	32	81.945
Kent	16	6	1	8	0	1	28	87.460
Middlesex	16	6	0	9	0	1	26	79.150
Gloucestershire	16	5	0	9	1	1	24	76.146
Sussex	16	5	0	9	1	1	24	81.421
Leicestershire	16	5	0	10	0	1	22	78.291
Derbyshire	16	5	0	11	0	0	20	84.389
Glamorgan	16	4	0	10	2	0	20	82.610
Hampshire	16	3	0	12	1	0	14	79.242
Team marked (C) finished as champions. Source: CricketArchive

== Refuge Assurance Cup ==
Following the end of the Sunday League season, the top four teams in the Sunday League competed for the Refuge Assurance Cup. Worcestershire emerged as victors, defeating Lancashire in the final.

== See also ==
Sunday League
