= Gordon Raikes =

English cricketer (1910–1993)

Douglas Raikes
Personal information
- Full name: Douglas Charles Gordon Raikes
- Born: 26 January 1910; Bristol, England
- Died: 27 March 1993 (aged 83); Guisachan, Tomich, Strathglass, Scotland
- Batting: Right-handed
- Role: Wicket-keeper

Domestic team information
- Years: Team
- 1931: Oxford University
- 1932: Gloucestershire
- 1948: Kent

Career statistics
Competition	First-class
Matches	12
Runs scored	76
Batting average	7.60
100s/50s	0/0
Top score	37
Catches/stumpings	21/8
- Source: Cricinfo, 4 August 2013

Douglas Charles Gordon Raikes (26 January 1910 – 27 March 1993), known as Gordon Raikes, was an English amateur cricketer. He played for Oxford University in 1931, Gloucestershire County Cricket Club in 1932 and for Kent County Cricket Club in 1948.

Raikes was born at Bristol in 1910. He was educated at Shrewsbury School, where he played cricket, before going up to Queen's College, Oxford. Wisden had picked him out as a strong wicket-keeper whilst at school, describing him as "one of the best wicket-keepers in the schools", and he scored 253 runs in his final year at school. Shrewsbury had been rated "a team to be reckoned with" since 1926. After going up to Cambridge, Raikes made his first-class cricket debut for the university in 1931 against the British Army cricket team at Folkestone, and went on to play five times for them that season. He won his Blue against Cambridge in July. Raikes was the wicket-keeper, preferred in that role to William O'Brien Lindsay who opened the batting; Raikes did not bat in either innings in the 1931 University Match and was named as his team's number 11 batsman.

The following season, Raikes played five first-class matches for Gloucestershire, his home county, before moving to live in Kent where he played for Sevenoaks Vine Cricket Club in the years before World War II. Following the war, he was captain at Sevenoaks until 1949, and then served as chairman of the club for 10 years. Prior to the war he had donated a new score box to the ground. In 1948 he played two first-class matches for Kent, deputising for Godfrey Evans who was playing for England.

In his 12 first-class matches, Raikes scored a total of 76 runs with a highest score of 37. He took 21 catches and made eight stumpings. He died at the age of 83 Guisachan, Tomich, Strathglass, near Inverness in 1993.

== Bibliography ==
- Carlaw, Derek (2020). Kent County Cricketers, A to Z: Part Two (1919–1939) (PDF). Cardiff: ACS.
