= Paul Terry (cricketer) =

English cricketer (born 1959)

Personal information
- Full name: Vivian Paul Terry
- Born: 14 January 1959 (age 67); Osnabrück, Lower Saxony, West Germany
- Height: 6 ft 0 in (1.83 m)
- Batting: Right-handed
- Bowling: Right arm medium
- Relatives: Sean Terry (son)

International information
- National side: England
- Test debut (cap 507): 12 July 1984 v West Indies
- Last Test: 31 July 1984 v West Indies

Domestic team information
- Years: Team
- 1978–1996: Hampshire

Career statistics
Competition	Test	FC	LA
Matches	2	292	310
Runs scored	16	16,427	8,791
Batting average	5.33	36.66	34.20
100s/50s	0/0	38/82	12/50
Top score	8	190	165*
Catches/stumpings	2/–	332/–	148/–
- Source: Cricinfo, 11 February 2010

Vivian Paul Terry (born 14 January 1959) is an English former cricketer, who played in two Tests matches for England in 1984.

== Life and career ==
Terry was born at Osnabrück in West Germany and attended Millfield School, leaving in 1977. He was selected to play for England in 1984 at time of low fortunes for the team, when several players who might otherwise have been selected such as Graham Gooch, Wayne Larkins and Geoff Boycott were suspended after participation in a rebel tour of South Africa, and when they were playing the then best team in the world, the West Indies.

In the latter of his two Test matches Terry's arm was broken by a rising delivery from Winston Davis. Terry returned to the crease later in the match, with one plastered arm in a sling, to face the feared West Indies fast bowling attack. In doing so, it allowed Allan Lamb to score the two additional runs he needed to notch up his century. According to Wisden, subsequent discussion however failed to establish if it had been captain David Gower's intention in sending Terry out to bat to enable Lamb to complete his century or to enable his team to score the twenty-three additional runs needed to avoid the follow on. The confusion had the effect of Terry being required one-handed to face two deliveries from Joel Garner, at the time one of best bowlers in the world. Whatever the motivation, Terry was dismissed second ball, England lost the match (as they did every match that series), and it was Terry's last brave act in England colours.

His first-class cricket career was less problematic, as he garnered a total of 16,427 runs at an average of 36.66. He was part of the Hampshire side which won the Benson and Hedges Cup in 1988 and 1992, and the NatWest Bank Trophy in 1991. In the latter success, he was man of the match in Hampshire's semi-final victory. On that day, as for much of his county career, he formed an effective opening partnership with Chris Smith.

Terry was coach of Hampshire, from the end of the 2002 season until he resigned from the post in 2008. The team won the C&G Trophy in 2005 under his leadership.

Terry also had a successful stint as coach of Melville Cricket Club in the Western Australian Pennant cricket competition. Terry still has strong links to Western Australian cricket from playing and coaching at Perth Cricket Club and the Melville Cricket Club in particular. His son, Sean, debuted for Hampshire in 2012.

== See also ==
- List of Test cricketers born in non-Test playing nations

Sporting positions
Preceded by Jimmy Cook	Hampshire cricket coach 2002–2008	Succeeded by Giles White
