= George Rhodes (cricketer) =

English cricketer (born 1993)

Personal information
- Full name: George Harry Rhodes
- Born: 26 October 1993 (age 33); Birmingham, England
- Height: 6 ft 0 in (1.83 m)
- Batting: Right-handed
- Bowling: Right-arm off break
- Role: All-rounder
- Relatives: SJ Rhodes (father); WE Rhodes (grandfather)

Domestic team information
- Years: Team
- 2016–2019: Worcestershire (squad no. 34)
- 2019: → Leicestershire (on loan)
- 2020–present: Leicestershire (squad no. 34)
- First-class debut: 10 July 2016 Worcestershire v Northamptonshire
- List A debut: 7 June 2016 Worcestershire v Yorkshire

Career statistics
Competition	FC	LA	T20
Matches	34	18	20
Runs scored	1,212	306	103
Batting average	22.44	25.50	11.44
100s/50s	0/7	1/1	0/0
Top score	90	106	30*
Balls bowled	1,175	540	114
Wickets	7	12	10
Bowling average	115.14	41.58	16.40
5 wickets in innings	0	0	0
10 wickets in match	0	0	0
Best bowling	2/83	3/44	4/13
Catches/stumpings	18/–	14/–	8/–
- Source: Cricinfo, 29 August 2022

George Harry Rhodes (born 26 October 1993) is an English cricketer. He made his List A debut on 7 June 2016 for Worcestershire against Yorkshire in the Royal London One-Day Cup. He made his first-class debut on 10 July 2016 for Worcestershire against Northamptonshire in the 2016 County Championship. He is the son of former England cricketer, Steve Rhodes, and grandson of Billy Rhodes, who played for Nottinghamshire, both of whom were wicket-keepers.
