= 1990 Refuge Assurance League =

- Administrator: Test and County Cricket Board
- Cricket format: Limited overs cricket (40 overs per innings)
- Tournament format: League
- Champions: Derbyshire (1st title)
- Participants: 17
- Matches: 136
- Most runs: 902 Jimmy Cook (Somerset)
- Most wickets: 31 Waqar Younis (Surrey)

The 1990 Refuge Assurance League was the twenty-second competing of what was generally known as the Sunday League. The competition was won for the first time by Derbyshire County Cricket Club.

== Standings ==
Team	Pld	W	T	L	N/R	A	Pts	Rp100
Derbyshire (C)	16	12	0	3	1	0	50	87.354
Lancashire	16	11	0	3	1	1	48	100.186
Middlesex	16	10	0	5	1	0	42	95.401
Nottinghamshire	16	10	0	5	1	0	42	89.313
Hampshire	16	9	0	5	2	0	40	88.828
Surrey	16	9	0	6	0	1	38	90.393
Yorkshire	16	9	0	6	0	1	38	83.607
Gloucestershire	16	7	0	7	2	0	32	87.808
Somerset	16	8	0	8	0	0	32	91.255
Kent	16	7	0	8	0	1	30	85.950
Worcestershire	16	7	0	8	1	0	30	84.964
Essex	16	6	0	9	0	1	26	90.570
Sussex	16	5	0	9	0	2	24	85.906
Warwickshire	16	5	0	10	1	0	22	80.695
Glamorgan	16	4	0	11	0	1	18	84.209
Leicestershire	16	4	0	11	1	0	18	76.592
Northamptonshire	16	3	0	12	1	0	14	83.411
Team marked (C) finished as champions. Source: CricketArchive

== Refuge Assurance Cup ==
Following the end of the Sunday League season, the top four teams in the Sunday League competed for the Refuge Assurance Cup. Middlesex emerged as victors, defeating Derbyshire in the final.

== See also ==
Sunday League
