= 1999 CGU National League =

- Administrator: England and Wales Cricket Board
- Cricket format: Limited overs cricket (45 overs per innings)
- Tournament format: League system
- Champions: Lancashire Lightning (5th title)
- Participants: 18
- Matches: 144
- Most runs: 798 Chris Adams (Sussex)
- Most wickets: 30 Ian Harvey (Gloucestershire)

The 1999 CGU National League season was a 45 over English county cricket competition; colloquially known as the Sunday League, it featured many mid-week floodlit matches. For the first time, it was contested through two divisions: Division One and Division Two. Each team played all the others in their division both home and away. The top three teams from Division Two were promoted to the first division for the 2000 season, while the bottom three teams from Division One were relegated. From this season, the counties had nicknames.

Lancashire Lightning won the League for a record fifth time, retaining the title they had won the previous season. Warwickshire Bears, Hampshire Hawks and Essex Eagles were relegated from Division One, while Sussex Sharks, Somerset Sabres and Northamptonshire Steelbacks were promoted from Division Two.

== Teams ==
Division One	Division Two
Essex Eagles	Derbyshire Scorpions
Gloucestershire Gladiators	Durham Dynamos
Hampshire Hawks	Glamorgan Dragons
Kent Spitfires	Middlesex Crusaders
Lancashire Lightning	Northamptonshire Steelbacks
Leicestershire Foxes	Nottinghamshire Outlaws
Warwickshire Bears	Somerset Sabres
Worcestershire Royals	Surrey Lions
Yorkshire Phoenix	Sussex Sharks

== Standings ==
- Pos = Position, Pld = Played, W = Wins, T = Ties, L = Losses, NR = No Results, A = Abandonments, Pts = Points.
- Points awarded: W = 4, L = 0, T = 2, NR = 2, A = 2

=== Division One ===
Team	Pld	W	T	L	NR	A	Pts	NRR
Lancashire Lightning ^{C}	16	11	0	2	1	2	50	7.489
Worcestershire Royals	16	10	0	4	1	1	44	8.948
Kent Spitfires	16	8	0	6	1	1	36	4.300
Gloucestershire Gladiators	16	8	0	8	0	0	32	3.725
Yorkshire Phoenix	16	8	0	8	0	0	32	-0.604
Leicestershire Foxes	16	6	0	8	1	1	28	-1.518
Warwickshire Bears ^{R}	16	6	0	8	2	0	28	-6.083
Hampshire Hawks ^{R}	16	5	0	9	2	0	24	-9.441
Essex Eagles ^{R}	16	3	0	12	0	1	14	-6.657
Source:.

=== Division Two ===
Team	Pld	W	T	L	NR	A	Pts	NRR
Sussex Sharks ^{C}	16	13	0	2	0	1	54	11.950
Somerset Sabres ^{P}	16	13	0	3	0	0	52	8.040
Northamptonshire Steelbacks ^{P}	16	9	0	5	0	2	40	-0.213
Glamorgan Dragons	16	8	1	7	0	0	34	-1.336
Nottinghamshire Outlaws	16	6	0	8	1	1	28	0.408
Surrey Lions	16	5	1	9	0	1	24	0.826
Middlesex Crusaders	16	5	1	10	0	0	22	-1.696
Derbyshire Scorpions	16	4	1	10	0	1	20	-7.994
Durham Dynamos	16	3	0	12	1	0	14	-10.300
Source:.

== Statistics ==
=== Division One ===
==== Most runs ====
Player	Team	Matches	Innings	Runs	Average	HS	100s	50s
John Crawley	Lancashire	14	14	483	43.90	85*	0	3
Graeme Hick	Worcestershire	11	10	480	60.00	110*	1	3
Anthony McGrath	Yorkshire	15	14	450	37.50	75	0	3
Michael Vaughan	Yorkshire	16	16	425	28.33	72	0	2
David Byas	Yorkshire	16	16	417	29.78	87	0	2

==== Most wickets ====
Player	Team	Matches	Overs	Wickets	Average	BBI	4W
Ian Harvey	Gloucestershire	14	107.5	30	15.80	5/41	2
Craig White	Yorkshire	15	114.1	26	16.80	4/25	2
Alamgir Sheriyar	Worcestershire	15	104.5	26	20.76	4/42	1
Chris Silverwood	Yorkshire	12	101.5	24	15.04	4/44	1
Ronnie Irani	Essex	14	102.2	24	19.58	5/33	3

=== Division Two ===
==== Most runs ====
Player	Team	Matches	Innings	Runs	Average	HS	100s	50s
Chris Adams	Sussex	15	15	798	79.80	163	2	5
Piran Holloway	Somerset	15	15	645	58.63	101*	1	6
Michael Di Venuto	Sussex	14	14	596	59.60	94*	0	6
Jamie Cox	Somerset	14	14	593	42.35	101	1	3
Jason Gallian	Nottinghamshire	15	15	490	35.00	130	2	1

==== Most wickets ====
Player	Team	Matches	Overs	Wickets	Average	BBI	4W
Owen Parkin	Glamorgan	15	115	28	18.57	3/31	0
Umer Rashid	Sussex	15	115.4	27	16.92	5/24	2
Tony Penberthy	Northamptonshire	14	108	27	18.66	5/41	3
James Kirtley	Sussex	13	91.2	26	14.57	4/31	2
Steffan Jones	Somerset	15	113.5	26	25.11	4/49	1
