= 1977 John Player League =

- Administrator: Test and County Cricket Board
- Cricket format: Limited overs cricket (40 overs per innings)
- Tournament format: League
- Champions: Leicestershire (2nd title)
- Participants: 17
- Matches: 136
- Most runs: 814 Clive Rice (Nottinghamshire)
- Most wickets: 31 Ken Higgs (Leicestershire)

The 1977 John Player League was the ninth competing of what was generally known as the Sunday League. The competition was won for the second time by Leicestershire County Cricket Club.

== Standings ==
Team	Pld	W	T	L	N/R	A	Pts	R/R
Leicestershire (C)	16	13	0	3	0	0	52	4.626
Essex	16	12	0	2	1	1	52	4.554
Middlesex	16	9	0	5	2	0	40	4.706
Hampshire	16	8	0	5	1	2	38	4.666
Sussex	16	9	0	6	1	0	38	4.237
Gloucestershire	16	6	0	5	2	3	34	4.534
Kent	16	7	0	6	0	3	34	4.399
Glamorgan	16	7	0	7	1	1	32	4.271
Derbyshire	16	6	0	8	0	2	28	4.190
Somerset	16	6	0	8	1	1	28	4.679
Warwickshire	16	5	0	7	0	4	28	4.514
Nottinghamshire	16	6	0	9	1	0	26	4.385
Surrey	16	5	0	9	0	2	24	4.485
Worcestershire	16	5	0	9	1	1	24	3.938
Yorkshire	16	3	0	7	4	2	24	4.185
Lancashire	16	5	0	10	0	1	22	4.417
Northamptonshire	16	4	0	10	1	1	20	3.696
Team marked (C) finished as champions. Source: CricketArchive

== See also ==
Sunday League
