= 2000 Norwich Union National League =

- Administrator: England and Wales Cricket Board
- Cricket format: Limited overs cricket (45 overs per innings)
- Tournament format: League system
- Champions: Gloucestershire Gladiators (1st title)
- Participants: 18
- Matches: 144
- Most runs: 706 Michael Bevan (Sussex)
- Most wickets: 37 Matthew Hoggard (Yorkshire)

The 2000 Norwich Union National League season was a 45 over English county cricket competition; colloquially known as the Sunday League, it featured many mid-week floodlit matches. It was contested through two divisions: Division One and Division Two. Each team played all the others in their division both home and away. The top three teams from Division Two were promoted to the first division for the 2001 season, while the bottom three teams from Division One were relegated. All eighteen counties retained the nicknames from the previous season.

Gloucestershire Gladiators won the League for the first time. Worcestershire Royals, Lancashire Lightning and Sussex Sharks were relegated from Division One, while Surrey Lions, Nottinghamshire Outlaws and Warwickshire Bears were promoted from Division Two.

== Teams ==
Division One	Division Two
Gloucestershire Gladiators	Derbyshire Scorpions
Kent Spitfires	Durham Dynamos
Lancashire Lightning	Essex Eagles
Leicestershire Foxes	Glamorgan Dragons
Northamptonshire Steelbacks	Hampshire Hawks
Somerset Sabres	Middlesex Crusaders
Sussex Sharks	Nottinghamshire Outlaws
Worcestershire Royals	Surrey Lions
Yorkshire Phoenix	Warwickshire Bears

Icon
Team promoted from Division Two
Team relegated from Division One

== Standings ==
- Pos = Position, Pld = Played, W = Wins, T = Ties, L = Losses, NR = No Results, A = Abandonments, Pts = Points.
- Points awarded: W = 4, L = 0, T = 2, NR = 2, A = 2

=== Division One ===
Team	Pld	W	T	L	NR	A	Pts	NRR
Gloucestershire Gladiators ^{C}	16	9	0	6	1	0	38	1.255
Yorkshire Phoenix	16	9	0	7	0	0	36	5.975
Northamptonshire Steelbacks	16	9	0	7	0	0	36	-3.990
Leicestershire Foxes	16	7	2	6	1	0	34	-0.458
Kent Spitfires	16	7	0	7	0	2	32	6.177
Somerset Sabres	16	7	0	8	1	0	30	-0.594
Worcestershire Royals ^{R}	16	6	0	8	2	0	28	-4.236
Lancashire Lightning ^{R}	16	6	1	8	0	1	28	-5.799
Sussex Sharks ^{R}	16	5	1	8	1	1	26	0.315
Source:.

=== Division Two ===
Team	Pld	W	T	L	NR	A	Pts	NRR
Surrey Lions ^{C}	16	11	0	3	0	2	48	11.935
Nottinghamshire Outlaws ^{P}	16	11	0	4	1	0	46	-2.177
Warwickshire Bears ^{P}	16	10	1	5	0	0	42	7.098
Middlesex Crusaders	16	8	1	5	1	1	38	-0.018
Essex Eagles	16	7	0	7	1	1	32	0.359
Glamorgan Dragons	16	7	2	7	0	0	32	-2.184
Durham Dynamos	16	5	0	11	0	0	20	0.105
Hampshire Hawks	16	5	0	11	0	0	20	-5.780
Derbyshire Scorpions	16	2	0	13	1	0	10	-8.999
Source:.

== Statistics ==
=== Division One ===
==== Most runs ====
Player	Team	Matches	Innings	Runs	Average	HS	100s	50s
Michael Bevan	Sussex	12	12	706	117.66	89*	0	9
Sourav Ganguly	Lancashire	13	13	569	51.72	102	2	4
Darren Lehmann	Yorkshire	16	16	564	43.38	89	0	4
David Sales	Northamptonshire	15	15	547	54.70	84*	0	5
Ben Smith	Leicestershire	16	15	508	39.07	90	0	4

==== Most wickets ====
Player	Team	Matches	Overs	Wickets	Average	BBI	4W
Matthew Hoggard	Yorkshire	15	121.3	37	12.37	5/28	2
Ian Harvey	Gloucestershire	14	112.1	34	10.94	5/19	4
Glenn McGrath	Worcestershire	14	112.4	30	8.13	4/9	2
James Averis	Gloucestershire	16	126.2	29	18.51	5/20	2
Steffan Jones	Somerset	16	127.4	28	22.14	4/32	3

=== Division Two ===
==== Most runs ====
Player	Team	Matches	Innings	Runs	Average	HS	100s	50s
Paul Collingwood	Durham	15	15	607	46.69	86	0	7
Simon Katich	Durham	16	16	598	46.00	70*	0	6
Darren Bicknell	Nottinghamshire	16	15	537	41.30	115	1	5
Matthew Maynard	Glamorgan	14	14	501	41.75	88*	0	4
Robin Smith	Hampshire	15	15	464	35.69	88*	0	4

==== Most wickets ====
Player	Team	Matches	Overs	Wickets	Average	BBI	4W
Neil Killeen	Durham	13	104.5	29	14.31	6/31	3
Shane Warne	Hampshire	13	113	25	17.52	4/23	2
Dougie Brown	Warwickshire	15	117	25	17.88	3/13	0
Paul Franks	Nottinghamshire	16	130.3	25	22.48	6/27	1
Nick Phillips	Durham	16	119.3	24	21.54	4/30	1
