= Vibert Greene =

Barbadian cricketer (born 1960)

Cricket information
- Batting: Right-handed
- Bowling: Right-arm medium-fast

Career statistics
| Competition | First-class | List A |
|---|---|---|
| Matches | 28 | 38 |
| Runs scored | 332 | 199 |
| Batting average | 12.29 | 19.90 |
| 100s/50s | 0/1 | 0/0 |
| Top score | 62* | 32* |
| Balls bowled | 4,459 | 1,822 |
| Wickets | 93 | 51 |
| Bowling average | 24.44 | 22.03 |
| 5 wickets in innings | 4 | 0 |
| 10 wickets in match | 1 | 0 |
| Best bowling | 7/96 | 4/15 |
| Catches/stumpings | 11/– | 13/– |
- Source: CricketArchive, 6 December 2022

Victor Sylvester Greene (born 24 September 1960) is a former Barbadian first class cricketer. A right-arm medium-fast bowler, Greene had a short career but played three seasons in England with Gloucestershire.
