= Pro40 =

Former one-day cricket league in England

- Countries: England and Wales
- Administrator: England and Wales Cricket Board
- Format: Limited overs cricket
- First edition: 1969
- Latest edition: 2009
- Number of teams: 18 (2 leagues of 9)
- Current champion: Sussex
- Most successful: Essex, Kent, Lancashire (5 titles each)
- Website: ECB Natwest Pro40 website

The NatWest Pro40 League was a one-day cricket league for first-class cricket counties in England and Wales. It was inaugurated in 1999, but was essentially the old Sunday League retitled to reflect large numbers of matches being played on days other than Sunday.

== Sunday League ==
The Sunday League was launched in 1969, as the second one-day competition in England and Wales alongside the Gillette Cup (launched in 1963). Sponsored by John Player & Sons, the league was called John Player's County League (1969), the John Player League (1970–83), then the John Player Special League (1984–86). The 17 counties of the time played each other in a league format on Sunday afternoons throughout the season. These matches were concise enough to be shown on television, with BBC2 broadcasting one match each week in full until 1980, and then as part of the Sunday Grandstand multi-sport programme. For close finishes for the title, cameras appeared at the grounds where the contenders for the title were competing and the trophy presentation to the victorious team would be on film.

Refuge Assurance replaced John Player Special as the sponsor of the competition, called the Refuge Assurance League, in 1987. In 1988 they introduced an end-of-season play-off competition known as the Refuge Assurance Cup. The top four teams of the league season qualified for this competition, with the first-placed team playing the fourth and the second-placed team playing the third, and the winners of these matches meeting in a final at a neutral venue. This competition lasted until 1991.

On Friday 5 July 1991, Somerset played Lancashire at Taunton in the first Sunday League match not to be played on a Sunday.

The Sunday League was not sponsored in 1992 (Durham making its debut in the competition this season), but in 1993 AXA Equity and Law became the sponsor. The matches this season were 50 overs per innings. The first round of matches that took place on 9 May 1993 were the first official matches in England to be played in coloured clothing and with a white ball. The following season the competition reverted to 40 overs per innings. On Wednesday 23 July 1997 Warwickshire played Somerset at Edgbaston in the first competitive county game to be played under floodlights.

== National League ==
The National League was launched in 1999 with the 18 first-class counties split into two divisions with three teams promoted and relegated from each. The matches were played over 45 overs and the competition was sponsored by Norwich Union. Matches were spread over the week rather than Sundays only.

The counties incorporated nicknames into their official names for the National League, from 2002. For example, Kent became the 'Spitfires', Middlesex the 'Crusaders' and Lancashire were the 'Lightning'. The following season the Scotland Saltires took part in the League until 2005.

The C & G Trophy was restructured, in 2006, from a knock-out competition to a round-robin league format, which took up the early part of the season. The National League was renamed the 'NatWest Pro40' and was played in the later part of the season with the teams playing each other once. Also, two teams instead of three were promoted to the first division and two relegated to the second division. A third promotion/relegation spot was determined in a play-off game between the team third from top in the second division and third from bottom team in the first.

== Replacement ==
In July 2009, the ECB unveiled plans for a revamped county structure involving three competitions, one of which would replace both the Pro40 and the Friends Provident Trophy.

On 27 August 2009, this new competition was announced as a 40-overs-per-innings tournament, similar to the Pro40. The ECB 40, also known as the Clydesdale Bank 40 for sponsorship reasons, would serve as one of the three competitions in county cricket for the next four years, along with the County Championship and the Friends Provident t20.

== Teams ==
Division 1 teams in 2009:

- Durham Dynamos
- Essex Eagles
- Gloucestershire Gladiators
- Hampshire Hawks
- Nottinghamshire Outlaws
- Somerset Sabres
- Sussex Sharks
- Worcestershire Royals
- Yorkshire Carnegie

Division 2 teams in 2009:

- Derbyshire Phantoms
- Glamorgan Dragons
- Kent Spitfires
- Lancashire Lightning
- Leicestershire Foxes
- Middlesex Panthers
- Northamptonshire Steelbacks
- Surrey Brown Caps
- Warwickshire Bears

== Results ==
=== National League ===
Season	1st Division		2nd Division	
Season	Champions	Relegated	Champions	(Also) Promoted
NatWest Pro40
2009	Sussex	Not applicable	Warwickshire	Not applicable
2008	Sussex	Middlesex, Lancashire	Essex	Yorkshire
2007	Worcestershire	Warwickshire, Essex, Northamptonshire	Durham	Somerset, Middlesex
2006	Essex	Glamorgan, Durham, Middlesex	Gloucestershire	Worcestershire, Hampshire
totesport League
2005	Essex	Gloucestershire, Worcestershire, Hampshire	Sussex	Durham, Warwickshire
2004	Glamorgan	Warwickshire, Kent, Surrey	Middlesex	Worcestershire, Nottinghamshire
National League
2003	Surrey	Leicestershire, Yorkshire, Worcestershire	Lancashire	Northamptonshire, Hampshire
Norwich Union League
2002	Glamorgan	Somerset, Durham, Nottinghamshire	Gloucestershire	Surrey, Essex
2001	Kent	Gloucestershire, Surrey, Northamptonshire	Glamorgan	Durham, Worcestershire
Norwich Union National League
2000	Gloucestershire	Worcestershire, Lancashire, Sussex	Surrey	Nottinghamshire, Warwickshire
CGU National League
1999	Lancashire	Warwickshire, Hampshire, Essex	Sussex	Somerset, Northamptonshire

=== Sunday League ===
AXA League

1998	Lancashire

AXA Life League

1997	Warwickshire

AXA Equity & Law League

1996	Surrey
1995	Kent
1994	Warwickshire
1993	Glamorgan

Sunday League

1992	Middlesex

Refuge Assurance League |		Refuge Assurance Cup
1991	Nottinghamshire	1991	Worcestershire
1990	Derbyshire	1990	Middlesex
1989	Lancashire	1989	Essex
1988	Worcestershire	1988	Lancashire
1987	Worcestershire

John Player Special League

1986	Hampshire
1985	Essex
1984	Essex

John Player League

1983	Yorkshire
1982	Sussex
1981	Essex
1980	Warwickshire
1979	Somerset
1978	Hampshire
1977	Leicestershire
1976	Kent
1975	Hampshire
1974	Leicestershire
1973	Kent
1972	Kent
1971	Worcestershire
1970	Lancashire

John Player's County League

1969	Lancashire

=== Tournaments won by county ===
Essex	5
Kent	5
Lancashire	5
Worcestershire	4
Glamorgan	3
Hampshire	3
Sussex	3
Warwickshire	3
Leicestershire	2
Surrey	2
Derbyshire	1
Gloucestershire	1
Middlesex	1
Nottinghamshire	1
Somerset	1
Yorkshire	1
Durham	0
Northamptonshire	0

== See also ==
- National League Division One in 2005
- National League Division Two in 2005
- County Championship – the domestic first class competition in England and Wales
- Friends Provident Trophy (formerly C&G Trophy) – the one-day knock out competition
- Twenty20 Cup – the short-form competition
