= Milton Small =

West Indian cricketer (born 1964)

Personal information
- Full name: Milton Aster Small
- Born: 12 February 1964 (age 62); Blades Hill, Saint Philip, Barbados
- Batting: Right-handed
- Bowling: Right-arm fast-medium

International information
- National side: West Indies
- Test debut (cap 182): 16 March 1984 v Australia
- Last Test: 28 June 1984 v England
- ODI debut (cap 42): 29 February 1984 v Australia
- Last ODI: 14 March 1984 v Australia

Domestic team information
- Years: Team
- 1983–1992: Barbados

Career statistics
Competition	Tests	ODIs	FC	LA
Matches	2	2	18	8
Runs scored	3	–	51	9
Batting average	–	–	4.25	4.50
100s/50s	0/0	–	0/0	0/0
Top score	3*	–	15	7
Balls bowled	270	84	3,107	384
Wickets	4	1	56	8
Bowling average	38.25	54.00	28.23	26.50
5 wickets in innings	0	0	2	0
10 wickets in match	0	0	0	0
Best bowling	3/40	1/40	6/55	4/24
Catches/stumpings	0/–	1/–	5/–	1/–
- Source: Cricket Archive, 19 October 2010

Milton Aster Small (born 12 February 1964) is a former West Indian cricketer who played in two Tests and two ODIs in 1984.
