= Paul Downton =

English cricketer

Personal information
- Full name: Paul Rupert Downton
- Born: 4 April 1957 (age 69); Farnborough, Kent
- Batting: Right-handed
- Bowling: Right-arm off-break
- Relatives: George Downton (father)

International information
- National side: England (1977–1988)
- Test debut (cap 488): 13 February 1981 v West Indies
- Last Test: 30 June 1988 v West Indies
- ODI debut (cap 41): 23 December 1977 v Pakistan
- Last ODI: 23 May 1988 v West Indies

Domestic team information
- Years: Team
- 1977–1979: Kent
- 1980–1991: Middlesex

Career statistics
Competition	Test	ODI	FC	LA
Matches	30	28	314	297
Runs scored	785	242	8,270	3,349
Batting average	19.62	16.13	25.13	22.62
100s/50s	0/4	0/0	6/45	0/9
Top score	74	44*	126*	80*
Balls bowled	0	0	55	0
Wickets	–	–	1	–
Bowling average	–	–	9.00	–
5 wickets in innings	–	–	0	–
10 wickets in match	–	–	0	–
Best bowling	–	–	1/4	–
Catches/stumpings	70/5	26/3	690/89	281/64
Medal record
Men's Cricket
Representing England
ICC Cricket World Cup
Runner-up	1987 India and Pakistan
- Source: CricInfo, 5 October 2023

Paul Rupert Downton (born 4 April 1957) is a retired cricketer and cricket administrator.

He previously served as director of cricket at Kent County Cricket Club (2018-2023) and managing director of the England and Wales Cricket Board between February 2014 and April 2015. He was a part of the English squad which finished as runners-up at the 1987 Cricket World Cup.

He is a former English professional cricketer who played in 30 Test matches and 28 One Day Internationals for the England cricket team between 1977 and 1989. He was a wicket-keeper who played for Kent County Cricket Club from 1977 to 1979 and for Middlesex between 1980 and 1991.

== Life and cricket career ==
Downton was born at Farnborough in metropolitan Kent in 1957. He attended Sevenoaks Prep School, Sevenoaks School and the University of Exeter. He obtained a law degree, a coaching certificate and earned international honours at youth level in both cricket and rugby union.

His father, George, had played briefly for Kent in the post-war period and Downton's early county cricket career was with the same county. Kent shared the 1977 County Championship and won the competition outright in 1978 but Downton became frustrated deputising for Alan Knott in the 1979 season and moved to Middlesex in 1980.

On arrival, he has been described by a teammate there as "an intelligent, dapper individual ... who did not immediately seem to fit with the rather cruder, laddish Londoners in the team". On his first-class debut with Middlesex, the captain, Mike Brearley, chose to use Downton as an opener, and the two registered an opening partnership of 160.

Downton tasted Test cricket for the first time in the West Indies that winter. He was dropped after the first Test against Australia in the summer of 1981 and had to wait until the summer of 1984 for further such honours, when he was picked at home to bolster England's batting options against the West Indies. Though England lost the match, in his first Test back in the team he made his first Test half-century when acting as a stand-in opening batsman following an injury to Andy Lloyd. It began an uninterrupted twenty-three match run in the national team. During this time Downton helped England to a series win in India in 1984-5, and to regain the Ashes against Australia in 1985. His highest Test score of 74 came in England's unlikely triumph at Delhi in the former series. However he was also, along with David Gower, Allan Lamb and Ian Botham, one of only four England cricketers ever present during the "Blackwash" series defeats against the West Indies of 1984 and 1985-6. He was on the winning team against the West Indies when recalled to the England team for the 1987 Cricket World Cup, but England lost in the final to Australia. He played for England for the last time in 1988.

A trustworthy, affable and resourceful team member, Downton played a starring role in Middlesex's successes in the 1980s; they won the County Championship on four occasions from 1980 to 1990. He also shared a number of successes with Middlesex in one-day tournaments, including the 1980 Gillette Cup, the NatWest Trophy in 1984 (sharing a crucial stand of 87 in the final with Clive Radley) and 1988, the Benson & Hedges Cup in 1983 and 1986 and the Refuge Assurance Cup in 1990 (where he won the man of the match in the final). The cricket journalist and Downton's former Middlesex teammate Simon Hughes has described Downton as "gracious, encouraging, unfailingly polite, a diplomat. The kind of chap ... who would offer the bailiffs a glass of sherry if they turned up unannounced." Hughes argues that Downton's calm personality, even when dealing with a difficult colleague, was a significant factor in Downton's success as a player and stand-in captain at Middlesex while Brearley was absent playing for England.

== Post cricket career ==
Downton's cricket career ended in 1991 when he failed to recover from a freak eye injury. A bail lodged in his eye when he was standing up to the stumps during a Sunday League match at Basingstoke in 1990.

After retiring from cricket, he became a stockbroker with James Capel and Cazenove & Co, having been "partly immersed in the City" by the time of his accident.

On 16 October 2013, Downton was appointed to the position of Managing Director of the England and Wales Cricket Board with effect from 1 February 2014. He replaced Hugh Morris who resigned to become chief executive and managing director of Glamorgan County Cricket Club. He left the role on 8 April 2015.

He served as Director of Cricket of Kent between January 2018 and his retirement in September 2023.
