= 2001 Norwich Union League =

- Administrator: England and Wales Cricket Board
- Cricket format: Limited overs cricket (45 overs per innings)
- Tournament format: League system
- Champions: Kent Spitfires (5th title)
- Participants: 18
- Matches: 144
- Most runs: 753 Darren Lehmann (Yorkshire)
- Most wickets: 29 Dougie Brown (Warwickshire)

The 2001 Norwich Union League season was a 45 over English county cricket competition; colloquially known as the Sunday League, it featured many mid-week floodlit matches. It was contested through two divisions: Division One and Division Two. Each team played all the others in their division both home and away. The top three teams from Division Two were promoted to the first division for the 2002 season, while the bottom three teams from Division One were relegated. All eighteen counties retained the nicknames from the previous season.

Kent Spitfires won the League for the fifth time. Gloucestershire Gladiators, Surrey Lions and Northamptonshire Steelbacks were relegated from Division One, while Glamorgan Dragons, Durham Dynamos and Worcestershire Royals were promoted from Division Two.

== Teams ==
Division One	Division Two
Gloucestershire Gladiators	Derbyshire Scorpions
Kent Spitfires	Durham Dynamos
Leicestershire Foxes	Essex Eagles
Northamptonshire Steelbacks	Glamorgan Dragons
Nottinghamshire Outlaws	Hampshire Hawks
Somerset Sabres	Lancashire Lightning
Surrey Lions	Middlesex Crusaders
Warwickshire Bears	Sussex Sharks
Yorkshire Phoenix	Worcestershire Royals

Icon
Team promoted from Division Two
Team relegated from Division One

== Standings ==
- Pos = Position, Pld = Played, W = Wins, T = Ties, L = Losses, NR = No Results, A = Abandonments, Pts = Points.
- Points awarded: W = 4, L = 0, T = 2, NR = 2, A = 2

=== Division One ===
Team	Pld	W	T	L	NR	A	Pts	NRR
Kent Spitfires ^{C}	16	11	1	2	0	2	50	4.264
Leicestershire Foxes	16	11	0	4	1	0	46	7.824
Warwickshire Bears	16	8	0	5	2	1	38	1.580
Somerset Sabres	16	7	1	7	0	1	32	-4.604
Nottinghamshire Outlaws	16	7	0	8	1	0	30	-8.036
Yorkshire Phoenix	16	7	0	9	0	0	28	9.656
Gloucestershire Gladiators ^{R}	16	6	0	9	0	1	26	1.481
Surrey Lions ^{R}	16	6	0	10	0	0	24	-5.051
Northamptonshire Steelbacks ^{R}	16	3	0	12	0	1	14	-9.021
Source:.

=== Division Two ===
Team	Pld	W	T	L	NR	A	Pts	NRR
Glamorgan Dragons ^{C}	16	11	0	3	2	0	48	15.209
Durham Dynamos ^{P}	16	9	0	4	0	3	42	1.740
Worcestershire Royals ^{P}	16	9	0	5	1	1	40	9.617
Hampshire Hawks	16	9	0	6	0	1	38	5.289
Sussex Sharks	16	8	0	7	0	1	34	-1.103
Lancashire Lightning	16	5	0	8	1	2	26	-3.709
Essex Eagles	16	5	1	9	1	0	24	-9.923
Middlesex Crusaders	16	3	1	9	1	2	20	-8.311
Derbyshire Scorpions	16	4	0	12	0	0	16	-7.207
Source:.

== Statistics ==
=== Division One ===
==== Most runs ====
Player	Team	Matches	Innings	Runs	Average	HS	100s	50s
Darren Lehmann	Yorkshire	15	15	753	53.78	191	2	4
Darren Bicknell	Nottinghamshire	16	15	592	39.46	115	1	6
Ali Brown	Surrey	13	13	565	47.08	130	3	1
Peter Bowler	Somerset	11	11	560	50.90	104	1	5
Michael Hussey	Northamptonshire	15	15	510	36.42	96*	0	4

==== Most wickets ====
Player	Team	Matches	Overs	Wickets	Average	BBI	4W
Dougie Brown	Warwickshire	15	116.4	29	18.24	4/56	1
James Averis	Gloucestershire	15	121.3	27	20.22	5/40	3
Martin Saggers	Kent	13	94.4	25	16.56	5/22	1
Steffan Jones	Somerset	14	110.4	22	25.45	4/40	1

=== Division Two ===
==== Most runs ====
Player	Team	Matches	Innings	Runs	Average	HS	100s	50s
Richard Montgomerie	Sussex	15	15	673	48.07	108	1	5
Robert Croft	Glamorgan	15	15	570	40.71	114*	1	5
Matthew Maynard	Glamorgan	16	16	527	52.70	116*	1	3
Vikram Solanki	Worcestershire	15	14	502	41.83	91*	0	5
Nicky Peng	Durham	13	13	495	41.25	121	2	2

==== Most wickets ====
Player	Team	Matches	Overs	Wickets	Average	BBI	4W
Andy Bichel	Worcestershire	15	115.4	27	15.85	5/21	1
Chad Keegan	Middlesex	14	106.5	26	17.73	5/17	2
Chris Schofield	Lancashire	14	72.1	23	15.73	5/31	2
Stuart Lampitt	Worcestershire	15	116	23	19.47	4/37	1
