= List of Combined Universities cricket team players =

The Combined Universities cricket team played in first-class cricket matches between 1993 and 1995 and List A cricket matches between 1975 and 1995. This is a list of the players who appeared in those matches.

== A ==
- Aamer Hameed (1979): Aamer Hameed
- Mark Allbrook (1978): ME Allbrook
- Rob Andrew (1984–1985): CR Andrew
- Michael Atherton (1987–1989): MA Atherton
- Jon Atkinson (1988–1990): JCM Atkinson
- Christopher Aworth (1975): CJ Aworth

== B ==
- Paul Bail (1986–1988): PAC Bail
- Charles Bannister (1976): CS Bannister
- Timothy Barry (1987–1988): TJ Barry
- Jonathan Batty (1994–1995): JN Batty
- James Boiling (1988–1990): J Boiling
- James Bovill (1992–1994): JNB Bovill
- Robin Boyd-Moss (1980–1983): RJ Boyd-Moss
- William Bristowe (1985): WR Bristowe
- Mervyn Brooker (1976): MEW Brooker
- Adrian Brown (1986): AD Brown

== C ==
- Russell Cake (1993–1994): RQ Cake
- Mike Cann (1987): MJ Cann
- Charles Cantlay (1975): CPT Cantlay
- John Carr (1983–1985): JD Carr
- Graham Charlesworth (1993): GM Charlesworth
- John Claughton (1978): JA Claughton
- Simon Clements (1979): SM Clements
- Nicholas Cooper (1979): NHC Cooper
- Archie Cotterell (1984–1985): TA Cotterell
- Peter Cottrell (1979): PR Cottrell
- Stephen Coverdale (1975–1976): SP Coverdale
- Ralph Cowan (1980–1981): RS Cowan
- John Crawley (1991–1993): JP Crawley
- Mark Crawley (1987–1990): MA Crawley
- Mark Cullinan (1983): MR Cullinan
- Ian Curtis (1980–1982): IJ Curtis
- Tim Curtis (1983): TS Curtis

== D ==
- Adrian Dale (1989–1990): A Dale
- John Davidson (1986–1987): JE Davidson
- Andrew Davies (1983–1985): AG Davies
- Jim Dewes (1979): AR Dewes
- Simon Doggart (1981–1983): SJG Doggart

== E ==
- Simon Ecclestone (1994): SC Ecclestone
- Roger Edbrooke (1984): RM Edbrooke
- Alex Edwards (1995): AD Edwards
- Richard Ellis (1981–1983): RGP Ellis
- Scott Ellis (1995): SWK Ellis
- Charles Ellison (1982–1986): CC Ellison
- Alan Ezekowitz (1980): RAB Ezekowitz

== F ==
- David Fell (1985–1986): DJ Fell
- Nigel Fenton (1988): NCW Fenton
- Paul Fisher (1975–1978): PB Fisher
- Iain Fletcher (1991): I Fletcher
- Alan Fordham (1987): A Fordham
- Matthew Fosh (1977–1978): MK Fosh
- Guy Franks (1984–1985): JG Franks
- David Fursdon (1975): ED Fursdon

== G ==
- Jason Gallian (1992–1993): JER Gallian
- Nick Gandon (1979): NJC Gandon
- Stuart Gardiner (1978): SJ Gardiner
- Paul Garlick (1984): PL Garlick
- Trevor Glover (1975): TR Glover
- Chris Goldie (1982): CFE Goldie
- Andrew Golding (1986): AK Golding
- Ian Greig (1977–1979): IA Greig
- Alexander Grimes (1984–1985): ADH Grimes
- Chinmay Gupte (1995): CM Gupte
- David Gurr (1976–1977): DR Gurr

== H ==
- David Hagan (1986): DA Hagan
- Jeremy Hallett (1991–1994): JC Hallett
- Alan Hansford (1989–1991): AR Hansford
- Graham Harding (1988): GD Harding
- Mark Harvey (1995): ME Harvey
- Kevin Hayes (1981–1984): KA Hayes
- Peter Hayes (1975–1976): PJ Hayes
- Steve Henderson (1982–1983): SP Henderson
- Mark Hickson (1988): MP Hickson
- Alastair Hignell (1976–1978): AJ Hignell
- Ian Hodgson (1981–1983): KI Hodgson
- David Holliday (1979): DC Holliday
- Piran Holloway (1991): PCL Holloway
- Antony Hooper (1992): AM Hooper
- Michael Howat (1978–1980): MG Howat
- John Hughes (1994): JG Hughes
- Nasser Hussain (1987–1989): N Hussain

== I ==
- Imran Khan (1975): Imran Khan

== J ==
- Edward Jackson (1976): EJW Jackson
- Steve James (1989–1990): SP James
- Michael Jeh (1992–1993): MPW Jeh
- Rory Jenkins (1991): RHJ Jenkins

== K ==
- Donald Kayum (1978): DA Kayum
- Christopher Keey (1993): CL Keey
- William Kendall (1995): WS Kendall
- Michael Kilborn (1988): MJ Kilborn
- Neil Killeen (1995): N Killeen
- John Knight (1978–1981): JM Knight
- Nick Knight (1990–1991): NV Knight

== L ==
- Michael L'Estrange (1979): MG L'Estrange
- David Littlewood (1978): DJ Littlewood
- Jonathan Longley (1989–1991): JI Longley
- Geoff Lovell (1993): GBT Lovell

== M ==
- Robert MacDonald (1991–1993): RH MacDonald
- Greg Macmillan (1992–1995): GI Macmillan
- Angus MacRobert (1995): AD MacRobert
- Nick Mallett (1980–1981): NVH Mallett
- Gregory Marie (1978–1979): GV Marie
- Vic Marks (1975–1978): VJ Marks
- Andrew Miller (1984–1985)
- Peter Mills (1980–1981): JPC Mills
- Richard Montgomerie (1992–1994): RR Montgomerie
- Russell Morris (1991): RE Morris
- Roger Moulding (1978–1981): RP Moulding
- Aziz Mubarak (1979–1980): AM Mubarak
- Timothy Murrills (1976): TJ Murrills

== O ==
- André Odendaal (1980): A Odendaal
- Tim O'Gorman (1988–1989): TJG O'Gorman
- Jonathan Orders (1978–1981): JOD Orders
- Timothy Orrell (1990): TM Orrell

== P ==
- Paul Parker (1976–1978): PWG Parker
- Treherne Parker (1989): TE Parker
- Gajan Pathmanathan (1976–1983): G Pathmanathan
- Richard Pearson (1991–1993): RM Pearson
- Ian Peck (1980–1981): IG Peck
- Toby Peirce (1994–1995): MTE Peirce
- Michael Petchey (1983): MD Petchey
- Christopher Pitcher (1994): CM Pitcher
- Angus Pollock (1982–1983): AJ Pollock
- Nigel Popplewell (1977–1979): NFM Popplewell
- David Price (1986): DG Price
- Derek Pringle (1979–1982): DR Pringle

== R ==
- Umer Rashid (1995): UBA Rashid
- Perry Rendell (1991): PJ Rendell
- Simon Renshaw (1995): SJ Renshaw
- Paul Roebuck (1983–1985): PGP Roebuck
- Peter Roebuck (1975–1977): PM Roebuck
- Jonathan Ross (1978–1980): CJ Ross
- David Russell (1975): DP Russell
- Neil Russom (1980–1981): N Russom
- Richard Rutnagur (1986): RS Rutnagur

== S ==
- Richard Savage (1976–1978): RL Savage
- Alastair Scott (1985–1987): AMG Scott
- Stuart Shephard (1992–1993): SF Shephard
- Kenneth Siviter (1976): K Siviter
- Steven Skala (1979): SM Skala
- Mike Smith (1988–1990): AM Smith
- Jeremy Snape (1992–1994): JN Snape
- William Snowden (1975): W Snowden
- Martin Speight (1987–1989): MP Speight
- Reuben Spiring (1995): KR Spiring
- Gary Steer (1994–1995): IGS Steer
- John Stephenson (1987): JP Stephenson
- Alastair Storie (1992): AC Storie
- David Surridge (1979): D Surridge
- Iain Sutcliffe (1995): IJ Sutcliffe
- Simon Sutcliffe (1980): SP Sutcliffe

== T ==
- Chris Tavaré (1975–1977): CJ Tavaré
- David Thorne (1984–1986): DA Thorne
- Chris Tolley (1989–1990): CM Tolley
- Giles Toogood (1982–1986): GJ Toogood
- Chris Tooley (1986–1987): CDM Tooley
- Patrick Trimby (1994–1995): PW Trimby
- Graeme Turner (1991): GJ Turner
- Robert Turner (1990): RJ Turner

== U ==
- Benjamin Usher (1992): BC Usher

== V ==
- Willem van der Merwe (1990): WM van der Merwe
- Jonathan Varey (1982–1983): JG Varey

== W ==
- Giles White (1994): GW White
- Andy Whittall (1994–1995): AR Whittall
- Jonathan Wileman (1993): JR Wileman
- Matt Windows (1993–1995): MGN Windows
- Andrew Wingfield Digby (1975–1977): AR Wingfield Digby
