= Walter Lawrence Trophy =

- The Walter Lawrence Trophy
- Awarded for: the fastest hundred scored in an English season
- Country: England
- Reward: £2,500
- First award: 1934
- Currently held by: Liam Livingstone

Highlights
- Most awards: Ian Botham, Graham Lloyd, Leslie Ames, Viv Richards (2)
- Website: www.walterlawrencetrophy.com

The Walter Lawrence Trophy is an annual award made to the player who has scored the fastest century in English domestic county cricket that season, in terms of balls received (not counting wides). Hundreds are considered by a panel of experts which, as of 2020, comprise Michael Atherton, David Gower, Simon Hughes and John Barclay. Those which are adjudged to have been made against declaration bowling are not eligible for the award, although this restriction was not always observed in former years. As of 2020, the recipient of the Walter Lawrence Trophy is also presented with a cheque for £2,500.

The trophy was instituted in 1934 by Sir Walter Lawrence, a builder and cricket enthusiast from Hertfordshire, the first recipient being Frank Woolley. At this stage in its history, the criterion was the time taken to score a hundred rather than the number of balls faced. The award was made every season up to and including 1939 when Lawrence died. When first class cricket resumed in 1945 after the Second World War, Lawrence's son Guy left the presentation of the Trophy in abeyance. It was finally re-instated by Guy's son-in-law, Brian Thornton for the 1966 season. The recipient was then the player who had scored the fastest England Test century in terms of balls faced, at home or away, in the calendar year. The 1970 award was made to Geoffrey Boycott for "the most meritorious innings of the England v The Rest of the World series", but in 1971 the original version of the award was restored. Since 1985, the trophy has been decided in terms of balls faced rather than minutes spent at the crease.

University games were eligible for the trophy until 1995 and from 2001 to 2003. Until 2007, only first-class centuries could qualify for the award, but eligibility was widened in 2008 to include limited overs cricket. Graham Napier became the first man to win the trophy under these new conditions by scoring a 44-ball hundred in a Twenty20 match. Matches involving individual university sides (i.e. University Centre of Cricketing Excellence matches and the Varsity Match) are excluded, although games involving the combined British Universities team are eligible. Three other variants of the Walter Lawrence Trophy are also awarded annually: Walter Lawrence Women's Award, Walter Lawrence MCC Universities Award and Walter Lawrence Schools Award.

Four batsmen have won the main award on more than one occasion, twice each: Ian Botham, Graham Lloyd, Leslie Ames and Viv Richards. Kent have the most winners (8) followed by Somerset (6). The winner of the main award for the 2021 English cricket season is England batter Liam Livingstone, who struck 100 in 42 balls against Pakistan in the first T20 international match.

== Winners ==
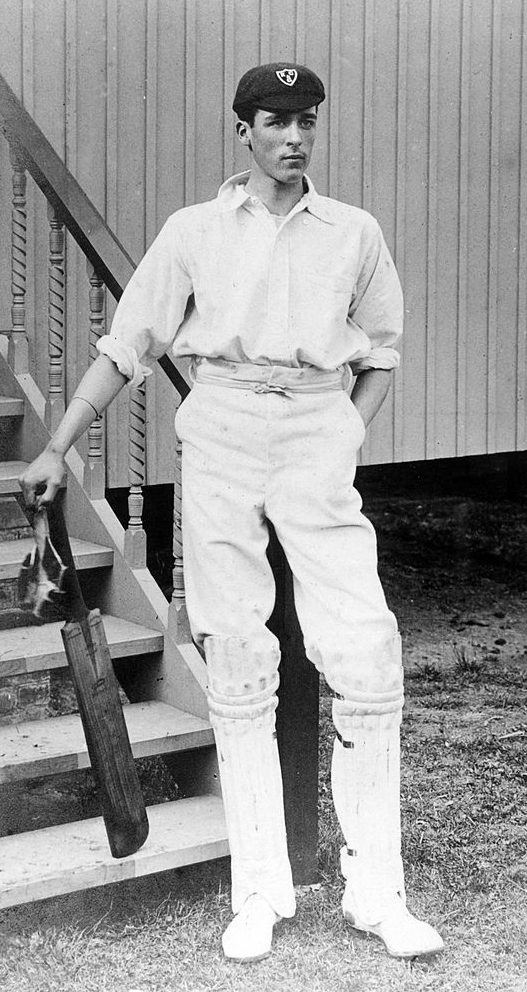
Frank Woolley was the inaugural winner of the trophy in 1934.

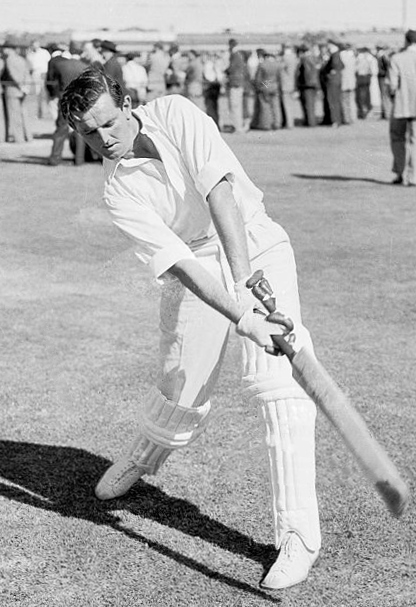
Tom Graveney won the award in 1968.

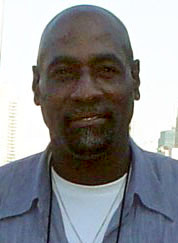
West Indian Viv Richards is one of four players to have won the trophy on two occasions.

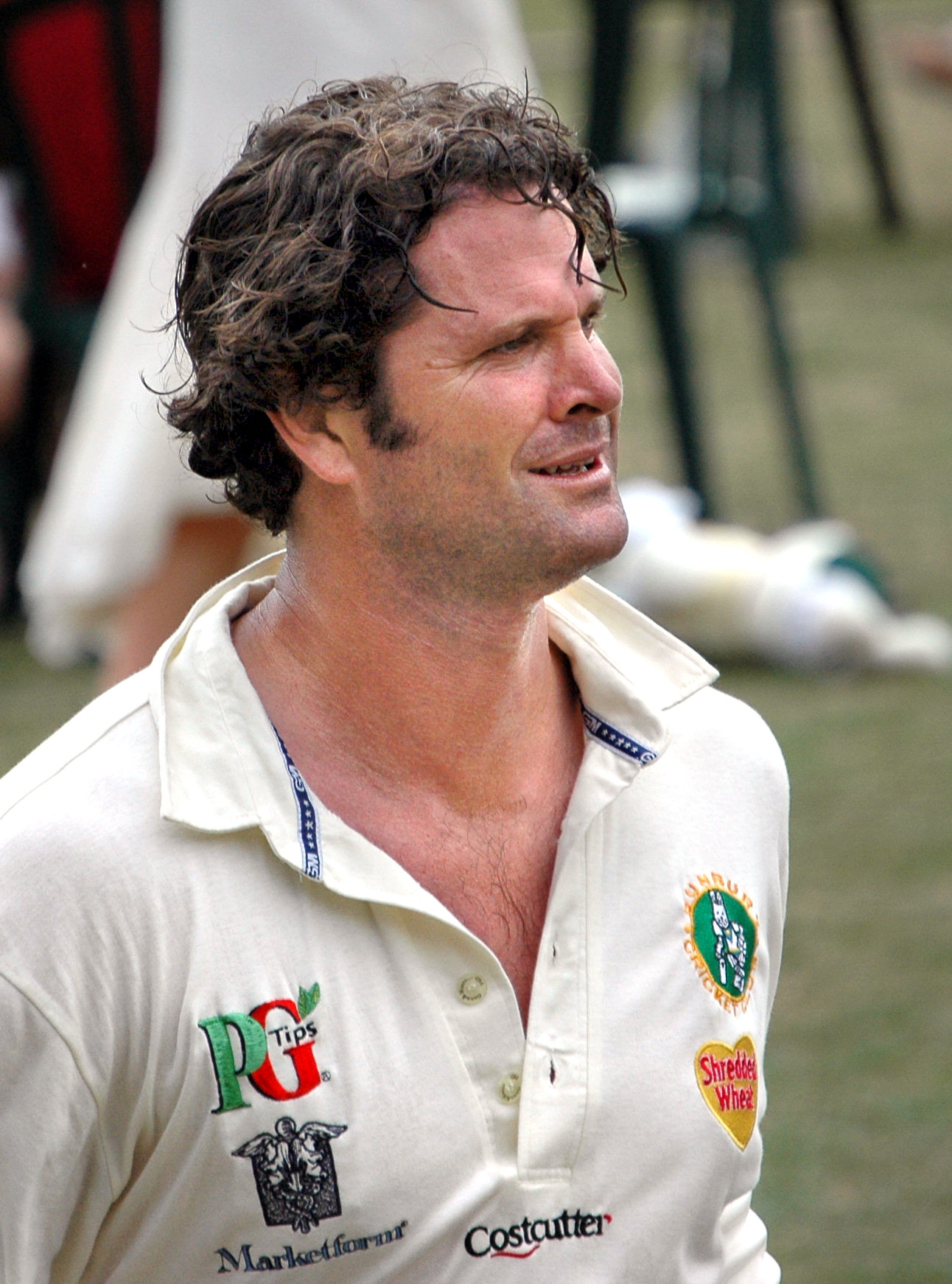
New Zealand batsman Chris Cairns won the award in 1995.

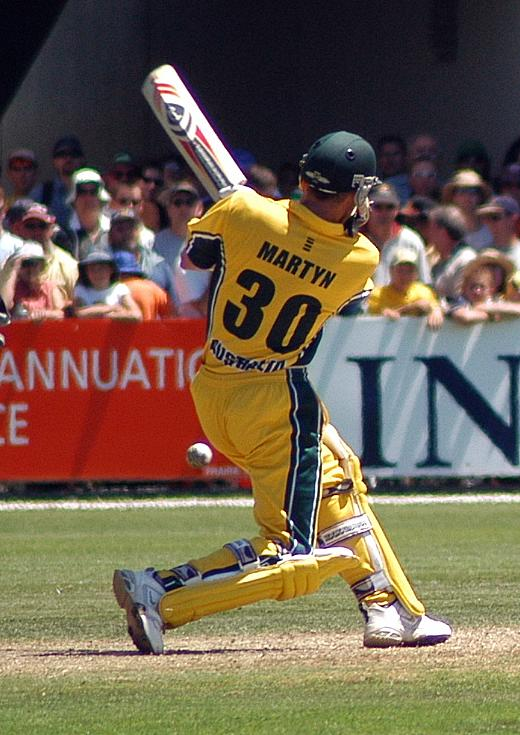
Australian Damien Martyn won the trophy in 2003.

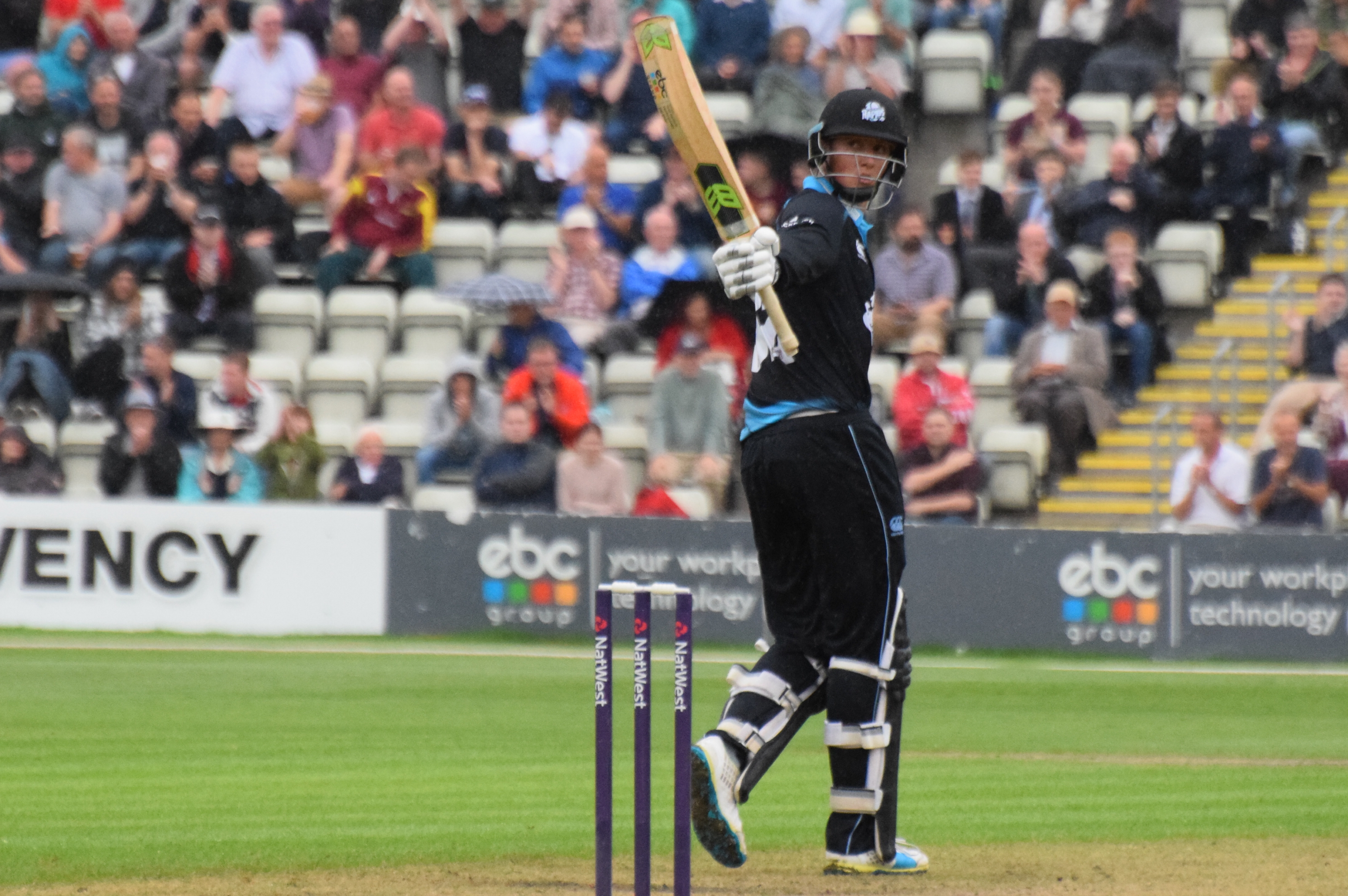
Tom Kohler-Cadmore won the trophy in 2016.

Winners of the Walter Lawrence Trophy
Season	Player	Time taken	For	Against	Venue	Notes
1934	Frank Woolley	63 minutes	Kent	Northamptonshire	Dover	
1935	Harold Gimblett	63 minutes	Somerset	Essex	Frome	Gimblett's first innings in first-class cricket
1936	Leslie Ames	68 minutes	England XI	India	Folkestone	not a Test match
1937	Joe Hardstaff Jr	51 minutes	Nottinghamshire	Kent	Canterbury	
1938	Hugh Bartlett	57 minutes	Sussex	Australians	Hove	after scoring 4 in the first 14 minutes
1939	Leslie Ames	67 minutes	Kent	Surrey	The Oval	
1940 to 1944: no first-class cricket in England
1945 to 1965: Trophy not awarded
Calendar year		Balls faced				
1966	Ken Barrington	153 balls	England	Australia	Melbourne	
1967	Basil D'Oliveira	183 balls	England	India	Leeds	
1968	Tom Graveney	174 balls	England	West Indies	Port-of-Spain	
1969	Colin Milburn	163 balls	England	Pakistan	Karachi	
1970	Geoffrey Boycott	222 balls	England	Rest of the World	The Oval	"most meritorious" innings of the series
Season		Time taken				
1971	Brian Davison	63 minutes	Leicestershire	Northamptonshire	Leicester	
1972	Majid Khan	70 minutes	Glamorgan	Warwickshire	Birmingham	
1973	Asif Iqbal	72 minutes	Kent	MCC	Canterbury	
1974	Garry Sobers	83 minutes	Nottinghamshire	Derbyshire	Ilkeston	
1975	Robin Hobbs	44 minutes	Essex	Australians	Chelmsford	
1976	Alan Knott	70 minutes	Kent	Sussex	Canterbury	
1977	Chris Old	37 minutes	Yorkshire	Warwickshire	Birmingham	against "declaration bowling"
1978	Gordon Greenidge	82 minutes	Hampshire	Glamorgan	Southampton	
1979	Mike Procter	57 minutes	Gloucestershire	Northamptonshire	Bristol	
1980	Viv Richards	66 minutes	West Indies	Glamorgan	Swansea	
1981	Sylvester Clarke	62 minutes	Surrey	Glamorgan	Swansea	batting at number nine
1982	Ian Botham	52 minutes	Somerset	Warwickshire	Taunton	
1983	Steve O'Shaughnessy	35 minutes	Lancashire	Leicestershire	Manchester	against "declaration bowling"
1984	Mike Gatting	79 minutes	Middlesex	Kent	Lord's	
		Balls faced				
1985	Ian Botham	50 balls	Somerset	Warwickshire	Birmingham	
1986	Viv Richards	48 balls	Somerset	Glamorgan	Taunton	
1987	Roland Butcher	73 balls	Middlesex	Sussex	Hove	
1988	Graeme Hick	79 balls	Worcestershire	Surrey	The Oval	
1989	Darren Bicknell	69 balls	Surrey	Essex	The Oval	
1990	Tom Moody	36 balls	Warwickshire	Glamorgan	Swansea	against "declaration bowling"
1991	Ian Austin	61 balls	Lancashire	Yorkshire	Scarborough	
1992	Martin Speight	62 balls	Sussex	Lancashire	Hove	
1993	Paul Johnson	73 balls	Nottinghamshire	Glamorgan	Swansea	
1993	Matthew Maynard	73 balls	Glamorgan	Australians	Neath	
1994	Ken Rutherford	71 balls	New Zealanders	Glamorgan	Swansea	
1995	Chris Cairns	65 balls	Nottinghamshire	Cambridge U	Fenner's	
1996	Graham Lloyd	70 balls	Lancashire	Essex	Chelmsford	
1997	Graham Lloyd	73 balls	Lancashire	Leicestershire	Leicester	
1998	Ali Brown	72 balls	Surrey	Northamptonshire	The Oval	award shared
1998	Carl Hooper	72 balls	Kent	Worcestershire	Canterbury	award shared
1999	Andrew Flintoff	61 balls	Lancashire	Gloucestershire	Bristol	before lunch on the first day
2000	Darren Lehmann	89 balls	Yorkshire	Kent	Canterbury	
2001	Ian Harvey	61 balls	Gloucestershire	Derbyshire	Bristol	
2002	Matthew Fleming	66 balls	Kent	Sri Lankans	Canterbury	
2003	Damien Martyn	65 balls	Yorkshire	Gloucestershire	Leeds	on the last day of the season
2004	Richard Johnson	63 balls	Somerset	Durham	Chester-le-Street	at number ten
2005	Ian Blackwell	67 balls	Somerset	Derbyshire	Taunton	on the last day of the season
2006	Mark Ealham	45 balls	Nottinghamshire	MCC	Lord's	
2007	Marcus North	73 balls	Gloucestershire	Leicestershire	Bristol	
2008	Graham Napier	44 balls	Essex	Sussex	Chelmsford	
2009	Vikram Solanki	47 balls	Worcestershire	Glamorgan	Worcester	
2010	Adam Gilchrist	47 balls	Middlesex	Kent	Canterbury	
2011	Kevin O'Brien	44 balls	Gloucestershire	Middlesex	Uxbridge	
2012	Scott Styris	37 balls	Sussex	Gloucestershire	Hove	2012 Friends Life t20 Quarter-finals
2013	Darren Stevens	44 balls	Kent	Sussex	Canterbury	
2014	Daniel Christian	46 balls	Middlesex	Kent	Canterbury	award shared
2014	Sam Billings	46 balls	Kent	Somerset	Taunton	award shared
2015	David Willey	40 balls	Northamptonshire	Sussex	Hove	
2016	Tom Kohler-Cadmore	43 balls	Worcestershire	Durham	Worcester	
2017	Shahid Afridi	43 balls	Hampshire	Derbyshire	Derby	
2018	Martin Guptill	35 balls	Worcestershire	Northamptonshire	Northampton	
2019	Cameron Delport	38 balls	Essex	Surrey	Chelmsford	
2020	Joe Clarke	44 balls	Nottinghamshire	Durham	Chester-le-Street	
2021	Liam Livingstone	42 balls	England	Pakistan	Nottingham	
2022	Paul Stirling	46 balls	Birmingham Bears	Northants Steelbacks	Birmingham	
2023	Sean Abbott	34 balls	Surrey	Kent	The Oval	
2024	Rishi Patel	41 balls	Leicestershire Foxes	Northants Steelbacks	the County Ground	
