= David Varey =

English cricketer (born 1961)

Personal information
- Full name: David William Varey
- Born: 15 October 1961 (age 65); Darlington, County Durham, England
- Batting: Right-handed
- Role: Occasional wicket-keeper
- Relatives: Jonathan Varey (twin brother)

Domestic team information
- Years: Team
- 1988: Minor Counties
- 1988–1992: Cheshire
- 1984–1987: Lancashire
- 1982–1983: Cheshire
- 1981–1983: Cambridge University

Career statistics
Competition	First-class	List A
Matches	66	15
Runs scored	2,723	183
Batting average	27.23	12.20
100s/50s	2/12	–/–
Top score	156*	38
Balls bowled	10	–
Wickets	–	–
Bowling average	–	–
5 wickets in innings	–	–
10 wickets in match	–	–
Best bowling	–	–
Catches/stumpings	50/1	2/–
- Source: Cricinfo, 2 October 2011

David William Varey (born 15 October 1961) is a former English cricketer. Varey was a right-handed batsman who occasionally fielded as a wicket-keeper. He was born in Darlington, County Durham.

Varey made his first-class debut for Cambridge University against Nottinghamshire in 1981. He made 21 further first-class appearances for the university, the last of which came against Oxford University in 1983. In his 22 first-class appearances for the university, he scored a total of 971 runs at an average of 26.24, with a high score of 156 not out. This score, was his only first-class century for the university, came against Northamptonshire in an innings in which only two other batsman reached double figures. In 1982, he made his debut for Cheshire in the Minor Counties Championship against Shropshire. In his first spell with the county, he played for them in 1982 and 1983.

In 1984, Varey made his first-class debut for Lancashire against Warwickshire. He made 43 further first-class appearances for the county, the last of which came against Northamptonshire in the 1987 County Championship. In his 44 appearances, he scored 1,752 runs at an average of 27.80, with a high score of 112. This score, which was his only first-class score for the county, came against Oxford University in 1985. His List A debut for the county came against Worcestershire in the 1984 Benson & Hedges Cup. He made nine further List A matches for Lancashire, the last of which came against Northamptonshire in the 1987 Refuge Assurance League. In his ten List A matches for Lancashire, he scored 149 runs at an average of 14.90, with a high score of 38. He left Lancashire at the end of the 1987 English cricket season, rejoining Cheshire for the 1988 season. He went on play for Cheshire from 1988 to 1992, making nineteen further appearances in the Minor Counties Championship eight further appearances in the MCCA Knockout Trophy. He played his first List A match for Cheshire in the 1988 NatWest Trophy against Northamptonshire. He made three further appearances in that format for the county, the last of which came against Gloucestershire in the 1992 NatWest Trophy. He scored just 29 runs at an average of 7.25, with a high score of 17. He also played a single List A match for the Minor Counties cricket team against Nottinghamshire in the 1988 Benson & Hedges Cup, scoring 5 runs before being dismissed by Kevin Saxelby.

His twin brother, Jonathan, played first-class cricket for Oxford University.
