= Edbrooke =

Edbrooke is a surname. Notable people with the surname include:

- Frank E. Edbrooke (1840–1921), American architect
- Harry W. J. Edbrooke (1873–1946), American architect
- Paul Edbrooke (born 1978), Australian politician
- Roger Edbrooke (born 1960), English cricketer
- Willoughby J. Edbrooke (1843–1896), American architect
