= Ralph Cowan =

Ralph Cowan may refer to:

- Ralph Cowan (politician) (1902–1990), Canadian politician
- Ralph Cowan (footballer), Scottish footballer
- Ralph Cowan (cricketer) (born 1960), English cricketer
- Ralph Wolfe Cowan (1931–2018), American portrait painter
