= Russom =

Russom is a surname. Notable people with the surname include:

- Gavilán Rayna Russom (born 1974), American electronic music producer, musician and DJ
- Geoffrey Russom, American philologist
- Leon Russom (born 1941), American actor
- Meron Russom (born 1987), Eritrean cyclist
- Neil Russom (born 1958), British cricketer
- Semere Russom (born 1943), Eritrean diplomat
