= Archie Cotterell =

English cricketer

Personal information
- Full name: Thomas Archbold Cotterell
- Born: 12 May 1963 (age 63); Marylebone, London, England
- Batting: Right-handed
- Bowling: Slow left-arm orthodox

Domestic team information
- Years: Team
- 1983–1985: Cambridge University

Career statistics
Competition	First-class	List A
Matches	29	7
Runs scored	617	15
Batting average	19.28	3.75
100s/50s	0/2	0/0
Top score	69*	6
Balls bowled	4,796	426
Wickets	41	5
Bowling average	62.78	57.00
5 wickets in innings	1	0
10 wickets in match	0	n/a
Best bowling	5/89	2/42
Catches/stumpings	6/–	2/–
- Source: Cricinfo, 3 September 2019

Thomas Archbold Cotterell (born 12 May 1963) is an English former cricketer and a novelist.

Cotterell was born at Marylebone in May 1963, and was educated at Downside School, before going up to Peterhouse, Cambridge. While studying at Cambridge, he made his debut in first-class cricket for Cambridge University against Glamorgan at Fenner's in 1983. He played first-class cricket for Cambridge until 1985, making 29 appearances. Playing as an all-rounder, he scored 617 runs in his 29 appearances for Cambridge, at an average of 19.28 and a high score of 69 not out. With his slow left-arm orthodox bowling, Cotterell took 41 wickets at a bowling average of 62.78. Though largely ineffective with the ball, he did take a five-wicket haul against Essex in 1983, with figures of 5 for 89. In addition to playing first-class cricket while at Cambridge, he also made seven List A one-day appearances for the Combined Universities cricket team, making four appearances in the 1984 Benson & Hedges Cup and three appearances in the 1985 Benson & Hedges Cup.

After graduating from Cambridge, Cotterell worked in the City of London as an equities salesman for broking firm Hoare Govett and the investment bank Morgan Stanley. He left his job in the City in 2000 to pursue his ambition to become a novelist, later writing the psychological thriller What Alice Knew, as well as contributing pieces to The Daily Telegraph. He is married to Emily, they have three children.
