= Alexander Grimes =

English cricketer

Personal information
- Full name: Alexander David Hugh Grimes
- Born: 8 January 1965 (age 61); Beirut, Lebanon
- Nickname: Skander
- Batting: Right-handed
- Bowling: Right-arm medium

Domestic team information
- Years: Team
- 1984–1985: Cambridge University

Career statistics
Competition	First-class	List A
Matches	13	6
Runs scored	101	1
Batting average	9.18	1.00
100s/50s	0/0	0/0
Top score	22*	1*
Balls bowled	1,518	354
Wickets	12	13
Bowling average	75.58	19.00
5 wickets in innings	0	1
10 wickets in match	0	n/a
Best bowling	3/99	5/36
Catches/stumpings	3/–	1/–
- Source: Cricinfo, 3 September 2019

Alexander David Hugh Grimes (born 8 January 1965) is an English former cricketer.

Grimes was educated at Tonbridge School, before going up to Pembroke College, Cambridge. While studying at Cambridge, he made his debut in first-class cricket for Cambridge University against Hampshire at Fenner's in 1984. He played first-class cricket for Cambridge until 1985, making thirteen appearances. Playing as a right-arm medium pace bowler, Grimes was ineffective in his thirteen matches for Cambridge, taking 12 wickets at an expensive average of 75.58 and best figures of 3 for 99. Additionally, with the bat, he scored 101 runs with a high score of 22 not out. In addition to playing first-class cricket while at Cambridge, he also made six List A one-day appearances for the Combined Universities cricket team, making three appearances apiece in the 1984 and 1985 Benson & Hedges Cup. Grimes was a more effective bowler in one-day cricket, taking 13 wickets at an average of 19.00, which included a five-wicket haul when he took figures of 5 for 36 against Sussex.
