= Peter Hayes (cricketer) =

English cricketer (born 1954)

Personal information
- Full name: Peter James Hayes
- Born: 20 May 1954 (age 72); Crowborough, Sussex, England
- Batting: Right-handed
- Bowling: Right-arm medium
- Relatives: Married to Catherine Hayes, 2 children Caroline Hayes(1994) and Jack Hayes(1996)

Domestic team information
- Years: Team
- 1981–1990: Suffolk
- 1974–1977: Cambridge University

Career statistics
Competition	First-class	List A
Matches	27	12
Runs scored	343	48
Batting average	10.39	6.00
100s/50s	–/1	–/–
Top score	56*	26*
Balls bowled	4,241	606
Wickets	51	7
Bowling average	35.92	36.71
5 wickets in innings	1	–
10 wickets in match	–	–
Best bowling	5/48	2/14
Catches/stumpings	19/–	5/–
- Source: Cricinfo, 26 July 2011

Peter James Hayes (born 20 May 1954) is a former English cricketer. Hayes was a right-handed batsman who bowled right-arm medium pace. He was born in Crowborough, Sussex.

Hayes made his first-class debut for Cambridge University against Gloucestershire in 1974. He made 26 further first-class appearances for the university, the last of which came against Oxford University in 1977. In his 27 first-class appearance for the university, he scored 343 runs at an average of 10.93, with a high score of 56 not out. This score, his only first-class fifty, came against Glamorgan in 1977. With the ball, he took 51 wickets at a bowling average of 35.92, with best figures of 5/48. These figures, his only five wicket haul, came against Nottinghamshire in 1975. He made his List A debut for Cambridge University against Essex in the 1974 Benson & Hedges Cup. He played a further List A match in that season's competition for the university against Surrey. The following season he played List A cricket for the Combined Universities, playing his first match for the team against Hampshire in the Benson & Hedges Cup. He made 3 further List A appearances for the team, the last of which came against Kent in the 1976 Benson & Hedges Cup.

After completing his studies, he joined Suffolk in 1981, making his debut for the county in that season's Minor Counties Championship against Buckinghamshire. He played Minor counties cricket for Suffolk from 1981 to 1990, making 64 Minor Counties Championship and 8 MCCA Knockout Trophy appearances. He made his first List A appearance for Suffolk against Derbyshire in the 1981 NatWest Trophy. He made 5 further List A appearances for the county, the last of which came against Northamptonshire in the 1989 NatWest Trophy. In his 6 List A matches for Suffolk, he took 5 wickets at an average of 22.00, with best figures of 2/14. With the bat, he scored 40 runs at an average of 10.00, with a high score of 26 not out. He retired at the end of the 1990 season.
