= Ian Hodgson =

Personal information
- Full name: Kenneth Ian Hodgson
- Born: 24 February 1960 (age 66); Port Elizabeth, Cape Province, South Africa
- Batting: Right-handed
- Bowling: Right-arm medium

Domestic team information
- Years: Team
- 1981–1983: Combined Universities
- 1981–1983: Cambridge University
- 1980–1987: Buckinghamshire

Career statistics
Competition	First-class	List A
Matches	27	11
Runs scored	663	111
Batting average	25.32	11.10
100s/50s	–/1	–/–
Top score	50	41
Balls bowled	4,022	408
Wickets	55	7
Bowling average	38.05	41.42
5 wickets in innings	1	–
10 wickets in match	1	–
Best bowling	8/68	3/30
Catches/stumpings	4/–	6/–
- Source: Cricinfo, 22 June 2011

Kenneth Ian Hodgson (born 24 February 1960) is a South African born former English cricketer. Hodgson was a right-handed batsman who bowled right-arm medium pace. He was born in Port Elizabeth, Cape Province.

Hodgson made his debut for Buckinghamshire in the 1980 Minor Counties Championship against Hertfordshire. Hodgson played Minor counties cricket for Buckinghamshire from 1980 to 1987, which included 39 Minor Counties Championship matches and 6 MCCA Knockout Trophy matches. His first-class debut came for Cambridge University in 1981 against Essex. He played a further 26 first-class matches for the university, the last of which came against Oxford University in 1983. As an all-rounder, Hodgson scored 633 runs at an average of 25.32, with a high score of exactly 50, which came against Lancashire in 1982. With the ball, he took 55 wickets at 38.05 a piece, with best figures of 8/68. His best figures came against Glamorgan in 1982, with Hodgson taking his only five-wicket haul in Glamorgans' first-innings, while in their second-innings he took 2 wickets, therefore not only giving him his only five wicket haul, but also his only ten wicket haul in a match. While attending Cambridge University, Hodgson made his List A debut for Combined Universities against Kent in the 1981 Benson & Hedges Cup. He played List A cricket for the team on 5 further occasions spread over the 1982 Benson & Hedges Cup and 1983 Benson & Hedges Cup. He scored 60 runs for Combined Universities at an average of 12, while making a high score of 41. While with the ball, Hodgson took 7 wickets for the team at an average of 25.71, with best figures of 3/30.

While undertaking his studies at Cambridge University, Hodgson still managed to play for Buckinghamshire. He made his first List A appearance for the county in the 1984 NatWest Trophy against Lancashire. He played 4 further List A matches for the county, the last coming against Kent in the 1988 NatWest Trophy. His 5 appearances in limited-overs cricket for Buckinghamshire yielded him 51 runs at an average of 10.20, with a high score of 24. He bowled a total of 24 overs for Buckinghamshire, though without taking a wicket. His playing time with Buckinghamshire finished at the end of the 1987 season.
