= Cantlay =

Cantlay is a surname. Notable people with the surname include:

- Charles Cantlay (born 1954), a British businessman and cricketer
- Patrick Cantlay (born 1992), American golfer

== See also ==
- Cantley (disambiguation)
