= Ralph Cowan (cricketer) =

English cricketer (born 1960)

Personal information
- Full name: Ralph Stewart Cowan
- Born: 30 March 1960 (age 66); Hameln, Lower Saxony, West Germany
- Batting: Right-handed
- Bowling: Right-arm medium
- Role: Occasional wicket-keeper

Domestic team information
- Years: Team
- 1980–1982: Oxford University
- 1982–1983: Sussex

Career statistics
| Competition | First-class | List A |
|---|---|---|
| Matches | 28 | 8 |
| Runs scored | 1,406 | 36 |
| Batting average | 29.91 | 6.00 |
| 100s/50s | 3/8 | 0/0 |
| Top score | 143* | 13 |
| Balls bowled | 1,278 | 36 |
| Wickets | 9 | 1 |
| Bowling average | 88.66 | 21.00 |
| 5 wickets in innings | 0 | 0 |
| 10 wickets in match | 0 | 0 |
| Best bowling | 2/75 | 1/21 |
| Catches/stumpings | 17/1 | 0/– |
- Source: Cricinfo, 18 February 2010

Ralph Stewart Cowan (born 30 March 1960) is an English former cricketer. Cowan was a right-handed batsman who bowled right-arm medium pace. He also occasionally fielded as a wicket-keeper.

== Career ==
While studying at the University of Oxford, Cowan made his first-class debut for Oxford University Cricket Club against Warwickshire in 1980. He made 21 further first-class appearances for the university, the last of which came against Cambridge University at The University Match at Lord's in 1982. In his 22 first-class matches the university, he scored a total of 1,234 runs at an average of 34.27, with a high score of 143 not out. This score came against Northamptonshire in 1982, in what was his most successful season in first-class cricket, with Cowan scoring 533 runs at an average of 44.41. Cowan made three centuries and seven half centuries for the university. With the ball, he took 9 wickets, though at an expensive bowling average of 81.88, with best figures of 2/75. It was during this period that he made his List A debut for the Combined Universities against Northamptonshire in the 1980 Benson & Hedges Cup. He made four further List A appearances for the team, the last of which came against Essex in the 1981 Benson & Hedges Cup. In one-day cricket, he struggled compared to his favourable first-class form, scoring 25 runs at an average of 5.00, with a high score of 13.

Having been associated with Sussex since appearing for the county Second XI in 1979, Cowan made his first team debut for the county at the end of the 1982 County Championship against Nottinghamshire. Cowan made just five further first-class appearances for Sussex, the last of which came against Surrey in the 1983 County Championship. He scored 152 runs in his six matches, passing fifty just once and averaging 15.63. He also played three List A matches for Sussex, all coming in the 1983 season, against the Minor Counties in the 1983 Benson & Hedges Cup, and Leicestershire and Surrey in the John Player Special League. He scored just 11 runs in his three one-day matches for Sussex.
