= Ian Curtis (disambiguation) =

Ian Curtis (1956–1980) was an English musician and the lead singer of Joy Division.

Ian Curtis may also refer to:

- Ian Curtis (cricketer) (born 1959), British cricketer
- Ian Curtis (actor) (born 1972), British actor
- Ian Curtis Wishlist, a song by Xiu Xiu on the 2003 album A Promise

== See also ==
- Ian Curteis (1935–2021), British director
