= Kevin Hayes (cricketer) =

English cricketer (born 1962)

Personal information
- Full name: Kevin Anthony Hayes
- Born: 26 September 1962 (age 64); Thurnscoe, West Riding of Yorkshire, England
- Batting: Right-handed
- Bowling: Right-arm medium

Domestic team information
- Years: Team
- 1988–1991: Cumberland
- 1981–1984: Oxford University
- 1980–1986: Lancashire

Career statistics
Competition	First-class	List A
Matches	44	21
Runs scored	1,595	267
Batting average	23.80	15.70
100s/50s	2/7	–/2
Top score	152	67
Balls bowled	961	240
Wickets	17	4
Bowling average	31.58	31.00
5 wickets in innings	1	–
10 wickets in match	–	–
Best bowling	6/58	3/40
Catches/stumpings	15/–	2/–
- Source: Cricinfo, 5 December 2011

Kevin Anthony Hayes (born 26 September 1962) is an English former cricketer. Hayes was a right-handed batsman who bowled right-arm medium pace. He was born at Thurnscoe, West Riding of Yorkshire.

== Career ==
=== Oxford University and Lancashire ===
Hayes made his first-class debut for Lancashire against Oxford University in 1980. This was his only appearance for the county that season. The following year, Hayes began his university studies at the University of Oxford, making his first-class cricket debut for Oxford University against Gloucestershire at the University Parks, scoring a half century on debut. He made five first-class appearances for the university in 1981, including The University Match at Lord's Cricket Ground where he made another half century. His List A debut came in this season when he appeared twice for a Combined Universities team in the Benson & Hedges Cup against Somerset and Essex. He also made two further first-class appearances that season for Lancashire, against the touring Sri Lankans and Worcestershire in the County Championship, as well as a single List A appearance for the county in the John Player League against Worcestershire. Ten further first-class appearances for Oxford University followed in 1982, with Hayes scoring what would be his only century for the university against Warwickshire, with a score of 152. In what was his most successful season in first-class cricket in terms of runs, Hayes also made three first-class appearances for Lancashire, with his thirteen first-class matches in that season bringing him a total of 594 runs at an average of 31.26, with a high score of 152. In one-day cricket, Hayes made four appearances for the Combined Universities in the Benson & Hedges Cup, as well as appearing once for Lancashire in the John Player Special League.

He appeared in just three first-class matches for Oxford University in 1983, while for Lancashire he appeared five times in the County Championship, A part-time medium pace bowler, Hayes took his only career five wicket haul during this season, with figures of 6/58 in a match between Oxford University and Warwickshire. He made just two List A appearances in 1983, one for the Combined Universities against Surrey in the Benson & Hedges Cup and another for Lancashire against the same opposition in the John Player Special League. The following season was his last playing for Oxford University, with him making eight appearances, the last of which saw him play in The University Match at Lord's. In total, Hayes made 26 first-class appearances for the university, scoring 1,009 runs at an average of 22.93. With the ball, he took 17 wickets at a bowling average of 30.11.

=== Combined Universities team and further Lancashire appearances ===
This season also saw him play his final List A matches for the Combined Universities in the Benson & Hedges Cup, with Hayes making four appearances for the team in that season. In total, he made eleven appearances for the team, scoring 174 runs at an average of 15.81, with a high score of 67, which came against Hampshire in 1984. He also made a handful of appearances for Lancashire that year. Continuing to play for Lancashire, he made five first-class appearances in 1985, scoring 310 runs at an average of 44.28, with a high score of 117. This was his only century for Lancashire and came against Somerset at Old Trafford. He made three List A appearances for the county that season, which represented his last appearances in that format for Lancashire. His total of eight List A appearances for the county bought him little success, with Hayes scoring just 64 runs at an average of 16.00 and a high score of 53. He made just one further appearance for the county, in a first-class match in 1986 against Glamorgan. He played eighteen first-class matches for Lancashire, scoring 586 runs at an average of 25.47.

=== Cumberland and minor leagues ===
He later joined Cumberland for the 1988 season, making his debut for the county against Lincolnshire in the MCCA Knockout Trophy. He played Minor counties cricket for Cumberland from 1988 to 1991, making ten Minor Counties Championship and six MCCA Knockout Trophy appearances. He also made two List A appearances, against Worcestershire in the 1988 NatWest Trophy and Lancashire in the 1989 NatWest Trophy.
