= Petchey =

Petchey is a surname. Notable people with the surname include:

- George Petchey (1931–2019), British footballer and manager
- Jack Petchey (1925–2024), British businessman and philanthropist
- Mark Petchey (born 1970), British tennis player
- Michael Petchey (born 1958), British cricketer
