= Steve Sylvester =

Steve Sylvester may refer to:

- Steve Sylvester (American football) (born 1953), American football player
- Steve Sylvester, vocalist of Death SS, Italian heavy metal band
- Steven Sylvester (born 1968), English cricketer
