= Jonathan Longley =

American-born English cricketer (born 1969)

Personal information
- Full name: Jonathan Ian Longley
- Born: 12 April 1969 (age 57); New Brunswick, New Jersey, USA
- Batting: Right-handed
- Role: Occasional wicketkeeper

Domestic team information
- Years: Team
- 1989–1993: Kent
- 1994–1996: Durham

Career statistics
Competition	First-class	List A
Matches	35	63
Runs scored	1,381	1,311
Batting average	23.40	23.41
100s/50s	2/8	0/7
Top score	110	92
Balls bowled	24	0
Wickets	0	–
Bowling average	–	–
5 wickets in innings	–	–
10 wickets in match	–	–
Best bowling	–	–
Catches/stumpings	18/–	9/–
- Source: CricInfo, 23 December 2009

Jonathan Ian Longley (born 12 April 1969) is an American born former English professional cricketer who played for Kent and Durham County Cricket Clubs between 1989 and 1996. Longley was a right-handed batsman who played occasionally as a wicketkeeper.

Longley was born at New Brunswick, New Jersey and educated at Tonbridge School in Kent and Durham University. He was a "free-scoring batsman" at school and made his first-class cricket debut for Kent in the 1989 County Championship against Essex. He made his List-A cricket debut during the same season for Combined Universities.

Longley played 10 first-class and 14 one-day matches for Kent but found his opportunities limited. He left the county and joined Durham ahead of the 1994 season. Longley made his Durham debut in 1994, scoring a century on debut and going on to play 25 first-class and 36 one-day matches for the county. As well as playing for Kent and Durham he played 13 matches for the Combined Universities between 1989 and 1991.
