= Mark Hickson =

English cricketer

Personal information
- Full name: Mark Peter Hickson
- Born: 19 July 1964 (age 62); Farnborough, Kent, England
- Batting: Right-handed
- Bowling: Right-arm medium

Career statistics
Competition	List A
Matches	2
Runs scored	14
Batting average	7.00
100s/50s	–/–
Top score	10
Balls bowled	114
Wickets	1
Bowling average	91.00
5 wickets in innings	–
10 wickets in match	–
Best bowling	1/27
Catches/stumpings	–/–
- Source: Cricinfo, 29 August 2019

Mark Peter Hickson (born 19 July 1964) is an English former cricketer.

Hickson was born at Farnborough. He was educated at Tonbridge School, before going up to Durham University. While studying at Durham, Hickson was selected in the British Universities squad for the 1988 Benson & Hedges Cup, making two List A one-day appearances in the competition against Somerset at Oxford, and Glamorgan at Cardiff. He scored 14 runs in his two matches, as well as taking a single wicket.
