= Rory Jenkins =

English cricketer

Personal information
- Full name: Rory Harry John Jenkins
- Born: 29 June 1970 (age 56); Leicester, Leicestershire, England
- Batting: Right-handed
- Bowling: Right-arm medium

Domestic team information
- Years: Team
- 1991: Combined Universities
- 1990-1993: Cambridge University
- 1990: Devon

Career statistics
Competition	FC	LA
Matches	18	4
Runs scored	123	9
Batting average	8.20	9.00
100s/50s	–/–	–/–
Top score	20	9
Balls bowled	2,878	156
Wickets	24	1
Bowling average	70.29	141.00
5 wickets in innings	1	–
10 wickets in match	–	–
Best bowling	5/100	1/58
Catches/stumpings	4/–	2/–
- Source: Cricinfo, 13 February 2011

Rory Harry John Jenkins (born 29 June 1970) is a former English cricketer. Jenkins was a right-handed batsman who bowled right-arm medium pace. He was born in Leicester and educated at Oundle and Downing College, Cambridge.

Jenkins made his first-class debut for Cambridge University against Northamptonshire at Fenner's. In the year of his Cambridge University debut he also played for Devon in 4 Minor Counties Championship matches. From 1990 to 1993, he represented the university in 18 first-class matches, the last of which came against Sussex at the County Ground, Hove. In his 18 first-class matches he scored 123 runs at a batting average of 8.20, with a high score of 20. With the ball he took 24 wickets at a bowling average of 70.29, with a single five wicket haul which gave him best figures of 5/100.

In 1991, he played 4 List A matches for Combined Universities in the 1991 Benson & Hedges Cup, making his List A debut against Gloucestershire and playing his List A match against Northamptonshire. A bowler, Jenkins owing to back injury disappointed with the ball in the one-day format, claiming just a single wicket at an average of 141.00, with best figures of 1/58. Jenkins played for the combined Oxbridge team against the West Indies in 1991 at The Parks taking three wickets.
