= Christopher Pitcher =

English cricketer (born 1973)

Personal information
- Full name: Christopher Michael Pitcher
- Born: 26 August 1973 (age 53); Croydon, Surrey, England
- Batting: Right-handed
- Bowling: Right-arm medium

Domestic team information
- Years: Team
- 1992–1994: Cambridge University

Career statistics
Competition	First-class
Matches	25
Runs scored	239
Batting average	11.38
100s/50s	–/–
Top score	43
Balls bowled	3,558
Wickets	37
Bowling average	55.48
5 wickets in innings	–
10 wickets in match	–
Best bowling	4/37
Catches/stumpings	9/–
- Source: Cricinfo, 1 September 2019

Christopher Michael Pitcher (born 26 August 1973) is an English former first-class cricketer.

Pitcher was born at Croydon in August 1973 and later studied at Selwyn College, Cambridge. While studying at Cambridge, he made his debut in first-class cricket for Cambridge University against Leicestershire at Fenner's in 1992. He played first-class cricket for Cambridge until 1994, making 24 appearances. Pitcher scored a total of 226 runs in his 24 matches for Cambridge, at an average of 10.76 and a high score of 43. With his right-arm medium pace bowling, he took 37 wickets at a high average of 54.45, with best figures of 4 for 37. He also made a first-class appearance for the Combined Universities cricket team against the touring New Zealanders in 1994.
