= William Bristowe =

English cricketer (born 1963)

Personal information
- Full name: William Robert Bristowe
- Born: 17 November 1963 (age 62); Woking, Surrey, England
- Batting: Right-handed
- Bowling: Right-arm off break

Domestic team information
- Years: Team
- 1984–1985: Oxford University

Career statistics
Competition	First-class	List A
Matches	10	1
Runs scored	260	0
Batting average	21.66	0.00
100s/50s	–/–	–/–
Top score	42*	0
Balls bowled	6	0
Wickets	0	–
Bowling average	–	–
5 wickets in innings	–	–
10 wickets in match	–	–
Best bowling	–	–
Catches/stumpings	5/–	–/–
- Source: Cricinfo, 30 August 2019

William Robert Bristowe (born 17 November 1963) is an English former cricketer.

Bristowe was born at Woking in November 1963. He was educated at Charterhouse School, before going up to St Edmund Hall, Oxford. While studying at Oxford, he made his debut in first-class cricket for Oxford University against Glamorgan at Oxford in 1984. He played first-class cricket for Oxford until 1985, making ten appearances. He scored a total of 260 runs in his ten matches at an average of 21.66, with a high score of 42 not out. In addition to playing first-class cricket while at Oxford, Bristowe also appeared in one List A one-day match for the Combined Universities cricket team in the 1985 Benson & Hedges Cup at Chelmsford, during which he was dismissed without scoring by Derek Pringle.
