= Cantley =

Cantley may refer to:

== Places ==
- Cantley, Norfolk, a village in the county of Norfolk, England
- Cantley, South Yorkshire, a suburb of Doncaster, England
- Cantley, Quebec, a town in the province of Quebec, Canada

== People ==
- Joseph Cantley (1910–1993), British High Court judge
- Lewis C. Cantley (born 1949), American cell biologist
- Nathaniel Cantley (1847–1888), British botanist

== See also ==
- Cantlay, a surname
