= Perry Rendell =

English cricketer (born 1970)

Personal information
- Full name: Perry John Rendell
- Born: 20 January 1970 (age 56); Weston-super-Mare, Somerset, England
- Batting: Right-handed
- Bowling: Right-arm medium

Domestic team information
- Years: Team
- 1987–1995: Somerset
- 1991: Combined Universities
- 1994: Herefordshire
- LA debut: 3 September 1990 Somerset v Sri Lankans
- Last LA: 25 April 1991 Combined Universities v Derbyshire

Career statistics
| Competition | List A |
|---|---|
| Matches | 3 |
| Runs scored | 8 |
| Batting average | 4.00 |
| 100s/50s | 0/0 |
| Top score | 8 |
| Balls bowled | 102 |
| Wickets | 3 |
| Bowling average | 33.66 |
| 5 wickets in innings | 0 |
| 10 wickets in match | 0 |
| Best bowling | 2/46 |
| Catches/stumpings | 3/– |
- Source: CricketArchive, 22 April 2011

Perry John Rendell (born 20 January 1970) is a former English cricketer who played three List A cricket matches in 1990 and 1991. He was a right-handed batsman and a right-arm medium pace bowler. He made his debut for Somerset, playing against the touring Sri Lankans in 1990, and then appeared twice for the Combined Universities in the 1991 Benson & Hedges Cup.
