= Jonathan Varey =

English cricketer

Personal information
- Full name: Jonathan Guy Varey
- Born: 15 October 1961 (age 65); Darlington, County Durham, England
- Batting: Right-handed
- Bowling: Right-arm medium
- Relatives: David Varey (twin brother)

Domestic team information
- Years: Team
- 1982: Cheshire
- 1982–1983: Combined Universities
- 1982–1983: Oxford University

Career statistics
Competition	First-class	List A
Matches	13	6
Runs scored	426	125
Batting average	30.42	31.25
100s/50s	–/2	–/–
Top score	69*	35*
Balls bowled	1,254	336
Wickets	6	8
Bowling average	144.33	33.00
5 wickets in innings	0	–
10 wickets in match	0	–
Best bowling	3/69	2/44
Catches/stumpings	3/–	1/–
- Source: Cricinfo, 13 October 2018

Jonathan Guy Varey (born 15 October 1961) is a former English first-class cricketer.

Varey was born at Darlington in County Durham. He later attended St Edmund Hall, Oxford, where he made his debut in first-class cricket for Oxford University in 1982 against Northamptonshire at Oxford. He played first-class cricket for the university until 1983, making thirteen appearances. He scored 426 runs in first-class cricket, averaging 30.42, with a highest score of 69 not out; bowling he took just 6 wickets from 209 overs bowled. While studying at Oxford, Varey was also selected to play one-day cricket for the Combined Universities, making his List A debut against Somerset at Taunton in the 1982 Benson & Hedges Cup. He played List A cricket for the Combined Universities until 1983, making a total of six appearances in the Benson & Hedges Cup. In List A matches he scored 125 runs, with a top score of 35 not out; meanwhile, with the ball he took eight wickets at 33 apiece. He played one minor counties match for Cheshire in the 1982 Minor Counties Championship. His twin brother, David Varey, also played first-class cricket.
