= Nicholas Cooper =

English cricketer and geology teacher

Personal information
- Full name: Nicholas Henry Charles Cooper
- Born: 14 October 1953 (age 73); Bristol, England
- Batting: Left-handed
- Bowling: Right-arm off break

Domestic team information
- Years: Team
- 1979: Cambridge University
- 1975–1978: Gloucestershire

Career statistics
Competition	First-class	List A
Matches	24	9
Runs scored	825	85
Batting average	22.29	9.44
100s/50s	1/3	–/–
Top score	106	37
Balls bowled	510	228
Wickets	7	2
Bowling average	39.57	77.00
5 wickets in innings	–	–
10 wickets in match	–	–
Best bowling	2/11	1/39
Catches/stumpings	10/–	–/–
- Source: Cricinfo, 13 October 2011

Nicholas Henry Charles Cooper (born 14 October 1953) is a former English cricketer and geology teacher. Cooper was a left-handed batsman who bowled right-arm off break. He was born in Bristol. Until 2025, he worked at Westcliff High School for Boys.

Cooper made his first-class debut for Gloucestershire against Yorkshire in the 1975 County Championship. He made sixteen further first-class appearances for the county, the last of which came against Worcestershire in the 1978 County Championship. In his seventeen first-class matches for the county, he scored 561 runs at an average of 18.80, with a high score of 106. His only century came against Oxford University in 1976. He made his List A debut for the county against Essex in the 1975 John Player League. He made four further List A appearances for Gloucestershire, the last of which came against Minor Counties West. He struggled in limited-overs matches for the county, scoring just 27 runs at an average of 5.40, with a high score of 12.

In 1979 he undertook studies at the University of Cambridge, while there he played first-class cricket for Cambridge University Cricket Club, making his debut against Leicestershire. He made six further first-class appearances for the university in that season, the last of which came against Oxford University. In his seven first-class appearances for the university, he scored 264 runs at an average of 37.71, with a highest score of 54. He also took 6 wickets for the university, which came at a bowling average of 36.00, with best figures of 2/11. He also played List A cricket for the Combined Universities in the 1979 Benson & Hedges Cup, making four appearances. Again he struggled in the limited-overs format, scoring 58 runs at an average of 14.50, with a highest score of 37. He did though take his only wickets in that format for the Combined Universities. After leaving first class cricket Cooper played for many years at Westcliff Cricket Club, Where he was a key part in one of the best sides in the club's illustrious history.

Cooper retired from teaching geology at Westcliff High School for Boys at the end of the 2024/25 academic year, where he had worked for over 40 years.
