= Treherne Parker =

English cricketer (born 1968)

Personal information
- Full name: Treherne Edward Parker
- Born: 4 October 1968 (age 58); Chelmsford, Essex, England
- Batting: Right-handed
- Bowling: Right-arm medium

Domestic team information
- Years: Team
- 1995–1996: Suffolk

Career statistics
| Competition | List A |
|---|---|
| Matches | 1 |
| Runs scored | 0 |
| Batting average | 0.00 |
| 100s/50s | –/– |
| Top score | 0 |
| Balls bowled | 24 |
| Wickets | 0 |
| Bowling average | – |
| 5 wickets in innings | – |
| 10 wickets in match | – |
| Best bowling | – |
| Catches/stumpings | –/– |
- Source: Cricinfo, 11 July 2019

Treherne Edward Parker (born 4 October 1968) is an English former cricketer.

Parker made a single List A one-day appearance for the Combined Universities cricket team in their first match of the 1989 Benson & Hedges Cup against Surrey at Fenner's. He was dismissed without scoring in the Combined Universities innings by Mark Feltham, while in Surrey's innings he bowled four wicketless overs which conceded 30 runs. He did not feature for the team in the remainder of the competition, with the Combined Universities progressing to the quarter-finals. He later played minor counties cricket for Suffolk in 1995 and 1996, making ten appearances in the Minor Counties Championship and a single appearance in the MCCA Knockout Trophy.
