= Gregory Marie =

Australian cricketer

Personal information
- Full name: Gregory Vincent Marie
- Born: 17 February 1945 (age 81); Subiaco, Western Australia
- Batting: Right-handed
- Bowling: Right-arm medium

Domestic team information
- Years: Team
- 1978–1979: Oxford University

Career statistics
Competition	First-class	List A
Matches	10	5
Runs scored	104	18
Batting average	9.45	9.00
100s/50s	0/0	0/0
Top score	27	7*
Balls bowled	1,536	288
Wickets	21	4
Bowling average	32.00	41.25
5 wickets in innings	1	0
10 wickets in match	0	0
Best bowling	5/46	2/39
Catches/stumpings	1/–	0/–
- Source: Cricinfo, 1 September 2019

Gregory Vincent Marie (born 17 February 1945) is an Australian former cricketer.

Marie was born in the Perth suburb of Subiaco in February 1945. He studied at the University of Western Australia, before undertaking his post-graduate studies in England at Wolfson College, Oxford. While studying at Oxford, he made his debut in first-class cricket for Oxford University against Somerset at Oxford in 1978. He played first-class cricket for Oxford until 1979, making ten appearances. Playing as a right-arm medium pace bowler, took 21 wickets at an average of 32.00, with best figures of 5 for 46. These figures, which was his only first-class five wicket haul, came against Glamorgan in 1978. In addition to playing first-class cricket while at Oxford, he also made five List A one-day appearances for the Combined Universities cricket team, making three appearances in the 1978 Benson & Hedges Cup and two appearances in the 1979 Benson & Hedges Cup.
