= Roger Edbrooke =

English cricketer (born 1960)

Personal information
- Full name: Roger Michael Edbrooke
- Born: 30 December 1960 (age 65); Bristol, England
- Batting: Right-handed

Domestic team information
- Years: Team
- 1982–1984: Oxford University

Career statistics
Competition	First-class	List A
Matches	11	4
Runs scored	591	25
Batting average	32.83	6.25
100s/50s	–/4	–/–
Top score	84*	11
Catches/stumpings	5/–	–/–
- Source: Cricinfo, 30 August 2019

Roger Michael Edbrooke (born 30 December 1960) is an English former cricketer.

Edbrooke was born at Bristol in December 1960, and later went up to Hertford College, Oxford. While studying at Oxford, he made his debut in first-class cricket for Oxford University against Glamorgan at Swansea in 1982. He played first-class cricket for Oxford until 1984, making eleven appearances. He scored a total of 591 runs in his eleven matches at an average of 32.83, with a high score of 84 not out, which was one of four half centuries he made. In addition to playing first-class cricket while at Oxford, Edbrooke also appeared in four List A one-day matches for the Combined Universities cricket team in the 1984 Benson & Hedges Cup.
