= Patrick Trimby =

English cricketer

Personal information
- Full name: Patrick William Trimby
- Born: 31 January 1972 (age 54); Shrewsbury, Shropshire, England
- Batting: Left-handed
- Bowling: Leg break

Domestic team information
- Years: Team
- 1992–1995: Shropshire
- 1993–1994: Oxford University

Career statistics
Competition	First-class
Matches	13
Runs scored	31
Batting average	6.20
100s/50s	–/–
Top score	11
Balls bowled	2,471
Wickets	38
Bowling average	35.34
5 wickets in innings	1
10 wickets in match	–
Best bowling	5/84
Catches/stumpings	7/–
- Source: Cricinfo, 10 July 2019

Patrick William Trimby (born 31 January 1972) is an English former first-class cricketer.

== Early life and education ==
Trimby was born at Shrewsbury in January 1972. He was educated at Shrewsbury School, before going up to Worcester College, Oxford.

== Career ==
Trimby made his debut in first-class cricket for Oxford University against Northamptonshire at Oxford in 1993.

He played first-class cricket for Oxford until 1994, making a total of eleven first-class appearances. Playing as a leg break bowler, he took 31 wickets at an average of 35.16, with best figures of 5 for 84. These figures, which was his only first-class five wicket haul, came against Durham in 1994.

He also made two first-class appearances for the Combined Universities cricket team while at Oxford, playing against the touring New Zealanders in 1994, and the touring West Indians in 1995. Against the New Zealanders, he took 7 wickets in the match, placing him above the entire England attack, bar Phillip DeFreitas, in the Third Test between England v New Zealand at Old Trafford.

In addition to playing first-class cricket, Trimby also played minor counties cricket for Shropshire between 1992–95, making five appearances in the Minor Counties Championship and a single appearance in the MCCA Knockout Trophy.
