= Ian Curtis (cricketer) =

English cricketer

Personal information
- Full name: Ian James Curtis
- Born: 13 May 1959 (age 67); Purley, Surrey, England
- Batting: Left-handed
- Bowling: Slow left-arm orthodox

Domestic team information
- Years: Team
- 1985–2000: Oxfordshire
- 1983–1984: Surrey
- 1980–1982: Combined Universities
- 1980–1982: Oxford University

Career statistics
Competition	First-class	List A
Matches	31	23
Runs scored	77	20
Batting average	4.81	20.00
100s/50s	–/–	–/–
Top score	20*	12*
Balls bowled	4,795	1,037
Wickets	51	10
Bowling average	41.35	65.80
5 wickets in innings	2	–
10 wickets in match	–	–
Best bowling	6/28	2/53
Catches/stumpings	7/–	2/–
- Source: Cricinfo, 9 August 2011

Ian James Curtis (born 13 May 1959) is a former English cricketer. Curtis was a left-handed batsman who bowled slow left-arm orthodox. He was born in Purley, Surrey.

Curtis made his first-class debut for Oxford University against Somerset in 1980. He made 16 further first-class appearances for the university, the last of which came against Cambridge University in 1982. A bowler, Curtis took 33 wickets at an average of 41.90, with best figures of 5/140. These figures, his only five wicket haul for the university, came against Glamorgan in 1982. While studying at Oxford, he made his List A debut for Combined Universities against Northamptonshire in the 1980 Benson & Hedges Cup. He made 6 further List A appearances for the team, the last of which came against Glamorgan in the 1982 Benson & Hedges Cup. In his 7 List A matches for the team, he took just 3 wickets at an average of 60.33, with best figures of 1/18.

After completing his studies he joined Surrey, making his first-class debut for the county against Leicestershire in the 1983 County Championship. He made 13 further first-class appearances for Surrey, the last of which came against Sussex in the 1984 County Championship. In his 14 first-class matches for the county, he took 18 wickets at an average of 40.33, with best figures of 6/28. These figures, his only five wicket haul for Surrey, came against Oxford University in 1983 at The Oval. His first List A appearance for Surrey came against the touring New Zealanders in 1983. He made 5 further List A appearances for Surrey, the last of which came against Leicestershire in the 1983 John Player Special League. In his 6 limited-overs matches, he took just 2 wickets, which came at an expensive average of 60.50. He left Surrey at the end of the 1984 season.

Curtis joined Oxfordshire in 1985, making his debut for the county against Wiltshire in the Minor Counties Championship. He played Minor counties cricket for Oxfordshire from 1985 to 2000, making 119 Minor Counties Championship appearances and 15 MCCA Knockout Trophy appearances. He made his List A debut for Oxfordshire against Worcestershire in the 1986 NatWest Trophy. He made nine further List A appearances for Oxfordshire, the last of which came against Lancashire in the 2000 NatWest Trophy. In his 10 List A matches for Oxfordshire, he took 5 wickets at an average of 71.20, with best figures of 2/53.
