= Kevin Jarvis (cricketer) =

English cricketer

Personal information
- Full name: Kevin Bertram Sidney Jarvis
- Born: 23 April 1953 (age 73); Dartford, Kent
- Batting: Right-handed
- Bowling: Right arm fast-medium
- Role: Bowler

Domestic team information
- Years: Team
- 1975–1987: Kent
- 1988–1990: Gloucestershire
- 1995: Herefordshire

Career statistics
Competition	First-class	List A
Matches	260	262
Runs scored	403	118
Batting average	3.59	3.02
100s/50s	0/0	0/0
Top score	32	11
Balls bowled	37,954	12,252
Wickets	674	344
Bowling average	29.67	23.52
5 wickets in innings	20	2
10 wickets in match	3	0
Best bowling	8/97	5/24
Catches/stumpings	59/–	41/–
- Source: Cricinfo, 7 January 2010

Kevin Bertram Sidney Jarvis (born 23 April 1953) is a former English cricketer, who played first-class cricket for Kent and Gloucestershire. He was an out-and-out bowler and poor batsman who almost always batted at number 11.

Jarvis was born at Dartford in Kent. He played a number of games for Kent's Second XI in 1974, and in early June 1975 appeared in a minor warm-up match for the 1975 Cricket World Cup against the Pakistanis in which he took the wickets of Sadiq Mohammad and Zaheer Abbas. However, his first team debut was a few days later when he appeared in a John Player League match against Hampshire; he took the wicket of John Rice. A few days later still, he made his first-class début against Worcestershire, taking the single wicket of Basil D'Oliveira.

Jarvis finished 1975 with 40 first-class wickets at 29.65 and 118 List A wickets at 20.63. The following season he did slightly worse in first-class cricket, but rather better in the first-class game; he did, however, take 4/34 as Kent beat Worcestershire in the Benson & Hedges Cup final. 1977 saw Kent share the County Championship with Middlesex, and Jarvis win his county cap. He also claimed five wickets in a first-class innings for the first time, something he managed on three occasions that summer, including 7/58 against Northamptonshire. He also played in another B&H Cup final – though Kent lost this one to Gloucestershire. That winter he was selected to accompany DH Robins' side to Sri Lanka.

1978 was a good year for him, as Kent won the Championship outright, and Jarvis himself picked up 80 first-class wickets at a little over 23 runs apiece, including what proved to be his career best of 8/97 against Worcestershire in August. He also appeared in his third successive B&H Cup final, taking 2/19 as Kent beat Derbyshire. In August he was selected for Young England against the New Zealanders at Leicester, but had no success in his 19 overs. Jarvis's 1979 season, however, was not so successful as he failed to reach 40 first-class wickets.

He had a somewhat nondescript 1980, but in 1981 he managed 81 first-class wickets, including five five-wicket hauls, as well as 34 one-day dismissals (averaging under 17): both career best aggregates, in the former case outright and in the latter case equal with the following season. In 1982 Jarvis came close to making a Test debut for England at Manchester against India, being on stand by for the injured Paul Allott before England instead decided to pick an extra spinner, Geoff Miller. 1982 also saw Jarvis appear for England B against the Pakistanis at Leicester, dismissing Mudassar Nazar and Majid Khan, and in late September he went to Jamaica and played for an International XI against a West Indies XI at Kingston; this was the game in which Eddie Hemmings took 10-175, the most expensive ten-wicket haul in first-class cricket.

Jarvis had rather an unsuccessful season in taking only 30 wickets at over 52 in first-class cricket during 1983, but improved greatly the following year to claim 72 scalps at under 25. The 1984 season also saw him take 3–47 in the NatWest Trophy final against Middlesex, although Kent lost the game by four wickets. In 1985 he had his last really successful season for Kent, passing 50 first-class wickets for the final time as well as taking a one-day career best 5–24 against Nottinghamshire in June. He continued to play for Kent for two more seasons, but was no longer an automatic choice and he left for Gloucestershire at the end of 1987.

In 1988, Jarvis was used predominantly as a one-day player by his new county, appearing in 15 List A games – 14 in the Refuge Assurance League and one in the Refuge Assurance Cup — but only three first-class matches. Indeed, he claimed only a single first-class wicket that season. 1989, though, provided more balance as he played 13 first-class and 15 one-day games, and provided his best performances for Gloucestershire: he took 5–15 against Glamorgan in the County Championship and 5–32 against Oxfordshire in the NatWest Trophy. He also passed 20 with the bat for the only time in first-team cricket, hitting 32 against Hampshire in July.

Jarvis played a few more times for Gloucestershire in 1990 but had little success, though he was selected for MCC in a one-day game against the New Zealanders in early May. However, over the season as a whole he averaged well over 40 in both forms of the game, and left the county after that season. Later, he joined Herefordshire to play minor counties cricket. This brought him one final List A appearance, in the 1995 NatWest Trophy against Durham; although Herefordshire were crushed by 207 runs, he dismissed two Test cricketers in John Morris and Manoj Prabhakar. Jarvis also appeared in that year's MCC Trophy final, but took only one wicket as Herefordshire lost by two wickets to Cambridgeshire.
