= David Littlewood =

English cricketer

Personal information
- Full name: David John Littlewood
- Born: 28 October 1955 (age 71); Holloway, Middlesex, England
- Batting: Right-handed
- Role: Wicket-keeper

Domestic team information
- Years: Team
- 1977–1978: Cambridge University

Career statistics
Competition	First-class	List A
Matches	10	2
Runs scored	95	3
Batting average	13.57	3.00
100s/50s	–/1	–/–
Top score	51	3*
Catches/stumpings	12/6	–/–
- Source: Cricinfo, 30 August 2019

David John Littlewood (born 25 October 1955) is an English former cricketer.

Littlewood was born at Holloway in October 1955, and later went up to St John's College, Cambridge. While studying at Cambridge, he made his debut in first-class cricket for Cambridge University against Glamorgan at Fenner's in 1977. He played first-class cricket for Oxford until 1978, making ten appearances. Playing as a wicket-keeper, he scored 95 runs at an average of 13.57, with a high score of 51. Behind the stumps he took 12 catches and made 6 stumpings. In addition to playing first-class cricket while at Cambridge, Littlewood also appeared in two List A one-day matches for the Combined Universities cricket team in the 1978 Benson & Hedges Cup.
