= Steven Sylvester =

English cricketer (born 1968)

Personal information
- Full name: Steven Antony Sylvester
- Born: 26 September 1968 (age 58); Chalfont St Giles, Buckinghamshire, England
- Nickname: Sylvers
- Batting: Right-handed
- Bowling: Left-arm fast-medium
- Role: Left arm bowler

Domestic team information
- Years: Team
- 1997–2000: Hertfordshire
- 1993–1994: Nottinghamshire
- 1991–1996: Buckinghamshire
- 1991–1992: Middlesex

Career statistics
Competition	First-class	List A
Matches	6	7
Runs scored	6	1
Batting average	6.00	0.50
100s/50s	–/–	–/–
Top score	6*	1*
Balls bowled	756	330
Wickets	5	4
Bowling average	75.40	60.00
5 wickets in innings	–	–
10 wickets in match	–	–
Best bowling	2/34	2/31
Catches/stumpings	2/–	3/–
- Source: Cricinfo, 14 July 2011

Steven Antony Sylvester (born 26 September 1968) is an English former cricketer and is now a Chartered Psychologist and Associate Fellow of the British Psychological Society (BPS). Sylvester was a right-handed batsman who bowled left-arm fast-medium. He was born in Chalfont St Giles, Buckinghamshire. Sylvester also played Academy Football for Oxford United in the early 1980s, and played against Chelsea U18s at Stanford Bridge in the Youth FA Cup under the guidance of Maurice Evans and Dave Fogg.

== Cricket career ==
Sylvester made his first-class debut for Middlesex against Glamorgan in the 1991 County Championship. He made 4 further first-class appearances for the county, the last of which came against the touring Pakistanis in 1992. In his 5 first-class matches, he took 4 wickets at an average of 80.00, with best figures of 2/34. He made his List A debut for Middlesex against Minor Counties in the 1992 Benson & Hedges Cup. He made a further List A appearance for Middlesex, against Surrey in the same competition. He took a single wicket in these matches, at a cost of 83 runs.

In the season he made his debut for Middlesex, he also made his debut for Buckinghamshire in the Minor Counties Championship against Cheshire. In 1993, he made a single List A appearance for Nottinghamshire against Lancashire in the 1993 AXA Equity & Law League. The following season, he appeared in a single first-class match for Nottinghamshire against Oxford University. In this match, he scored 6 unbeaten runs in Nottinghamshire's first-innings, while in their second-innings he wasn't required to bat. With the ball, he took the wicket of Greg Macmillan in the Oxford first-innings for the cost 38 runs from 17 overs, while in their second-innings he bowled 5 wicket-less overs for the cost of 19 runs. He continued to play Minor counties cricket for Buckinghamshire, before leaving the county at the end of the 1996 season, having made 6 Minor Counties Championship and 2 MCCA Knockout Trophy appearances.

He joined Hertfordshire in 1997, making his debut for the county in the MCCA Knockout Trophy against Lincolnshire. He played Minor counties cricket for Hertfordshire from 1997 to 1999, playing 11 Minor Counties Championship matches and 4 MCCA Knockout Trophy matches. He first appeared in List A cricket for Hertfordshire against the Leicestershire Cricket Board in the 1999 NatWest Trophy. He made 3 further List A appearances for the county, the last of which came against Cambridgeshire in the 2000 NatWest Trophy. In his 4 matches, he took 3 wickets at an average of 46.00, with best figures of 2/31.

== Psychology career ==
He retired from professional cricket in 1994. Master's degree in psychology, a Chartered Psychologist (CPsychol.) with the British Psychological Society (BPS). He has now achieved the status of Associate Fellow (AFBPsS) within the British Psychological Society (BPS) for his contribution to psychology. He is also a Registered Practitioner Psychologist with the Health & Care Professions Council (HCPC). Sylvester is a published Author with his first book Detox Your Ego published by Headline Publishing Group in 2016. Sylvester is currently writing his second book that will be released as part of a series.
