= Jeremy Hallett =

English cricketer

Jeremy Charles Hallett (born 18 October 1970) is an English former cricketer. He played first-class and List A cricket for Somerset between 1990 and 1995 and for the Combined Universities cricket team between 1991 and 1994.

Hallett retired through injury in 1996 and then studied business and marketing as a postgraduate at Durham University. He was born at Yeovil, Somerset.
