= Simon Renshaw =

English cricketer (born 1974)

Personal information
- Full name: Simon John Renshaw
- Born: 6 March 1974 (age 52); Bebington, Cheshire, England
- Batting: Right-handed
- Bowling: Right-arm medium-fast

Domestic team information
- Years: Team
- 1994–1995: Cheshire
- 1996–2000: Hampshire
- 2001–2004: Cheshire
- 2005: Staffordshire

Career statistics
Competition	First-class	List A
Matches	39	60
Runs scored	459	233
Batting average	16.39	12.26
100s/50s	–/1	–/–
Top score	56	27*
Balls bowled	6,504	2,694
Wickets	93	77
Bowling average	38.49	28.57
5 wickets in innings	1	1
10 wickets in match	–	–
Best bowling	5/110	6/25
Catches/stumpings	14/–	7/–
- Source: Cricinfo, 8 December 2009

Simon John Renshaw (born 6 March 1974) is an English former cricketer. He played cricket at first-class and List A level as a bowler predominantly for Hampshire. He also played at minor counties level for Cheshire and Staffordshire, and toward the latter part of his minor counties career, he was considered an all-rounder.

== Cricket career ==
=== Early cricket career ===
Renshaw was born in March 1974 in Bebington, Cheshire. Renshaw began playing club cricket for Oxton, and later attended the University of Leeds, where he came to the attention of Yorkshire. He made his debut in minor counties cricket for Cheshire against Devon in the 1994 Minor Counties Championship, with Renshaw making eight appearances for Cheshire that season in the Minor Counties Championship, alongside making his debut in List A one-day cricket against Durham at Bowdon in the first round of the 1994 NatWest Trophy. Whilst attending the University of Leeds, Renshaw was selected to represent the Combined Universities cricket team in 1995, making his debut in first-class cricket for the team against the touring West Indians at Oxford, with Brian Lara scoring five fours from one of Renshaw's overs. He also made five appearances for the Combined Universities in the Benson & Hedges Cup.

=== Hampshire ===
Renshaw was signed by Hampshire ahead of the 1996 season, making his Hampshire debut in a first-class match against Cambridge University at Fenner's in 1996. In his debut season, he also made six appearances in the County Championship, taking 15 first-class wickets at an average of 49.53 in his debut season. He also made five one-day appearances for Hampshire in the 1996 Axa Equity & Law League, having played for Cheshire earlier in the season against Northamptonshire in the first round of the NatWest Trophy. The following season, he made thirteen first-class appearances, taking 37 wickets at an average of 34.54; during the season he took his only career five wicket haul in first-class cricket, with figures of 5 for 110 against Derbyshire. His 25 one-appearances in 1997 yielded him 37 wickets at an average of 25.70, with Renshaw taking his only one-day five wicket haul with 6 for 25 against Surrey at Southampton; as of 2026, he is one of only nine Hampshire players to have taken six wickets or more in a limited-overs fixture. His performances in 1997 saw him named the NBC Denis Compton Award recipient for Hampshire.

Peter Hartley's arrival in 1998 saw Renshaw's opportunities that season restricted to just two first-class and three one-day matches. With the retirement of Cardigan Connor following the 1998 season, Renshaw found increased opportunities during the 1999 season. His twelve first-class appearances that season saw him take 30 wickets at an average of 37.50, whilst in one-day cricket he took 13 wickets from thirteen matches. With the signing of fast bowler Alan Mullally from Leicestershire for the 2000 season, Renshaw once again found his first team opportunities limited. That season he was limited to just four first-class and three one-day appearances, however he did captain the Hampshire Second XI in the first-ever match played on Hampshire's new home, the Rose Bowl. He was released by Hampshire at the end of that season, alongside the retiring Hartley and Lee Savident. For Hampshire he played as a right-arm medium-fast bowler, taking 91 wickets in 38 matches at an average of 37.24. In 49 one-day matches, he took 62 wickets at an average of 28.02. A tailend batsman, he made one half century for Hampshire, which came in a first-class match.

=== Return to minor counties cricket ===
Renshaw returned to play minor counties cricket for Cheshire in 2001, making five appearances in that season's Minor Counties Championship and one appearance in the MCCA Knockout Trophy; additionally during his first season back at Cheshire, he made a single List A one-day match against Cornwall at Camborne in the second round of the 2001 Cheltenham & Gloucester Trophy. He played for Cheshire until the end of the 2004 season, and was a regular member of their team in the Minor Counties Championship. He also played two further List A one-day matches, against Bedfordshire in the first round of the 2004 Cheltenham & Gloucester Trophy (played in August 2003) and against Hampshire in the second round, which was played in May 2004. In stark contrast to his first-class career, Renshaw's second-spell with Cheshire saw him excel as a batsman, particularly in 2002, when he scored 340 runs from seven innings, at a batting average of 56.66. Overall for Cheshire he made 28 appearances in the Minor Counties Championship, scoring 1,035 runs at a batting average of 32.34, with one century. With the ball, he took 80 wickets at an average of 28.78, claiming five wickets in an innings on four occasions and ten-wickets in a match once.

Renshaw left Cheshire following the 2004 season to join Staffordshire, for whom he played one season for in 2005. There he played three Minor Counties Championship and two MCCA Knockout Trophy matches, alongside playing against Surrey Leek in the first round of the 2005 Cheltenham & Gloucester Trophy, in what was his final appearance in List A one-day cricket. Renshaw lived in Leicestershire, where he was a full-time sales manager. There he played club cricket for Kibworth in the Leicestershire Cricket League.
