= Robert Macdonald (South African cricketer) =

South African cricketer

Personal information
- Full name: Robert Hepburn Macdonald
- Born: 18 July 1965 (age 61); Cape Town, Cape Province, South Africa
- Batting: Right-handed
- Bowling: Right-arm medium-fast

Domestic team information
- Years: Team
- 1991–1993: Oxford University

Career statistics
Competition	First-class	List A
Matches	20	5
Runs scored	76	18
Batting average	9.60	18.00
100s/50s	–/–	–/–
Top score	20	12*
Balls bowled	2,920	264
Wickets	35	9
Bowling average	38.71	26.22
5 wickets in innings	1	1
10 wickets in match	–	–
Best bowling	5/20	6/36
Catches/stumpings	–/–	–/–
- Source: Cricinfo, 1 September 2019

Robert Hepburn Macdonald (born 18 July 1965) is a South African former cricketer.

Macdonald was born in Cape Town on the 18th of July 1965. He studied in England at Durham University, before undertaking his post-graduate studies at Keble College, Oxford. While studying at Oxford, he made his debut in first-class cricket for Oxford University against Hampshire at Oxford in 1991. He played first-class cricket for Oxford until 1993, making a total of nineteen first-class appearances. Playing as a right-arm medium-fast bowler, he took 31 wickets at an average of 38.93, with best figures of 5 for 20. These figures, which was his only first-class five wicket haul, came against Middlesex in 1993. He also made a single first-class appearance for the Combined Universities cricket team against the touring Australians. In addition to playing first-class cricket while at Oxford, he also made three List A one-day appearances for the Combined Universities, making four appearances in the 1991 Benson & Hedges Cup and a single appearance in the 1993 Benson & Hedges Cup. taking 9 wickets at an average of 26.22. His best figures of 6 for 36 came against Gloucestershire on his List A debut. He took no more than a single wicket in his other five List A matches.
