= David Russell (cricketer, born 1951) =

English cricketer

Personal information
- Full name: David Paul Russell
- Born: 4 June 1951 (age 75); St Helens, Lancashire, England
- Batting: Right-handed
- Bowling: Right-arm medium

Domestic team information
- Years: Team
- 1974–1975: Cambridge University
- 1976: Cambridgeshire

Career statistics
Competition	First-class	List A
Matches	16	8
Runs scored	514	45
Batting average	19.76	7.50
100s/50s	–/2	–/–
Top score	56*	13
Balls bowled	1,769	414
Wickets	16	6
Bowling average	59.50	40.00
5 wickets in innings	–	–
10 wickets in match	–	–
Best bowling	3/60	2/27
Catches/stumpings	7/–	1/–
- Source: Cricinfo, 21 July 2019

David Paul Russell (born 4 June 1951) is an English former first-class cricketer.

While studying at the University of Cambridge, Russell made his debut in first-class cricket for Cambridge University against Leicestershire at Fenner's in 1974. He played first-class cricket for Cambridge until 1975, making sixteen appearances. He scored 514 runs at an average of 19.76 in his sixteen matches, with a high score of 56 not out. With his right-arm medium pace bowling, he took 16 wickets at a bowling average of 59.50, with best figures of 3 for 60. While at Cambridge, Russell also played List A one-day cricket, making four appearances for Cambridge University in the 1974 Benson & Hedges Cup and four appearances for the Combined Universities in the 1975 Benson & Hedges Cup. He scored 45 runs in these eight matches, as well as taking 6 wickets. In addition to playing first-class and List A cricket, Russell also played minor counties cricket for Cambridgeshire in 1976, making a single appearance in the Minor Counties Championship.
