= Mark Cullinan =

South African former cricketer

Personal information
- Full name: Mark Ronald Cullinan
- Born: 3 April 1957 (age 69); Johannesburg, Transvaal, South Africa
- Batting: Right-handed
- Role: Wicket-keeper

Domestic team information
- Years: Team
- 1983–1984: Oxford University

Career statistics
Competition	First-class	List A
Matches	16	2
Runs scored	215	8
Batting average	11.31	4.00
100s/50s	–/2	–/–
Top score	59	8
Balls bowled	12	0
Wickets	1	–
Bowling average	4.00	–
5 wickets in innings	–	–
10 wickets in match	–	–
Best bowling	1/4	–
Catches/stumpings	18/1	3/–
- Source: Cricinfo, 1 September 2019

Mark Ronald Cullinan (born 3 April 1957) is a South African former cricketer.

Cullinan was born at Johannesburg in April 1957 and educated at Hilton College. He studied at university in South Africa, making his debut in first-class cricket for a combined South African Universities cricket team against Transvaal at Johannesburg in 1979.

== Career ==
He later before undertook his post-graduate studies in England at Worcester College, Oxford. He played first-class cricket while studying in England for Oxford University, debuting for the university against Lancashire at Oxford in 1983.

He played first-class cricket for Oxford until 1984, making a total of fifteen appearances. He scored a total of 210 runs in his fifteen matches for Oxford, with an average of 11.66 and a high score of 59.

In addition to playing first-class cricket while at Oxford, he also made two List A one-day appearances for the Combined Universities cricket team in the 1983 Benson & Hedges Cup. He later became a diamond dealer and currently resides in Monaco.
