= Russell Cake =

English cricketer

Personal information
- Born: May 16, 1973 (age 53)
- Batting: Right-handed
- Bowling: Leg-break

Career statistics
Competition	First-class	List A
Matches	37	5
Runs scored	2,055	111
Batting average	38.05	22.20
100s/50s	4/9	0/0
Top score	108	28
Catches/stumpings	16/–	2/–
- Source: Cricinfo, 8 November 2022

Russell Quentin Cake (born 16 May 1973) is a former English first-class cricketer who played regularly for Cambridge University in the mid-1990s.

He was born in Chertsey, Surrey and attended King's College School, Wimbledon, where he captained the First XI.

After going up to St John's College, Cambridge, Cake made his first-class debut, for a Cambridge team captained by future England Test cricketer John Crawley, against Derbyshire in April 1993, scoring 1 and 10 not out. A few days later against Yorkshire he scored 29* and 25*, and two further half-centuries had followed by the end of May. In June he was selected for Combined Universities' first-ever first-class match against a touring side, and hit a career-best 108 against the Australians.

Having finished 1993 with a batting average of 36, Cake remained a regular selection for Cambridge in 1994. He was again picked for Combined Universities' tour game, but could manage only 3 and 0 against the New Zealanders. He did hit 107 and 66 against Glamorgan, and several other useful knocks saw him spend the second half of the season playing for Surrey's Second XI, but despite scoring 100 against Warwickshire II he never managed to break into the county's first team.

Cake returned to playing exclusively university cricket for 1995, and though he appeared only seven times he nevertheless scored over 500 first-class runs at an average in excess of 46, including 101 and 43 in a losing cause against Oxford University at Lord's. He played a further eight games for Cambridge (and one for British Universities) in 1996, all of them as captain, making 102* against Derbyshire, and made his only List A appearances when he played five times for British Universities in the Benson & Hedges Cup with little success.

After his first-class cricket career, Cake played in the Lancashire League for Chorley Cricket Club.
