= Stuart Gardiner =

South African cricketer

Personal information
- Full name: Stuart James Gardiner
- Born: 19 March 1947 (age 79); Blomfontein, Orange Free State, South Africa
- Batting: Left-handed
- Bowling: Left-arm medium

Domestic team information
- Years: Team
- 1967/68–1973/74: Orange Free State
- 1974/75: Northern Transvaal
- 1978: Cambridge University

Career statistics
Competition	First-class	List A
Matches	34	8
Runs scored	556	21
Batting average	16.84	4.20
100s/50s	–/–	–/–
Top score	40*	7*
Balls bowled	5,863	432
Wickets	111	8
Bowling average	24.97	38.37
5 wickets in innings	5	–
10 wickets in match	–	–
Best bowling	6/49	3/62
Catches/stumpings	13/–	2/–
- Source: Cricinfo, 6 September 2019

Stuart James Gardiner (born 19 March 1947) is a South African former cricketer.

Gardiner was born at Blomfontein in March 1947. He made his debut in first-class cricket for Orange Free State against Griqualand West at Blomfontein in the 1967–68 Currie Cup. He played first-class cricket for Orange Free State until the 1973–74 Currie Cup, making 25 appearances. Playing as a left-arm medium pace bowler, Gardiner took 98 wickets in his 25 appearances for Orange Free State, at an average of 22.84 and best figures of 6 for 49. These figures, one of five five wicket hauls he took, came against Northern Transvaal in the 1972–73 Currie Cup. As a lower-order batsman, he scored 485 runs at a batting average of 17.96 and a high score of 40 not out. Gardiner also made a single first-class appearance for a Combined Section B XI against D. H. Robins' XI in January 1973. He also played List A one-day cricket, debuting for Orange Free State against Eastern Province in the 1970–71 Gillette Cup. He made five List A appearances for Orange Free State, as well as making a single appearance for Northern Transvaal in the 1974–75 Gillette Cup.

He later studied in England at St John's College, Cambridge. While studying at Cambridge, he made eight appearances for Cambridge University in 1978, in addition to making two appearances for the Combined Universities cricket team in the 1978 Benson & Hedges Cup.
