= Ian Peck =

English cricketer and rugby union footballer

Personal information
- Full name: Ian George Peck
- Born: 18 October 1957 (age 69); Great Staughton, Cambridgeshire, England
- Batting: Right-handed
- Role: Wicket-keeper

Domestic team information
- Years: Team
- 1976–1985: Bedfordshire
- 1978–1984: Cambridge University
- 1980–1981: Combined Universities
- 1980–1981: Northamptonshire

Career statistics
Competition	First-class	List A
Matches	29	9
Runs scored	507	103
Batting average	13.34	20.60
100s/50s	0/0	0/0
Top score	49*	31
Catches/stumpings	14/1	2/0
- Source: Cricinfo, 24 September 2011

Ian George Peck (born 18 October 1957) is a former English cricketer. Peck was a right-handed batsman who fielded as a wicket-keeper. He was born in Great Staughton, Huntingdonshire, and educated at Bedford School.

Peck made his debut in county cricket for Bedfordshire in the 1976 Minor Counties Championship against Buckinghamshire. The following season he made his List A debut for the county against Northumberland in the 1977 Gillette Cup. Continuing to play Minor counties cricket for Bedfordshire, Peck later attended Magdalene College, Cambridge, making his first-class debut in 1978 for Cambridge University Cricket Club against Essex. He played first-class cricket for Cambridge University from 1978 to 1981, making 22 appearances, and captaining the university team in 1980 and 1981. During this period he also made seven List A appearances for the Combined Universities spread over the 1980 and 1981 Benson & Hedges Cups. In these matches, he scored 97 runs at an average of 32.33, with a high score of 31. During this period he also made a single first-class appearance for a combined Oxford and Cambridge Universities against the touring Sri Lankans, as well as making two first-class appearances for Northamptonshire, making an appearance each in the 1980 County Championship against Somerset and in the 1981 County Championship against Yorkshire.

In 1984, Peck undertook studies once more at Cambridge University, making four further first-class appearances for the university in that season. In total, he made 26 first-class appearance for Cambridge University, scoring 483 runs at an average of 14.20, with a high score of 49 not out. Behind the stumps he took 11 catches. He played Minor counties cricket for Bedfordshire until 1985, by which time he had made 33 Minor Counties Championship appearances and two MCCA Knockout Trophy appearances. He made a final List A appearance for Bedfordshire in the 1985 NatWest Trophy against Gloucestershire. In this match he captained Bedfordshire, scoring a single run before being dismissed by Kevin Curran, with Gloucestershire winning by 141 runs.

Peck was also a Cambridge blue at rugby union, captaining Cambridge University R.U.F.C. in the 1979 season, and came close to playing for the England national rugby union team as a member of the squad during the 1980 Five Nations Championship.

After he left Cambridge, Peck taught at his old school, Bedford School.
