= David Holliday (cricketer) =

English cricketer (born 1958)

Personal information
- Full name: David Charles Holliday
- Born: 20 December 1958 (age 67); Cambridge, Cambridgeshire, England
- Batting: Right-handed
- Bowling: Leg break

Domestic team information
- Years: Team
- 1979–1987: Cambridgeshire
- 1979: British Universities
- 1979–1981: Cambridge University

Career statistics
Competition	First-class	List A
Matches	29	2
Runs scored	552	29
Batting average	18.00	14.50
100s/50s	–/3	–/–
Top score	76*	27
Balls bowled	725	–
Wickets	6	–
Bowling average	66.66	–
5 wickets in innings	–	–
10 wickets in match	–	–
Best bowling	2/23	–
Catches/stumpings	15/–	–/–
- Source: Cricinfo, 4 September 2011

David Charles Holliday (born 20 December 1958) is a former English cricketer. Holliday was a right-handed batsman who bowled leg break. He was born in Cambridge, Cambridgeshire.

Holliday made his first-class debut for Cambridge University against Essex in 1979. He made 28 further first-class appearances for the university, the last of which came against Oxford University in 1981. In these 28 matches, he scored 522 runs at an average of 18.00, with a high score of 76 not out. This score, one of three first-class fifties he made, came against Nottinghamshire in 1980. With the ball, he took 6 wickets at a bowling average of 66.66, with best figures of 2/23. While studying at Cambridge, he made his List A debut for the Combined Universities against Surrey in the 1979 Benson & Hegdes Cup. In this match, he scored 2 runs before being dismissed by Hugh Wilson.

In the same year that he made his debut for Cambridge University, he also made his debut for Cambridgeshire in the Minor Counties Championship against Bedfordshire. He played Minor counties cricket for the county from 1979 to 1987, making eighteen Minor Counties Championship appearances and four MCCA Knockout Trophy appearances. He also made a single List A appearance for Cambridgeshire, which came in the 1983 NatWest Trophy against Middlesex. In this match, he scored 27 runs before being dismissed by John Emburey.
