= Nigel Fenton =

English cricketer (born 1965)

Personal information
- Full name: Nigel Charles Windsor Fenton
- Born: 17 November 1965 (age 60); Bradford, Yorkshire, England
- Batting: Right-handed
- Bowling: Right-arm fast-medium

Domestic team information
- Years: Team
- 1984–1985: Cambridge University

Career statistics
Competition	First-class	List A
Matches	8	4
Runs scored	11	1
Batting average	1.83	1.00
100s/50s	–/–	–/–
Top score	7*	1*
Balls bowled	1,780	240
Wickets	21	6
Bowling average	39.09	20.33
5 wickets in innings	–	–
10 wickets in match	–	–
Best bowling	4/64	3/44
Catches/stumpings	1/–	–/–
- Source: Cricinfo, 30 August 2019

Nigel Charles Windsor Fenton (born 17 November 1965) is an English former cricketer.

The son of Charles Fenton and his wife, Shirley Windsor, He was educated at Rugby School. He then studied at Durham University, where he was awarded a half-palatinate for cricket in 1987.

Fenton continued his education at Magdalene College, Cambridge. While studying at Cambridge, he made his debut in first-class cricket for Cambridge University against Derbyshire at Fenner's in 1988. He played first-class cricket for Cambridge until 1991, making ten appearances, though he did not feature for Cambridge in 1989 or 1990. Playing as a right-arm fast-medium bowler, he took 21 wickets at an average of 39.09, with best figures of 4 for 64. In addition to playing first-class cricket while at Cambridge, Fenton also appeared in four List A one-day matches for the Combined Universities cricket team in the 1988 Benson & Hedges Cup, taking 6 wickets at an average of 20.33.
