= Donald Kayum =

Guyanese cricketer

Personal information
- Full name: Donald Amrul Kayum
- Born: 13 October 1955 (age 71); Georgetown, British Guiana
- Batting: Right-handed
- Bowling: Right-arm off break

Domestic team information
- Years: Team
- 1977–1978: Oxford University

Career statistics
Competition	First-class	List A
Matches	12	1
Runs scored	423	0
Batting average	24.88	0.00
100s/50s	–/3	–/–
Top score	57	0
Catches/stumpings	8/–	–/–
- Source: Cricinfo, 1 September 2019

Donald Amrul Kayum (born 13 October 1955) is a Guyanese former cricketer.

Kayum was born in British Guiana at Georgetown. After studying at Chatham House Grammar School in Ramsgate and playing cricket for Broadstairs CC, he attended the University of Oxford in England, studying at Lincoln College. While studying at Oxford, he made his debut in first-class cricket for Oxford University against Gloucestershire at Oxford in 1977. He played first-class cricket for Oxford until 1978, making twelve appearances. Playing as a batsman, he scored 423 runs for Oxford at an average of 24.88 and a high score of 57, one of three half centuries he made. In addition to playing first-class cricket while at Oxford, he also made a single List A one-day appearance for the Combined Universities cricket team against Hampshire at Fenner's in the 1978 Benson & Hedges Cup, in which he was dismissed without scoring by Mike Taylor.
