= Paul Garlick =

English cricketer

Personal information
- Full name: Paul Lawrence Garlick
- Born: 2 August 1964 (age 62); Chiswick, Middlesex, England
- Nickname: Onions
- Batting: Right-handed
- Bowling: Right-arm fast-medium

Domestic team information
- Years: Team
- 1984–1997: Dorset
- 1984: Combined Universities
- 1984: Cambridge University

Career statistics
Competition	FC	LA
Matches	10	6
Runs scored	13	0
Batting average	1.44	0.00
100s/50s	–/–	–/–
Top score	6*	0*
Balls bowled	1,518	299
Wickets	12	5
Bowling average	91.00	33.80
5 wickets in innings	–	–
10 wickets in match	–	–
Best bowling	2/69	3/31
Catches/stumpings	1/–	–/–
- Source: Cricinfo, 5 April 2010

Paul Lawrence Garlick (born 2 August 1964) is a former English first-class cricketer. A right-handed batsman who bowled right-arm fast-medium, he made his first-class debut for Cambridge University against Leicestershire in 1984. Garlick played 10 first-class matches for the university in 1984, with his final first-class match coming against Oxford University. In his 10 first-class matches he scored 13 runs at a batting average of 1.44, with a high score of 6*. With the ball he took just 12 wickets at a bowling average of 91.00, with best figures of 2/69.

Also in 1984, he made his List-A debut for the Combined Universities against Hampshire in the 1984 Benson and Hedges Cup. Garlick made 4 List-A appearances for the Combined Universities in 1984, with his final List-A match for the team coming against Essex. Garlick took 5 wickets for the team at an average of 21.60, with best figures of 3/31.

Also coming in 1984, Garlick made his Dorset debut in the 1984 Minor Counties Championship against Cornwall. Garlick played 40 Minor Counties matches for Dorset, with his final Minor Counties match for the county coming against Devon in the 1997 Minor Counties Championship.

In 1993 he made his List-A debut for Dorset against Surrey in the 1st round of the 1993 NatWest Trophy. Garlick made one further List-A appearance for Dorset against Glamorgan in the 1995 NatWest trophy.
