= Angus MacRobert =

South African cricketer

Personal information
- Full name: Angus David MacRobert
- Born: 13 October 1968 (age 58); Pretoria, Transvaal, South Africa
- Batting: Right-handed
- Bowling: Right-arm medium-fast

Domestic team information
- Years: Team
- 1995: Oxford University

Career statistics
Competition	First-class	List A
Matches	9	3
Runs scored	80	6
Batting average	11.42	3.00
100s/50s	–/–	–/–
Top score	29	6
Balls bowled	1,584	180
Wickets	18	5
Bowling average	46.83	34.60
5 wickets in innings	–	–
10 wickets in match	–	–
Best bowling	4/41	3/51
Catches/stumpings	3/–	2/–
- Source: Cricinfo, 1 September 2019

Angus David MacRobert (born 15 October 1968) is a South African former cricketer.

MacRobert was born at Pretoria in October 1968. He studied at the University of Cape Town, before undertaking his post-graduate studies in England at Keble College, Oxford. While studying at Oxford, he made his debut in first-class cricket for Oxford University against Durham at Oxford in 1995. He made a total of nine first-class appearances for Oxford in 1995, taking 18 wickets with his right-arm medium-fast bowling at an average of 46.83, with best figures of 4 for 41. In addition to playing first-class cricket while at Oxford, he also made three List A one-day appearances for the Combined Universities cricket team in the 1995 Benson & Hedges Cup, taking 5 wickets at an average of 34.60, with best figures of 3 for 51.
