= 1976 Benson & Hedges Cup =

Fifth edition of cricket's Benson & Hedges Cup

- Administrator: Test and County Cricket Board
- Cricket format: Limited overs cricket (55 overs per innings)
- Champions: Kent (2nd title)
- Participants: 20
- Matches: 47
- Most runs: 368 Alan Ormrod (Worcestershire)
- Most wickets: 15 Mike Hendrick (Derbyshire)

The 1976 Benson & Hedges Cup was the fifth edition of cricket's Benson & Hedges Cup. The competition was won by Kent County Cricket Club. Compared with the previous year, the groups were no longer organised on a regional basis, and the minor counties were divided east–west rather than north–south.

== Fixtures and results ==
=== Group stage ===
==== Group A ====
Team	Pld	W	L	Pts	BowSR
Warwickshire	4	3	1	9	55.000
Lancashire	4	2	2	6	32.784
Derbyshire	4	2	2	6	42.258
Glamorgan	4	2	2	6	47.000
Hampshire	4	1	3	3	54.875

==== Group B ====
Team	Pld	W	L	Pts	BowSR
Leicestershire	4	3	1	9	41.258
Worcestershire	4	3	1	9	55.000
Gloucestershire	4	2	2	6	41.933
Somerset	4	2	2	6	42.750
Minor Counties West	4	0	4	0	96.727

==== Group C ====
Team	Pld	W	L	Pts	BowSR
Nottinghamshire	4	4	0	12	52.800
Essex	4	3	1	9	34.139
Northamptonshire	4	2	2	6	39.419
Middlesex	4	1	3	3	48.619
Minor Counties East	4	0	4	0	91.143

==== Group D ====
Team	Pld	W	L	Pts	BowSR
Kent	4	3	1	9	42.481
Surrey	4	3	1	9	48.444
Yorkshire	4	2	2	6	44.385
Oxford and Cambridge Universities	4	1	3	3	49.308
Sussex	4	1	3	3	66.588

=== Quarter-finals ===
9 June 1976
(scorecard)

Kent; 196 all out (54.5 overs)	v	Nottinghamshire; 166 all out (51.5 overs)
Mike Denness 50; Barry Stead 4/24 (10.5 overs)		Mike Harris 54; Kevin Jarvis 4/54 (11 overs)

Kent won by 30 runs
St Lawrence Ground, Canterbury
Umpires: Sam Cook & Ray Julian
Player of the match: Kevin Jarvis (Kent)

9 June 1976
(scorecard)

Essex; 220/9 (55 overs)	v	Surrey; 221/7 (54.5 overs)
Graham Gooch 89; Robin Jackman 3/31 (11 overs)		John Edrich 57*; Stuart Turner 2/19 (11 overs)

Surrey won by 3 wickets
The Oval, London
Umpires: David Evans & John Langridge
Player of the match: John Edrich (Surrey)

9 June 1976
(scorecard)

Lancashire; 206/9 (55 overs)	v	Warwickshire; 209/6 (54.1 overs)
Frank Hayes 70; Bob Willis 5/27 (11 overs)		John Whitehouse 71*; David Hughes 2/42 (11 overs)

Warwickshire won by 4 wickets
Edgbaston, Birmingham
Umpires: Henry Horton & Dusty Rhodes
Player of the match: Bob Willis (Warwickshire)

9 June 1976
(scorecard)

Leicestershire; 268/5 (55 overs)	v	Worcestershire; 272/4 (54.4 overs)
Roger Tolchard 92*; John Inchmore 2/53 (11 overs)		Alan Ormrod 95; Paddy Clift 2/47 (11 overs)

Worcestershire won by 6 wickets
County Ground, Worcester
Umpires: Eddie Phillipson & Peter Rochford
Player of the match: Imran Khan (Worcestershire)

=== Semi-finals ===
23 June 1976
(scorecard)

Kent; 280/3 (55 overs)	v	Surrey; 264 all out (53.2 overs)
Mike Denness 104; Graham Roope 2/59 (9 overs)		Christopher Aworth 67; Derek Underwood 5/35 (10.2 overs)

Kent won by 16 runs
The Oval, London
Umpires: Arthur Jepson & Peter Wight
Player of the match: Mike Denness (Kent)

23 June 1976
(scorecard)

Worcestershire; 281/4 (55 overs)	v	Warwickshire; 269/9 (55 overs)
Glenn Turner 143*; Bill Bourne 3/58 (11 overs)		Dennis Amiss 44; Paul Pridgeon 3/57 (11 overs)

Worcestershire won by 12 runs
Edgbaston, Birmingham
Umpires: Barrie Meyer & Ken Palmer
Player of the match: Glenn Turner (Worcestershire)

=== Final ===
17 July 1976
(scorecard)

Kent; 236/7 (55 overs)	v	Worcestershire; 193 all out (52.4 overs)
Graham Johnson 78; Norman Gifford 2/38 (11 overs)		Basil D'Oliveira 50; Kevin Jarvis 4/34 (10.4 overs)

Kent won by 43 runs
Lord's, London
Umpires: David Constant & Tom Spencer
Player of the match: Graham Johnson (Kent)
