= Roger Moulding =

English cricketer (born 1958)

Roger Moulding (born 3 January 1958) is an English former first-class cricketer active 1977–83 who played for Middlesex and Oxford University. He was born in Enfield, Middlesex.

He was educated at Haberdashers' Aske's School for Boys, Elstree.
