= Charles Cantlay =

English businessman and cricketer (born 1954)

Personal information
- Full name: Charles Peter Thrale Cantlay
- Born: 4 February 1954 (age 72); Victoria, London, England
- Batting: Right-handed
- Bowling: Right-arm fast-medium

Domestic team information
- Years: Team
- 1975: Oxford University
- 1975: Combined Universities

Career statistics
Competition	FC	List A
Matches	6	2
Runs scored	19	2
Batting average	4.75	2.00
100s/50s	0/0	0/0
Top score	9	2
Balls bowled	803	100
Wickets	11	3
Bowling average	38.09	19.66
5 wickets in innings	–	–
10 wickets in match	–	n/a
Best bowling	4/85	3/42
Catches/stumpings	0/–	0/–
- Source: Cricinfo, 18 November 2015

Charles Peter Thrale Cantlay (born 4 February 1954) is an English businessman and former first-class cricketer.

Cantlay was educated at Radley College and Oriel College, Oxford. A fast bowler, he made his first-class debut for Oxford University in 1975, and took 4 for 85 and 4 for 102 in the first two innings of the season, but was less effective thereafter, and played in only six of Oxford's 14 first-class matches. Wisden said his bowling "had genuine pace" but "his direction at times was wayward". Scyld Berry thought his action was suspect. He also played in two List A matches for Combined Universities, taking 3 for 42 in the victory over Northamptonshire.

Cantlay joined Alexander Howden Reinsurance Brokers Ltd in 1976, and became managing director of the company's marine division in 1986 and chief executive officer in 1992. He joined AON Group Ltd in 1997, and became chairman of the marine and energy reinsurance division in 2000. He is a Liveryman of the Worshipful Company of Haberdashers.
