= Mike Cann =

Welsh cricketer (born 1965)

Personal information
- Full name: Michael James Cann
- Born: 4 July 1965 (age 61); Cardiff, Glamorgan, Wales
- Batting: Left-handed
- Bowling: Right-arm offbreak

Domestic team information
- Years: Team
- 1986–1991: Glamorgan
- 1989/90: Orange Free State
- 1990/91–1992/93: Griqualand West
- 1993/94: Boland
- 1998: Huntingdonshire
- FC debut: 13 September 1986 Glamorgan v Essex
- Last FC: 21 January 1994 Boland v Eastern Transvaal
- LA debut: 2 May 1987 Combined Universities v Hampshire
- Last LA: 22 September 1993 Boland v Canterbury

Career statistics
Competition	First-class	List A
Matches	67	42
Runs scored	2,896	723
Batting average	28.39	22.59
100s/50s	4/14	1/3
Top score	141	106*
Balls bowled	5,345	1,057
Wickets	70	15
Bowling average	36.65	54.93
5 wickets in innings	1	0
10 wickets in match	0	0
Best bowling	5/68	3/40
Catches/stumpings	29/–	7/–
- Source: CricketArchive, 21 December 2009

Michael James Cann (born 4 July 1965) is a former cricketer from Wales. He played first-class and one-day cricket for Glamorgan, Orange Free State, Griqualand West, Boland and the Impalas between 1986 and 1994. He was a left-handed batsman and right-arm offbreak bowler.

A middle-order and opening batsman, Cann scored four first-class centuries, three of them in South Africa. His highest score was 141 (after scoring 80 in the first innings) when Griqualand West successfully chased 291 to defeat Boland in 1990–91. His one century for Glamorgan was the 109 he scored against Somerset in 1989. His best first-class bowling figures were 5 for 68 (match figures of 41–17–87–8) for Boland B against Western Transvaal in 1993–94, his last first-class season.

Cann studied Biochemistry at Swansea University, and has worked as a biochemist since the end of his cricket career.
