= Michael Petchey =

English cricketer

Personal information
- Full name: Michael David Petchey
- Born: 16 December 1958 (age 67); Ealing, Middlesex, England
- Batting: Right-handed
- Bowling: Right-arm medium

Domestic team information
- Years: Team
- 1983–1984: Oxford University

Career statistics
| Competition | First-class | List A |
|---|---|---|
| Matches | 7 | 1 |
| Runs scored | 21 | 0 |
| Batting average | 3.50 | – |
| 100s/50s | –/– | –/– |
| Top score | 18 | – |
| Balls bowled | 1,442 | 48 |
| Wickets | 16 | – |
| Bowling average | 55.37 | – |
| 5 wickets in innings | – | – |
| 10 wickets in match | – | – |
| Best bowling | 4/65 | – |
| Catches/stumpings | 3/– | 1/– |
- Source: Cricinfo, 31 August 2019

Michael David Petchey (born 16 December 1958) is an English former cricketer.

Petchey was born at Ealing in December 1958. He later studied at Christ Church, Oxford. While studying at Oxford, he made his debut in first-class cricket for Oxford University against Northamptonshire at Oxford in 1983. He played first-class cricket for Oxford until 1984, making seven appearances. Playing as a right-arm medium pace bowler, he took 16 wickets at an average of 55.37, with best figures of 4 for 65. In addition to playing first-class cricket while at Oxford, he also made a single List A one-day appearance for the Combined Universities cricket team in the 1983 Benson & Hedges Cup.
