= Mark Chadwick =

English cricketer (born 1963)

Mark Robert Chadwick (born 9 February 1963) is a former English cricketer active from 1983 to 1987 who played for Lancashire. He was born in Rochdale. He appeared in 33 first-class matches as a righthanded batsman who bowled right arm off break. He scored 1,197 runs with a highest score of 132, his only century, and held 15 catches, but took no wickets.
