= Timothy Orrell =

English cricketer

Timothy Orrell (born 25 November 1967) is a former English cricketer. He was a right-handed batsman and a right-arm medium-pace bowler who played for Lancashire during the 1991 season. Orrell was born in Prestwich, Lancashire.

Orrell's cricketing career started in 1986, when he played a game in an Oxford and Cambridge Festival tournament, for a Lancashire side which run out ten-wicket winners. Orrell played his debut Second XI Championship season in 1989, and played two matches in the Benson and Hedges Cup competition of 1990 for Combined Universities.

Lancashire got to the semi-finals of the Second XI Trophy competition of 1990, following which he was noticed by the first team selectors and, during June 1991, was given his first and only first-class appearance, for Lancashire against Oxford University. Orrell scored 21 runs during the game from the opening order. Orrell continued to represent the Second XI until the end of the 1991 season.

Orrell is now a specialist Physics teacher at Unsworth Academy.
