= Christopher Aworth =

English cricketer (born 1953)

Personal information
- Full name: Christopher John Aworth
- Born: 19 February 1953 (age 73); Wimbledon
- Batting: Left-handed
- Bowling: Slow left-arm orthodox
- Role: Batsman

Domestic team information
- Years: Team
- 1972–1976: Cambridge University
- 1974–1976: Surrey
- FC debut: 21 April 1973 Cambridge University v Warwickshire
- Last FC: 10 July 1976 Surrey v Kent
- LA debut: 27 April 1974 Cambridge University v Kent
- Last LA: 18 July 1976 Surrey v Nottinghamshire

Career statistics
Competition	FC	LA
Matches	56	25
Runs scored	2,552	392
Batting average	26.04	15.68
100s/50s	3/15	0/1
Top score	135	67
Balls bowled	834	–
Wickets	7	–
Bowling average	68.00	–
5 wickets in innings	0	–
10 wickets in match	0	–
Best bowling	2/23	–
Catches/stumpings	22/–	2/–
- Source: CricInfo, 16 April 2014

Christopher John Aworth (born 19 February 1953) is a retired cricketer for Surrey and Cambridge University. A left-handed batsman and occasional left-arm spin bowler born in Wimbledon, Aworth played for Surrey's Second XI from 1971 before appearing for Cambridge against the MCC in 1972 and making his first-class debut for them against Warwickshire in 1973. In July 1974 he was selected for Surrey's First XI and debuted against Lancashire. He would play twenty-eight County Championship matches for Surrey, as well as eighteen one day games in the John Player League and Benson & Hedges Cup. He scored 67 in the semi-final of the 1976 Benson & Hedges Cup. For Cambridge he made thirty-one appearances in total. Across his first-class career, he scored 2,552 runs including three centuries. His professional career ended in 1976 with matches against the British Army.

== Playing career ==
Aworth, who was born in Wimbledon, played for Wimbledon Cricket Club through the 1960s. He was a "valuable asset" at the club, as was his father who also played there.

=== Surrey Second XI ===
Aworth began his professional playing career with Surrey's Second XI on 4 August 1971 with his debut game against Sussex's own Second XI. Played at a cricket ground in Horsham, the match saw Sussex declare at 205/2, and though Surrey made 160 and 138, none of the batsmen's scores are recorded. He then played several matches for Surrey's U-25 team, beginning with a game against the Sussex U-25 team on 4 May 1972. Several of these games, against Essex, Middlesex and Middlesex took place in May and June that year. He also made 25 and 17 against the Kent Second XI in July, and he captained the Surrey Colts against the Scottish Cricket Union Colts in August. Several Second XI games followed against Middlesex, Hampshire and Glamorgan.

=== Cambridge ===
In 1973 Aworth's father John died. At the start of the 1973 cricket season when he had gone up to St Catharine's College, Cambridge from Tiffin School, and he was selected for the First XI cricket team to play in the University matches, beginning with Warwickshire on 21 April. Batting at three, he scored 25 and 10. He would play eleven University matches that season, scoring 379 runs at 18.95 with a best of 45. In April 1974 the season started with University matches against Leicestershire and Nottinghamshire as well as three Benson & Hedges games. The last of these was against Surrey, with Aworth scoring three. He made 97 against Warwickshire on 4 May, and 56 against both Gloucestershire on 8 May and Kent on 5 June. He also scored 77 against the touring Indian cricket team. These scores led to a call up to the First XI for Surrey in mid-July.

=== Surrey ===
Aworth's debut for Surrey on 13 July against Lancashire saw him out for 25 in his only innings as the match ended as a rain-affected draw. He made 19 and 17 in his next game against Gloucestershire, and opened the batting in a one-day game against Lancashire, scoring 27. In all first-class cricket that year, he played seventeen games, scoring 767 runs at 28.40, and he fared poorly in one day cricket with only 59 runs from six games.

The following season Aworth returned to Cambridge to play University Matches through April and May. He scored 51 against Northamptonshire on 30 April, and 56 against Nottinghamshire on 14 May. He returned to Surrey for the summer, and scored 115 opening the batting against Middlesex, his maiden County Championship century. This was followed by knocks of 43 against Essex, 55 against Worcestershire, and 63 against Sussex. He was still moving around the batting order for Surrey in one day matches, sometimes opening the batting and then batting at number three or four in later games. He continued to struggle in the shorter format, playing 12 games but scoring only 172 runs at an average of 14.33. He nevertheless continued to enjoy a richer return in first-class cricket, adding two further centuries for Cambridge to his season tally. He scored over 1,000 first-class runs for the season, ending it with 1,057 runs at an average of 31.08, with seven half-centuries as well as his hundreds.

He continued to find the one day game challenging in 1976, however. He would only managed 161 runs across seven matches, and he did not feature in Surrey's campaign to win the Benson & Hedges Cup until the semi-final stage. Nevertheless, he registered his career-best one day score, 67, against Kent in that semi-final. Kent were victorious, however, thanks to a century by Mike Denness. In the four-day game, he scored a half-century against a touring West Indies cricket team later that month. He passed 2,500 first-class runs against Essex on 3 July, but overall he could not recapture his form of the previous season, scoring only 349 from ten matches at 20.52. He played his final first-class game of the season on 10 July against Kent. He returned to the Second XI to face the Army in August, scoring 52.
