= Neil Russom =

English cricketer (born 1958)

Neil Russom (born 3 December 1958) played first-class and List A cricket for Cambridge University and Somerset between 1979 and 1983. He was born at Finchley.
