= 1984 Benson & Hedges Cup =

- Administrator: Test and County Cricket Board
- Cricket format: Limited overs cricket (55 overs per innings)
- Champions: Lancashire (1st title)
- Participants: 20
- Matches: 47
- Most runs: 366 Dennis Amiss (Warwickshire)
- Most wickets: 16 Derek Pringle (Essex)

The 1984 Benson & Hedges Cup was the thirteenth edition of cricket's Benson & Hedges Cup.

The competition was won by Lancashire County Cricket Club.

== Fixtures and results ==
=== Group stage ===
==== Group A ====
Team	Pld	W	L	NR	A	Pts	BowSR
Warwickshire	4	4	0	0	0	8	36.167
Yorkshire	4	3	1	0	0	6	38.824
Leicestershire	4	2	2	0	0	4	61.429
Northamptonshire	4	1	3	0	0	2	51.360
Scotland	4	0	4	0	0	0	62.667

==== Group B ====
Team	Pld	W	L	NR	A	Pts	BowSR
Nottinghamshire	4	3	1	0	0	6	38.129
Lancashire	4	3	1	0	0	6	41.742
Derbyshire	4	3	1	0	0	6	44.000
Worcestershire	4	1	3	0	0	2	45.103
Minor Counties	4	0	4	0	0	0	59.211

==== Group C ====
Team	Pld	W	L	NR	A	Pts	BowSR
Sussex	4	3	1	0	0	6	37.029
Somerset	4	3	1	0	0	6	40.000
Kent	4	2	2	0	0	4	33.973
Glamorgan	4	1	3	0	0	2	45.296
Middlesex	4	1	3	0	0	0	49.600

==== Group D ====
Team	Pld	W	L	NR	A	Pts	BowSR
Essex	4	4	0	0	0	8	36.857
Surrey	4	2	2	0	0	4	44.667
Hampshire	4	2	2	0	0	4	45.308
Gloucestershire	4	1	3	0	0	2	35.595
Oxford and Cambridge Universities	4	1	3	0	0	2	47.583

=== Quarter-finals ===
6 June 1984
(scorecard)

Essex; 157 all out (55 overs)	v	Lancashire; 158/6 (52.5 overs)
Keith Fletcher 48; Steve O'Shaughnessy 3/10 (11 overs)		John Abrahams 53; Derek Pringle 5/35 (10 overs)

Lancashire won by 4 wickets
County Ground, Chelmsford
Umpires: John Harris & Alan Whitehead
Player of the match: John Abrahams (Lancashire)

6, 7 June 1984
(scorecard)

Nottinghamshire; 256/3 (55 overs)	v	Surrey; 89 all out (35.3 overs)
Derek Randall 103*; Sylvester Clarke 1/34 (11 overs)		Derek Thomas 19; Kevin Saxelby 3/12 (8 overs)

Nottinghamshire won by 167 runs
Trent Bridge, Nottingham
Umpires: Barrie Leadbeater & Peter Wight
Player of the match: Clive Rice (Nottinghamshire)

- Reserve day used. No play on first day.

6 June 1984
(scorecard)

Yorkshire; 260/5 (55 overs)	v	Sussex; 223 all out (53.3 overs)
Martyn Moxon 79; Colin Wells 1/28 (7 overs)		Alan Wells 51; Steve Oldham 3/24 (11 overs)

Yorkshire won by 37 runs
County Ground, Hove
Umpires: Bill Alley & Roy Palmer
Player of the match: Martyn Moxon (Yorkshire)

6 June 1984
(scorecard)

Warwickshire; 282/5 (55 overs)	v	Somerset; 216 all out (47.1 overs)
Andy Lloyd 77; Colin Dredge 2/66 (11 overs)		Martin Crowe 89; Norman Gifford 3/45 (10.1 overs)

Warwickshire won by 66 runs
Edgbaston, Birmingham
Umpires: John Holder & Ray Julian
Player of the match: Andy Lloyd (Warwickshire)

=== Semi-finals ===
20, 21 June 1984
(scorecard)

Nottinghamshire; 223/6 (55 overs)	v	Lancashire; 224/4 (52.2 overs)
Chris Broad 49; Jack Simmons 2/23 (11 overs)		Mark Chadwick 87; Chris Broad 2/73 (11 overs)

Lancashire won by 6 wickets
Trent Bridge, Nottingham
Umpires: Jack Birkenshaw & Ken Palmer
Player of the match: Mark Chadwick (Lancashire)

- Reserve day used. Lancashire were 41/0 (12.2 overs) at the close of the first day's play

20 June 1984
(scorecard)

Warwickshire; 276/4 (55 overs)	v	Yorkshire; 273/8 (55 overs)
Alvin Kallicharran 85; Arnie Sidebottom 2/51 (11 overs)		Kevin Sharp 83; Anton Ferreira 3/59 (11 overs)

Warwickshire won by 3 runs
Headingley, Leeds
Umpires: Don Oslear & Nigel Plews
Player of the match: David Bairstow (Yorkshire)

=== Final ===
21 July 1984
(scorecard)

Warwickshire; 139 all out (50.4 overs)	v	Lancashire; 140/4 (42.4 overs)
Alvin Kallicharran 70; Paul Allott 3/15 (8.4 overs)		Neil Fairbrother 36*; Anton Ferreira 2/26 (11 overs)

Lancashire won by 6 wickets
Lord's, London
Umpires: David Constant & David Evans
Player of the match: John Abrahams (Lancashire)

== See also ==
Benson & Hedges Cup
