= Greg Macmillan =

English cricketer, solicitor, and schoolteacher

Gregor Macmillan
Personal information
- Full name: Gregor Innes Macmillan
- Born: 7 August 1969 (age 57); Guildford, England
- Batting: Right-handed
- Bowling: occasional off spin

Domestic team information
- Years: Team
- 1993–1998: Leicestershire

Career statistics
Competition	FC
Matches	53
Runs scored	2024
Batting average	26.63
100s/50s	3/11
Top score	122
Balls bowled	n.a
Wickets	23
Bowling average	n.a
5 wickets in innings	0
10 wickets in match	0
Best bowling	3/13
Catches/stumpings
- Source: Cricinfo

Gregor Innes Macmillan (born 7 August 1969) is an English former first-class cricketer, later a solicitor and schoolteacher.

== Cricket ==
Macmillan played 53 first-class matches for Oxford University, Gloucestershire and Leicestershire between 1993 and 1998, scoring 2024 runs as a right-handed batsman. He made 3 centuries, with a best of 122. He also took 23 wickets with his occasional off spin. He also played 45 list A one-day games. The 'mercurial' Macmillan joined Leicestershire in the middle of the 1995 season after captaining Oxford University and began his County career in fine form. He became only the third Leicestershire player to score a century on their Championship debut after recording 103 in the second innings in a victory against Sussex at Hove. A week later, Macmillan followed his excellent display with a performance of equal pomp in another victory, this time against Surrey at Grace Road, in which he scored 122 – his second century in as many matches for Leicestershire. These performances earned him the 'Player of the Month' award for July in his inaugural month at the club. Macmillan ended the 1995 season with an average of 43.22, bettered only by the great Hansie Cronje. Macmillan went on to win both the 1996 County Championship with Leicestershire and also the 1996 Bain Hogg Trophy in a remarkable season for the club.

== After cricket ==
Macmillan holds a degree in Philosophy and Politics from the University of Southampton and an Advanced Diploma in Social Administration from the University of Oxford. He qualified and practised as a solicitor before taking up teaching. He was an assistant housemaster at St John's School, Leatherhead, then became housemaster of Turner House at Marlborough College in 2012.
