= Martin Speight =

English cricketer

Martin Speight (born 24 October 1967) is a former English cricketer. He was a right-handed batsman and a wicket-keeper. After his education at Hurstpierpoint College and St Chad's College, Durham University, he played for Sussex, Wellington and Durham in first-class cricket, before capping off a 17-year career with Northumberland.

He joined Sussex in 1986, playing two Youth Test matches the following calendar year, against Sri Lanka Young Cricketers. In July 1987, he participated in his debut Second XI Championship match, in a draw against Hampshire, soon graduating to the First XI side. He first played in the 1987 B&H Cup, continuing in that competition for five years, before playing in it for the last time in 1996. In 1992 Speight won the Walter Lawrence Trophy for the fastest first-class century. He left Sussex in 1996.

Speight later moved to Durham, playing there until the 2001 season. While he was a first class player he scored 9,692 runs and 15 centuries. He took two wickets at an average of 16. He took 292 catches and recorded five stumpings. He finished his career in 2003 for Northumberland, making his bow in the 2003 C&G Trophy. Following his retirement, he coached South Northumberland CC, moving between several schools as a cricket coach.

Speight began his teaching career at Mowden Hall Prep School in Northumberland, and later became head of hockey and cricket at Sedbergh School, a private boarding school in Cumbria. He hosts an annual 'Martin Speight Cricket academy', during the summer. He is also a commentator for BBC radio Newcastle for selected Durham fixtures. In 2024 he was appointed director of cricket at Repton School.
