= 1983 John Player Special League =

- Administrator: Test and County Cricket Board
- Cricket format: Limited overs cricket (40 overs per innings)
- Tournament format: League
- Champions: Yorkshire (1st title)
- Participants: 17
- Matches: 136
- Most runs: 661 Gordon Greenidge (Hampshire)
- Most wickets: 27 John Shepherd (Gloucestershire)

The 1983 John Player Special League was the fifteenth edition of what was generally known as the Sunday League. The competition was won for the first time by Yorkshire County Cricket Club.

== Standings ==
Team	Pld	W	T	L	N/R	A	Pts	R/R
Yorkshire (C)	16	10	0	3	1	2	46	4.741
Somerset	16	10	0	3	1	2	46	5.283
Kent	16	8	0	3	2	3	42	5.805
Sussex	16	9	0	5	1	1	40	4.707
Hampshire	16	9	0	6	0	1	38	5.463
Derbyshire	16	7	0	5	1	3	36	4.757
Essex	16	7	0	5	0	4	36	5.489
Lancashire	16	5	1	5	2	3	32	4.648
Middlesex	16	7	0	7	0	2	32	4.801
Glamorgan	16	6	0	8	1	1	28	5.084
Leicestershire	16	4	0	7	1	4	26	4.758
Surrey	16	4	0	7	0	5	26	5.067
Worcestershire	16	4	3	7	0	2	26	4.852
Gloucestershire	16	4	0	8	0	4	24	5.308
Northamptonshire	16	5	0	10	0	1	22	4.422
Nottinghamshire	16	4	1	9	0	2	22	4.917
Warwickshire	16	4	1	9	2	0	22	5.479
Team marked (C) finished as champions. Source: CricketArchive

== See also ==
Sunday League
