= 1983 English cricket season =

The 1983 English cricket season was the 84th in which the County Championship had been an official competition. The third Prudential World Cup was won by India. New Zealand won a Test match in England for the first time. Essex won the Schweppes County Championship and Yorkshire won the Sunday League. The MCCA Knockout Trophy was inaugurated.

== Honours ==
- Schweppes County Championship - Essex
- NatWest Trophy - Somerset
- Sunday League - Yorkshire
- Benson & Hedges Cup - Middlesex
- Minor Counties Championship - Hertfordshire
- MCCA Knockout Trophy - Cheshire
- Second XI Championship - Leicestershire II
- Wisden - Mohinder Amarnath, Jeremy Coney, John Emburey, Mike Gatting, Chris Smith

== Test series ==
New Zealand played four Tests against England following the World Cup. Although they were heavily beaten in three of these, they won the second test at Headingley. This was New Zealand's first Test victory in England after 29 attempts. It was New Zealand's first away test win in over 13 years.

== Annual reviews ==
- Playfair Cricket Annual 1984
- Wisden Cricketers' Almanack 1984
