= 1987 English cricket season =

The 1987 English cricket season was the 88th in which the County Championship had been an official competition. Nottinghamshire achieved a Championship and NatWest Trophy "double". John Player ended their sponsorship of the Sunday League after an eighteen-year spell and the competition sponsorship was taken over by Refuge Assurance. Pakistan defeated England in the Test series with one win and four draws.

== Honours ==
- County Championship - Nottinghamshire
- NatWest Trophy - Nottinghamshire
- Sunday League - Worcestershire
- Benson & Hedges Cup - Yorkshire
- Minor Counties Championship - Buckinghamshire
- MCCA Knockout Trophy - Cheshire
- Second XI Championship - Kent II, Yorkshire II (shared title)
- Wisden - Jonathan Agnew, Neil Foster, David Hughes, Peter Roebuck, Saleem Malik

== External sources ==
- CricketArchive – season and tournament itineraries

== Annual reviews ==
- Playfair Cricket Annual 1988
- Wisden Cricketers' Almanack 1988
