= British Universities cricket team =

British cricket team

The British Universities cricket team was a cricket team whose players were drawn from university students studying in Great Britain. The team played under the title of Combined Universities until 1995. The team played List A cricket from 1975 to 1998 and first-class cricket from 1993 to 2006.

== History ==
Combined Universities' first matches in top-level cricket came in the 1975 Benson & Hedges Cup, a List A competition. In their first game, on 3 May, they beat Worcestershire County Cricket Club by 66 runs, thanks largely to an outstanding all-round performance by future Pakistan captain Imran Khan, who top-scored with 35 runs and took four wickets for four runs from 8.3 overs as Worcestershire were bowled out for 92 runs. The team played as an Oxford and Cambridge Universities team initially. Players from universities other than Oxford and Cambridge were first selected for the Benson and Hedges Cup in the 1987 season. The first team drawn from the wider university community, to face Hampshire on 2 May 1987, included Nasser Hussain, John Stephenson, Martin Speight and Alan Fordham from Durham, Mike Cann from Swansea and Peter Perera from Exeter. By 1989 there were five players from Durham in the squad but only three from Oxford and Cambridge.

From 1975 to 1992 inclusive the team played only in the Benson and Hedges Cup. Their most successful year was 1989, in which a team led by future England captain Mike Atherton and containing Nasser Hussain, who also went on to captain England, as well as future England Test player Steve James, beat Surrey and Worcestershire in the group stages, their first wins in 13 years. Worcestershire were the defending County Champions and went on to win the 1989 County Championship with seven past or future Test players in their team, yet the match "constituted a stuffing. Without doubt it is the finest ever limited-overs performance". The team became the first non-first-class team to reach the knockout stages of the competition and narrowly lost by just three runs against Somerset in the quarter-finals.

The team continued to play in the Benson & Hedges Cup, and in June 1993 played its first first-class cricket match. Their opponents were the touring Australians at The University Parks in Oxford. Combined Universities also played first-class matches against the New Zealanders in 1994 and the West Indians in 1995.

From the 1995 season onwards the team was renamed British Universities, partly to reflect the fact that players were now increasingly coming from outside Oxford University Cricket Club and Cambridge University Cricket Club, both of which have had first-class cricket status since the 19th century. The team played under its new title in the Benson & Hedges Cup until the end of the 1998 season when the competition was restructured. They played another 10 first-class matches, all against touring international teams, until their final match in 2006 against the Sri Lankan tourists. The team generally used either Fenner's in Cambridge or the University Parks in Oxford as their 'home' ground.

From 2007, the Marylebone Cricket Club Universities team played games primarily against county second XIs until 2017, including entering the Second XI Championship from 2009 to 2017. This continued the tradition of playing home games at Fenner's or the University Parks, although a number of home games were also played at Leeds University's Weetwood Playing Fields. The MCC Universities team also played against other touring English teams in Dubai in 2013 and in Abu Dhabi in 2014 and 2015.

== Touring teams ==
Teams playing under the names Combined Universities and British Universities have toured overseas on a number of occasions. A Combined Universities team played in the Netherlands in 1987 and a British Universities team played in South Africa in late 1999, playing a number of matches against South African university teams. In 2012 a team played two matches in Pakistan, the first time an overseas touring team had played in Pakistan since the 2009 attack on the Sri Lankan team's tour bus which resulted in injuries to seven of the Sri Lankan players and the deaths of eight Pakistanis. A team took part in a student cricket competition in Sri Lanka in April 2013.

== See also ==
- Oxford and Cambridge Universities cricket team
