= List of parks in St. Petersburg, Florida =

The following is a list of parks in St. Petersburg, Florida, United States.

- Abercrombie Park
- Albert Whitted Park
- Allendale Park
- Arrowhead Park
- Auburn Street Park
- Azalea Park
- Bartlett Park
- Baywood Park Indian
- Bayou Highlands
- Bay Vista Park
- Bear Creek Park
- Blanc Park
- Booker Creeker
- Booker Creek Park
- Boyd Hill Nature Preserve
- Broadwater Park
- Campell Park
- Central Oak Park
- Childs Park Linear
- Childs Park
- Clam Bayou Nature Preserve
- Coconut Park
- Coffee Pot Riviera
- Cook Park
- Coquina Key Park
- Crescent Lake Park
- Crisp Park
- Dell Holmes Park
- Demens Landing Park
- Denver Park
- Disston Lake Park
- Downtown Waterfront Park
- Dwight Jones Park
- Eaglecrest Lake Park
- Edgemoor Park
- Elva Rouse Park
- Enoch Davis Park
- Euclid Lake Park
- Flora Wylie Park
- Forrest Bluff Park
- Fossil Park
- Fountain of Youth
- Franklin Heights Park
- George Hedke Park
- Gizella Kopsick Palm Arboretum
- Gladden Park
- Golf Creek Park
- Granada Terrace Park
- Grandview Park
- Harbordale Park
- Harding Park
- Harshaw Lake
- Historic Round Lake Park
- Indian Mound Park
- International Park
- Jack Puryear Park
- Jamestown Park
- Jorgensen Lake Park
- Jungle Prada De Narvaez Park
- Katherine B. Tippetts Park
- Kelly Lake Park
- Kenwood Dog Park
- Lake Maggiore Park
- Lake Pasadena Park
- Lake Vista Park
- Lakewood Terrace Neighborhood Park
- Lassing Park
- Leslee Lake Park
- Linear Park
- Little bayou Park
- Louise Lake Park
- Lynch Lake Park
- Mastry Lake Park
- Maximo Park
- Meadowlawn Park
- Millennium Youth Park
- Mirror Lake Park
- North Central Neighborhood Park
- North Shore Park
- North Straub Park
- Northeast Exchange Club Coffee Pot Park
- Northeast Mini Park
- Northwest Park
- Palmetto Park
- Park on Park
- Pasadena Circle
- Pasadena Triangle Park
- Perry Bayview Community Playground
- Pier Park
- Pinellas Point Park
- Pioneer Park
- Playlot 1
- Playlot 2
- Playlot 3
- Pocket Park
- Poynter Park
- Queen Dennis Park
- Rio Vista Park
- Riviera Bay Park
- Roberts Park
- Roser Park
- Royal "Roy" Eden Jr. Park
- Seminole Park
- Sheffield Lake Park
- Shore Acres Mini Park
- Shore Acres Park
- Silver Lake Playlot
- Sirmons Lake Park
- Snell Isle Park
- South Shore Park
- South Staub Park
- Spa Beach Park
- Sunhaven Lake Park
- Sunset Park
- Switch Park
- Sylvia C. Boring Park
- Taylor Park
- Trailhead Park
- Treasure Island Beach
- Tyrone Park
- Unity Park
- Unnamed Lake
- Vinoy Park
- Walter Fuller Park
- Westminster Community Playground
- Wildwood Park
- Williams Park
- Wood Park
- Woodlawn Park
