= St. Petersburg Bar Association =

St. Petersburg Bar Association is a voluntary Bar Association located in St. Petersburg, Pinellas County, Florida. The St. Petersburg Bar Association currently has over 1,200 members. Membership includes lawyers, judges, students and affiliate members who have a relationship with the legal profession.

The St. Petersburg Bar Association provides continuing legal education programs and networking opportunities for the legal community, and also provides legal programming for the general public. Additionally, the Bar Association, along with the St. Petersburg Bar Foundation, offers a Young Lawyer Section Essay scholarship and the Judge Paul H. Roney Law Day Essay Contest scholarship for graduating Pinellas County high school seniors. Other scholarships and grants are available through the St. Petersburg Bar Foundation.

Many of the members of the Bar Association provide pro bono legal service and are very involved in other community volunteer activities. Various other free legal services are available in the St. Petersburg community through the Community Law Program, Bay Area Legal Services and Gulf Coast Legal Services.
