= St. Petersburg, Florida =

City in Florida, United States

St. Petersburg
- City
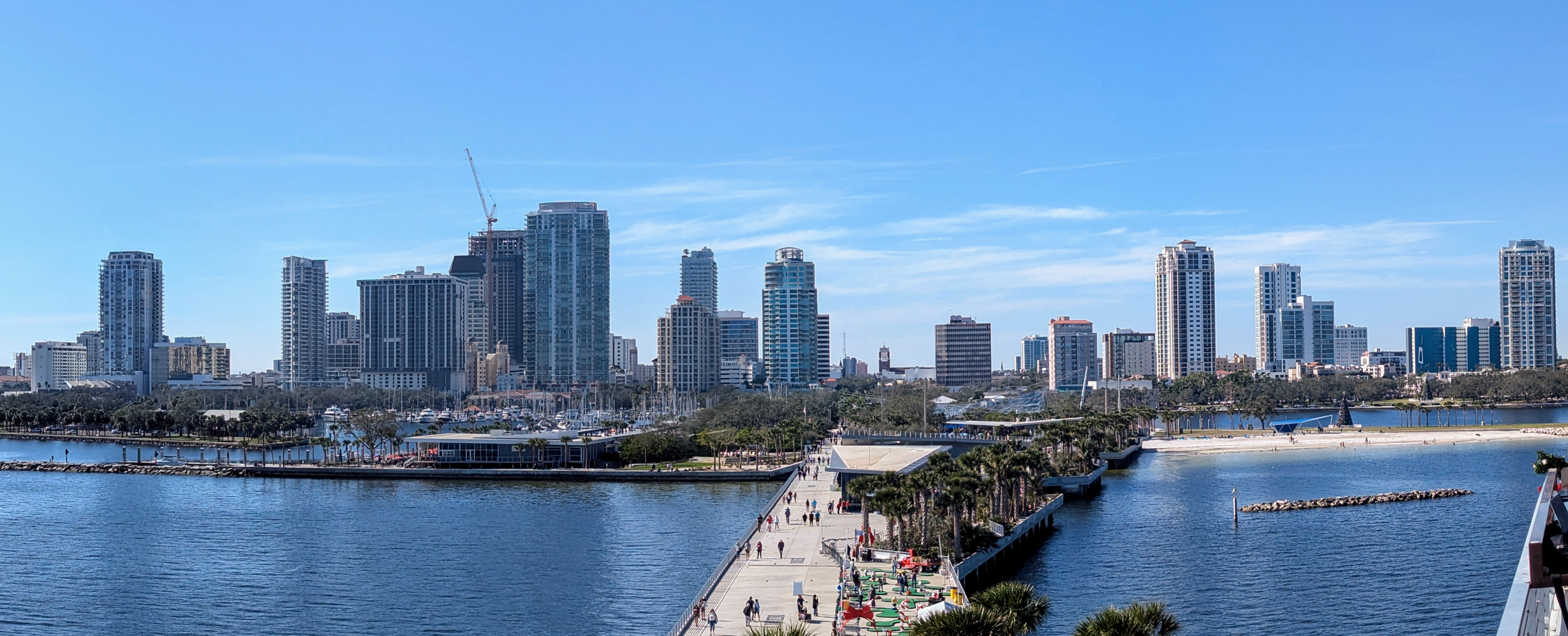
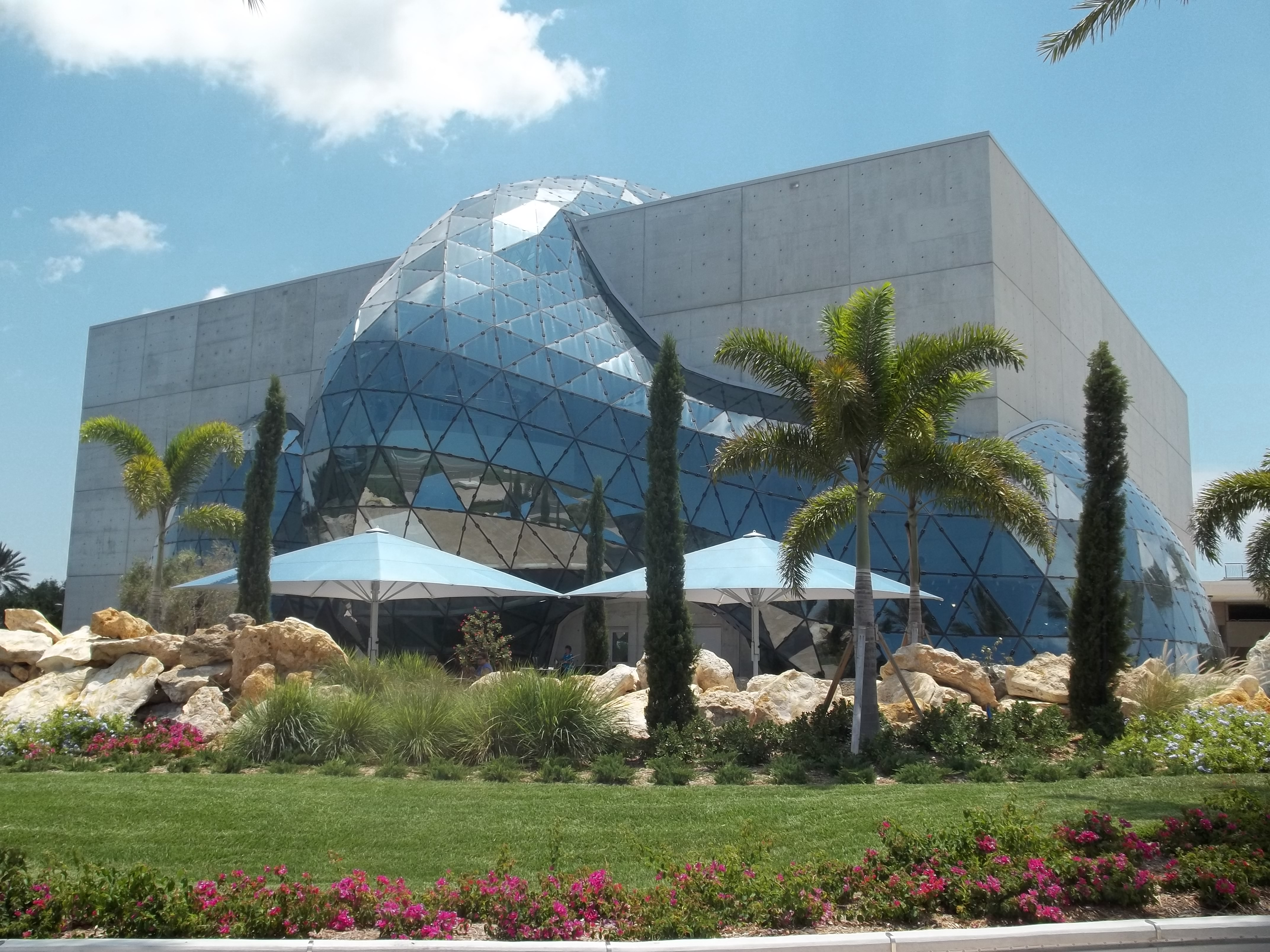
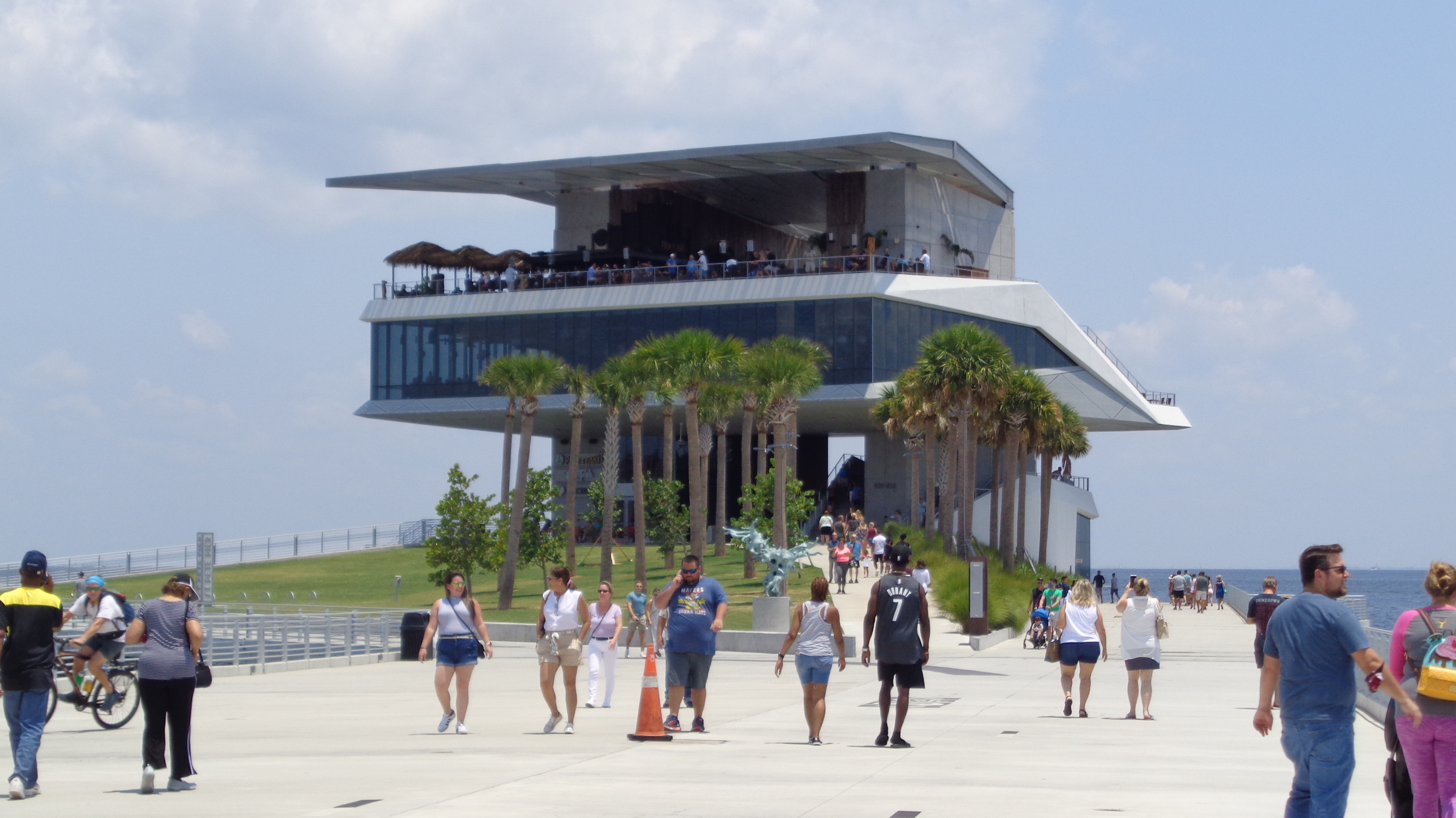
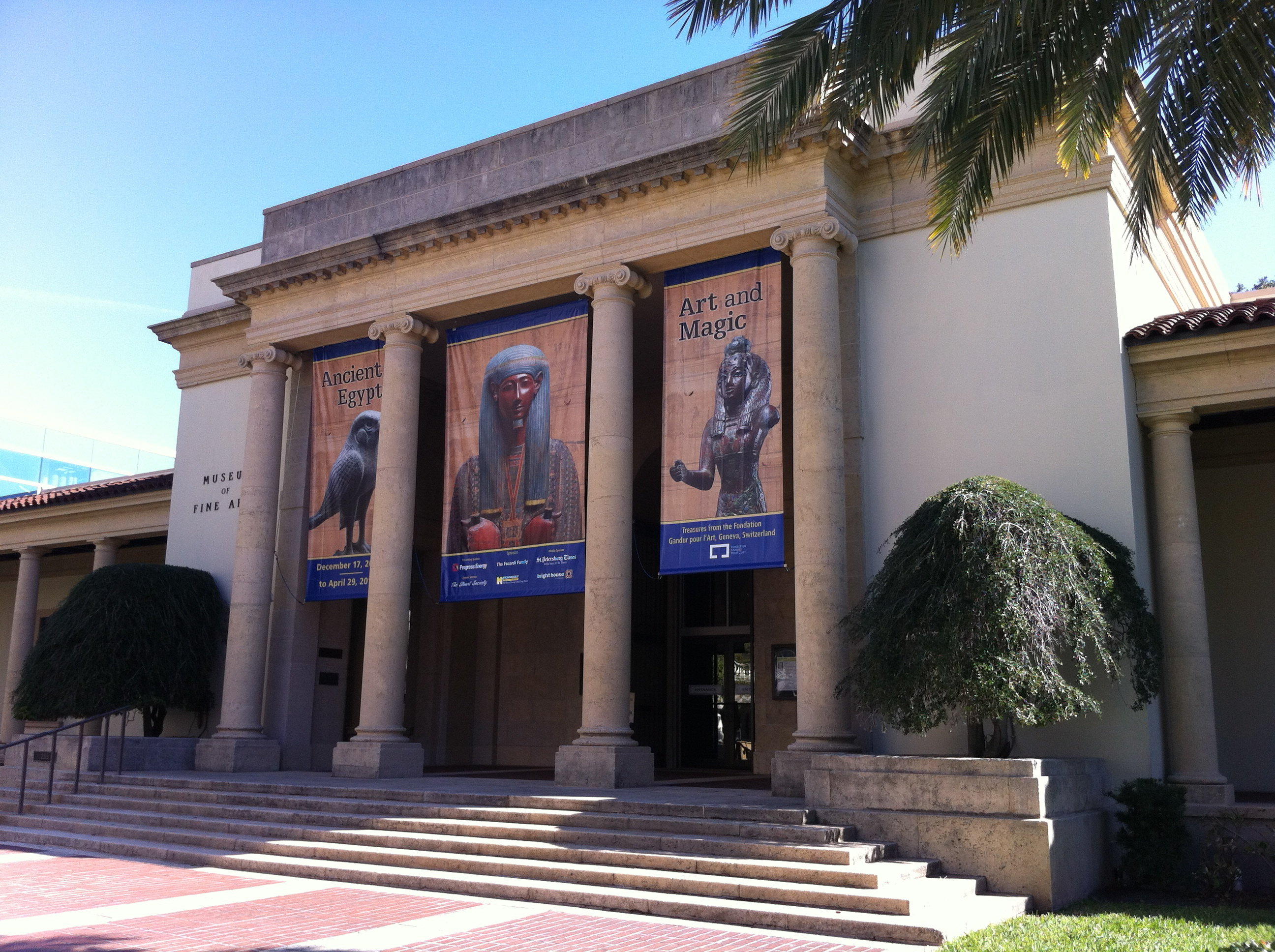
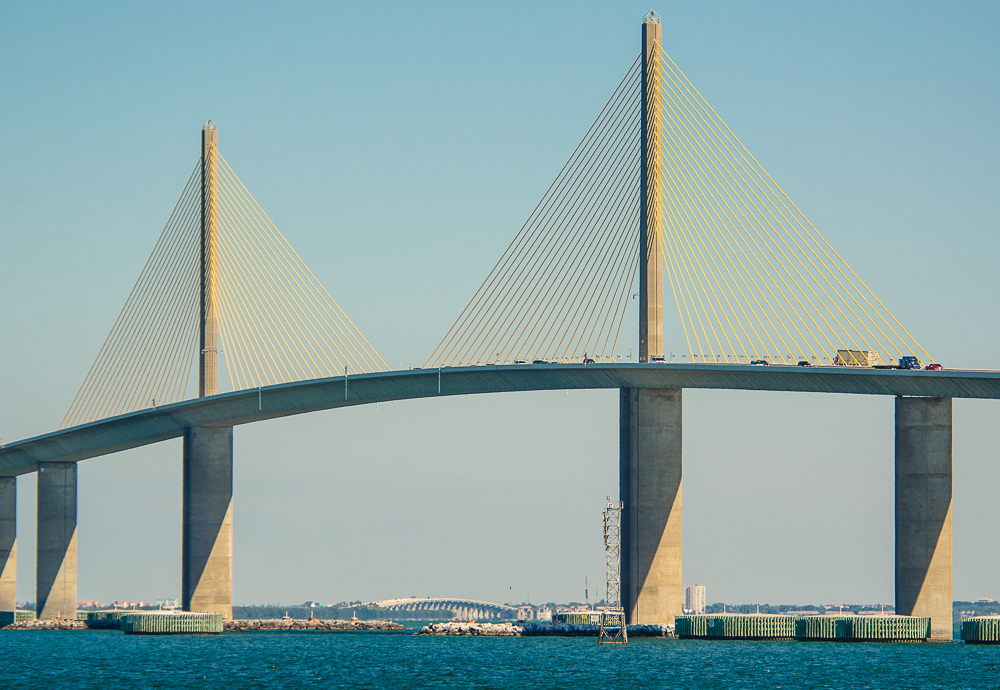
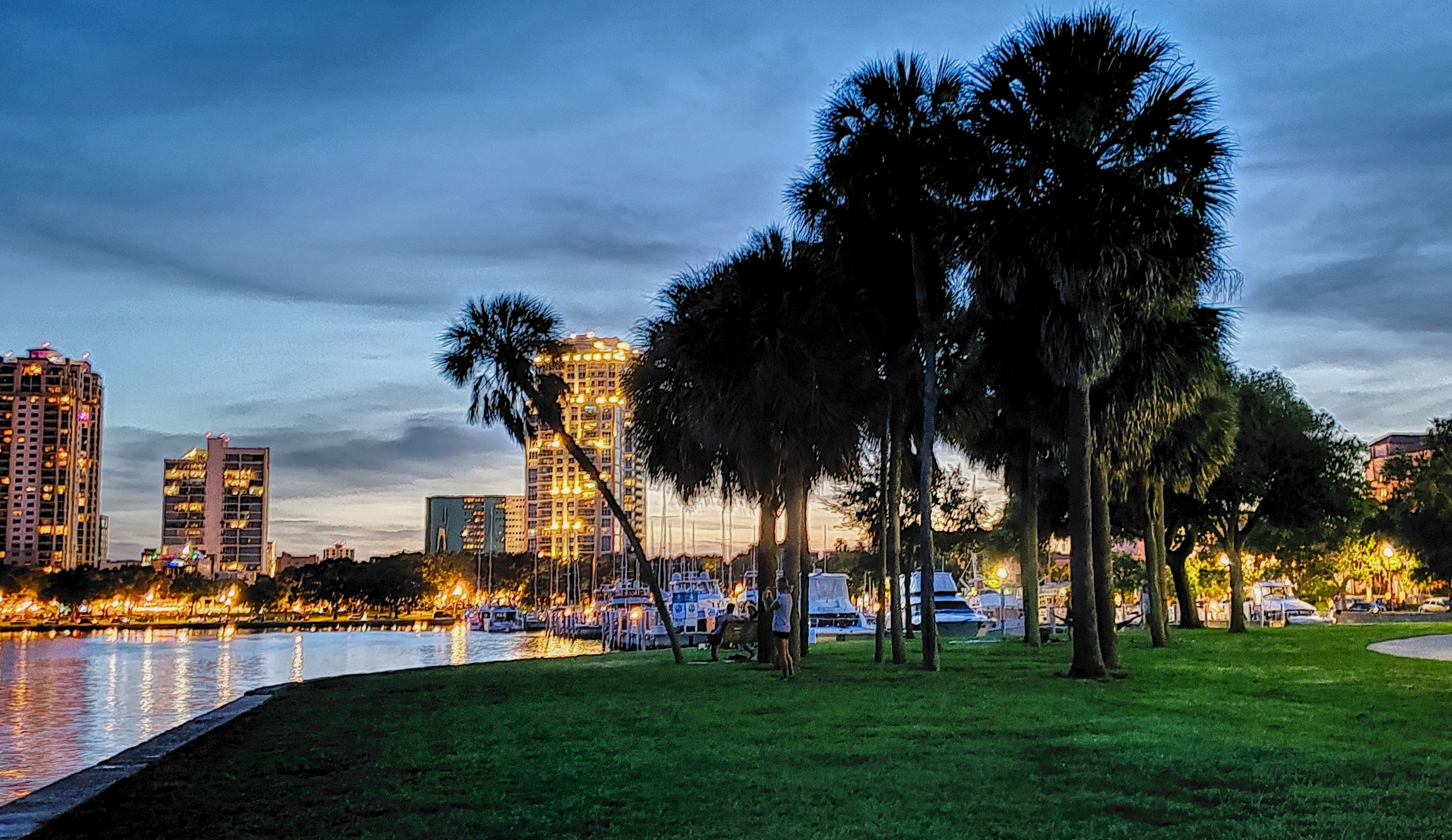
- Downtown St. Petersburg Salvador Dalí Museum St. Petersburg Pier Museum of Fine Arts Sunshine Skyway Bridge Vinoy Park

- Flag Seal
- Nicknames: "St. Pete"; "Florida's Sunshine City"
- Motto: "Always in Season"
- Interactive map of St. Petersburg
- Location within Florida Location within the United States
- Coordinates: 27°49′20″N 82°40′14″W
- Country: United States
- State: Florida
- County: Pinellas
- Founded: 1888
- Incorporated (Town of St. Petersberg): February 29, 1892
- Reincorporated (City of St. Petersburg): June 6, 1903
- Named for: Saint Petersburg, Russia

Government
  - Type: Strong Mayor-Commission

Area
  - City: 135.49 sq mi (350.93 km^{2})
  - Land: 61.87 sq mi (160.24 km^{2})
  - Water: 73.63 sq mi (190.69 km^{2})
- Elevation: 36 ft (11 m)

Population (2020)
  - City: 258,308
  - Estimate (2025): 264,033 ▲
  - Rank: 88th
  - Density: 4,175.1/sq mi (1,612.01/km^{2})
  - Urban: 2,441,770 (17th)
  - Metro: 2,870,569 (18th)
- Time zone: UTC−05:00 (Eastern (EST))
  - Summer (DST): UTC−04:00 (EDT)
- ZIP Codes: 33701-33716, 33729-33734, 33736, 33738, 33740-33743, 33747, 33784
- Area code: 727
- FIPS code: 12-63000
- GNIS feature ID: 2405401
- Website: www.stpete.org

St. Petersburg (also spelled as Saint Petersburg) is a city in Pinellas County, Florida, United States. As of the 2020 census, the population was 258,308, making it the fifth-most populous city in Florida and the most populous city in the state that is not a county seat (the city of Clearwater is the seat of Pinellas County). It is the second-most populous city in the Tampa Bay area, which is the second-largest metropolitan area in Florida with an estimated population of about 3.29 million in 2022.

St. Petersburg is located on the Pinellas peninsula between Tampa Bay and the Gulf of Mexico, and is connected to mainland Florida to the north. Locals often refer to the city as "St. Pete" or, more colloquially, "the Burg". Neighboring St. Pete Beach formally shortened its name in 1994 after a vote by its residents. St. Petersburg is governed by a mayor and city council.

With an average of 361 days of sunshine annually, and a Guinness World Record for the most consecutive days of sunshine (768 days between 1967 and 1969), it is nicknamed "The Sunshine City." Located on the Gulf of Mexico, the average water temperature is typically around 76 °F (24 °C). Due to its good weather, the city has long been a popular retirement destination, although in recent years the population has moved in a much more youthful direction.

== History ==
=== Early Spanish exploration ===
When the Spanish first arrived in the area of Tampa Bay, they encountered people of the Safety Harbor culture. About 20 sites with temple mounds have been found around Tampa Bay, with several in Pinellas County. Best known of the Safety Harbor people was the chiefdom of Tocobaga, which was likely located at the Safety Harbor site in Philippe Park in northern Pinellas County. The Pánfilo de Narváez expedition landed on the shores of Boca Ciega Bay at the Jungle Prada Site on April 14, 1528. It was the first inland exploration of North America. Of 300 men on the expedition only four survived. One of the survivors of the expedition, Álvar Núñez Cabeza de Vaca, wrote the first book describing the peoples, wildlife, flora and fauna of inland North America in his Relacion, published in Spain in 1542.

=== 19th century ===
The city was co-founded by John C. Williams, formerly of Detroit, who purchased the land in 1875, and by Peter Demens, who was instrumental in bringing the terminus of the Orange Belt Railway there in 1888. St. Petersburg was incorporated as a town on February 29, 1892, when it had a population of 300 people.

Local lore claims John C. Williams and Peter Demens flipped a coin to see who would have the honor of naming the city. When Demens won the coin toss, the city was named after Saint Petersburg, Russia, where Peter Demens had spent half of his youth, while John C. Williams named the first hotel after his birthplace, Detroit (a hotel built by Demens). The Detroit Hotel still exists downtown on Central Ave, but has been turned into a condominium.

The oldest operating hotels are the Pier Hotel (formally Hotel Cordova), built in 1921, and The Exchange Hotel (formally The Heritage Hotel), built in 1926.

The first major newspaper to debut in Tampa Bay was the St. Petersburg Times which established in 1884. Philadelphia publisher F. A. Davis turned on St. Petersburg's first electrical service in 1897. The city's first major industry was born in 1899 when Henry W. Hibbs (1862–1942), a native of Newport, North Carolina, established his wholesale fish business at the end of the railroad pier, which extended out to the shipping channel. Within a year, Hibbs Fish Company was shipping more than 1,000 pounds (450 kg) of fish each day.

A historic marker on the 2nd Avenue side of St. Peter's Episcopal Cathedral, facing Williams Park, notes that the cathedral and several adjacent churches played a central role in St. Petersburg being known as the "City of Churches." Among the oldest remaining structures downtown, St. Peter's was built in the Gothic Revival style in 1899, funded by philanthropist Edwin H. Tomlinson in honor of his father. The area surrounding Williams Park also features other historic congregations—including First Baptist, First Congregational, and First United Methodist—all established within a few decades of the city's founding in 1892. Architectural records indicate that of fewer than ten Gothic Revival buildings remaining citywide, seven churches were built between 1887 and 1925, most clustered around Williams Park and Central Avenue. Earlier still, the first Episcopal church in the area was established at Pinellas Point in 1887, prior to the city's own founding. This pattern of early church building by multiple denominations reflects how religious institutions served as foundational anchors in St. Petersburg's civic and cultural development—even before the city's official incorporation.

The Episcopalians had the opportunity of establishing the first church in the southernmost part of St. Petersburg, Florida at Pinellas Point. There was a meeting held at the home of Robert Staunton on April 20, 1887, and it was planned to construct a church named St. Bartholomew's, on Lakeview Avenue. This church was completed late in 1887 and services were held there until 1895 when the property was given to the owners of the St. Peter's Church in St. Petersburg and were used for burial purposes. Hence another first Episcopalian church in St. Petersburg was created at the lot at Eleventh street and Second avenue north and was completed late in 1889. Edwin H. Tomlinson was one of the earliest supporters of St. Petersburg, Florida, benefiting and blessing the city in many ways. In one such case, Edwin paid the price in full for the St. Peter's Church and construction of the church was completed early in 1899. In the context of St. Petersburg being nicknamed "The City of Churches," it is imperative to note how the first church and in fact many more churches were founded before even the city itself was (founded in 1888 and became a city in 1892). The various denominations of Christianity at the time practiced and planted their own churches in St. Petersburg. The order being the Episcopalian Church in 1887 then again in 1889, the Congregational Church in 1890 between Ninth and Tenth streets near the present Central avenue (the Presbyterians of the town joined forces with the Congregationalists to work together to accomplish it), the First Avenue Methodist Episcopal Church 1892 at Central avenue and First street, the First Baptist Church which began congregation in 1893 and built their church in 1896 at the southeast corner of Sixth street and Central avenue (the congregation worshipped in the First Methodist Church while the new church was being built), the Catholic Church in 1908 at Sixth street south between Fifth and Sixth avenues (the mass attended Point Pinellas beginning in 1892 and raised money to build this church in the meantime), the First Methodist Church built in 1892 at Central avenue and Seventh street, the First Christian Church built in 1909 at the corner of Second avenue and Fourth street south, the Grace Baptist Church built in 1909 at the railroad tracks on Fourth street south, the Trinity Evangelical Lutheran Church built in 1911 at Fifth street and Second avenue south, and First Church of Christ – Scientist (Christian Science Society) met in 1900 with fifteen people in the old Strowger building on the southeast corner of Central avenue and Fourth street – once the organization gathered more than sixteen members they had enough to be known as a church and an advertised practitioner – in 1913 the church bought a building at Second avenue north near Second street. In total 11 different denominations in these early founding days of the city planted their roots which were vital in helping guide these pioneers, were often a light for them, these churches were a beating heart for them – hence why these locations were built in such central locations in the city and cases of denominations crossing the aisle while their churches were being constructed to give them a place to worship and congregate in the meantime such as with the First Baptist Church which shared congregation space with the First Methodist in 1893 as their church was being built. Ultimately it shows that even if that had subtle differences in their interpretations or perspectives on their faith, they all had the same goals in who they were serving – their community, the Lord, and continuing to build and maintain their relationship with Christ and the Lord at the end of the day.

The decision by these early settlers to establish houses of worship near the civic center underscored the role of faith communities as central pillars in the formation of the city. Each denomination "planted" its roots—both symbolically and physically—around Central Avenue, creating a religious and architectural landscape that led directly to the city's lasting nickname: the "City of Churches." Today, that tradition continues, with dozens of active congregations across the city and new faith communities still being established, reflecting the ongoing importance of religious life in St. Petersburg's civic identity. Perhaps the largest growing church in the local Tampa Bay area which includes St. Petersburg, is Radiant Church, which was founded in 2013, it is a fast-growing, non-denominational church currently with 11 locations all across the bay area with a 12th location that was just announced. Radiant Church drew fewer than 200 guests in the early days, and it averaged nearly 8,000 members from their nine church locations at the time in 2024. In terms of this tradition continuing of churches being planted in this city, as recently as this year, NewSpring plans to plant Artisan City Church in St. Petersburg in 2025.

=== 20th century ===
St. Petersburg was incorporated as a city in June 1903. With this transition, the development of the downtown waterfront had dredging of a deeper shipping channel from 1906 to 1908 which opened St. Petersburg to larger shipping. Further dredging improved the port facilities through the 1910s. By then the city's population had quadrupled to a population of 4,127 citizens. F. A. Davis was instrumental to bringing the first trolley service in 1904.

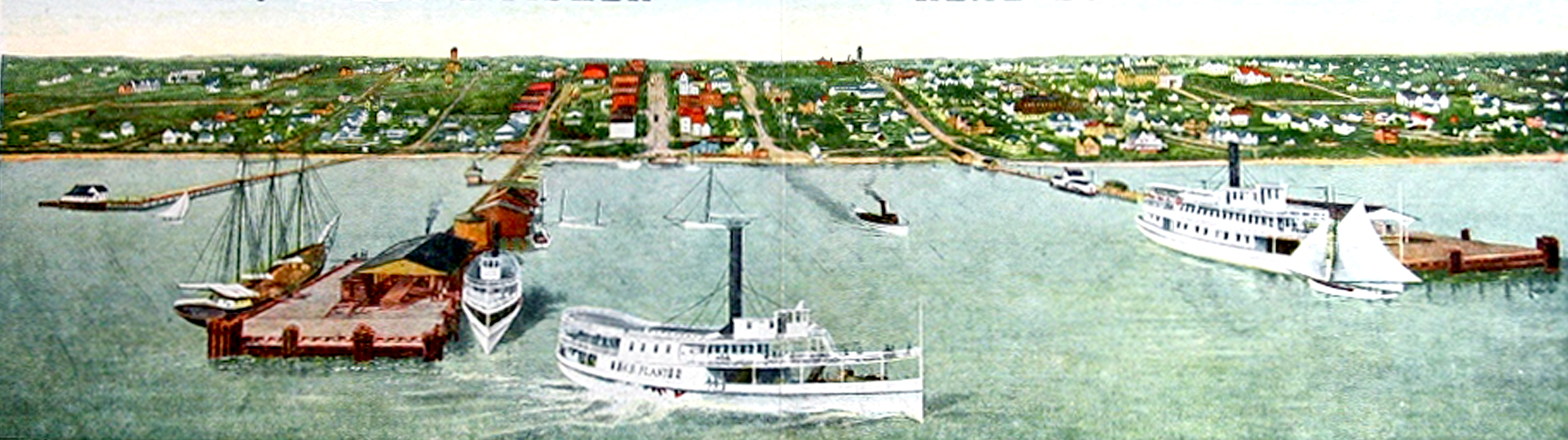
1906 postcard of painting by W.L. Straub of St. Petersburg

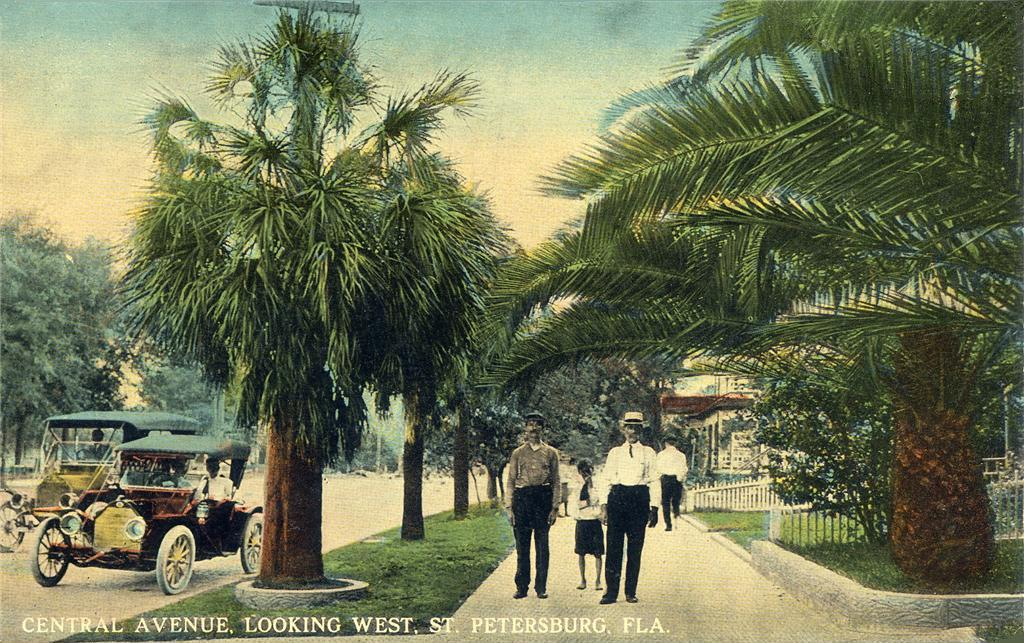
Central Avenue c. 1910

In 1914, Al Lang invited the St. Louis Browns to move their spring training into the city, then worked tirelessly to make Grapefruit League training in and around St. Petersburg the destination for baseball teams and their fans by the 1920s. Lang eventually became mayor and ambassador for the city, and helped its permanent population grow tenfold in just a decade.

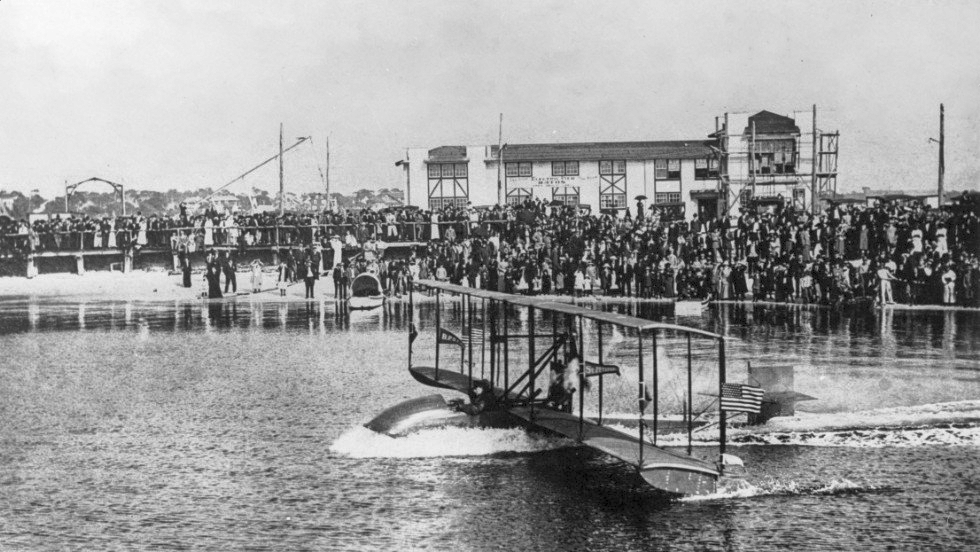
The Benoist XIV pictured taking off for the first time on January 1, 1914

In 1914 an airplane service across Tampa Bay from St. Petersburg to Tampa and back was initiated, generally considered the first scheduled commercial airline flight. The flight took former mayor Abe Pheil to Tampa. The company name was the St. Petersburg-Tampa Airboat Line, and the pilot was Tony Jannus flying a Benoist XIV flying boat. The Tony Jannus Award is presented annually for outstanding achievement in the airline industry.

St. Petersburg's first library opened on December 1, 1915, which still operates to this day as the Mirror Lake Library.

The city and its tourism industry burgeoned in the 1920s, with up to a quarter million visitors annually coming from Canada, the North and the Midwest by automobile, yacht, and railroad. The city was the principal Gulf Coast destination for long-distance trains of the Atlantic Coast Line Railroad's Southland (from Chicago and Cincinnati) and Gulf Coast Limited (from New York, succeeded by the West Coast Champion), and Seaboard Air Line Railroad trains such as the Southern States Special (from New York, succeeded by the Silver Meteor). Travel time from across the bay was cut due to the Gandy Bridge's opening in 1924, allowing direct access to Tampa and the rest of central Florida.

The city took on a Mediterranean flair, with Old Spanish Trail style architecture promoted by Snell Isle founder Perry Snell, whose new country club island homes adopted many elements of Moorish design. Those same elements were echoed in the city's new Vinoy, Jungle Country Club, Don Cesar and other fine hotels, as well as in Snell's new skyscraper office building downtown. The 1926 opening of the Million Dollar Pier marked the peak of the boom, adding an attraction that brought both tourists and townspeople together to enjoy fishing, amusements, trolley access and even a local radio station.

The St. Petersburg flag was created in 1927 and was designed by Mayor C.J. Maurer along with a committee of other public officials. It featured an array of colors symbolic of St. Pete's culture including the sunshine, water and land. The idea came after officials called for a new logo which later became the design for the flag. The pelican featured in the center became a symbol for the "Feed the Pelican Fund" which has supported the birds during the winter months.

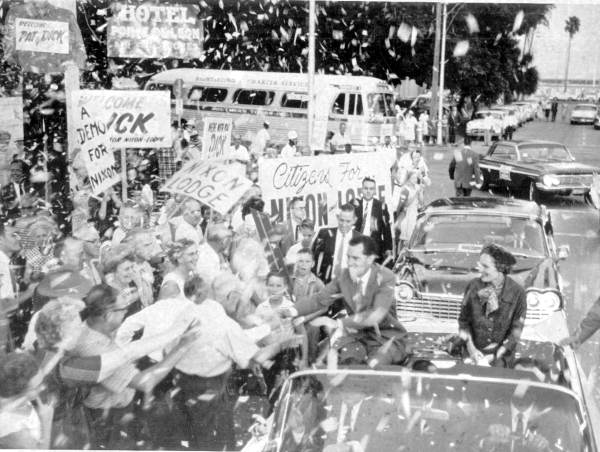
Richard Nixon campaign parade in St. Petersburg, October 18, 1960

Tourism declined by the late 1920s and early 1930s due to the Great Depression. The city recovered later in the 1930s with the help of the Public Works Administration, including a $10 million investment plan in 1939 which helped build the St. Petersburg City Hall.

St. Petersburg was a bit challenged as a city or rather had to make adaptations because it was mainly a tourist economy, and with the coming of World War II, that economy collapsed at first. It was only a few months after Pearl Harbor when the city's hotels and boardinghouses were barren. To quote historian Raymond Arsenault who experienced it firsthand, "Few cities felt the winds of war as early as St. Petersburg, and even fewer underwent such a thoroughgoing militarization." The local leaders paused and thought about what they could do to adapt to the situation at hand, for what could be done with the city's many hotels and the perks that came with? Then there was a lightbulb moment by someone to use St. Petersburg's extensive supply of hotels, cafeterias, recreational facilities and other amenities to generously give it to our armed services as a training site. Then an aggressive campaign led by the city's chamber of commerce, city officials and Congressman J. Harden Peterson convinced Washington that the ball was in their court. The War Department responded and selected St. Petersburg as a major technical services training center for the U.S. Army Air Corps. The city's Bayboro Harbor became a training base, The Vinoy Park Hotel was used as the headquarters, and every major hotel in the city was leased to the U.S. Air Corps except the Suwannee - for what little business remained for them was kept, and dozens of smaller hotels were leased as well. In addition to the army air corps, the Coast Guard, and the United States Maritime Service were trained in St. Petersburg also. By the time the training center was discontinued in July 1943, an estimated 120,000 troops had seen St. Petersburg as trainees and instructors. After the war, many of those troops who were stationed in St. Petersburg returned as residents or tourists.

In the 1950s, St. Petersburg experienced another population boom, with the return of retiree resettlement to the city. In 1954 the original Sunshine Skyway Bridge opened its first span to link St. Petersburg with Manatee County, connecting the next year to U.S. Route 19 in the city. With a large influx of car traffic, it was decided to remove the city's streetcar lines.

The development of major transportation continued into the 1960s with the completion of the Howard Frankland Bridge in 1960, creating another connection between St. Petersburg and Tampa. St. Petersburg also received its first stadium named the Bayfront Center which hosted the first professional hockey league in Tampa Bay. A new municipal marina and the Museum of Fine Arts were also built downtown. St. Petersburg is home to one of the world's largest reclaimed water systems that was built in the 1970s which flows 37 million gallons of water per day to provide for customers located throughout the city.

In 1984, a full-scale flying replica of the Benoist XIV flying boat was constructed by Florida Aviation Historical Society for the 70th anniversary of the flight. This aircraft is now on loan to the St. Petersburg Museum of History in St. Petersburg, Florida.

==== Segregation and civil rights ====
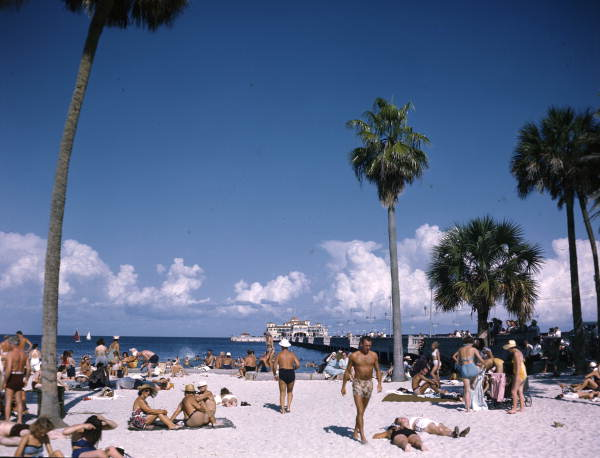
Segregated Spa Beach, in downtown St. Petersburg, 1954

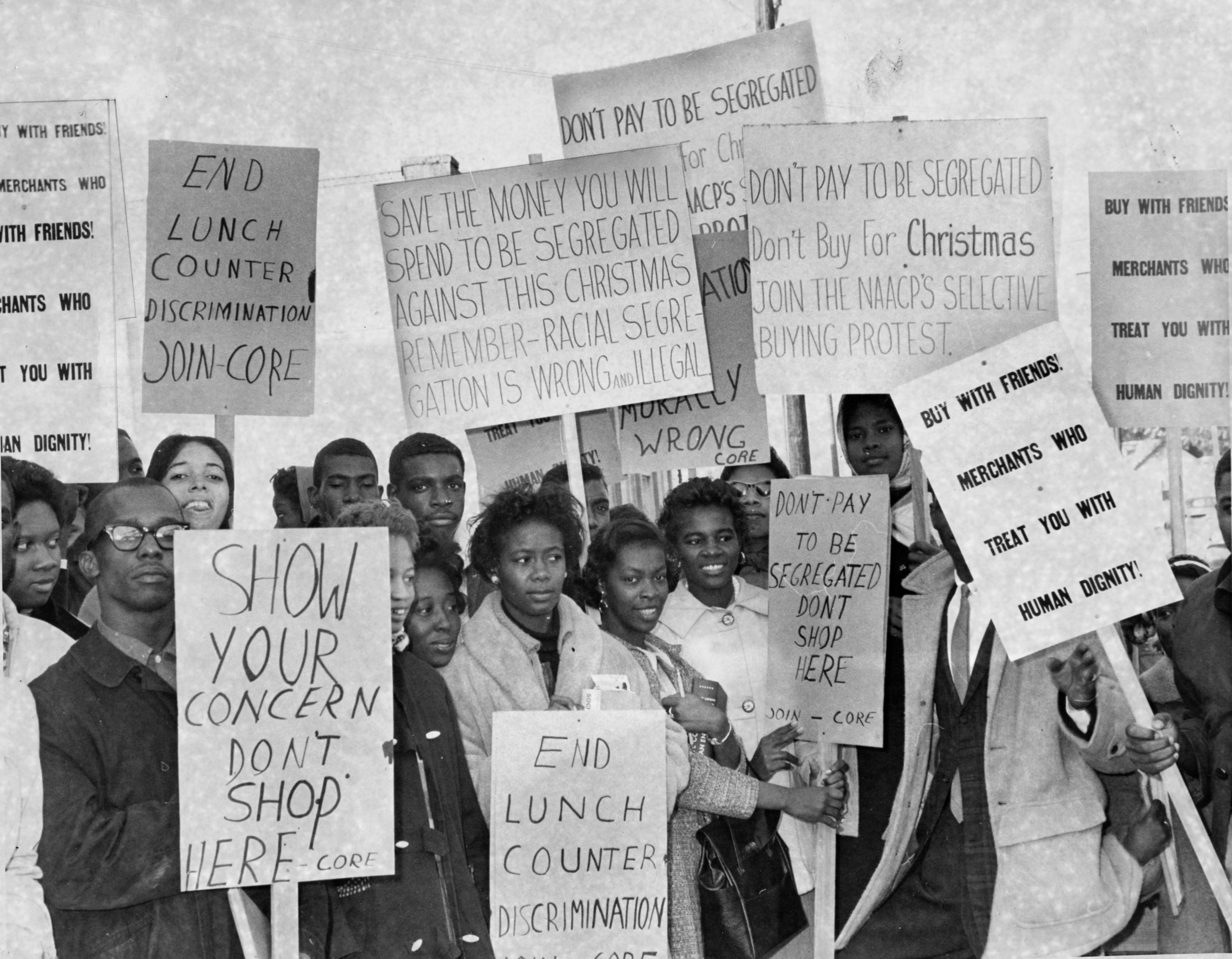
December 1960, people picket in front of local St. Petersburg businesses, in a movement sponsored by the NAACP. Tampa Bay Times.

Filmed footage
- Film of 1968 St.Pete Sanitation Workers' Strike

In 1887, only a few dirt paths led to St. Petersburg, on which African Americans made their way to St. Petersburg. Many gained employment building railways, and settled in an area known as Pepper Town, where residents grew pepper. The neighborhood existed into the 1960s, and became the first of several black neighborhoods to maintain Jim Crow laws and government regulations that drew boundaries around said African American neighborhoods. The first African American church was built in 1894. More African American neighborhoods, including Little Egypt, Sugar Hill, and Lincoln Court, were established around the Gas Plant, which developed its own business district. A hospital for African Americans was established in 1923. Segregation continued in these areas until the 1950s, when black leaders such as Robert Swain advocated for civil rights in St. Petersburg, and obtained building permits after threatening to sue the city for violating his civil rights.

In 1880, the city was 53% white people to 47% black people. The city publicly boasted the Ku Klux Klan klaverns' role in violence, and that they were "always on hand to help intimidate." Law enforcement would enforce racially based curfews. By the 1920s, St. Petersburg neighborhoods were segregated. In 1914, white residents lynched a black man suspected of murder and rape, and in 1905, after a black man knifed to death the city's police chief, a mob stormed the jail and "shot him to pieces." In 1914, John Evans was accused of beating and raping a white woman, and a crowd of 1,500 white residents dragged him from his jail cell and lynched him.

In 1944, the Army Service Forces feared race riots, and identified the location of black-owned newspapers and radio stations. Emergency orders were broadcast saying: "All liquor stores, bars, dance halls, moving picture theaters and public places, where people may congregate have been ordered closed. The streets have been ordered cleared...The congregation of more than three persons at any place is prohibited."

From 1955 to 1959, black residents organized swim-ins of the segregated beaches and pools. The St. Petersburg government responded by closing these venues and arresting participants. This continued up to and after the 1957 Alsup v. St. Petersburg ruling that St. Petersburg could not segregate beaches or pools. In 1959, after continued pressure from residents through swim-in's, the government reopened them as an integrated venues. In 1968, the city's mostly-black sanitation workers went on strike for higher wages. Integration began in the 1960s, which included restaurants serving black people, integrated washrooms, and blacks hired as bus drivers (1964) and police officers.

=== Contemporary history ===
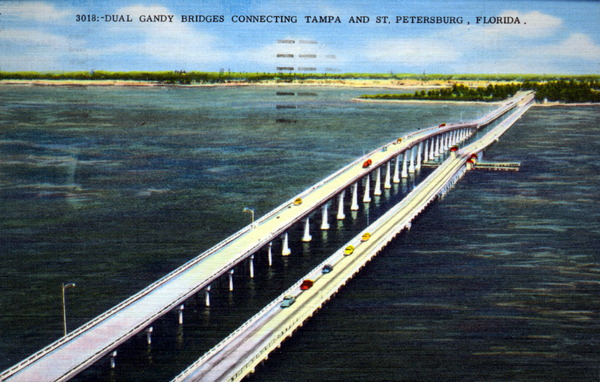
1969 postcard of the Gandy Bridge by the Hartman Litho Sales Company

Development of the first Major League Baseball team to be located in the Tampa Bay area began in St. Petersburg throughout the 1970s. The city tried to encourage numerous teams through the United States to make St. Petersburg their new home. Designs for a ballpark were first presented in 1983 and construction for a permanent dome stadium began in 1986. This process controversially required the demolition of the mostly-Black Gas Plant neighborhood. The stadium opened in 1990 as the Florida Suncoast Dome, renamed the Thunderdome in 1993. After many attempts to attract tenants to the new stadium, Major League Baseball gave St. Petersburg a franchise in 1995. In 1996, the dome was renamed a third time to Tropicana Field after naming rights were established with Tropicana Dole Beverages. The Tampa Bay Devil Rays was then established in 1998 after the stadium's renovation and the new team played their first game on March 31, 1998, giving the Tampa Bay area their first professional baseball team.

I-275 was expanded across the bay from Tampa through St. Petersburg in the 1970s. Additional spurs I-175 and I-375 were built afterward, extending from the main highway to the northern and southern edges of the downtown area. The city population continued to multiply during the 20th century, booming through the 1970s as a retirement destination for Americans from midwestern cities, reaching 238,647 in the 1980 census. Racial tensions persisted, and 1996 riots were sparked by the shooting of a black teenager by a white St. Pete police officer. Growth stagnated in the subsequent decade and a half, but since the Great Recession, renewed interest in urban living by family-aged residents and the expansion of the downtown university and related services has led to growth.

== Geography ==
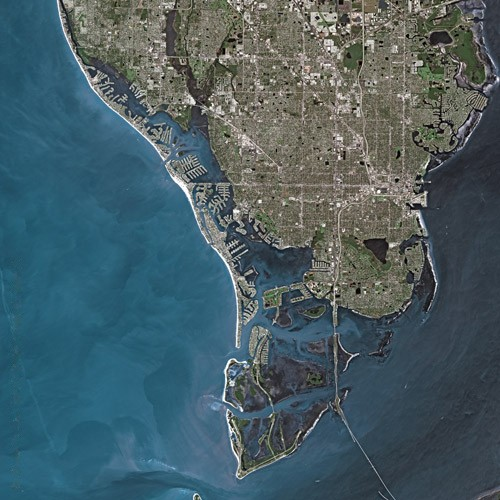
St. Petersburg seen from Spot satellite

=== Topography ===
According to the United States Census Bureau, the city has a total area of 137.6 square miles (356.4 km^{2}). 61.7 square miles (159.9 km^{2}) of it is land, and 75.9 square miles (196.5 km^{2}) of it (55.13%) is water. St. Petersburg is bordered by Tampa Bay's three sections, Old, Middle and Lower Tampa Bay.

=== Cityscape ===
View looking out to sea towards the North Yacht Basin from Bay Shore Drive

=== Neighborhoods ===
St. Petersburg is home to more than 100 neighborhoods, with most of the historic districts located near the bay. On the central Eastern edge of the city is Downtown St. Petersburg, which includes the city's residential and commercial skyscrapers, art galleries, museums, and parks.

The downtown area is home to the central business district and to many start-up companies, corporate branches, banks, law firms, and restaurants. Apart from downtown's business and cultural offerings, the area also includes a branch of St. Petersburg College and the campus of the University of South Florida-St. Petersburg. The downtown district is home to two professional sports teams, the Tampa Bay Rays, which play in the western part of downtown at Tropicana Field, and the Tampa Bay Rowdies, which play along the downtown waterfront at Al Lang Stadium. The emerging Edge district on the western edge of downtown is rapidly growing as development spreads down Central Avenue.

North of downtown lie the Historic Old Northeast and Snell Isle, which both have Mediterranean style historic and waterfront homes, parks, and recreational areas. Old Northeast is home to a shopping district, city landmarks, beaches, and small shops as well as small residential high rises. Snell Isle was founded by C. Perry Snell who bought up the land to develop upscale properties in the 1900s, and helped create some of St. Petersburg's resorts such as the Vinoy Park Hotel and the St. Petersburg Woman's Club, both of which are listed on the U.S. National Register of Historic Places. The far north consists of the Gateway area which overlaps part of Pinellas Park, home to major employers such as Home Shopping Network and currently the site of much construction of residential and business buildings and of new toll roads.

The central portion of St. Petersburg includes the Grand Central District and Historic Kenwood. The Grand Central District houses many of the city's cafes, art galleries, restaurants, and bars all owing to the Craftsman style architecture. Historic Kenwood is filled with art studios and galleries similarly to the Grand Central District.

South of downtown is Historic Roser Park, which houses historic Mediterranean and Eclectic style housing, parks, and museums. The neighborhood is divided by Booker Creek which flows into Bayboro Harbor.

In far western St. Petersburg, north of the separate city of South Pasadena, Florida, is the neighborhood of Pasadena, which includes the intersection of State Road 693 (Pasadena Avenue) and County Road 150 (Central Avenue).

==== Downtown ====
Downtown St. Petersburg is the Central Business District, containing high rises for office and residential use. The Tampa Bay Times newspaper is headquartered in the downtown area. The Poynter Institute, which owns the paper, is located on 3rd Street South.

The Mahaffey Theater complex, the Morean Arts Center, dozens of other art galleries, The Coliseum, Palladium Theatre, and Jannus Live are among the galleries and cultural venues featured downtown. Several prominent museums are located in the perimeter. Many of them have received notable accolades, including the Chihuly Collection presented by the Morean Arts Center, the Museum of Fine Arts, the Salvador Dalí Museum, the now-closed Florida International Museum, the St. Petersburg Museum of History, Florida Holocaust Museum, and the James Museum of Western and Wildlife Art. The city hosts many outdoor festivals throughout the year.

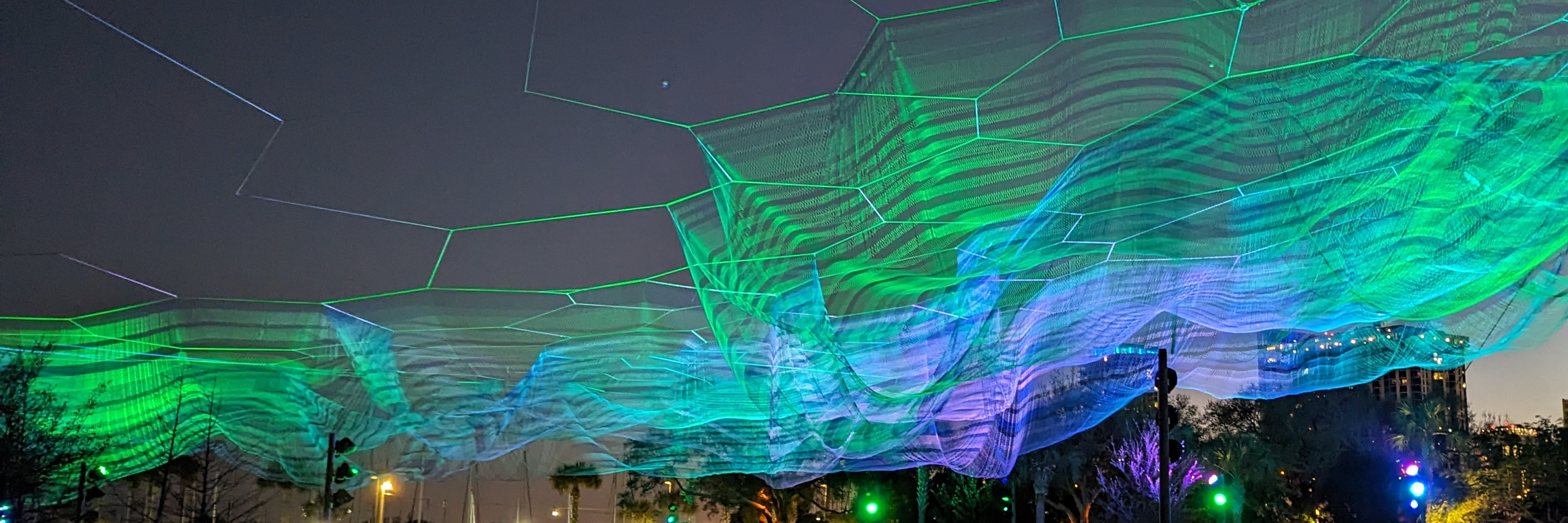
Bending Arc Sculpture in 2024 by Janet Echelman

Jutting a half mile into the bay is the St. Petersburg Pier, a major tourist attraction that offers various activities. "The Lens" design which was chosen by the International Design Competition Jury and accepted by City Council later had its contract terminated by a citywide election during the summer of 2013. Following this, the "Pier Park" was chosen out of the 16 new design teams that submitted work in late 2014 and in 2015 the Pier Park was set for construction in early 2017. The new Pier District opened on July 6, 2020, and contains green space, the Marketplace, playground, splash pad, and several public art installations, including Janet Echelman's aerial net sculpture, Bending Arc.

Downtown also contains the University of South Florida St. Petersburg and a downtown branch of St. Petersburg College. The downtown perimeter includes several parks, most of which are waterfront or lakefront. Straub Park is nearly a half mile long, boasts a waterfront location, and is home of the St. Petersburg Museum of Fine Arts. Because of the number of parks in the downtown area, The Trust for Public Land ranks St. Petersburg 1st in Florida and 15th out of 100 of the largest cities in the U.S. The Vinoy Park Hotel has a bayfront location, a spot on the National Register of Historic Places, and an AAA Four-Diamond rating. It fronts Vinoy Park, which holds music festivals, including the Warped Tour. Nearby is the historic Tramor Cafeteria building, now part of the Tampa Bay Times. The city is connected via the Looper Trolley.

Many dining and nightlife locations can be found downtown on or near Central Avenue extending to 34th Street in the west or Beach Drive along the waterfront. Venues include Jannus Live and the State Theatre. The active nightlife scene is credited to recent demographic and regulatory changes. In 2010, the city council voted to extend bar hours until 3 A.M., identical to cross-bay "rival" Tampa.

Tropicana Field, home of Major League Baseball's Tampa Bay Rays, is located in the western part of downtown. Until 2008, the team played its spring training games at nearby Progress Energy Park. This setup was unique, making St. Petersburg the first city that played host to its baseball team during spring training as well as the regular season since the 1919 Philadelphia Athletics. At the end of 2007, there was a debate over a new stadium to be built on the downtown waterfront at the current Progress Energy Park site. Tropicana Field would be demolished and replaced with prime residential and retail space. Completion of the stadium was planned for 2012; however, the proposal was tabled indefinitely while a community-based organization investigates all alternatives for new stadium construction. In 2022, the Rays organization and the city came to an agreement over redevelopment; the Trop will be demolished by 2027, to be replaced by a new stadium and a restored Gas Plant neighborhood surrounding it. Although originally set to expire in 2027, the Rays use agreement for Tropicana Field was extended until 2028 due to the damage caused by Hurricane Milton in 2024 and will continue to be extended every year the field remains unplayable. Previous plans to move forward with the construction of a new stadium in St. Petersburg's Historic Gas Plant District have since been scrapped, with the Rays stepping away from the deal. The repairs to Tropicana field have been estimated to cost upwards of $55 million and the city aims to have them completed in time for the 2026 season.

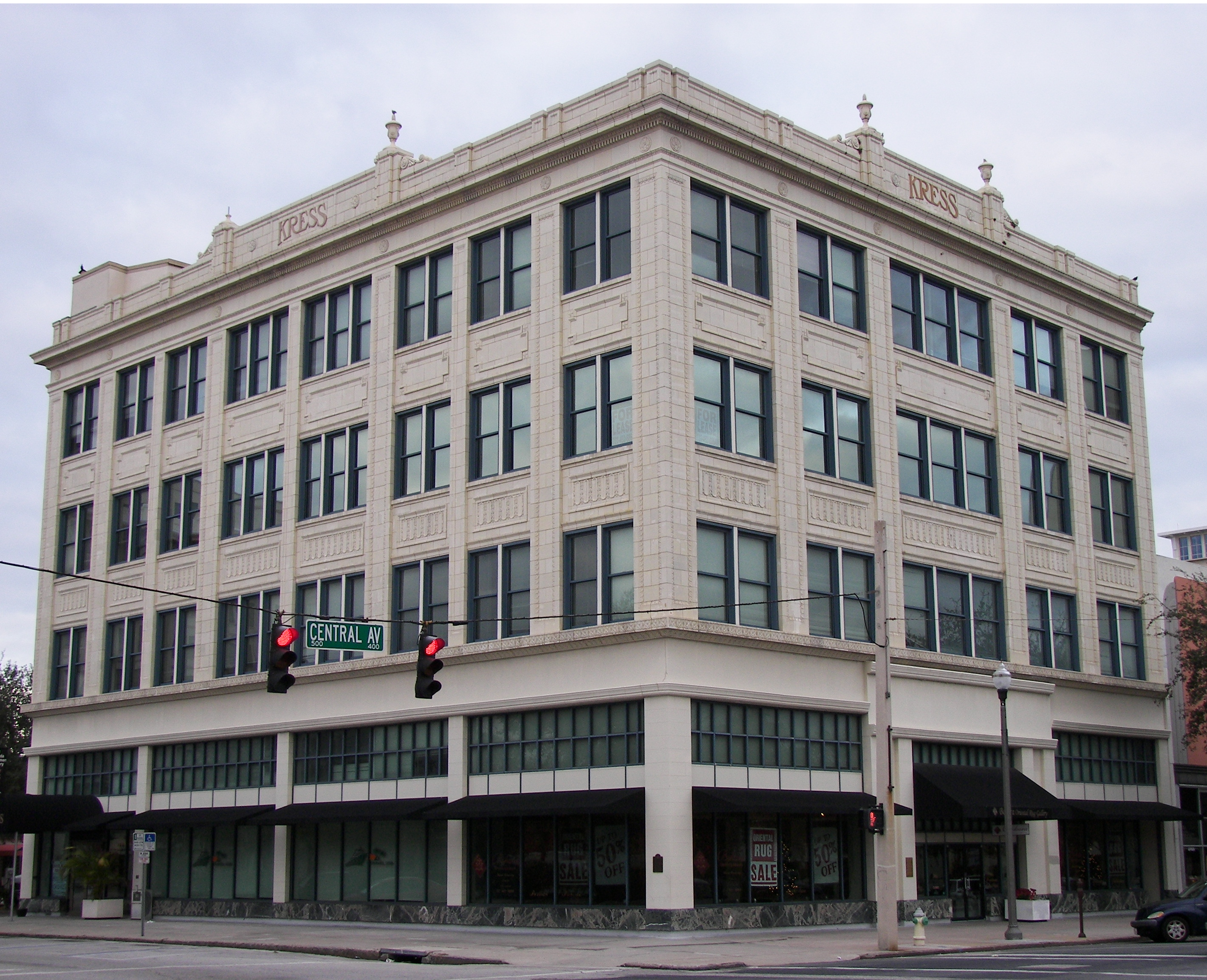
The S. H. Kress and Co. Building is on the National Register of Historic Places.

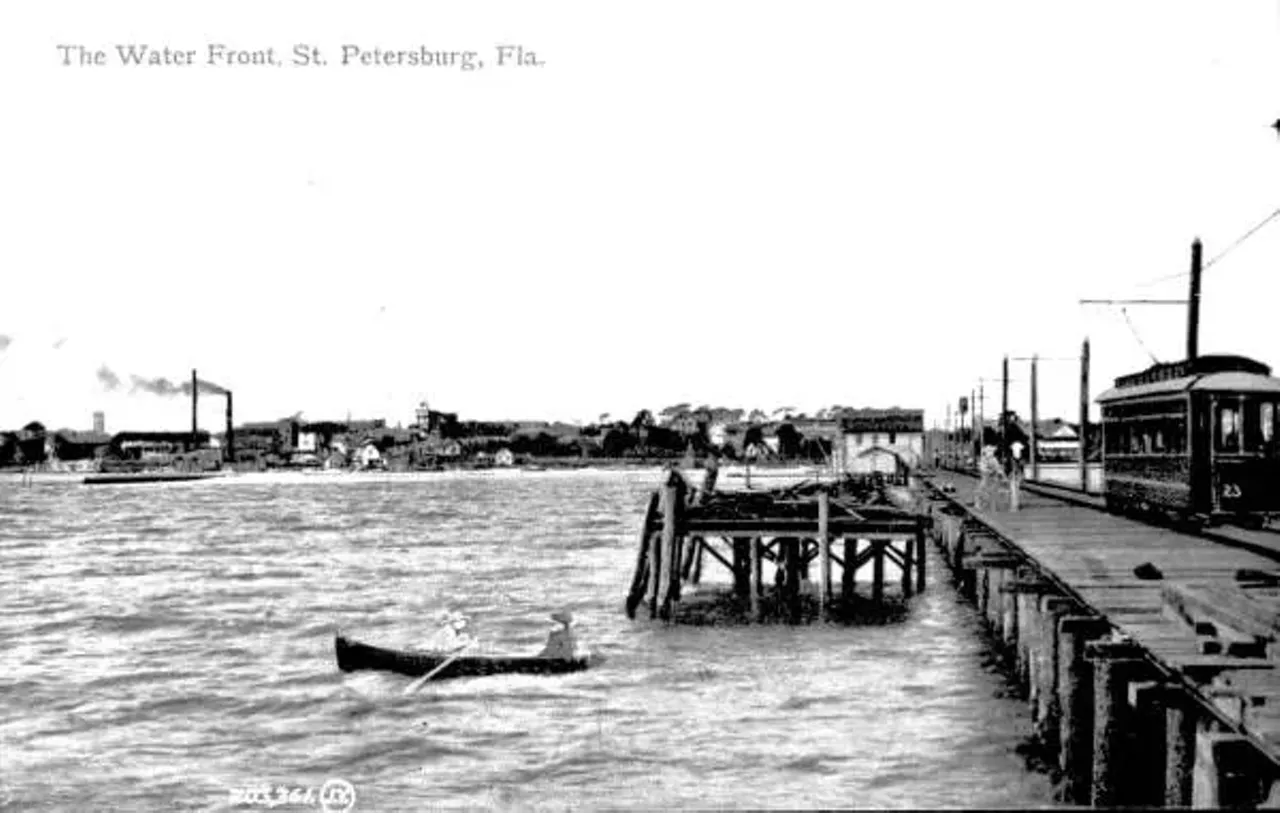
The waterfront and Electric Pier - Saint Petersburg, Florida, circa 1910.

St. Petersburg has the third-largest dedicated public waterfront park system in North America, with a waterfront park system that stretches 7 miles (11 km) and is used year-round for public events, festivals and other activities. In the early 20th century, citizens and city leaders engaged in a long and boisterous debate over the future of the young city's waterfront space, with one side advocating for commercial, port and industrial development and the other side advocating for a long-term commitment to parks and public access to the waterfront. It was during the earliest days of the St. Petersburg Chamber of Commerce in 1908, that their committee at the time, investigated and reported that "The piers, all sorts of riff-raff, and especially where the outgoing tide leaves large stretches of sand covered with a variety of animal and vegetable matter in all stages of decay - does not well comport with a live, progressive city such as St. Petersburg aspires and claims to be." One of the chamber of commerce's many purposes is to serve as a collective voice for its local business members - with the overarching goal of helping them thrive, and one of the biggest roles the chamber has is promoting tourism too, which ultimately brings their city's business more visitors and money to the economy. For those reasons, when the St. Petersburg Chamber of Commerce heard that the waterfront could have a stigma attached to it - that was bad news to be hearing, for it meant it could be negatively impacting the city surrounding it. The committee urged the board of the chamber to take action by convincing the city officials to follow their plan that would lead them to plead into striking a deal with those who owned the waterfront lots at the time, and to acquire whatever remained of other necessary, relevant properties. The public access and park contingent won the debate when, on Christmas Eve 1909, the city announced the acquisition of the waterfront land that is encompassed by the waterfront park system. From the beginning of the St. Petersburg Chamber of Commerce's inception until even today, the chamber has made it clear the importance of the public access, upkeep, maintenance, expansion plans, and passion for their city's waterfront. Today the chamber has a Downtown Waterfront Committee, which has quarterly meetings involving public and private entities. Anyone can RSVP to be a part of this committee, and recommendations made during these meetings often go to the chambers board of directors meetings.

The city is also becoming one of the largest destinations in Florida for kiteboarding with locations such as Fort De Soto Park, Pass-a-Grille, and Ten-Cent.

The St. Petersburg Shuffleboard Club was established in 1924 and gained attention as the "World's Largest Shuffleboard Club" with 110 courts and over 5,000 members in the 1950s and 1960s.

Northshore Aquatic Complex is a public pool and small water park located downtown on the St. Petersburg waterfront. Northshore contains a 50-meter pool with diving board, 25 meter training pool with zero depth entry, a play pool, and is home to both Saint Petersburg Aquatics swim club and Saint Petersburg Masters swim club.

=== Climate ===
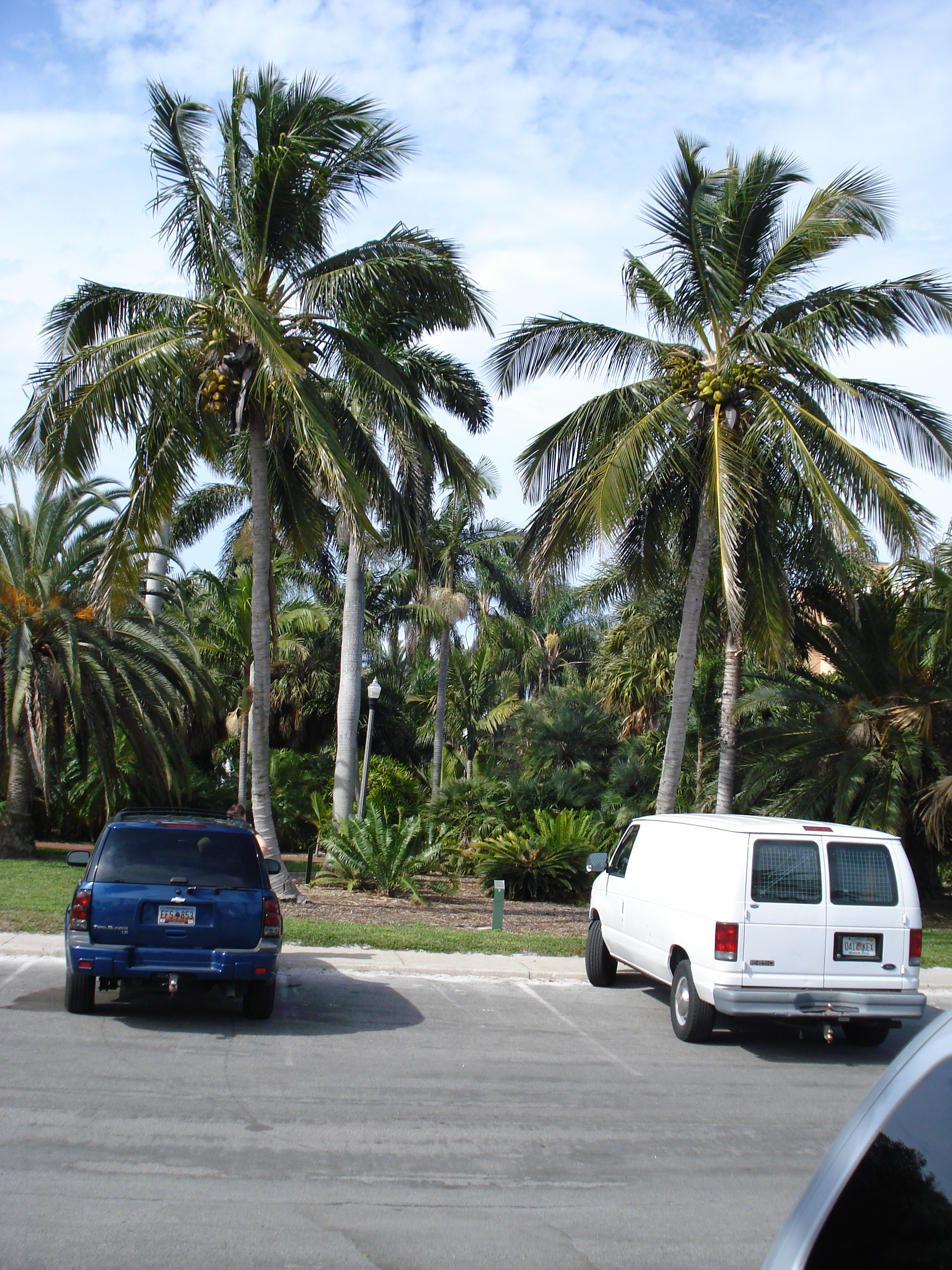
Coconut palms at the Gizella Kopsick Palm Arboretum in the northeastern part of the city

St. Petersburg has a humid subtropical climate (Köppen Cfa) with some characteristics of a tropical monsoon climate (Am), with a defined rainy season from June through September. Many portions of St. Petersburg, especially along the bay and in south St. Petersburg, have tropical microclimates due to the maritime influence of the Gulf of Mexico and Tampa Bay. As a result, tropical flora like coconut palms and royal palms can be found throughout the city, and the city is home to the Gizella Kopsick Palm Arboretum, a 2-acre (0.81 ha) park which houses over 500 palms and cycads, including a pair of large Jamaican Tall coconut palms which predate the freeze of 1989. St. Petersburg, like the rest of the Tampa Bay area, is occasionally affected by tropical storms and hurricanes. There were 2 hurricanes in 2024 that impacted St. Petersburg within 2 weeks of each other: Hurricane Helene followed by Hurricane Milton. However, both made landfall in other regions of the state (the Big Bend and Southwest Florida, respectively). The last time a hurricane directly struck the city was in 1921.

Climate data for St. Petersburg, Florida, 1991–2020 normals, extremes 1892-present
Month	Jan	Feb	Mar	Apr	May	Jun	Jul	Aug	Sep	Oct	Nov	Dec	Year
Record high °F (°C)	86 (30)	86 (30)	89 (32)	92 (33)	96 (36)	99 (37)	100 (38)	98 (37)	96 (36)	94 (34)	89 (32)	88 (31)	100 (38)
Mean maximum °F (°C)	80.0 (26.7)	81.0 (27.2)	84.0 (28.9)	88.0 (31.1)	92.0 (33.3)	94.0 (34.4)	95.0 (35.0)	94.0 (34.4)	93.0 (33.9)	90.0 (32.2)	85.0 (29.4)	81.0 (27.2)	95.0 (35.0)
Mean daily maximum °F (°C)	69.8 (21.0)	72.7 (22.6)	76.5 (24.7)	81.6 (27.6)	86.7 (30.4)	89.8 (32.1)	90.9 (32.7)	90.8 (32.7)	89.1 (31.7)	84.3 (29.1)	77.2 (25.1)	72.2 (22.3)	81.8 (27.7)
Daily mean °F (°C)	62.1 (16.7)	64.7 (18.2)	68.7 (20.4)	73.9 (23.3)	79.3 (26.3)	82.9 (28.3)	83.9 (28.8)	84.0 (28.9)	82.4 (28.0)	77.2 (25.1)	70.0 (21.1)	64.9 (18.3)	74.5 (23.6)
Mean daily minimum °F (°C)	54.3 (12.4)	56.6 (13.7)	60.9 (16.1)	66.3 (19.1)	71.9 (22.2)	75.9 (24.4)	76.9 (24.9)	77.1 (25.1)	75.7 (24.3)	70.0 (21.1)	62.7 (17.1)	57.6 (14.2)	67.2 (19.6)
Mean minimum °F (°C)	40.0 (4.4)	46.0 (7.8)	51.0 (10.6)	58.0 (14.4)	67.0 (19.4)	72.0 (22.2)	74.0 (23.3)	74.0 (23.3)	72.0 (22.2)	62.0 (16.7)	52.0 (11.1)	46.0 (7.8)	39.0 (3.9)
Record low °F (°C)	27 (−3)	28 (−2)	30 (−1)	45 (7)	54 (12)	61 (16)	63 (17)	66 (19)	61 (16)	46 (8)	35 (2)	22 (−6)	22 (−6)
Average precipitation inches (mm)	2.97 (75)	2.17 (55)	2.86 (73)	2.60 (66)	2.54 (65)	7.18 (182)	8.35 (212)	9.33 (237)	7.51 (191)	2.52 (64)	1.61 (41)	2.84 (72)	52.48 (1,333)
Average precipitation days (≥ 0.01 in)	7.0	5.9	6.5	4.9	4.9	11.5	14.5	15.3	13.5	6.4	4.4	6.0	100.8
Source: NOAA

=== Climate and sustainability initiatives ===
The city adopted an Integrated Sustainability Action Plan in 2019, designed to help the city adopt sustainable practices.

== Demographics ==
Historical population
Census	Pop.	Note	%±
1890	273		—
1900	1,575		476.9%
1910	4,127		162.0%
1920	14,237		245.0%
1930	40,425		183.9%
1940	60,812		50.4%
1950	96,738		59.1%
1960	181,298		87.4%
1970	216,159		19.2%
1980	238,647		10.4%
1990	238,629		0.0%
2000	248,232		4.0%
2010	244,769		−1.4%
2020	258,308		5.5%
2025 (est.)	264,033	▲	2.2%
U.S. Decennial Census

=== Racial and ethnic composition ===
St. Petersburg city, Florida – Racial and ethnic composition Note: the US Census treats Hispanic/Latino as an ethnic category. This table excludes Latinos from the racial categories and assigns them to a separate category. Hispanics/Latinos may be of any race.
Race / Ethnicity (NH = Non-Hispanic)	Pop 2000	Pop 2010	Pop 2020	% 2000	% 2010	% 2020
White (NH)	170,396	157,409	159,792	68.64%	64.31%	61.86%
Black or African American (NH)	54,884	57,489	53,345	22.11%	23.49%	20.65%
Native American or Alaska Native (NH)	684	567	520	0.28%	0.23%	0.20%
Asian (NH)	6,569	7,672	8,942	2.65%	3.13%	3.46%
Native Hawaiian or Pacific Islander alone (NH)	110	106	121	0.04%	0.04%	0.05%
Other race alone (NH)	550	539	1,441	0.22%	0.22%	0.56%
Mixed race or Multiracial (NH)	4,537	4,773	10,858	1.83%	1.95%	4.20%
Hispanic or Latino (any race)	10,502	16,214	23,289	4.23%	6.62%	9.02%
Total	248,232	244,769	258,308	100.00%	100.00%	100.00%

=== 2020 census ===
As of the 2020 United States census, there were 258,308 people, 111,957 households, and 59,448 families residing in the city.

=== 2010 census ===
As of the 2010 United States census, there were 244,769 people, 106,755 households, and 58,353 families residing in the city.

In 2010, of all Asian residents, 0.8% were Vietnamese, 0.5% were Filipino, 0.5% were Indian, 0.3% were Chinese, 0.1% were Korean, 0.1% were Japanese, and 1.0% were other Asians. Also in 2010, of all Hispanic or Latino people within the city, 5,272 (2.2%) were Puerto Rican, 2,855 (1.2%) were Mexican, 2,835 (1.2%) were Cuban, and other Hispanic or Latino residents made up 5,252 (2.1%) of the population.

According to the 2010 census, the city population density was 3,964.4 inhabitants per square mile (1,530.7/km^{2}). 84.1% of households were occupied while 15.9% were not occupied. 3,888 (1.6%) lived in non-institutionalized group-quarters and 2,719 (1.1%) were institutionalized. As of 2010, 23,304 (21.4%) had children under the age of 18 living in them, 37,847 (34.8%) were opposite-sex married couples living together, 16,425 (15.1%) had a female householder with no husband present, 4,849 (4.5%) had a male householder with no wife present. There were 9,453 (3.9%) unmarried partnerships. 39,397 households (36.2%) were made up of individuals, and 28,267 (26.0%) had someone living alone who was 65 years of age or older. The average household size was 2.19. In 2010, families made up 54.3% while non-families made up 45.7%; the average family size was 2.88. The median age of the city was 41.6 years.

=== Languages ===
As of 2000, those who spoke only English as a first language at home accounted were 88.53% of residents, while Spanish was spoken by 4.43%, German by 0.78%, French by 0.72% of speakers, Vietnamese by 0.67%, Serbo-Croatian by 0.52%, and Laotian by 0.51% of the population.

=== Crime ===
As of 2012, it ranked 58th highest in the United States when it comes to violent crime. In 2013, St. Petersburg ranks in the bottom tenth for safety among cities in Florida. Evidence of the social unrest and the schism within the city, particularly between South St. Petersburg and the rest of the city came with the St. Petersburg, Florida riots of 1996. Police Officer David Crawford was murdered in February 2011 by then-teenager Nicholas Lindsey.

=== Religion ===
As of 2020, 35.9% of St. Petersburg residents consider themselves religious. Catholics make up the largest group at 14 percent followed by Methodists and Baptists, each of which compose of about four percent of the religious community. The Diocese of St. Petersburg governs 74 Catholic parishes as well as 46 schools and 480,000 Catholics in the Tampa Bay area. Bishop Gregory Parkes currently leads the Diocese of St. Petersburg which covers five counties in the state of Florida.

== Economy ==
Much economic activity is concentrated in the Gateway area, which overlaps St. Petersburg and Pinellas Park. The median household income is $55,134. Health care, retail and professional services are the largest industries. The most common positions in St. Petersburg are Office and Administrative Support, Sales, and Management.

=== Largest employers ===
According to the City of St. Petersburg, Florida's 2019 Comprehensive Annual Financial Report, the largest private-sector (non-government, non-school) employers in the city are (with trends since 2010):

#	Employer	Industry	Employees
1	Raymond James	Investment	4,700 ▲
2 ▲	Johns Hopkins All Children's Hospital	Healthcare	3,700 ▲
3	Home Shopping Network	Retail	2,200 ▼
4 ▲	St. Anthony's Hospital	Healthcare	2,100 ▲
5 ▲	Publix Super Markets	Retail	2,000 ▲
6 ▲	Jabil Inc.	Electronics manufacturing services	2,000 ▲
7 ▼	Fidelity National Information Services	Financial sector	1,800
8 ▼	Bayfront Medical	Healthcare	1,500 ▼
9 ▲	The Continental Group	Realtor	1,200 ▲
10 ▼	Spectrum	Communications	1,100 ▼

=== Budget ===
As of fiscal year 2024, the city of St. Petersburg had a total operating budget of $823 million, not including dependent districts and internal service funds.

The Commercial Revitalization Program of 2020 provided grants to commercial developments providing future work to the city. Grants are provided to commercial buildings and developments outside of downtown and are provided as matching grants.

== Art and culture ==
Museums and cultural centers include the Salvador Dalí Museum, the Chihuly Collection, Museum of Fine Arts, St. Petersburg, and the Museum of the American Arts and Crafts Movement.

St. Petersburg includes more than 75 art galleries and seven distinct art districts. The Warehouse Arts District emerged circa 2009 alongside a significant glass art market that has become known as "the Glass Coast". The Deuces Live District is home to the city of St. Petersburg's African American cultural heritage, and includes locally owned art galleries and other specialty businesses, as well as historic buildings such as the Royal Theater. The M.L. King North District includes restaurants and cafes.

St. Petersburg features more than 600 public art murals, which are the focus of the city's annual SHINE Mural Festival. Since its inception in 2015, the SHINE Mural Festival has been responsible for creating more than 150 murals in the city. Other notable art fairs in the city include the long running St. Petersburg Fine Art Festival and the Mainsail Art Festival.

=== Events ===
One of the first of many major events of the year that takes place is the Dr. Martin Luther King Jr. Parade, in January. The parade hosts a Battle of the Bands, and drum line extravaganzas that have been duplicated in other cities.

In March the city hosts the annual Firestone Grand Prix of St. Petersburg. This is located in downtown St. Petersburg and is the first round of the IndyCar Series. It usually lasts three days with practice rounds, qualifications, and two main races. The 100 lap Grand Prix's circuit has included a section of the Albert Whitted Airport.

Bluesfest, hosted in the Vinoy Park, hosts multiple live blues artists, offers views of the Tampa Bay waters from the park, and provides drinks and free food.

One of the many art festivals, called the Mainsail Art Festival, is a free entry art exhibition at the Vinoy Park, which offers art sold by local artists. It also provides live music, awards, and food courts.

The Saint Petersburg Art Festival takes place every February.

The downtown triathlon event is hosted by St. Anthony's Hospital and involves a 1.5k swim through Tampa Bay, a 40k bike along the waterways, and a 10k run through the neighborhoods.

The Green Thumb Festival, which originated in 1986 to promote tree beautification and planting in the city of St. Petersburg, is currently held in Walter Fuller Park.

A major event that takes place in June is the St. Pete Pride weekend, when the LGBT community and supporters celebrate in the streets with festivals, the 27/82 concert, and an LGBT pride parade. The weekend also hosts a variety of block parties, food stands, DJ stands, art festivals, local hosted parties, and the LGBT welcoming center.

In July, the 4th of July firework celebration invites the citizens to downtown St. Petersburg.

Greenhouse and USF St. Pete's College of Business host an annual event known as "St. Pete Pitch Night" in October that hosts judges and business pitches.

In November, the annual Ribfest is held at Vinoy Park. It includes family fun zones, drinking vendors, and two stages hosting many country music artists.

SHINE St. Pete Mural Festival is an annual event hosted by the St. Petersburg Arts Alliance. The event began in 2015 and since has contributed to nearly 93 murals designed by artists from across the globe. 2020 marked the first event entirely composed of Florida-based artists, more specifically from the Tampa Bay area.

From the end of November through December are holiday events. A tree lighting ceremony starts the celebrations. The Santa Parade is followed by Snowfest with "glice" skating, toboggan slides, and Kiddyland. Kids meet Santa and ice skate in the North Straub Park. North and South Straub Park are decorated with holiday lights and decorations while the Vinoy Park is decorated with large greeting cards created by the recreational centers in St. Petersburg.

In mid-December, the city hosts an annual NCAA football game in Tropicana Field entitled the St. Petersburg Bowl.

On December 31, St. Petersburg has the year's last event, First Night St. Petersburg, where people celebrate the arts from venues across the city.

The American Stage in the Park hosts many different shows at the Demens Landing Park throughout the year.

St. Petersburg hosted the Miss Florida Pageant eleven consecutive years from 2004 to 2015, until the pageant was moved to Lakeland.

The city hosts a year-round event known as the "Second Saturday ArtWalk".

The city hosted the 2024 Royal Rumble on January 27, 2024, on the Tropicana Field

=== Tourism ===
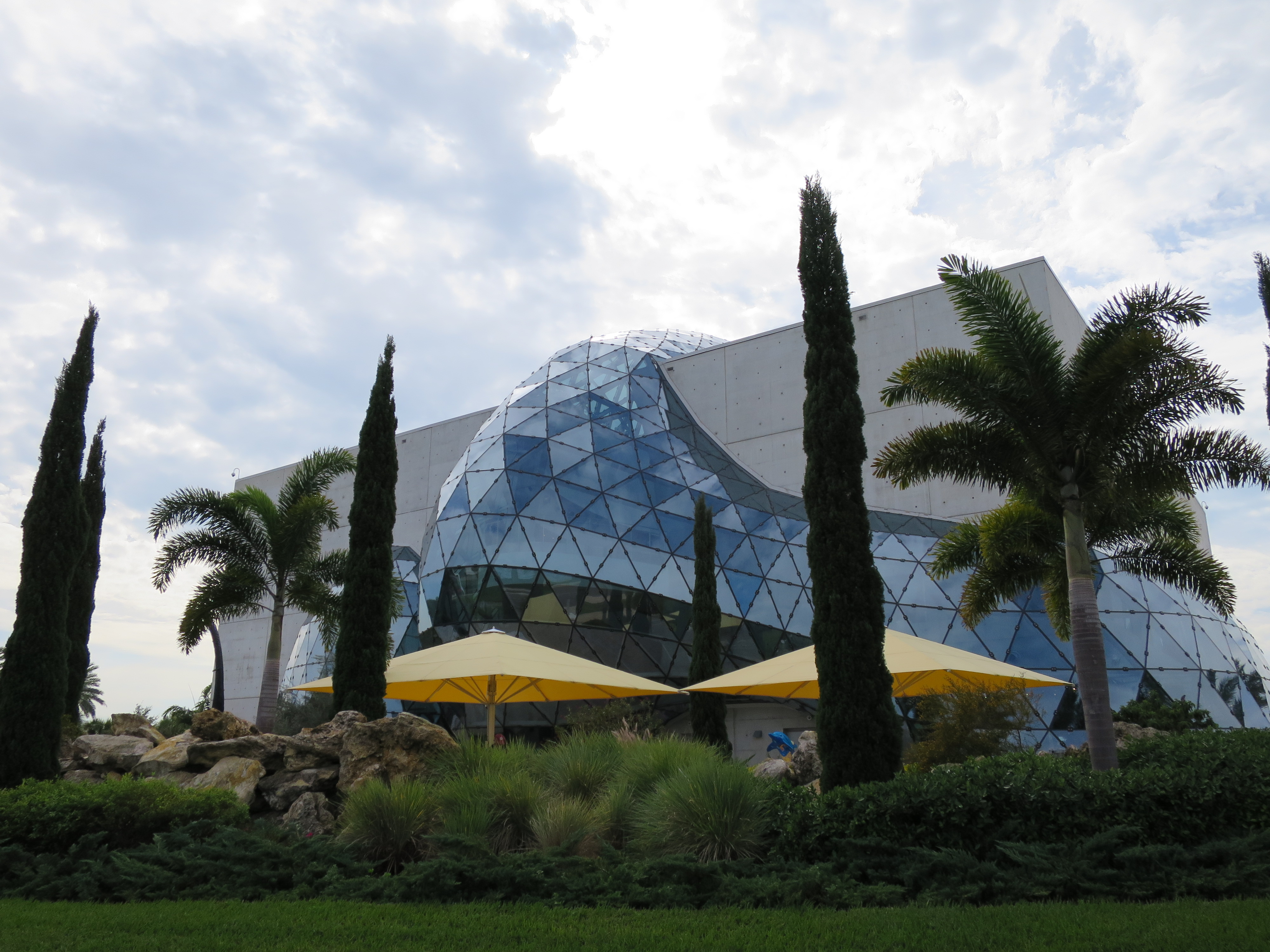
The Salvador Dalí Museum

The arts are a major contributor to the region's tourism. The Salvador Dalí Museum houses the largest collection of Dalí's works outside of Europe, including a number of famous and large-scale paintings such as The Discovery of America by Christopher Columbus. The Salvador Dalí Museum received more than 400,000 visitors annually prior to the COVID-19 pandemic, 75% of which were not local to the Tampa Bay Area. Other art museums in the city include a Museum of Fine Arts and The Chihuly Collection, located on Central Avenue, which houses glass sculptures of Dale Chihuly. The Museum of the American Arts and Crafts Movement was expected to open in 2017, and after delays opened to the public in September 2021.

Beyond the arts, St. Petersburg is home to a children's museum (Great Explorations), Holocaust Museum, as well as the Dr. Carter G. Woodson African American Museum which highlights the life of Carter G. Woodson who founded the Associated Publishers and is the author of nearly 30 books still prevalent today. Past exhibits and events featured in the museum include the Ray McLendon Exhibit, a discussion of race and politics series, and a seminar on the conviction of Michael Morgan. The St. Petersburg Museum of History has a full-size replica of the Benoist XIV seaplane and is located near the approximate spot by the St. Petersburg Pier where the first scheduled commercial flight departed.

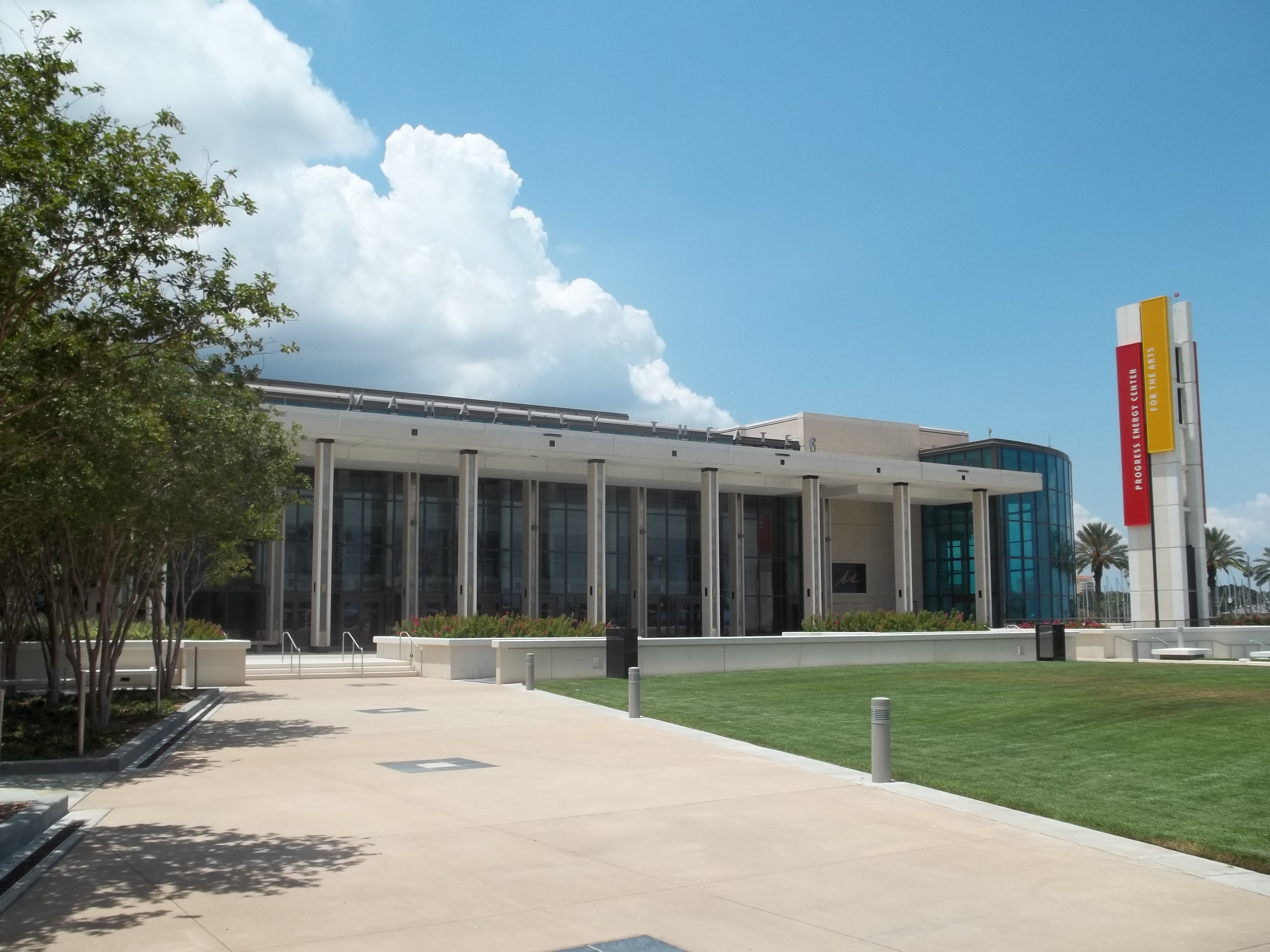
The Mahaffey Theater is one of St. Petersburg's popular tourism spots.

There are various other smaller art galleries and entertainment venues, especially in the downtown area, which has seen a boom in development since the mid-1990s; these include the Mahaffey Theater complex, American Stage (an equity regional theater), The Coliseum, Palladium Theatre, the Arts Center, and the Florida Craftsmen Gallery.

The old St. Petersburg Pier was a popular tourist attraction which closed in May 2013, and has been replaced with a new pier that opened in late 2020. The Bounty, a replica of HMS Bounty that was used in the 1962 Technicolor remake of Mutiny on the Bounty, starring Marlon Brando, was permanently docked near the pier for many years until the ship was sold to Ted Turner in 1986. The Bounty, however, sometimes visited St. Petersburg for the winter in the following years before its sinking in 2012. In 2010, the St. Petersburg City Council voted to demolish and rebuild the pier. The new pier will be opening "in phases" in 2020. A ceremony celebrating the opening is scheduled for 4 July.

The city had a Madame Tussaud Wax Museum between 1963 and 1989.

The downtown Sundial shopping complex opened in May 2014, sitting on the renovated site of a shopping and entertainment complex formerly called BayWalk that originally opened in 2000. It contains a 12-screen movie theater originally owned by Muvico and now owned by AMC Theatres, as well as many chain restaurants and retail shops. The Sundial St. Pete has nightlife destinations, as does the block surrounding Jannus Live. Restaurants serving ethnic and domestic culinary specialties can be found throughout the downtown area.

Every Saturday morning from October to May, the downtown area hosts a farmers' market – The Saturday Morning Market – in the parking area of Al Lang Stadium (formerly Progress Energy Park). In the summer months, the market moves to Williams Park to take advantage of the shade and create a more comfortable experience. Local vendors sell the fruits of their labors (whether edible or decorative) alongside artists of all kinds including live music.

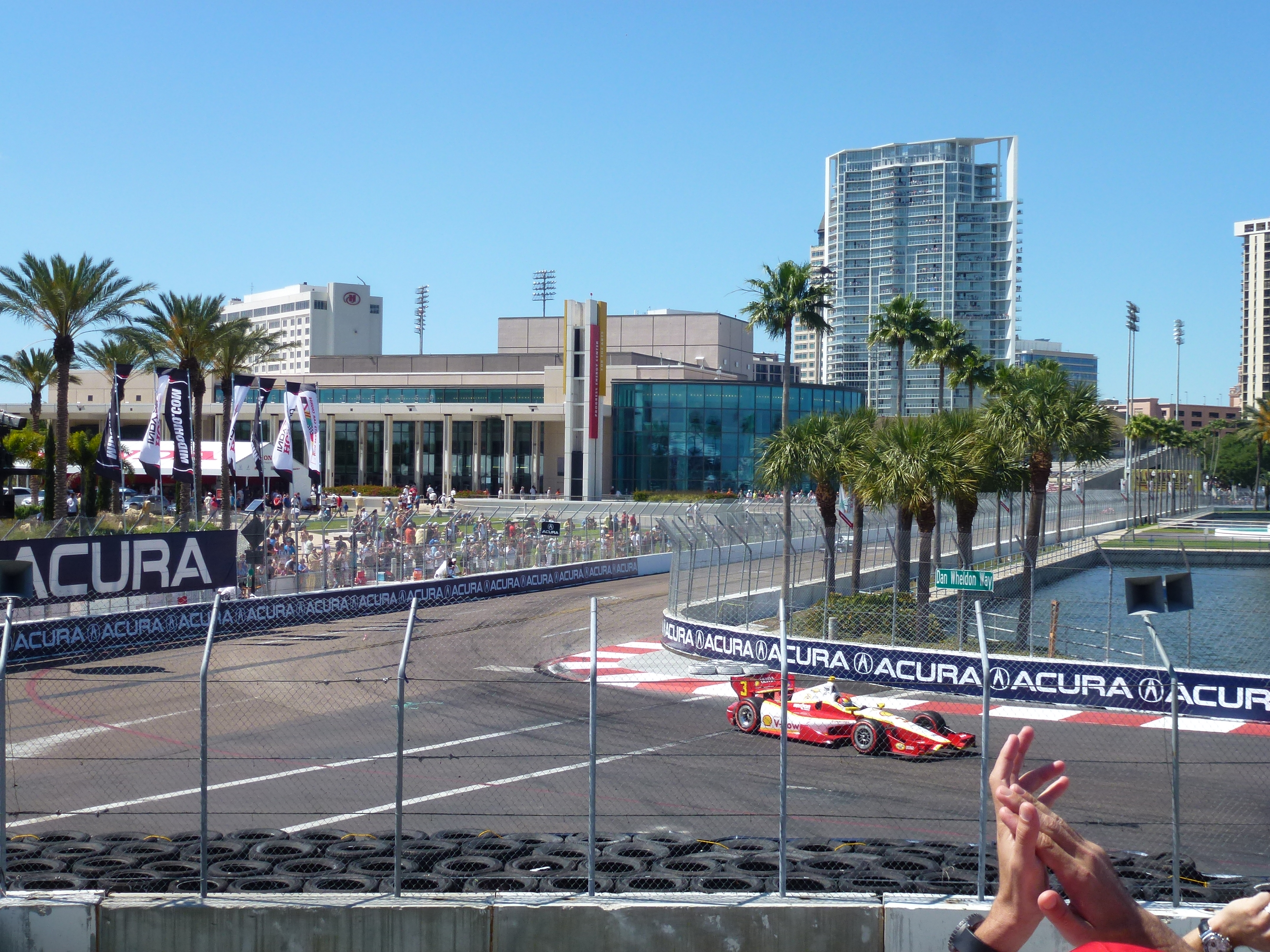
Dan Wheldon Way during the 2012 Honda Grand Prix of St. Petersburg

West of downtown on Central Avenue is the 600 Block Arts District, which contains Bohemian art and clothing stores. The eve-N-odd gallery is located in the historic Crislip Arcade built in 1925. The refurbished shopping arcade is one of 13 original city arcades built in the city. Only three are left, and only the Crislip arcade is still being used as a place for small businesses to set up shop. Further west is the Grand Central District located within Historic Kenwood District. It is known for its artistic community, LGBT presence, and the annual St. Pete Pride parade. Haslam's Bookstore, closed since 2020, can also be found in the Grand Central District. It was the largest independent bookstore in Florida, with over 30,000 square feet. As its name implies, Old Northeast is adjacent to downtown from the northeast. It is known for its historic status and eclectic architecture.

St. Petersburg boasts two historic neighborhoods: Roser Park, located just south of the downtown area, and Grenada Terrace, in the Old Northeast Neighborhood. Both are known for stately architecture, and together comprise the urban core of St. Petersburg.

A bronze statue in honor of St. Pete resident Elder Jordan stands on 22nd Street and Seventh Avenue as of October 2020. Jordan was a slave from birth up until the age of 15 when he bought his freedom and moved to St. Petersburg where he created a successful business.

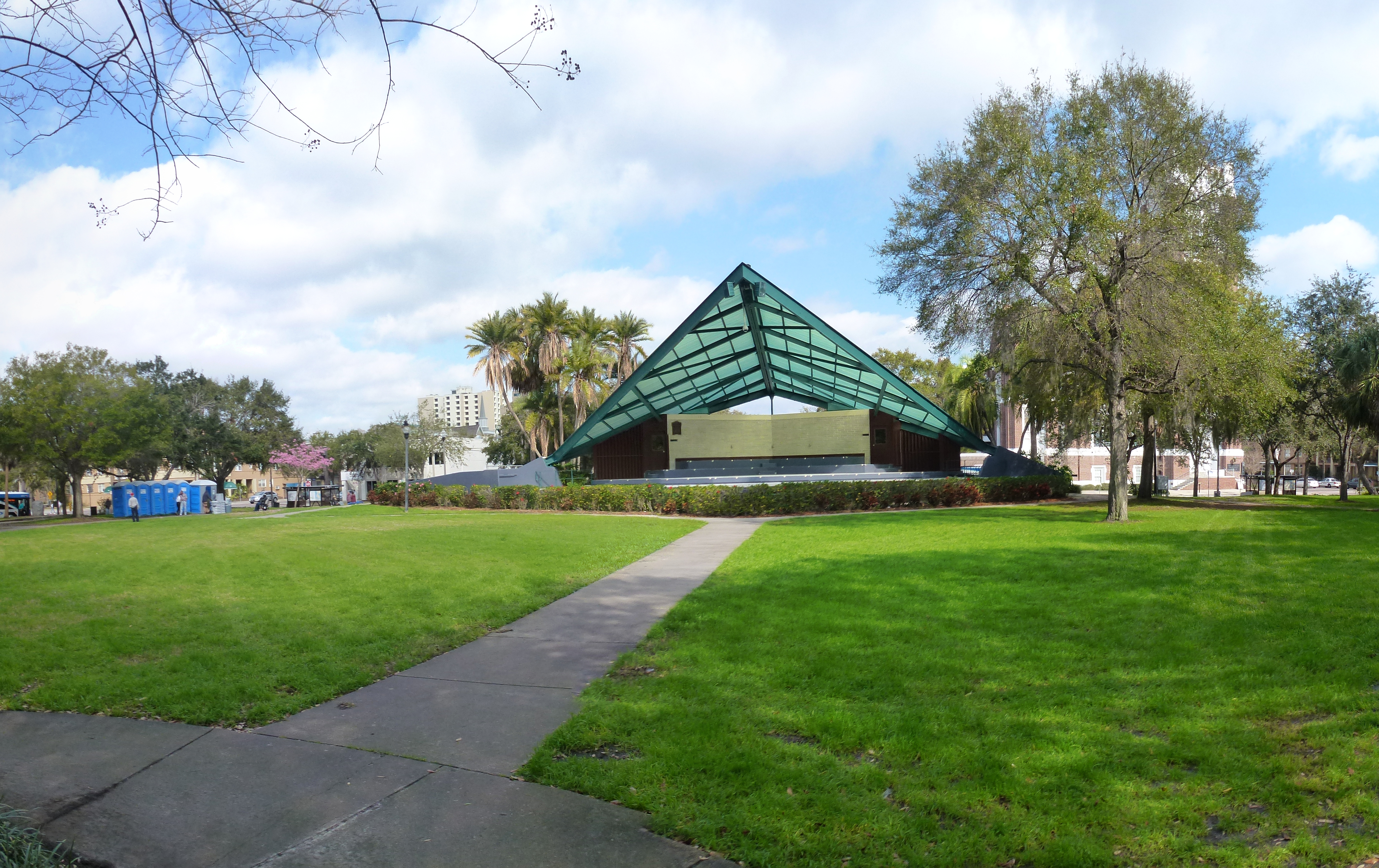
Williams Park with bandshell, one of the many public green spaces in the area

North of downtown is the Great Explorations Children's Museum, an interactive museum featuring a Children's Village with giant pretend stores, fire house and pet vet clinic, and preschool, science, music, art, and water exhibits. It is located next to Sunken Gardens.

4th Street as a whole, from Downtown up to Gandy Boulevard, is home to many restaurants and bars running the gamut from fast food to haute cuisine. This area is called the "Garden District", although as of 2010 this name is not widely in use.

Boyd Hill Nature Park, located on Lake Maggiore, is a 245-acre (0.99 km^{2}) preserve where one can see many of the endangered plants and rare wildlife of Tampa Bay. A bird exhibit houses bald eagles, owls, hawks, and other species.

The area's main shopping mall is Tyrone Square Mall, constructed in 1972 and is located in the northwestern part of the city.

=== Cinema ===
St. Petersburg has been used as a filming location for films over the years, including Once Upon a Time in America (1984), Summer Rental (1985), Cocoon (1985), Ocean's Eleven (2001), Loren Cass (2006), Dolphin Tale (2011), Magic Mike (2012), Spring Breakers (2013), Dolphin Tale 2 (2014), and Miss Peregrine's Home for Peculiar Children (2016).

Bernie the Dolphin (2018) and Garden Party (2019) were filmed around St. Petersburg.

=== Libraries ===
The St. Petersburg Library System consists of seven branch locations:

- President Barack Obama Library (scheduled to reopen after extensive renovations on September 27, 2025)
- Childs Park Library
- James Weldon Johnson Community Library
- Mirror Lake Library
- North Community Library
- South Community Library
- West Community Library

The Mirror Lake Library, built in 1915, is one of only two Carnegie libraries still operating in Florida.

=== Demonstrations and protests ===
Pride month takes place annually throughout the month of June to celebrate and recognize the identities of LGBTQ+ persons. The city of St. Petersburg hosts a variety of events to celebrate Pride Month including the annual Pride Parade.

The annual Women's March in the month of January typically takes place in Williams Park where thousands of individuals gather to march for female rights and equality. The last documented Women's March in St. Pete dates back to 2018 following the resurgence of the #MeToo Movement.

Demonstrations and protests began following the murder of George Floyd.

== Sports ==
Professional sports clubs in the Tampa Bay area
Club	Sport	League	Venue
Tampa Bay Buccaneers	Football	National Football League	Raymond James Stadium, Tampa
Tampa Bay Lightning	Ice hockey	National Hockey League	Benchmark International Arena, Tampa
Tampa Bay Rays	Baseball	Major League Baseball	Tropicana Field, St. Petersburg
Tampa Bay Rowdies	Soccer	United Soccer League	Al Lang Stadium, St. Petersburg
Bay Area Pelicans	Rugby	USA Rugby Union	Sawgrass Park, St. Petersburg

The Tampa-St. Petersburg area is represented by teams in four major professional sports (soccer, football, baseball, and hockey). Two teams, the Tampa Bay Rays of Major League Baseball and Tampa Bay Rowdies of the North American Soccer League, play in St. Petersburg proper, while the other two teams play across the bay in Tampa. As their names suggest, all of the teams represent the entire Tampa Bay area and seek to draw fans from both sides of Tampa Bay.

The Tampa-St. Petersburg area hosted the Super Bowl LV, where the Tampa Bay Buccaneers took on the Kansas City Chiefs at Raymond James Stadium on February 7, 2021.

The Rays began play in 1998, finishing last in the American League's East Division in nine of the first ten seasons they played, including their last year known as the "Devil Rays": 2007. In 2008, their 11th season, they held off the Boston Red Sox and won the AL East Division Championship for the first time. In the playoffs, they again faced the Red Sox in the ALCS. They defeated Boston and won the American League Pennant. However, they lost to the Philadelphia Phillies in the 2008 World Series. The Rays also made an appearance in the 2020 World Series where they faced the Los Angeles Dodgers.

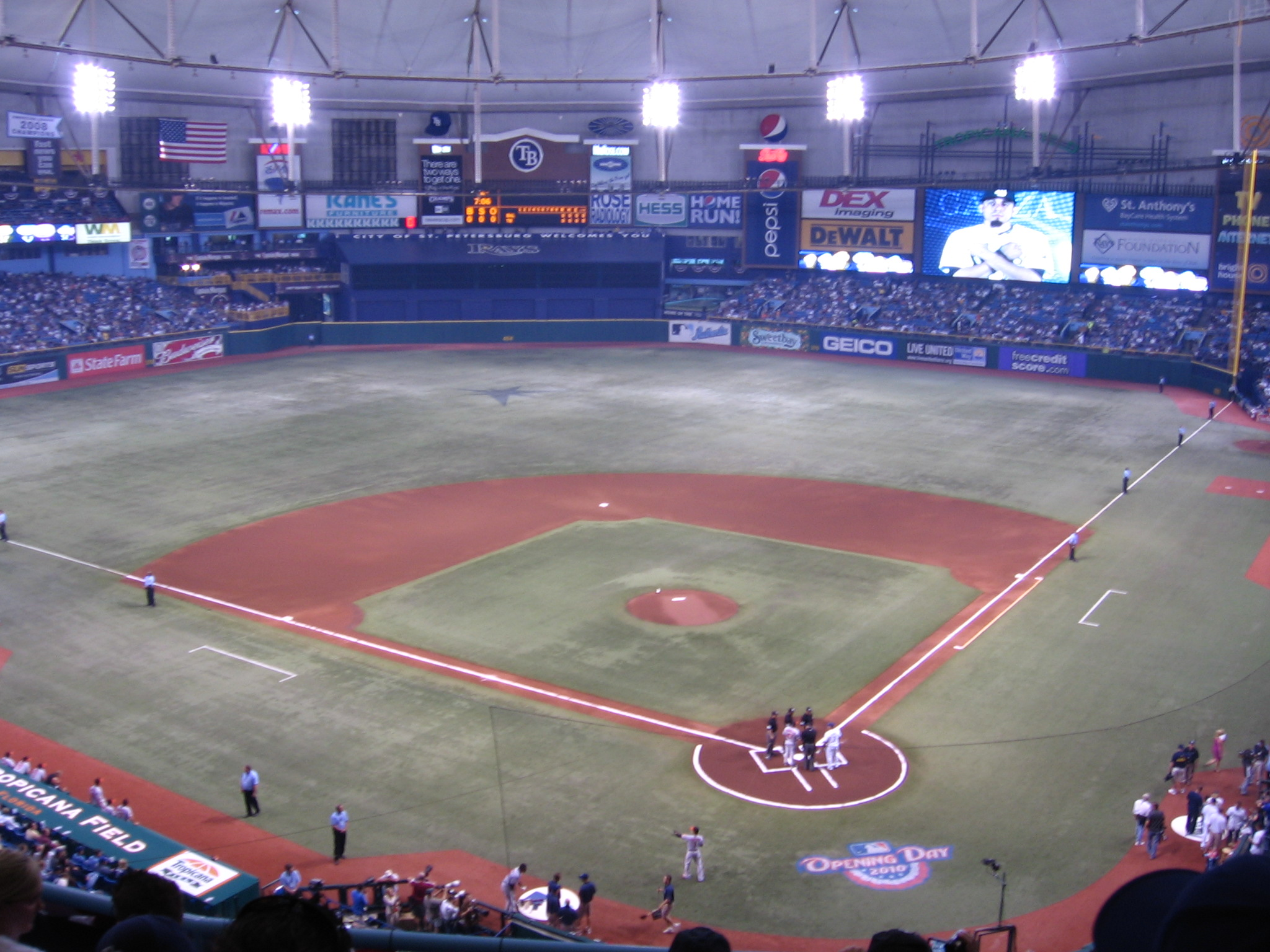
Tropicana Field shown from the upper deck during the first game of the 2010 Tampa Bay Rays season

From their inception until 2008, the Rays played their regular season games at Tropicana Field and their spring training games at historic Al Lang Stadium, formerly Progress Energy Park, giving them the unique distinction of being the only team in Major League Baseball that played its spring training games in their home city in more than 70 years. Beginning in 2009, the Rays have held spring training at Charlotte Sports Park in Port Charlotte, ending a 94-year streak of springtime baseball in the city. Tropicana Field, the home venue of the Rays, played host to the 1999 Final Four. Despite not having a team in the city since 2000 (with the St. Petersburg Devil Rays), St. Petersburg is home to Minor League Baseball's main headquarters. Due to the damage on Tropicana Field caused by Hurricane Milton, the Rays spent the 2025 season at George M. Steinbrenner Field in Tampa.

St. Petersburg is home to the Grand Prix of St. Petersburg, the inaugural race was held in April 2005. The circuit itself is made of downtown streets passing Al Lang Stadium, the marina, and a runway in Albert Whitted Airport, and streets are temporarily blocked off for the annual IndyCar Series race. The race was postponed in 2020 due to the spread of the COVID-19 coronavirus, and was rescheduled as the final race of the season, rather than the first race. In 2012, the road intersecting Turn 10 was renamed Dan Wheldon Way in memory of Dan Wheldon, who won the 2005 race thanks to a move made on that turn. Wheldon was killed in an accident at the Las Vegas Motor Speedway in the 2011 season finale. In 2026 the circuit began hosting the NASCAR Craftsman Truck Series alongside the IndyCar Series on the same weekend.

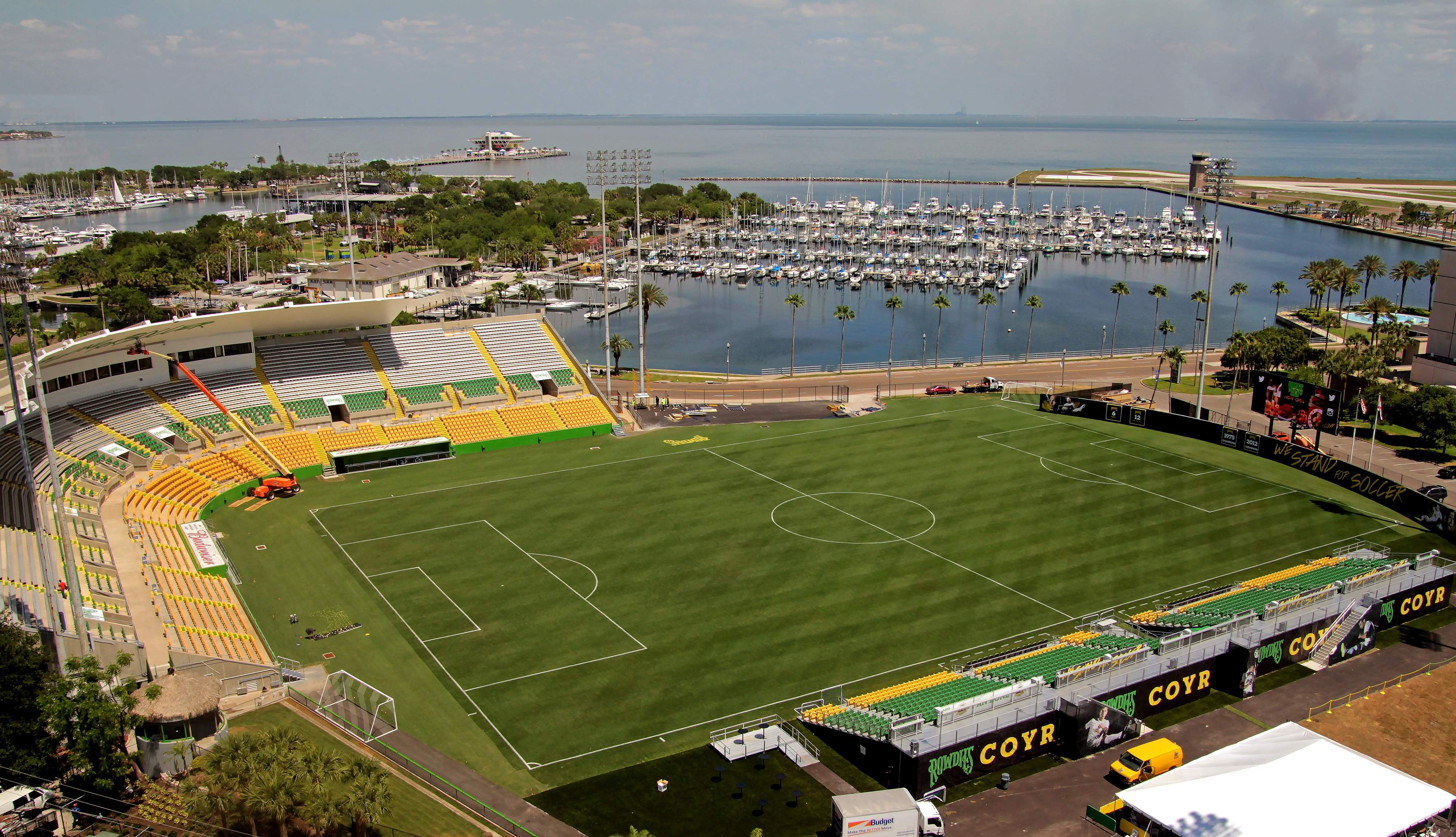
The newly renovated Al Lang Stadium for the Tampa Bay Rowdies

The Tampa Bay Rowdies of the United Soccer League began play in Tampa in 2010 and moved to Al Lang Stadium in 2011. The long-time baseball venue is named after Al Lang, a former mayor of St. Petersburg who was instrumental in bringing spring training to the city in 1914. The Rowdies initially shared Al Lang Stadium with various amateur baseball events, but eventually took over operation of the facility and has converted it into a soccer-only facility The Rowdies' ownership has expressed interest in moving up to join Major League Soccer (MLS) and a 2016 referendum gave the club permission to build a larger privately funded stadium at the site of Al Lang Stadium if the move takes place.

The Bay Area Pelicans Rugby Football Club has made their home in St. Petersburg since 1977.

== Government ==
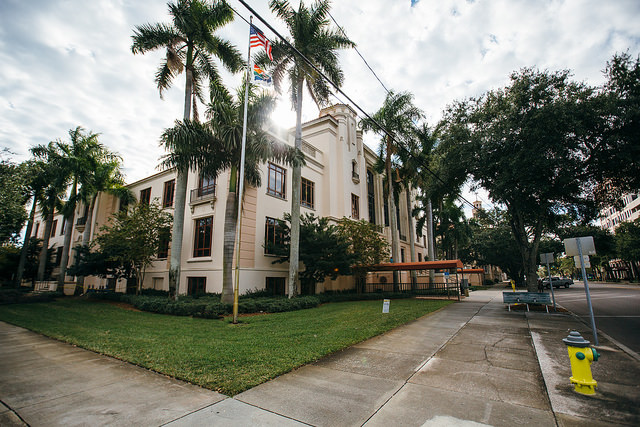
St. Petersburg's city hall

The city of St. Petersburg has been governed under a strong mayor form of government since 1993. The Mayor of St. Petersburg and the St. Petersburg City Council members are elected to a four-year term, limited to two consecutive terms. Currently the mayor of St. Petersburg is Ken Welch who took office on January 6, 2022. The legislative body consists of eight City Council members representing each of their designated city districts.

St. Petersburg is split between Florida's 13th congressional district, represented in Congress by Republican Anna Paulina Luna, and Florida's 14th congressional district, represented by Democrat Kathy Castor. The city is more left-leaning than the surrounding county. In 2020, 62.3% percent of voters in St. Petersburg's urban core cast their ballots for Democratic candidate Joe Biden.

== Education ==
=== Primary and secondary education ===
Public primary and secondary schools in St. Petersburg are administered by Pinellas County Schools. Public high schools within the city limits include:

- Gibbs High School
- Lakewood High School
- Northeast High School
- St. Petersburg High School
- St. Petersburg Collegiate High School

Private high schools include:

- Canterbury School of Florida
- St. Petersburg Catholic High School
- Shorecrest Preparatory School
- Admiral Farragut Academy

High schools located in unincorporated (outside city limits) St. Petersburg:

- Hollins High School
- Keswick Christian School
- Northside Christian School

The non-profit Science Center of Pinellas County educates more than 22,000 school children annually through field trip classes and offers winter, spring and summer workshops for 2,000 more.

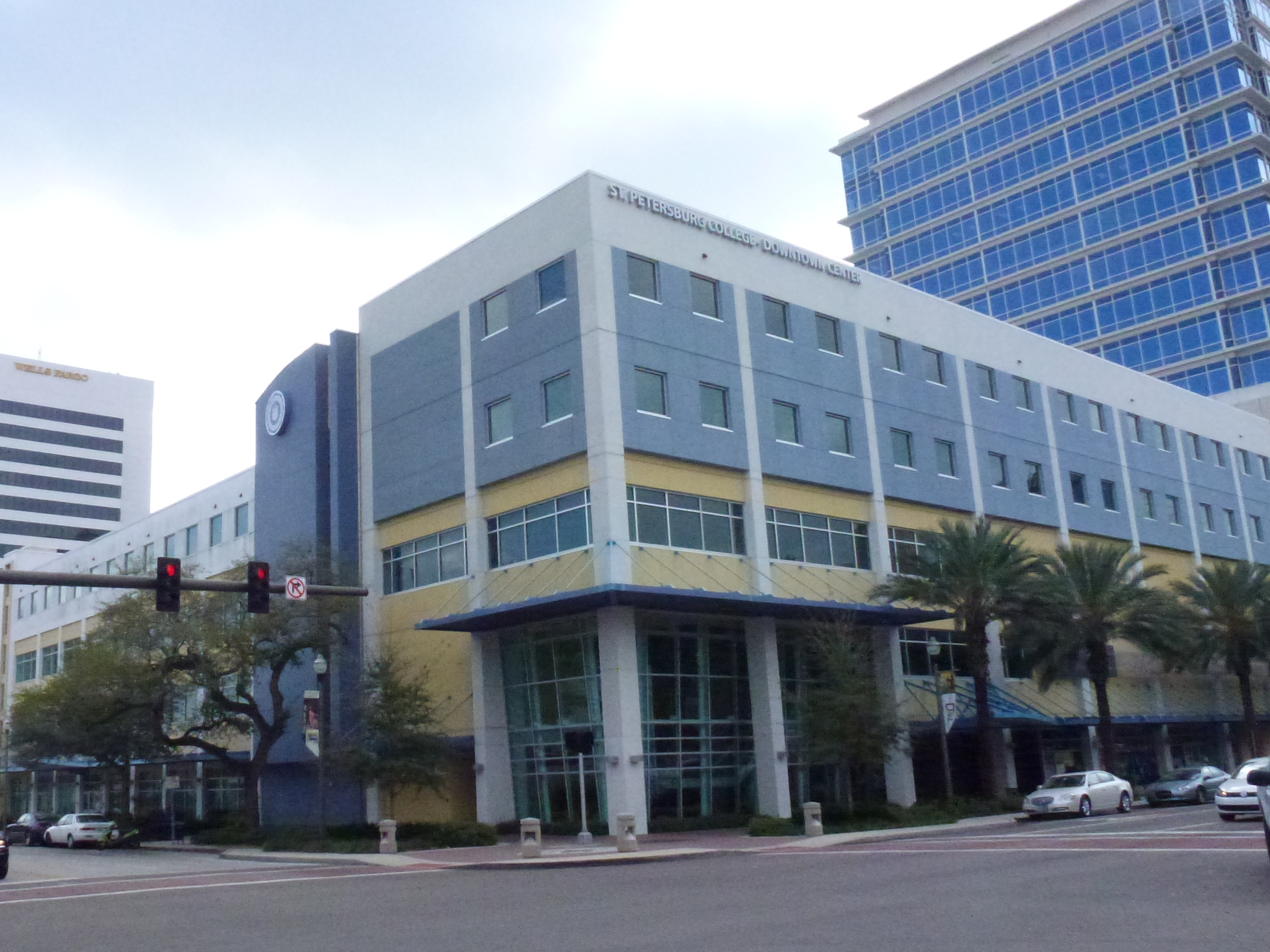
The St. Petersburg College Downtown Center

=== Higher education ===
St. Petersburg is home to several institutions of higher education. The University of South Florida St. Petersburg is an autonomous campus in the University of South Florida system. The University of South Florida St. Petersburg serves 6,500 students. Eckerd College, founded in 1958, is a private four-year liberal arts college. Also in St. Petersburg is the Poynter Institute, a journalism institute which owns the Tampa Bay Times in a unique arrangement. Stetson Law School is located in Gulfport, which is adjacent to St. Petersburg between the south beaches. St. Petersburg College, founded in 1927, is a state college within the Florida College System. It has an average of 65,000 students spread across 11 campuses and centers in the Bay area, four of which are in St. Petersburg.

Other colleges and universities in the wider Tampa Bay Area include the University of South Florida and the University of Tampa located in Tampa and Hillsborough Community College, with campuses across Hillsborough County.

== Media ==
The city's main daily morning newspaper is the Tampa Bay Times.

In addition to regional coverage, several digital publications focus specifically on St. Petersburg and the surrounding Pinellas County area. St. Pete Rising reports on new development, retail, and restaurant openings across the city, while St. Pete Catalyst covers local business, civic issues, and community news.

Cable television service is provided by Spectrum (previously Bright House Networks) and Wide Open West (abbreviated "WOW!", previously Knology), as well as fiber optic service provider Frontier Communications (previously Verizon FiOS).

St. Petersburg is in the Tampa-St. Petersburg television and radio markets. WTSP channel 10 (CBS) and WTOG channel 44 (Independent) are licensed to St. Petersburg, with studios in unincorporated Pinellas County in the Gandy Boulevard area just north of the St. Petersburg limits. Spectrum Bay News 9, the local cable TV news service, is based in northeast St. Petersburg. CW owned-and-operated station WTTA is licensed to St. Petersburg, with studios in Tampa. Official city government programming, known as StPeteTV, can be found on Spectrum on Channel 641, WOW! Cable on Channel 15 or Frontier Channel 20 as well as online. City government programming previously aired on city-owned WSPF-CD channel 35 until 2012, when the city sold the station to private interests.

== Infrastructure ==
=== Transportation ===
==== Roads ====
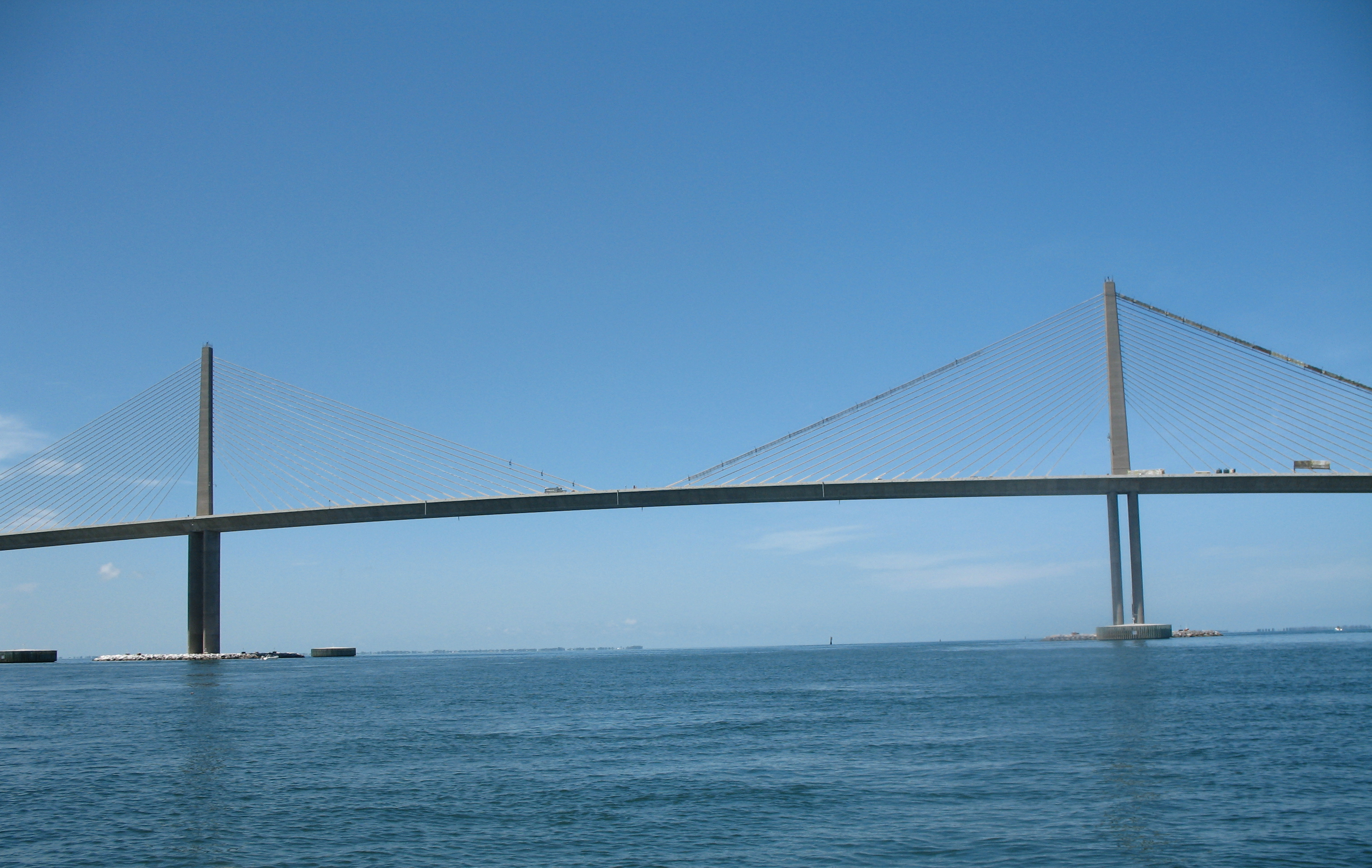
The Sunshine Skyway Bridge viewed from Tampa Bay

The city is connected to Tampa by the east by causeways and bridges across Tampa Bay, and to Bradenton in the south by the Sunshine Skyway Bridge (Interstate 275), which traverses the mouth of the bay. It is also served by Interstates 175 and 375, which branch off I-275 into the southern and northern areas of downtown respectively. The Gandy Bridge, conceived by George Gandy and opened in 1924, was the first causeway to be built across Tampa Bay, connecting St. Petersburg and Tampa cities without a circuitous 43-mile (69 km) trip around the bay through Oldsmar.

As for the history of the roads of St. Petersburg, the total and complete failure of Hillsborough County to build roads on the peninsula was one of the main reasons why Pinellas County was formed. Through Pinellas County, a system of marl roads was built throughout the county, giving good service for a while until the rain gave trouble with the marl surface. A demand was then made for brick roads, which was met with opposition for the price of bricks was much more expensive, the election was eventually passed a new network of nine-foot brick roads was completed by November 15, 1916. It had only been a few years after that, and it was apparent that there was a mistake with the fact that 9 foot roads were not wide enough to handle the heavy traffic, which was at the time two cars to pass each other - which was essential. There was another issue that the shoulders could not be maintained in good condition either, probably due to the fact that drivers had to constantly use them due to the road not being wide enough to begin with. It took years later for the election to finally be called and passed to create wider and better roads on a bond issue of $2,597,000.

==== Airports ====
Nearby Tampa International Airport (TPA) provides air transportation for many passengers. Historically, smaller airlines with service to smaller cities and towns have operated at St. Petersburg-Clearwater International Airport, with a number of air carriers only providing only seasonal services. The exception at the St. Petersburg-Clearwater International Airport (PIE) is Allegiant Air which currently operates Airbus A319 and A320 mainline jetliners into the airfield with year-round nonstop service from many cities in the eastern U.S. Albert Whitted Airport provides general aviation services near the heart of downtown St. Petersburg.

==== Mass transit ====
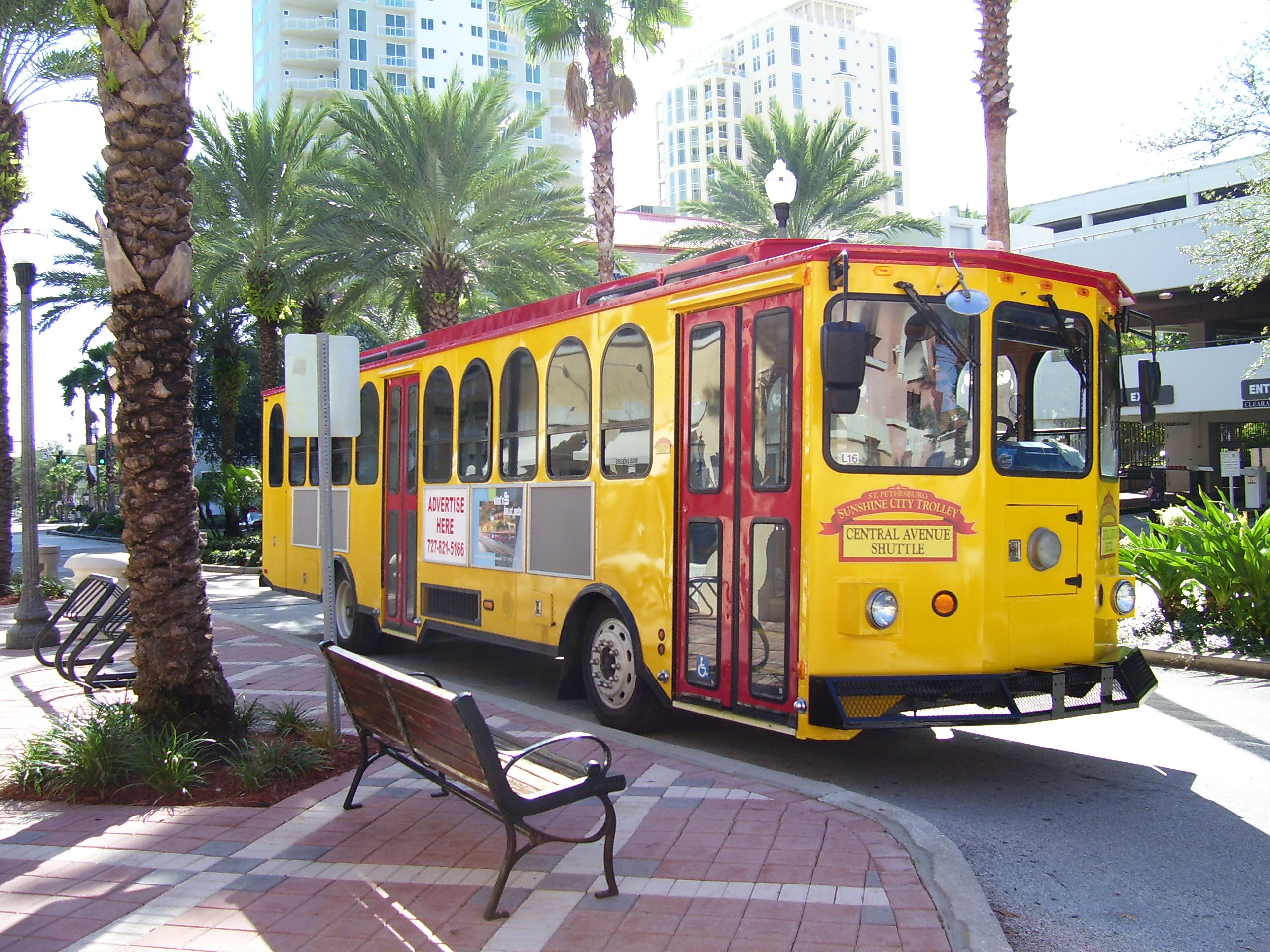
Trolley serving Downtown

Mass transit in St. Petersburg is provided by the Pinellas Suncoast Transit Authority (PSTA), which operates bus routes and paratransit throughout Pinellas County. The system also includes replica trolleys that run through Downtown St. Petersburg, USFSP, and multiple museums around the city. Short-term bike sharing is also offered via Coast Bike Share.

In 2022, PSTA launched the SunRunner, a bus rapid transit service connecting downtown St. Petersburg to St. Pete Beach. The SunRunner is the first bus rapid transit line in the Tampa Bay Area and is expected to spur economic development along the Central Avenue corridor in Pinellas County. In its first weekend alone, the SunRunner had over 10,000 passengers. Ridership continues to be steady; however, PSTA hiked fares, citing a homelessness issue.

==== Railroads ====
CSX Transportation operates a former Atlantic Coast Line Railroad branch line which sees daily rail traffic from north Tampa though Safety Harbor, Clearwater, and Largo. As of March 2008, the portion that ran into downtown St. Petersburg and the adjacent western industrial areas was abandoned. There is a small rail yard to the northwest of downtown St. Petersburg at the new end of the rail line with several spur lines serving industries in the area.

The former Seaboard Air Line branch from the western coastal portion of the county was abandoned in the 1980s and converted to a popular recreational trail called the Pinellas Trail.

Notable former stations include the St. Petersburg ACL station, which became an Amtrak station from 1971 to 1983, St. Petersburg Seaboard Air Line Passenger Station, and the St. Petersburg Seaboard Coast Line station.

==== Port and marinas ====
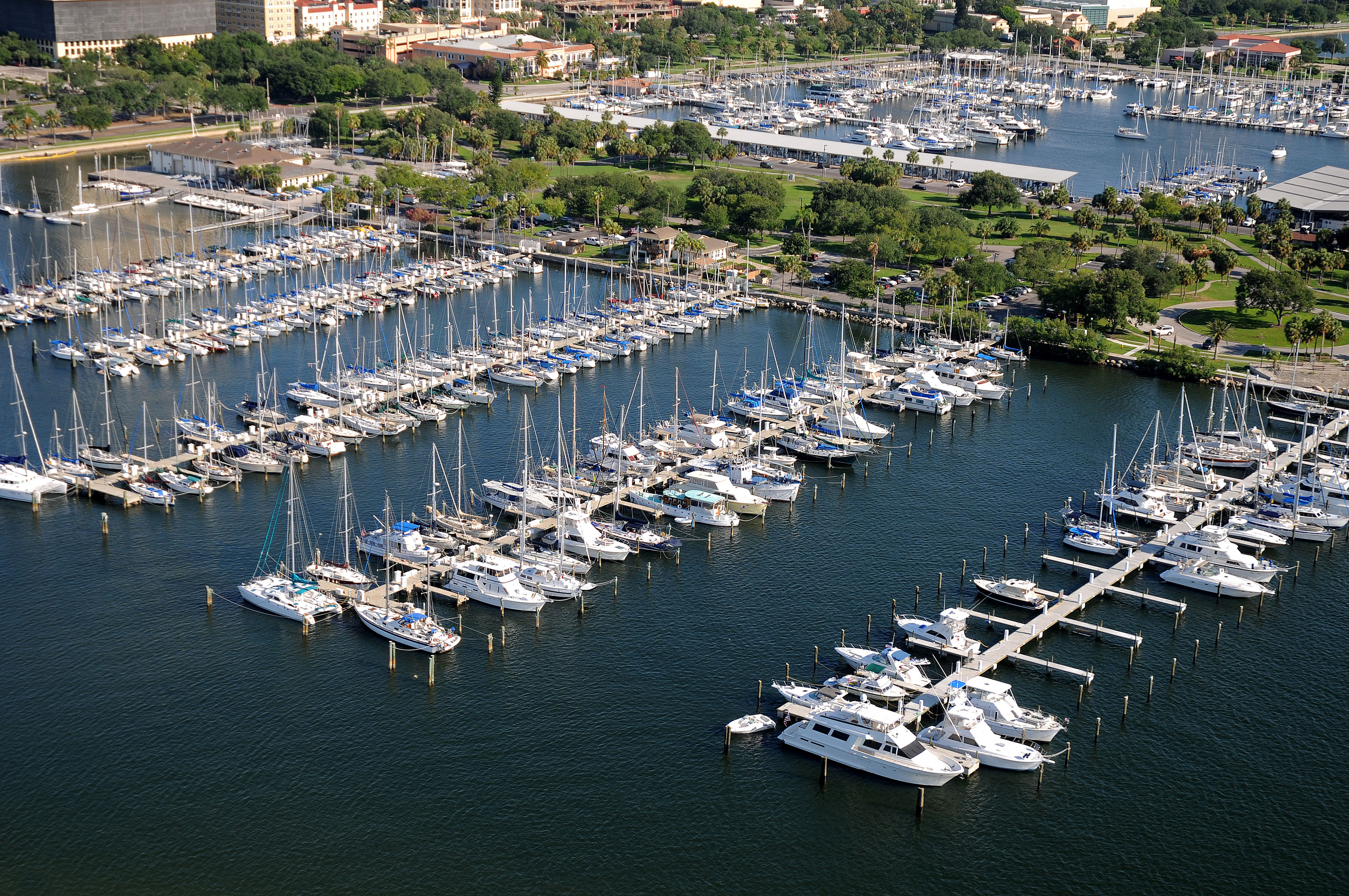
Boats located at South Basin

One of the main sea transportation areas in St. Petersburg is the Port of St. Petersburg, which is located in downtown St. Petersburg. Boat marinas in downtown St. Petersburg are also available such as the Municipal Marina which located in the Southern and Central Yacht Basins, and Harborage Marina located in the Bayboro Harbor. The Cross-Bay ferry runs, at a fee, from St. Pete to downtown Tampa.

=== Utilities ===
The city of St. Petersburg's major electricity system is provided by Duke Energy, the city's major gas system is provided by TECO Energy in the industrial and commercial parts of the city, and the city's water services are provided by the city of St. Petersburg.

== Sister cities ==
St. Petersburg is a member in Sister Cities International.

- Takamatsu, Kagawa, Japan (since 1961)
- Isla Mujeres, Quintana Roo, Mexico (since 2016)

=== Twin cities ===
- Saint Petersburg, Russia
- Figueres, Catalonia, Spain (since 2011)

== See also ==
- Largest metropolitan areas in the Americas
- United States cities by population
- Tallest buildings in St. Petersburg, Florida
- List of parks in St. Petersburg, Florida
- 2017 mayoral election
- St. Petersburg Bar Association
- List of people from St. Petersburg, Florida
