= Vinoy Park =

Park in St. Petersburg, Florida, United States

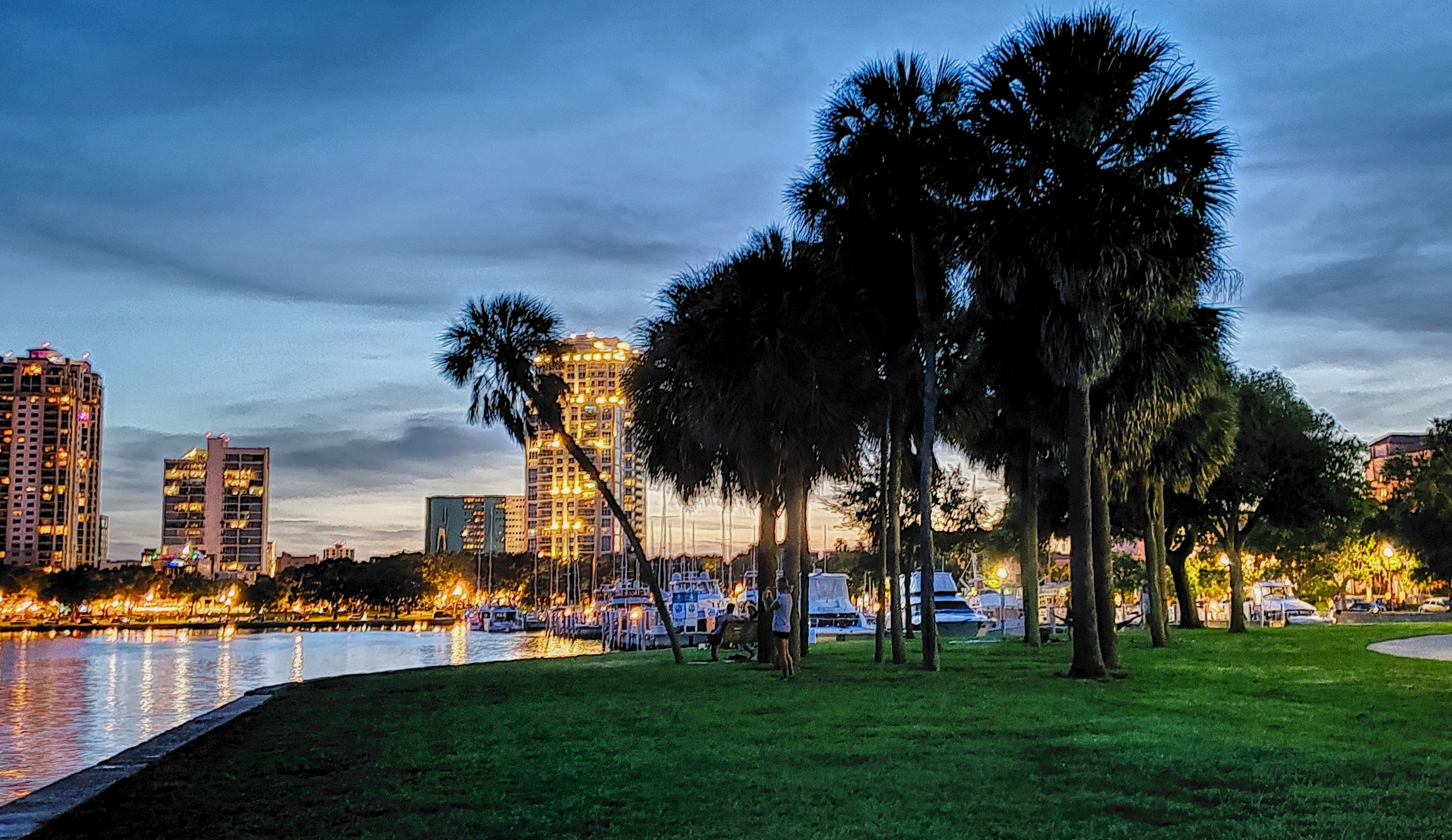
- Interactive map of Vinoy Park
- Type: Urban park
- Location: St. Petersburg, Florida
- Coordinates: 27°46′43″N 82°37′33″W
- Area: 11.6 acres (4.69 ha)
- Operator: St. Petersburg Parks & Recreation
- Status: Open all year

Vinoy Park is an 11.6-acre (4.7 ha) park located on the downtown waterfront of St. Petersburg, Florida. Vinoy Park was named after the Vinoy Park Hotel, which was originally called the Vinoy Park when constructed in 1925 and sits adjacent to the park. Vinoy Park is operated by St. Petersburg's Parks and Recreation group. The downtown waterfront park hosts yearly events including St. Petersburg's Ribfest, Tampa Bay's Blues Festival, Christmas displays, and various other events such as art festivals, concerts, and triathlons.
