= Sundial St. Pete =

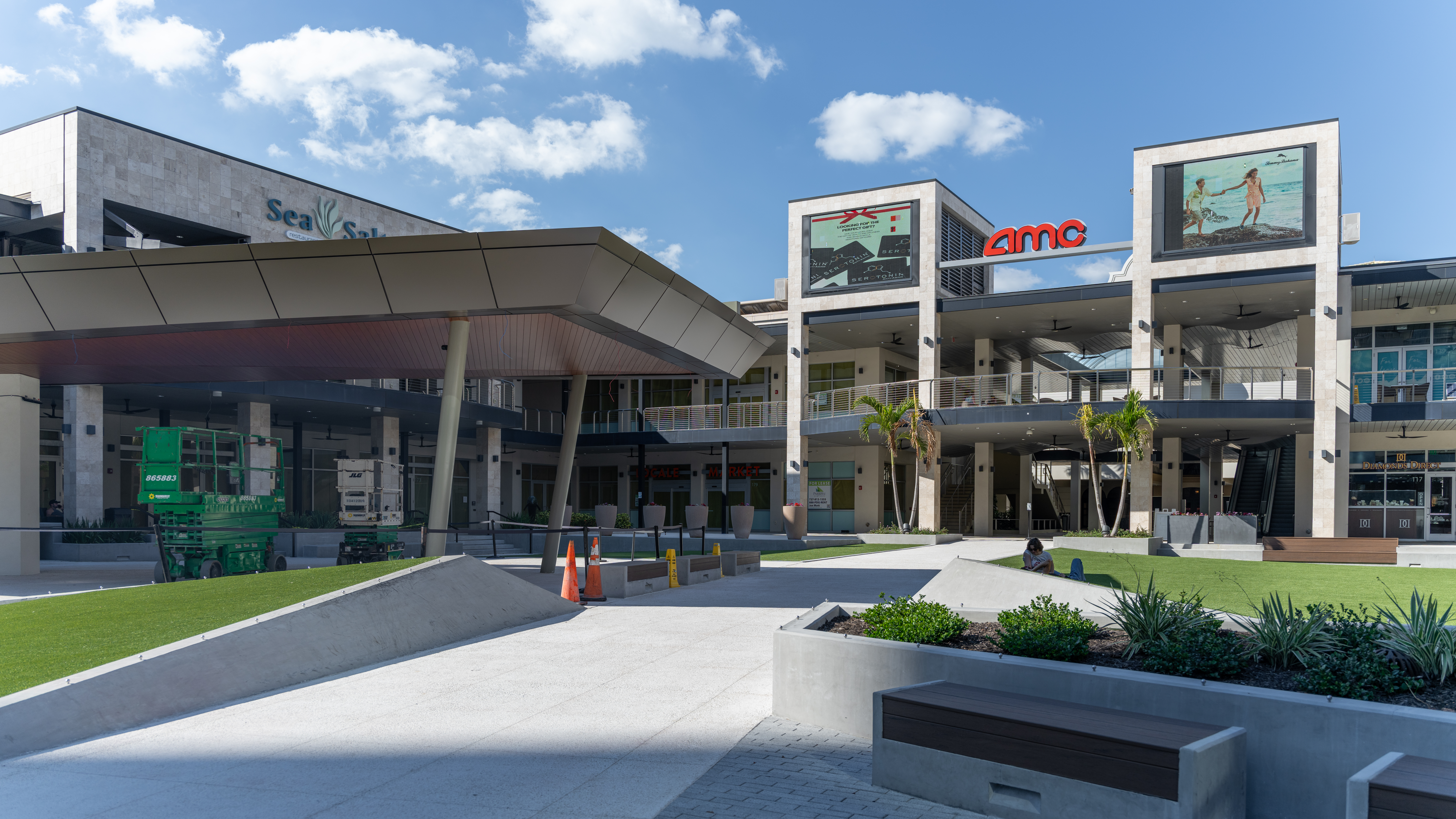

- Location in Pinellas County and the state of Florida

General information
- Type: Shopping mall
- Location: Pinellas County, 153 2nd Avenue North, St. Petersburg, Florida, United States
- Coordinates: 27°46′27″N 82°38′5″W
- Current tenants: AMC Sundial 20, Locale Market, FarmTable Cucina, Ruth’s Chris Steak House, Sea Salt, Diamonds Direct Fine Jewelers, Tommy Bahama, Tracy Negoshian & His, Juxtapose Apparel & Studio, Chico's, White House Black Market, Ansley Z Kids Co., lululemon showroom, Marilyn Monroe Spas Glamour Room, The Shave Cave
- Inaugurated: November 17, 2000
- Renovated: May 8, 2012
- Owner: Bill Edwards

Technical details
- Floor count: 2
- Floor area: 73,000 sq ft (6,800 m^{2}) + 80,000 sq ft (7,400 m^{2})

Other information
- Parking: 7-Story Parking Garage

Website
- SundialStPete.com

Sundial St. Pete, formerly known as The Shops at St. Pete, and BayWalk, is a shopping, dining and entertainment complex in downtown St. Petersburg, Florida. It opened in May 2014 with a mixture of restaurants, markets, nightlife, and shopping. As of April 2015, businesses include Locale Market, Lululemon, White House Black Market, Tommy Bahama, Chico's, Ruth's Chris Steak House, Sea Salt restaurant and Jackie Z Style Co. The complex also features a 12-screen AMC Theatre which was originally a Muvico. While the outdoor Muvico signs remain intact for the time being, slight changes have been made inside to reflect the recent acquisition of Carmike Cinemas by AMC.

== History ==
Originally opened with the name of BayWalk in the fall of 2000, the area included 73,000 square feet (6,800 m^{2}) of retail space plus an 80,000-square-foot (7,400 m^{2}) movie theater owned by Muvico Theaters. The two-story, open-air shopping center featured a mix of Florida contemporary and traditional Mediterranean architectural styles with stucco-faced buildings and wrought iron touches. Economic problems resulted in high vacancy rates.

St. Petersburg businessman Bill Edwards bought the complex for $5.2 million in September 2011, and announced plans to revitalize the complex. It has since undergone extensive renovations and two name changes. Edwards dubbed the new project "The Shops at St Pete". On February 19, 2014, the complex was publicly renamed Sundial St. Pete.

== Design ==
The renovated courtyard at Sundial St. Pete features a nearly two-story sundial sculpture, designed by renowned production designer René Lagler and crafted by Thomas Sign & Awning Co. in Pinellas County. Surrounding the sundial is a mosaic lagoon water feature. Six bronze dolphins are depicted playing in and around the feature. The dolphin sculptures were designed and crafted by St. Petersburg master sculptor Mark Aeling and his team at MGA Sculpture Studio.

== Tenants ==
The Locale market includes a gourmet grocer, wine bar, and restaurant. It is a partnership between celebrity chefs Michael Mina of San Francisco, California and Don Pintabona, who is a returnee to the Tampa Bay region. He completed an undergraduate degree at the University of South Florida in Tampa and began his chef career working at a restaurant on Busch Boulevard in Tampa.

Sea Salt restaurant is an upscale seafood and steak restaurant.

== See also ==
- Channelside, shopping and entertainment complex similar to Baywalk. Located across the bay in Downtown Tampa.
- International Plaza and Bay Street, mall and nightlife district in the Westshore district of Tampa.
