= The Village at Medford Center =

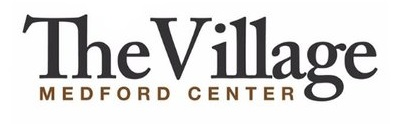
- Location: Medford, Oregon, United States
- Opened: 1959
- Developer: LBG Real Estate Companies, LLC
- Owner: LBG Real Estate Companies, LLC
- Num. of stores: 50+
- Num. of anchor tenants: 5
- Floor area: 420,000-square-foot (39,000 m^{2})
- Floors: 1
- Website: The Village at Medford Center

The Village at Medford Center, formerly known as The Medford Center, is a regional shopping complex in east Medford, Oregon, United States. Spanning an 420,000-square-foot (39,000 m^{2}) of retail space spread over 36 acres, this regional retail center holds the distinction of being one of the oldest and largest shopping centers in Jackson County, alongside Rogue Valley Mall.

== History ==
Prior to its construction, the site was primarily used for agricultural purposes, including livestock grazing. The origins of The Village at Medford Center, initially named The Medford Center, trace back to 1959, marking its role as a pioneering shopping destination in the Medford area. Strategically located adjacent to the Interstate 5 Highway, the center was anchored by Sears from its inception.

Originally, the shopping center had 333,000-square-foot (30,900 m^{2}) of retail space and was an outdoor strip mall. The shopping center underwent a significant transformation in 1984. It was converted into an enclosed shopping destination. The 1980s witnessed the integration of numerous stores into the center, including prominent additions like Payless Drug Stores and Safeway, which expanded the complex by 85,000-square-foot (7,900 m^{2}). Prior to the unveiling of the Rogue Valley Mall in 1986, The Village held the distinction of being the largest shopping hub in Medford. In 1997, the premises saw the inauguration of Cinemark Tinseltown USA, the largest movie theater in southern Oregon. This establishment replaced the Cine' 4 theater in north Medford and the Movies 5 theater at Rogue Valley Mall, both of which were also operated by Cinemark.

In 2014, LBG Real Estate Companies assumed ownership of the shopping center and embarked on an ambitious revitalization project, rebranding it as The Village at Medford Center. This renovation introduced several enhancements, including glass barrel vault canopies, seating, ambient music, and other amenities. New building facades and pavers were also integrated throughout the center as part of the project, contributing to more than $25 million in improvements to The Village at Medford Center, now Southern Oregon’s only lifestyle and entertainment center. The redevelopment encompassed the entire 420,000-square-foot shopping center, helping to attract new retailers, dining establishments, entertainment venues, and health and wellness uses.

On December 28, 2018, it was announced that the Sears store would be closing as part of a plan to close 80 stores nationwide. It closed in March 2019, and as a result of ongoing development work it has been replaced by Burlington, T.J. Maxx, and Daiso, with Ross Dress for Less located in an adjacent space.

Other additions to the shopping center included Tap & Vine restaurant, the Butterfly Club speakeasy, the local nonprofit Collaborative Theatre Project, Get Air Trampoline Park, and other ventures. The center also saw a major modernization of Village Fitness, with approximately $1.5 million invested in the renovation.

== See also ==
- List of shopping malls in Oregon
