= Rogue Valley Mall =

- Location: Medford, Oregon, United States
- Coordinates: 42.3433°N 122.8777°W
- Address: 1600 North Riverside Avenue
- Opened: Oct. 15, 1986; 40 years ago
- Manager: Spinoso Real Estate Group
- Num. of stores: 100+
- Num. of anchor tenants: 6
- Floor area: 640,000 square feet (59,000 m^{2})
- Floors: 2
- Website: roguevalleymall.com

The Rogue Valley Mall, a regional shopping mall located in Medford, Oregon. It is named for Rogue Valley in southwestern Oregon, where it is located adjacent to a Target store and Interstate 5, with Bear Creek separating it from the interstate.

The mall houses more than one hundred stores, including Chico's, Aeropostale, American Eagle. The current anchor stores are Kohl's, JCPenney, Macy's, a separate Macy's store consisting of Macy's Home (on the lower level) and Macy's Backstage (upper level), and the food court has ten eateries. The total area within the mall is about 847,000 square feet.

== History ==
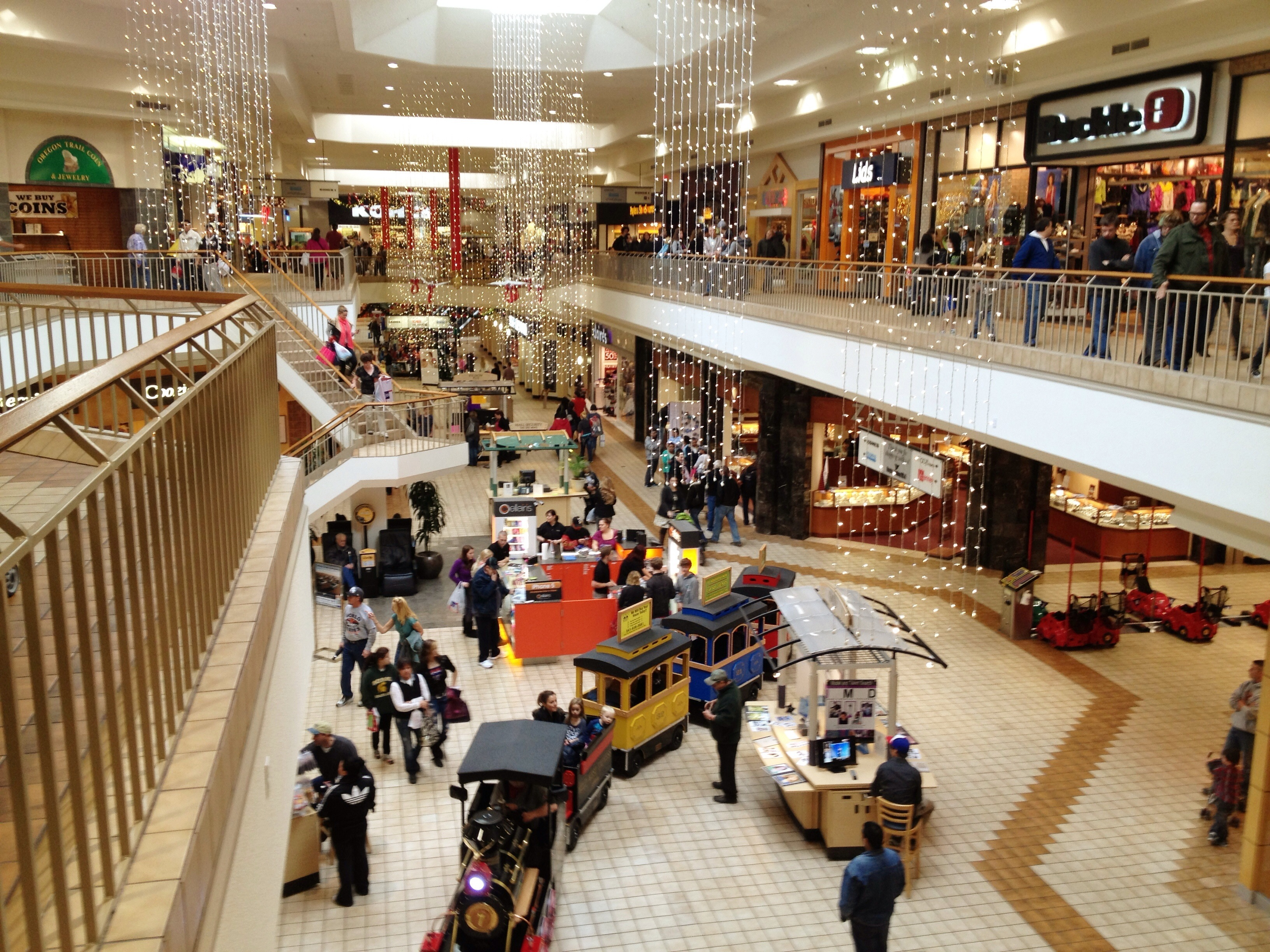
Rogue Valley Mall during Black Friday, 2012

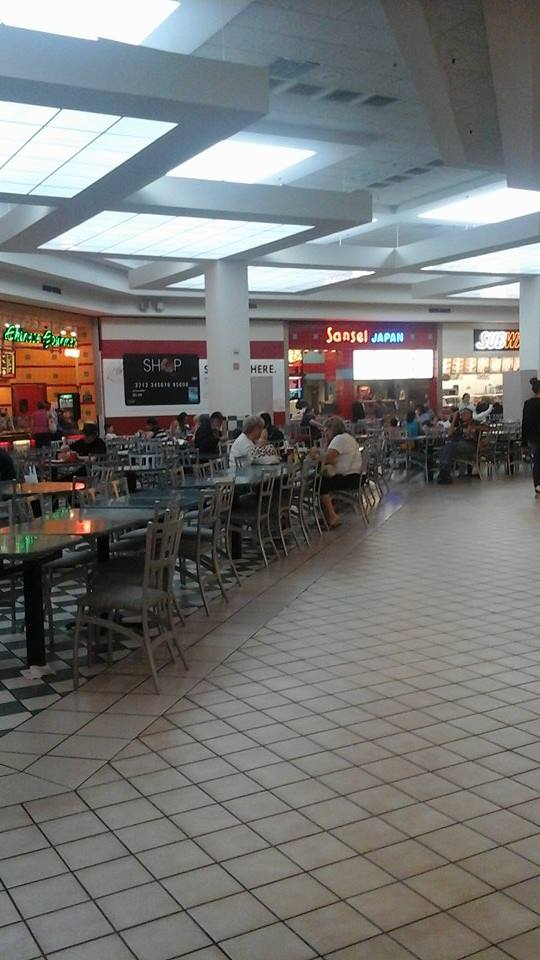
Food court at Rogue Valley Mall

The Rogue Valley Mall was built in 1986 near the interchange of Interstate 5 and Oregon Route 62 (Crater Lake Highway), near the intersection of Oregon 62 and Oregon Route 99. Early anchor stores included Mervyn's, Montgomery Ward, JCPenney, and Meier & Frank.

In 2001, the first anchor closed when Montgomery Ward filed for Chapter 11 bankruptcy. Meier & Frank Home Store took tenancy of the vacated lower level, while Copeland Sports occupied the upper level. When Meier & Frank was bought by Federated Department Stores, the stores were rebranded as Macy's and Macy's Home, respectively. In August 2006, Copeland Sports filed for bankruptcy and was bought by Sports Authority. After Mervyn's pulled out of Oregon in 2007, the vacant space was bought by Kohl's, leaving JCPenney as the only remaining original anchor.

Linens-N-Things operated a large store between Mervyn's and Macy's Home Store until the company went bankrupt in 2008, after which the space was occupied by Bed Bath & Beyond.

The Rogue Valley Mall is home to the last remaining Sam Goody store in the world, as well as the last Orange Julius in the state. On September 9, 2015, the first In-N-Out Burger in Oregon opened on the mall grounds along Crater Lake Highway.

On May 18, 2016, it was announced that Sports Authority would be closing all stores, including the Rogue Valley Mall location. The store closed in August 2016 and was replaced by Macy's Backstage in 2019. On February 5, 2024, the mall's management was assigned and acquired by Spinoso Real Estate Group.

== See also ==
- The Village at Medford Center
- List of shopping malls in Oregon
