= Oakway Center =

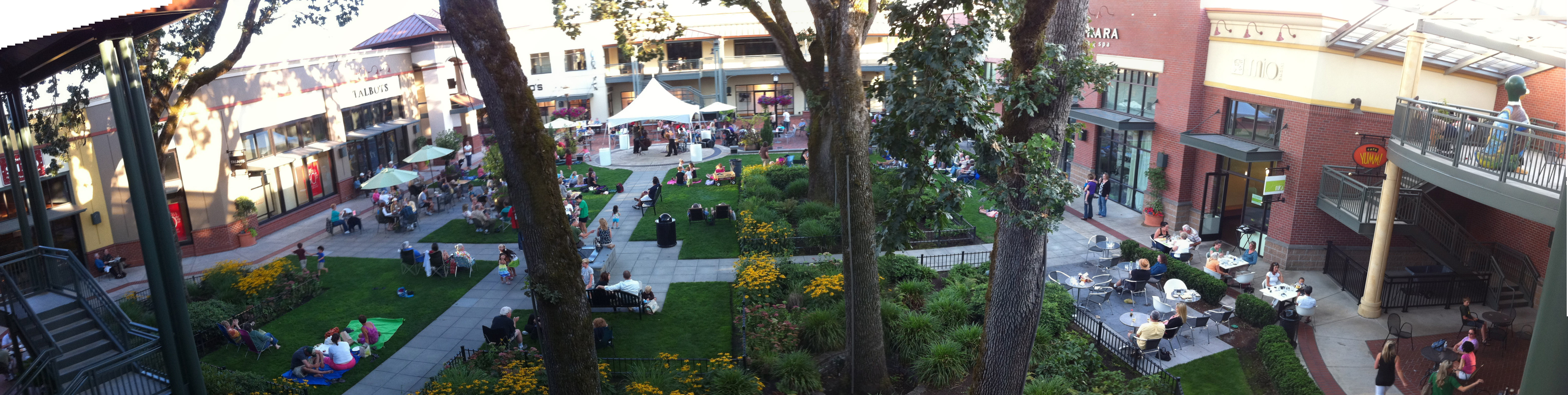
- Panorama of Oakway Center in 2010
- Location: Eugene, Oregon
- Coordinates: 44.040231°N 123.043692°W
- Opened: 1966
- Num. of stores: approximately 42
- Num. of anchor tenants: 5
- Floors: 1
- Website: oakwaycenter.com

The Oakway Center is a shopping center in Eugene, Oregon. It is one of the three shopping malls in the area. The annual sales are $1 to 2.5 million (D&B: $1,300,000). Oakway Center is anchored by Nordstrom Rack, Old Navy, and Trader Joe's.

It opened in 1966 as Oakway Mall, with an Albertsons supermarket, Tiffany's Drugstore, and Oakway Department Store as anchors. The Oakway Department store closed after only six years and was subdivided. Albertsons moved to a new store in 1990 and converted to TJ Maxx the same year. After Tiffany's closed in 1998, it became a Borders Books & Music, which closed in 2011 and was rumored to become an H&M. TJ Maxx moved across the street in 2005 and was subdivided among other retailers, including White House/Black Market. In 2013 Nordstrom Rack announced that they would open a new store where Borders Books & Music was located.

On May 21, 2020, it was announced that Pier 1 Imports would be closing all stores, including the Oakway Center location. On January 31, 2025, it was announced that the Eugene location of REI would be relocating to the Oakway Center in 2026. It will occupy the former Bed Bath and Beyond location, which closed in 2023.

== See also ==
- List of shopping malls in Oregon
