= Sunset Esplanade =

The Sunset Esplanade
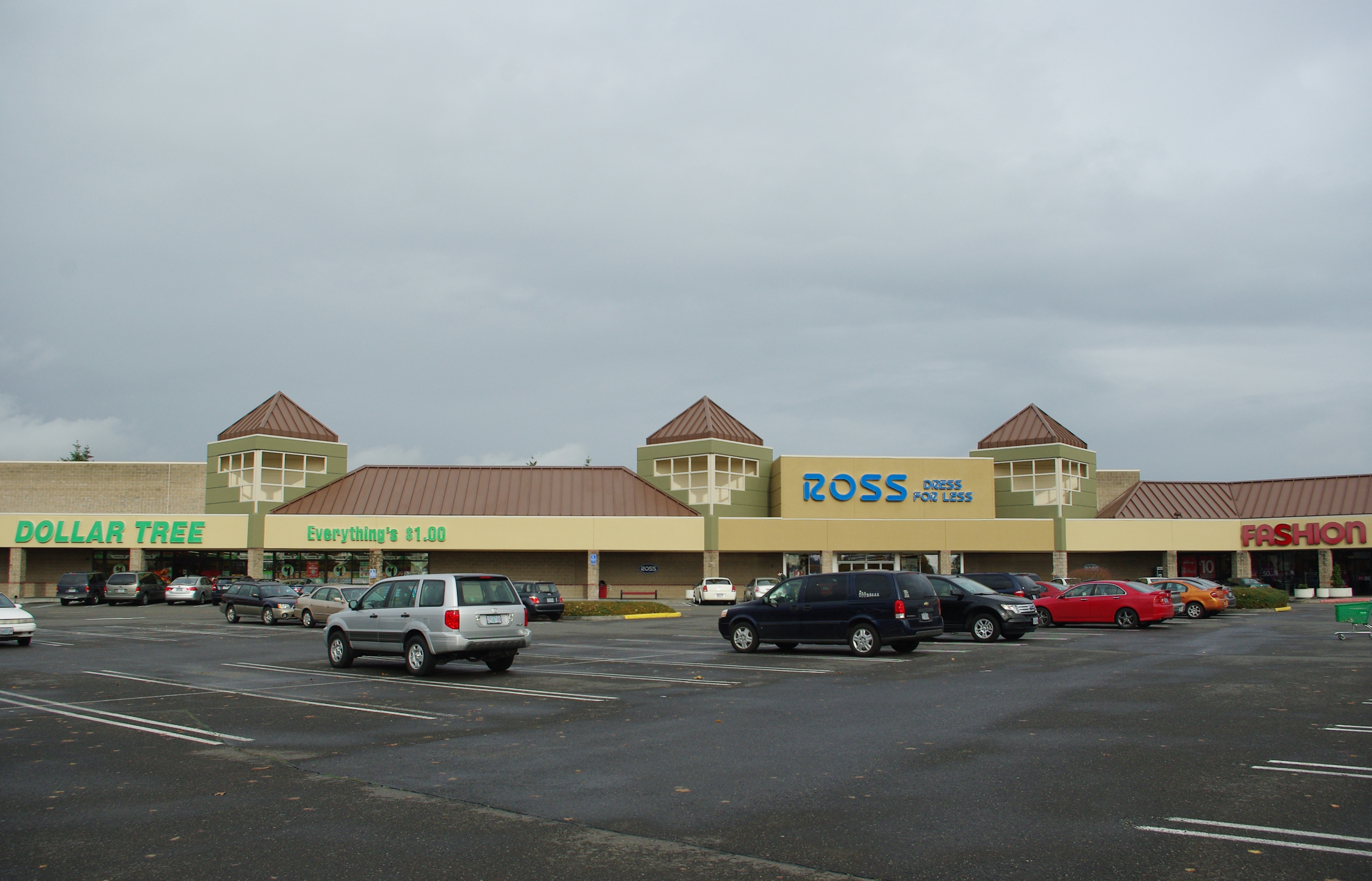
- The shopping center in November 2010
- Location: Hillsboro, Oregon, United States
- Coordinates: 45.5074170°N 122.9568380°W
- Opened: 1989
- Developer: Real Property Resources, Inc.
- Owner: Pine Tree
- Num. of stores: 35
- Num. of anchor tenants: 5
- Floor area: 362,874 square feet (33,712.1 m^{2}) (GLA)
- Parking: 1500
- Website: Sunset Esplanade

The Sunset Esplanade is an outdoor shopping center located in the southeast part of Hillsboro, in the U.S. state of Oregon. Opened in 1989, the center is along Tualatin Valley Highway (TV Highway) at Minter Bridge Road and includes about five anchor tenants and about thirty other tenants in a complex with about 363,000 square feet (33,700 m^{2}) of space. Neighbors opposed the center when it was proposed, due to concerns over increased traffic and how it would blend with existing residential neighborhoods. After appeals to the Hillsboro City Council and state land use board, the $23 million project received approval almost two years after first proposed.

== History ==
Real Property Resources, Inc. announced plans in January 1986 to investigate building a shopping center on 100 acres (40 ha) at what was then Southeast 21st Avenue and Tualatin Valley Highway. At the time, the land was farmland, and of those 100 acres, 32 were zoned for commercial development, with the remainder zoned for residential use. The developers at that point proposed at most a 300,000 square feet (28,000 m^{2}) center, and were unsure if they would develop the residential portion of the land. Real Property Resources did not yet own the land, and were unsure what type of residential development they would build if they decided to develop the acres zoned as residential. By May of that year, the developer had proposed re-zoning the residential portion of the land to high-density to allow for the development of apartments on the eastern portion of the land.

Neighbors around the proposed development began fighting it, as they were opposed to proposed apartments as not mixing with the existing single-family homes around the site, as well as being opposed to the planned extension of Cypress Street that would convert what had been a dead-end road into a collector street connecting Main Street to TV Highway via 32nd Avenue. In May, the developers removed plans to build apartments as part of the project, and instead opted to use nearly 12 acres (4.9 ha) that would have been used for housing for additional commercial development. At that time the shopping mall was expected to cost $23 million and total as much as 350,000 square feet (33,000 m^{2}), all on the western portion of the undeveloped parcel, though other plans called for the center on the eastern portion. Low-density housing was still planned for the remainder of the 95 acres (38 ha) plot. Early plans included proposals for a covered mall with four anchor tenants with up to 400,000 square feet (37,000 m^{2}) of space in total. Due to neighborhood opposition, focused mainly on housing density and increased traffic, the city's planning commission delayed final decisions on the developer's proposals several times.

In August 1986, the Planning Commission approved changing the city's comprehensive plan to allow for the shopping center to use some land previously zoned for residential, and affirmed that decision a month later. The decision only allowed for the land to be changed from one designation to another under the comprehensive plan, but did not actually change the zoning designation at that time. Opponents of the project planned to appeal the decision to the City Council, which the hearings on the appeal were postponed by the council to allow more input from the public. In November 1986, the City Council voted unanimously to allow the change that would convert 12 acres at the site into commercially zoned land, and allow for the mall to be built.

Opponents of the shopping center then appealed the city's decision to the Oregon State Land Use Board of Appeals (LUBA) in December 1986. Meanwhile, the developers formally requested the change from residential to commercial zoning on the acreage at issue in January 1987, which neighbors again opposed. After LUBA accepted most of the city's argument, the City Council held more meetings on the proposed shopping center before finally giving approval to develop the center in August 1987.

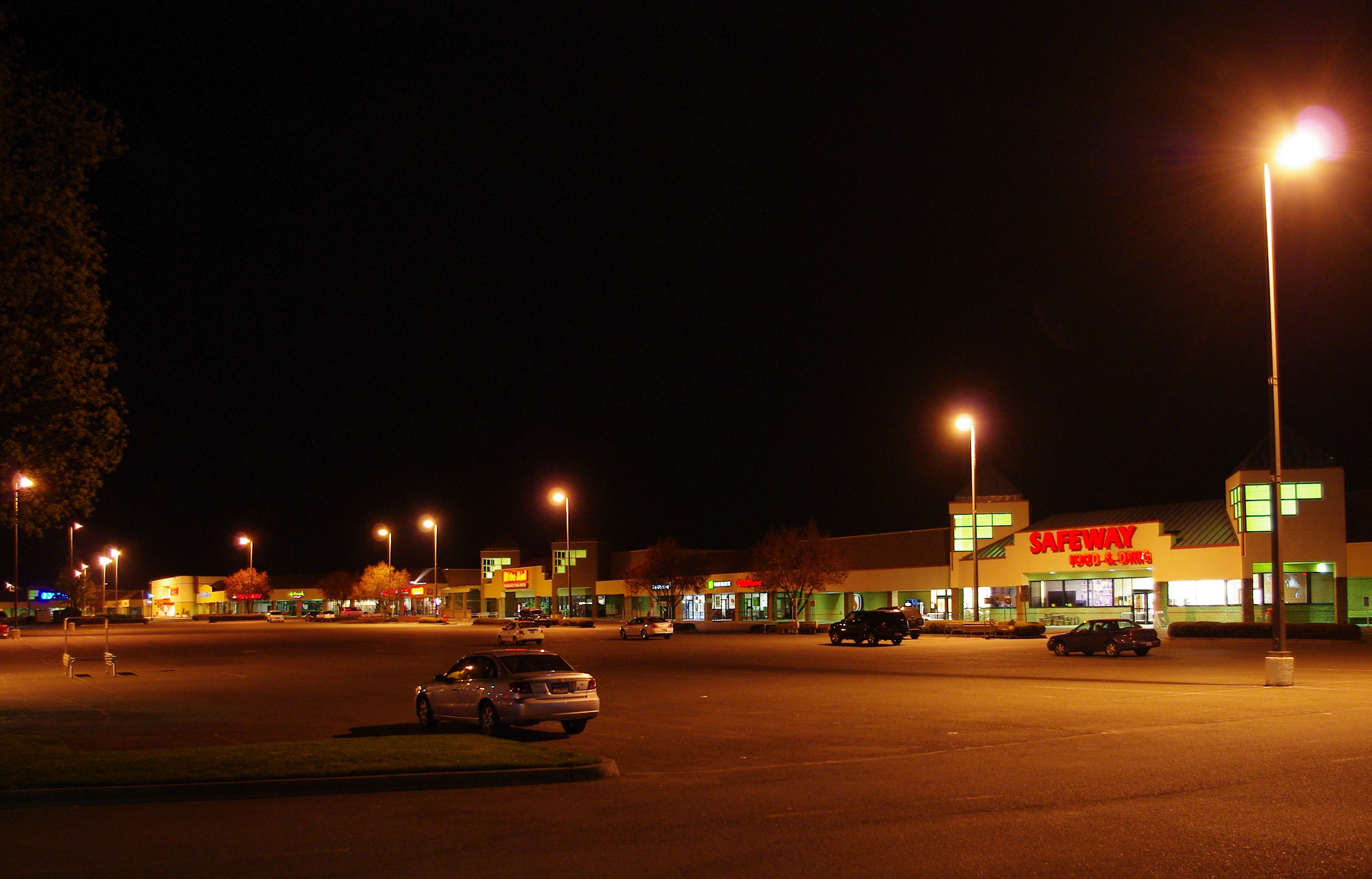
Eastern portion of the center at night

Final design plans were presented to the city in November 1987 that called for a 312,000 square feet (29,000 m^{2}) open-air shopping center that was approximately 2,000 feet (610 m) long, all set back from TV Highway, with an additional six buildings closer to the highway. It was then announced that the mall would be named The Sunset Esplanade and that Target and Lamonts had been signed up as tenants. The development was expected to cost $22 million to build, and once open, would create 770 full-time jobs. The Planning Commission approved the plans on a six-to-one vote that month, with construction expected to start in spring 1988 and be finished about February 1989. The developers finally purchased the land for the mall in February 1988. Designs called for Target to have a 102,000 square feet (9,500 m^{2}) store and Lamonts to have a 45,000 square feet (4,200 m^{2}) store, with space for three other anchor tenants.

In January 1989, retailer PayLess Drugs began using a new store format, with the first store in Oregon with the new style being the new store at the Esplanade that opened in August 1989. The developers, Real Property Resources Inc., almost sold the Esplanade in November 1989 for between $21 and $25 million to an undisclosed California trust. The deal went as far as Real Property Resources obtaining a convertible mortgage on the property. Any deal for the then-344,232 square feet (31,980.2 m^{2}) center would not have included the Target store, as that retailer owns its own 101,909 square feet (9,467.7 m^{2}) store along with eight acres. Other tenants at that time included Safeway, Lamonts, Pay Less, and Seafirst Bank.

When the shopping center opened, it was blamed for many businesses moving from Downtown Hillsboro to the new center. For instance, Safeway had relocated from downtown. The Esplanade expanded in 1991, when 6,000 square feet (560 m^{2}) were added to the B building, where PETCO is today, to increase the size to 15,000 square feet (1,400 m^{2}).

In May 1992, the Kuwaiti Investment Authority through Bay 605 Corp. purchased the shopping center for almost $21 million from the developers. At that time the main tenants were J.K. Gill, Target, PayLess Drugs, and clothing retailer Lamonts. In February 2002, Bay 605 Corp. sold off the center to Pan Pacific Retail Properties for about $28.6 million. The sale included 256,000 square feet (23,800 m^{2}) of leasable space, as Target owns the property its store occupies within the 358,000 square feet (33,300 m^{2}) mall. At that time 98 percent of the mall was leased, and there were a total of ten offers on the property while it was up for sale. The center's main tenants at that time included Rite Aid, Safeway, Factory 2U, Jo-Ann Fabrics, and Petco, with Target owning their own space.

In November 2009, the back portion of the center was vandalized by three teenagers who were then charged with 32 counts of criminal mischief, among other charges, for their single night of activity. The Esplanade was the scene of a stabbing over a hat in December 2009. One man was stabbed after saying “nice hat” to another man who was wearing an Oakland Raiders cap. Owner Pan Pacific was sold to Kimco Realty Corporation in 2006, and Kimco sold off part of the mall to Israel-based BIG Group in 2010. An approximately 6,500 square feet (600 m^{2}) building was added in 2017 in the southeast corner, replacing a building that had been an oil change shop and car wash with stores such as a Jersey Mike's. A McDonald's was added to an area that had been a parking lot the next year. The center was purchased by Pine Tree in March 2022 for $65.9 million.

== Details ==
The stucco-faced center was developed by Real Property Resources Inc., based in Torrance, California. Portland-based Benner Stange Associates were the architects, while Wilsey and Ham served as the engineers. The project included $1 million in infrastructure improvements in the area, which included two new traffic signals on TV Highway. The main line of buildings runs in an east–west direction, set back from the highway.

Located at the intersection of Tualatin Valley Highway and Minter Bridge Road in southeast Hillsboro, the outdoor shopping center has a total of 260,965 square feet (24,244.4 m^{2}) of gross leasable area and 2,090 parking spaces. Target has an additional 101,909 square feet (9,467.7 m^{2}) of space within the center. The Sunset Esplanade anchor tenants are Target, Ross Stores, Rite Aid, and Safeway, while other retailers number about 30 in total. Former tenants include Jo-Ann Fabrics, Fashion Bug, El Pollo Loco, Staples, Emporium, and Tuesday Morning, amongst others.

== See also ==
- List of shopping malls in Oregon
- Shute Park Plaza
