= Mahaffey Theater =

Performing arts center in St. Petersburg, Florida, U.S.

The Mahaffey Theater Duke Energy Center for the Arts
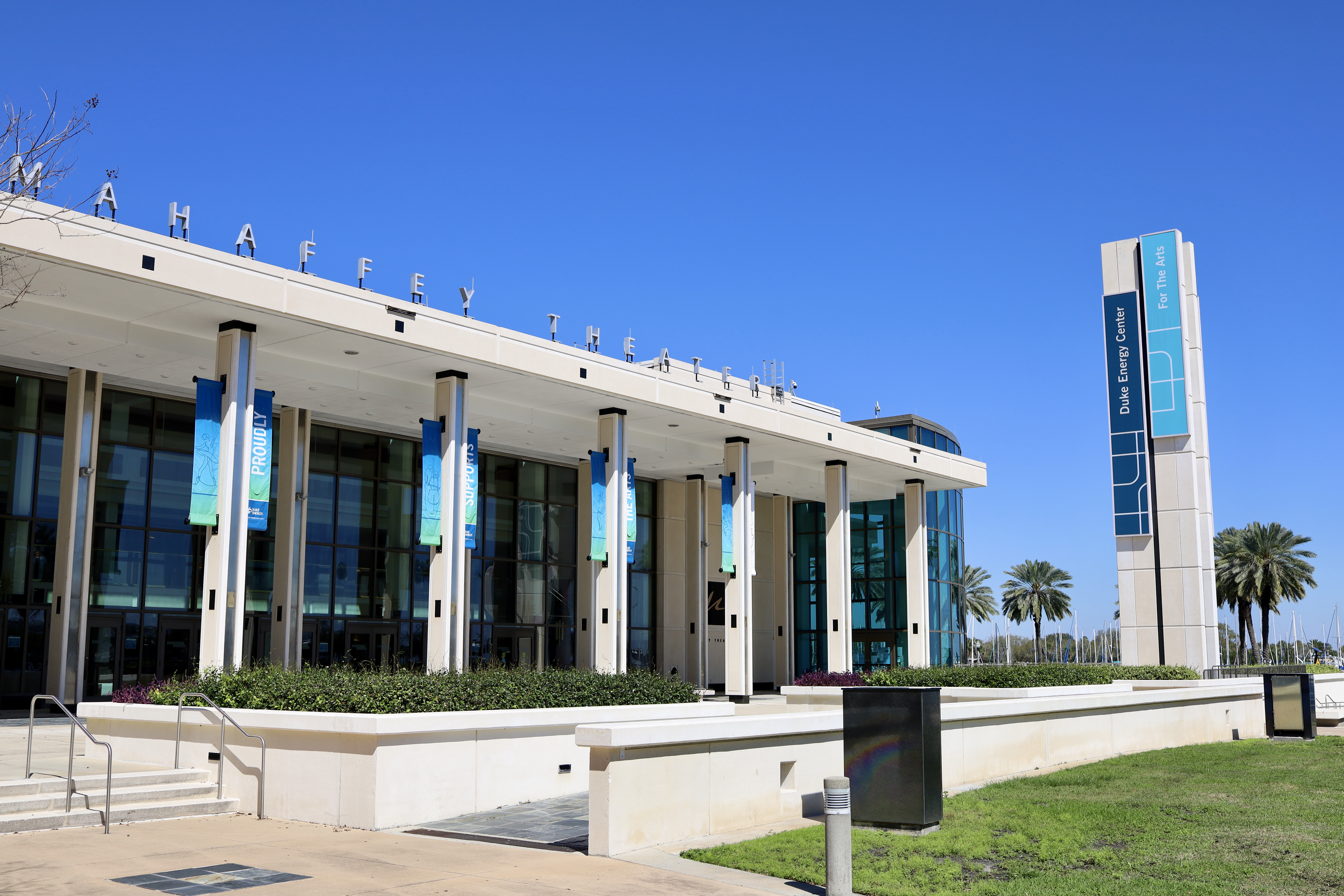
- Interactive map of The Mahaffey Theater; Duke Energy Center for the Arts
- Address: 400 First Street South; St. Petersburg, Florida; United States
- Coordinates: 27°46′2″N 82°37′55″W
- Owner: City of St. Petersburg
- Operator: Big3 Entertainment Group
- Capacity: 2,031
- Type: Performing arts center

Construction
- Opened: May 6, 1965

Website
- www.themahaffey.com

The Mahaffey Theater – Duke Energy Center for the Arts is a performing arts facility and concert hall located on the downtown waterfront in St. Petersburg, Florida. The facility first opened on May 6, 1965. The 2,031-seat facility features European box-style seating, a ballroom space and views of Tampa Bay.

The theater is close to museums such as the Salvador Dalí Museum, Museum of Fine Arts, and several beaches. The Mahaffey hosts national and international artists and performances – Broadway, classical, pop, rock, country, Americana/folk, jazz, comedy, dance and the Florida Orchestra. The Bill Edwards Foundation for the Arts, associated with the theater, supports the 'Class Acts' program, which enables school children to experience the performing arts through in-theater performances as well as in-school outreach and extension programs.

== History ==
The Mahaffey Theater first opened in May 1965 as part of the city of St. Petersburg's Bayfront Center entertainment complex. It was first renovated in 1987–1988. In 2004 the demolition of the Bayfront Arena cleared the way for a $20 million building improvement project which included renovation of 95,000 sq ft and replacement of the building's mechanical, plumbing, fire protection and electrical systems. A new three-story showcase glass atrium was designed to highlight the south and east elevations and a 4,000 sq ft addition provided a new lobby, new elevators, stairwells and public restrooms. The entire building also received new roofing and exterior stucco skin. Work also included the addition of an elevator in the adjacent parking garage and improvements to the parking lot, sidewalks and landscaping. The building was renamed The Mahaffey Theater for the Performing Arts after a local St. Petersburg family who had contributed to the building's capital campaign.

Progress Energy and the city of St. Petersburg announced a 20-year partnership in 2007 to rename the theater and the surrounding campus the Progress Energy Center for the Arts. The visual and performing arts complex includes The Mahaffey Theater, the offices of the Bill Edwards Foundation for the Arts, the Center Plaza Waterfront Park and the Salvador Dalí Museum. A merger of Progress Energy and Duke Energy in 2013 changed the facility name to the Duke Energy Center for the Arts - Mahaffey Theater.

Additional renovations undertaken since 2011 include $4 million in venue improvements, marketing and advertising and promotions by Bill Edwards, chairman and CEO of Big3 Entertainment.

A fine dining restaurant was added to the Mahaffey, Sonata, in October of 2023. It is located in a section of the Mahaffey lobby.

The Mahaffey Theater is under the management of Big3 Entertainment Group, the parent company of Big3 Records, Big3 Studios and Bill Edwards Presents, Inc., located in St. Petersburg, Florida.

== Events ==
The theater was the site of the 1996 vice presidential debate between Al Gore and Jack Kemp.

In 2003, The Mahaffey hosted 234 performances that drew 169,000 paid visitors. In addition to the Florida Orchestra's performances, its top-grossing productions were Riverdance, which appeared for five days, drew an audience of 5,931 and produced a net revenue of $18,884, and the three-day Miss Florida Pageant, which brought in 2,661 people and netted $11,043. Elvis' Birthday Bash came in fifth with 1,280 in the audience and $5,183 in revenues.

In 2007, The Mahaffey was scheduled to host the September 17 nationally televised presidential Republican Party primary debate, but the majority of candidates had scheduling issues and could not attend. Instead, the debate at Mahaffey took place on November 28, 2007.
