= IPIC Theaters =

Luxury dine-in movie theater operator in the USA

IPIC Theaters, LLC
- Trade name: IPIC Theaters
- Industry: Entertainment
- Founded: 2010; 16 years ago
- Founder: Hamid Hashemi
- Headquarters: Boca Raton, Florida, United States
- Number of locations: 13 (2026)
- Website: www.ipic.com

IPIC Theaters is an American chain of luxury dine-in movie theaters. The company currently operates 13 locations across the United States, with 8 of them including dine-in restaurants.

== History ==
iPic Entertainment was founded in 2010 by Hamid Hashemi in Boca Raton, Florida after acquiring another cinema chain, Gold Class Cinemas, and converting the name to the iPic brand. Hashemi previously worked managed another theater chain, Muvico Theaters, before he was laid off in 2006 after a failed attempt to purchase the company. By 2011, the chain had announced that sales and attendance were noticeably profitable, with plans for expansion within the next few years.

In October 2014, iPic Entertainment launched iPic Media, and stated that the new company would mainly rely on "strategic partnerships with upscale brands in the travel and leisure, beauty, fashion, financial, technology and automotive sectors to bring engaging content and seamless brand integration to iPic's sought-out members and guests, an audience that is at the pinnacle of the "influencers" marketing pyramid."

In 2015, iPic sued Regal Cinemas and AMC Theatres, claiming that the two companies used their "market power" in an effort to "squeeze out" one of the company's theaters in Houston, as well as one unopened location near the Dallas-Fort Worth metropolitan area. They also claimed that Regal and AMC told movie studios to not play any movies licensed to iPic. By May 2016, it was announced that the case would go to trial by October 3, 2016, after AMC unsuccessfully attempted to get the court to dismiss the case. In 2022, a judge ruled in favor of AMC and Regal after finding a lack of evidence showing that the two companies committed conspiracy against iPic.

In October 2016, the company signed a deal with Netflix to premiere 10 of their movies in their theaters alongside their streaming release dates.

In August 2017, iPic stated that it intended to file for a "Regulation A+" initial public offering by the fall of 2017, in an effort to raise up to $30 million in cash. The company closed its IPO on February 1, 2018, and began publicly trading on the Nasdaq, trading at $18.50 a share. In November 2018, the company released plans to open their first international location by 2019, located in Riyadh, Saudi Arabia. These plans were later scrapped once iPic filed for bankruptcy.

On August 5, 2019, iPic filed for Chapter 11 bankruptcy protection with plans to sell itself and assets. Hashemi blamed developmental delays and rising capital cost as a result of the decision. The company's stock had fallen over 90% to just 85 cents per share since it began trading on the Nasdaq, as well as a sales and attendance decline by around 21.7%. The company further noted that it also planned to eliminate debt and strengthen its balance sheet while keeping its 16 theaters open. By November 2019, the company had emerged from Chapter 11 bankruptcy after eliminating debt and strengthening its balance sheet. iPic Entertainment's assets were sold to IPIC Theaters, LLC for an undisclosed amount.

On February 25, 2026, it was reported that IPIC Theaters had filed for Chapter 11 bankruptcy protection for a second time.
