= Salem Center (Oregon) =

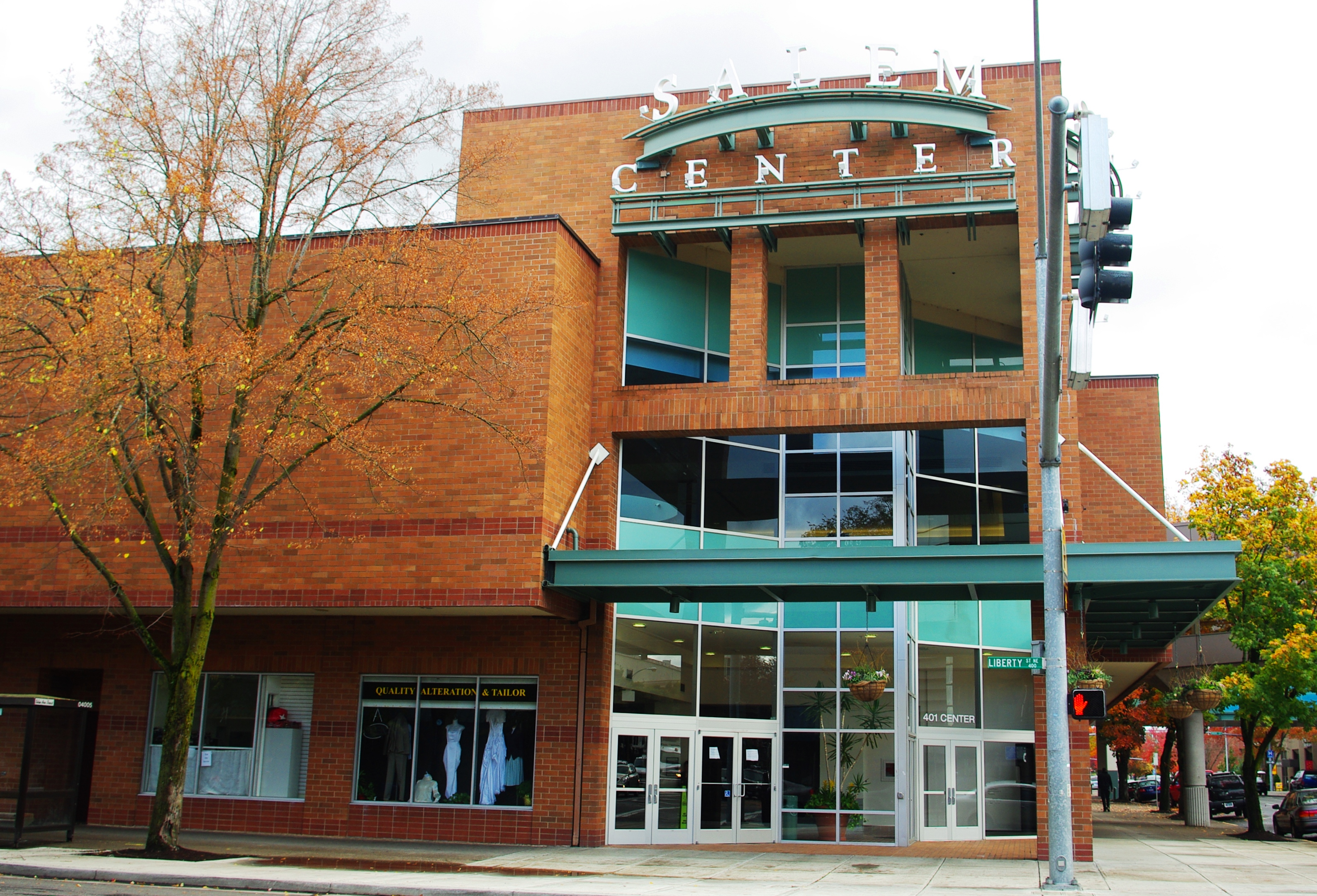
- Mall entrance
- Location: Salem, Oregon, United States
- Coordinates: 44.943°N 123.036°W
- Opened: 1979
- Manager: OGSC2, LLC
- Num. of stores: 60
- Num. of anchor tenants: 1 (1 open, 1 vacant, 1 coming soon, Nordstrom Demolished in 2022, Macy's Closed 2025, Furniture store opening in former JCPenney in 2026)
- Floor area: 650,000 square feet (60,000 m^{2}) (GLA)
- Floors: 2 (3 in former JCPenney, 4 in former Macy's)
- Parking: 5,200
- Website: www.salemcenter.com

Salem Center is a multi-building, enclosed shopping center in downtown Salem, Oregon, United States. Located on both sides of Center Street between High and Liberty streets, the mall has 80 stores and a food court. Opened in 1979, the mall has three anchor stores with 650,000 square feet (60,000 m^{2}) of gross leasable space located on and two floors. The anchors are: Kohl's and Ross Dress for Less. There is one vacant anchor last occupied by Macy's. The former JCPenney space is currently under development to be turned into a furniture store with an expected opening date in 2026. There are also plans to convert the former JCPenney into multiple other tenants. The mall also features five sky bridges, one of which connects Macy's to the mall, another connects the mall to an adjacent city-owned parking garage, with another connecting the former JCPenney to the mall, in addition to connecting the two mall buildings across Center Street. Salem Center is owned and managed by OGSC2, LLC.

== Early history ==
Salem Center's roots can be traced back to 1955, when Meier & Frank opened a two-level department store and parking garage, which was the first branch location in the chain. Lipman's opened a three-level department store in 1956 at the corner of Chemeketa and Liberty, the first of their chain. JCPenney also opened a two-level store nearby, opposite to Lipman's in 1965. While those three stores were originally designed as freestanding buildings, they eventually became integrated into the later mall development as anchor stores, and were connected to the mall via skybridges.

== Mall development history ==
Construction began on the new shopping center in 1978. Salem Center then opened in 1979, the same time Lipman's would be acquired by Seattle-based Frederick & Nelson. Salem Center was remodeled in 1988 and again in 1995. Until approximately 2004 the mall was known as Salem Centre. The Kohl's location was previously a Mervyns store until 2007, while Macy's location is a converted Meier & Frank with the name change in 2006. The mall launched a service in January 2008 that allowed people to search all products offered by the mall's stores, claiming to be the first mall in Oregon to have such a service. In 2009, the center started an annual tradition of having a Lego menorah built and lighted to celebrate Hanukkah.

In 1986, Frederick & Nelson closed the Salem Center store along with the former Lipman's in Downtown Portland.

On January 31, 2018, it was announced that Nordstrom would be closing in April 2018.

On June 4, 2020, JCPenney announced that this location would also be closing on October 18, 2020 as part of a plan to close 154 stores nationwide. Rue 21 closed in 2023.

On March 1, 2024 Salem Center was purchased by OGSC2, LLC, ending a 5 year period of ownership by Rialto Capital Management.

On August 29, 2024 the adjacent Macy's property was acquired by OGSC Macy's LLC which will be redeveloped and incorporated into the Salem Center regional entertainment district.

On January 9, 2025, it was announced that Macy's would close by March 2025 as part of a plan to close 66 stores nationwide. Macy's closed on March 23, 2025.

in April, 2026, plans were announced to convert the former JCPenney anchor space into a furniture store. While a name has not yet been set, the furniture store plans to utilize the 11,070-square-foot first-floor space of the former JCPenney space and open sometime later in 2026. There are also plans to convert the rest of the available anchor space into multiple other tenants. Plans are currently ongoing and awaiting approval.

== See also ==
- List of shopping malls in Oregon
- Lancaster Mall
