= Woodburn Premium Outlets =

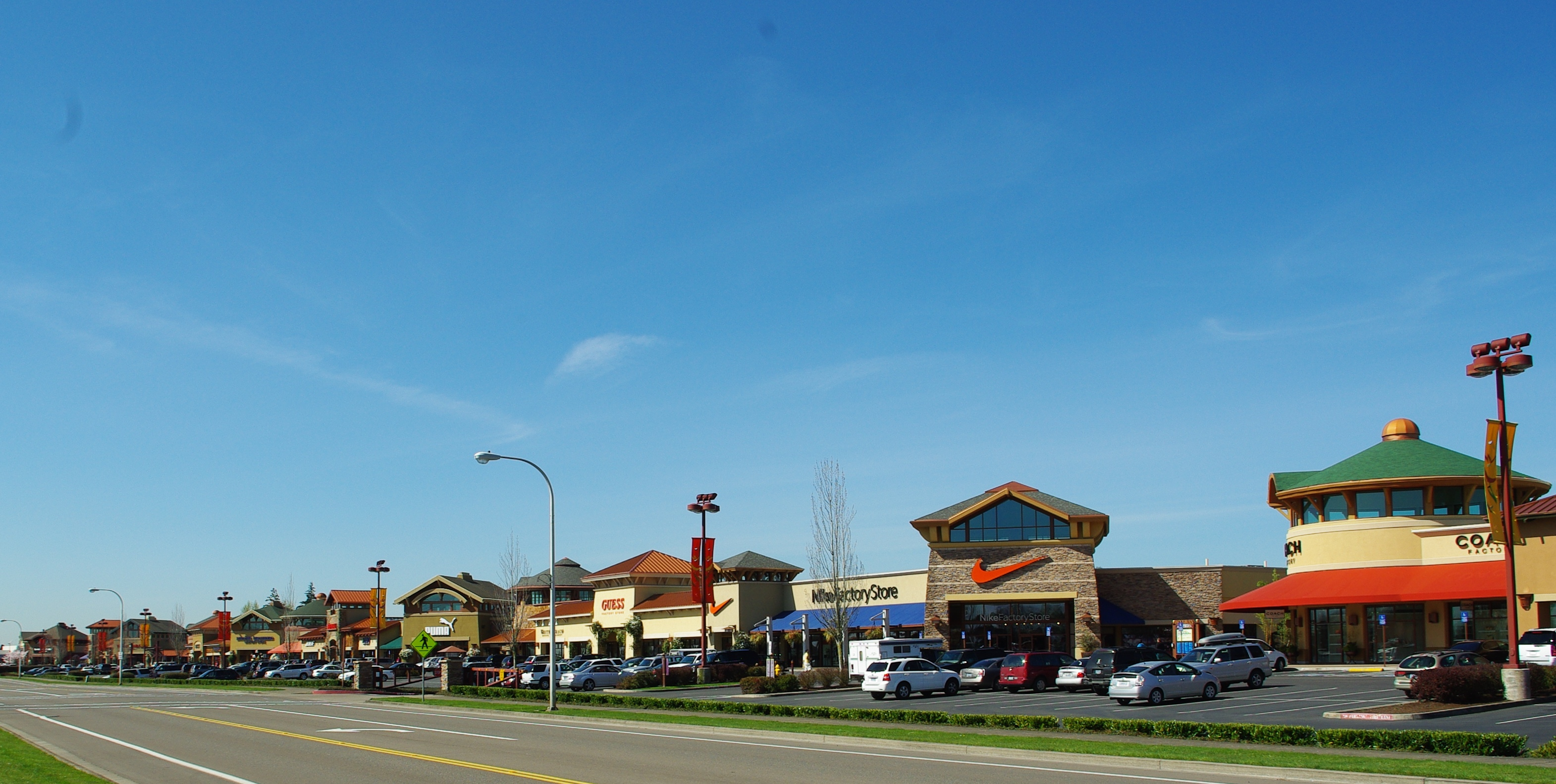
- Woodburn Company Stores entrance
- Location: Woodburn, Oregon, United States
- Coordinates: 45.156138°N 122.878561°W
- Opened: August 1999; 27 years ago
- Developer: Craig Realty Group
- Manager: Simon's Premium Outlets
- Owner: Simon Property Group
- Num. of stores: 114
- Num. of anchor tenants: 13
- Floor area: 350,292 square feet (32,543.2 m^{2}) (GLA)
- Floors: 1
- Website: http://www.premiumoutlets.com/outlet/woodburn

Woodburn Premium Outlets is an outlet mall in Woodburn, Oregon, United States. The complex, located between the cities of Portland and Salem on Interstate 5, opened in 1999 as the Woodburn Company Stores. Owned and operated by Simon Property Group, the center has over 350,000 square feet (33,000 m^{2}) of retail space.

== History ==
Initially costing $20 million, Woodburn Company Stores opened with 243,000 square feet (22,600 m^{2}) of retail space in August 1999. The center was expanded by 66,500 square feet (6,180 m^{2}) of space which opened in November 2003. An additional 23,700 square feet (2,200 m^{2}) added in November 2005 cost $1.6 million and included Nike, Inc. as an anchor to the outlet mall. The complex was a target of a large shoplifting ring in 2006. Between the Memorial Day and Labor Day weekends in 2007, a shuttle bus service called the Woodburn Outlet Express ran from the Portland Union Bank of California, the Portland Hilton Hotel, the Lake Oswego Hilton Garden Inn, to the mall and back. Round-trip fare was $20. After low demand during that trial period, the service was discontinued.

The center added another 27,402 square feet (2,545.7 m^{2}) of space costing $5.1 million opened in February 2009. Its last expansion, consisting of public restrooms and 16 retail spaces, broke ground in February 2012 and opened seven months later. Costing $10 million, it added 38,569 square feet (3,583.2 m^{2}) for a final total area of 388,378 square feet (36,081.5 m^{2}) for the center. The company S.D. Deacon has been the general contractor of the mall's construction during all phases. For the Christmas holiday shopping season in 2012, the center reached 100% occupancy. In 2012, the center had its highest total of visitors in its history, with 4.5 million people visiting the center. Simon Property Group bought the center in June 2013 from developer Craig Realty Group and changed the name from Woodburn Company Stores to Woodburn Premium Outlets.

The outlet is the largest tax-free shopping outlet in the Western United States. It is one of Oregon's most popular tourist attractions with 4.4 million visitors recorded in 2011.

== See also ==
- List of shopping malls in Oregon
