= Willamette Town Center =

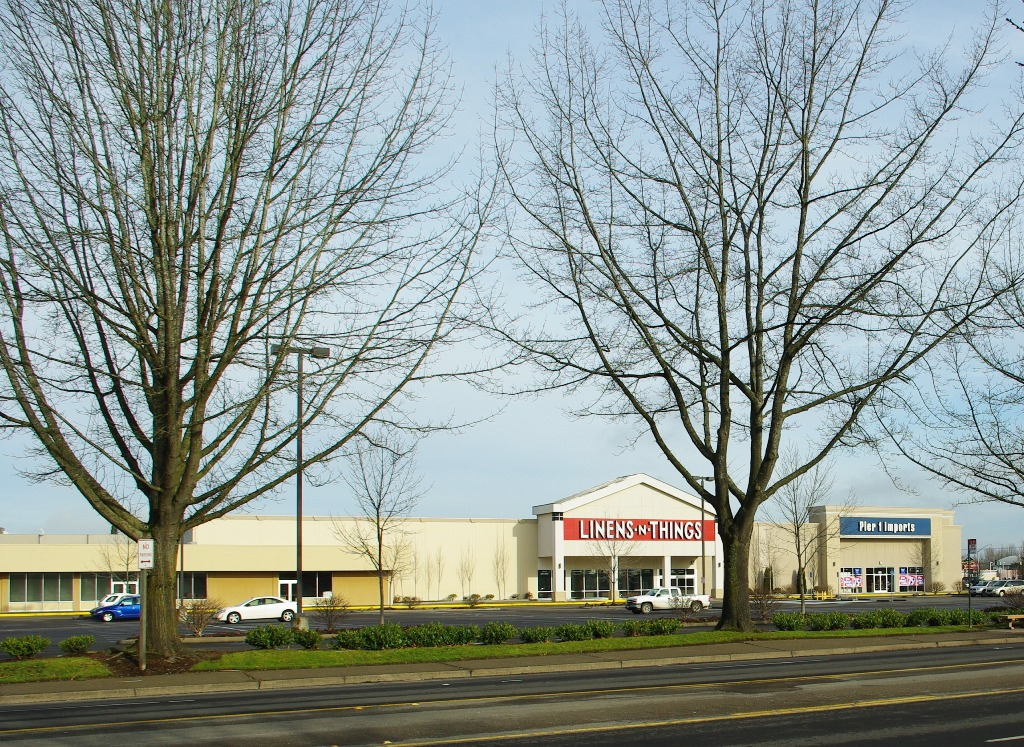
- South side of the mall
- Location: Salem, Oregon, United States
- Coordinates: 44.94180°N 122.98650°W
- Opened: 1968
- Developer: Thrifty PayLess
- Manager: C. E. John Company
- Num. of stores: 80
- Num. of anchor tenants: 8
- Floor area: 648,990 sq ft (60,293 m^{2}) (GLA), includes outlying retailers
- Floors: 1
- Parking: 3,523
- Website: www.willamettetowncenter.com

Willamette Town Center, formerly Lancaster Mall, is an exterior entrance shopping center located in Salem, Oregon, United States. Opened in 1971, the main part of the center has 550,000 square feet (51,000 m^{2}) of space. The regional mall is located on Lancaster Drive and is bordered on the West by Interstate 5, making Willamette Town Center a retail hub for the city of Salem.

== History ==
Lancaster Mall began in 1968 when Thrifty PayLess built a small enclosed mall in Salem, Oregon, featuring a PayLess drug store and Albertsons supermarket. Two years later, the rest of the mall was built. Montgomery Ward then moved from downtown Salem to the newly renovated mall. In 1972, the mall was to be one of the first locations in Oregon for an automated teller machine not located at a bank branch, which created controversy at the time. About 1976, the Taco Time chain experimented with selling alcoholic beverages at their Lancaster location.

A 17-year-old woman was kidnapped from Lancaster Mall in 1977, as was a 19-year-old woman in 1982. In May 1982, an ex-Salem police officer shot and killed two people at the mall before killing himself in the parking lot. The mall banned the Salvation Army from soliciting there in 1988 in an effort to uniformly ban all solicitations at the mall.

In 2008 Lancaster Mall achieved EarthWISE Certification through Marion County Public Works-Environmental Services. Lancaster Mall has committed to recycling, reducing waste, saving energy, conserving water and practice environmentally preferable purchasing in their operations.

The mall was renamed Willamette Town Center in 2017. As part of the renaming, HomeGoods, Sierra Trading Post, and Hobby Lobby were added. A portion of the indoor mall corridor leading to the closed Macy's store was also closed as the new stores took over the space as inline tenants and feature outside entrances only.

On October 15, 2018, it was announced that Sears would be closing as part of a plan to close 142 stores nationwide.

Pier 1 Imports, which operates a store by the former Sears, announced in May 2020 that they were closing all locations and going out of business.

== See also ==
- List of shopping malls in Oregon
- Salem Center
