= Bill Edwards (businessman) =

American businessman (1945–2026)

William L. Edwards
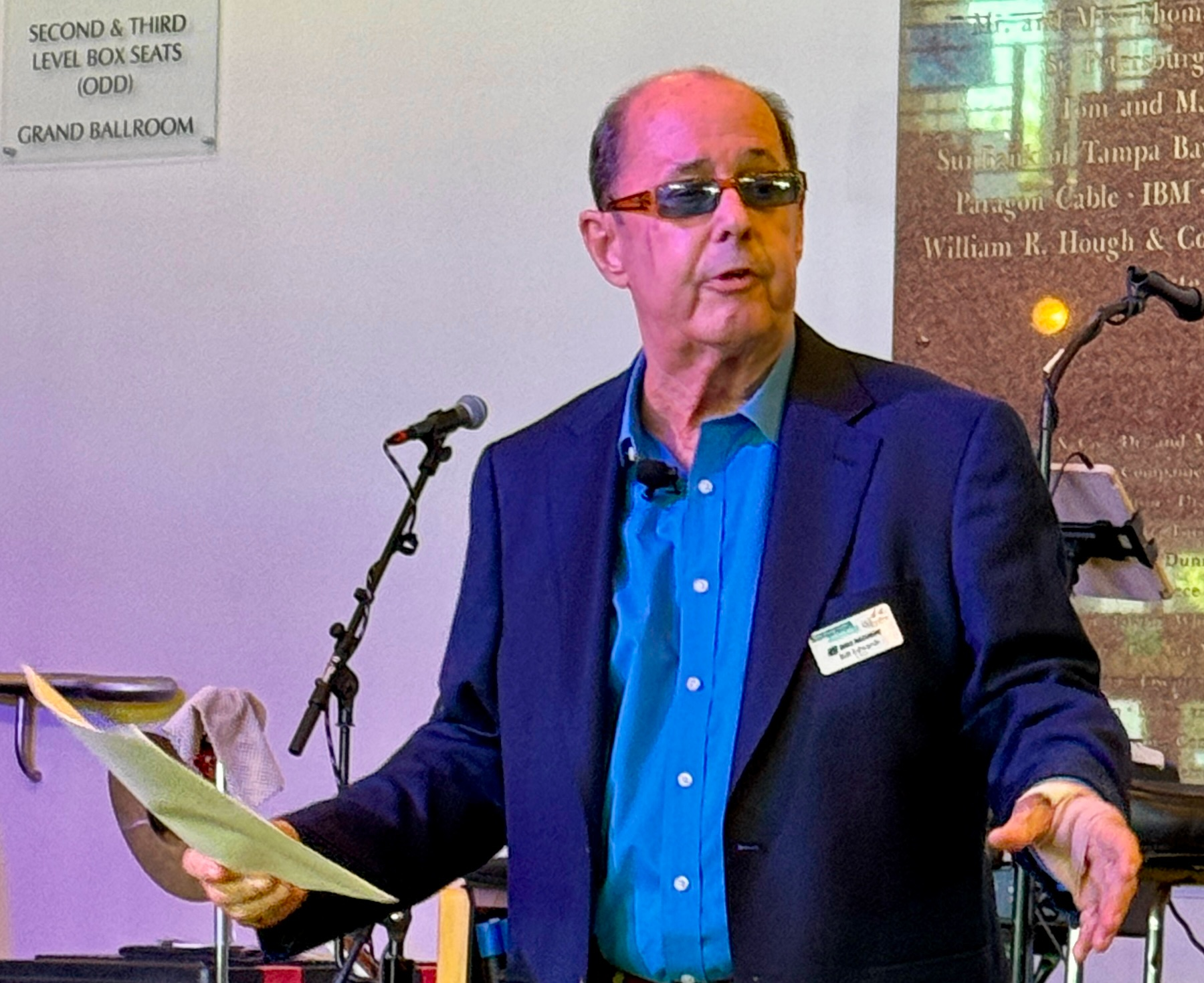
- Born: Edward Francis Sylvia; January 27, 1945
- Died: August 27, 2026 (aged 81)
- Occupations: Real estate developer, sports team owner/executive

William Larry Edwards (born Edward Francis Sylvia; January 27, 1945 – August 27, 2026) was an American businessman. He owned numerous properties in St. Petersburg, Florida.

== Background ==
Bill Edwards was born on January 27, 1945, and grew up in New Bedford, Massachusetts. He served in the United States Marine Corps during the Vietnam War, earning a Purple Heart. After the war, he moved to Detroit and entered the mortgage business. Born Edward Francis Sylvia III, he changed his name to William Larry Edwards when he moved to Detroit.

Edwards died on August 27, 2026, at the age of 81, from multiple organ failure and pneumonia.

== Philanthropy ==
Edwards regularly gave to charities in and around the Tampa Bay area.

In 2010, Edwards donated $2.5 million to All Children's Hospital. The funds were designated for the endowment of the hospital's music therapy program and the re-establishment of a music therapy student internship program. Additionally, the donation supported the expansion of programming and access to the GetWellNetwork patient education and information system via bedside televisions.

In 2011, Bill Edwards established his own non-profit organization, the Bill Edwards Foundation for the Arts, with an initial donation of $1 million. This funding has allowed the foundation to expand and present over 340 culturally diverse shows annually, with approximately 75% of these performances selling out. By 2024, more than 240,000 schoolchildren had participated in activities sponsored by the foundation. In 2025 he received the Tampa Bay Lightning Hero Award. Edwards was given a $50,000 donation from the Lightning Foundation and the Lightning Community Hero program. The full amount went to his foundation to support transportation for students attending the Mahaffey Youth Field Trips.

== Business activity ==
=== Real-estate ===
In 2009, Edwards purchased the Treasure Island Yacht Club for $15 million. Then later in 2022, he would sell the club for $15 million again. He cited a zoning dispute as the reason for the sale.

The Baywalk retail plaza was struggling and went up for sale in 2011. Bill Edwards purchased it for $5.2 million and had it renamed to Sundial. It went under construction and would open with a new floor with new fine dining restaurants. Eleven years later, Edwards would then sell Sundial for $27.5 million. Edwards invested somewhere between $30 and $40 million into Sundial during his ownership.

Edwards purchased the "Tropicana Block" in 2014 for a price of $12 million, paid in cash.

In early 2021, Bill Edwards sold one of his two houses on Snell Isle for $5.35 million. This property was a guest home and had a footprint of over eight thousand square feet, with 5 bedrooms, 3 bathrooms, and 2 half bathrooms. Before the sale, the combination of this guest house and the other next-door property was valued at nearly $20 million.

=== Arts ===
Big3 Entertainment was founded by Bill Edwards in 2000. This company would include a record label and a studio. This studio would be used by notable acts like AC/DC, J. Cole, and Cheap Trick.

Big3 Entertainment won the right to manage the Mahaffey Theater in 2011 after promising over $2 million in renovations. Bill would later set up the "Bill Edwards Foundation for the Arts" which hosts many events for school children throughout the year. In 2023 the Mahaffey would open up a fine dining restaurant, Sonata.

=== Mortgage Investors Corp. ===
Edwards served as president of Mortgage Investors Corp., which the Tampa Bay Times described as the "nation's largest VA mortgage lender" in 2005. In 2013, the Edwards-owned Mortgage Investors was fined $7.5 million for violating the federal do not call list. That same year, Edwards negotiated a sale of Mortgage Investors to HomeBancorp, but the deal was never completed. After the failure of the deal, Mortgage Investors stopped making new home loans and laid off the majority of its staff. In 2015, two mortgage brokers that never did any business with MIC sued Edwards, alleging that Mortgage Investors had defrauded veteran home buyers and the United States Department of Veterans Affairs.

=== Sports ===
In 2013, Edwards bought a controlling interest in the second-tier Tampa Bay Rowdies soccer club, then playing in the North American Soccer League. The team has played in the United Soccer League since 2017. Edwards hoped to move the Rowdies up to Major League Soccer, the league above the USL. He operated Al Lang Stadium for the city of St. Petersburg, and owned the nearby McNulty Station parking garage and a Rowdies-themed bar and restaurant. In October 2018, it was announced that Edwards had sold the club to Tampa Bay Rays, the area's Major League Baseball franchise, who announced plans to purchase the Rowdies and assume control of Al Lang Stadium.

In November 2016, Edwards filed a complaint against the Rowdies' arch-rival, Fort Lauderdale Strikers' holding company, Miami FC, LLC, over money loaned to the struggling club. Edwards claimed that the team had failed to pay him back $300,000 in loans. He sought damages and foreclosure on Fort Lauderdale's assets in the lawsuit. A signed promissory note showed that the collateral put up to secure the loans included the team's patents, copyrights, trademarks, rights to use of the name "Fort Lauderdale Strikers" along with other tangible assets.

In May 2017 Edwards was awarded a summary judgment in the case, and after a June 2017 public sale, gained control of the copyrights, trademarks and any rights to the use of the name "Fort Lauderdale Strikers" or any variation for $5,100. He had yet to announce what he planned to do with the Strikers brand.

=== Political activities ===
Edwards donated $1 million to the campaign of Florida Governor Rick Scott and $4.6 million to the 2012 Republican National Convention. He donated $350,000 to the presidential candidacy of Jeb Bush.
