= List of shopping malls in Oregon =

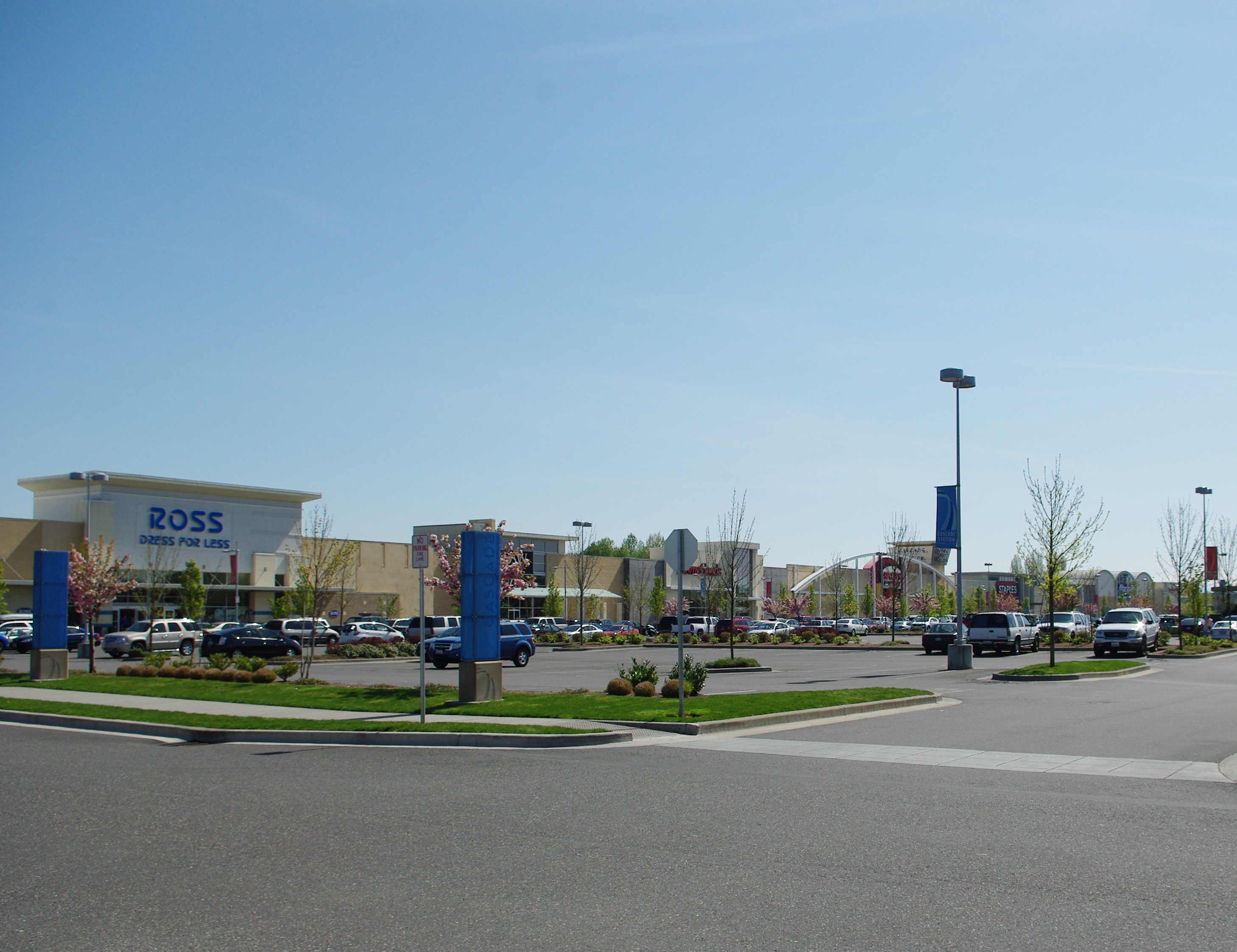
Cascade Station in Portland

This is an incomplete list of currently existing shopping centers and malls in the U.S. state of Oregon.

== Portland metro area ==
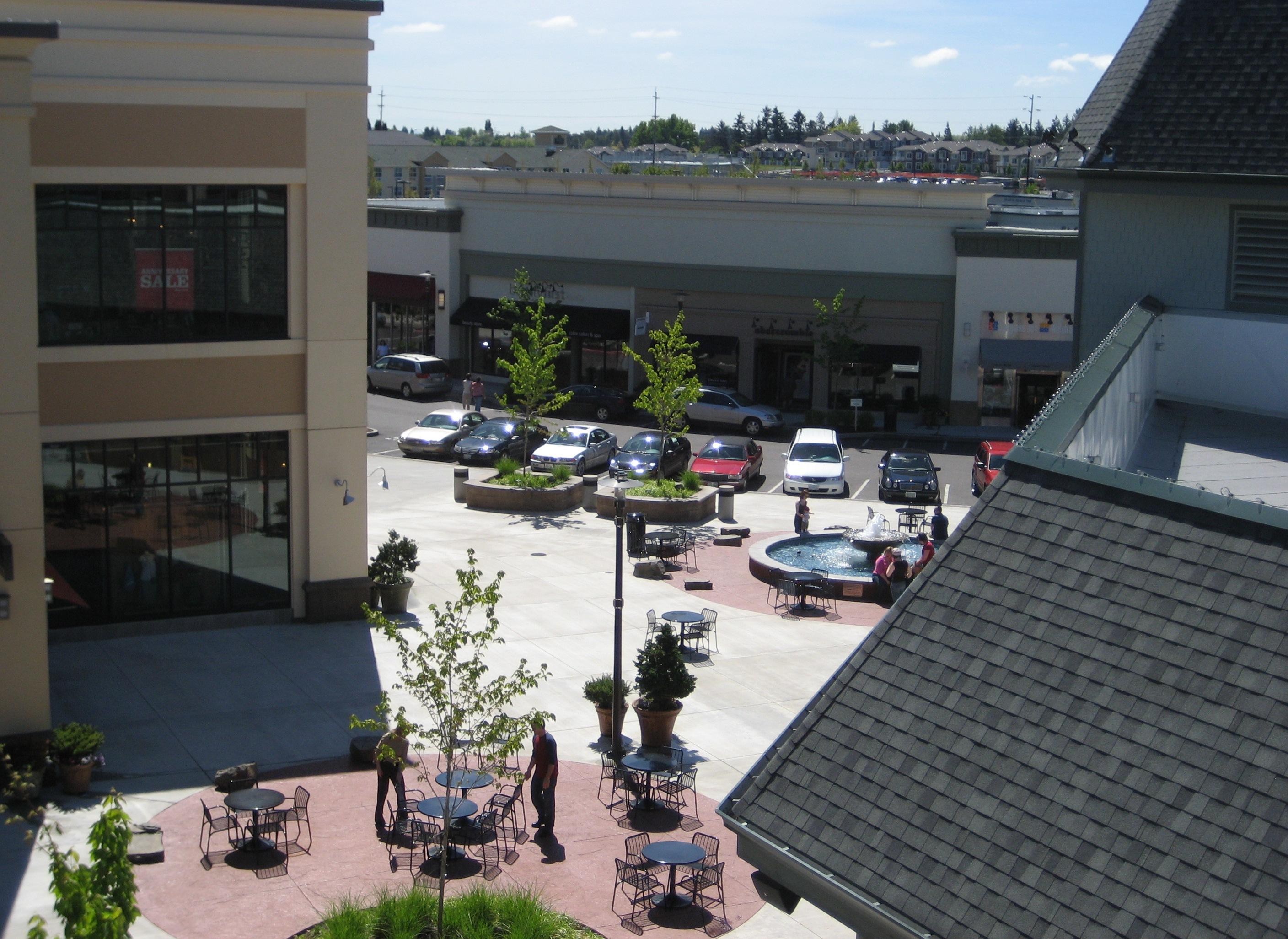
The Streets of Tanasbourne in Hillsboro

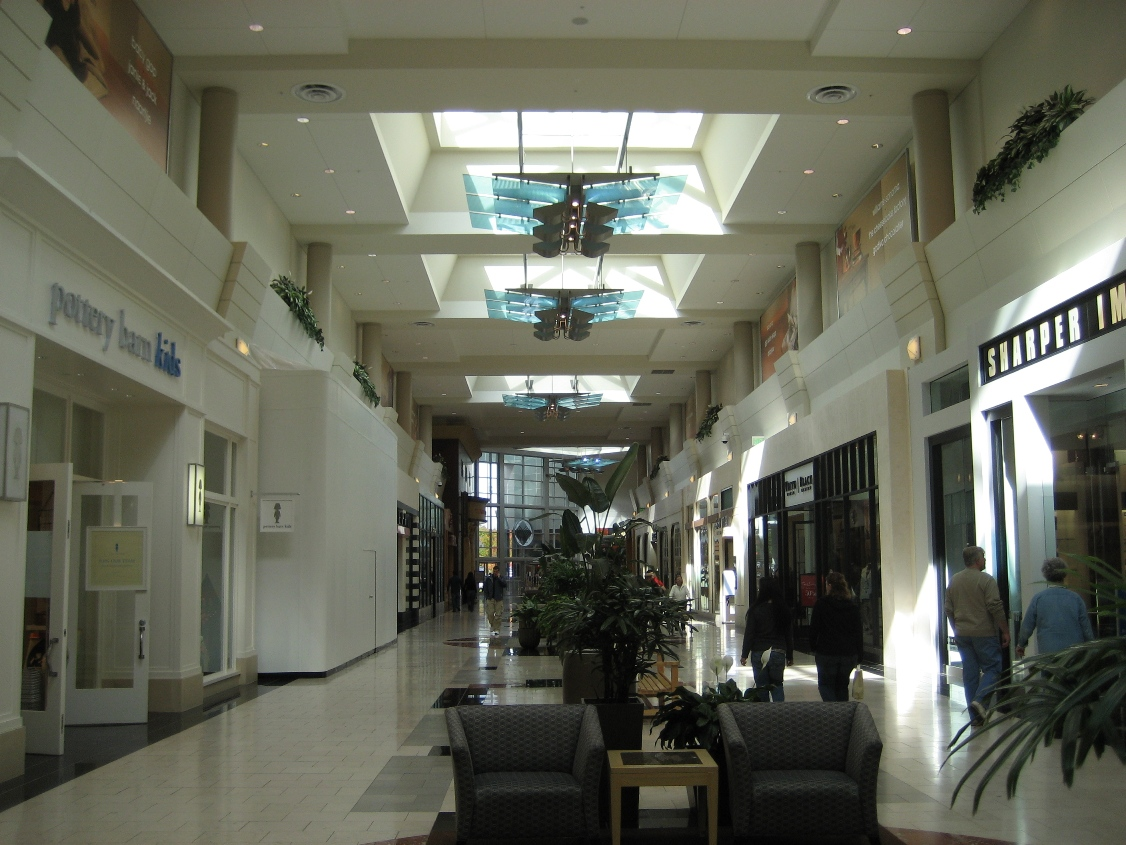
Inside Washington Square in Tigard

Shopping centers in the Portland metropolitan area:

Name	City	Year opened	Stores	Retail floor area, sq. ft	References
Bridgeport Village	Tigard; Tualatin	2005	82	465,000	
Cascade Station	NE Portland	2007	25	400,000	
Cedar Hills Crossing	Beaverton	1969	80	750,000	
Clackamas Town Center	Clackamas	1981	155	1,230,000	
Clackamas Promenade	Clackamas	1989	30		
Columbia Gorge Outlets	Troutdale		29		
Eastport Plaza	SE Portland	1960		406,661	
Fubonn Shopping Center	SE Portland	2006	29	465,000	
Gresham Town Fair	Gresham		31		
Jantzen Beach Center	N Portland	1972	39	746,414	
Lloyd Center	NE Portland	1960	65	1,472,000	
Mall 205	SE Portland	1970	29	477,000	
Milwaukie Marketplace	Milwaukie		22		
Nyberg Woods	Tualatin		25		
Pioneer Place	Downtown Portland	1990	35	369,000	
Progress Ridge Town Square	Beaverton	2011	30		
The Streets of Tanasbourne	Hillsboro	2004	41	368,000	
Sunset Esplanade	Hillsboro	1989	35	362,874	
Washington Square	Tigard	1973	167	1,458,734	

== Willamette Valley ==
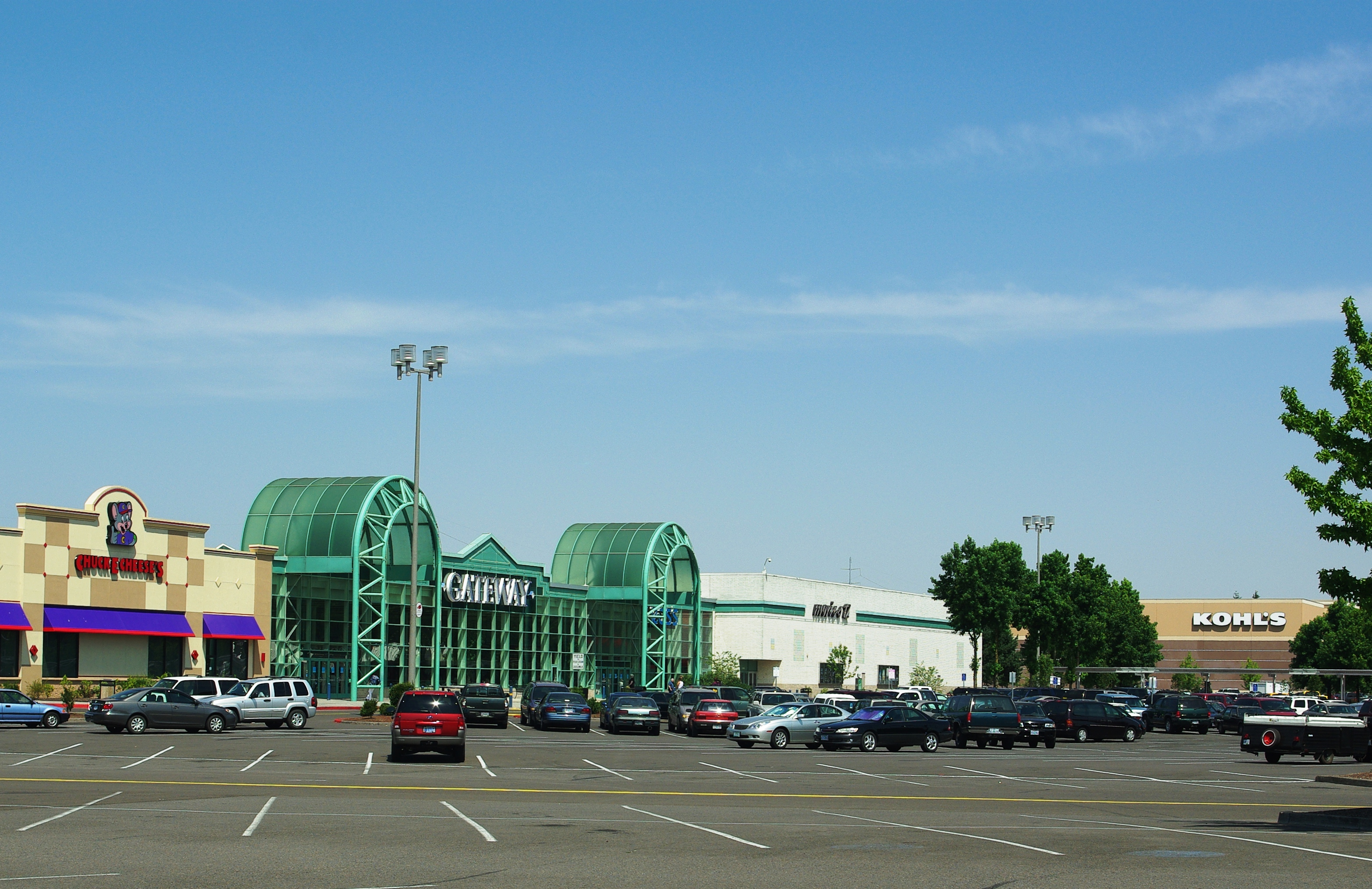
Gateway Mall

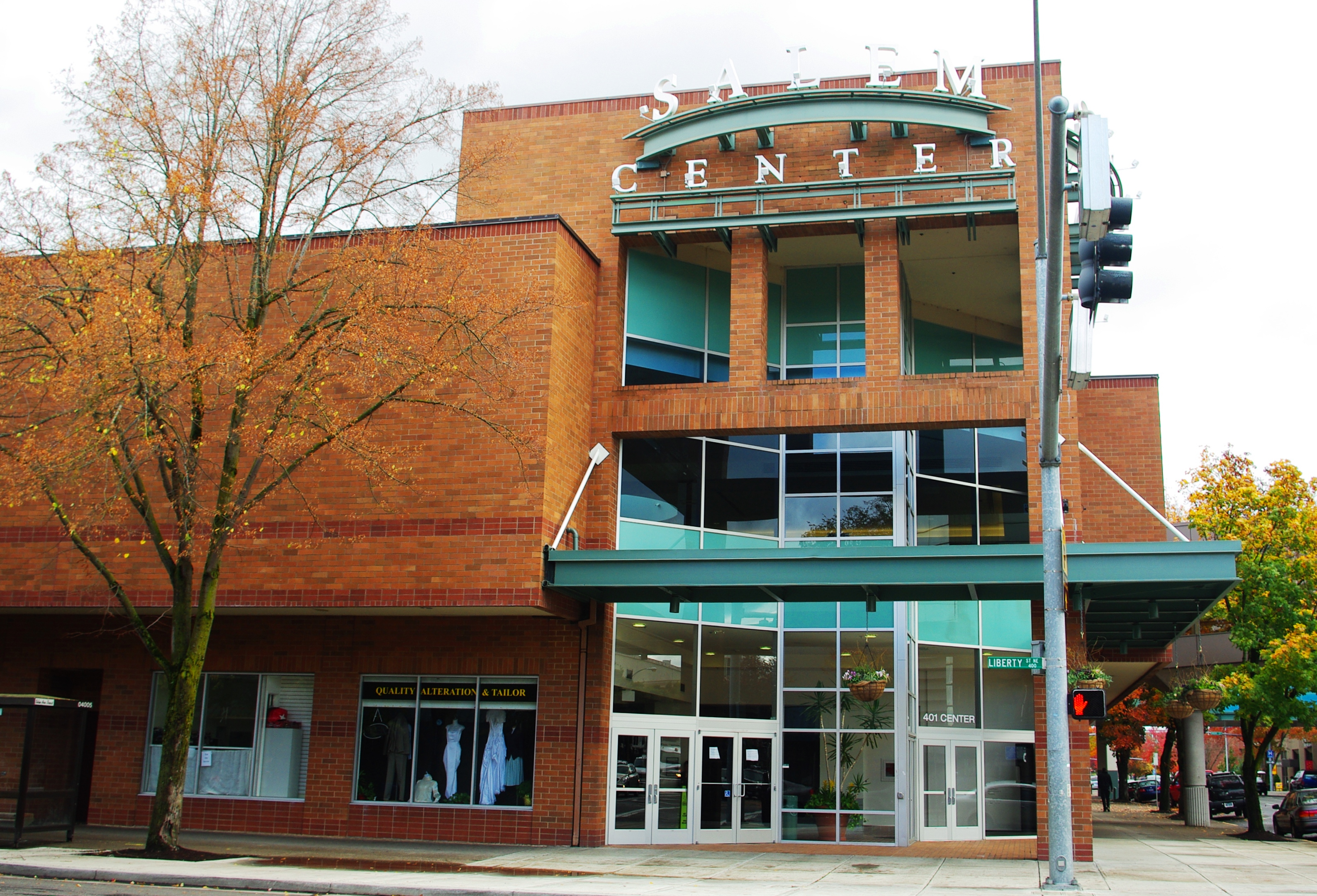
Salem Center

Shopping centers in the Willamette Valley (excludes those in the Portland area):

Name	City	Year opened	Stores	References
The Shoppes at Gateway	Springfield	1990 (Heavy Remodel 2014)	?	
Oakway Center	Eugene	1960s (heavily remodeled 1995)	42	
Heritage Mall	Albany	1988		
Willamette Town Center	Salem	1971	80+	
Salem Center	Salem	1979	80	
Valley River Center	Eugene	1969	130	
Woodburn Premium Outlets	Woodburn	1999	114	
Keizer Station	Keizer	2006		

== Rogue Valley ==
Shopping centers in the Rogue Valley:

Name	City	Year opened	Stores	References
Ashland Shopping Center	Ashland			
Bear Creek Plaza	Medford		28	
Claycombs Plaza Mall	Ashland			
Grants Pass Shopping Center	Grants Pass	1966		
Northgate Marketplace	NW Medford	2012		
Rogue Valley Mall	NW Medford	1986	100+	
The Village at Medford Center	NE Medford	1959	~50	
Shoppes At Exit 24	Phoenix		20+	

== Other areas ==
Name	City	Year opened	Stores	References
Bend Factory Stores	Bend	1990s	22	
Bend River Promenade	Bend			
Cascade Village Shopping Center	Bend			
Lincoln City Outlets	Lincoln City		49	
Old Mill District	Bend	c. 1992	35 +	
Pony Village Mall	North Bend	1960	40+	
Roseburg Valley Mall	Roseburg	1981	40+	
Seaside Factory Outlets	Seaside		26	
The Village at Sunriver	Sunriver	c. 1980	34+	

== See also ==
- Lists of Oregon-related topics
