= Muvico Theaters =

Defunct American movie theater chain

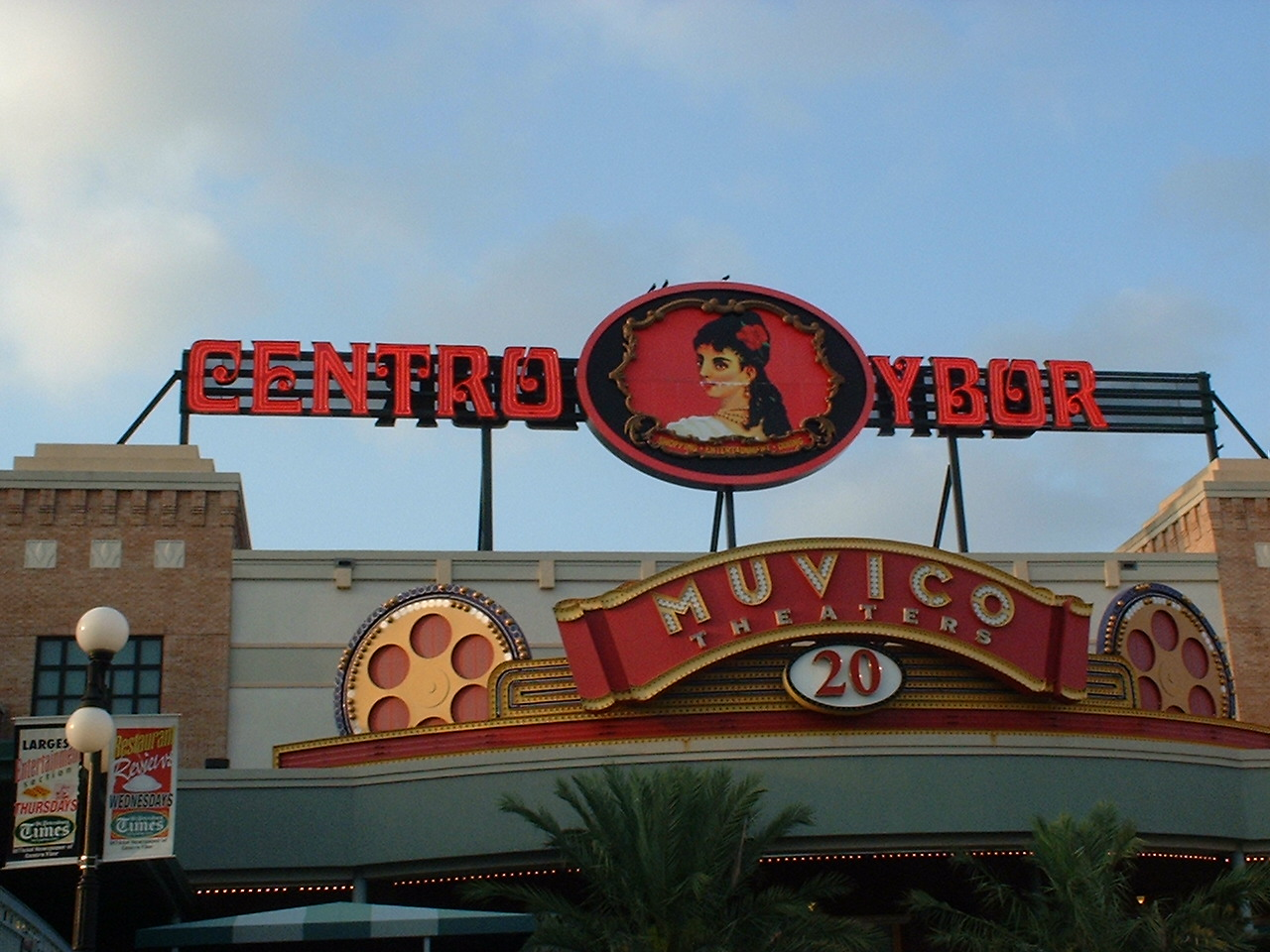
- The Muvico 20-screen theater complex in Ybor City, downtown Tampa, Florida
- Type: Private company
- Founded: 1984 in Coral Springs, Florida
- Defunct: 2017
- Fate: Acquired by AMC Theatres
- Successor: AMC Theatres
- Headquarters: Oakland Park, Florida

Muvico Theaters was a movie theater chain headquartered in Fort Lauderdale, Florida. Muvico had seven complexes in Florida, one in the Chicago metropolitan area (Rosemont), and one in Thousand Oaks, California. Muvico's theaters were known for the use of decorative themes at several theaters, such as the Egyptian, 1950s drive-in, French opera house, Mediterranean palace, and 1920s grand movie palace themes.

== Corporate history ==
Muvico Theaters started in 1984 by Hamid Hashemi, Iranian-born entrepreneur, with the acquisition of the Movie Center 3 theater in Coral Springs, Florida. Between 1985 and 1995, Muvico bought or built eight theaters totaling 59 screens; the California Club Six in North Miami was among these eight theaters. However, in 1995, Muvico sold all of its theaters and three leases, except for the Palm Harbor 10 located in Palm Harbor, Florida. The purpose of that sale was to allow Muvico to operate more efficiently against its competition – namely, Regal Entertainment Group, Cinemark, and AMC Theatres.

A year later, Muvico bought five theaters from United Artist Theaters (now owned by Regal Entertainment Group) in South and Central Florida, totaling 43 screens. Muvico built its first themed megaplex theater in 1998 in Orlando; it is called Muvico Pointe 21 with a "book of dreams" theme. They subsequently opened an 18-screen theater in Pompano Beach, Florida with a 50's drive in theme, and a 24-screen megaplex in Davie, Florida with the Egyptian theme.

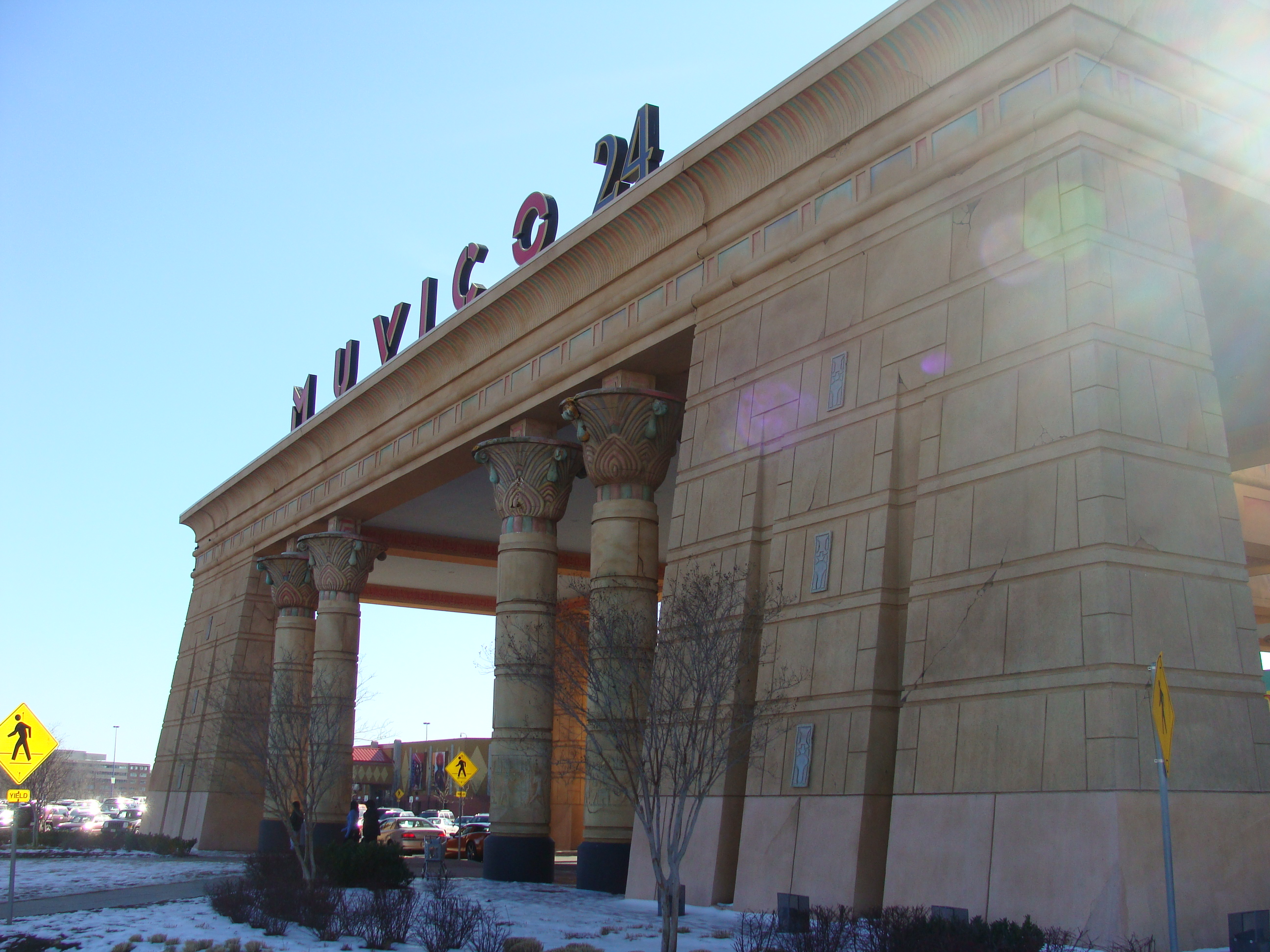
Entrance to the Egyptian-themed Muvico located at Arundel Mills in Maryland. This theater was sold to Cinemark in 2009.

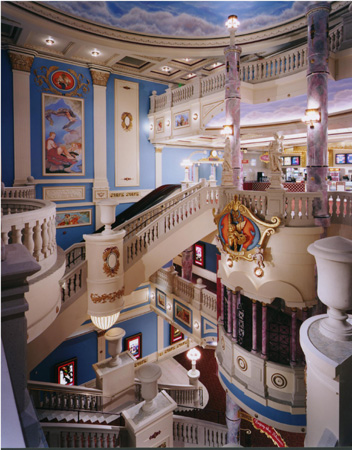
The 4 story lobby of the Muvico Parisian 20 theater in West Palm Beach, FL before its closure in 2023

In 2000, Muvico opened four more megaplexes in Florida and one in Arundel Mills in Hanover, Maryland, totaling 104 screens. The Muvico Egyptian 24 in Hanover is fitted with Egyptian murals and a 12-foot statue of Anubis. In 2001, Muvico opened the Peabody Place 22 in Memphis, Tennessee with a train station theme as part of the Peabody Place Retail & Entertainment Center. Muvico sold Pointe Orlando 21 to Regal Cinemas and opened new theaters in Coconut Pointe, FL and in Boynton Beach, FL. In 2007, the Baywalk 20 theater in St. Petersburg, FL opened an IMAX theater in time for the launch of Spider-Man 3, with an IMAX theater also added to the Parisian 20 location in West Palm Beach, FL.

Hashemi's tenure with Muvico came to a controversial end in early 2006 when he was fired by the company's board of directors after a failed attempt to buy the company. This led to a legal dispute, with Hashemi alleging breach of contract and the board accusing him of charging personal expenses to the company. Hashemi would later go on to found IPIC Theaters, a premier dining and movie theatre chain.

Muvico opened an 18-screen theater in Rosemont, IL on September 14, 2007, taking design cues from 1920s movie palaces and motifs of classic Hollywood. The theater featured Bogart's Bar and Grill and the Premier Theaters on the upper level. The Bogart's restaurant has since closed, with the space remaining open under the AMC Theatres brand starting in 2017.

Muvico sold its Maryland Egyptian 24 location and three of its Florida locations, The Palace 20 in Boca Raton, the Boynton Beach 14 in Boynton Beach, FL and the Paradise 24 in Davie to Cinemark in March 2009. Muvico also sold its Coconut Pointe 16 location in Estero to Hollywood Theaters in 2009.

In late 2010, Muvico equipped two of its South Florida locations with D-Box motion seat technologies, allowing the guest's seat to move to the action within the feature. Muvico currently then D-Box seats installed at all locations.

On November 4, 2013, Carmike Cinemas agreed to purchase Muvico Theaters for just under $31.8 million. The deal closed at the end of 2013. In December 2016, Carmike was in turn acquired by AMC Theatres for $1.1 billion making AMC the largest theatre company in the country.
