= White House Black Market =

American women's clothing retailer

White House Black Market, Inc.
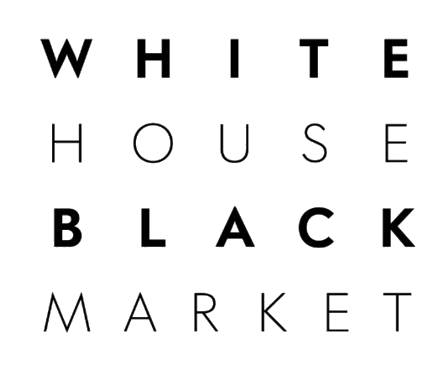
- Type: Subsidiary
- Industry: Retail
- Founded: 1985; 41 years ago
- Headquarters: Fort Myers, Florida
- Number of locations: 451 boutiques, 67 outlet stores
- Area served: United States, Puerto Rico, U.S. Virgin Islands, Canada
- Products: Apparel and accessories
- Net income: $888M (fiscal 2014)
- Parent: Chico's FAS (2003–present)
- Website: www.whitehouseblackmarket.com/store

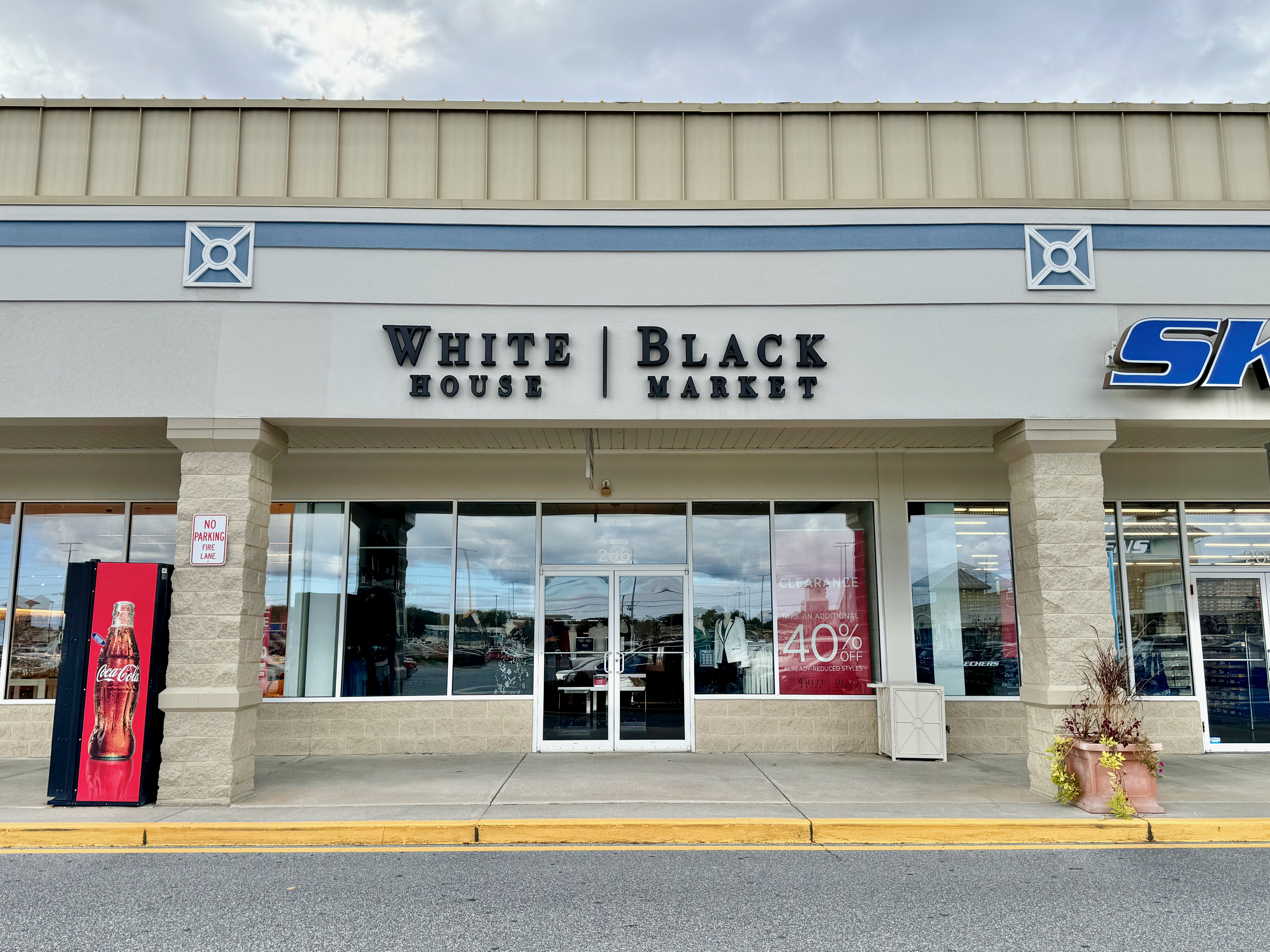
A White House Black Market store at an outdoor shopping center in Delaware

White House Black Market is an American women's clothing retailer headquartered in Fort Myers, Florida. The multichannel brand, founded in 1985, specializes in upscale clothing.

White House Black Market owns and operates various clothing and accessories boutiques in the United States, where they sell their tops, dresses, skirts, pants, jackets, outerwear, shoes, jewelry, and accessories. Since 2003, White House Black Market has operated as a subsidiary of Chico's FAS.

== History ==
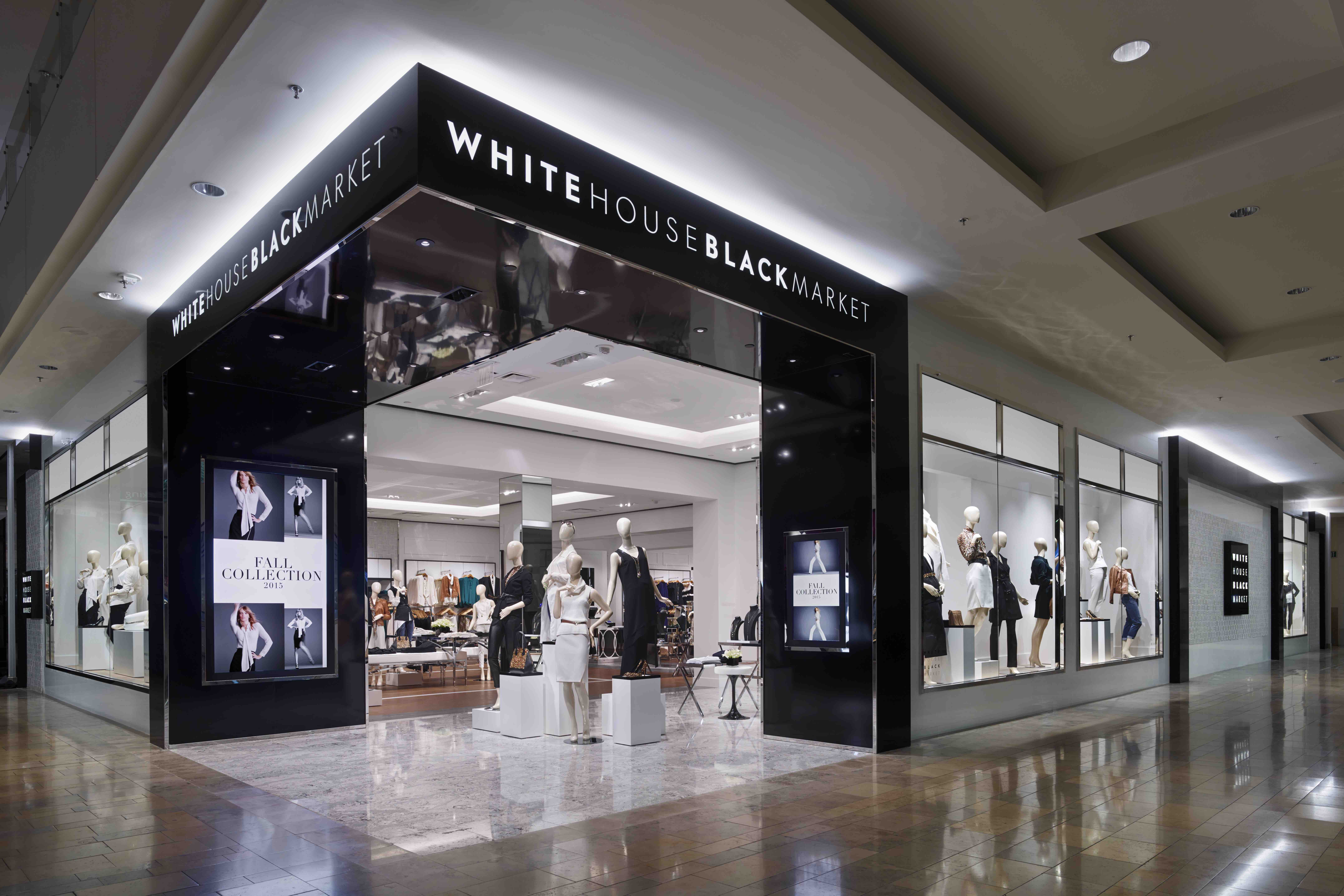
Store exterior, White House Black Market

=== 1980s and 1990s ===
The company began in 1985 when cofounders Patricia Smith and Richard Sarmiento opened the first store called The White House, in Baltimore, Maryland. The White House only carried women's clothing in shades of white. The boutique performed extremely well, catering to an upscale clientele of women.

In 1991, with the help of National Retail Group, a North Carolina–based consulting firm, The White House began its national expansion. After a decade of selling exclusively white merchandise, the brand launched a new retail format—"Black Market"—in Annapolis, MD, in 1995. A few experiments followed, where Smith and Sarmiento housed both White House and Black Market under the same roof as a store that only sold sale merchandise culled from both stores. Their endeavors were successful, and in 1997, the company began converting existing stores to this White House Black Market combination concept.

=== 2000s ===
In 2003, Chico's FAS, Inc. purchased White House Black Market after the privately held firm went public. The purchase price for the specialty retailer was $90M, with $85.6M in cash and about $4.4M in Chico's common stock.

In 2007, Donna M. Noce stepped into the role of White House Black Market brand President. Prior to taking her position at White House Black Market, Noce served as President of Ann Taylor LOFT and also spent time at Lerner New York Division of Limited, Inc. and Petrie Stores Corporation.

White House Black Market gained coverage in 2008 when Michelle Obama wore the brand's Tank Leaf Print Dress as a cohost of TV talkfest The View. Virtually overnight, the dress (priced at $148) all but sold out at White House Black Market boutiques.

== Collections ==
White House Black Market's collections include dresses, jackets, pants, shoes, swim, tees, accessories and "everyday essentials". Key collections include:

- Iconic Black & White – "Classic black and white clothing".
- Workwear – The WorkKit collection, in a "seasonless" black fabric, includes pants, jackets, shirts and accessories for work.
- Wedding & Event Boutique – Launched on January 26, 2015. The collection's key piece is White House Black Market's "Genius dress", a design that can be worn multiple ways. The Wedding & Event Boutique features party and cocktail dresses as well as bridesmaid dresses, shoes, jewelry and more.

== Advertising and promotion ==
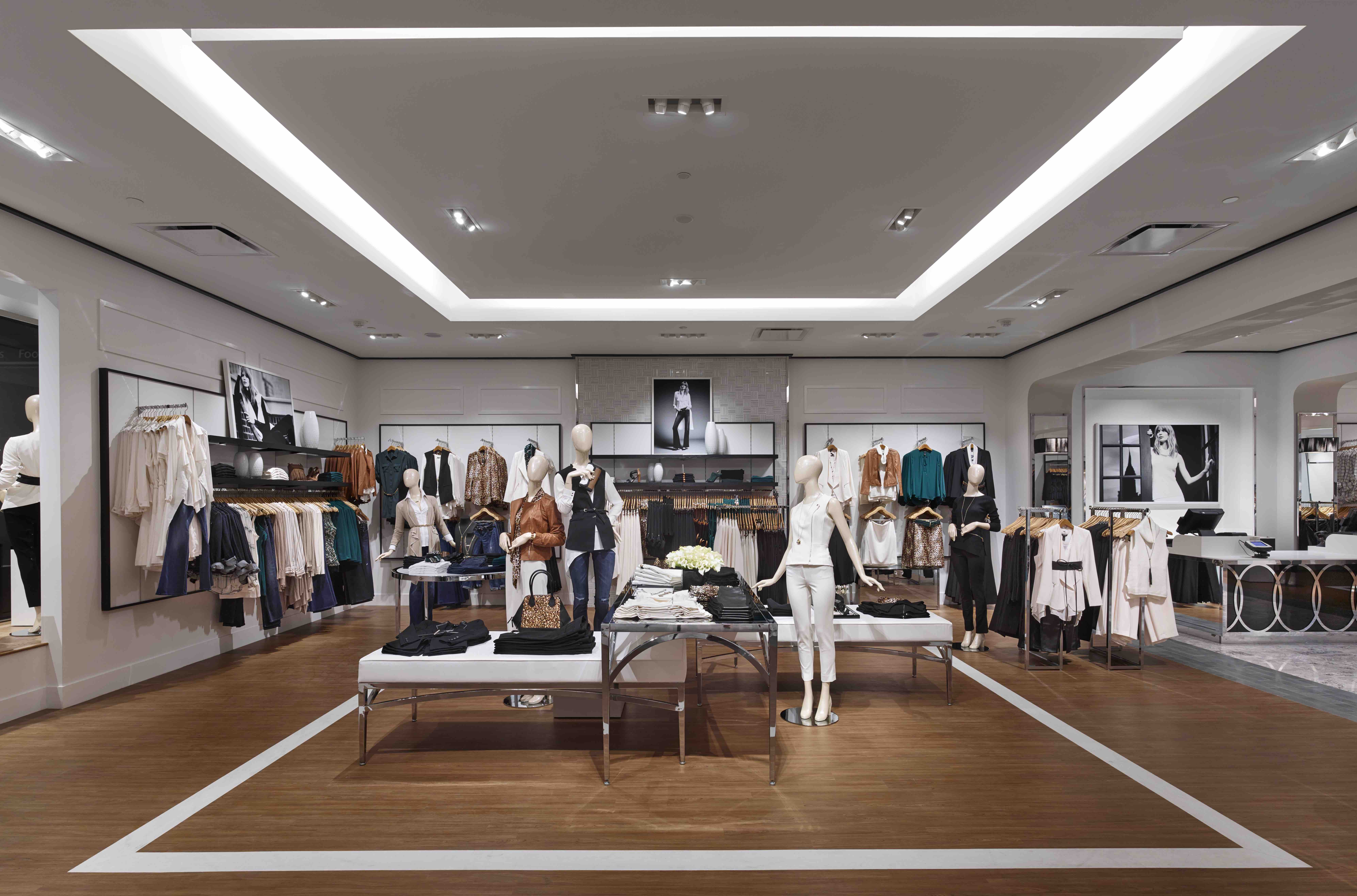
Store interior, White House Black Market

In fiscal 2014, WHBM re-launched its rewards program as WHBM Rewards. The program includes tier-based discounts, promotions, free shipping and invitations to private sales based on customer's annual spend.

White House Black Market's marketing program consists of the company's loyalty program (WHBM Rewards), direct marketing efforts (direct mail, email), national print and broadcast advertising, internet and direct phone sales, social media marketing, and public relations and community outreach programs.

White House Black Market has worked with models Alyssa Miller, Linda Voitova, Michaela Kocianova, and Naty Chabenenko (Holiday 2012), Anne Vyalitsyna, (Spring/Summer 2013), Bette Franke, and Lakshmi Menon, (Holiday 2011) and Ali Stephens (Spring/Summer 2011) among others. A 2012 television ad directed by Johan Renck featured supermodel Coco Rocha in over a dozen outfits from the company's WorkKit collection.

== Locations ==
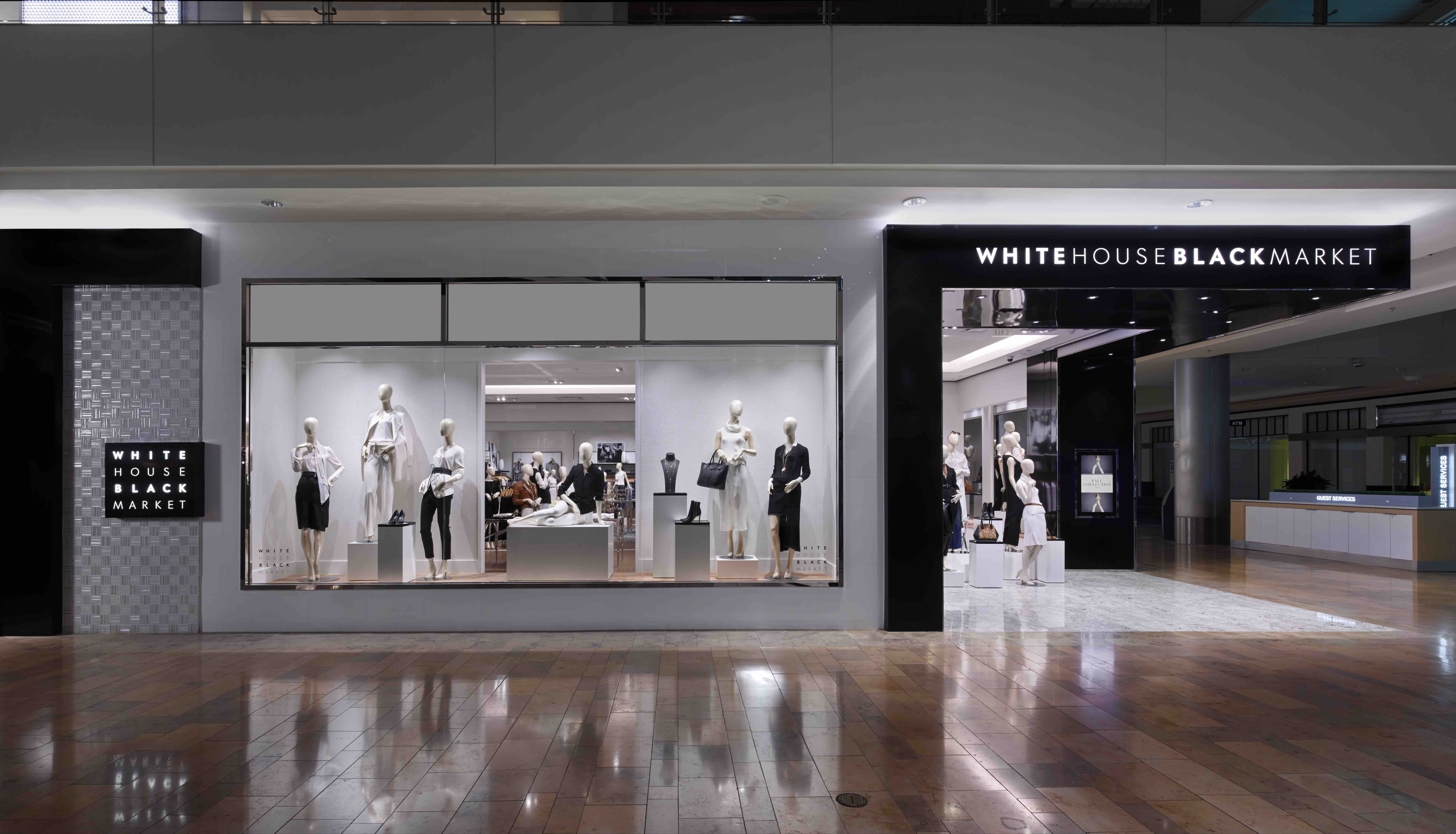
White House Black Market, Fashion Show Mall

White House Black Market currently operates more than 440 boutiques and over 60 outlets across the United States, Puerto Rico, and the U.S. Virgin Islands.

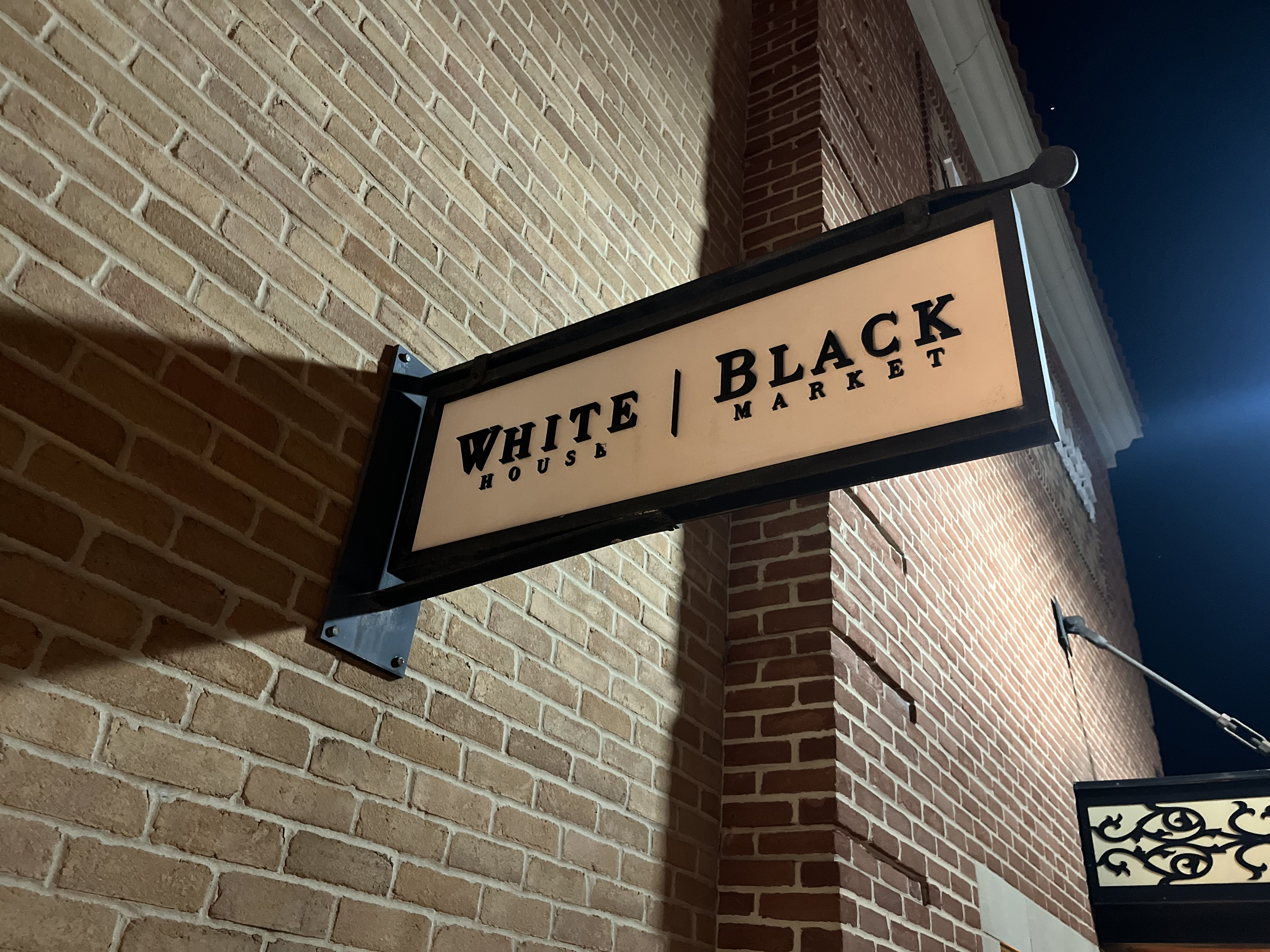
Sign outside the location in Heritage Square in Granger, IN at night

The opening of a White House Black Market store in Toronto, Canada on October 24, 2014, was the first push toward international expansion for Chico's brands. As of January 31, 2015 White House Black Market had five stores across Canada. Amid the COVID-19 pandemic White House Black Market closed all of its Canadian locations and Chicos FAS Canada filed for bankruptcy. They officially left the Canadian market in September 2020.

== See also ==
- Retail apocalypse
