= Chico's FAS =

American retail company

Chico's FAS, Inc.
- Type: Private
- Traded as: NYSE: CHS
- Industry: Retail
- Founded: 1983; 43 years ago (as Folk Art Specialties)
- Headquarters: Fort Myers, Florida, U.S.
- Number of locations: Chico's: 551 boutique, 125 outlet (2018); White House Black Market: 390 boutique, 65 outlet stores (2018); Soma: 258 boutique, 19 outlet stores (2018)
- Area served: United States; Puerto Rico; U.S. Virgin Islands; Canada
- Products: Apparel and accessories
- Revenue: $2.1 billion (2018)
- Operating income: $43.6 million (2018)
- Net income: $35.6 million (2018)
- Owner: Sycamore Partners
- Number of employees: 18,500 (2018)
- Website: www.chicosfas.com

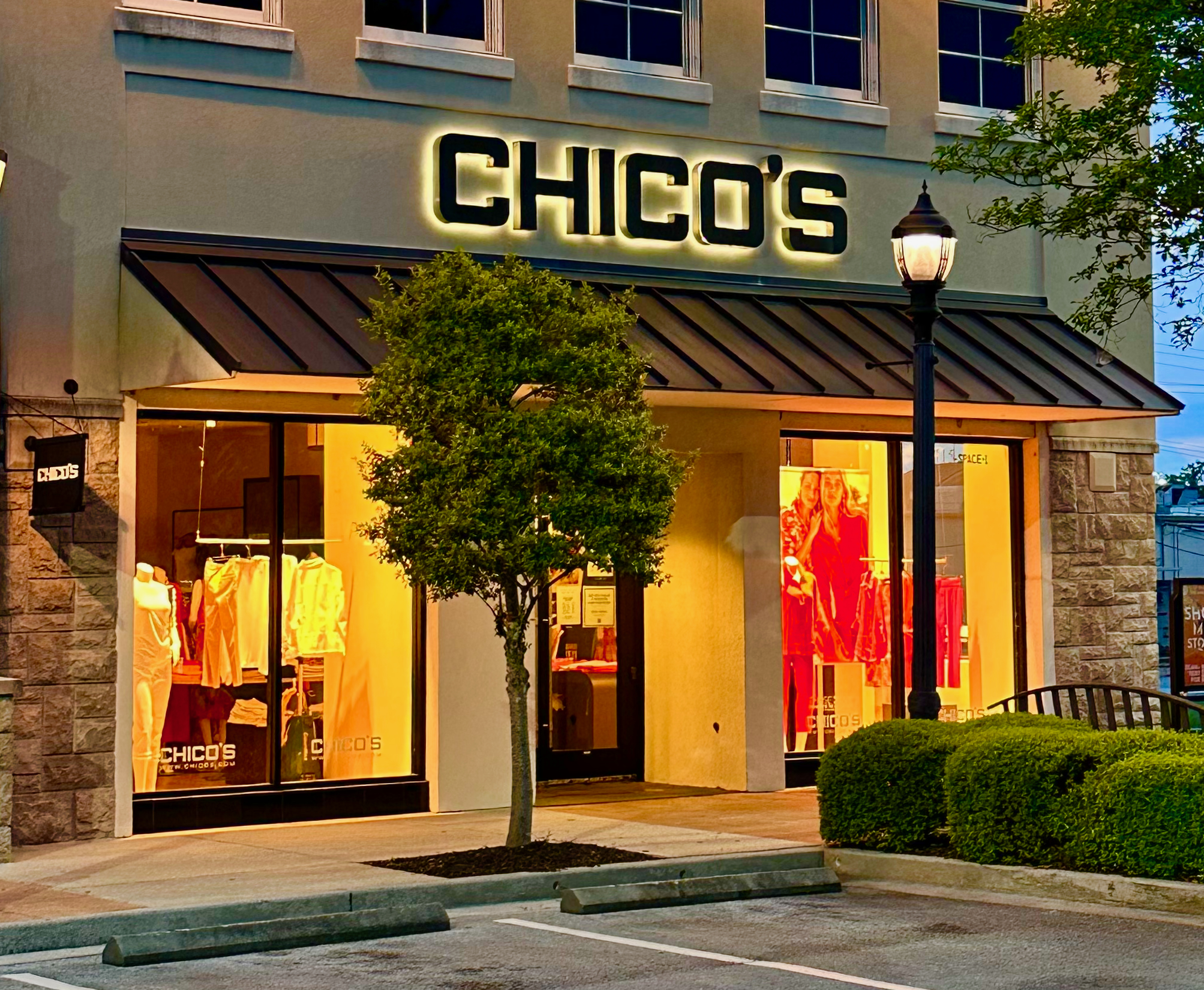
A Chico's store in Chattanooga, Tennessee

Chico's FAS, Inc. is an American women's clothing and accessories retailer founded in 1983 on Sanibel Island, Florida. Founded by Marvin and Helene Gralnick, it is headquartered in Fort Myers, Florida and operates four brands: its namesake Chico's store, White House Black Market, Soma and TellTale.

As of October 2019, Chico's FAS operated 1,376 women's clothing stores in the US and Canada, and sold merchandise online. Merchandise was also sold through franchise locations in Mexico and U.S. airport locations.

On January 5, 2024, Sycamore Partners completed the acquisition of the company for approximately 1 billion dollars.

== History ==
=== 1972–1990 ===
Founders Marvin and Helene Gralnick met in 1972 while living in Guadalajara, Mexico. In 1983, they opened a tiny Mexican folk art gift shop in Periwinkle Place on Sanibel Island, Florida. Helene named the shop Folk Art Specialties and then changed the name to Chico's Folk Art Specialties after a friend's pet parrot, Chico. The store sold mostly art, but the sweaters in the store outsold everything else, so Chico's Folk Art Specialties transformed into a clothing boutique.

In 1985, Chico's Folk Art Specialties opened a second boutique on Captiva Island, Florida. All early boutiques were infused with Mexican folk art combined with antiques and fixtures manufactured in Marvin's in-house woodshop.

In the beginning, Marvin and Helene would not close the store until they reached a certain amount of sales each day. They also could not afford to have bags printed, so the name was handwritten on each bag.

The first franchise store opened in Edina, Minnesota, in 1987. In 1989, the company shortened its name to Chico's FAS (an abbreviation for Folk Art Specialties) and launched the Passport Loyalty Rewards program.

=== 1991–2000 ===
By 1992, the company operated 60 boutiques and began designing its own prints and patterns.

Chico's FAS went public in 1993 and began trading on NASDAQ under the title CHS. It premiered its Most Amazing Personal Service (MAPS) customer service initiative in 1998, which still remains as part of the company's focus as of 2018. Between 1998 and 2000, Chico's sales increased an average of 50 percent per year. In 2010, Chico's FAS began online sales at Chicos.com. It also began advertising in national magazines, including Martha Stewart Living and Marie Claire.

=== 2001–2010 ===
In 2001, the Chico's FAS Founders building opened in Fort Myers, Florida, and Chico's FAS debuted on the New York Stock Exchange.

Chico's FAS aired its first commercial in six major markets on The Today Show, Good Morning America, The Oprah Winfrey Show, and Martha Stewart Living.

Average new store sales reached $1.45 million per year in 2003. The next year, Chico's FAS acquired White House Black Market, a women's clothing company that focuses on white, black, and other variants of the two colors. Chico's FAS also launched Soma, an intimate apparel boutique.

In 2006, Chico's FAS added 24 acres to the Fort Myers campus to support growth, and stock reached a high of $49.40.

=== 2011–present ===
In 2011, Chico's FAS acquired Boston Proper, which is a brand available online or by catalog. Two years later, Boston Proper opened its first boutique at Coconut Point in Estero, Florida.

In 2013, Chico's FAS expanded internationally by opening White House Black Market stores in Canada. On May 13, 2014, Chico's FAS announced expansion of the Chico's brand into Canada. Three boutiques have since opened in Canada. Further international expansion has occurred with its namesake Chico's into Mexico in 2014. Through an exclusive franchise with El Puerto de Liverpool ("Liverpool"), Chico's opened a stand-alone boutique at Perisur Mall, Mexico City. Plans for further Chico's expansion into Mexico include more openings of stand-alone boutiques as well as branded shop-in-shops in Liverpool department stores.

In 2016, Chico's FAS sold Boston Proper to Brentwood Associates, an investment firm in Los Angeles.

In 2017, the company launched its first online outlet store, Chico's Off The Rack. Also in 2017, the company Chico's began selling on cruise ships through Princess Cruises and Starboard Cruise Services. In 2019, Chico's announced it was opening airport stores in partnership with airport retailer operator Stellar Partnerships. The company also started selling online through Amazon and ShopRunner.

== Chico's FAS brands ==
=== Chico's ===
The Chico's brand was founded in 1983 and originally started as a small boutique selling Mexican folk art and apparel on Sanibel Island, Florida. Today, Chico's primarily sells private branded clothing for women. The brand has its own unique sizing that runs from 000 to 4.

=== White House Black Market ===
The White House Black Market brand began in 1985 in Baltimore, Maryland, and was acquired by Chico's FAS in 2003. It primarily offers exclusively designed, private label women's clothing and accessory items with a "boutique feel". Accessory items range from shoes to scarves to jewelry and belts. The focus of each seasonal assortment ranges from everyday basics, to wear-to-work, to fashion in monochromatic black, white, and related shades with "seasonal color splashes".

=== Soma ===
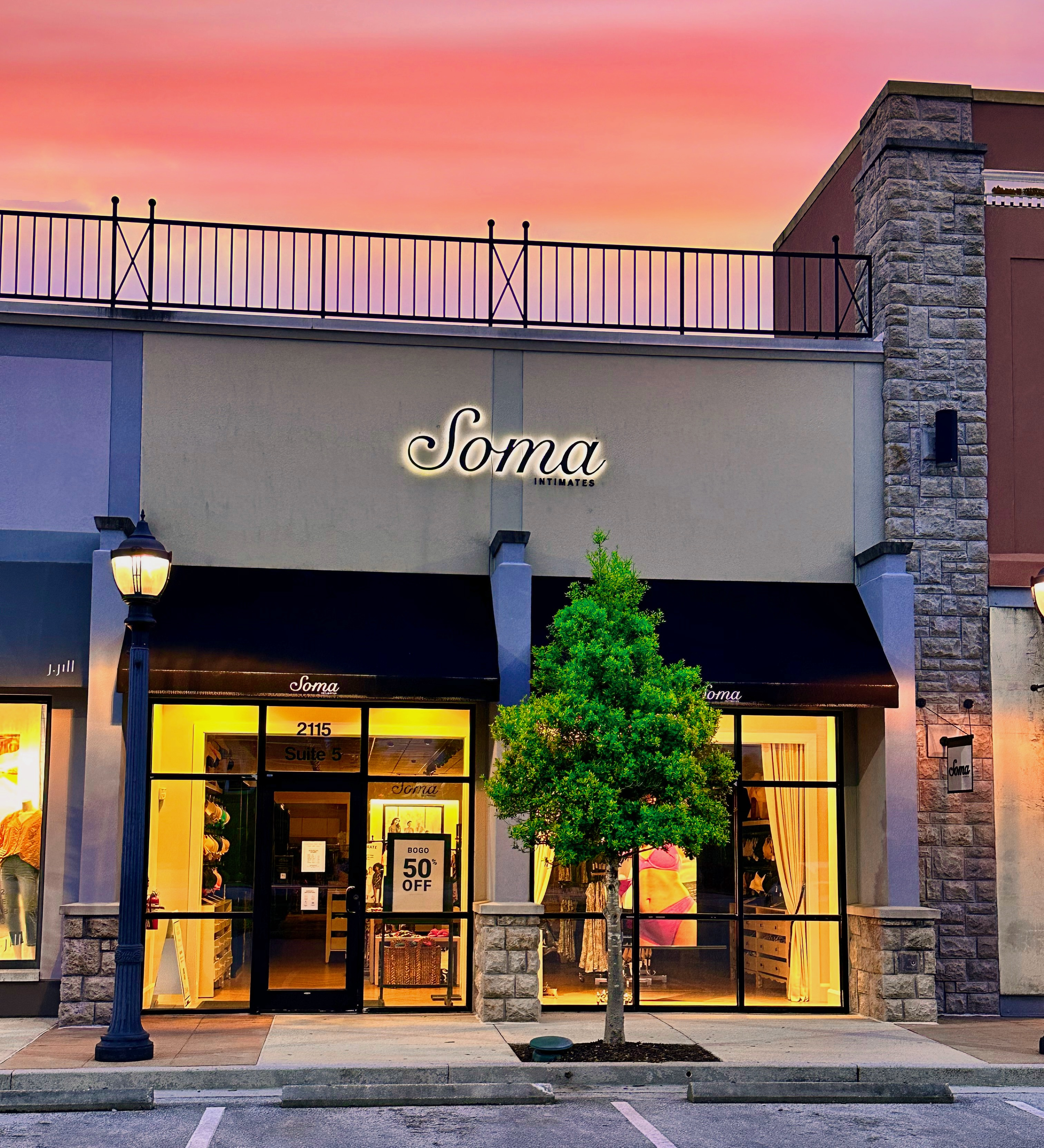
A Soma store

Soma was launched by Chico's FAS in 2004. The brand primarily sells bras and sleepwear. The brand also offers dresses, loungewear, swimwear, shapewear, and lingerie. The associates measure women for the correct bra fit and then suggests the most appropriate sizes and styles. This service is performed accurately by their own fleet of expert bra fitters. The brand was started by women and according to their own corporate landing page is still led by a customer facing fleet consisting of female leadership and staff.

=== TellTale ===
TellTale is an online underwear brand launched in 2019. It was phased out in 2023.

== Management ==
=== Leadership ===
The current leadership is:

- President and chief executive officer, Director: Bonnie R. Brooks
- President, Apparel Group: Molly Langenstein
- President, Intimates Group: Mary van Praag
- Vice President / CMO, Intimates Group: Cristina Ceresoli
