= Crowhurst =

Crowhurst may refer to:

== Places ==
- Crowhurst, East Sussex, England
  - Crowhurst railway station
- Crowhurst, Surrey, England
  - Crowhurst Place
  - Crowhurst Yew

== People ==
- Cyril Crowhurst (1906–1995), British sound engineer
- Donald Crowhurst (1932–1969), English businessman and amateur sailor
- Geoff Crowhurst (1951–2009), South Australian actor and director
- Harry Arthur Crowhurst (1868–1943), British optician and optical engineer
- Katie Crowhurst (born 2004), British para-athlete
- Megan Crowhurst (born 1961), linguist
- Thomas Crowhurst (1811–1877), English cricketer
- William Crowhurst (1849–1915), English cricketer

== Other ==
- Crowhurst (band), rock music group
- Crowhurst (film), a 2017 film about Donald Crowhurst
