= Charles Crawley =

English cricketer

Charles Crawley (1 May 1908 – 24 July 1935) was an English cricketer. He played one first-class match for Essex in 1929. Crawley was born in Brandon and died in Sunderland.

Crawley scored a duck in his first innings, and three runs in the second, partnering brother Leonard in the opening order. Crawley died at the age of 27.

Aside from Leonard, Crawley's cricket-playing relatives included his cousins Cosmo and Aidan, and his uncles Arthur, Eustace and Henry. Of these, Aidan had the longest and most successful first-class career, lasting twenty years in total - while also holding down jobs as a politician and editor.
