= Spencer Crawley =

English cricketer

- Born: Spencer Henry Crawley; 5 August 1987 (age 39); Westminster, London, England
- Education: Harrow School; Exeter College, Oxford
- Known for: firstminute capital
- Cricket career

Personal information
- Height: 6 ft 0 in (1.83 m)
- Batting: Right-handed
- Bowling: Right-arm off break
- Relatives: Douglas Nation (grandfather); Aidan Crawley (grandfather); Arthur Crawley (great-grandfather); Henry Crawley (great-uncle); Eustace Crawley (great-uncle); Cosmo Crawley (great-uncle)

Domestic team information
- Years: Team
- 2008: Oxford University

Career statistics
| Competition | First-class |
|---|---|
| Matches | 1 |
| Runs scored | 24 |
| Batting average | 24.00 |
| 100s/50s | –/– |
| Top score | 20* |
| Catches/stumpings | –/– |
- Source: Cricinfo, 18 February 2020

Spencer Henry Crawley (born 5 August 1987) is an English businessman and former cricketer. He is the co-founder and General Partner at firstminute capital, a $500m venture capital firm based in London, investing across Europe.

== Biography ==
Born into a large cricketing family, Crawley was born at Westminster on 5 August 1987. He was educated at Harrow School, before going up Exeter College, Oxford. While studying at Oxford, Crawley a single first-class appearance in The University Match for Oxford University against Cambridge University in 2008 at Oxford. Batting twice in the match, he was dismissed for 4 runs in the Oxford first-innings by Tom Hemingway, while in their second-innings he was unbeaten on 20.

Spencer started his career at Goldman Sachs in Moscow in the Fixed Income, Currencies and Commodities division, before becoming the first hire at DMC Partners, a Special Opportunities fund spun out of Goldman Sachs.

In 2020, Crawley and his co-founder Brent Hoberman launched firstminute capital's second fund, taking firstminute's investor base to over 100 unicorn founders.
