= Edward Cowles =

Edward Cowles may refer to:

- Edward Cowles (psychiatrist) (1836/37–1919), American psychiatrist
- Edward Spencer Cowles (1879–1954), American physician
- Edward Pitkin Cowles (1815–1874), justice of the Supreme Court of New York
