= Barry J. Beitzel =

American Old Testament scholar, geographer (born 1942)

Barry J. Beitzel (born August 6, 1942, in Mechanicsburg, Pennsylvania, age 84) is an Old Testament scholar, geographer, cartographer, and translator of the Bible. In 2025 he resides in Woodstock, Georgia. He is the son of Harry Frederick Beitzel and Della Elizabeth Beitzel, both originally from the Mechanicsburg area.

== Education and scholarship ==
Following a BA in Bible and an MA in Old Testament from Bob Jones University, Beitzel studied Semitic Languages at the Fuller Theological Seminary and General Linguistics at the University of Pennsylvania. He then enrolled at The Dropsie University (Philadelphia; merged with the University of Pennsylvania in 1993; renamed the Herbert D. Katz Center for Advanced Judaic Studies in 2008), where he earned a PhD degree in ancient Near Eastern Languages and Literatures in 1976; his dissertation is titled The Place-Names in the Mari Texts: An Onomastic and Toponymic Study, and was completed under the tutelege of Nahum M. Waldman and Theodor H. Gaster. He studied cuneiform under David I. Owen while at Dropsie. He obtained a post-doctorate in ancient Near Eastern Geography at L'Université de Liège (Belgium, 1981), where he worked with the doyen of Near Eastern geography, J.-R. Kupper, and Assyriologist Georges Dossin.

Beitzel's academic areas of interest include the geographic and spatial dimension of the biblical storylines within the context of their physical world. His primary archaeological work relates to the geographic context and socio-spatiality of the network of paved communication and transportation arteries and unpaved thoroughfares across the ancient Near East, more recently focusing on the structure and location of ancient roadways and milestones in the southern Levant east of the Jordan River (corresponding mostly with the modern country of Jordan); he also spent one season in eastern Syria, with the UCLA team excavating the site of Tell Ashara, where he was also a member of Giorgio Buccellati's geographical team surveying the terrain and searching for undiscovered ancient sites in the Middle Euphrates and Lower Habur River valleys.

Beitzel's professional work has taken him to Western Asia and the greater Mediterranean on more than 50 occasions. He has also lectured in various countries, and contributed to serial publications, chapters to various monographs, and essays in festschriften. Beitzel served as senior translator for the New Living Bible. He is a former board member of the American Oriental Society, Middle West region. He is a member of The American Schools of Oriental Research, The Association of American Geographers, The National Association of Professors of Hebrew and The Society of Biblical Literature.

Some of his maps are now on permanent display in the Library of Congress.

== Academic career ==
Barry J. Beitzel has been a member of the Department of Old Testament and Semitic Languages at Trinity Evangelical Divinity School (TEDS; Deerfield, Illinois) since 1976, as assistant professor (1976–1980), associate professor (1980–1985; tenured 1983), professor (1985–2016), and professor emeritus (2016 to the present). He was associate academic dean between the years 1986–1996 and executive vice president/provost throughout 1996–2004.

== Family ==
Dr. Beitzel is married to Carol (née Watson); they have three married children.

== Awards ==
- ECPA 2010 Christian Books Award, Medallion of Excellence, ( Bible Study and Reference category)
- Winner of the American Congress on Surveying and Mapping map design competition

== Selected publications ==
- Barry J. Beitzel, The Moody Atlas of Bible Lands. Chicago: Moody Press, 1985. ISBN 9780802404381. Winner, 1986 American Congress on Surveying and Mapping Map Design Competition, sponsored by the Association of American Geographers; Finalist, 1986 Evangelical Christian Publishers Gold Medallion Book Award for the "Bible and Reference Study" category.
- Barry J. Beitzel, chief consultant and cartographer. Biblica, the Bible Atlas: A Social and Historical Journey Through the Lands of the Bible. Camberwell, Australia & London: Viking & Penguin Books Ltd., 2004. ISBN 9780670029860.
- Barry J. Beitzel, The New Moody Atlas of the Bible. Chicago: Moody; Oxford: Lion Hudson, 2009. ISBN 9780802404411. Revised edition, 2025. Updated and Revised, Moody Bible Atlas. Chicago: Moody Press, 2025. ISBN 9780802429964. Winner, 2010 Evangelical Christian Publishers Gold Medallion Book Award for the "Bible Reference and Study" category. "2010 Best in Category" in the Book/Atlas category at the 37th Annual Map Design Competition sponsored by the Cartographic and Geographic Information Systems [CaGIS] of the Association of American Geographers.
- Barry J. Beitzel, chief consultant and cartographer, History, Geography, and Worship: the Bible. New York: Sweet Water Press, 2014. ISBN 9781492477433.
- Barry J. Beitzel, general editor and author, Lexham Geographic Commentary on the Gospels. Bellingham, WA: Logos Bible Software and Lexham Press, 2016, 2018 ISBN 9781683590446. Winner, Christianity Today "2019 Book Award in Biblical Studies."
- Barry J. Beitzel, general editor and author, Lexham Geographic Commentary on Acts through Revelation (LGC) (2019) ISBN 9781683593423 2019 Biblical Foundations Book Award Finalist in Biblical Theology.
- Barry J. Beitzel, general editor and author, Lexham Geographic Commentary on the Pentateuch. Bellingham, WA: Logos Bible Software and Lexham Press, 2023. ISBN 9781683587285 (Digital); 9781683597292 (Print). 2024 TGC Book Award of Distinction in Biblical Studies.
- Barry J. Beitzel, Where Was the Biblical Red Sea? Examining the Ancient Evidence. Studies in Biblical Archaeology, Geography & History 1. Bellingham, WA: Lexham Press, 2020.ISBN 9781683594383. 2020 Center for Biblical Studies Book Award Finalist for Old Testament Studies.
- Barry J. Beitzel, general editor and author, Lexham Geographic Commentary on the Historical Books, volume 1: Joshua to Ruth. Bellingham, WA: Logos Bible Software and Lexham Press, 2025. ISBN 9781683597919 (Digital); ISBN 9781683597919 (Print).
- Barry J. Beitzel, general editor, Lexham Geographic Commentary on the Historical Books, volume 2: 1 Kings to 2 Chronicles. Bellingham, WA: Logos Bible Software and Lexham Press, 2026. ISBN 9781683598114 (Digital); ISBN 9781683598107 (Print).

=== Maps ===
He has contributed to the production to a collection of maps by his supervision:

- Ancient Israel: A Short History (Biblical Archaeology Society, 1988). ISBN 9780961308940
- Zondervan Publishing House (including the NIV Study Bible; the Zondervan New American Standard Bible; the New Zondervan Study Bible). Zondervan: Grand Rapids, 1987, 1989, 1990, 2009, 2011, 2015.
- The New Living Bible (including the NLT Study Bible, the Life Application Study Bible). Wheaton: Tyndale House, 1996, 2003, 2004, 2007, 2008, 2011, 2015, 2016.
- Logos Biblical Places Maps (Logos/FaithLife, 2005).
- Holman Bible Atlas (Holman, 1998). ISBN 1558197095
- B. B. Kirkbride Bible (Thompson Chain Reference Bible). Indianapolis: B B Kirkbride Company, 1988, 1991.
- The Nelson Study Bible (Thomas Nelson, 2018).
- Crossway ESV Bible Atlas (Crossway, 2010). ISBN 9781433501920
- J. N Darby Translation (London: Bible Truth Publishers, 2016).
- Thomas Nelson Publishers (Nashville: Thomas Nelson, 2016).
- Schuyler Publishers (Roanoke: Virginia, 2012).

His maps have appeared in:

- Atlas of the Ancient World (National Geographic, 2016, 2019)
- National Geographic maps:
  - 189.4 (April, 1996, [insets])
  - 214.6 (December, 2008, p.43)
  - 218.6 (December, 2010, p.74 [foldout])
  - 221.3 (March, 2012, p.51)
  - 232.6 (December, 2017, pp.48–50, 57 [foldouts]).
