= Lyrics Alley =

2010 novel by Leila Aboulela

- First edition (UK)
- Author: Leila Aboulela
- Language: English
- Publisher: Weidenfeld & Nicolson (UK), Grove Press (US)
- Publication date: 1 December 2010
- Pages: 320
- ISBN: 0297863142
- Preceded by: Minaret
- Followed by: The Kindness of Enemies

Lyrics Alley is a 2010 novel by Sudanese author Leila Aboulela. The book is a fictionalised account of the life of Sudanese poet Hassan Awad Aboulela.

== History ==
Aboulela decided to write a novel based on the life of her uncle, a poet in the 1940s who was bedridden for 20 years. She moved the events of his life into the 1950s so they would coincide with Sudanese independence. Aboulela states that by writing a book set in Sudan, she wanted to dispel "stereotypical images of famine and war" so often associated with the country.

== Plot ==
In 1950s Sudan, beautiful student Soraya can barely wait to marry her handsome and intelligent cousin Nur. Nur has dreams of being a poet, but his father, wealthy businessman Mahmoud Abuzeid, is completely opposed to this. He wants Nur to go to an English university in the United Kingdom and take over the family business, as Mahmoud's oldest son Nasir is lazy and a spendthrift. Meanwhile, Nur's impoverished former tutor Ustaz Badr secretly encourages him to write poetry.

Nur's brilliant future is ruined when he dives from the beach at Alexandria and becomes a quadriplegic. Despite several surgeries, neurologists are unable to cure him. The Abuzeud family is divided in the aftermath. Mahmoud's estranged wife Waheeba waits on Nur hand and foot and uses the opportunity to wreak revenge on Nabilah, Mahmoud's favorite wife. Soraya at first believes that Nur will be cured, but is forbidden from marrying him by Mahmoud. Soraya eventually marries one of Nur's good friends, and Nur becomes a famous poet, when popular singers put his words to music.

== Characters ==
- Mahmoud Bey Abuzeid – The head of the Abuzeid clan and the family's business Abuzeid Trading. Mahmoud seeks to increase his assets by gaining favour with the British.
- Nur Abuzeid – Mahmoud's second son who attends the prestigious British-style Victoria College, Alexandria. He is a good scholar and athlete and will inherit his father's company one day.
- Soraya Abuzeid – Nur's cousin who is also betrothed to him. The couple is very much in love.
- Nabilah Abuzeid – Mahmoud's second wife, an Egyptian who is young, pretty and modern.
- Ustaz Badr – Nur's former tutor who encourages him to write poetry.
- Hajjah Waheeba Abuzeid – Mahmoud's first wife who is very traditional. Waheeba and Mahmoud had an arranged marriage and have been separated for years, although they still live in the same house.
- Nasir Abuzeid – Mahmoud's unreliable oldest son who spends most of his time in bars and brothels.
- Idris Abuzeid – Soraya's strict father. Idris is Mahmoud's younger brother.
- Fatma Abuzeid – Soraya's older sister and the long-suffering wife of Nasir.

== Awards ==
- 2012 Saltire Society Literary Awards, Scottish Book Award for Fiction
