= Douglas Nation =

English/Northern India cricketer (1916–1997)

Douglas Codrington Nation (31 March 1916 – 29 December 1997) was an English cricketer with but one first-class appearance to his name. This was the Ranji Trophy semi-final in 1941/42: for Northern India against Bombay, Nation batted at number eleven and did not bowl in either innings, in spite of the fact that seven of his teammates did. With Aidan and Spencer Crawley, he is part of the only set of two grandfathers and a grandson to play the first-class game.
