= Translator (disambiguation) =

A translator is a linguist who translates documents from one language to another.

Translator(s) or The Translator(s) may also refer to:

== Arts and media ==
=== Literature ===
- The Translator (Aboulela novel), a 1999 novel by Sudanese writer Leila Aboulela
- The Translator (Crawley novel), a 2023 novel by British writer Harriet Crawley
- "Translators", a poem by Patti Smith from her 1973 book Witt

=== Films ===
- The Translator, a 2020 feature film starring Ziad Bakri
- A Translator, a 2018 Cuban docudrama film
- The Translators, 2019 French mystery thriller film

=== Music ===
- Translator (band), a San Francisco new wave band active during the 1980s
  - Translator (album), a 1985 album of the band Translator

=== Other uses in arts and media ===
- Universal translator, science fiction device which translates between any languages

== Computing and technology ==
- Translator (computing), a computer program that translates programming language instructions
- Translator, name for the software used in computer-assisted translation
- Translator, an alternative term for a broadcast relay station, a television or radio transmitter which retransmits the signal of another television or radio station
