= Cosmo Crawley =

English cricketer, rackets player, and real tennis player

Personal information
- Full name: Cosmo Stafford Crawley
- Born: 27 May 1904; Chelsea, London, England
- Died: 10 February 1989 (aged 84); Westminster, London, England
- Batting: Right-handed
- Bowling: Right-arm medium
- Relatives: Aidan Crawley (brother); Charles Crawley (cousin)

Domestic team information
- Years: Team
- 1923: Hampshire
- 1924–1925: Oxford University
- 1929: Middlesex

Career statistics
| Competition | First-class |
|---|---|
| Matches | 6 |
| Runs scored | 243 |
| Batting average | 22.09 |
| 100s/50s | –/2 |
| Top score | 81 |
| Catches/stumpings | 1/– |
- Source: Cricinfo, 8 December 2009

Cosmo Stafford Crawley (27 May 1904 – 10 February 1989) was an English first-class cricketer, rackets and real tennis player.

== Early life and cricket ==
Crawley was the eldest son of Arthur Stafford Crawley, then a curate at St Luke's, Chelsea. He was educated at Harrow School, where he played for the school cricket team against Eton and Winchester, with him heading the averages in 1922. From there, he matriculated to Magdalen College, Oxford. He played one first-class cricket match for Hampshire against Oxford University at Oxford in 1923. The following season, he played once for Oxford University against Middlesex, in addition to playing for the Free Foresters against Oxford University. In 1925, he made a further two appearance for Oxford University against Leicestershire. He would later make two further first-class appearances, playing for the Harlequins in 1927, and for Middlesex in 1929, with Oxford University the opponents in both matches; all six of his first-class appearances thus came either for or against Oxford University. In his six matches at first-class level, Crawley scored 243 runs at an average of 22.09, with one half century.

== Rackets and real tennis ==
Crawley played rackets while at Harrow School, and both rackets and real tennis while studying at Oxford. He won the British amateur rackets doubles championship in 1936 and 1937 with J. C. F. Simpson, and in 1939 and 1946 with John Pawle. He and Pawle also won the 1939 amateur real tennis doubles, beating the 3rd and 4th Lord Aberdares, then aged 54 and 20, in the final. He also captained the English rackets team against the United States in 1947, in addition to winning the Canadian Championship doubles with Pawle. Writing in The Times after Crawley's death, Alec Douglas-Home noted that "In the doubles he was master of all the arts of this fastest of ball-games".

== Later life and death ==
Crawley joined the insurance broking firm of C.T. Bowring & Co. in 1925 and was a director 1934–67 and a consultant to the firm 1967–73. He was an underwriting member of Lloyd's. At the outbreak of the Second World War, he was given an emergency commission as a second lieutenant in the Coldstream Guards, serving until 1945. Crawley died at Westminster in February 1989. His brother, Aidan, was a first-class cricketer and politician. His cousin, Charles Crawley, was also a first-class cricketer.
