= Crowhurst, Surrey =

Village in Surrey, England

Coordinates: 51.209°N 0.010°W

Crowhurst
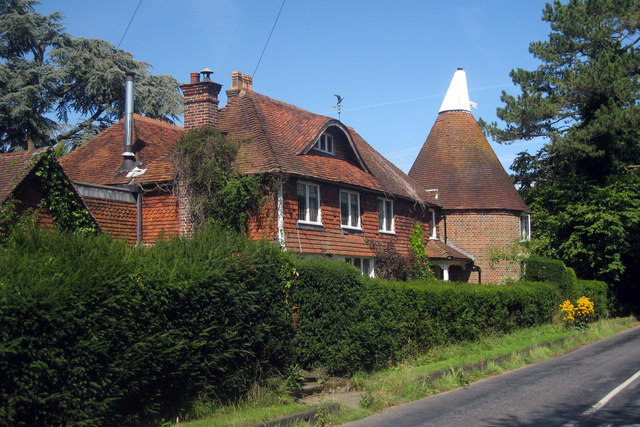
- The oast house in Crowhurst and neighbouring homes

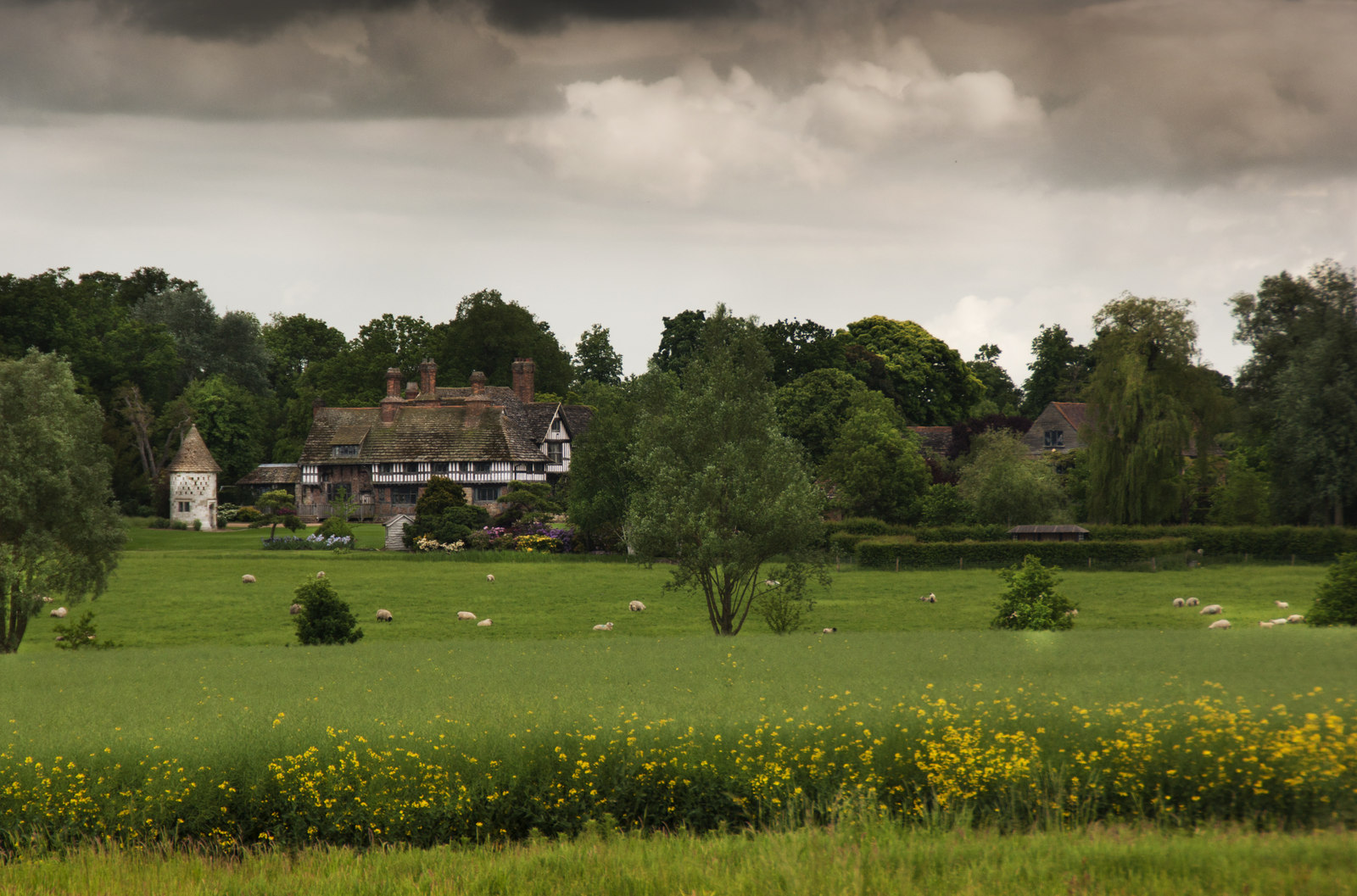
- Crowhurst Place and sheep meadows

- Location within Surrey
- Area: 9.7 km^{2} (3.7 sq mi)
- Population: 281 (Civil Parish)
  - Density: 29/km^{2} (75/sq mi)
- OS grid reference: TQ391470
  - London: 21.9 miles (35.2 km)
- Civil parish: Crowhurst
- District: Tandridge
- Shire county: Surrey
- Region: South East
- Country: England
- Sovereign state: United Kingdom
- Post town: LINGFIELD
- Postcode district: RH7
- Dialling code: 01342
- Police: Surrey
- Fire: Surrey
- Ambulance: South East Coast
- UK Parliament: East Surrey

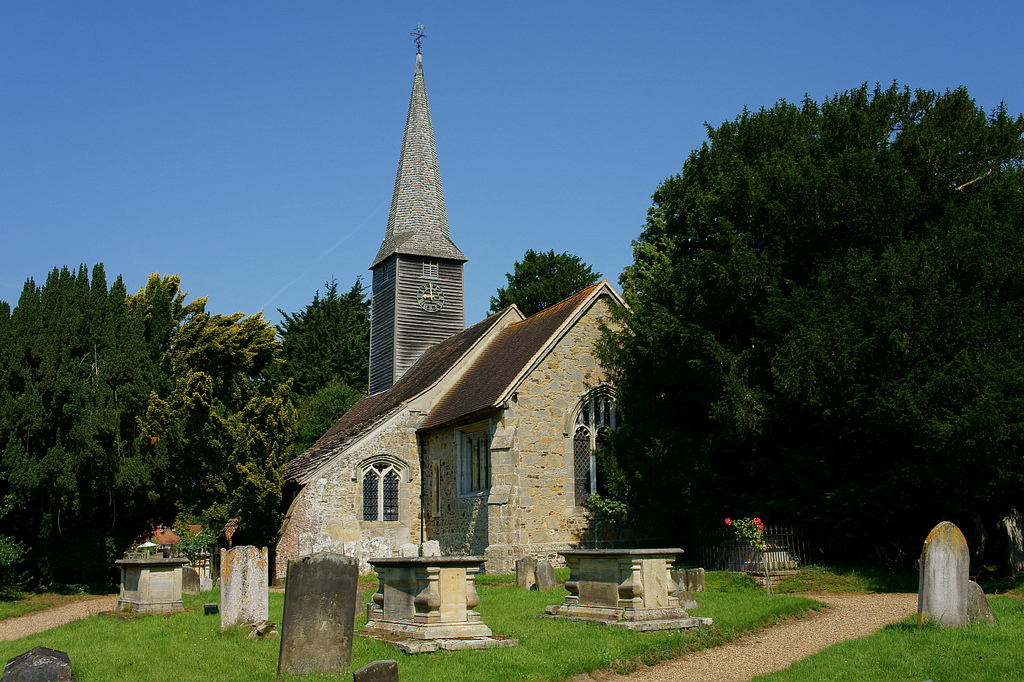
St.George's Church, Crowhurst. To the right of the church is the Crowhurst Yew

Crowhurst is a village and civil parish in the Tandridge district of Surrey, England. The nearest town is Oxted, 3 miles (5 km) to the north. Rated two architectural categories higher than the medieval church is the Renaissance manor, Crowhurst Place, which is a Grade I listed building.

== Landmarks ==
=== St George's Church ===
The parish church is dedicated to St George, and is Grade II listed. The oldest parts (the nave, south aisle and porch) date from the 12th century and the chancel was built in the 15th century. The spire was rebuilt after a fire in 1947. Inside, there are wall monuments to Justinian Angell (d. 1680) and Margaret Gainsford (d. 1691), and a wall tomb of Richard Marryott (d. 1675). A larger tomb chest is of John Gaynesford (d. 1450).

=== Crowhurst Place ===
Crowhurst Place is a timber-frame Grade I listed house, partly built 1425–1450, sited at the summit of a gradual slope about 1 mile (1.6 km) south of Crowhurst church. It faces the east and is surrounded by a moat (GPS: 51.199603, -0.017060).

The property was conveyed for the Gainsford family of the manor who held it from 1418, having acquired it from John atte Hall and Joan (in the customs of the time, presumably his wife).

John Gainsford, who died in 1450, had a younger son William, Knight of the Shire (equivalent to Member of Parliament) for Surrey in the year of his father's death, from whom descended a Gainsford line from Cowden. The Rev. George Gainsford, of this line, retiring as vicar of Hitchin, bought Crowhurst Place about 1905. He died in 1910, and his son the Rev. G. B. Gainsford became the owner.

George A. Crawley, an amateur architect who also designed Westbury House on Long Island in the United States, made alterations during his own residence in the early 20th century, then expanded the building again between 1912 and 1915 for his successor as lessee, Consuelo Vanderbilt.

== History ==
The place-name 'Crowhurst', first recorded in 1189 in various forms similar to those of the next century Croherst and Crauhurste, simply means 'crow wood'.

The settlement was in the Anglo-Saxon administrative division of Tandridge hundred hundred. The Domesday Book (1086) has no record of the place. To quote Malden's Victoria County History of 1911:

[Crowhust] is one of the places on [the Weald Clay] which do not appear as parishes until the 13th century, and were probably scarcely inhabited at the time of the Domesday Survey. It was then no doubt part of Oxted, to which the manor was subordinate. The dedication of the church to St. George indicates a consecration not earlier than the third Crusade...

=== Manor ===
In 1338 Robert de Stangrave and Joan his wife conveyed the manor to John Gainsford and Margaret his wife. The Gainsford family held Crowhurst until 1716, when a dispute arose between rival claimants to the estate. The manor was sold in 1720 to Edward Gibbon, a director of the South Sea Company, but before the transaction could be completed, he was declared bankrupt and in 1723 the estate was placed in the care of a board of trustees. The following year, Crowhurst was sold to the Duchess of Marlborough, who used the endowed income of the manor to found the Marlborough almshouses for the poor in need of their own dwellings in St Albans.

=== Other manors ===
Three other manors existed: Atgrove, Chellows and Rugge. Each was originally owned by the Gainsford family. A brief-lived fourth manor may have existed, Infields, crossing boundaries by extending into Lingfield and Tandridge, but of its three parts from the 14th century (Mote, Newlands and Maynmead), only Newlands in Tandridge had the wealth and status of a manor. Owen Manning (a noted county historian, who lived 1721–1801) suggests that the name Atgrove survives in Blackgrove Farm, the property of the Gainsford family at the time of his book on Surrey, published posthumously in 1804.

In an iron-producing area, the church's monuments include one cast-iron grave slab. In the churchyard is a hollow short yew tree, the Crowhurst Yew, measuring about 33 feet (10 m) in diameter. Early in the 19th century a bench was fixed inside the tree, and a wooden door added, with seating for about twelve people. An iron cannonball found in the middle of the tree is still preserved there.

== Geography and transport ==
Gibbs Brook forms part of the boundary with Oxted and was called the Gippes River, and flows into the River Eden, Kent which discharges into the River Medway near Edenbridge.

Most development is in two linear settlements: small detached houses at Ardenrun Shaw, a small wood to the north – only one of these is listed; St Georges Cottages and its continuation which is narrowly west of the border (in Godstone) Crowhurst Lane End which is mostly semi-detached properties within 1 mile (2 km) of Godstone railway station in the modern settlement of South Godstone along a straight and parallel foot/cyclepath to the railway line. The first neighbourhood has a hall, whereas the second has a public house by a T-junction facing the path.

=== Roads ===
The village has a network of minor roads which are not heavily developed, for which reason it is described by the Victoria County History as "it in a peaceful area of the county that has always been tucked away" and has no A-roads.

== Demography ==
Crowhurst had a population in 2001 of 349. The next census, in 2011, recorded 281 people living in 119 households. Its area then was unchanged.

2011 Census Homes
Output area	Detached	Semi-detached	Terraced	Flats and apartments	Caravans/temporary/mobile homes	shared between households
(Civil Parish)	73	39	4	1	2	0

The accommodation in the parish included detached houses (28%), and apartments (22.6%).

2011 Census Key Statistics
Output area	Population	Households	% Owned outright	% Owned with a loan	hectares
(Civil Parish)	281	119	51.3%	31.9%	970

The proportion of households in the civil parish who owned their home outright compares to the regional average of 35.1%. The proportion who owned their home with a loan compares to the regional average of 32.5%. The remaining % is made up of rented dwellings (plus a negligible % of households living rent-free).
