= Harriet Crawley =

British writer and television presenter

Harriet Crawley (born 1948) is a British author, journalist, television presenter and art dealer.

She is daughter of British politician Aidan Crawley and American war correspondent Virginia Cowles. In 1987 she had a son, Spencer Henry Crawley. Later she married Gleb Shestakov in 1993 and then Julian Ayer around 2001.

Crawley unsuccessfully fought the Brent East Constituency in the 1987 general election running as a Conservative, she lost to Labour veteran Ken Livingstone.

Crawley is a fluent speaker of Russian, French, German and Italian, as well as English.

== Selected works ==
- Degree of Defiance 1969
- The Goddaughter (1975)
- The Lovers and the Loved (1990)
- The Painted Lady (1994)
- The Translator (2023)
