= River Spirit =

2023 novel by Leila Aboulela

- Author: Leila Aboulela
- Language: English
- Genre: Prose, Historical fiction
- Publisher: Grove press
- Publication date: March 7, 2023
- Pages: 320
- ISBN: 978-0-80-216066-9

River Spirit is a 2023 historical fiction novel written by Leila Aboulela and published by Grove Press. It is a historical narrative set during the 1880s in Sudan before Britain took over in 1898. It explores the conflict between both countries, Britain and Sudan as well as Christianity and Islam.

== Plot ==
When Akuany and her brother Bol lost their parents in a village attack in South Sudan, they were taken in by a kind merchant named Yaseen. He promises to take care of them, and this promise connects him to Akuany as they grow up. As a new leader, called the Mahdi, starts gaining power in Sudan and challenging the rule of the Ottomans, everyone has to decide which side they are on.

== Setting ==
The setting is primarily Sudan during the late 19th century, specifically in the city of Al-Ubayyid and on the journey from there to Khartoum. These locations are characterised by their arid desert landscapes, the presence of the White Nile river, and the oppressive atmosphere of war and captivity due to the Mahdist uprising. The passages depict a time of conflict, slavery, and hardship, with themes of survival and resilience amidst adversity.
