= Bird Summons =

2019 novel by Leila Aboulela

- First edition
- Author: Leila Aboulela
- Language: English
- Publisher: Weidenfeld & Nicolson
- Publication date: 7 March 2019
- Pages: 304
- ISBN: 1-474-60012-3

Bird Summons is a 2019 novel by British-Sudanese author Leila Aboulela. It was published by Weidenfeld & Nicolson Ltd an imprint of Orion Publishing Group.

== Plot summary ==
Salma, Moni, and Iman, friends from a Muslim women's group, take a trip to the Scottish Highlands. They're seeking more from life, but are afraid to take a chance. Salma is successful and married, but her past love is trying to win her back. Moni gave up her career to care for her disabled son, without help from her husband. Iman, who's been married three times, wants independence. A special bird, the Hoopoe, appears, making them think about their beliefs, love, and what they truly want.
