= Leila Aboulela =

Sudanese writer (born 1964)

Leila Aboulela FRSL
- ليلى ابوالعلا
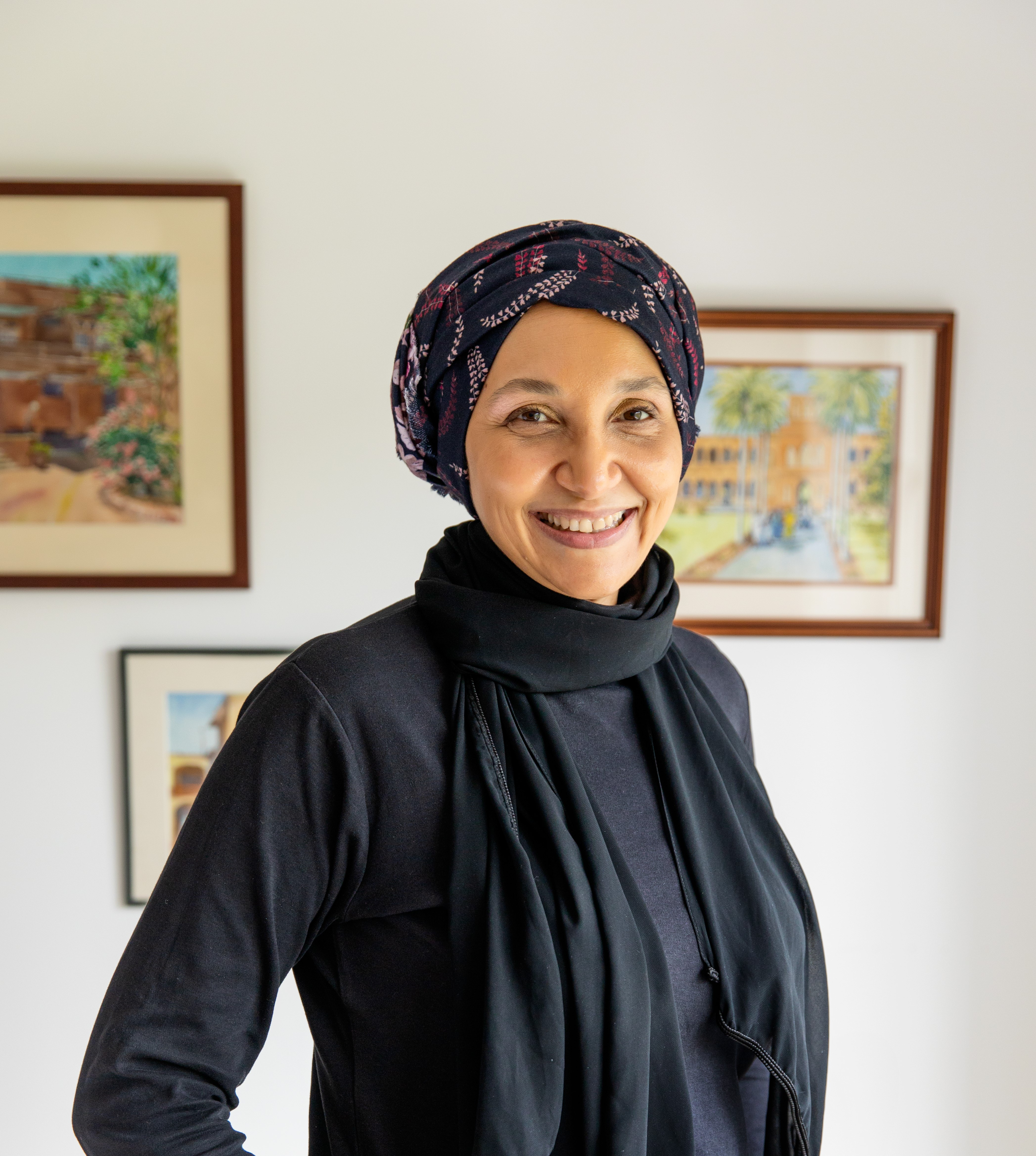
- Aboulela in 2019
- Born: 1964 (age 61–62); Cairo, Egypt
- Education: University of Khartoum and London School of Economics
- Occupation: Writer
- Children: 3
- Writing career
- Years active: 1999–present
- Subjects: Economics and Statistics
- Notable works: "The Museum"; The Translator; Lyrics Alley
- Notable awards: Caine Prize for African Writing; Fiction Winner of the Scottish Book Awards; Saltire Fiction Book of the Year; PEN Pinter Prize 2025
- Website: www.leila-aboulela.com

Leila Fuad Aboulela FRSL (Arabic:ليلى فؤاد ابوالعلا; born 1964) is a fiction writer, essayist, and playwright of Sudanese origin based in Aberdeen, Scotland. She grew up in Khartoum, Sudan, and in 1990 moved to Scotland, where she began her literary career. As of 2023, Aboulela has published six novels and several short stories, which have been translated into fifteen languages. Her most popular novels, Minaret (2005) and The Translator (1999) both feature the stories of Muslim women in the UK and were longlisted for the International Dublin Literary Award and Orange Prize. Aboulela's works have been included in publications such as Harper's Magazine, Granta, The Washington Post and The Guardian. BBC Radio has adapted her work extensively and broadcast a number of her plays, including The Insider, The Mystic Life and the historical drama The Lion of Chechnya. The five-part radio serialization of her 1999 novel The Translator was short-listed for the Race In the Media Award (RIMA).

Aboulela's work is critically acclaimed for its depiction of Muslim migrants in the West and the challenges they face. Her work is heavily influenced by her own experiences as an immigrant to the United Kingdom and the hardships she experienced during the transition. Her work centres on political issues and themes such as identity, multi-cultural relationships, the east–west divide, migration, and Islamic spirituality. Her prose has been celebrated by J. M. Coetzee, Ben Okri and Ali Smith. Her 2023 novel, River Spirit, was praised by Abdulrazak Gurnah for its "extraordinary sympathy and insight".

Aboulela was announced on 9 July 2025 as the winner of the PEN Pinter Prize, awarded annually by English PEN.

== Early life and education ==
Born in 1964 in Cairo, Egypt, to an Egyptian mother and a Sudanese father, Aboulela moved at the age of six weeks to Khartoum, Sudan, where she lived continuously until 1987. Aboulela's father comes from a prominent Sudanese family – his cousin is poet Hassan Awad Aboulela – and he studied at Victoria College in Egypt and Trinity College, Dublin. Her mother was a statistics professor at the University of Khartoum and the first demographer in Sudan after earning a PhD in the subject from a university in London. Her multicultural upbringing was marked by summer vacations in Cairo, where she was able to form a connection with her mother's family and absorb Egyptian culture through food, popular media, and film. As a child she attended the Khartoum American School and the Sisters' School, a private Catholic high school. She described her education at the American School as one with "very few Sudanese pupils and no Sudanese teachers". Aboulela grew up speaking both English and Arabic; however, she recalls being the victim of bullying at school due to her use of colloquial Egyptian Arabic, which she learned from her mother.

Aboulela later attended the University of Khartoum, graduating in 1985 with a degree in economics. In 1991, she was awarded a Master of Science (M.Sc.) degree and a Master of Philosophy (MPhil) degree in statistics from the London School of Economics. Her thesis is titled Stock and flow models for the Sudanese educational system.

== Personal life ==
As of 2012, Aboulela lives in Aberdeen, Scotland. Her husband, Nadir Mahjoub, an oil engineer, is half-Sudanese, half-British, a younger brother of the novelist Jamal Mahjoub, and she counts among the influences on her writing his English mother, the late Judith Mahjoub. They have three children together. In 1990, Aboulela moved to Aberdeen with her husband and children, a move she cites as the inspiration for her first novel, The Translator. Aboulela began writing in 1992 while working as a lecturer at Aberdeen College and later as a research assistant at the University of Aberdeen. In 2006, she moved back to Khartoum to care for her ailing father, who died in 2008. Between 2000 and 2012, Aboulela lived in Jakarta, Dubai, Abu Dhabi, and Doha. Aboulela is a devout Muslim, and her faith informs much of her written work.

== Literary career ==
Aboulela began writing at the age of 28, following a move to Aberdeen, Scotland, with her two young children spurred by her husband's work in the oil rigs. She began writing after enrolling in a creative writing course at the Aberdeen Central Library, where she was encouraged and supported by the writer-in-residence, Todd McEwen, who passed along Aboulela's work to his editor. Aboulela writes in English, a decision she dates back to her childhood, and notes that she chose to express herself in English because it was "a third language, refreshingly free from the disloyalty of having to choose between my father and my mother's tongues", in reference to Egyptian and Sudanese colloquial Arabic.

She is a contributor to the 2019 anthology New Daughters of Africa, edited by Margaret Busby, which compiles the work of 200 women writers of African descent. The anthology includes several genres such as autobiography, memoir, letters, short stories, novels, poetry, drama, humour, journalism, essays and speeches.

In a 2023 interview, Aboulela expressed her views on African historical novels and her motivation for using sources written in African languages:

"Mainstream history has been written by the coloniser. This is their truth. It is time for us to tell ours. When Africans write history, we are not necessarily saying something about the world today. Much of the motivation comes from wanting to tell our side of the story. I am more excited by African historical novels than by any other genre."

=== Novels ===
- The Translator: Originally published in 1999, The Translator, a Muslim retelling of Jane Eyre, is Aboulela's first novel. It tells the story of a Sudanese widow in Scotland who works as a translator and her relationship with her secular Scottish employer. In 2006, The Translator was listed by The New York Times as one of the 100 Notable Books of the Year.
- Minaret: Published in 2005, Minaret is centred on Najwa, who was forced to flee Sudan and live in exile in London following a coup that overthrew the regime her father, a minister, served under. Najwa's story is one of culture shock, love, islamophobia, and immigration. It also describes a young woman's journey to survive and find a home in a new, unfamiliar environment.
- Lyrics Alley: First published in 2010, Lyrics Alley is Aboulela's third novel and the winner of the Scottish Book of the Year award for fiction. Lyrics Alley is directly inspired by the life of her uncle, poet Hassan Awad Aboulela. Set in post-colonial 1950s Sudan, this novel tells the story of a country in transition through the life of an affluent family as they lose the life they had been accustomed to and suffer a devastating tragedy, which alters their dynamic and lives forever.
- The Kindness of Enemies: Published in 2015, The Kindness of Enemies depicts the story of a half-Russian, half-Sudanese professor who embarks on a journey to document the life of a Muslim historical figure, Imam Shamil, who gained notoriety through his leading role in the anti-Russian resistance movement of the Caucasian War. Set in 2010, the book also tackles the theme of life as a Muslim in the post-9/11 era.
- Bird Summons: Published in 2019, Bird Summons is a story of three Muslim women who travel to the Scottish Highlands to visit the grave of Lady Evelyn Cobbold, the first British woman to complete the Hajj pilgrimage to Mecca. The trip evolves into one of adventure and self discovery for the women. The freedom afforded to them through the distance from their homes and the lush Scottish landscape inspires them to reflect on their lives and the decisions which brought them to where they are.
- River Spirit: Published in 2023, this novel takes place in Sudan of the 1880s. Major themes include the Mahdist War against Anglo-Turkish rule and slavery in 19th-century Sudan. Apart from historical figures such as the Mahdi Muhammad Ahmed and Governor Charles Gordon, Abouleila imagined several female characters to bear witness to their roles in society. One of the story's main characters is Akuany, an orphaned girl from the South, who is sold into slavery, and becomes part of the household of the merchant Yaseen.

=== Short-story collections ===
- Coloured Lights: Originally published in 2001, Coloured Lights is Aboulela's first short-story collection. It contains eleven short stories. The collection features the stories of young Sudanese women in varying settings, as they navigate their lives in search of meaning and belonging. Many of the stories depict the immigrant experience and the challenges of transitioning from life in the East to the culture of the West. Aboulela's short story "The Museum" – which is included in Coloured Lights – was awarded the inaugural Caine Prize for African Writing in 2000. It recounts the story of a Sudanese student in Aberdeen and her first date with her Scottish classmate. The titular museum refers to the story's critique of the exhibition of African art in Scottish museums and the colonial legacy of institutions.
- Elsewhere, Home: Published in 2018, this anthology was awarded the Saltire Fiction Book of the Year award and contains thirteen short stories. Depicting tales of multicultural relationships, friendships, and loss, Elsewhere, Home is a collection of stories that follow the lives of characters as they transform and reinvent themselves. The stories are set in Abu Dhabi, Aberdeen, Edinburgh, and London. In Pages of Fruit, a lonely housewife travels to the Edinburgh book festival to meet an author whom she idolizes, only to find herself aimless and disappointed following their ill-fated meeting. Meanwhile, in Something Old, Something New, a Scottish Muslim convert visits Khartoum to see his Sudanese fiancée and begins to experience doubt regarding their relationship when confronted with his feelings of suspicion and fear of foreigners in a faraway land.

=== Plays ===
Aboulela has written several radio plays, with many of them not published in print form. Her plays The Insider, The Mystic Life, The Lion of Chechnya, and The Sea Warrior were broadcast on BBC radio programmes. The Mystic Life is an adaptation of a story from her short-story collection, Coloured Lights, while The Lion of Chechnya recounts the story of Imam Shamil (1797–1871), a Muslim political leader and the subject of her novel, The Kindness of Enemies. Her novel The Translator and her short story "The Museum" were also adapted into radio plays, while her stage play Friends and Neighbours was performed in Aberdeen in 1998.

== Literary influences ==
Much of Aboulela's writing is directly inspired by her own life. She credits her move from Sudan to Scotland in 1990 as being the catalyst for her literary career and cites her desire to write about Sudan and Islam—topics that she had seen scarcely represented—for being her preliminary motivators. Aboulela has stated her interest in countering stereotypical portrayals of Muslims, Sudan, and immigrants through her writing and has made an effort to reflect people she has met and places she has lived within her stories. Her novel Lyrics Alley is based on the true story of the life of her uncle, poet Hassan Awad Aboulela, and his tragic accident in the early 1940s, which left him paraplegic. She collaborated with her father to write the novel and learn more about the life of his cousin, who served as an inspiration for the main character, Nur.

Aboulela cites Egyptian Nobel Prize laureate Naguib Mahfouz and acclaimed Sudanese writer Tayeb Salih as literary influences from her childhood and time in Sudan. Her move to Scotland introduced her to Jean Rhys and Anita Desai, authors whom she notes as having a "haunting influence on her works". Aboulela has indicated her attraction to authors such as Abdulrazak Gurnah, Doris Lessing, Buchi Emecheta, and Ahdaf Soueif who migrated to Britain at a young age and thus possess similar experiences to her own. She also acknowledges the influence of Scottish writers, such as Alan Spence and Robin Jenkins.

== Critical reception ==
Aboulela's works have received overwhelmingly positive critical reception, and she was celebrated by the likes of Ben Okri, Nobel Prize winner J. M. Coetzee, and Ali Smith for her mastery of both the novel and short-story formats, as well as for her unique prose. She was referred to as "one of the best short story writers alive" by editor and author John Freeman. Her prose impressed Kim Hedges of the San Francisco Chronicle, who wrote: "Aboulela's prose is amazing. She handles intense emotions in a contained yet powerful way, lending their expressions directness and originality, and skillfully capturing the discrete sensory impressions that compound to form a mood."

She is recognized for her nuanced depictions of Muslim immigrants, the intricacies of inter-cultural relationships, Islam, and female characters who subvert social expectations. She was complimented by journalist Boyd Tonkin for being “One of the few Muslim women writers in Britain to present their faith as a living force rather than discarded history”.

Among her works, her second novel Minaret (2005) has drawn the most critical attention. This work signaled Aboulela's arrival as an influential member of a new wave of British Muslim writers. Minaret was lauded as a "brilliant success" and a "beautiful, daring, challenging novel" by Mike Phillips writing for The Guardian.

She is considered an African, Arab, Scottish, and diasporic female author by her audience of critics, literary prize boards, and researchers. Author James Robinson described Aboulela as "a unique and refreshing voice in contemporary Scottish fiction". John A. Stotesbury and Brendan Smyth argue that Aboulela has asserted her role in the literary sphere as an author who challenges Orientalist and Islamic perceptions of masculinity as well as the popular conception of Muslim women. Aboulela's work has also become a popular topic for PhD theses and scholarly articles surrounding Muslim and contemporary women's writing.

In December 2023, her novel River Spirit was named by The New York Times one of the 10 best historical fiction books of 2023. Further, this novel was selected by Brittle Paper literary magazine as one of the 100 Notable African Books of 2023.

== Bibliography ==
- 1999: The Translator, Grove Press, Black Cat – translated into Arabic by Elkhatim Adl'an.
- 2001: Coloured Lights, Polygon, Edinburgh.
- 2005: Minaret, Grove Press, Black Cat – translated into Arabic by Badreldin Hashimi.
- 2011: Lyrics Alley, Grove Press – translated into Arabic by Badreldin Hashimi.
- 2015: The Kindness of Enemies, Weidenfeld & Nicolson – translated into Arabic by Badreldin Hashimi.
- 2018: Elsewhere, Home, Telegram Books.
- 2019: Bird Summons, Weidenfeld & Nicolson.
- 2023: River Spirit, Grove Atlantic, Saqi Books ISBN 978-0802160669

== Prizes and awards ==
- 2000: Caine Prize for African Writing, for "The Museum".
- 2000: Saltire Society Scottish First Book of the Year Award (shortlist), The Translator.
- 2002: PEN Macmillan Macmillan Silver PEN Award (shortlist), Coloured Lights.
- 2003: Race and Media Award (shortlist – radio drama serialisation), The Translator.
- 2011: Shortlisted for the Commonwealth Writers Prize- Europe and S. E Asia, Lyrics Alley.
- 2011: Fiction Winner of the Scottish Book Awards, Lyrics Alley.
- 2018: Saltire Fiction Book of the Year Award, Elsewhere, Home.
- 2023: Elected Fellow of the Royal Society of Literature.
- 2025: PEN Pinter Prize.

== See also ==
- Sudanese literature
- List of Sudanese writers
- Modern Arabic literature
