= Virginia Cowles =

American journalist (1910–1983)

- Born: Harriet Virginia Spencer; August 24, 1910; Brattleboro, Vermont, U.S.
- Died: September 17, 1983 (aged 73) southwest France (near Biarritz)
- Occupations: War correspondent, author
- Spouse: Aidan Crawley (m. 1945)
- Children: Andrew, Harriet, Randall
- Writing career
- Period: 1930–1983
- Genres: War, travel, biography

Harriet Virginia Spencer Cowles OBE (August 24, 1910 – September 17, 1983) was an American journalist, biographer, and travel writer. During her long career, Cowles went from covering fashion, to covering the Spanish Civil War, the turbulent period in Europe leading up to World War II, and the entire war. Her service as a correspondent was recognized by the British government with an OBE in 1947. After the war, she published a number of critically acclaimed biographies of historical figures. In 1983, while traveling with her husband, she was killed in an automobile accident which left him severely injured.

== Early life ==
Cowles was born in 1910 in Brattleboro, Vermont to Dr. Edward Spencer Cowles and his wife Florence Wolcott Cowles, née Jacquith. In the 1930s, she started to work as a journalist in the United States. After first working on the gossip columns of Boston and New York newspapers — for which she wrote mainly about fashion, love, and society — she moved to foreign reporting.

== Spanish Civil War ==
Cowles went to Spain in 1936, with the intention of becoming a war correspondent, despite her relative youth and lack of experience. Her coverage from Spain was notably different from that of many of her contemporaries like Martha Gellhorn (a staunch supporter of the Republican cause)) in that she was determined to cover the war from both sides. Some of her most notable reporting came from Republican sources, such as her interview with Pepe Quintanilla the chief executioner of Madrid. She reported on the Spanish Civil War for the Daily Telegraph, the Sunday Times, and the Hearst newspapers.

Cowles' first book, published in early 1941, Looking For Trouble, details both her experiences in the war, and the small community of foreign war correspondents that developed there, which included Hemingway, Gellhorn and others who would go on to cover World War II. Cowles wrote the book to convey her belief that America should enter World War II. She included in it her telling account of claustrophobia at a Nuremberg Rally, and her experience of Hitler's diminishment as he left the stand:

His small figure suddenly became drab and unimpressive. You had to pinch yourself to realize that this was the man on whom the eyes of the world were riveted; that he alone held the lightning in his hands.

== World War II ==
After leaving Spain, Cowles reported from all over Europe, shuttling between Russia, Germany, Czechoslovakia, Finland, and France during 1939 and 1940. For the Sunday Times, she reported on the Winter War, before returning to England in 1940 after the fall of France. She witnessed the first day of The Blitz, and continued to report on the Battle of Britain throughout, writing from Dover how "You knew the fate of civilization was being decided fifteen thousand feet above your head in a world of sun, wind and sky".

From 1942 to 1943 she worked for John G. Winant, the American Ambassador in London. For the Sunday Times and the Chicago Sun she reported on the North African Campaign. Cowles missed journalism and returned to reporting, from Italy and France in 1944–45.

== Later career ==
In the following four decades Cowles achieved considerable commercial success with a long series of political individual and family biographies. Critics often complained about the lack of sharpness and reliability of her historical analysis, but praised the accuracy of her insight into humanity. She was awarded the Order of the British Empire in 1947.

== Personal life ==
In 1945, Cowles married Aidan Crawley, a British politician, journalist, television executive and author. They had three children, two sons and a daughter: Andrew, Harriet, and Randall. Cowles was killed in an automobile accident in 1983, in the car her husband was driving.

== Bibliography ==
=== Selected books ===
- Looking for Trouble, (journalistic experiences), Harper, (1941) OCLC 1672714; reissued by Faber, (2021) with an introduction by Christina Lamb
- How America Is Governed, Lutterworth, (1944);
- No Cause for Alarm, Harpers, (1949) OCLC 588742 (published in England as No Cause for Alarm: A Study of Trends in England Today, Hamish Hamilton, (1949);
- Winston Churchill: The Era and the Man, Harper, (1953) OCLC 936813;
- Gay Monarch: The Life and Pleasures of Edward VII, Harper, (1956) OCLC 400663 (published in England as Edward VII and His Circle, Hamish Hamilton, 1956);
- The Phantom Major: The Story of David Stirling and His Desert Command, Harper, (1958) (published in England as The Phantom Major: The Story of David Stirling and the S.A.S. Regiment, Collins, (1958), junior edition, (1962);
- The Great Swindle: The Story of the South Sea Bubble, Harper, (1960);
- The Kaiser, Harper, (1963);
- 1913: The Defiant Swan Song, Weidenfeld & Nicolson, (1967);
- The Russian Dagger: Cold War in the Days of the Czars, Harper, (1969);
- The Romanovs, Harper, (1971) ISBN 978-0-00-211724-1;
- The Rothschilds: A Family of Fortune, Knopf, (1973);
- The Last Tsar and Tsarina, Weidenfeld &; Nicolson, (1977);
- The Astors: the Story of a Transatlantic Family, Weidenfeld & Nicolson, (1979) ISBN 029777624X;
- The Great Marlborough and His Duchess, Weidenfeld & Nicolson, (1983) ISBN 0025285807;

=== Plays ===
- Love Goes to Press: A Comedy in Three Acts (USA 1947), University of Nebraska Press, (2nd ed. 2010) Cowles co-authored the play with friend and colleague Martha Gellhorn. The play is about a group of war correspondents on the Italian front. Cowles met Gellhorn, a future wife of Ernest Hemingway, while the two women were covering the Spanish Civil War.

=== Articles ===
Contributor of articles to various periodicals and magazines, including Vogue, Harper's, and The American Mercury.

== See also ==
- Mary Welsh Hemingway
- Tania Long
- William L. Shirer
