= Aidan Crawley =

British journalist and politician (1908-1993)

Aidan Crawley MBE
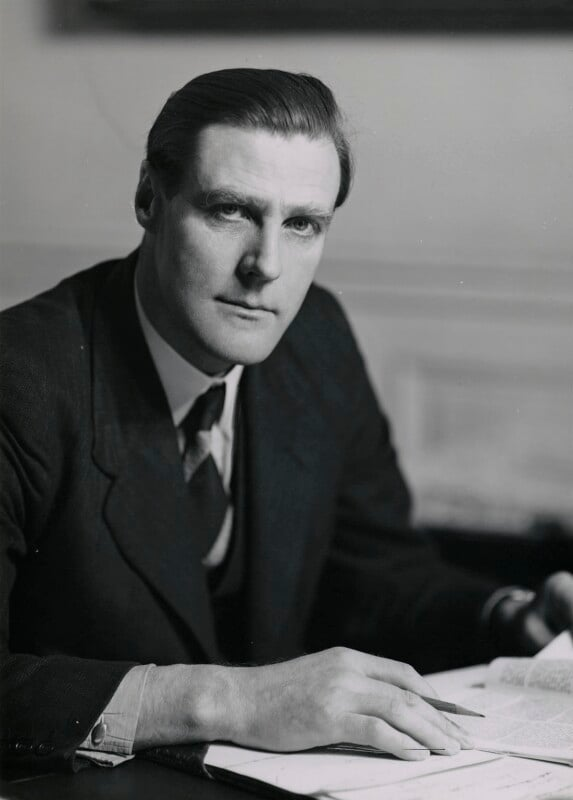
- Crawley in 1950

Member of Parliament for West Derbyshire
- In office 6 June 1962 – 25 October 1967
- Preceded by: Edward Wakefield
- Succeeded by: James Scott-Hopkins

Member of Parliament for Buckingham
- In office 5 July 1945 – 5 October 1951
- Preceded by: Lionel Berry
- Succeeded by: Frank Markham

Personal details
- Born: Aidan Merivale Crawley; 10 April 1908 Benenden, Kent, England
- Died: 3 November 1993 (aged 85) Banbury, Oxfordshire, England
- Party: Labour (until 1957); Conservative
- Spouse: Virginia Cowles (m. 1945; died 1983)
- Children: 3, including Harriet
- Education: Trinity College, Oxford

Aidan Merivale Crawley MBE (10 April 1908 – 3 November 1993) was a British journalist, television executive and editor, and politician. He was a member of both of Britain's major political parties: the Labour Party and Conservative Party, and was elected to the House of Commons as a Labour MP from 1945 to 1951, and as a Conservative MP from 1962 to 1967.

== Education ==
Crawley was educated at Harrow School and Trinity College, Oxford. He played cricket for both Harrow and for Oxford University Cricket Club. He scored 87 in the 1926 Eton v Harrow match at Lord's, an innings which Wisden described as "widely regarded as the best innings in the match for many year", and he was described in the same publication as a "beautiful player". In 1928 he set a new record for runs scored in a season for Oxford with 1,137 runs scored, and in 1929 scored 204 against Northamptonshire.

== Life and career ==
Crawley had a varied career, playing first-class cricket, serving in the armed forces, acting as a Member of Parliament for two political parties, making documentary films and serving as the first chairman of London Weekend Television.

=== Cricket career ===
Aidan Crawley
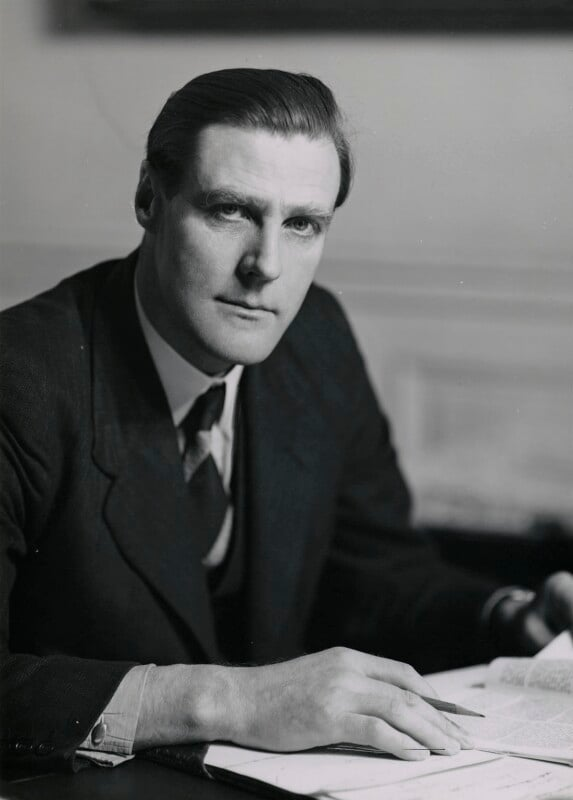

Personal information
- Full name: Aidan Merivale Crawley
- Batting: Right-handed
- Bowling: Right arm medium

Domestic team information
- Years: Team
- 1927–1930: Oxford University
- 1927–1947: Kent

Career statistics
Competition	First-class
Matches	87
Runs scored	5,061
Batting average	37.48
100s/50s	11/24
Top score	204
Balls bowled	949
Wickets	15
Bowling average	37.66
5 wickets in innings	0
10 wickets in match	0
Best bowling	2/40
Catches/stumpings	44/–
- Source: CricInfo, 30 May 2016

Crawley made his first-class cricket debut in May 1927, playing for Oxford University against Harlequins. Later the same year he made his County Championship debut for Kent County Cricket Club against Worcestershire as an amateur cricketer. The bulk of Crawley's first-class cricket career was in the late 1920s and early 1930s. He made at least ten first-class appearances in each year between 1927 and 1932 and made a total of 87 first-class appearances, the majority during this period. He played a total of 39 times for Oxford and 33 for Kent as well as eight times for Marylebone Cricket Club (MCC) as well as making a few appearances for other teams such as the Free Foresters.

He played only six more first-class matches after the end of the 1932 season, four of which took place after the Second World War whilst he was a sitting MP. He also made four Minor Counties Championship appearances for Buckinghamshire in 1948 and was president of MCC in 1972-73 and the chairman of the National Cricket Association for seven years, during which time he was one of the driving forces behind the establishment of the National Village Cricket Championship.

=== Services career ===
He joined the Auxiliary Air Force in 1936, and was a trained fighter pilot at start of the Second World War. After serving on night patrols over the English Channel he was sent ostensibly as an assistant air attaché to Turkey in April 1940, cover for intelligence work in the Balkans in Yugoslavia and Bulgaria, being smuggled out of Sofia when the Germans invaded the latter country in March 1941. Subsequently, assigned to 73 Squadron in Egypt, he was shot down in July 1941 near besieged Tobruk and was taken prisoner of war. He remained in Germany, despite escape attempts, latterly at Stalag Luft III.

=== Parliamentary career ===
Crawley was Labour Member of Parliament for Buckingham from 1945 to 1951, when he lost to the Conservative candidate Frank Markham, himself an ex-Labour MP. He was Under-Secretary of State for Air in Clement Attlee's Labour Government. Having left the Labour Party in 1957, in 1962, he was elected to Parliament as a Conservative, winning the by-election in West Derbyshire. He held the seat through two general elections, before resigning in 1967 to become Chairman of London Weekend Television where he remained until 1973.

=== Media career ===
In 1955, he was the first editor-in-chief of Independent Television News and was responsible for introducing American-style newscasters to British media and pledged to transform television's attitudes to politicians. He left ITN after a row when the company tried to trim down the news operations and rejoined the BBC.

Crawley wrote several books, including biographies of Konrad Adenauer and Charles De Gaulle.

- De Gaulle: A Biography (London: Collins, 1969)
- Escape from Germany. A History of R.A.F. Escapes during the War (1956)
- Spoils of the War: The Rise of Western Germany 1945-1972
- Patterns of Government in Africa
- Leap before you look: a memoir (1988).

== Family ==
Crawley was the second son of the Rev. (Arthur) Stafford Crawley, Canon of Windsor. His paternal grandfather was George Baden Crawley, a successful railway contractor and his wife Inez.

Stafford Crawley was the brother-in-law of the Earl of Cavan and Crawley's mother was related to the Lords Wraxall, of Tyntesfield and the Lords Aldenham and Hunsdon. Stafford Crawley was chaplain to the Archbishop of York at Bishopthorpe and later Canon of St George's Chapel, Windsor. The Crawleys had three sons and two daughters, of whom Aidan was the middle son. A daughter Anstice, Lady Goodman (see below), was also prominent in public life.

== Marriage and issue ==
In 1945, he married the sometime war correspondent Virginia Cowles, daughter of the controversial society doctor Edward Spencer Cowles MD, with whom he had 3 children.

Crawley suffered several tragedies. His wife died in 1983 in a road accident near Biarritz in France. Five years later, he lost both his sons in a plane crash whilst they were travelling together to their sister's 40th birthday party, leaving young children and widows who were seven months pregnant. He then lost heavily in the Lloyd's crash and at the time of his death, Crawley was virtually penniless.

He was survived by his daughter Harriet, his two widowed daughters-in-law and six grandchildren:

- Andrew Hayward Crawley (1947−1988), married Sarah Lawrence in 1986 and had one son and a posthumous daughter.
- Randall Stafford Crawley (1950–1988), who married Marita Georgina Phillips in 1982. Their two sons (the younger Galen born after his death) and a daughter. His widow Marita remarried Andrew Knight in 2006.
- Harriet Spencer Crawley (b. 1948), a successful author and former television presenter of Collecting Now, married Gleb Shestakov in 1993 and then Julian Ayer in around 2001. Ayer, whom she met in 1999, was the adoptive son of the philosopher Sir Alfred Jules Ayer. They had no children although Harriet had one son in 1987: Harriet unsuccessfully fought the Brent East Constituency in the 1987 general election, she lost to Labour veteran Ken Livingstone.
  - Spencer Henry Crawley (b.1987) who played one first-class cricket match for Oxford University.

== Notable relatives ==
- Crawley's sister was Anstice, Lady Goodman (7 December 1911 – 4 January 2001), whose marriage to Sir Victor Goodman was childless.
- Crawley's niece Penelope Anstice Crawley (b. 1950) married 1971 Lord Guernsey, now 12th Earl of Aylesford (b. 1947), the heir to the 11th Earl of Aylesford and has issue, including one son. Her husband succeeded to the earldom on 12 February 2008, and her son is now styled Lord Guernsey. This is not the first notable marriage for a Crawley female; her great-aunt Caroline Inez Crawley (d. 1920, without issue) was first wife of Field Marshal the 10th Earl of Cavan.
- An ancestress Matilda Crawley-Boevey (1817–1877), of the Crawley-Boevey baronets married William Gibbs of Tyntesfield and Clyst St. George, and had issue, seven children, of whom four are listed in the Plantagenet Roll. Her granddaughter Anstice Katharine Gibbs married a Crawley cousin (Arthur Stafford Crawley) in 1903, and was mother of Aidan Merivale Crawley. Anstice's brother was 1st Baron Wraxall, while close relatives patrilineally were the Lords Aldenham and Hunsdon (now united as of 1939).

== Notes ==
Parliament of the United Kingdom
Preceded by Lionel Berry	Member of Parliament for Buckingham; 1945–1951	Succeeded by Frank Markham
Preceded by Edward Wakefield	Member of Parliament for West Derbyshire; 1962–1967	Succeeded by James Scott-Hopkins
