= Crowhurst Place =

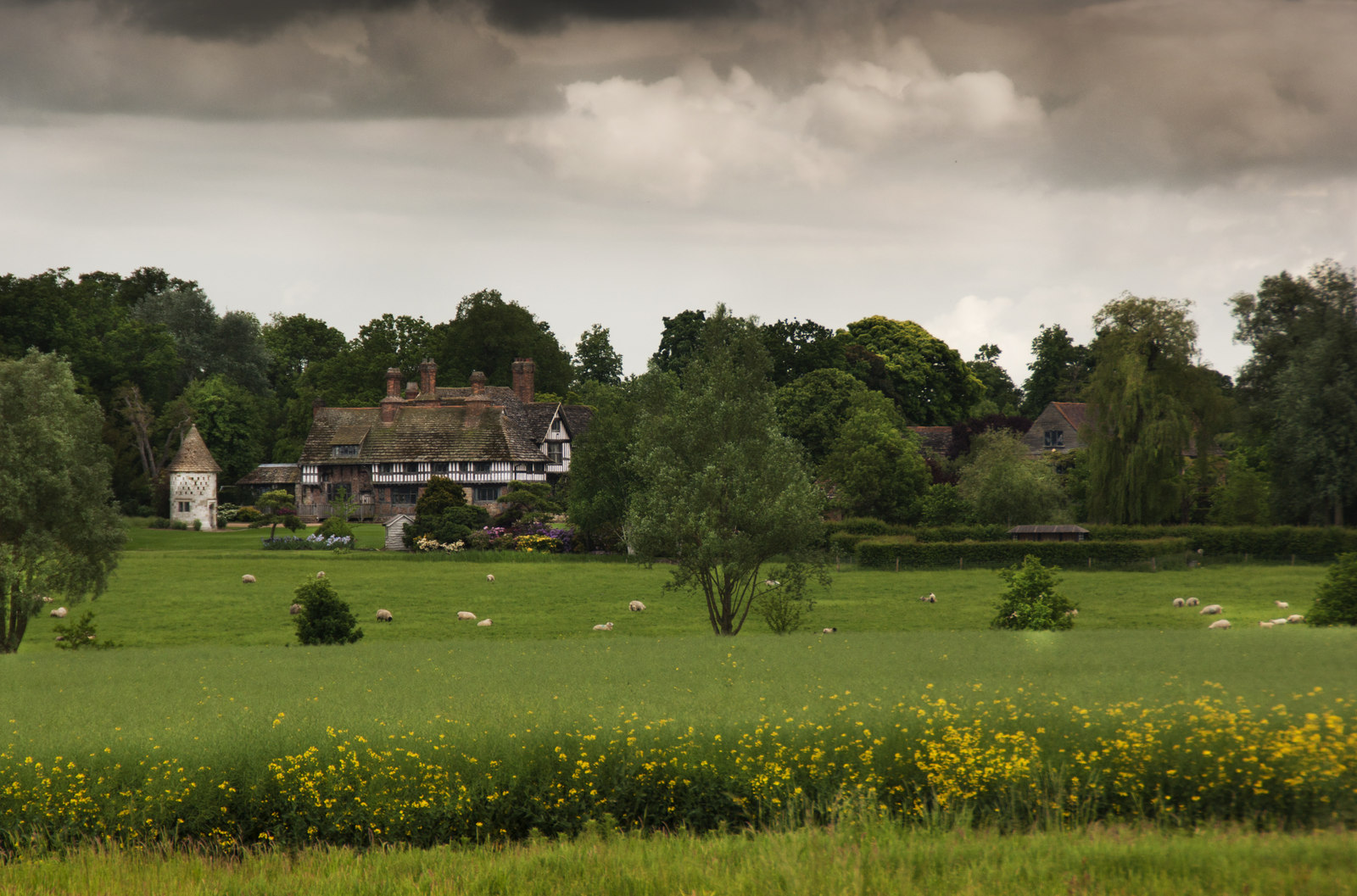
- "an extreme example of the English flight from reality around the 1914-18 war"

- Location within Surrey
- 51°11′59″N 0°01′01″W
- Type: House
- Location: Crowhurst, Surrey

History
- Built: 15th century, restoration and expansion 1911-1915

Site notes
- Architect: George A. Crawley
- Architectural style: Tudor Revival
- Governing body: Privately owned
- Owner: Consuelo Vanderbilt

Listed Building – Grade I
- Official name: Crowhurst Place
- Designated: 9 March 1982
- Reference no.: 1280991

Listed Building – Grade II*
- Official name: Granary and barn southwest of Crowhurst Place
- Designated: 9 March 1982
- Reference no.: 1029424

Listed Building – Grade II
- Official name: Dovecot north of Crowhurst Place
- Designated: 9 March 1982
- Reference no.: 1029925

Listed Building – Grade II
- Official name: Barn west of Crowhurst Place
- Designated: 11 June 1958
- Reference no.: 1029924

Listed Building – Grade II
- Official name: Gate lodge to Crowhurst Place
- Designated: 9 March 1982
- Reference no.: 1029926

Crowhurst Place, Crowhurst, Surrey, England is a medieval hall house dating from the early 15th century. In the 20th century, the house was reconstructed and enlarged by George A. Crawley, firstly for himself and subsequently for Consuelo Vanderbilt, Duchess of Marlborough. It is a Grade I listed building.

== History ==
The origins of Crowhurst Place are those of a traditional hall house of the early 15th century. It was built for the Gaynesfords, a family of wealthy yeomen. Ian Nairn, Nikolaus Pevsner and Bridget Cherry, in the 1971 revised Surrey Pevsner Buildings of England, give a construction date of circa. 1425. In the early 20th century, the estate was bought by George A. Crawley, a decorator and designer rather than a trained architect, who developed a small, but successful practice in reconstructing traditional buildings in a Tudor Revival style. Working firstly for himself, and subsequently for Consuelo Vanderbilt, (Note: Adrian Tinniswood, in his study, The Long Weekend: Life in the English Country House between the Wars, suggests that the connection between George Crawley and Consuelo Vanderbilt was probably through John Shaffer Phipps, an American millionaire with an English wife, for whom Crawley designed Westbury House in New York State.) Crawley greatly expanded the original medieval hall house. The result, "remarkable in its own right", saw Crawley add extensions, chimneys, gables, linenfold panelling and large amounts of half-timbering. Life at Crowhurst in the early stages of reconstruction was not without its challenges. Crawley's friend, and biographer, the politician Cuthbert Headlam, recorded the first Christmas celebrated at the house, in his memoir of Crawley. Guests were obliged to huddle together for warmth in front of the fireplace in the great hall, as drifts of snow gusted in through large cracks in the building's frame. Ultimately, the discomfort proved too great for Crawley's wife, and the house was sold to Consuelo Vanderbilt in 1910.

Consuelo Vanderbilt, great-granddaughter of Commodore Cornelius Vanderbilt, had married the 9th Duke of Marlborough in 1895. The marriage brought status and social position to the Vanderbilts, and money to the Marlboroughs, but happiness to neither Consuelo nor her husband. By 1906, they were living apart, although they did not divorce until 1921. In searching for a new home after her separation, Consuelo was drawn to Crowhurst Place, its Tudor appearance a stark contrast to the Baroque grandeur of Blenheim Palace, a house she loathed. Crawley continued work on the house for its new owner, with ultimately over half the building being rebuilt or constructed afresh on old foundations, and the remainder being heavily restored. Consuelo remained at the house until 1921, when she moved to France following her second marriage to Jacques Balsan, an aviator and entrepreneur.

Martin Conway, writing in Country Life, considered Crawley's reconstruction gave the remains of the original manor, "a beauty far greater than was ever theirs in the days of its newness". Nairn, Pevsner and Cherry note the sense of escapism which inspired much of the Tudor Revival, calling Crowhurst, "an extreme example of the English flight from reality around the 1914-18 war".

Later owners of Crowhurst Place included Sir John Davis, Chairman of The Rank Organisation, and Adam Faith, the singer. (Note: Adam Faith reportedly derived considerable pleasure in purchasing the house from Sir John, for whom he had previously worked as a tea boy. Faith subsequently attempted to sell the house, firstly to Rod Stewart and then to Ridley Scott.) As at 2020, the house was for sale.

== Architecture and description ==
The house is approached over a drawbridge, which crosses a defensive moat. The original buildings comprise the central hall, with a single further chamber separated by a screens passage. The North and South wings are additions by Crawley, who also altered the roofline, adding a porch, an oriel window and an array of Tudoresque chimney stacks. The main block is of two storeys, with a six-bay frontage. The construction materials are timber, with brick and stone plinths and brick infilling.

Crowhurst Place is a Grade I listed building. The lodge, and a dovecot, are both by Crawley, date from around 1920 and are both listed Grade II. A granary and barn on the estate are 15th century in origin and are listed Grade II*, while another barn is later, of the 16th century, and is listed Grade II.

== Sources ==
- Aslet, Clive (1982). The Last Country Houses. New Haven, US and London: Yale University Press. ISBN 978-0-300-02904-8.
- Aslet, Clive; Powers, Alan (1985). The National Trust Book of the English House. Harmondsworth, UK: Penguin Books. ISBN 9780140065084. OCLC 904188923.
- Aslet, Clive (2013). An Exuberant Catalogue of Dreams. London: Aurum Press. ISBN 978-1-781-31094-6. OCLC 840477309.
- Ditchfield, Peter Hempson (1985) [1910]. The Manor Houses of England. London: Bracken Books. ISBN 978-0-946-49526-9. OCLC 16998484.
- Nairn, Ian; Pevsner, Nikolaus; Cherry, Bridget (1971). Surrey. The Buildings of England. Middlesex, England: Penguin Books. ISBN 0-300-09675-5.
- Stafford, David; Stafford, Caroline (2015). Big Time: The Life of Adam Faith. London: Omnibus Press. ISBN 978-1-783-05552-4.
- Tinniswood, Adrian (2016). The Long Weekend: Life in the English Country House Between the Wars. London: Jonathan Cape. ISBN 978-1-448-19124-6. OCLC 951261677.
- Stuart, Amanda Mackenzie (2005). Consuelo and Alva Vanderbilt. London: Harper Collins. ISBN 978-0-066-21418-4.
