= Edward Pitkin Cowles =

American judge

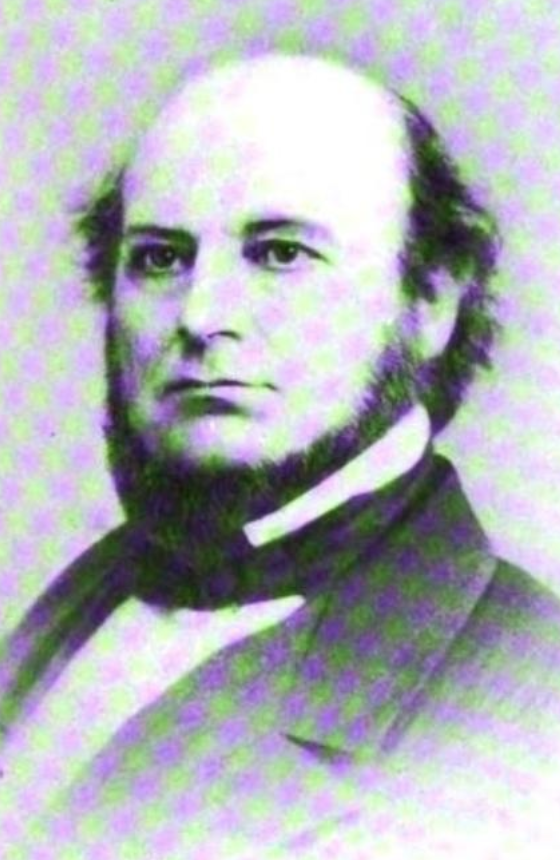
- Cowles, from a 1918 publication
- Born: January 1815; North Canaan, Connecticut, U.S.
- Died: December 2, 1874 (aged 59); Chicago, Illinois, U.S.
- Occupation(s): Lawyer, judge

Edward Pitkin Cowles (January 1815 – December 2, 1874) was a justice of the Supreme Court of New York.

== Early life and education ==
Cowles, son of Pitkin Cowles and Fanny (Smith) Cowles, was born in North Canaan, Connecticut, January 1815. His father was a Presbyterian clergyman. He graduated from Yale College in 1836. Early in 1837 he began the study of law in the office of Ambrose L. Jordan, of Hudson, New York.

== Career ==
Cowles was admitted to the bar in 1839, and began practice in Hudson, where his younger brother, David S. Cowles, was subsequently associated with him. He had attained a prominent position in the bar of Columbia County when, in 1853, he removed his office to the city of New York. In the spring of 1855 he was appointed Judge of the Supreme Court of New York. He resigned the appointment in the following winter, but was reappointed to fill a vacancy caused by the death of Judge Robert H. Morris. Subsequently, a claim having been made to the seat by Hon. Henry E. Davies by virtue of an election, Cowles retired in his favor, and was for several years occupied mainly in hearing cases as referee, but at length resumed general practice.

== Personal life ==
Cowles married Sarah Ely Boies in 1852, and they had four sons. He continued to reside in New York until about 1871, when he removed to Rye, Westchester County. He left home in October 1874, for a visit to California, and there met with a slight injury, which resulted, while on his return, in his death, at Chicago, from gangrene, on December 2, 1874.
