= Thomas Crowhurst =

English cricketer

Thomas Richard Crowhurst (January 1811 – 19 March 1877) was an English cricketer active in 1832 who played for a Gentlemen of Kent team. He was born in Birling, Kent, christened there on 13 January 1811, and died in St Mary Cray, Kent. He appeared in one first-class match, scoring two runs with a highest score of 1 and taking one catch.
