= George Baden Crawley =

British railway contractor (1833–1879)

- Born: 4 September 1833; St Pancras, London
- Died: 25 September 1879 (aged 46); Veracruz, Mexico
- Occupation: Railway Contractor

George Baden Crawley (4 September 1833 – 25 September 1879) was a British railway contractor responsible for the construction of railways in Belgium, Spain, Mexico, Georgia, Romania, and Hungary.

== Early life ==
Crawley was born on 4 September 1833 in Upper Gower Street, London to George Abraham and Caroline Crawley. He was educated at Harrow School where he excelled in sports, particularly cricket, making the winning hit in the match with Eton College at Lord's in 1851, and becoming an excellent tennis player in later life, playing against Charles Gilbert Heathcote at Brighton the year before his death. He initially followed his father's career, training as a solicitor, but found the profession too sedentary for his adventurous spirit and switched to a career in civil engineering.

== Career ==
He established the contracting company George B. Crawley and Company which won contracts to construct two railway lines in Belgium, two in Spain and the Transcaucasus Railway of nearly 300 miles from Tiflis to Poti in Georgia. In the 1860s the British-owned railway company, Imperial Mexican Railway (later known as the Mexican Railway) took over the main contract for the construction of a railway line from Mexico City to Veracruz from the French Government and Crawley's company was sub-contracted to build the line. His last work was a railway from Ploiești in Romania to Brașov in Austria-Hungary.

== Family ==
In 1863 he married Eliza Inez Hulbert at East Farleigh, Kent, the daughter of Henry Hulbert. The couple had at least seven children: George Abraham Crawley (1864–1926), Henry Ernest Crawley (1865–1931), Eustace Crawley (1868–1914), John Kenneth Crawley (1873–1943), Arthur Stafford Crawley (1876–1948), Caroline Inez Crawley (married 1893, died 1920), and Georgina Beatrice Crawley (CBE) (died 1968).

A biography of Eliza's eldest son, George Abraham, paints a picture of Mrs Crawley as "a perfect hostess, kindly and warm-hearted, and her children and their friends were always welcome. Her energy and "joie de vivre" enabled her, even in old age, to throw herself with enthusiasm into the interests of the young. She was an excellent musician with a charming voice, which her children and grandchildren have inherited, and she inspired and led the music that was always a feature of her entertaining at shooting parties, cricket matches, and family gatherings". After the death of George Baden Crawley she remarried Rear-Admiral George Elliot Pringle, who also predeceased her. She died in 1913 at Ayot St Lawrence, Hertfordshire, leaving an estate valued at £76,528 gross.

== Death ==
On 25 September 1879, while disembarking from the steam ship City of Alexandria at Veracruz, Crawley was struck on the head by a heavy object that fell from a ship and died within three hours.

His body was returned to England and was buried on the west side of Highgate Cemetery.

== Gallery ==
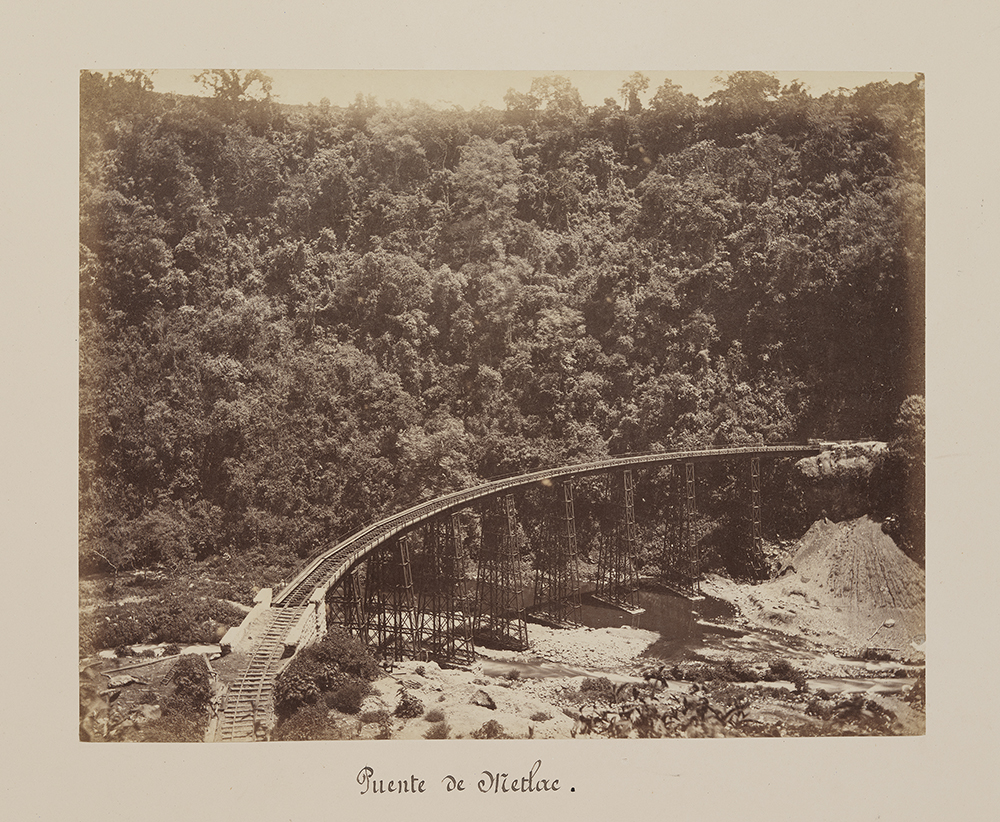
The Metlac Bridge on the Vera Cruz to Mexico City railway line

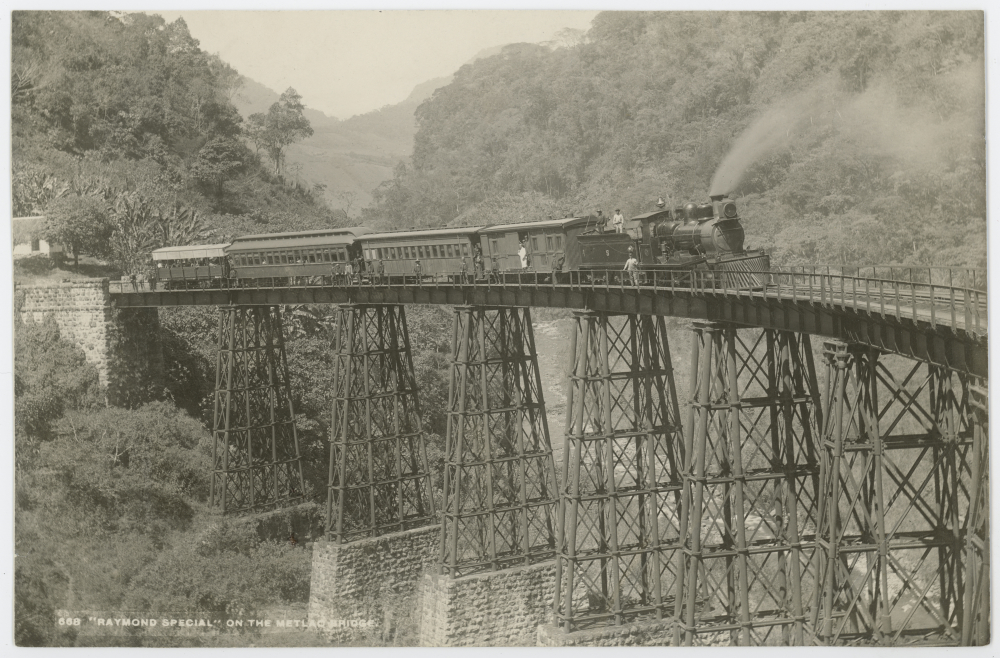
The 'Raymond Special' on the Metlac Bridge

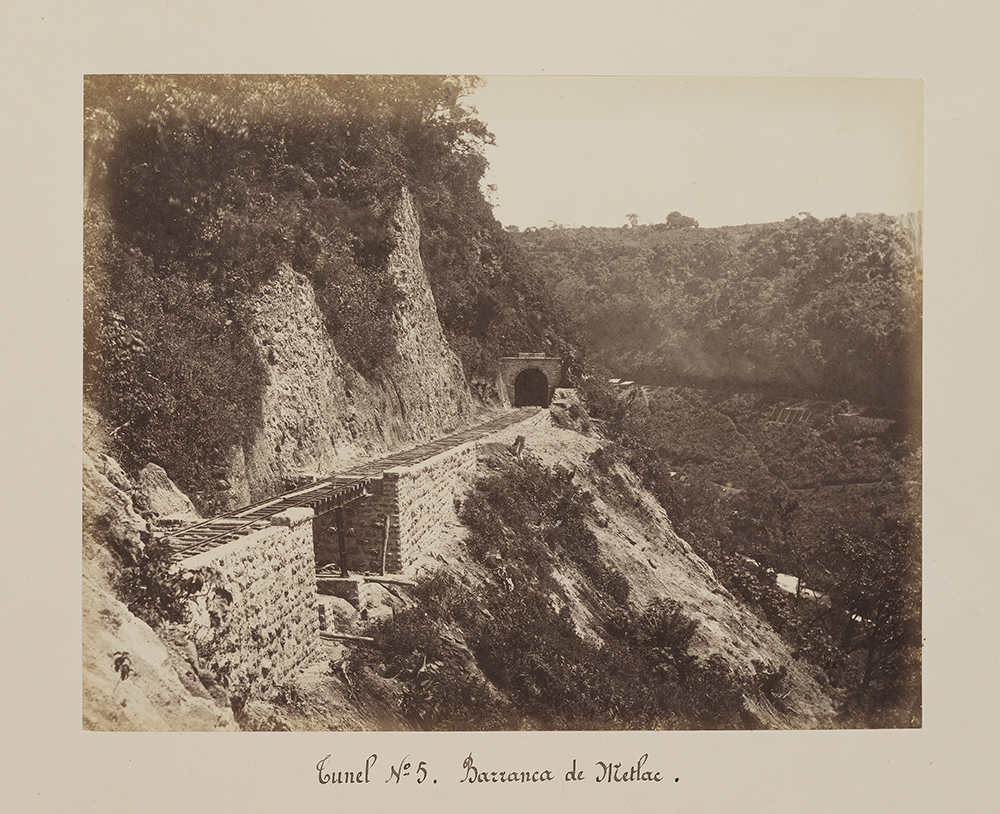
Tunnel No.5 on the Metlac Bridge approach

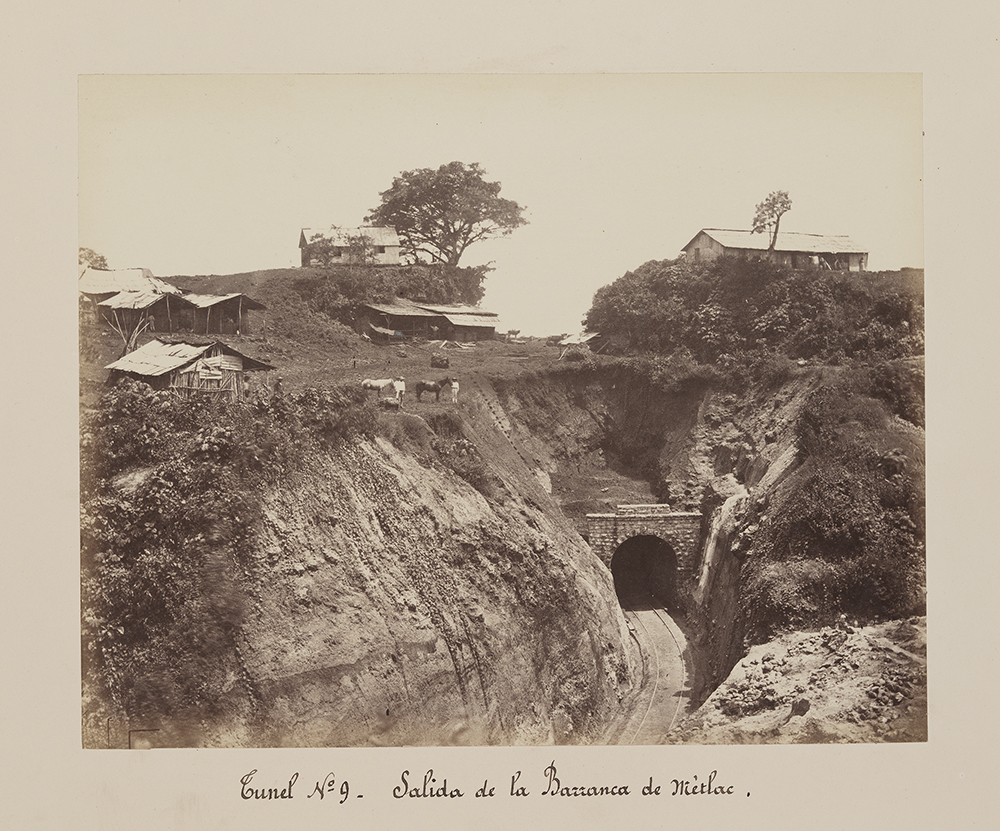
Tunnel no.9

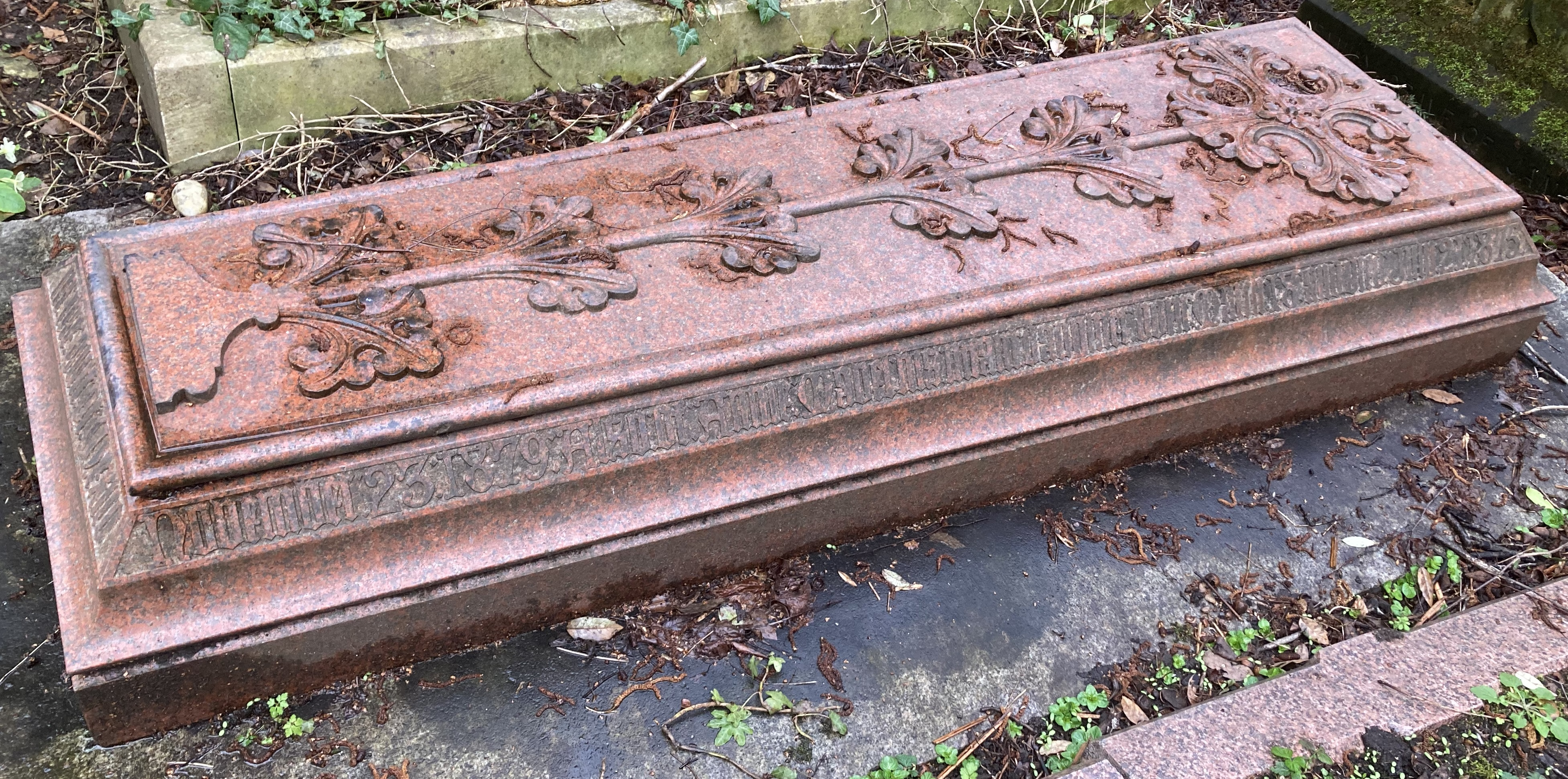
Grave of George Baden Crawley in Highgate Cemetery
