= William Crowhurst =

English cricketer

William Crowhurst (24 October 1849 – 4 July 1915) was an English cricketer. He was a right-arm fast bowler who played one first-class cricket match for Kent County Cricket Club in 1877.

Crowhurst was born at Chislehurst in Kent in 1849. He made his only first-class appearance for Kent against Nottinghamshire in June 1877 at Canterbury. He died in St Mary Cray in 1915 aged 65.

== Bibliography ==
- Carlaw, Derek (2020). Kent County Cricketers, A to Z: Part One (1806–1914) (PDF). Cardiff: ACS.
