= Minaret (novel) =

2005 novel by Leila Aboulela

First edition (publ. Bloomsbury)

Minaret is the second novel from the Sudanese author Leila Aboulela. Published in 2005, Minaret follows the journey of Najwa, a young woman forced to flee her home in Sudan in the face of the Second Sudanese Civil War. After her father's execution, she and her family are forced to flee to London and leave behind the life of affluence and comfort that she once knew. As she loses everything, she manages to find herself again through her faith.

== Characters ==
- Najwa, the protagonist of the novel. When she is first introduced she is 19 and a student at the University of Khartoum. Although she was enrolled in university, Najwa's aspirations never seemed to expand beyond getting married and having a family. Her family's affluence allows her a level of separation from the turmoil of her country, meaning that the military coup, that leads to the trial and execution of her father, catches her by surprise. Though she is a Muslim she is not very active in her faith. Things seem to fall apart for Najwa once in London with her brother's addiction and her mother's illness that leads to her eventual death. With her mother dead and brother in prison, Najwa has to adjust to her new life. She falls very easily into the comforting familiarity of Anwar. Through this, she meets women from her local mosque who reach out to her and support and encourage her renewed interest and dedication to Islam.
- Omar, Najwa's twin brother. It is hinted early in the novel that Omar is getting involved with some drugs while in Khartoum; however, it does not become a problem until they move to London. Omar becomes a drug addict, going so far as to steal from his mother and sister for drug money. However, while getting arrested for selling drugs he stabs and nearly kills a police officer, leading towards a 15-year prison sentence. Najwa visits him in prison often, trying to bring him some of the comfort and security that her new dedication to her faith has brought her, but Omar continuously rejects it.
- Anwar. Najwa first meets Anwar at university, where she very quickly starts to fall in love with him. Anwar is a radical communist who writes for the student newspaper and gives speeches on campus. It is because one of these speeches where Anwar verbally attacks Najwa's father, that the relationship between Anwar and Najwa ends. Najwa and Anwar find each other again in London after the death of Najwa's mother and a relationship begins to unfurl between them again. However, the relationship between Najwa and Anwar is very clearly unhealthy and emotionally abusive, where Anwar consistently puts Najwa down and looks down on her and her faith. Still Najwa stays with him and even spent money on buying him a computer and even giving him money for his PhD program. He goes so far as to say that he would never want to have children with Najwa because he does not want his children to share the same genes as Najwa's father. It is not until Najwa embraces Islam that she is able to leave him.
- Lamya, Najwa's employer. She hires Najwa to look after her daughter Mai and take care of the housework. Lamya is not a very religious woman, unlike her younger brother Tamer.
- Tamer, Lamya's younger brother. A 19-year-old university student who bonds with Najwa over their shared dedication to their faith. He is studying business, although he would rather be studying Islamic history. Najwa and Tamer fall in love, but things fall apart when Lamya catches Najwa and Tamer kissing. Although Tamer insists on them getting married, Najwa refuses him.
- Doctora Zeinab, the mother of Lamya and Tamer. In the end it is Doctora Zeinab that pays Najwa to stay away from Tamer.

== Plot ==
The novel of minaret is about broken into six sections that follow a non-linear narrative. The events of Najwa's past run parallel with the events of her life in the present day with the alternating sections

=== Part One: Khartoum, 1984–5 ===
The reader is introduced to Najwa and her family. Najwa lives a very privileged life, with her mother coming from a wealthy family and her father working as a high-ranking government official. She and her brother are both students at the University of Khartoum, which is where she first meets Anwar. When the coup occurs and their father is taken, Najwa and her family flee to London to await the news of his trial. Their father is found guilty and executed.

=== Part Two: London, 2003 ===
In this section the story jumps forward to the present day of the story on Najwa's first day of working for Lamya. It has been 18 years since Najwa had come to London and she is now a devout Muslim. The story walks through Najwa's routine of work, going to the Mosque, and visiting Omar. She is getting more comfortable in her job and she also properly meets Tamer and begins to get to know him.

=== Part Three: London, 1989–90 ===
Just after the death of her mother, Najwa is adjusting her new life alone and new freedoms of London. She begins working for her aunt, doing housework, and gets a letter from Anwar and agrees to meet with him. They talk and catch up and he persuades Najwa to help him with his articles for the newspaper he writes for and their relationship starts to build up again despite their constant disagreements. Najwa eventually loses her virginity to Anwar, something she feels immensely guilty over and further separates her from her faith.

=== Part Four: 2003–4 ===
Najwa and Tamer are getting closer thanks to their shared dedication to Islam. Their relationship is starting to shift towards a more romantic direction, and even though she faces criticism from her friend and her own internal reluctance about it, she doesn't stop the progression of their relationship. Things come to a head when Najwa has to work at a party that Lamya is throwing. Najwa gets emotional when she sees a dancer there mocking the hijab and her faith and so she seeks out Tamer for comfort. Tamer kisses her and Lamya finds them like this, prompting her to slap Najwa.

=== Part Five: 1991 ===
Najwa and Anwar's relationship continues its decline and Najwa finally reaches out to get more involved in Islam. She reaches out to a woman from the mosque to help her become a more devoted Muslim. She starts going to Mosque and finds solace and comfort in Islam and the teachings of the Qur'an. She ends her relationship with Anwar and starts wearing the hijab.

=== Part Six: 2004 ===
Najwa is now unemployed and trying to figure out her relationship with Tamer and where she wants to go from here. Tamer wants to move forward with the plan to get married, but Najwa doesn't want to hold him back or stunt his future. Doctora Zeinab comes to Najwa and offers her money to stay away from Tamer and Najwa accepts. Tamer is promised that he can study whatever he wants in university as long as he returns home and agrees to break things off with Najwa. They both agree to the terms and Najwa plans on using the money she got to go on Hajj.

== Themes ==
=== Class ===
In the beginning of the novel Najwa is living the life of an aristocrat. Her privileged life causes a disconnect between her and the political strife of her country. She doesn't think or care about politics because she doesn't have to. She doesn't focus on her studies because she doesn't plan on working, she just wants to get married and have children. Her lifestyle has to change drastically once she moves to London. A great deal of her father's money was confiscated by the new government in Khartoum, and the wealth she does have is lost very quickly to her brother's addiction, her mother's illness, and paying for Anwar's schooling. Najwa has to now work as a maid, but despite the fact that she has lost her money and cannot longer afford the lifestyle she used to have, she doesn't view herself as a member of the middle class and refers to herself as "upper class without money".

=== Religion ===
Islam plays a major role within the story. It's more than just a story of conversion, Najwa finds freedom and security when she fully embraces her faith. The mosque becomes a source of community for Najwa and a way for her to connect to her previous life in Khartoum. Her faith in Islam empowers her to stand up for herself and leave the toxic relationship she had with Anwar and the hijab becomes a symbol of strength and agency for her.
