= The Translator (Aboulela novel) =

1999 novel by Leila Aboulela

- First edition
- Author: Leila Aboulela
- Language: English
- Publisher: Grove Press Black Cat imprint
- Publication date: 1999
- Pages: 208

The Translator is Sudanese writer Leila Aboulela's first novel, published in 1999. It is a story about a young Muslim Sudanese widow living in Scotland without her son, and her blooming relationship with a secular Scottish Middle Eastern scholar. It focuses on issues of faith, cross-cultural romance, and the modernisation of Sudan.

== Plot ==
After losing her husband, Sammar, a young Sudanese widow living in Aberdeen, Scotland, struggles to cope. Desperate to go home to her family, she becomes increasingly depressed until she develops a closer friendship with Rae, the head of the department, where she works as an Arabic translator at the University of Aberdeen. The friendship soon progresses into a romance, but their love encounters cultural and religious barriers and the two have to compromise to make their relationship work.

The novel takes place both in Khartoum and Aberdeen and was inspired partially by Aboulela's own experience moving between these two cities. Aboulela refers to the novel and the main character Sammar as "a Muslim Jane Eyre".

== Reception ==
Author J. M. Coetzee called the book "a story of love and faith all the more moving for the restraint with which it is written".

In reference to the importance of faith in the story, Riffat Yusuf of The Muslim News has called The Translator "The first halal novel written in English".

Christine Thomas, writing for the Chicago Tribune, stated that the protagonist's melancholy stemming from the fact her husband is deceased are more significant to the character than religion. According to Thomas, the work's "most intriguing thematic flirtation" is that "continuity" instead of "originality" is "our most ambitious goal".
