= The Translator (Crawley novel) =

2023 novel by Harriet Crawley

- Author: Harriet Crawley
- Language: English
- Genre: spy thriller novel
- Published: 2023
- Publisher: Bitter Lemon Press
- Publication place: England
- Pages: 416
- ISBN: 9781913394806

The Translator is a 2023 spy thriller novel by British novelist Harriet Crawley. After a decades-long silence, the author delights with all her convincing in-detail knowledge of life in Russia.

In 2017, Clive Franklin, a British interpreter at the service of the Prime Minister, meets Marina Volina, an old-time Russian colleague. A romance full of suspense revolves along the neverending presence of the FSB, while Franklin devotes himself all the time to control whatever the other side hears. The Russian President plans to cripple the west by cutting internet cables, and the future of the West depends from Clive's and Marina's timely findings.
