= George A. Crawley =

British artist and designer (1864-1926)

George Abraham Crawley (1864–1926) was a British artist, designer and purveyor of English taste. His best known works include Crowhurst Place and Old Surrey Hall, both in Surrey, England, and the design of Westbury House (built 1904–10; additions constructed in 1915–16), at Old Westbury Gardens, in Long Island, New York, for John Shaffer Phipps (the heir to a steel fortune).

== Early life ==
George was the first son of George Baden Crawley (1833-1879) and Eliza Inez Hulbert (who died in 1913). His father was sportsman and railway contractor who planned and carried out two railways in Belgium, two railways in Spain, a railway from Vera Cruz to Mexico City, and a railway of nearly 300 miles from Tiflis to Poti in Georgia.

== Westbury House ==
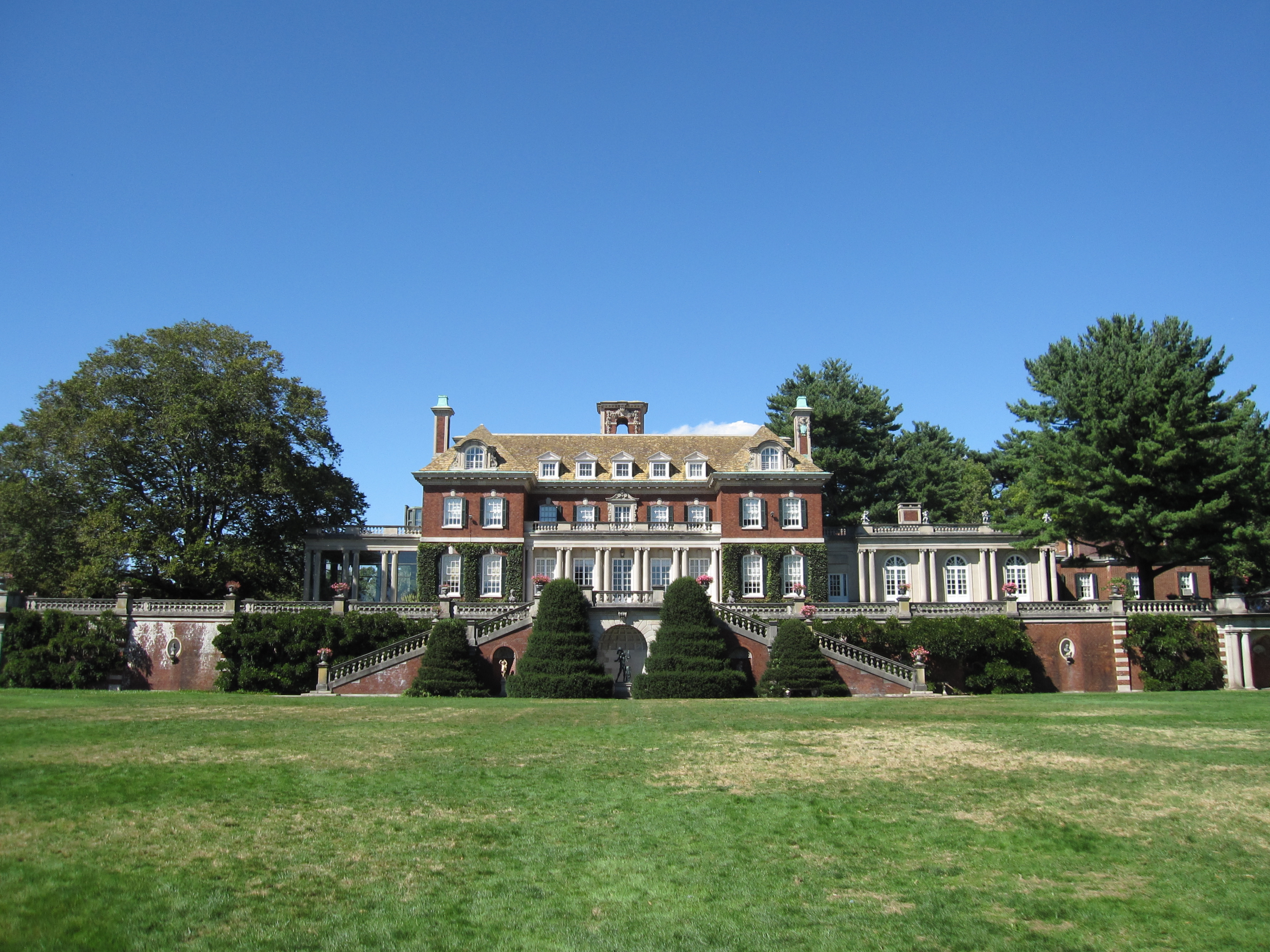
Westbury House in Old Westbury Gardens by George A. Crawley

George Crawley became acquainted with Henry Phipps in Scotland, where in 1903 Crawley was a house guest in the castle that Phipps rented during an extended visit. Phipps showed him the plans for the townhouse he was building on Fifth Avenue in Manhattan, telling Crawley about his dissatisfaction with the architects' work. Crawley took an interest in the project and made recommendations for a redesign, leading Phipps to invite him to New York City and ultimately to hire him to complete the design of the house.

Henry Phipps' son, John "Jay" Phipps, developed an appreciation for Crawley's design ideas while working with him on aspects of his father's Manhattan house, leading him to ask Crawley to undertake the design of a country estate house for the 175-acre (71 ha) tract on Long Island that he had purchased in 1901. Because Crawley was not formally trained as an architect, the Phipps family contracted with Grosvenor Atterbury to work with Crawley on technical aspects of designing the new home, which was named Westbury House (now Old Westbury Gardens). The collaboration of the two architects did not go smoothly, but the project was completed successfully. The overall plan of the home and the decorative details are credited to Crawley, while Atterbury provided scale drawings and construction plans. Crawley's design for the home included works by English artists with whom he was associated, including wood carvings by sculptor Francis Derwent Wood. Crawley played a major role in landscape design for the surrounding property, as well as additions and renovations that were made to the home after John Phipps and his family moved in.

== Other works ==
Crawley rebuilt Crowhurst Place in Surrey, firstly as a home for himself and subsequently for Consuelo Vanderbilt. He subsequently designed additions to Old Surrey Hall, a listed building in Dormansland, Surrey, England.

== Notes and references ==
Notes

References

- MacKay, Robert B.; Baker, Anthony K.; Traynor, Carol A., eds. (1997). Long Island country houses and their architects, 1860-1940. W. W. Norton & Company. ISBN 9780393038569.
