= Crowhurst Yew =

Tree in Crowhurst, Surrey, England

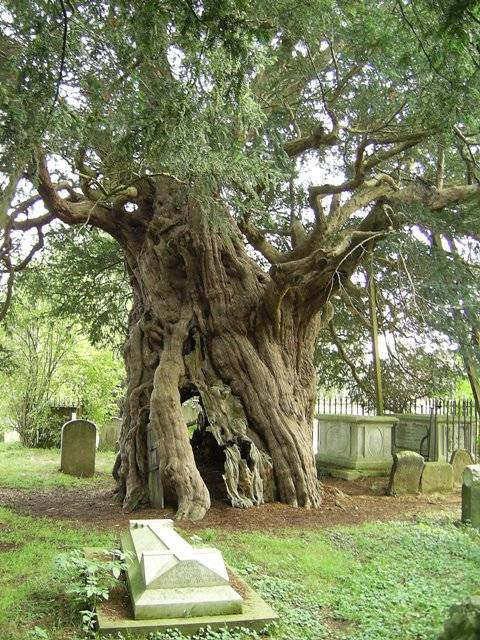
- Interactive map of Crowhurst Yew
- Species: English yew
- Location: Crowhurst, Surrey
- Coordinates: 51°12′33.8″N 0°00′37.8″W

The Crowhurst Yew is a yew tree in the churchyard of St George's Church in Crowhurst, Surrey, England.

It is thought to be about 4,000 years old. Its girth was measured in 1630 as 30 feet (9.1 m). It was mentioned by John Evelyn in 1664, and John Aubrey mentioned it in his Natural History and Antiquities of the County of Surrey, published in 1718–19.

It is a male tree, situated east-north-east of the church, and its girth was measured in 2013 as 32 feet 11 inches (10.03 m) at height 4 feet (1.2 m).

There is a hollow interior space, with a door about 4 feet (1.2 m) high. When the hollow space was created in 1820, a cannonball was discovered embedded in the side, probably from a nearby skirmish during the English Civil War. At one time the Parish Council met at the tree.

It was designated by the Tree Council as one of the 50 Great British Trees in the United Kingdom, to mark the Golden Jubilee of Elizabeth II in 2002.
