= Henry Crawley =

English cricketer

Personal information
- Born: 19 August 1865; Highgate, Middlesex
- Died: 18 August 1931 (aged 65); Walton-on-the-Hill, Surrey
- Source: Cricinfo, 28 April 2017

Henry Crawley (19 August 1865 – 18 June 1931) was an English cricketer. He played four first-class matches for Cambridge University Cricket Club between 1885 and 1887.

== See also ==
- List of Cambridge University Cricket Club players
