= Eustace Crawley =

English cricketer

Personal information
- Born: 19 April 1868; Highgate, Middlesex
- Died: 2 November 1914 (aged 46); Wytschaete, Hollebeke, Belgium
- Source: Cricinfo, 28 April 2017

Major Eustace Crawley (19 April 1868 – 2 November 1914) was an English officer in the British Army and cricketer.

Crawley was educated at Harrow School. He played seventeen first-class matches for Cambridge University Cricket Club between 1887 and 1889.

He commissioned into the British Army as a second lieutenant in the 12th Royal Lancers on 7 August 1889, was promoted to lieutenant on 7 January 1891 and to captain on 17 November 1897. The following year he served in operations in Sierra Leone, for which he received the Medal with Sierra Leone clasp. After the outbreak of the Second Boer War, he served with his regiment in South Africa, where he took part in the relief of Kimberley (February 1900), engagements near Johannesburg and the battle of Diamond Hill (June 1900). He was then stationed in Transvaal east of Pretoria (July to November 1900), and took part in the action at Wittebergen. For his service, he was mentioned in despatches, received the brevet rank of major on 29 November 1900, and the South Africa medal with four clasps. When the war ended in late 1902, Crawley went to Nigeria where he was seconded for service with the Northern Nigeria Regiment, and received the substantive rank of major on 9 December 1902.

Crawley served in Belgium during World War I, where he was killed by a shell.

== See also ==
- List of Cambridge University Cricket Club players
