= Edward Spencer Cowles =

American physician (1879–1954)

Edward Spencer Cowles (September 22, 1879 in Williamsburg, Virginia- November 16, 1954) was an American physician.

He married Florence Wolcott Jacquith and was the father of Virginia Cowles.

The Persian translation of his book Conquest of fatigue and fear won the Iranian Royal Book of the Year Award in 1957.

== Works ==
- Conquest of fatigue and fear
- Don't be afraid! How to get rid of fear and fatigue
- Psychopathology
- Religion and medicine in the church
