= Old Westbury Gardens =

Historic house in New York, United States

- U.S. National Register of Historic Places
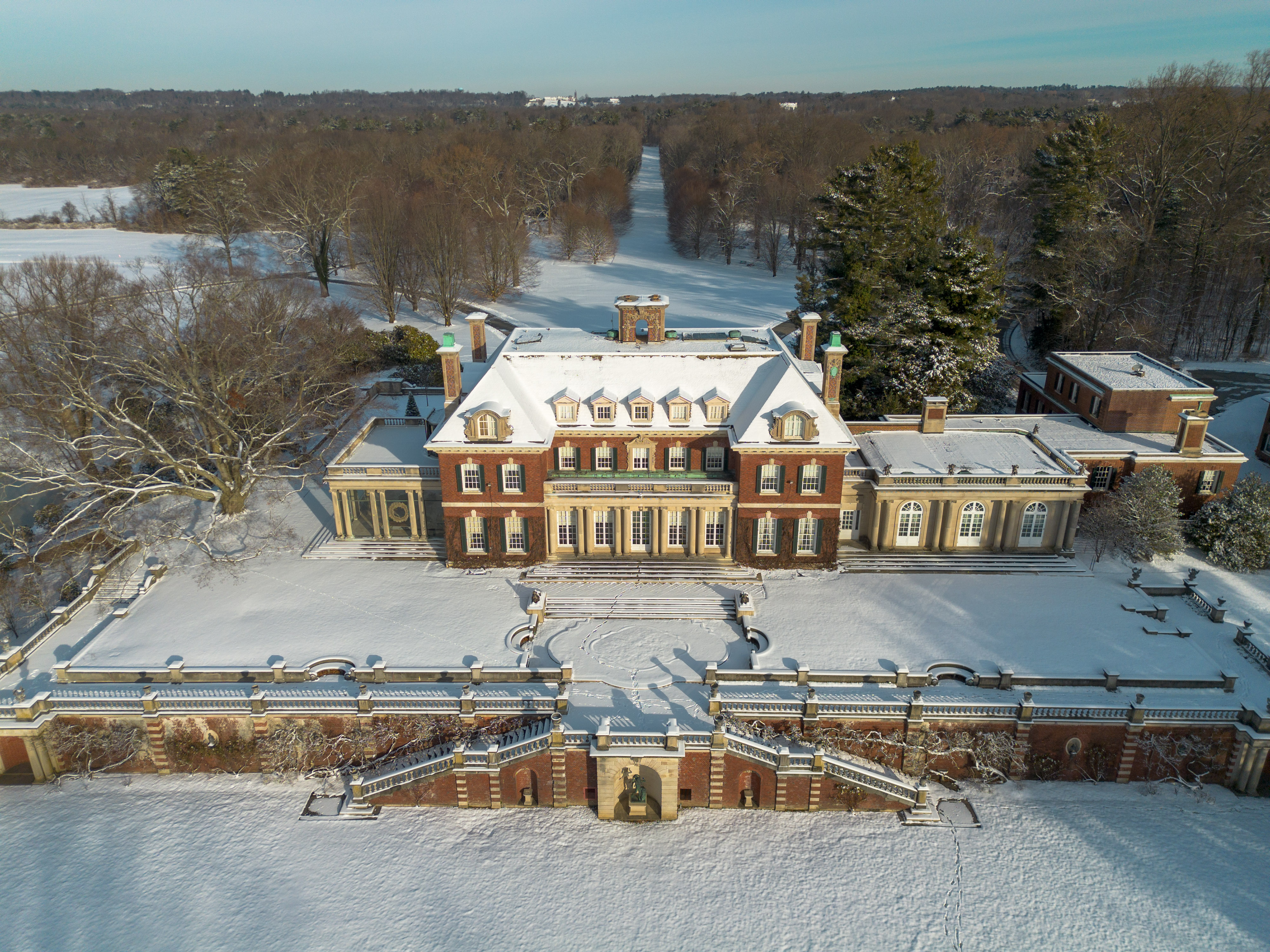
- Old Westbury Gardens Mansion in 2025

- Location within Long Island Location within New York Location within the United States
- Location: 71 Old Westbury Road; Westbury, New York
- Coordinates: 40°46′26″N 73°35′47″W
- Area: 100 acres (40 ha)
- Built: 1906
- Architect: George A. Crawley
- Architectural style: Carolean Revival
- NRHP reference No.: 76001234
- Added to NRHP: November 08, 1976

Old Westbury Gardens is the former estate of businessman John Shaffer Phipps (1874–1958), an heir to the Phipps family fortune, in Nassau County, New York. Located at 71 Old Westbury Road in Old Westbury, the property was converted into a museum home in 1959. It is open for tours from April through October.

It was listed on the National Register of Historic Places on November 8, 1976 and again on January 10, 2011.

== History ==
Work on the estate began in 1903, when John Shaffer Phipps promised his fiancée, Margarita Grace (a daughter of businessman Michael P. Grace), that he would build her a home in the United States that resembled her family's British residence at Battle Abbey in Battle, East Sussex, England. The house was ready in 1906 for Phipps, his wife and their young children.

Westbury House, the Carolean Revival (Charles II style) mansion designed by British designer George A. Crawley with assistance from American architect Grosvenor Atterbury, contains 23 rooms. The grounds cover 160 acres (0.65 km^{2}).

Adjoining Westbury House is also an enlarged farmhouse dating back to the mid-1860s. It is presently known as "Orchard Hill," and was given to Mrs. Peggie Phipps as a wedding gift in 1929. Old Westbury Gardens now owns the house and uses it for numerous purposes.

The painting of Mrs. Henry Phipps and Her Grandson Winston (1906–07) by John Singer Sargent hangs in the dining room. Winston Guest was the child, and his godfather was Winston Churchill.

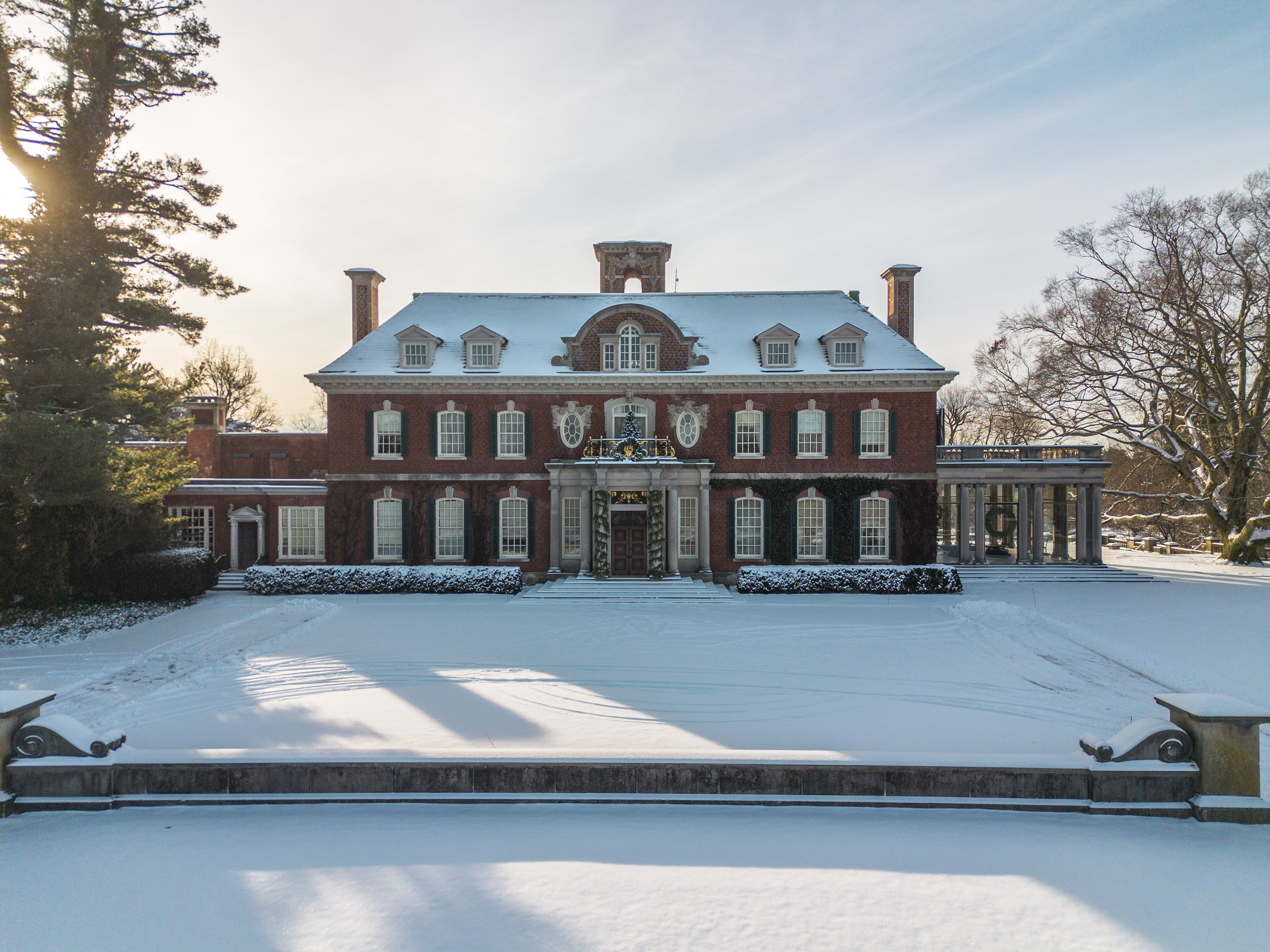
Front of the mansion in winter

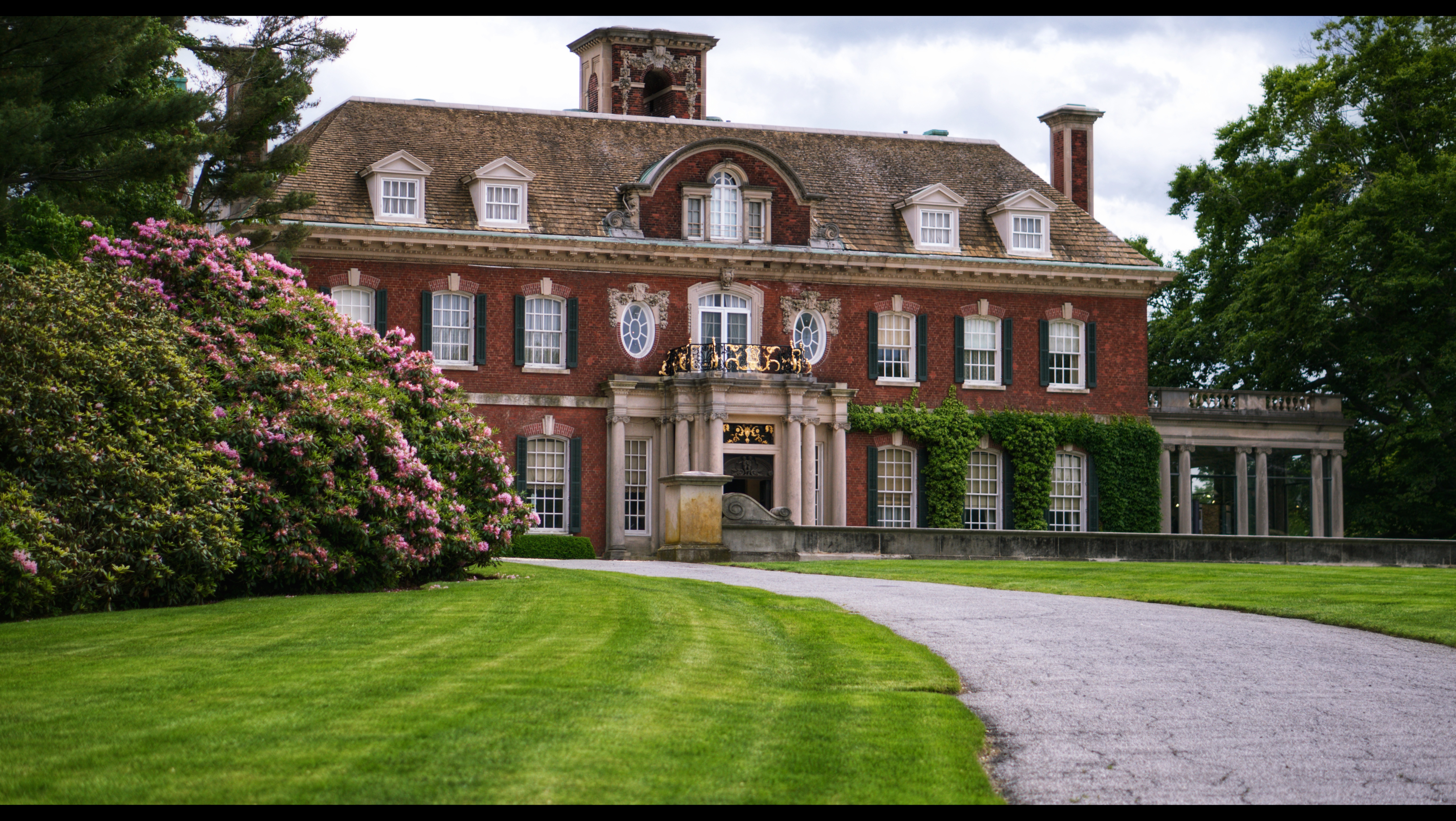
Front of the mansion in spring

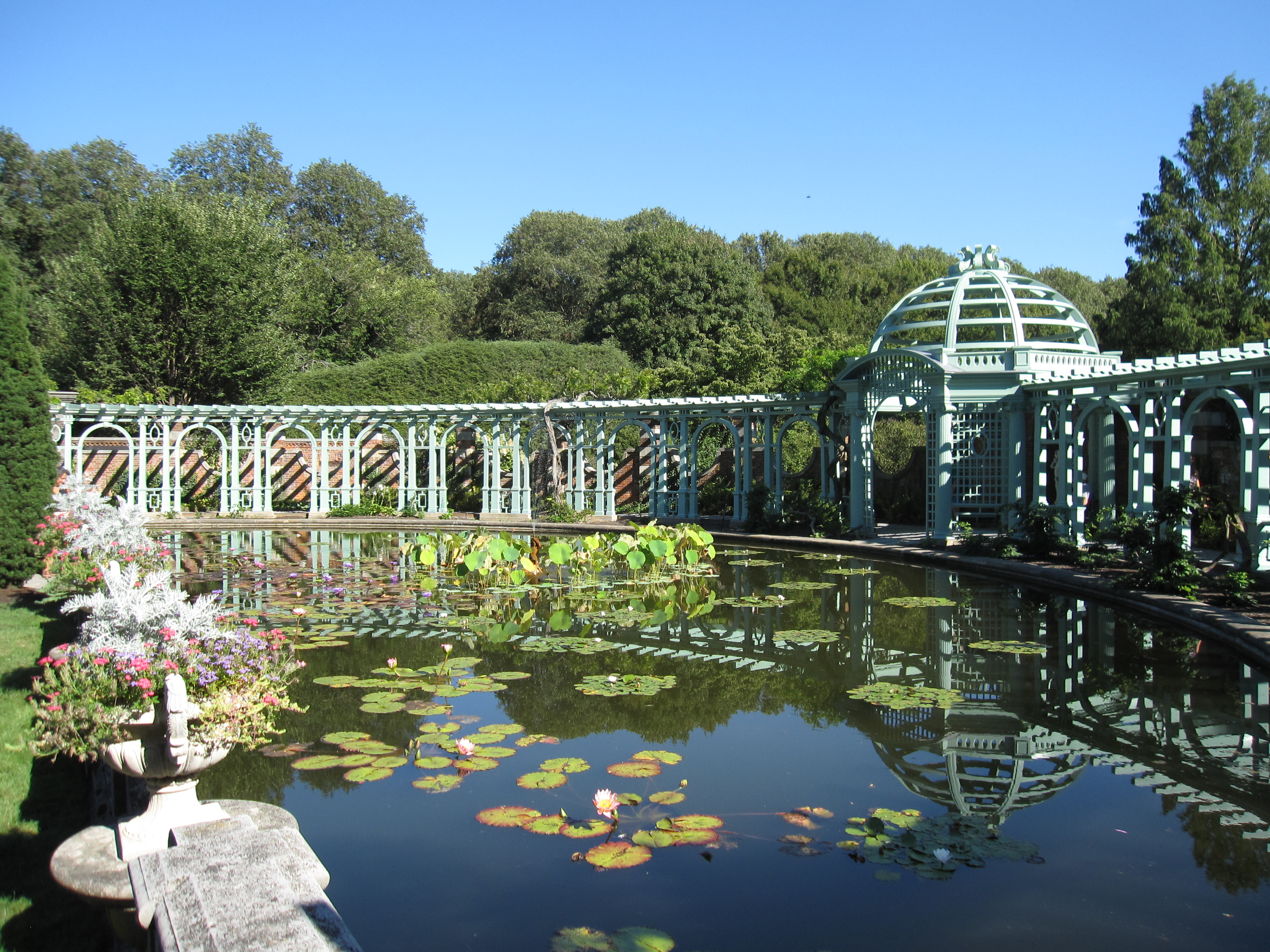
View of the walled garden

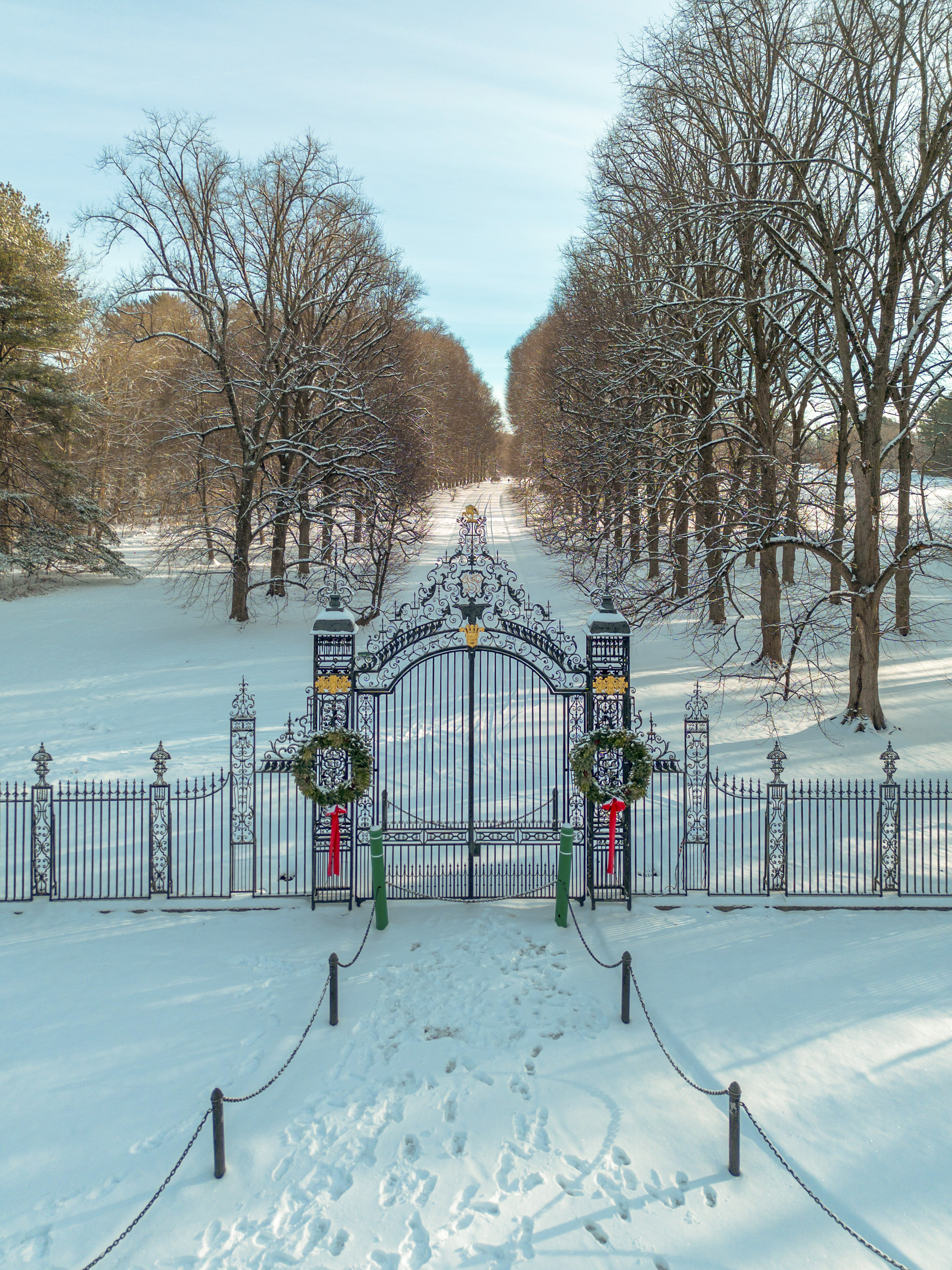
Entrance gates

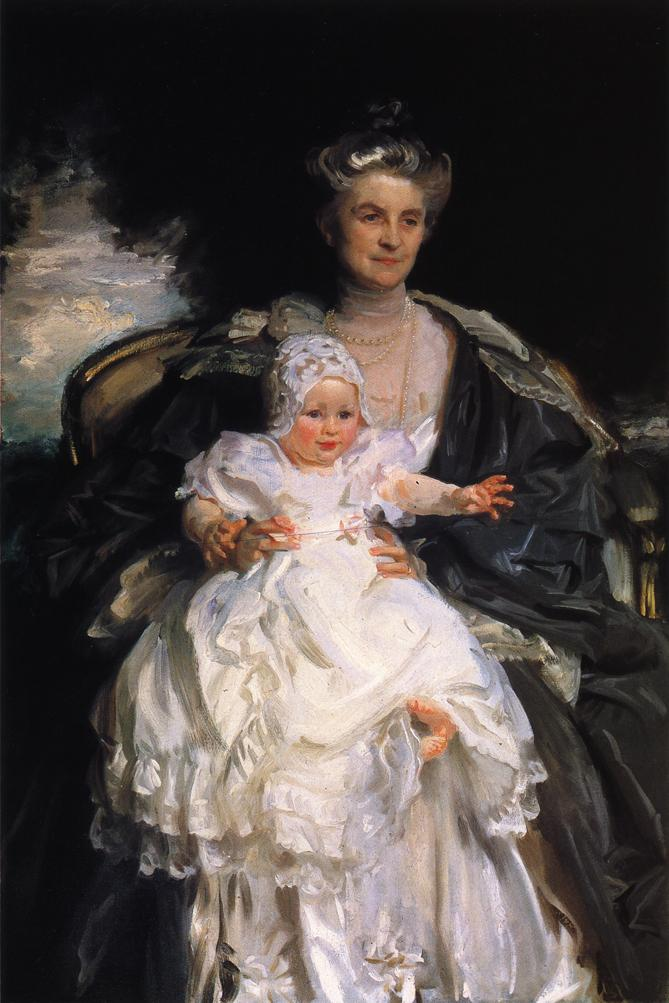
Mrs. Henry Phipps and Her Grandson Winston, by John Singer Sargent

== In popular culture ==
Scenes of the driveway and some of the ground floor interiors were used in the 1970 film Love Story, and its 1978 sequel, Oliver's Story, to depict the family home of Oliver Barrett IV, played by Ryan O'Neal. Other movies filmed on the grounds include North by Northwest (1959), The Age of Innocence (1993), Wolf (1994), To Wong Foo, Thanks for Everything! Julie Newmar (1995), Cruel Intentions and 8MM (both 1999), The Manchurian Candidate (2004), Hitch (2005), Kabhi Alvida Naa Kehna (2006), Bernard and Doris (2006), American Gangster (2007) and Arthur (2011). Scenes from the television series Pushing Daisies, Gossip Girl and Royal Pains also used the location in filming. It served as the inspiration for the Buchanan Estate featured in Baz Luhrmann's 2013 film adaption of The Great Gatsby by his wife and production designer Catherine Martin.

== Grant Recipient ==
In August 2024, a grant was released by The Preservation League of NYS to support the fund noteworthy restoration project of the garden.
