= Arthur Stafford Crawley =

Canon of Windsor (1876–1948)

Arthur Stafford Crawley MC (18 September 1876 – 8 October 1948) was a British cricketer and religious leader who was Canon of Windsor from 1934 to 1948.

== Family ==
He was born in 1876, the youngest son of George Baden Crawley (1833-1879) and Eliza Inez Hulbert.

He married Anstice Katherine Gibbs, daughter of Antony and Janet Gibbs of Tyntesfield, Somerset in 1903. They had five children.

== Army service ==
He volunteered as an army chaplain in 1915, and joined the Guards Division in Flanders commanded by his brother-in-law Rudolph Lambart, 10th Earl of Cavan. In 1916 he was awarded the Military Cross following the rescue under fire of wounded soldiers. A bar was later added to the MC.

== Career ==
He was educated at Harrow School and Magdalen College, Oxford. He played first-class cricket for Marylebone Cricket Club. He studied for the priesthood at Cuddesdon Theological College.

Following ordination he received the following appointments.

- Assistant curate at Stepney 1901 - 1903
- Assistant curate at Chelsea 1903 - 1905
- Vicar of Benenden, Kent 1905 - 1910
- Vicar of Bishopthorpe 1910 - 1918
- Vicar of East Meon, Hampshire 1922 – 1924
- Secretary to the York Diocesan board of finance 1924 – 1928
- Assistant secretary to the Church of England central board of finance 1928 – 1929
- Diocesan secretary to the St Albans Diocese 1929 – 1934
- Canon of St George's Chapel, Windsor Castle 1934 – 1948
- Chaplain to King George VI 1944 - 1948
