= Crawley (surname) =

Crawley is a surname. Notable people with the surname include:

- Aidan Crawley (1908–1993), British politician, journalist, and writer, related to the Crawley-Boevey baronets
- Annie Crawley (born 1968), American underwater photographer
- Ben Crawley (born 1971), American soccer player
- Bill Crawley, American history professor
- Charles Crawley (1908–1935), English cricketer
- Christine Crawley, Baroness Crawley (born 1950), British politician
- Cosmo Crawley (1904–1989), English cricketer
- David Crawley (bishop) (1937–2025), Canadian archbishop
- David Crawley (Gaelic footballer) (born 1977), Irish footballer
- Desmond Crawley (1917–1993), British diplomat
- Edward F. Crawley (born 1954), American professor
- F. R. Crawley (1911–1987), Canadian film producer
- Fiona Crawley (born 2002), American tennis player
- Geoffrey Crawley (1926–2010), British photographic expert and journalist
- George A. Crawley (1864–1926), British artist and designer
- George Baden Crawley (1833–1879), British railway constructor
- Ian Crawley (1962–2008), English footballer
- Ida Jolly Crawley (1867–1946), American painter
- Jacqueline Crawley, American neuroscientist
- Jim Crawley (born 1934), American football coach
- John Crawley (born 1971), English cricketer
- John Crawley (judge) (1940–2013), American jurist
- John Crawley (soccer) (born 1972), Australian football coach
- Judith Crawley (1914–1986), Canadian film producer
- Leonard Crawley (1903–1981), English sportsman and journalist
- Marita Crawley (born 1954), British songwriter and playwright, widowed daughter-in-law of Aidan Crawley
- Mark Crawley (born 1967), English cricketer
- Mick Crawley, British ecologist
- Mike Crawley, Canadian alternative energy CEO and former president of the Liberal Party of Canada
- Peter Crawley (boxer) (1799–1865), British bare-knuckle boxer
- Peter Crawley (headmaster) (born 1953), Australian headmaster
- Peter Crawley (cricketer), British cricketer
- Richard Crawley (1840–1893), Welsh writer, academic and insurance executive
- Samuel Crawley (1790–1852), English politician
- Stephen Crawley (born 1962), Scottish cricketer
- Sylvia Crawley (born 1972), American basketball player
- Tyrone Crawley (1958–2021), American professional boxer
- Verity Crawley (born 1994), English professional bowler
- William Crawley, Northern Irish journalist
- Zak Crawley (born 1998), English cricketer

== Fictional characters ==
- Crawley family in Vanity Fair, a novel (1847–1848) by William Makepeace Thackeray
- Con Crawley, character in the novel Florence Macarthy (1818) by Sydney, Lady Morgan
- Frank Crawley, a character in the classic novel Rebecca and its 1940 movie adaption, and 1979 and 1997 TV adaptions
- Bertrand Crawley, a Marvel Comics character associated with Moon Knight
  - Crawley (Marvel Cinematic Universe), the Marvel Cinematic Universe adaptation
- Crawley family, an aristocratic family whose lives are the subject of the television series Downton Abbey

== See also ==
- Crowley (surname)
