= Peter Crawley =

Peter Crawley may refer to:

- Peter Crawley (boxer), (1799–1865)
- Peter Crawley (headmaster), (born 1953)
- Peter Crawley (cricketer) (born 1969)

== See also ==
- Crawley (surname)
