= Bach to Baby =

Classical concert series for children

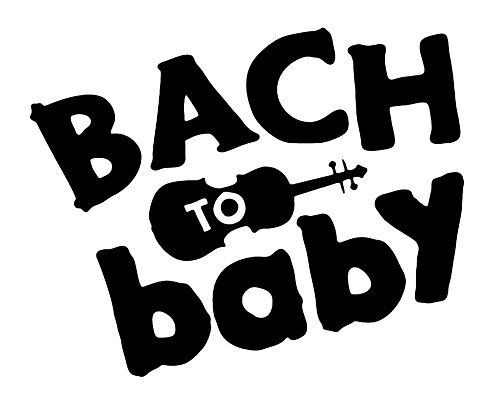
- Bach to Baby Logo
- Formation: February 1, 2011; 15 years ago
- Founder: Miaomiao Yu
- Founded at: London
- Type: Private
- Website: www.bachtobaby.com

Bach to Baby is a classical music concert series aimed at families with children under 5. It was founded in London, in 2011 by Miaomiao Yu, a classical concert pianist, and runs concerts across England. The series welcomes children of all ages, and imposes no behavioural expectations on the children.

The concert series has focused on presenting a wide repertoire with high artistic standards, which has led to performances at the Royal Albert Hall, Colston Hall, and collaborations with the Rambert Dance Company and the London Mozart Players. Recent performers have included Simon Wallfisch, Anne Denholm, Fenella Humphreys, Gabriella Swallow.

The series has brought classical music to audiences who previously might not have considered this genre to be relevant to them.

== Venues and activities ==
Bach to Baby presents a regular series of concerts in the Queen's Gallery, Buckingham Palace, which are usually programmed to support the current exhibition at the Gallery. The series has also been invited to present concerts in Windsor Castle as part of the Knights in Training Family Festival and were part of the Wedding Bells of Windsor celebrations to mark the royal weddings of 2018 that took place at the Castle.

In 2016, representatives from Bach to Baby participated in the Guildhall School of Music and Drama's Creative Entrepreneurs Programme run by Cause4.

Also in 2016, Bach to Baby formed a partnership with the London Mozart Players to present the UK's first orchestral concert for the 0+ age group.

Bach to Baby has worked with a number of museums and public spaces including the Foundling Museum, Burgh House and the Horniman Museum to present concerts and provide expertise in programming classical music events for children.
