= Williams Park =

Park in St. Petersburg, Florida, United States

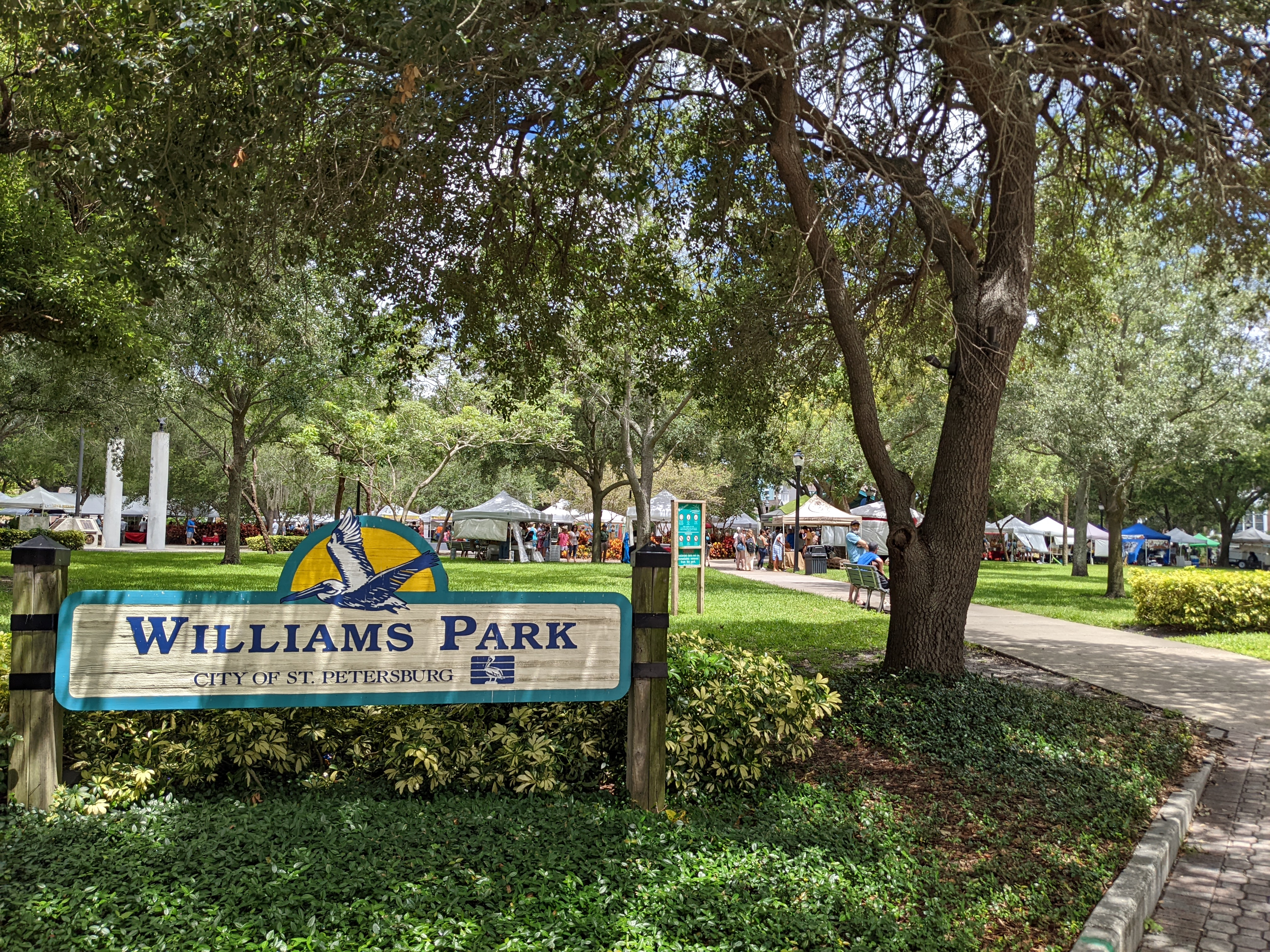
- Williams Park sign during Saturday morning market
- Interactive map of Williams Park

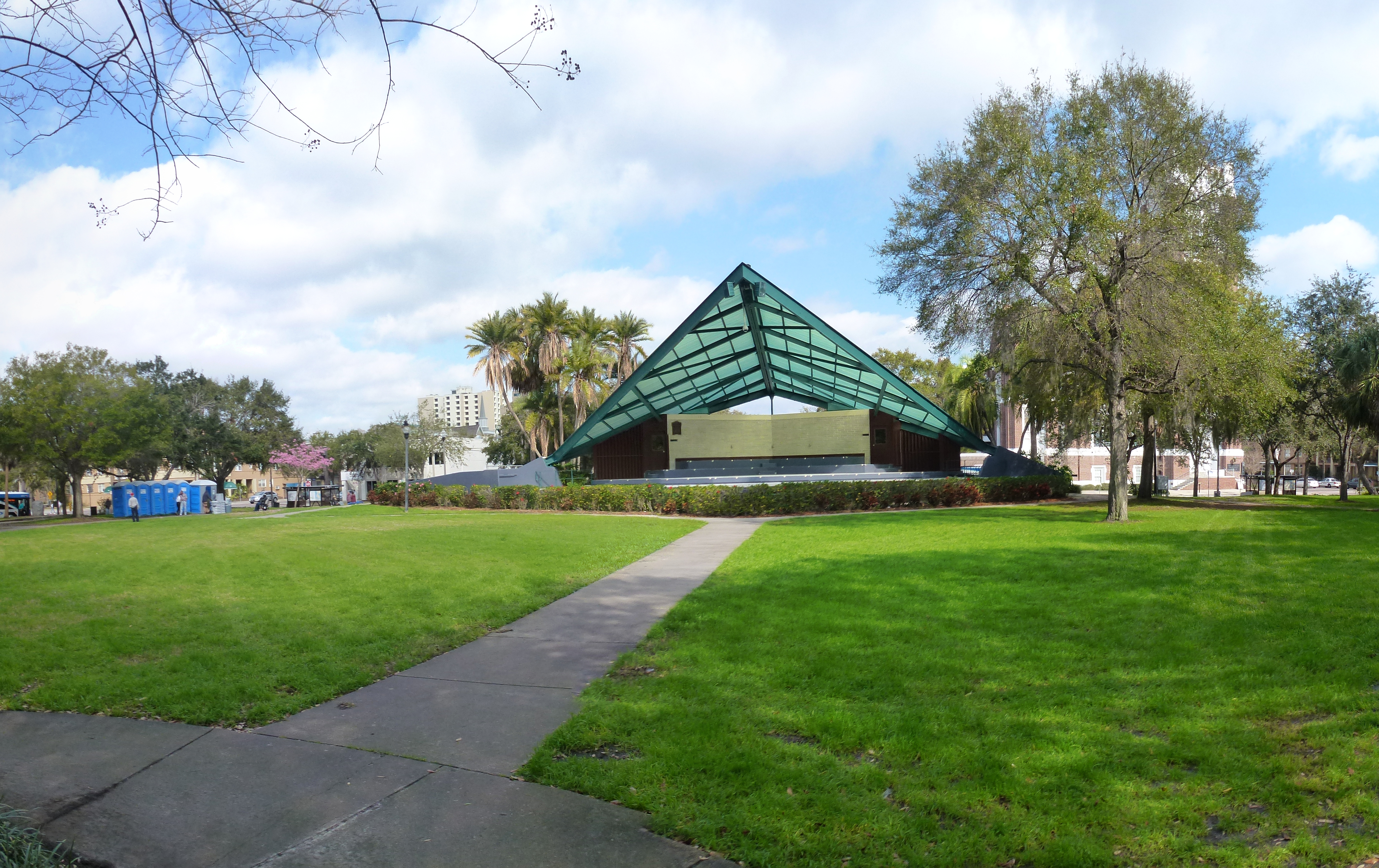
The bandstand designed by William B. Harvard

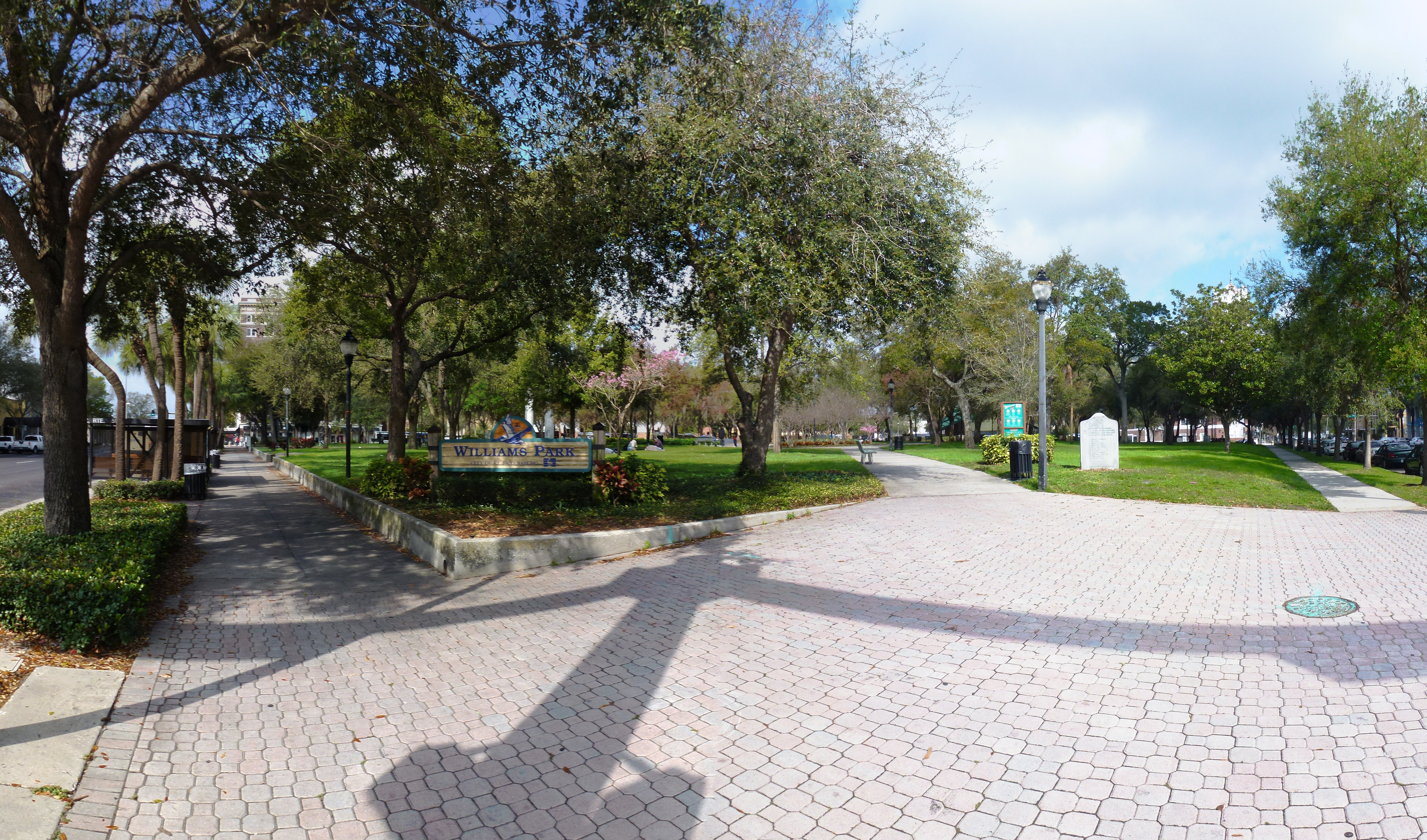
The Southeast corner of the park

Williams Park is a park located in St. Petersburg, Florida. It is the city's first park and encompasses an entire city block between 4th and 3rd Streets North and between 2nd and 1st Avenues North. Founded in 1888 and originally named "City Park," it was changed to Williams Park in honor of the co-founder of St. Petersburg, John Constantine Williams Sr.

The park is the center of the downtown business district and has been the venue for numerous political and civic rallies and celebrations for more than one hundred years. In 1964, Richard Nixon used the bandstand to speak to a large group gathered in the park on behalf of then presidential candidate Barry Goldwater. Many downtown workers flock to the park in good weather for picnics during their lunch breaks. At one time, the park was surrounded by prestigious department and retail stores. In the past 25 years, most of them have moved away to malls and other areas away from the city center.

The bandstand plays a prominent role in the park and one has been there since 1894. The modern bandstand in the park was designed in 1954 by St. Petersburg architect William B. Harvard, whose work also included the former inverted pyramid St. Petersburg Pier. In 1955 it was the recipient of the Award of Merit from the American Institute of Architects. It is used for outdoor concerts during the noon hour and on weekends, but for groups which tend to attract smaller crowds.

Williams Park has also been known as the city's homeless park, although less-so since the city relocated bus shelters in 2018. Local residents, college students and shoppers no longer stroll the sidewalks or lounge on the landscaped lawn. Ongoing drug sweeps and police activity are now the features that mar this once prominent gathering place.

It was state-of-the-art in 1954, when it was built. But in 2022, the Williams Park Bandshell is strictly old school. Parks and Recreation, through a study created by the Harvard Jolly architectural firm, will ask City Council to approve $1.5 million for bringing the Williams Park Bandshell into the modern age.

The St. Petersburg Downtown Partnership is exploring the idea to improve Williams Park.

“Williams Park has long been at the heart of downtown St. Petersburg, with a unique history that dates to the very planning of the city. The block-sized piece of land was donated by city founder John Williams, and it shows up on the first city plat in 1888… The city parks department, which is working to revitalize historic spaces for public use, hired Harvard Jolly Architecture firm – founded by William B. Harvard himself – to do a study of the structure in 2019. The findings revealed that the bandshell itself requires $780,000 in repairs, with $457,600 for the roof panels. Another $500,000 would aid in upgrading the stage with lights and a permanent sound system. This would include plans for collapsible staging platforms to give greater access for performances.

The Partnership is now proposing to create a foundation backed by private donations, much like the existing Waterfront Parks Foundation, to fund improvements to Williams Park and the First Block.

The Williams Park Foundation is working with the City of St. Petersburg, FL to redesign and activate the park. Read about Williams Park’s next chapter here.https://northeastjournal.org/wp-content/uploads/2026/03/NEJ-MarApr-2026-WEB.pdf
