= Gandon =

Gandon is a surname. Notable people with the surname include:

- James Gandon (1743–1823), English architect who worked in Ireland
- Jérémy Gandon (born 1996), French professional golf player
- Nick Gandon (1956–2025), English cricketer
- Pierre Gandon (1899–1990), French illustrator and engraver

Gandon may also refer to

- The municipality of Gandon in Senegal
- Russian and Armenian slang for a condom, scumbag, motherfucker, asshole, or dickhead
