= Crawley (disambiguation) =

Crawley is a town in West Sussex, England.

Crawley may also refer to:

== Places ==
In Australia:

- Crawley, Western Australia

In England:

- Crawley (ward), Luton, Bedfordshire
- Crawley, Hampshire
- Crawley, Oxfordshire
- Crawley Down, West Sussex
- Husborne Crawley, Bedfordshire
- North Crawley, Milton Keynes, Buckinghamshire

In the United States:

- Crawley, West Virginia

== Other uses ==
- Crawley (surname)
- Crawley (UK Parliament constituency)
- Crawley Town F.C., football club
- The Crawley family, a fictitious aristocratic family in the British TV period drama Downton Abbey

== See also ==
- Crowley (disambiguation)
