= St. Petersburg Pier =

Pleasure pier in Florida, United States

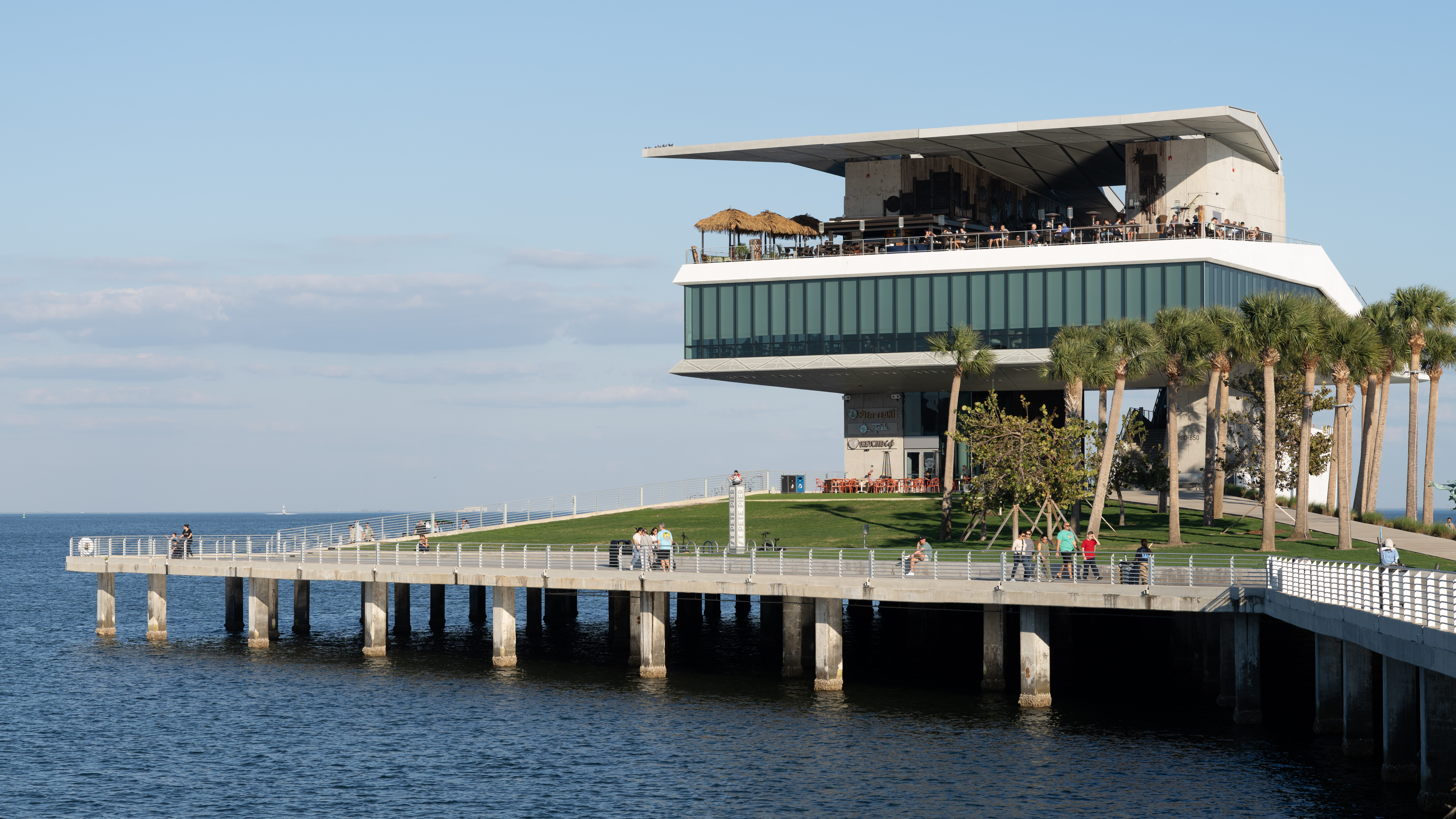
- East end of St. Petersburg Pier in 2025
- Type: Pleasure pier
- Spans: Tampa Bay
- Location: St. Petersburg, Florida
- Coordinates: 27°46′24″N 82°37′19″W
- Official name: St. Pete Pier
- Owner: St. Petersburg

History
- Designer: ASD Architects; Rogers Partners Architects+Urban Designers; Ken Smith
- Opening date: July 6, 2020

The St. Petersburg Pier, officially known as the St. Pete Pier, is a landmark pleasure pier extending into Tampa Bay from downtown St. Petersburg, Florida, United States.

Several structures have occupied the site. The current 26-acre Pier District opened on July 6, 2020. It includes five restaurants, a playground, an environmental education center, and artwork.

== History ==
=== Early constructed piers ===
Before the construction of a centralized pier in St. Petersburg, Florida, several smaller piers jutted out into the Tampa Bay from 1854 to the creation of the Railroad Pier in 1889. The first of which resulted from an expedition by Lt. C.H. Berryman replying to Florida senator David Levy Yulee to survey land for optimal partitions of railroad lines following the 1850 Florida Swamp Land Act to the region. Though due to the railroad being halted in Cedar Key, Florida the project was soon deserted, however the findings did stimulate active ideas in extending the line to the greater Tampa Bay metropolitan area due to his 1855 report.

The first centralized pier was created in 1889 when the Orange Belt Railway, brought by Peter Demens, constructed the Railroad Pier stretching from around 2,000 to 3,000 feet into the Tampa Bay after being convinced by John C. Williams. Built on 1st Avenue South, the Railroad Pier allowed for steamboats and cargo-freight ships to enter and dock in its 12-foot-deep waters. It was deemed by Demens to be a tourist attraction, later instigating the construction of a bathing pavilion in the two years following its opening. In the same year, Henry W. Hibbs leased part of the pier to open a fishing business which quickly grew the industry of fishing in the area.

During these early years, Demens sold off the railway to Henry B. Plant, who converted the railway into the Sanford and St. Petersburg Railroad. Not wanting to lose business interest in his holdings, Plant and his associates held a monopoly on the pier going as far as to block further dredging of the channel later in 1901. As an alternative to the Railroad Pier, D.F.S. Brantley constructed the Brantley Pier in 1896 at the length of 1,500 feet in 7-foot-deep waters. The Brantley Pier also hosted a bathing pavilion, and was built farther north at 2nd Avenue North. As competition between the piers grew, it helped to facilitate William Straub of the St. Petersburg Times to successfully advocate for the waterfronts to be used for public parks in the early 20th century.

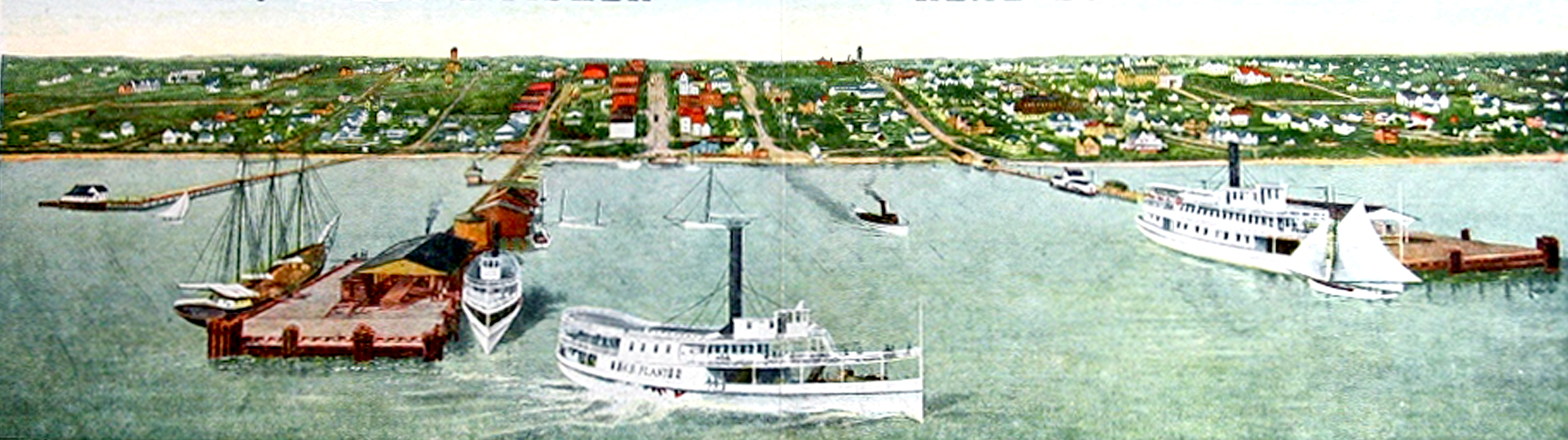
1906 postcard of the Fountain of Youth Pier (left), the Railroad Pier (center), and the Electric Pier (right)

A third pier was built by Edwin H. Tomlinson in 1901 south of the Railroad Pier on 4th Avenue South which was named the Fountain of Youth Pier. The pier featured a cottage at the edge of the pier and a well drilled near the entrance, with water that held similar promise to the famed Fountain of Youth.

The Brantley Pier was demolished in 1904 and was soon replaced by the Electric Pier constructed by F.A. Davis in 1905. The Electric Pier had a length of 3,000 feet and was 16 feet in width. The pier was illuminated with light bulbs and featured an electric trolley that could move both passengers and cargo down the length of the pier, rivaling that of the Railroad Pier once again. In 1908, Jesse F. Conrad purchased the pier from Tomlinson and added an arch for the entrance of the pier as well as turning the well into a spa.

The city of St. Petersburg built its first pier, the Municipal Recreation Pier, ten feet north of the Electric Pier in 1913 after voters authorized a $40,000 bond. The Municipal Recreation Pier was an effort by the city to boost its tourism, enhance the cities parks, and was used solely for recreational activities. A year later, in 1914, the Electric Pier was demolished.

In the aftermath of the 1921 Tampa Bay Hurricane, the Fountain of Youth Pier was destroyed, and the spa building at its base collapsed. The rest of the piers were severely damaged as the Railroad Pier had a water tank and Henry W. Hibbs fishing unit left standing while the Municipal Recreation Pier had only pilings remaining. Soon after that, the Municipal Recreation Pier was repaired, although engineers had alerted public officials that the pier would need to be replaced thereafter.

=== The Million Dollar Pier ===
Lew B. Brown, a publisher of the Evening Independent, promoted an effort to construct a new pier entitled "The Million Dollar Pier". Brown had organized the community into donating $300,000 towards the pier, with the remaining funds being bonded from the city. Voters in 1925 voted to endorse a $1 million bond towards a new pier structure, and construction of the pier began the same year. In total, the pier would cost $998,729.18 ($18.3 million in 2025 dollars).

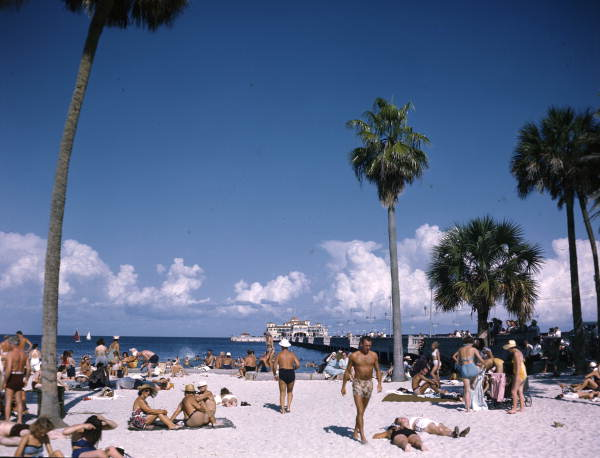
The Million Dollar Pier picture from Spa Beach in 1954

After a year of construction, the Million Dollar Pier was opened on November 25, 1926 with 10,000 individuals in attendance. The pier extended 1,452 feet into the bay with the bridge measuring 100 feet in width. At the head of the pier stood a building named the Casino, a Mediterranean Revival architecture structure. The Casino had hosted a central atrium for vehicles, an open air ballroom and theater, and an observation deck. Along its base and approach the pier also accommodated a beach, a solarium, and a streetcar line. In July 1927, the radio station WSUN began operation on the second floor of the Casino in the Shrine Club.

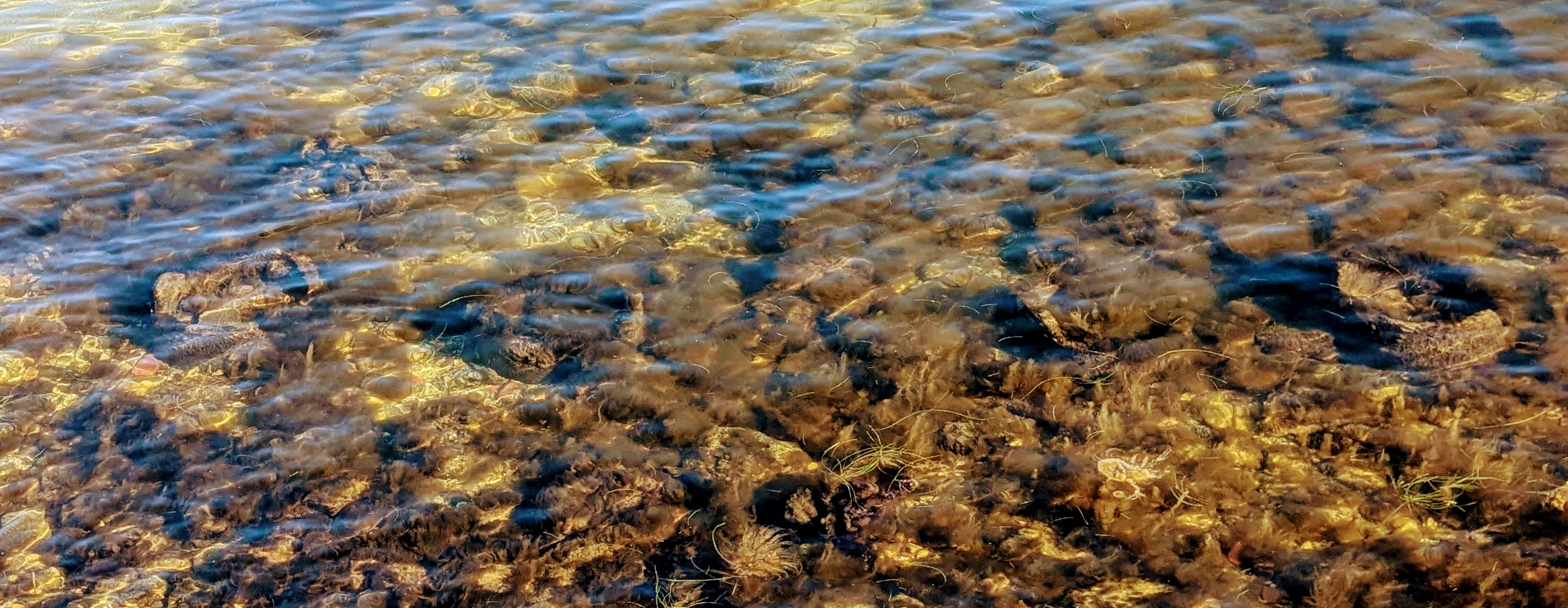
The piling foundations of the railroad pier seen underwater at Demens Landing Park in 2024

In 1952, the Railroad Pier was demolished ending the early era of public constructed piers.

In the mid 1960s, the pier became neglected, with several different groups suggesting ideas for replacements to the pier. The city council denied them. Due to considerable repairs and renovations that would be needed to upkeep the pier, the demolition of the Million Dollar Pier Casino structure started in July 1967 and was completed in the same year by the Cuyahoga Wrecking Company.

=== The Inverted Pyramid Pier ===
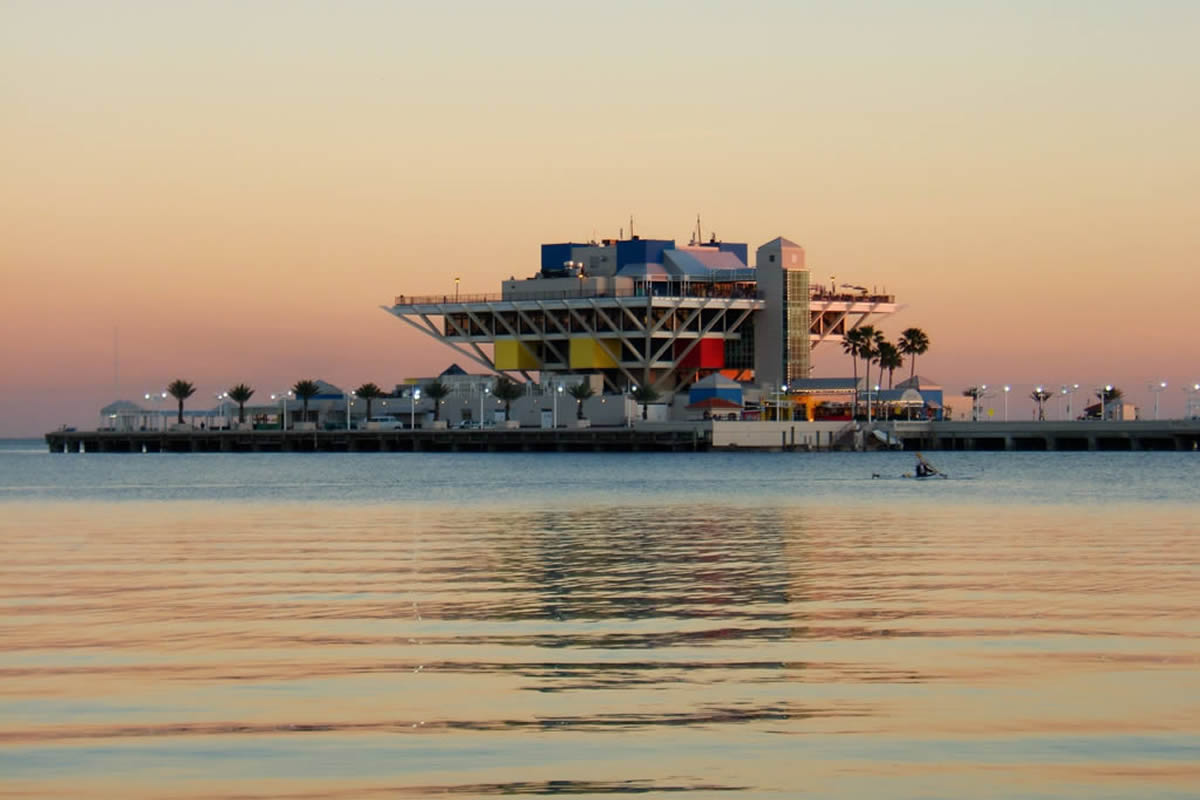
The Inverted Pyramid Pier in 2007 as viewed from the Vinoy Park

After the demolition, the pier's head was converted into a park that included benches, tables, and shelters. In the ensuing years, the city considered numerous alternatives, from industrial to commercial uses. In 1969, the city council authorized a pier project slated to be completed for the 1970–1971 tourist season at the cost of $2 million. The project selected was the Inverted Pyramid Pier designed by William B. Harvard Sr., with a minimal obstructed view of Tampa Bay. The following year in 1970, the pier project was granted an additional $800,000 to construct the design.

The Inverted Pyramid Pier opened on January 15, 1973 after delays and a budget of approximately $4 million. Upon its opening, the Marriott Corporation was contracted to manage the pier for five years. The pier had a tubular steel framework to create large windows for panoramic views of Tampa Bay and a larger top floor and observation deck.

On March 20, 1976, the city dedicated a laser sculpture by Rockne Krebs entitled Starboard Home on the Range, Part VI. The sculpture featured a green laser beam from the pier directed towards downtown St. Petersburg, reflecting to the pier several times with mirrors, and then reflecting out to Tampa Bay. When ongoing technical problems with cooling the laser engine caused repeated dysfunction, the laser sculpture was shut down.

In 1983, James W. Rouse of the Enterprise Development Company (EDC), a for-profit subsidiary of the non-profit Enterprise Foundation, began plans for redeveloping the Inverted Pyramid Pier into a $50 million festival marketplace that would feature a mix of local boutique shops, restaurants, and entertainment. This mall, known as the Pier Park Festival Market (also called St. Petersburg Festival Market) was designed by Philadelphia-based Wallace Roberts & Todd (WRT). The plan was rejected in 1984 by St. Petersburg voters due to concerns of the scale and cost.

The city fired the EDC as the developer and selected the Berenson Corporation for a smaller mall, which cost $12 million. The Inverted Pyramid Pier was closed in 1986 to begin renovations and construction of the new mall. After delays and an expanded restoration budget of $12 million, the pier reopened on August 27, 1988.

In 2004, the city of St. Petersburg determined The Pier's upkeep was excessive. In August 2010, the St. Petersburg City Council accepted Mayor Bill Foster's recommendation to demolish the current pier. The Inverted Pyramid Pier officially closed on May 31, 2013.

=== The Lens ===
In 2009, an official Pier Task Force initiated an international design competition with 29 design submissions. On January 20, 2012, the St. Petersburg Pier International Design Competition Jury unanimously selected Michael Maltzan Architecture's "The Lens" as the design for the new pier out of the original 29 architectural firms that submitted designs for the pier.

On August 27, 2013, city residents voted to cancel the contract with Michael Maltzan Architecture, ending The Lens project.

Although the old pier was demolished anyway, between August 2015 and late 2016.

== Current pier ==
Sixteen teams submitted ideas for a new pier, and in May 2015 the St. Petersburg City Council approved the "Pier Park" plans in a 7 to 1 vote.

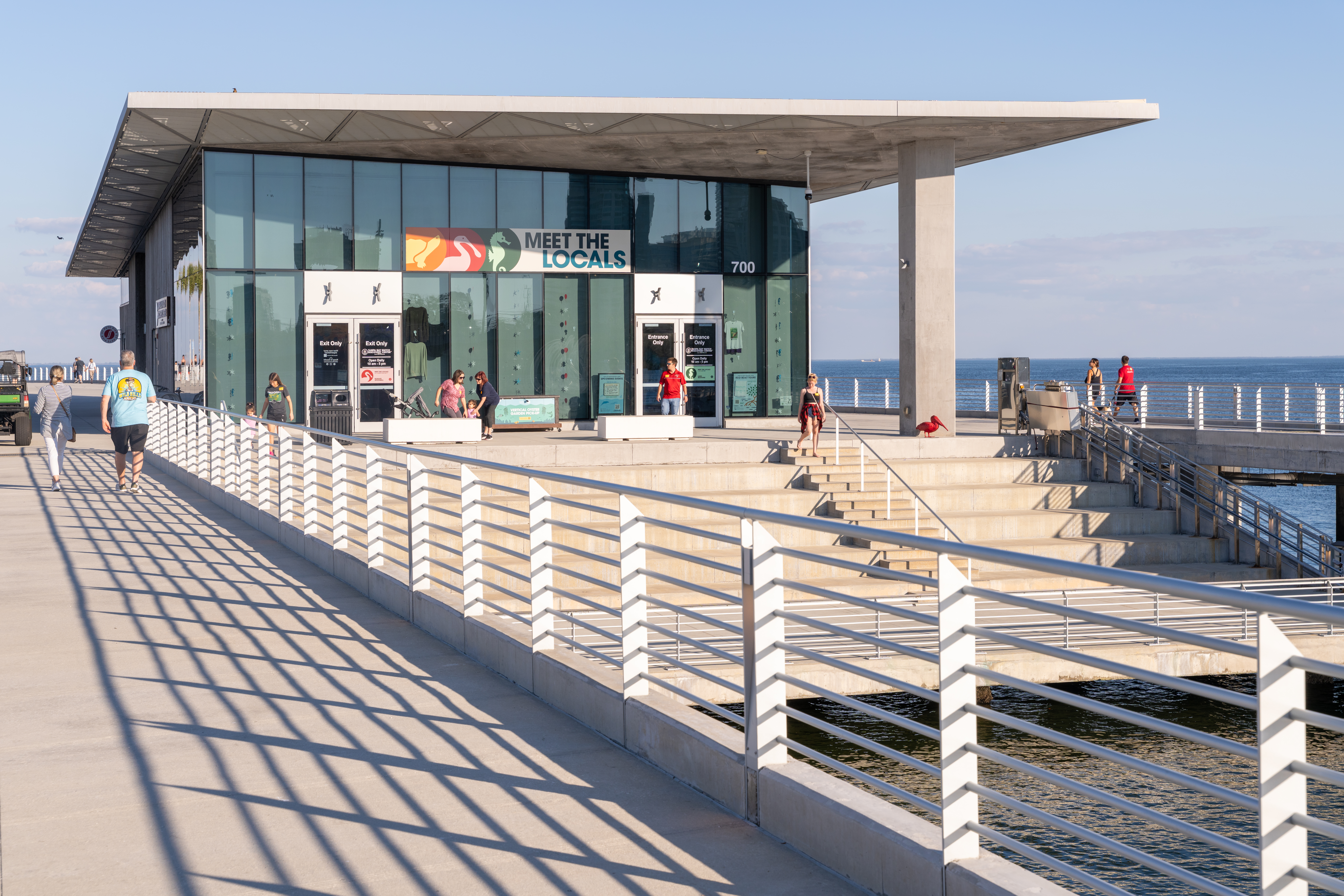
Tampa Bay Watch Discovery Center museum

Pier Park's groundbreaking began on June 28, 2017, and the pier and its district opened on July 6, 2020. The renovated St. Pete Pier cost $92 million, and includes five restaurants, a playground, an environmental education center, and numerous artworks including work by Xenobia Bailey, Nathan Mabry, Nick Ervinck, and a large sculpture entitled Bending Arc by Janet Echelman. The new addition to the city sits on 26 acres of land.

== In popular culture ==
On June 17, 1922, 18-year-old Dorothy MacLatchie was killed by a "monster fish" while floating next to the Municipal Recreation Pier in St. Petersburg, Florida. While some reports indicate a shark caused her death, newspaper accounts indicate her death was caused by a barracuda.

Numerous scenes from the second and third season of the mid-1990s television series seaQuest DSV featured the Pier. The Pier was featured prominently on the cover of local zombie anthology, Zombie St. Pete, a zombie-themed short story collection.
