= Ida Jolly Crawley =

American artist

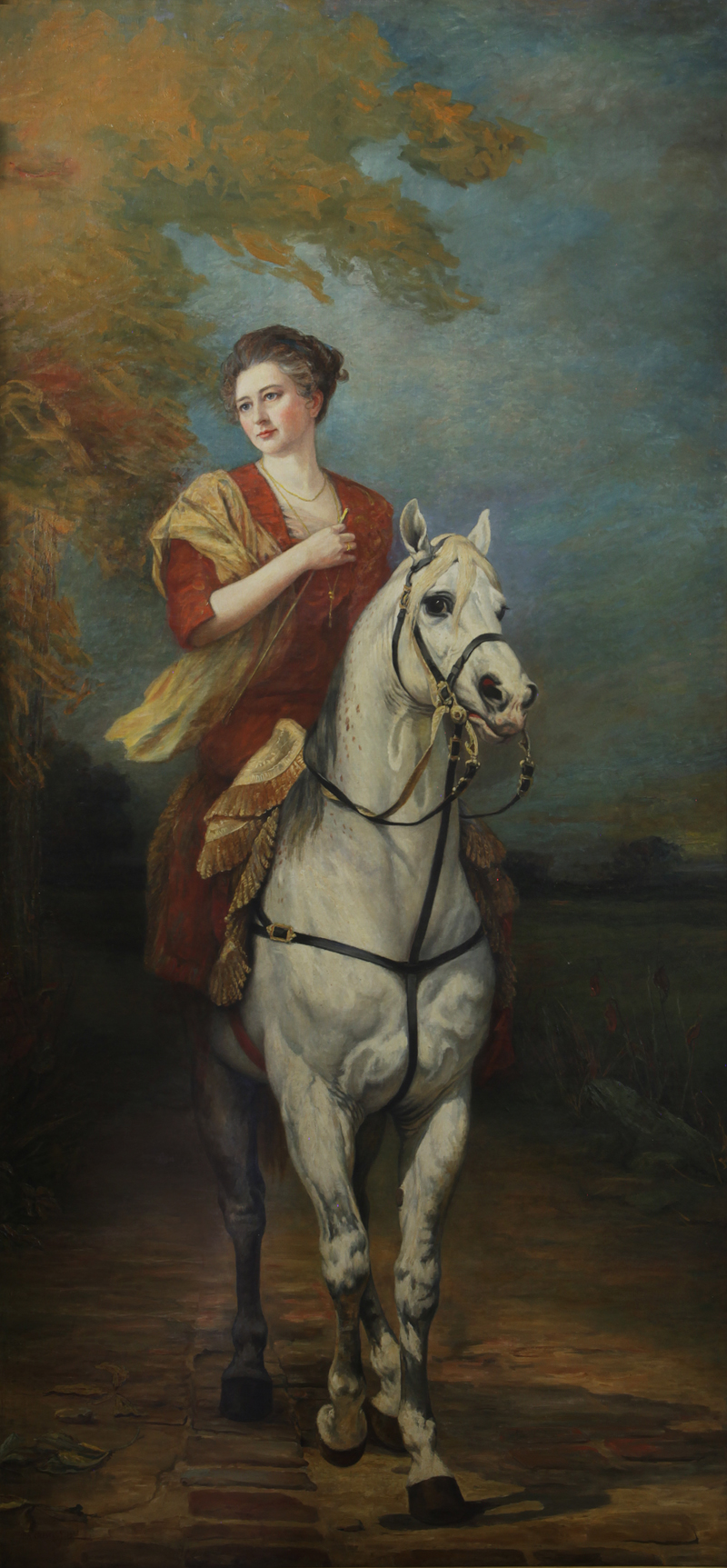
- Self portrait of Ida Crawley in 1913
- Born: November 15, 1867; Loudon County, Tennessee
- Died: April 15, 1946 (aged 78); Asheville, North Carolina
- Occupation: Artist

Ida Jolly Crawley (November 15, 1867 - April 15, 1946) was an American painter who founded a museum in Asheville, North Carolina and was its curator. Several of her paintings were exhibited in the Appalachian Expositions between 1910 and 1911. Five of Crowley's landscape oil paintings are held within the Johnson Collection in Spartanburg, South Carolina. In 1919 she founded the Ida Jolly Crawley Museum of Art and Archaeology, also known as the "House of Pan", after buying the Demens-Rumbough-Crawley House.

== Early life ==
She was born on November 15, 1867. She studied for five years at the Corcoran School of the Arts and Design in Washington, D.C. and in Germany and Paris for six years.

== House of Pan ==
Crawley founded the Ida Jolly Crawley Museum of Art and Archaeology, or the "House of Pan," in 1919 after buying the Demens-Rumbough-Crawley House. The Victorian style mansion was built in the early 1890s by Russian sawmill operator Peter Demens in Asheville's Chicken Hill neighborhood. She filled 16 of the 25 rooms with original oil paintings, rare antiques and relics.

In 1935, the American Association of Museums elected the Crawley Museum to their membership. Howard Hanger bought the property in 1973 and refurbished the mansion into a cooperative housing organization. Known locally as "Hanger Hall", it was listed on the National Register of Historic Places on April 14, 1982.

A sign over a mantel in the museum read, "Welcome to the House of Pan. Muse o’er its trophies, its owner, its art. From Dove-Tower to Crypt, a spirit you’ll find, a personality of heart."

== Death and legacy ==
Ida Crawley died inside her house museum on April 15, 1946, from a fall. She is credited with opening Asheville's first art museum. In 2015, Howard Hanger commissioned Jack Bailey to carve a statue of Pan out of a tree stump that had sat on the museum property for 200 years in honor of Ida Crawley.

== Gallery ==
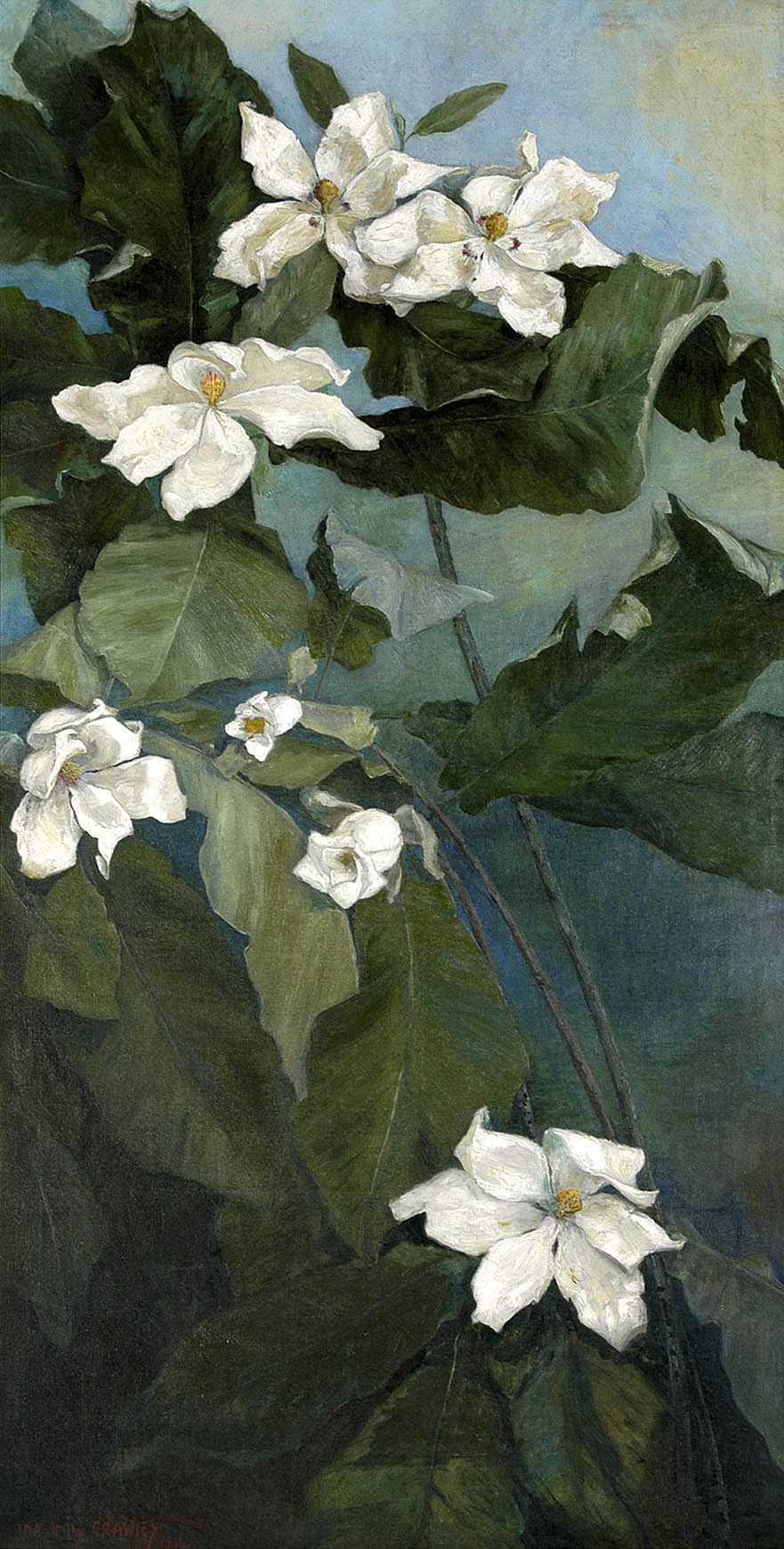
Magnolia Macrophylla by Ida Crawley, 1916

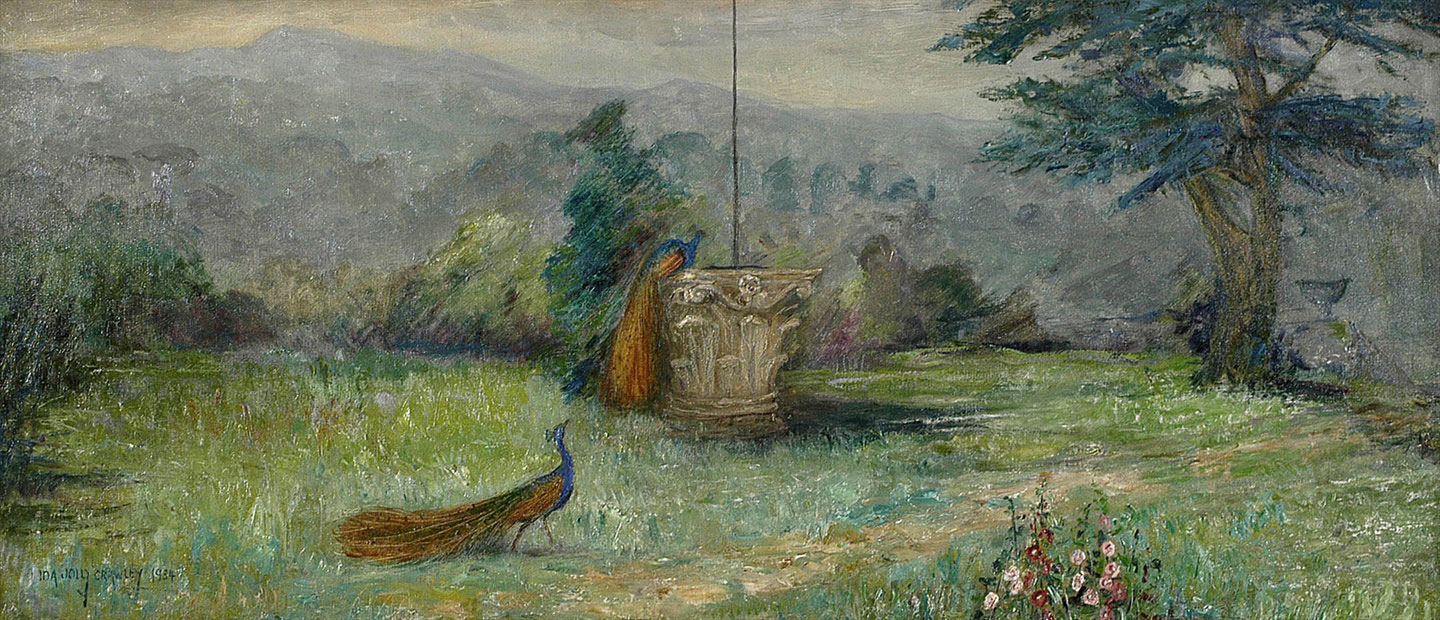
'Home Place' by Ida Jolly Crawley, 1934

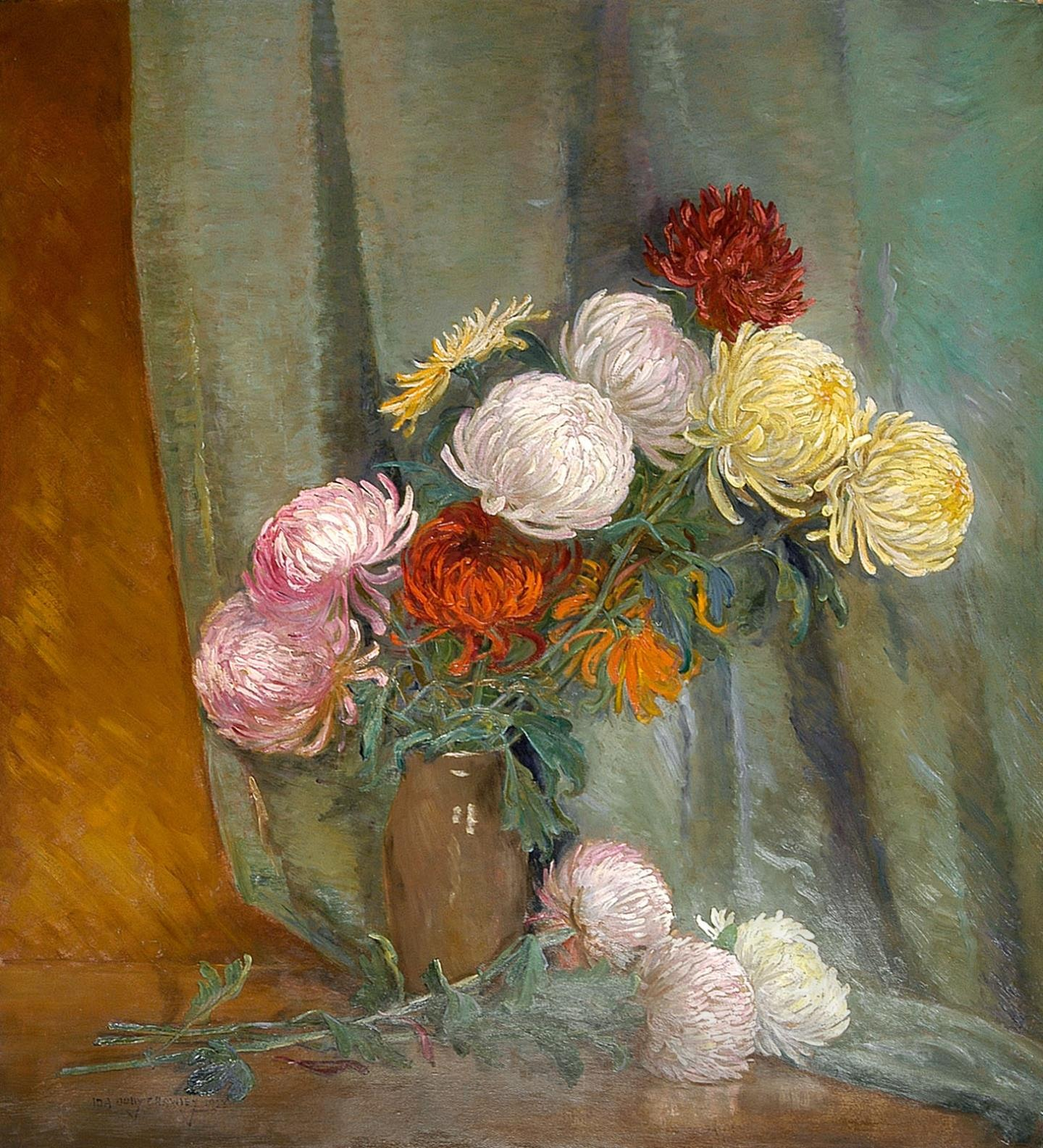
'Still life of Chrysanthemums' by Ida Crawley, 1928

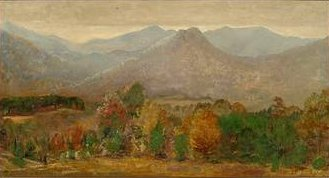
'Asheville, North Carolina Mountains' by Ida Crawley

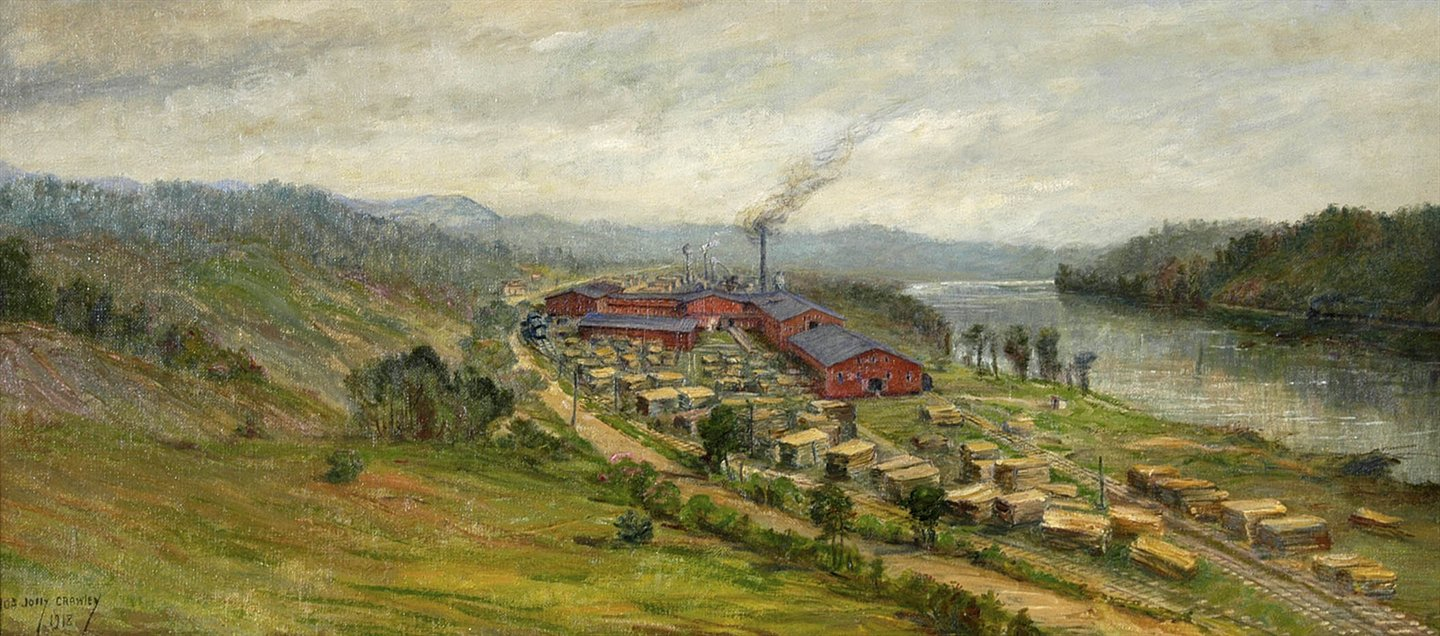
'Morgan Manufacturing Company, Woodfin, North Carolina' by Ida Crawley
