= Thomas Hughes-Hallett =

British barrister, financier and philanthropist (born 1954)

Sir Thomas Hughes-Hallett DL
- Born: Thomas Michael Sydney Hughes-Hallett; 28 August 1954 (age 72)
- Education: Eton College; University of Oxford; The College of Law
- Occupations: Barrister, investment banker, philanthropy executive
- Spouse(s): Jules, Lady Hughes-Hallett
- Children: 3

Sir Thomas Michael Sydney Hughes-Hallett DL (born 28 August 1954) is a British barrister, investment banker and philanthropy executive. He serves as the Non-Executive Chair of the Marshall Institute at the London School of Economics and the Chelsea and Westminster Hospital NHS Foundation Trust. He promotes philanthropy, and argues for more ethical engagement within the City of London.

== Early life ==
Thomas Michael Sydney Hughes-Hallett was born on 28 August 1954.

He was educated at Eton College, a public school in Berkshire, England. He then went on to read history at the University of Oxford. In an interview, he said he had taught mathematics, music and hockey in Zimbabwe at the age of twenty-one. He then received a law degree from The College of Law.

== Career ==
Hughes-Hallett first trained as a barrister, but quit soon thereafter as he felt the job was "lonely". In another interview, he stated that his image of being a barrister was shattered when his first case was an eleven-week incest trial. After facing a retrial that would take another eleven weeks, Hughes-Hallett is quoted as saying that "I just couldn't face going through that again so I left." He subsequently worked as an investment banker for Schroders for five years.

In the late 1980s, he founded an investment bank, Enskilda Securities, earning him the nickname "Thomas Huge-Wallet". For the next eighteen years, he was the Chief Executive of Enskilda Corporate and later the Chairman of Robert Fleming Securities. A major shareholder in Flemings, he retired from finance shortly after its merger with Chase in 2000.

== Philanthropy ==
Hughes-Hallett became first involved in charities during the 1990s, during which he was first a trustee and later the Chairman of the Michael Palin Centre for Stammering, as well as Chairman of the English Churches Housing Group.

In 1999, Hughes-Hallett suffered an apparent heart attack, which he hinted was the result of a stressful life style in his capacity as an investment executive. This health scare caused him to re-evaluate his priorities in life.

In 2000, he left investment banking to do charity work instead. From 2000 to 2012, he served as the Chairman of the Marie Curie Cancer Care Trust. To raise his salary of £90,000, in 2002 he cycled across Vietnam for the Marie Curie Cancer Care to be able to keep him. According to a report, he seeks to cover his salary cost through similar fund-raising challenges every year.

Hughes-Hallett serves or has served in leading positions of various charitable organisations. He served as the Executive Chair of the Institute of Global Health Innovation at Imperial College London. Additionally, he served as the Chairman of the End of Life Care Implementation Advisory Board and as Chair of the Palliative Care Funding Review. Furthermore, he is a member of the board of trustees of the Esmée Fairbairn Foundation. He is the Chairman of the Chelsea and Westminster Hospital NHS Foundation Trust. He also serves on the board of trustees of the King's Fund.

In 2013, he became Chairman of Cause4, an organisation that assists charities in their fundraising.

=== Views on banking and charity ===
Hughes-Hallett has called for more bankers and investors from the City of London to be involved in philanthropy and to donate not only time and talent, but also money. In a 2002 interview, Hughes-Hallett expressed his surprise when he realised that the people who can afford to donate money usually do not.

Speaking at the Close Brothers Trustee Leadership Programme, a seminar organised by Close Brothers Asset Management, an investment firm based in the City of London, in 2014, he argued that serving on the Board of Trustees of a philanthropic organisation was valuable work experience for serving on a corporate board.

In the past, he has expressed the sentiment that his own generation of bankers was far too concerned about making money, but that he believes the younger generation has realised the importance of philanthropy. He also expressed hopes that the younger generation of bankers in the City is more generous that his own.

Hughes-Hallett has expressed doubts regarding the utility of "social investments", considered sometimes as a sustainable alternative to philanthropy. Specifically, he criticised how social investments are portrayed as a charitable activity, but can often lead to unethical practices, especially in the health sector.

=== Call for NHS reform ===
In 2013, he called for a reform of the National Health Service, arguing that people's expectation of the NHS to provide all health services for free is setting it up for a breakdown. He called for making greater use of British society in health care.

=== Marshall Institute ===
In 2015, Hughes-Hallet together with investment banker Sir Paul Marshall established the Marshall Institute for Philanthropy and Social Entrepreneurship at the London School of Economics, supported by a £30 million investment by Paul Marshall. The institute's student body is expected to consist of people who have "reached the age of 50, a partner in an international firm, who've decided they've made their money and want to put something back."

== Accolades ==
He was knighted by Queen Elizabeth II for services to palliative care in her 2012 Birthday Honours. As a result, he is styled Sir Thomas Hughes-Hallett.

In 2013, he was the recipient of the Beacon Fellowship from the UK Community Foundations.

Anglia Ruskin University awarded Hughes-Hallett an Honorary Doctor of Arts degree in 2015.

== Personal life ==
He is married to Jules, Lady Hughes-Hallett, whom he met immediately after leaving Oxford and who is a former fashion editor of Vogue.

She is the Chair of Smart Works, a non-profit organisation which gives free clothes and job interview advice to women who are unemployed. The couple have four children: documentary filmmaker Grace Hughes-Hallett and two sons (Archie and Arthur), and a daughter who died in infancy, Emily.
