= Gary Yates =

Gary Yates may refer to:

- Gary Yates (cricketer) (born 1967), English cricketer
- Gary Yates (director), Canadian film director
