= Chelsea and Westminster Hospital NHS Foundation Trust =

Healthcare trust in England

- Type: NHS foundation trust
- Established: 1 October 2006
- Hospitals: Chelsea and Westminster Hospital; West Middlesex University Hospital
- Chair: Thomas Hughes-Hallett
- Chief executive: Lesley Watts
- Website: www.chelwest.nhs.uk

Chelsea and Westminster Hospital NHS Foundation Trust operates Chelsea and Westminster Hospital and West Middlesex University Hospital (since 1 September 2015). The Foundation Trust was created on 1 October 2006. The Trust's chief executive is Lesley Watts and its chairman is Sir Thomas Hughes-Hallett.

The Trust also manages a number of highly specialised sexual health clinics at 56 Dean Street and Dean Street Express in Soho, 10 Hammersmith Broadway (formerly West London Centre for Sexual Health at Charing Cross Hospital) and John Hunter Clinic at St Stephen's Centre.

Brian Eno has volunteered to help transform the casualty department. He is to refine the A&E’s acoustics. He is one of several artists backing a £600,000 appeal by Chelsea and Westminster Health Charity to provide visual and aural features. Appeal patron Hugh Grant, who lives near the hospital, said: "The charity is working with artists and designers to do clever and cunning things with lighting, with sound and with the design."

As of 2018, the trust employs 6,339 staff.

== Performance ==
The Care Quality Commission inspection in July 2014 found the Trust "requires improvement". In children’s services only 200 whole time equivalent nursing staff were in post out of a budgeted 247. In the neonatal intensive care unit there was a 26% vacancy rate and staff claimed that a culture of bullying existed. One of the areas of outstanding practice noted within the trust was neonatal palliative care nursing, which had developed national standards.

It was named by the Health Service Journal as one of the top hundred NHS trusts to work for in 2015. At that time it had 3086 full time equivalent staff and a sickness absence rate of 2.89%. 77% of staff recommend it as a place for treatment and 69% recommended it as a place to work.

At the end of March 2017, the trust was confirmed as one of four additional NHS Global Digital Exemplars; joining the twelve announced in September 2016. The trust shares its GDE status with Imperial College Healthcare NHS Trust as a "joint Exemplar".

The most recent Care Quality Commission inspections in 2018 rated both Chelsea and Westminster Hospital and West Middlesex Hospital as 'Good', with C&W rated as 'Outstanding' for caring. This was an improvement over its previous rating of 'requires improvement. It was the only trust in London to meet the 4 hour target in its A&E departments in the second quarter of 2018/9, a target considered more challenging for a multi-site trust.

== See also ==
- List of NHS trusts
