= Harvard Jolly =

American architectural firm

Harvard Jolly is a St. Petersburg, Florida based architectural firm known for its work on school, healthcare and public buildings. It was founded as a solo practice in 1938 by William B. Harvard Sr. With the addition of Blanchard E. Jolly as partner, the firm became Harvard Jolly in 1961. In the 1970s Enrique M. Marcet, R. John Clees, John Toppe, and William B. Harvard Jr. joined the firm, which became known as Harvard Jolly Clees Toppe Architecture for some time. Harvard Jolly has offices in St. Petersburg, West Palm Beach, Tampa, Sarasota, Jacksonville, Tallahassee, Orlando, and Ft. Myers.

In 2012, Harvard Jolly was chosen along with Ikon 5 Architects of Princeton, New Jersey to design St. Petersburg College's College of Business building. In 2013 the firm was chosen to design a 111,000 square foot $60 million police headquarters building in St. Petersburg, Florida.

In 2023, Harvard Jolly announced a partnership with Texas based architectural firm, PBK Architects. This merger meant that Harvard Jolly would operate under the Harvard Jolly | PBK name until April 2025, at which point all Harvard Jolly operations would transition to the PBK name.

== William B. Harvard Sr. ==
William B. Harvard Sr. was born in Waldo, Florida. After graduating from Sewanee Military Academy, he attended the University of Cincinnati in the mid-1930s. He returned to Florida after his father's death during the Great Depression, originally apprenticing in Miami. Harvard then set up his own practice after a commission brought him to St. Petersburg, Florida. Harvard is known for his modern architecture designs including the St. Petersburg Pier, bandshell in Williams Park, Hospitality House at Busch Gardens, and Pasadena Community Church.

== Recent works by Harvard Jolly ==
- Sarasota High School (Redesign & renovations)
- Fivay High School, Hudson, Florida
- Booker High School, Sarasota, Florida
- Lemon Bay High School, Englewood, Florida
- Charlotte High School, Punta Gorda, (Renovation and reconstruction after Hurricane Charley)
- Charlotte Harbor Events and Conference Center, Punta Gorda
- Punta Gorda Middle School
- Addition to the St. Petersburg Museum of Fine Arts
- Sunken Gardens (Additions & renovations)
- Albert Whitted Airport Terminal
- Morton Plant Hospital—Morgan Heart Hospital (2007) Clearwater, Florida
- East Cooper Regional Medical Center Replacement Hospital (2009) Mt. Pleasant, South Carolina 2009
- North Fulton Regional Hospital (2007) Roswell, Georgia 2007

== Early works ==
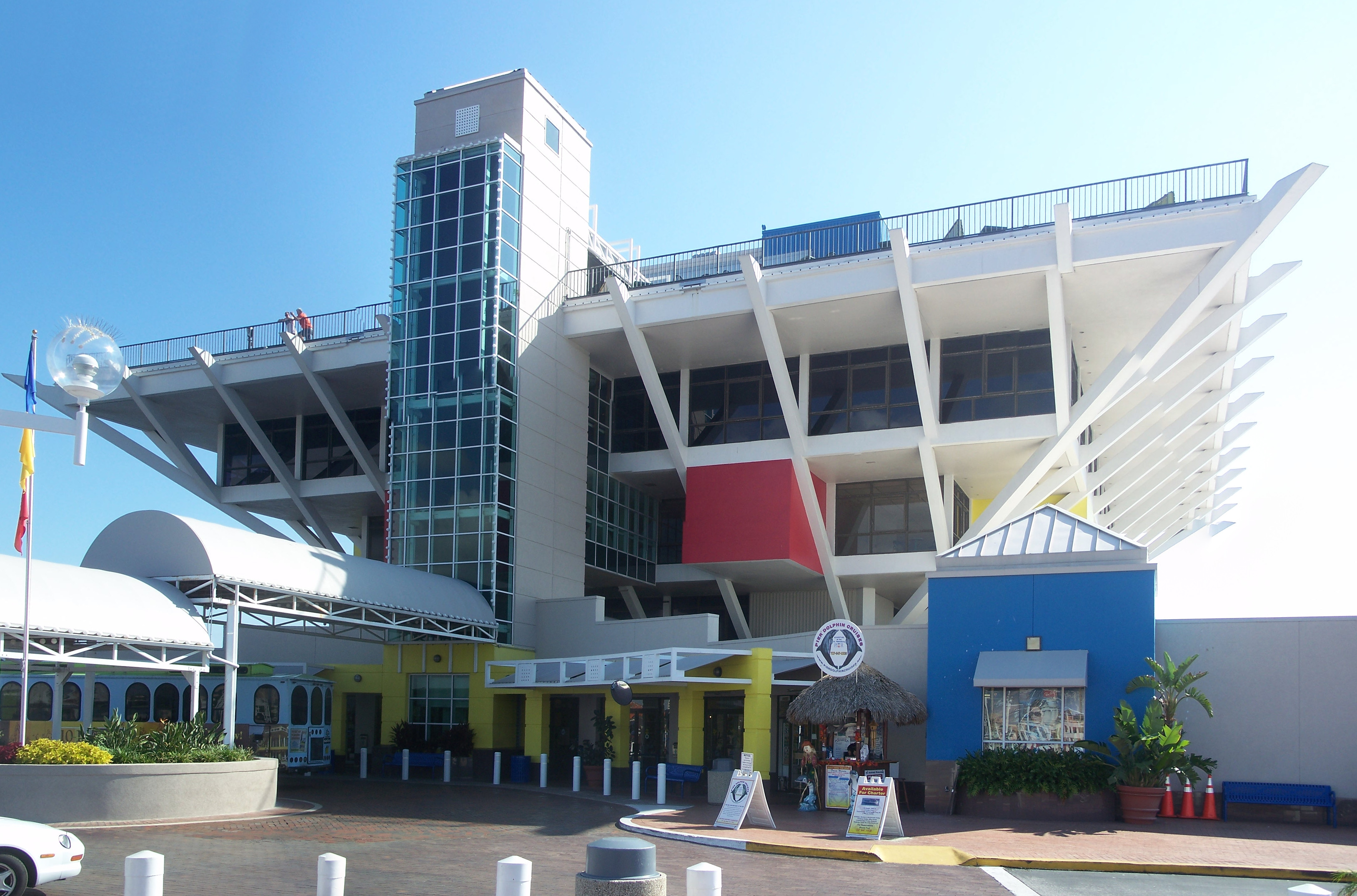
The Inverted Pyramid Pier

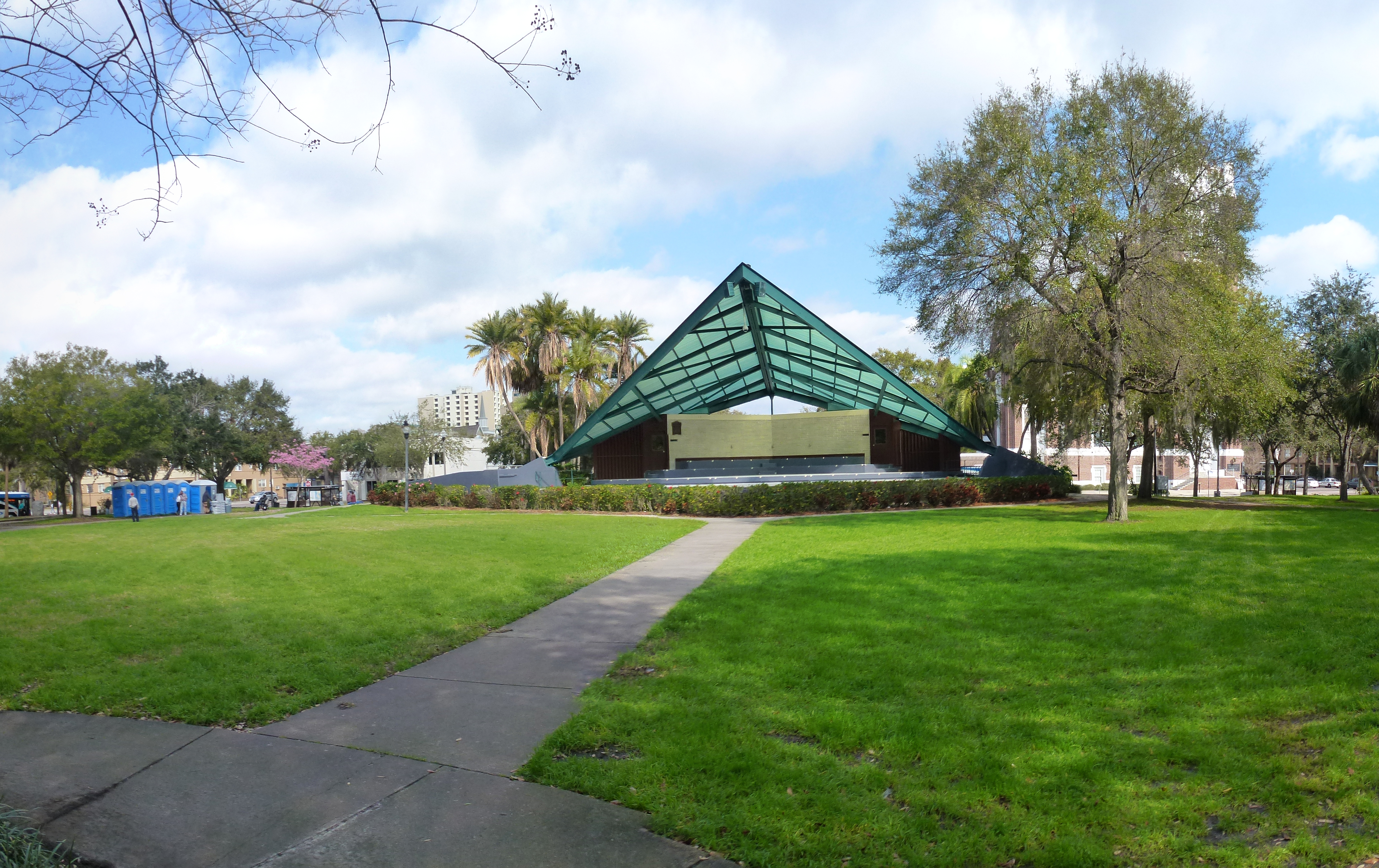
The Williams Park bandstand

- Schuh Residence (1949) St. Petersburg, Florida
- Langford Resort Hotel (1955) Winter Park, Florida
- Caples Fine Arts Center complex, Sarasota, Florida
- Marina Civic Center renovation, Panama City, Florida
- Bay Pines Veterans’ Administration Medical Center (1980s)
- St. Petersburg Pier (aka "Inverted Pyramid," built in 1973, demolished in 2015)
- St. Joseph's Hospital, Tampa
- Pasadena Community Church (1960), St. Petersburg, Florida
- Garden of Peace Lutheran Church
- Grace Evangelical Lutheran Church on Haines Road
- Derby Lane, a steel building
- Tides Hotel
- Langston Holland House in Pinellas Point
- Central Library on 9th Avenue
- National Bank on Tyrone Boulevard
- Federal Building (demolished)
- Hospitality House at Busch Gardens (1959)
- Williams Park Band Shell and Pavilion (1954), a 1955 recipient of the Award of Merit from the American Institute of Architects
- 2900 Pelham Dr. N.

== Libraries ==
Harvard Jolly is a member of the American Library Association and the Florida Library Association. The firm has designed over 120 libraries and has received 19 awards for their designs.

- Boca Raton Public Library
- Oldsmar Public Library
- Mirror Lake Library (Renovations)
- Selby Public Library (Renovations)
- Cagan Crossings Community Library
- Leesburg Public Library
- South Mandarin Branch Library
- Gulf Gate Library
- Countryside Library
- University of South Florida Jane Bancroft Cook Library Addition/Renovation
- Broward County/Broward College South Regional Library
- Cooper Memorial Library at Lake-Sumter State College
- Wilson S. Rivers Library and Media Center at Florida Gateway College
- St. Petersburg College Dennis L. Jones Community Library on the Seminole Campus
