= Radio West Middlesex =

England
- Broadcast area: West Middlesex Hospital

Programming
- Format: Hospital radio

History
- First air date: 1967

Links
- Website: www.radiowestmiddlesex.org.uk

Radio West Middlesex is the volunteer-run hospital radio station of the West Middlesex Hospital in Isleworth, Middlesex. It broadcasts to the patients of the hospital online, on smart speakers and the TuneIn and myTuner radio apps.

Radio West Middlesex has been broadcasting from the West Middlesex University Hospital since 1967. It began broadcasting 24 hours a day in 2003.

The station was the winner of the Station of the Year Bronze award at the Hospital Broadcasting Awards in 2007 and was commended at 2008 Hospital Broadcasting Awards in the same category.

Patients can request music on the two weekly request programmes via the station's website, email, WhatsApp or telephone number.

Radio West Middlesex is a registered charity, number 1050841.
