= 56 Dean Street =

Sexual health clinic in London

- Chelsea and Westminster Hospital NHS Foundation Trust
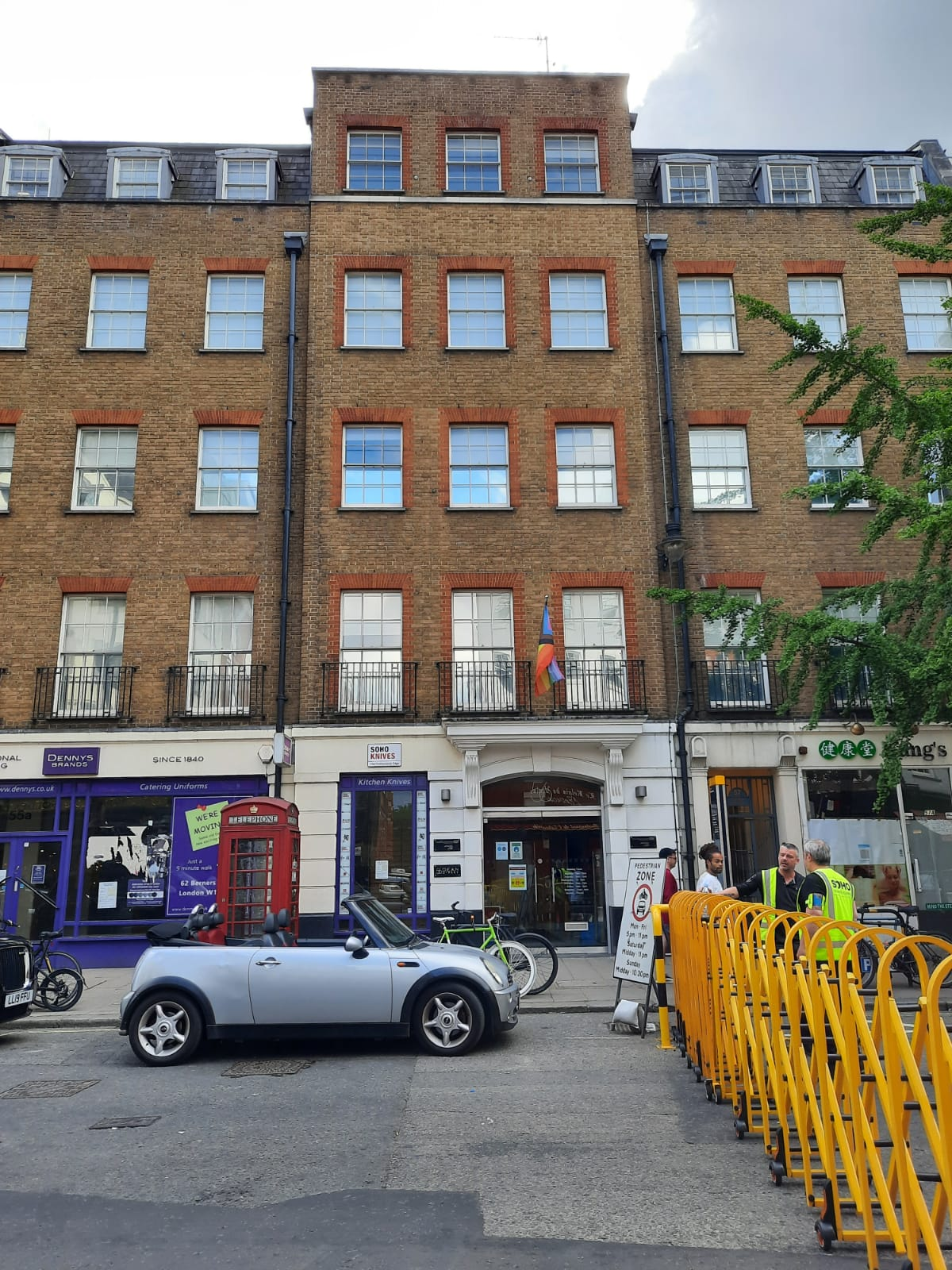

- Location within Greater London

Geography
- Location: 56 Dean Street, Soho, London, England, W1D 6AQ
- Coordinates: 51.5125°N 0.1320°W

Organisation
- Care system: NHS England
- Type: Specialist

Services
- Speciality: Sexual health Gender dysphoria

History
- Former names: Outpatient 6 The Victoria Clinic
- Opened: March 2009 (at current location)

Links
- Website: www.dean.st

56 Dean Street, based in Dean Street in London's Soho district, is a sexual health clinic. Part of the Chelsea and Westminster Hospital NHS Foundation Trust. It also has a second branch, Dean Street Express, located at 34 Dean Street, which offers a sexual disease testing service. As of 2017, the clinic was the largest HIV clinic in Europe. In addition to its specialism in HIV infection and other sexually transmitted infections, it also offers general sexual health care services, including contraception.

== Services ==
=== Primary ===
56 Dean street was a contributor in helping with the HIV/Aids crisis by offering HIV combination prevention. HIV combination prevention is the multifactorial approach to addressing the HIV epidemic. It includes:

- engagement of high-risk communities in regular HIV testing
- condom awareness and use
- easy access to HIV-PEP (Post-Exposure Prophylaxis)
- quick-start HIV treatment; once diagnosed HIV positive, patients are prescribed HIV ART (Anti-Retroviral Therapy) within days after diagnosis, quickening their journey to an noninfectious status, reducing the number of infectious people within communities, and slowing the spread of infection in communities. This is called Treatment as Prevention
- PrEP, which can protect HIV-negative people from HIV infection. The clinic has made the provision of pre-exposure prophylaxis (PrEP) a priority.
- Behavioral advice, support, and psychosocial interventions (e.g. chemsex support, sexual wellbeing education and support)

With the result being that new HIV infection rates in London have dropped dramatically since the introduction of these interventions.

=== Other services ===
56 Dean Street hosts a variety of talking therapies and sexual well-being services.

- Health Advisor teams support patients to understand, manage and cope with their diagnoses. They can also provide counseling and referrals to other kinds of support and therapy. Health Advisors provide guidance in regard to good sexual health practices, safer sex, and the enjoyment of sex. These teams are also on hand to help patients cope emotionally with sexual assaults, domestic violence or substance use issues.
- Psycho-sexual counseling is also available at 56 Dean Street. Psycho-sexual counselors specialize in helping individuals and couples who experience sexual difficulties. It can be a safe space where issues related to sex, sexuality, intimacy and enjoyment can freely be explored without judgment.
- Outreach teams support the clinic's patients and local communities with sexual health screens, vaccinations and advice/referrals. The teams regularly visit a hostel, a Chinese community health center, local bars and a local sauna/bathhouse.
- Chemsex support. In 2011, 56 Dean Street launched the world's first targeted Chemsex support service, providing specialist community and one-to-one support to gay men (and other men who have sex with men) who use specific drugs for sex. Also known colloquially as "Party and Play" (PnP) or "High and Horny" (HnH), Chemsex is not only a public (sexual) health/HIV concern, it is also a social and community sexual well-being issue.
- 56T is a holistic sexual health and well-being service for all trans/non-binary people, their partners and friends. It is a trans-led team, offering a safe, confidential space for anyone who anyone with sexual health or well-being needs. 56 Dean Street's Trans services are award-winning, and have received acknowledgments for inclusivity & diversity, as well as a Nursing Times Award for 'Enhancing Patient Dignity'.
- Under 18 service. Young people's needs are given priority in regard to walk-in consultations/no appointments needed.
- PRIME at 56 Dean Street. Another prioritized group is gay, bisexual (and other men who have sex with men) who have been assessed as being particularly vulnerable to HIV infection. This group is engaged in heightened support involving online content, fast track to HIV prevention information and services, and walk-in (no appointment) access.
- Sex workers are another group of people that have some prioritized sexual health needs. Sex workers are given Gold card status that entitles them to walk-in (appointment-free) testing. Certificates are provided for those patients who require a certificate of health before performing.
- The Dean Street Wellbeing program is a community engagement project that engages vulnerable local communities in education, performance art, film screenings, slam poetry, creative writing, art exhibitions and community/panel discussions.
- TransPlus is a pilot NHS gender dysphoria clinic for adults, aimed at providing accessible trans healthcare as well as sexual health and HIV services

As of 2018, limitations on funding have substantially reduced the clinic's ability to offer its services, with significant reductions in the number of appointments available each day.

== History ==
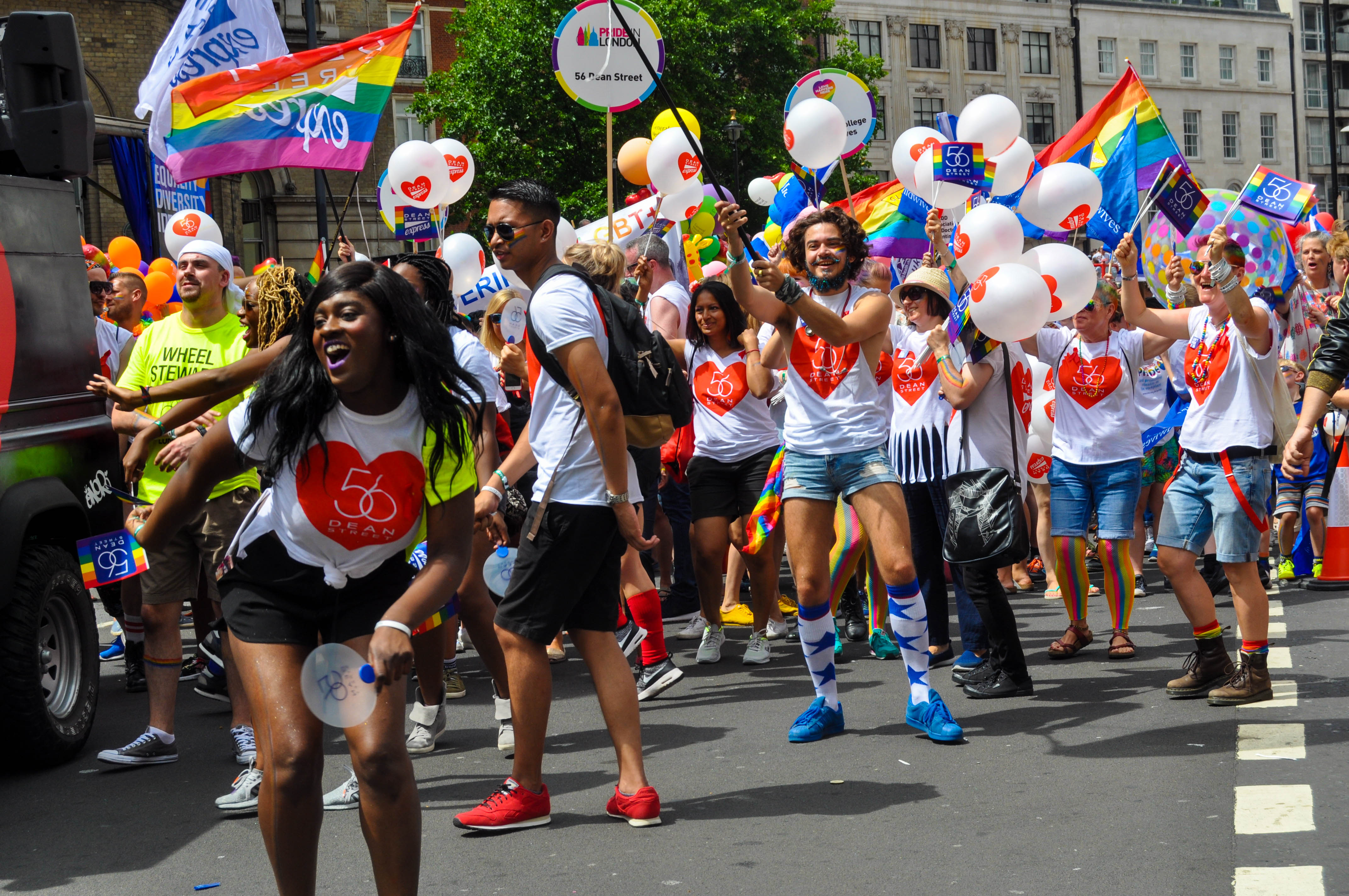
Staff at the 2017 Pride in London march

Dean Street has a long history of providing sexual health services. The world’s first VD (venereal disease) clinic for men was based at 91 Dean Street, London in 1862. Over the years it has had several different names and has been based in different parts of London. Originally it was part of the Westminster Hospital and was known as Outpatient 6. It was at the Westminster Hospital that Professor Brian Gazzard diagnosed one of Europe’s first cases of AIDS in 1981.

In 1993, the Westminster Hospital moved to Fulham Road to become part of the Chelsea and Westminster Hospital NHS Foundation Trust. Outpatient 6 was relocated to Vincent Square and the name was changed to the Victoria Clinic. It has been known as 56 Dean Street since it moved to Soho in March 2009.

In 2011, 56 Dean Street set the World Record for most HIV tests performed in one location on World Aids Day at G-A-Y Bar in Soho, London. In 2014 Dean Street Express was opened, the first clinic in the world to have an on-site Infinity machine, allowing this service to give results within 6 hours.

In 2003, it was the first NHS service to offer rapid 1-hour HIV Point of Care testing.

In 2018, 56 Dean Street "developed the idea of creating a drama series depicting life of men who have sex with men (MSM) in London". They secured funding through HIV charity Wandsworth Oasis to create three episodes of a series called The Grass Is Always Grindr. These three episodes were released on YouTube and formed the first season of the drama, acting as a pilot for the longer second season. The web series proved popular, "garnering over 180,000 views on YouTube within 4 months of its release". A second season was commissioned in collaboration with Public Health England and has since had over 10 million view on YouTube.

== Awards and achievements ==
In October 2014, the CQC (Care Quality Commission) inspection report stated that "There were effective procedures to support a safe and effective service for patients. Clinical standards were adhered to and patients were appropriately involved in research and drug trials. The environment at clinics was clean and uncluttered. The clinics at 56 Dean Street and Dean Street Express were trendy, modern and bright. One patient representative told us the team had brought 'sexual health and HIV services into the 21 Century'. Patients described the service offered at each of the clinics as 'exceptional', 'caring', 'confidential' and 'quick'. Staff were highly trained and were compassionate and caring. They treated patients with dignity and respect and 'normalised' conversations about sexual health. Staff worked in a multidisciplinary way to centre care around the patient."

== 2016 data leak scandal ==
In May 2016, the clinic was fined £180,000 after the details of nearly 800 patients who had visited HIV clinics were leaked in an email. A newsletter issued in 2015 was sent to patients of the clinic, but instead of blind copying patients' email addresses, every recipient was able to view the names and email addresses of other recipients. The scandal caused emotional distress and alarm, and an apology was subsequently issued by the director of Chelsea and Westminster Hospital NHS Foundation Trust on behalf of the clinic.

== Sexual assault controversy ==
In February 2018, the Chelsea and Westminster Trust was forced to agree to a settlement with a former patient as a result of sexual assaults perpetrated by a senior nurse during routine appointments at the Dean Street clinic, dating back to 2013. The clinic found itself embroiled in further scandal after it emerged that multiple complaints had been directed to staff members, including senior management but had been either subsequently ignored or dismissed by internal investigations.
