= West Middlesex University Hospital =

- Chelsea and Westminster Hospital NHS Foundation Trust
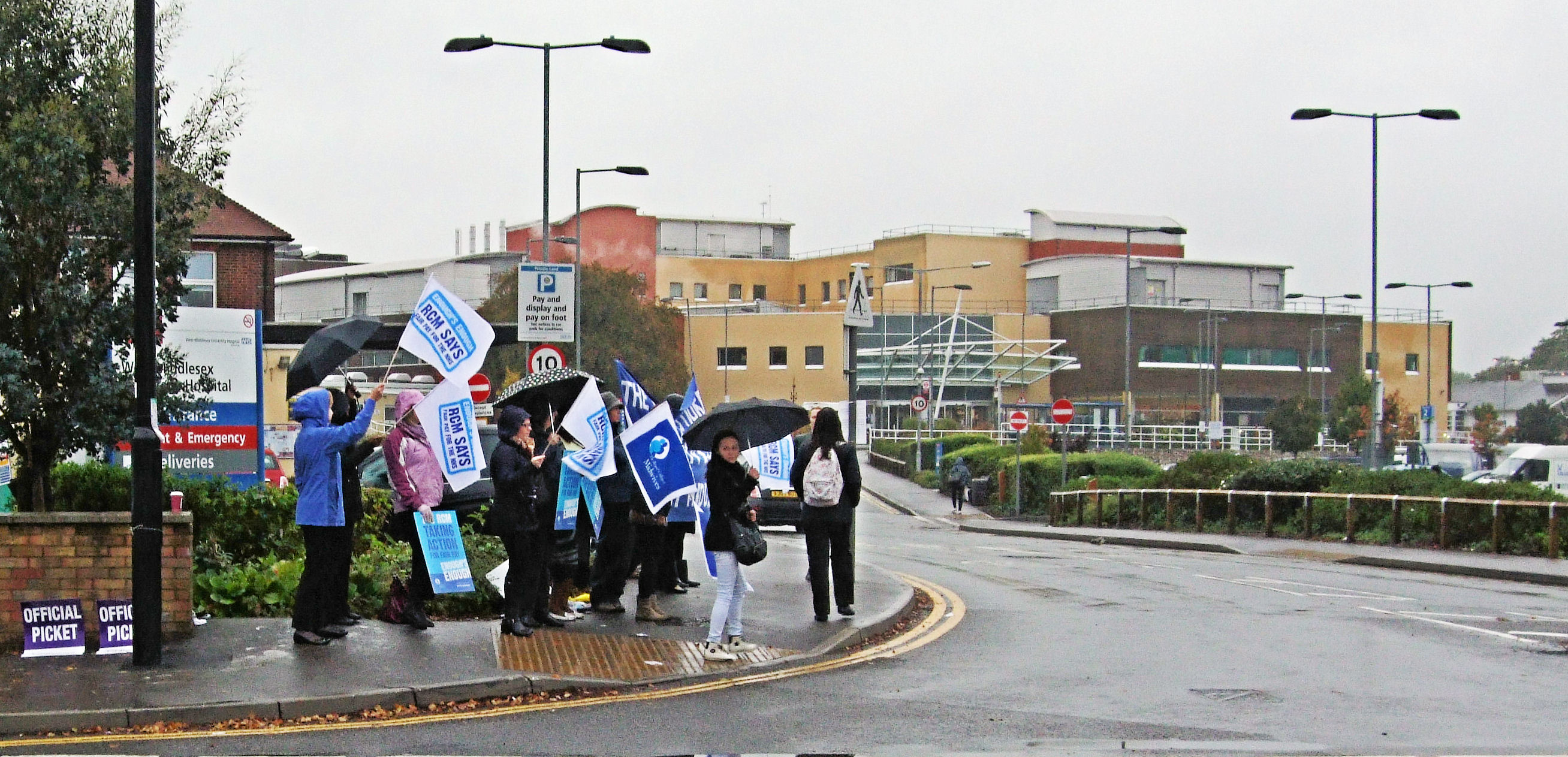
- West Middlesex Hospital in 2014 with picketers from the Royal College of Midwives.

- Location within Hounslow

Geography
- Location: Twickenham Road, Isleworth, London, England, United Kingdom
- Coordinates: 51.4736°N 0.3257°W

Organisation
- Care system: NHS England
- Type: Teaching
- Affiliated university: Imperial College London

Services
- Emergency department: Yes Accident & Emergency
- Beds: c.400

History
- Founded: 1894, current hospital 2003

Links
- Website: chelwest.nhs.uk
- Lists: Hospitals in England

West Middlesex University Hospital (WMUH) is an acute NHS hospital in Isleworth, West London, operated by Chelsea and Westminster Hospital NHS Foundation Trust. It is a teaching hospital of Imperial College School of Medicine and a designated academic health science partner (Imperial College Academic Health Sciences Partnership). West Middlesex University Hospital serves patients in the London Boroughs of Hounslow, Richmond upon Thames and Ealing. The hospital has over 400 beds and provides a full range of clinical services including accident and emergency, acute medicine, care of the elderly, surgery and maternity.

== History ==
In 1894, the Brentford Board of Guardians bought a property at Isleworth from Lord Warkworth to accommodate an infirmary for the local workhouse. The hospital opened by Princess Mary of Teck as the Brentford Workhouse Infirmary in October 1896. It became known as the West Middlesex Hospital in 1920 and the West Middlesex County Hospital in 1931. A new maternity department was opened by Queen Mary as the Queen Mary Maternity Wing in 1932. Following bombing during the World War II, the Queen Mary Maternity Wing was repaired and re-opened by the Duchess of Gloucester in 1960. It became the West Middlesex University Hospital in 1991.

An extensive redevelopment of the site was procured under a Private Finance Initiative contract in 2001. The works, which were carried out by Bouygues at a cost of £55 million, were completed in 2003.

In December 2011, West Middlesex University Hospital was awarded full accreditation by UNICEF as a Baby Friendly hospital, the first London hospital to achieve this award. In September 2012 the trust concluded that it was not viable for it to apply for NHS Foundation Trust status and decided to seek a potential partner. On 1 September 2015, West Middlesex University Hospital became part of Chelsea and Westminster Hospital NHS Foundation Trust.

== See also ==
- List of hospitals in England
- List of NHS trusts
- Radio West Middlesex
