= Gary Yates (cricketer) =

English cricketer (born 1967)

Gary Yates (born 20 September 1967 in Ashton-under-Lyne, Lancashire) is a former English cricketer, an off-spinner who played for Lancashire from 1989 to 2004 taking 184 first-class wickets. He subsequently became 2nd team captain and coach. He has been assistant coach at Lancashire since 2008.

Yates attended Manchester Grammar School where he played alongside future England cricket captain Michael Atherton and future Lancs and Notts player Mark Crawley.

He is now coaching cricket at Merchant Taylors' Boys' School, Crosby.
