= John Crawley =

English cricketer (born 1971)

Personal information
- Full name: John Paul Crawley
- Born: 21 September 1971 (age 55); Maldon, Essex, England
- Nickname: Creepy
- Height: 6 ft 2 in (1.88 m)
- Batting: Right-handed
- Bowling: Right-arm medium
- Role: Batsman
- Relatives: Mark Crawley (brother); Peter Crawley (brother)

International information
- National side: England
- Test debut (cap 569): 21 July 1994 v South Africa
- Last Test: 2 January 2003 v Australia
- ODI debut (cap 130): 15 December 1994 v Zimbabwe
- Last ODI: 3 February 1999 v Sri Lanka

Domestic team information
- Years: Team
- 1990–2001: Lancashire
- 1991–1993: Cambridge University
- 2002–2009: Hampshire (squad no. 5)

Career statistics
Competition	Test	ODI	FC	LA
Matches	37	13	351	308
Runs scored	1,800	235	24,361	8,681
Batting average	34.61	21.36	46.49	31.91
100s/50s	4/9	0/2	54/133	8/55
Top score	156*	73	311*	114
Balls bowled	–	–	215	6
Wickets	–	–	2	0
Bowling average	–	–	141.50	–
5 wickets in innings	–	–	0	–
10 wickets in match	–	–	0	–
Best bowling	–	–	1/7	–
Catches/stumpings	29/–	1/1	222/1	97/4
- Source: Cricinfo, 27 September 2009

John Paul Crawley (born 21 September 1971) is a former English first-class cricketer who played at international level for England and county cricket for Hampshire and Lancashire. Crawley, one of three brothers who all played first-class cricket, was a right-handed batsman and occasional wicket-keeper.

Nicknamed "Creepy", he promised much in his early career; he was a leading run-scorer at Under-19 international level and Young Cricketer of the Year in 1994. An elegant leg-side hitter and player of spin bowling, a lack of off-side shots hampered his international career, as did injury. He enjoyed a rejuvenation in 2002 when he joined Hampshire, following legal battles with Lancashire, and celebrated his recall to the England team with a Test century at Lord's. Crawley played in 37 Test matches in total.

Crawley nevertheless remained prolific at domestic level, maintaining a batting average of 46.49 into his late-thirties. Upon announcing his retirement in 2009 he was hailed as "one of the most prolific batsmen in county cricket for nearly two decades" and is regarded alongside his contemporaries Graeme Hick and Mark Ramprakash as a hugely talented player who failed to realise his full potential at international level.

== Early career ==
Crawley played cricket while at Manchester Grammar School where he broke a number of batting records previously held by Mike Atherton. After finishing school, he continued his education at Trinity College, Cambridge.

Crawley played as a paid amateur for Farnworth CC in the Bolton League before moving on to bigger things with Lancashire County Cricket Club. He made his first-class debut for Lancashire in the 1990 season. During his time as a university student, he played first-class cricket for both Lancashire and Cambridge University. After graduation he turned professional and stayed on at Lancashire, becoming team captain in 1999–2001.

Crawley began to produce a number of impressive innings. In 1993, he scored 109 for Lancashire as they defeated a strong Australian cricket team in a tour match. The tourists' team had included Shane Warne and Merv Hughes, and Crawley's performance moved the Australian coach Bob Simpson to label him the best batsman they had played against that summer. This was during the 1993 Ashes series in which Australia comfortably defeated England. In 1994, he was named Young Cricketer of the Year by the Cricket Writers' Association.

== International career ==
Crawley was selected for the England A team to tour South Africa during the 1993–94 season. In one tour match, he scored 286 against Eastern Province. He followed this up with 281 not out against Somerset the following season.

Having impressed the selectors, he was chosen to play for England during the 1994 Test series against South Africa. However, he struggled against the South African pace bowling attack who exposed a weakness on his off side.

Despite his poor start to international cricket, Crawley was selected in the touring squad for the 1994–95 Ashes series in Australia. He produced his first substantial innings for England scoring two 70s in the 3rd and 4th Tests of the series, but got a pair in the 5th. During the tour, he was criticised for being overweight – an issue he resolved for the following season.

Crawley was in-and-out of the England team over the next few years. In 1996 he scored 106 against Pakistan, his first Test century, and in 1998 he scored 156 not out against Sri Lanka, his highest Test score. However, a poor performance during the 1998–99 Ashes series led to him being dropped from the side again.

He was recalled for Sri Lanka's tour of England in 2002, and made a century against India at Lord's later that year. Over the next year he was used as first reserve, and in January 2003 played his last Test match – England's fifth Test victory over Australia at Sydney.

== Move to Hampshire ==
In 2002, Crawley unsuccessfully sued Lancashire in a bid to free himself of his contract to the county, and was forced to buy out his contract with a contribution from Hampshire, whom he joined in March. He scored 272 on his debut against Kent, and earned an international recall by averaging over 100 after his first three games.

In the absence of the suspended Shane Warne, Crawley captained Hampshire during the 2003 season. He continued to score heavily in county cricket for Hampshire. His highest first-class score is 311 not out, scored in September 2005 against Nottinghamshire, beating his previous best of 301 not out which he reached in 2004 also against Nottinghamshire. Crawley was awarded a benefit year for the 2008 County Championship.

Crawley announced on 8 August 2009 that at the end of the 2009 County Championship he would be retiring from all forms of first-class cricket, stating he did not want to stand in the way of emerging talent at Hampshire.

== Teaching career ==
Crawley became a full-time member of staff at Marlborough College, a public school in Wiltshire. In February 2012 he became Head of Cricket at Magdalen College School in Oxford. In 2013 he moved to Oakham School to teach History and become Director of Cricket. In 2015, he joined the academic staff at Oundle School in Northamptonshire, teaching History and acting as Master in Charge of cricket.

Sporting positions
Preceded by Robin Smith	Hampshire cricket captains 2003	Succeeded by Shane Warne
