= Nick Gandon =

English cricketer (1956–2025)

Personal information
- Full name: Nicholas John Charles Gandon
- Born: 7 July 1956; Leicester, England
- Died: 28 February 2025 (aged 68)
- Batting: Right-handed
- Bowling: Right-arm off break

Domestic team information
- Years: Team
- 1994–1996: Hertfordshire
- 1989–1993: Lincolnshire
- 1979: Combined Universities
- 1979: Oxford University
- 1975–1988: Hertfordshire

Career statistics
Competition	First-class	List A
Matches	8	3
Runs scored	170	32
Batting average	14.16	10.66
100s/50s	0/0	0/0
Top score	38	31
Catches/stumpings	6/–	0/–
- Source: Cricinfo, 25 June 2011

Nicholas John Charles Gandon (7 July 1956 – 28 February 2025) was an English cricketer. Gandon was a right-handed batsman who bowled right-arm off break.

== Biography ==
Gandon was born in Leicester. He made his debut in county cricket for Hertfordshire in the 1975 Minor Counties Championship. He studied at Durham University, where he completed a General Studies degree in 1978 and earned a Palatinate for his cricketing activities. Following his time at Durham, he made his first-class debut for Oxford University against Hampshire in 1979. He made seven further first-class appearances for the University, all coming in 1979, with the last against the touring Sri Lankans. In his eight first-class matches, he scored 170 runs at an average of 14.16, with a high score of 38. 1979 also saw him make his List A debut for Combined Universities against Essex in the Benson & Hedges Cup.

After leaving Oxford University, Gandon proceeded to play Minor counties cricket for Hertfordshire until 1988. He joined Lincolnshire for the 1989 season, making his debut for the county against Hertfordshire in the 1989 Minor Counties Championship. He played Minor counties cricket for Lincolnshire from 1989 to 1993, making 35 Minor Counties Championship appearances and nine MCCA Knockout Trophy matches. He played his first List A appearances for Lincolnshire against Gloucestershire in the 1990 NatWest Trophy, a match in which he scored 31 runs before being dismissed by Mark Alleyne. He made his second and final List A appearance for Lincolnshire in the 1991 NatWest Trophy against Nottinghamshire, with Gandon being dismissed by Mark Crawley. Leaving Lincolnshire at the end of the 1993 season, Gandon returned to Hertfordshire, where he played Minor counties cricket from 1994 to 1996.

Professionally, Gandon worked in a number of independent schools, where he held a range of senior management positions. In 2003 he was appointed Director of the Cricket Foundation, where he devised and implemented the Chance to Shine campaign.

In May 2009, Gandon launched third-sector fundraising company Cause4 with Michelle Wright and Charles Pike. In 2013 he founded Aureus Social Ventures which offers consultancy services to charities, social enterprises and socially-driven businesses. Outside of his professional life Gandon was Chairman of Hoddesdon Cricket Club, Chairman of a homelessness charity and a trustee of a prison mentoring charity.

Gandon died of cancer on 28 February 2025, at the age of 68.
