= Bill Crawley =

American academic

William B. Crawley, Jr
- Education: Hampden-Sydney College, University of Virginia
- Occupation: Professor at the University of Mary Washington
- Known for: Distinguished professor of the Great Lives program
- Notable work: Harry Byrd's Virginia and Centennial History of the University of Mary Washington

William B. Crawley, Jr. is a Distinguished Professor of History and a historian at the University of Mary Washington in Fredericksburg, Virginia. He is the director of the Great Lives program and teaches the course Great Lives: Biographical Approaches to History and Culture. His primary teaching fields are recent American history and history of the American South.

== Biography ==
Crawley earned a B.A. in history from Hampden-Sydney college. As well as an M.A and a Ph.D. from the University of Virginia. Afterwards, in 1970, he went on to become a professor at the University of Mary Washington for 40 years. While there, he earned several awards for distinguished teaching and skill in administrative positions. He would come to serve as the Distinguished Professor Emeritus of History at the university. In 1994 he received the Grellet C. Simpson Award for outstanding teaching. By 2005, the graduating seniors chose him for the Mary W. Pinschmidt Award as the professor who had the greatest impact on students’ lives.

== Bibliography ==
- 1978: Bill Tuck: A Political Life in Harry Byrd's Virginia
- 2008: Centennial History of The University of Mary Washington
