= Ian Crawley =

English footballer

Personal information
- Date of birth: 18 May 1962
- Place of birth: Coventry, England
- Date of death: 8 July 2008 (aged 46)
- Place of death: Warwick, England
- Position(s): Striker

Ian Crawley (14 May 1962 – 8 July 2008) was an English footballer. He played for a number of clubs throughout a long career and holds the distinction of having scored winning goals in two different finals at Wembley Stadium.

Crawley played for Kettering Town, Solihull Borough, Nuneaton Borough, VS Rugby and Telford United. It was with the latter two clubs that he achieved his notable double. In 1983, he scored the only goal as VS Rugby beat Halesowen Town 1–0 to win the FA Vase; six years later, he again was the scorer as Telford beat Macclesfield Town by the same score in the 1989 FA Trophy final.

== Illness and death ==
Crawley was diagnosed with Motor neurone disease (known as Lou Gehrig's disease (ALS) in North America) in 2006 and was dealt a further blow when it was discovered that he was also suffering from terminal pancreatic cancer. Before his death, an appeal was launched in his name to raise money and awareness of the disease.
