= Demens-Rumbough-Crawley House =

Historic house in North Carolina, United States

- U.S. National Register of Historic Places
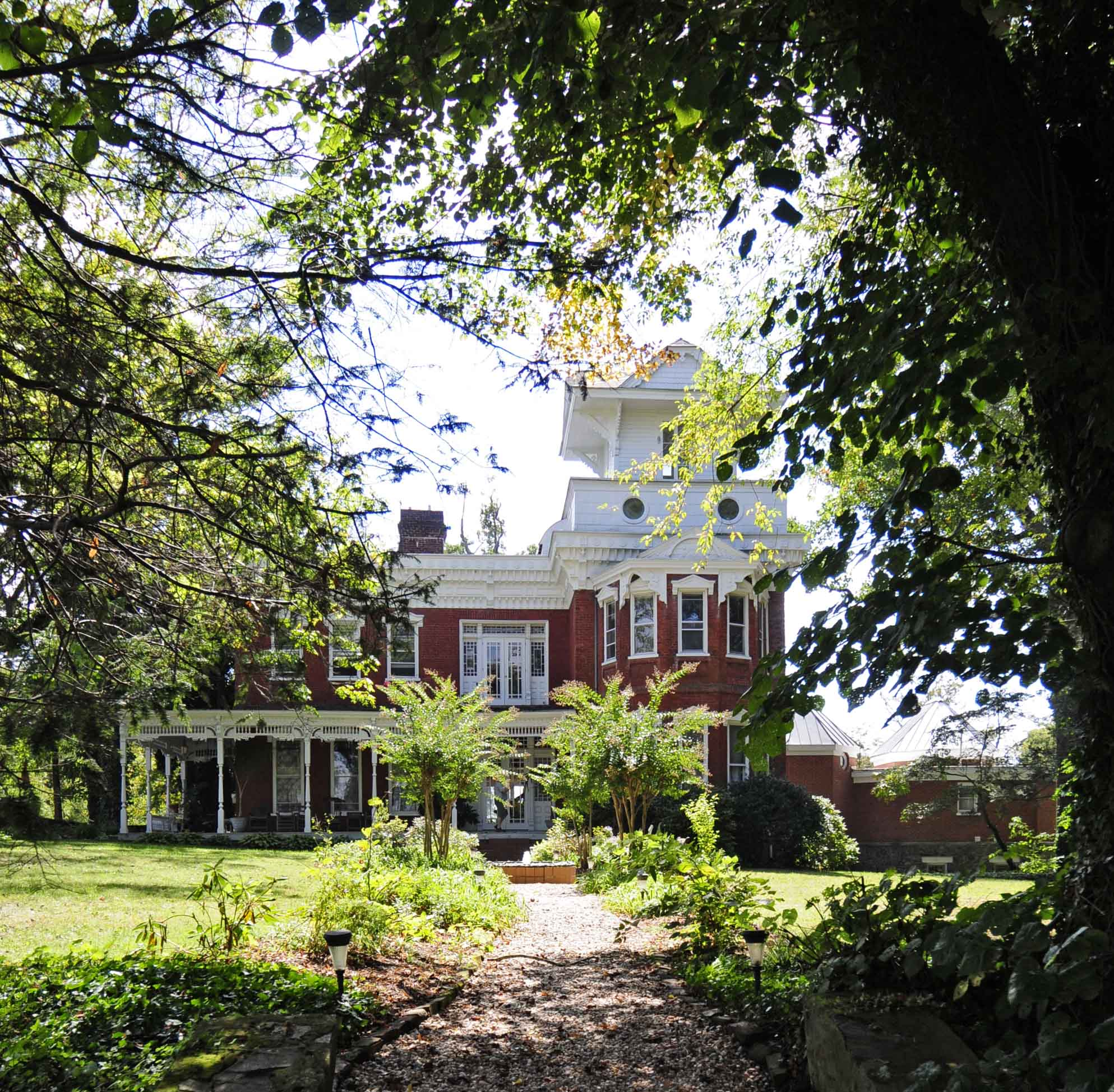
- Demens-Rumbough-Crawley House, September 2012

- Location within North Carolina Location within the United States
- Location: 31 Park Ave., Asheville, North Carolina
- Coordinates: 35°35′21″N 82°33′59″W
- Area: 6 acres (2.4 ha)
- Built: c. 1890
- Built by: Demens, Peter A.
- Architectural style: Late Victorian
- NRHP reference No.: 82003435
- Added to NRHP: June 1, 1982

Demens-Rumbough-Crawley House, also known as Hanger Hall, is a historic home built by Peter Demens, located at 31 Park Ave. N., Asheville, Buncombe County, North Carolina. It was built about 1890, and is a two-story, brick Victorian-style dwelling on a stone foundation. It features a low hipped roof, rigid and geometrical exterior ornamentation, and projecting three-stage tower and bay. Also on the property is a contributing small frame garage.

It was listed on the National Register of Historic Places in 1982.
