= Crawley, West Virginia =

Unincorporated community in West Virginia, United States

- Unincorporated community
- Location within West Virginia Location within the United States
- Coordinates: 37°56′05″N 80°39′07″W
- Country: United States
- State: West Virginia
- County: Greenbrier
- Elevation: 2,418 ft (737 m)
- Time zone: UTC-5 (Eastern (EST))
  - Summer (DST): UTC-4 (EDT)
- ZIP code: 24931
- Area codes: 304 & 681
- GNIS feature ID: 1537808

Crawley is an unincorporated community in Greenbrier County, West Virginia, United States, on U.S. Route 60, southeast of Rupert. Its ZIP code is 24931. It is named for the town of Crawley in West Sussex, England.
