= John Constantine Williams Sr. =

Cofounder of St. Petersburg, Florida

John Constantine Williams, Sr. (died 1892) was the cofounder of St. Petersburg, Florida, with Captain Peter Demens. Williams Park is named for him.

== Biography ==
Williams came from Detroit, and purchased the land in the area of what became St. Petersburg, Florida, in 1876. Williams suffered from asthma and moved to Florida for his health. He lived in Tampa until 1887 when a yellow fever epidemic chased him across Tampa Bay.

Peter Demens (born Pyotr Alexeyevitch Dementyev) was instrumental in bringing the terminus of a railroad to the area in 1888. Williams transferred part of his land holdings to the Russian exile in return for Demens extending his Orange Belt Railway line from Sanford, Florida, west to Tarpon Springs and then south along the Gulf coast to Williams's settlement. Williams agreed to let Demens name the settlement and the first train arrived in 1888. The town's population was 30 people but rose quickly after to about 270 by the 1890 census.

St. Petersburg was incorporated on February 29, 1892, the same year Williams died. It had a population of approximately 300 people. It was named after Saint Petersburg, Russia, where Peter Demens had spent half of his youth. A legend says that John C. Williams and Peter Demens flipped a coin to see who would have the honor of naming the city. Peter Demens is said to have won and named the city after his childhood home, while John C. Williams named the first hotel (built by Demens) after his birthplace of Detroit. The Detroit Hotel still exists downtown after a conversion into condominiums. The oldest running hotels are the historic Pier Hotel, built in 1921, formally Hotel Cordova and The Heritage Hotel, built in 1926. Demens died in 1919.

Williams had a Queen Anne-style Victorian house constructed in 1891 at 444 Fifth Avenue South. It was moved to the campus of the University of South Florida St. Petersburg in 1995.
