= Mark Crawley =

English cricketer

Personal information
- Full name: Mark Andrew Crawley
- Born: 16 December 1967 (age 58); Newton-le-Willows, Lancashire, England
- Batting: Right-handed
- Bowling: Right-arm medium
- Relatives: John Crawley (brother); Peter Crawley (brother)

Domestic team information
- Years: Team
- 1987–1990: Oxford University
- 1990: Lancashire
- 1991–1994: Nottinghamshire
- 1999: Middlesex Cricket Board

Career statistics
Competition	First-class	List A
Matches	80	77
Runs scored	3,778	1,293
Batting average	32.48	24.86
100s/50s	8/14	0/5
Top score	160*	94*
Balls bowled	6,144	2,334
Wickets	64	41
Bowling average	46.64	41.82
5 wickets in innings	1	0
10 wickets in match	0	0
Best bowling	6/92	4/26
Catches/stumpings	68/–	22/–
- Source: Cricinfo, 20 November 2010

Mark Andrew Crawley (born 16 December 1967) is a former English cricketer. Crawley was a right-handed batsman who bowled right-arm medium. He was born in Newton-le-Willows, Lancashire.

== Early career ==
Crawley made his first-class debut for Oxford University against Kent in 1987. From 1987 to 1990, he represented the university in 24 first-class matches, the last of which came against Cambridge University. During his 4 seasons with the university, he scored 1,189 runs at a batting average of 44.03, with 8 half centuries, 3 centuries and a high score of 140. In the field he took 17 catches. With the ball he claimed 24 wickets at a bowling average of 62.29, with a single five wicket haul which gave him best figures of 6/92. While playing for the university, Crawley also made a single first-class appearance for a combined Oxford and Cambridge Universities team against the touring New Zealanders in 1990.

In 1987, he made his debut in List A cricket for a Combined Universities team against Somerset in the 1987 Benson and Hedges Cup. From 1987 to 1990, he represented the Combined Universities in 13 List A matches, the last of which came against Hampshire in the 1990 Benson and Hedges Cup.

== County career ==
In 1990, Crawley made a single first-class appearance for Lancashire against the touring Sri Lankans.

The following season he joined Nottinghamshire, making his first-class debut for the county against Oxford University. From 1991 to 1994, he represented the county in 54 first-class matches, the last of which came against Somerset in the 1994 County Championship. In his 54 first-class matches for the county, he scored 2,047 runs at an average of 28.04, with 6 half centuries, 5 centuries and a high score of 160*. In the field he took 50 catches, while with the ball he took 37 wickets at an average of 38.18, with best figures of 3/18.

During the same period from 1991 to 1994, Crawley played 63 List A matches for Nottinghamshire, the last of which came against Worcestershire in the 1994 AXA Equity and Law League. In his 63 matches for the county in that format, he scored 1,093 runs at an average of 26.02, with 4 half centuries and a high score of 94*. In the field he took 18 catches. With the ball he took 35 wickets at an average of 37.91, with best figures of 4/26.

In 1999, he made a single List A appearance for the Middlesex Cricket Board against Cumberland in the 1999 NatWest Trophy.

== Family ==
His youngest brother, John, played Test and One Day International cricket for England. He also played first-class cricket for Lancashire, Cambridge University and Hampshire. His younger brother Peter also played first-class cricket for Cambridge University. He is married and has three children.
