= Peter Demens =

Russian nobleman (1850–1919)

- Пётр Дементьев
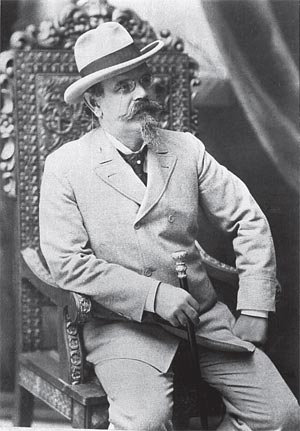
- Born: Pyotr Alexeyevitch Dementyev; May 13, 1850; Vesyegonsky Uyezd, Russia
- Died: January 21, 1919 (aged 68); Alta Loma, Rancho Cucamonga, California, U.S.
- Education: First Technical School of Saint Petersburg, Russia
- Occupations: Forester, lumber businessman, railway owner
- Known for: Co-founder of St. Petersburg, Florida
- Spouse: Raisa Borisenko
- Children: 5

Peter Demens (13 May [O.S. 1 May] 1850 – January 21, 1919), born Pyotr Alekseyevich Dementyev (Russian: Пётр Алексеевич Дементьев), was a Russian nobleman who migrated in 1881 to the United States and became a railway owner and one of the founders of St. Petersburg, Florida, United States.

== Early life ==
Demens was born in May 1850 as Pyotr Alexeyevitch Dementyev to a wealthy family in Vesyegonsky Uyezd within Tver Governorate of the Russian Empire. Demens was a liberally minded, well-educated aristocrat, a first cousin of Prince Petrov and a captain in the Russian Imperial Guard. His father died when he was an infant, leaving him two estates, one near the capital of Saint Petersburg and another close to Moscow. His mother died when he was 4. He reportedly grew up in a stone house with servants and became master of his family estate at 17. He received training as a forester managing his large family estates, which would serve him well in the future.

Demens was raised by his maternal uncle Anastasy Aleksandrovich Kaliteyevsky, marshal of the Vesyegonsk district nobility, who became the boy's tutor and guardian of his land estates. When he was 10, Demens was sent to Saint Petersburg to study at Gymnasium no. 3. Demens did well enough to transfer to the First Technical School in Saint Petersburg.

In 1867, he became a lieutenant in the emperor's infantry guard. He rose through the ranks to command sentries at the emperor's Winter Palace and the home of Tsesarevich Alexander. Four years later, he resigned his commission and became a squire. He married Raisa Borisenko, who was also an orphan brought up by relatives. He was elected as county marshal of nobility, and became an outspoken writer and active in his rural government. It is reported that Demens sympathized with populist leaders and never adopted Marxist or radical notions.

Some sources state that Demens became outspoken about the imperial government and left Russia following the assassination of Emperor Alexander II in 1881. Other sources note that he left Russia as a political exile in 1880. He emigrated to the United States and anglicized his name to Peter Demens.

== In the United States ==
In May 1881, "leaving his family behind, [Demens] sailed for New York, hoping for American promise of mobility and opportunity". He reportedly "spent his sea voyage studying an English language textbook". "Arriving in New York with $3,000 ($100,086 in 2025) to start a new life, Demens embarked for Florida" ("spending one day in New York before boarding a train bound for his cousin's Jacksonville orange grove"). Because land in Jacksonville was expensive for him at the time, Demens took "a steamer to the back country, where he expected to get more for his money".

He decided to enter the lumber business ("investing in a sawmill and a construction company in Longwood, Fla."), and in 1885 Demens was supplying railroad ties to the narrow-gauge Orange Belt Railway. When the railroad could not pay its debts, Demens took over its charter. As owner of the railroad, Demens "[extended] its lines to link Kissimmee with Jacksonville and Tampa Bay" (with the help of Hamilton Disston). Among potential investors, he successfully invited and entertained Philip D. Armour in Florida, and named a train depot in his honor. Demens went into great debt to get the line completed, and sold it in 1889; the railroad eventually was bought by Henry B. Plant, owner of the Plant System of railroads.

Demens co-founded St. Petersburg, Florida, with John Constantine Williams Sr. On June 8, 1888, the first train pulled into the terminus in southern Pinellas County (the end of the line) with one passenger. The area had no official name and no real streets or sidewalks. After a drawing of straws, Demens won and named the location of his terminus St. Petersburg, Florida, after Saint Petersburg, Russia, where he had spent half his youth. Williams would have named it Detroit, which name was given to the first hotel.

== Death and legacy ==
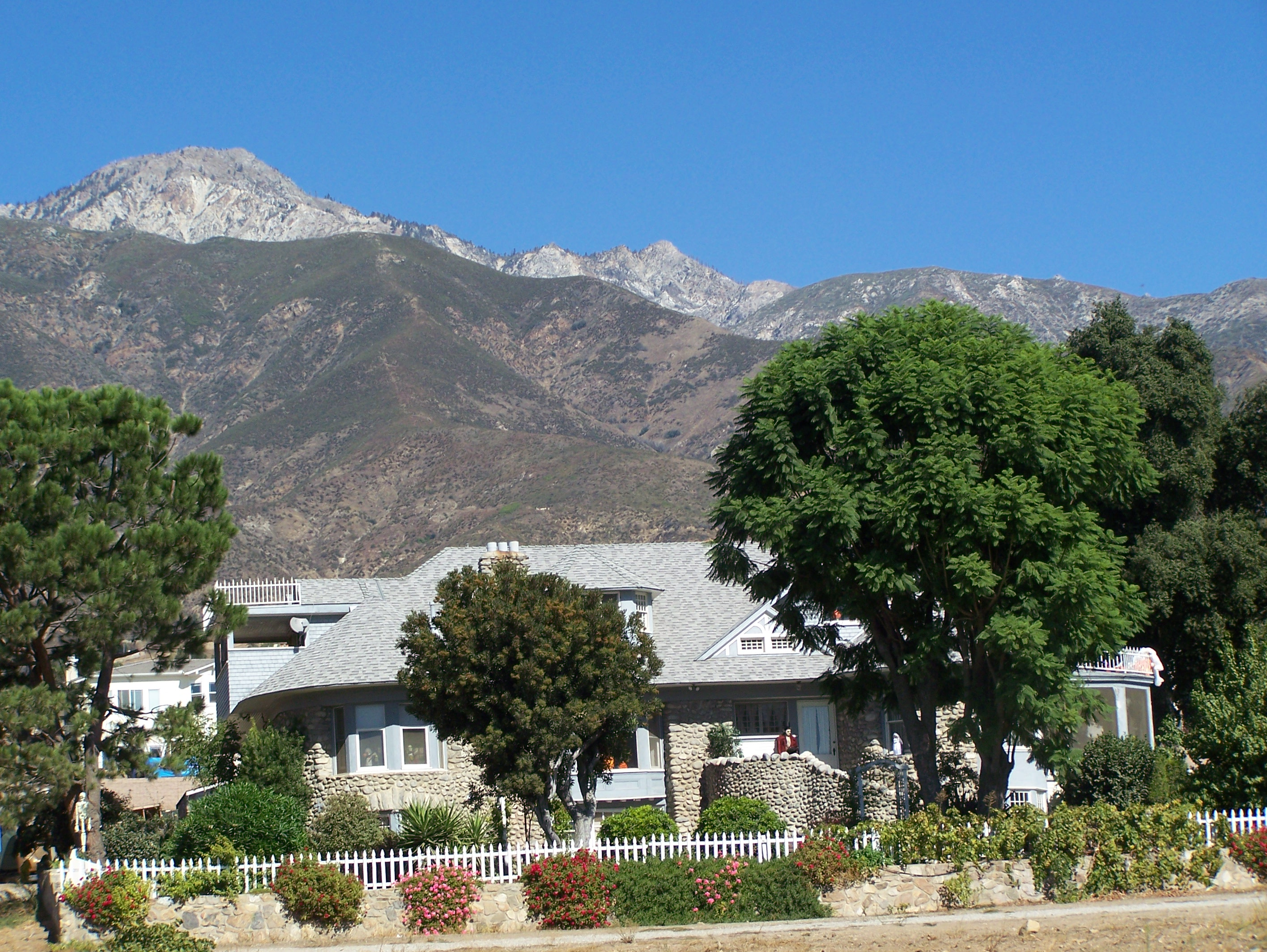
The Demens-Tolstoy Estate on Hillside and Archibald

Demens eventually retired to Alta Loma, California, to the family ranch that later became known as the Demens-Tolstoy Estate. He died there in January 1919; he was survived by his wife, three sons, and two daughters.

Reportedly, "the descendants of Peter Demens now live in California and British Columbia, [including] a grandson, Peter Demens Tolstoy ("writer Leo Tolstoy, who wrote Anna Karenina and The Death of Ivan Ilych, is his great-grand uncle"), a great-grandson, Greg Demens, and a great-great-grandson, Greg Demens." Demens Landing in St. Petersburg, Florida is named in his honor.

In 1979, a historical marker honoring Demens was erected in St. Petersburg, Florida, by the Congress of Russian Americans.

== See also ==
- Demens-Rumbough-Crawley House, built by Demens in North Carolina, U.S.

== Bibliography ==
- Gene Burnett. "Florida's Past: People and Events That Shaped the State". Pineapple Press. August 1998. History – 280 pages. ISBN 1-56164-115-4.
- Grismer, Karl H. "The Story of St. Petersburg". St. Petersburg, FL: P. K. Smith, 1948.
- Peter Demens. "My Life in America".
- Mohoff, George & Jack Valov. "A Stroll Through Russiantown" 1996. Chapter 13, pp. 83–88, "Captain Peter A. Demens".

== Sources ==
- "Тверской, П. А." . Brockhaus and Efron Encyclopedic Dictionary (in Russian). 1906.
