= Cause4 =

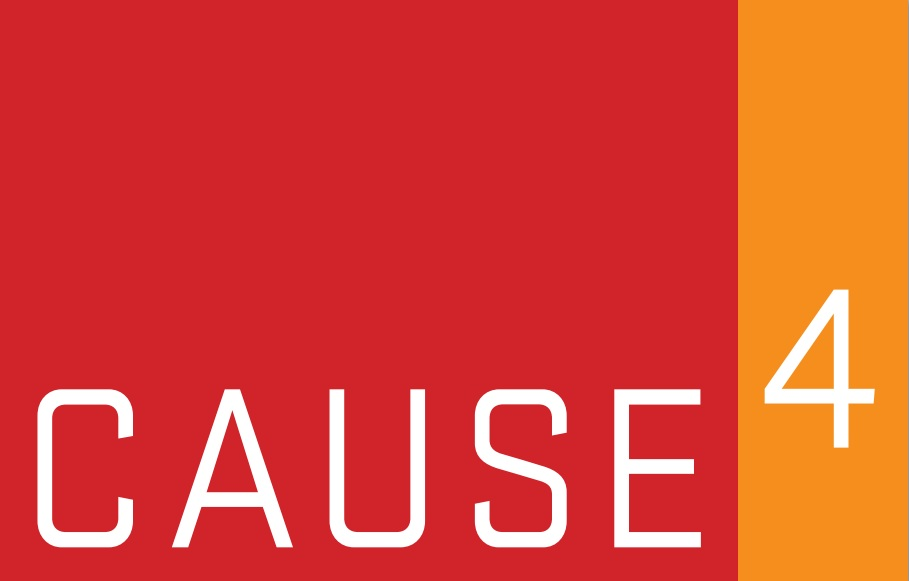
- Company type: Private
- Industry: Third Sector fundraising
- Founded: May 2009
- Founders: Michelle Wright, Nick Gandon
- Headquarters: London, United Kingdom
- Website: www.cause4.co.uk

Cause4 is one of the UK's first B Corporations that works in partnership with the charity sector, corporates and philanthropists in the United Kingdom and internationally. It was launched in May 2009 and aims to be a modernising influence within the charity sector. The company works with long-established national charities as well as smaller local charities and recently established social enterprises, both as a fundraiser and strategy consultant. Cause4 also specialises in developing philanthropic foundations for individuals and companies and implementing company social responsibility strategies.

In 2010 Cause4 developed a training programme through which to address the shortage of development and fundraising personnel within the charity, arts, sports and education sectors. This programme became known as the Cause4 Entrepreneurship programme in March 2013. The company also hosts a range of fundraising, creative and digital apprenticeships.

Other graduate development programmes led by Cause4 include a Fellowship programme for the Arts Fundraising and Philanthropy Programme funded by Arts Council England and development of a Creative Entrepreneurs programme for start up creative businesses in partnership with the Guildhall School of Music & Drama

In 2014-15, the company raised over £15 million for charitable causes. The company claims to regularly raise over £750,000 in charitable income per month and has raised over £47 million in charitable income since set up.

== Directors ==
- Michelle Wright
- Charles Pike
