= Peter Crawley (cricketer) =

English cricketer (born 1969)

Personal information
- Born: 4 January 1969 (age 57); Newton-le-Willows, Lancashire
- Source: Cricinfo, 28 April 2017

Peter Crawley (born 4 January 1969) is an English cricketer. He played four first-class matches for Cambridge University Cricket Club in 1992.

== See also ==
- List of Cambridge University Cricket Club players
