= 1991 NatWest Trophy =

- Administrator: Test and County Cricket Board
- Cricket format: Limited overs cricket (60 overs)
- Tournament format: Knockout
- Champions: Hampshire (1st title)
- Participants: 32
- Matches: 31
- Most runs: 331 Robin Smith (Hampshire)
- Most wickets: 15 Cardigan Connor (Hampshire)

The 1991 NatWest Trophy was a limited-overs English county cricket tournament, held between 26 June and 7 September 1991. The competition was won by Hampshire who beat Surrey by 4 wickets in the final at Lord's.

== Format ==
The seventeen first-class counties, joined by 13 Minor Counties: Bedfordshire, Berkshire, Buckinghamshire, Cambridgeshire, Devon, Dorset, Durham, Hertfordshire, Lincolnshire, Norfolk, Oxfordshire, Shropshire and Staffordshire. The Ireland national cricket team and the Scotland national cricket team also participated. Teams who won in the first round progressed to the second round. The winners in the second round then progressed to the quarter-final stages. Winners from the quarter-finals then progressed to the semi-finals from which the winners then went on to the final at Lord's which was held on 7 September 1991.

== Fixtures ==
=== First round ===
26 June 1991
(scorecard)

Bedfordshire; 66 all out (30 overs)	v	Worcestershire; 69/2 (12.5 overs)
Simon Davis 14; Neal Radford 7/19 (12 overs)		Tom Moody 42*; Alan Dean 2/20 (4.5 overs)

Worcestershire won by 8 wickets
Goldington Bury, Bedford
Umpires: Kevin Lyons & Tommy Wilson
Player of the match: Neal Radford (Worcestershire)

26, 27 June 1991
(scorecard)

Berkshire; 90/5 (22 overs)	v	Hampshire; 93/0 (20.2 overs)
Philip Oxley 18; Shaun Udal 2/14 (5 overs)		Robin Smith 43*

Hampshire won by 10 wickets
Sonning Lane, Reading
Umpires: Derek Dennis & Peter Wight
Player of the match: Shaun Udal (Hampshire)

- Reserve day used, match reduced to 22 overs per side

26 June 1991
(scorecard)

Devon; 149 all out (57.4 overs)	v	Essex; 150/2 (44.4 overs)
Nick Folland 55; Derek Pringle 3/21 (10 overs)		Graham Gooch 57; Keith Donohue 2/34 (12 overs)

Essex won by 8 wickets
The Maer Ground, Exmouth
Umpires: Allan Jones & Gerry Stickley
Player of the match: Nick Folland (Devon)

26 June 1991
(scorecard)

Glamorgan; 345/2 (60 overs)	v	Durham; 305/9 (60 overs)
Matthew Maynard 151 (103); Peter Heseltine 1/37 (12 overs)		John Glendenen 109 (133); Ian Smith 3/60 (9 overs)

Glamorgan won by 40 runs
Feethams Cricket Ground, Darlington
Umpires: Basher Hassan & Don Oslear
Player of the match: Matthew Maynard (Glamorgan)

26, 27 June 1991
(scorecard)

Gloucestershire; 237/7 (60 overs)	v	Norfolk; 84 all out (33.2 overs)
Jon Hardy 70; Mark Ellis 2/33 (12 overs)		Roger Finney 27; David Lawrence 5/17 (9 overs)

Gloucestershire won by 153 runs
County Ground, Bristol
Umpires: David Halfyard & Ray Julian
Player of the match: David Lawrence (Gloucestershire)

- Reserve day used

26, 27 June 1991
(scorecard)

Hertfordshire	v	Derbyshire

Match abandoned
Cricket Field Lane, Bishop's Stortford

- Reserve day used, Hertfordshire won 2-1 in bowling contest

26 June 1991
(scorecard)

Cambridgeshire; 107 all out (44.2 overs)	v	Kent; 111/4 (35.4 overs)
Nicholas Adams 44; Alan Igglesden 4/29 (9.2 overs)		Matthew Fleming 35*; Ajaz Akhtar 4/28 (12 overs)

Kent won by 6 wickets
St Lawrence Ground, Canterbury
Umpires: Paul Adams & David Constant
Player of the match: Ajaz Akhtar (Cambridgeshire)

26 June 1991
(scorecard)

Shropshire; 152/9 (60 overs)	v	Leicestershire; 156/3 (56.5 overs)
John Abrahams 53; Craig Wilkinson 3/16 (12 overs)		Tim Boon 76*; Philip Wormald 1/18 (8 overs)

Leicestershire won by 7 wickets
Grace Road, Leicester
Umpires: Barrie Leadbeater & Harold Rhodes
Player of the match: Tim Boon (Leicestershire)

26 June 1991
(scorecard)

Nottinghamshire; 306/4 (60 overs)	v	Lincolnshire; 172/8 (50.4 overs)
Tim Robinson 124; Paul McKeown 3/52 (12 overs)		Mark Fell 39; Mark Crawley 4/26 (12 overs)

Nottinghamshire won by 134 runs
Trent Bridge, Nottingham
Umpires: Dickie Bird & David Fawkner-Corbett
Player of the match: Mark Crawley (Nottinghamshire)

- To avoid returning for a reserve day, Lincolnshire conceded the match

26 June 1991
(scorecard)

Buckinghamshire; 159/8 (60 overs)	v	Somerset; 161/4 (48.4 overs)
Paul Roshier 32; Neil Mallender 3/23 (12 overs)		Peter Roebuck 63*; Stephen Burrow 1/18 (9 overs)

Somerset won by 6 wickets
Recreation Ground, Bath
Umpires: Ray Tolchard & Bob White
Player of the match: Peter Roebuck (Somerset)

26 June 1991
(scorecard)

Northamptonshire; 260/5 (60 overs)	v	Staffordshire; 108 all out (43.3 overs)
Rob Bailey 145; Nigel Hackett 3/45 (12 overs)		Paul Newman 28; Eldine Baptiste 4/27 (12 overs)

Northamptonshire won by 152 runs
Lichfield Road, Stone
Umpires: John Hampshire & Vanburn Holder
Player of the match: Rob Bailey (Northamptonshire)

26, 27 June 1991
(scorecard)

Surrey	v	Oxfordshire

Match abandoned
The Oval, London

- Reserve day used, Surrey won 3-2 in bowling contest

26 June 1991
(scorecard)

Yorkshire; 123 all out (45.1 overs)	v	Warwickshire; 124/3 (43.3 overs)
Phil Robinson 40; Allan Donald 4/16 (9 overs)		Dominic Ostler 34*; Jeremy Batty 1/17 (6 overs)

Warwickshire won by 7 wickets
Edgbaston, Birmingham
Umpires: Mervyn Kitchen & Nigel Plews
Player of the match: Allan Donald (Warwickshire)

26, 27 June 1991
(scorecard)

Middlesex; 216/9 (60 overs)	v	Ireland; 171/9 (60 overs)
Mike Gatting 65; Alan Lewis 4/47 (10 overs)		Conor Hoey 26*; Mark Ramprakash 2/15 (7 overs)

Middlesex won by 45 runs
Castle Avenue, Dublin
Umpires: Chris Balderstone & David Shepherd
Player of the match: Alan Lewis (Ireland)

- Match was scheduled for one day but extended to two.

26 June 1991
(scorecard)

Sussex; 231/9 (60 overs)	v	Scotland; 159 all out (54.5 overs)
Neil Lenham 66; Bruce Russell 2/20 (5 overs)		Richard Swan 45; Colin Wells 3/16 (12 overs)

Sussex won by 72 runs
Myreside, Edinburgh
Umpires: Graham Burgess & Barry Dudleston
Player of the match: Neil Lenham (Sussex)

=== Second round ===
11, 12 July 1991
(scorecard)

Gloucestershire; 221/6 (60 overs)	v	Nottinghamshire; 222/7 (60 overs)
Bill Athey 76; Andrew Pick 3/41 (12 overs)		Tim Robinson 48; Richard Scott 2/32 (12 overs)

Nottinghamshire won by 3 wickets
County Ground, Bristol
Umpires: John Holder & Nigel Plews
Player of the match: Bill Athey (Nottinghamshire)

- Reserve day used

11, 12 July 1991
(scorecard)

Lancashire; 261 all out (59.1 overs)	v	Hampshire; 262/2 (53.5 overs)
Graeme Fowler 71; Cardigan Connor 4/61 (11.2 overs)		Robin Smith 79*; Wasim Akram 1/46 (12 overs)

Hampshire won by 8 wickets
County Ground, Southampton
Umpires: Basher Hassan & David Shepherd
Player of the match: Robin Smith (Hampshire)

- Reserve day used

11 July 1991
(scorecard)

Leicestershire; 255/6 (60 overs)	v	Northamptonshire; 259/1 (46.5 overs)
James Whitaker 94*; Eldine Baptiste 3/45 (11 overs)		Alan Fordham 132*; Laurie Potter 1/32 (6 overs)

Northamptonshire won by 9 wickets
County Ground, Northampton
Umpires: Dickie Bird & Kevin Lyons
Player of the match: Alan Fordham (Northamptonshire)

11 July 1991
(scorecard)

Kent; 245 all out (57.2 overs)	v	Surrey; 249/3 (47.2 overs)
Trevor Ward 55; Jonathan Robinson 3/46 (12 overs)		Alec Stewart 76*; Richard Davis 1/34 (11 overs)

Surrey won by 7 wickets
The Oval, London
Umpires: Ken Palmer & Ray Tolchard
Player of the match: Jonathan Robinson (Surrey)

11 July 1991
(scorecard)

Sussex; 254/8 (60 overs)	v	Essex; 255/6 (58 overs)
David Smith 62; Don Topley 3/38 (12 overs)		Nasser Hussain 97; Adrian Jones 2/46 (7 overs)

Essex won by 4 wickets
County Ground, Hove
Umpires: David Constant & Peter Wight
Player of the match: Graham Gooch (Essex)

11 July 1991
(scorecard)

Hertfordshire; 135/7 (60 overs)	v	Warwickshire; 138/0 (36.4 overs)
David Ligertwood 37*; Dermot Reeve 2/19 (12 overs)		Jason Ratcliffe 68*

Warwickshire won by 10 wickets
Edgbaston Cricket Ground, Birmingham
Umpires: Jack Bond & Don Oslear
Player of the match: Jason Ratcliffe (Warwickshire)

11, 12 July 1991
(scorecard)

Worcestershire; 223/9 (60 overs)	v	Glamorgan; 224/3 (53.4 overs)
Steve Rhodes 41; Robert Croft 2/28 (12 overs)		Adrian Dale 86; Graham Dilley 1/35 (12 overs)

Glamorgan won by 7 wickets
New Road, Worcester
Umpires: Graham Burgess & Barrie Meyer
Player of the match: Adrian Dale (Glamorgan)

- Reserve day used

=== Quarter-finals ===
31 July 1991
(scorecard)

Nottinghamshire; 252/9 (60 overs)	v	Hampshire; 253/3 (59 overs)
Derek Randall 95; Aaqib Javed 4/51 (12 overs)		Chris Smith 105*; Mark Saxelby 1/48 (12 overs)

Hampshire won by 7 wickets
County Ground, Southampton
Umpires: Chris Balderstone & Roy Palmer
Player of the match: Chris Smith (Hampshire)

31 July 1991
(scorecard)

Northamptonshire; 254/7 (60 overs)	v	Glamorgan; 228 all out (60 overs)
Alan Fordham 71; Steve Watkin 2/40 (12 overs)		Alan Butcher 70; Paul Taylor 2/34 (12 overs)

Northamptonshire won by 26 runs
County Ground, Northampton
Umpires: Jack Bond & John Holder
Player of the match: Alan Fordham (Northamptonshire)

31 July 1991
(scorecard)

Surrey; 253 all out (59.5 overs)	v	Essex; 222 all out (56.1 overs)
David Ward 62; Graham Gooch 2/30 (8 overs)		John Stephenson 59; Waqar Younis 4/37 (10.1 overs)

Surrey won by 31 runs
The Oval, London
Umpires: John Hampshire & Bob White
Player of the match: Waqar Younis (Surrey)

31 July 1991
(scorecard)

Warwickshire; 229 all out (60 overs)	v	Somerset; 224/7 (60 overs)
Andy Lloyd 78; Andy Hayhurst 5/60 (12 overs)		Andy Hayhurst 91*; Gladstone Small 2/26 (12 overs)

Warwickshire won by 5 runs
Edgbaston Cricket Ground, Birmingham
Umpires: Kevin Lyons & Barrie Meyer
Player of the match: Andy Hayhurst (Somerset)

=== Semi-finals ===
14, 15 August 1991
(scorecard)

Surrey; 208/9 (60 overs)	v	Northamptonshire; 201 all out (59.2 overs)
Martin Bicknell 66*; David Capel 3/26 (9 overs)		Kevin Curran 38; Waqar Younis 5/40 (12 overs)

Surrey won by 7 runs
The Oval, London
Umpires: Barry Dudleston & John Harris
Player of the match: Waqar Younis (Surrey)

- Reserve day used

14 August 1991
(scorecard)

Warwickshire; 172 all out (58.5 overs)	v	Hampshire; 173/1 (50 overs)
Dermot Reeve 57*; Cardigan Connor 4/29 (12 overs)		Robin Smith 64*; Neil Smith 1/17 (8 overs)

Hampshire won by 9 wickets
Edgbaston Cricket Ground, Birmingham
Umpires: Barrie Leadbeater & Alan Whitehead
Player of the match: Paul Terry (Hampshire)

=== Final ===
7 September 1991
(scorecard)

Surrey; 240/5 (60 overs)	v	Hampshire; 243/6 (59.4 overs)
Graham Thorpe 93; Cardigan Connor 3/39 (12 overs)		Robin Smith 78; Martin Bicknell 1/32 (11.4 overs)

Hampshire won by 4 wickets
Lord's, London
Umpires: Mervyn Kitchen & Ken Palmer
Player of the match: Robin Smith (Hampshire)
