= 1992 NatWest Trophy =

- Administrator: Test and County Cricket Board
- Cricket format: Limited overs cricket (60 overs per innings)
- Tournament format: Knockout
- Champions: Northamptonshire (2nd title)
- Participants: 32
- Matches: 30
- Most runs: 239 Graham Gooch (Essex)
- Most wickets: 12 Kevin Curran (Northamptonshire)

The 1992 NatWest Trophy was the 12th NatWest Trophy. It was an English limited overs county cricket tournament which was held between 24 June and 5 September 1992. The tournament was won by Northamptonshire County Cricket Club who defeated Leicestershire County Cricket Club by 8 wickets in the final at Lord's.

== Format ==
Following the elevation of Durham to first-class status, the 18 first-class counties, were joined by twelve Minor Counties: Berkshire, Buckinghamshire, Cambridgeshire, Cheshire, Cumberland, Devon, Dorset, Norfolk, Northumberland, Oxfordshire, Shropshire and Staffordshire. The Ireland national cricket team and the Scotland national cricket team also participated. Teams who won in the first round progressed to the second round. The winners in the second round then progressed to the quarter-final stage. Winners from the quarter-finals then progressed to the semi-finals from which the winners then went on to the final at Lord's which was held on 5 September 1992.

=== First round ===
24 June 1992
(scorecard)

| Sussex; 327/6 (60 overs) | v | Buckinghamshire; 126 all out (51 overs) |
| Alan Wells 119; Gary Black 3/83 (12 overs) | | Richard Baigent 44; Franklyn Stephenson 3/8 (9 overs) |

Sussex won by 201 runs
Wilton Park, Beaconsfield
Umpires: David Constant & Brian Harrison
Player of the match: Alan Wells (Sussex)

24 June 1992
(scorecard)

| Derbyshire; 280/6 (60 overs) | v | Berkshire; 139 all out (51.5 overs) |
| Peter Bowler 111; Jefferson Jones 4/54 (12 overs) | | Philip Oxley 49; Dominic Cork 5/18 (9.5 overs) |

Derbyshire won by 141 runs
County Ground, Derby
Umpires: Jack Bond & Ray Tolchard
Player of the match: Dominic Cork (Derbyshire)

24 June 1992
(scorecard)

| Essex; 361/8 (60 overs) | v | Cumberland; 200/8 (60 overs) |
| Nasser Hussain 108; Kevin Sample 3/64 (12 overs) | | Steven Sharp 75; Don Topley 3/47 (11 overs) |

Essex won by 161 runs
County Ground, Chelmsford
Umpires: Ken Palmer & Terry Spencer
Player of the match: Nasser Hussain (Essex)

24 June 1992
(scorecard)

| Surrey; 239/6 (60 overs) | v | Glamorgan; 243/6 (59.1 overs) |
| David Ward 101*; Steve Barwick 5/26 (12 overs) | | Matthew Maynard 87; Monte Lynch 2/28 (5 overs) |

Glamorgan won by 4 wickets
St. Helen's, Swansea
Umpires: Barrie Meyer & George Sharp
Player of the match: Matthew Maynard (Glamorgan)

24 June 1992
(scorecard)

| Gloucestershire; 272/4 (60 overs) | v | Cheshire; 68 all out (34.4 overs) |
| Tony Wright 107*; Stephen Crawley 2/66 (12 overs) | | Timothy Standing 14; Courtney Walsh 6/21 (10.4 overs) |

Gloucestershire won by 204 runs
The Royal & Sun Alliance County Ground, Bristol
Umpires: Derek Dennis & Don Oslear
Player of the match: Courtney Walsh (Gloucestershire)

24 June 1992
(scorecard)

| Dorset; 218/3 (60 overs) | v | Hampshire; 219/1 (50.4 overs) |
| Graeme Calway 105 (173); Cardigan Connor 3/29 (12 overs) | | Paul Terry 108*; Andrew Wingfield Digby 1/37 (12 overs) |

Hampshire won by 9 wickets
County Ground, Southampton
Umpires: David Halfyard & Roy Palmer
Player of the match: Graeme Calway (Dorset)

24 June 1992
(scorecard)

| Kent; 266/7 (60 overs) | v | Devon; 166/8 (60 overs) |
| Mark Benson 58; Tim Ward 3/60 (9 overs) | | Steven Willis 42; Graham Cowdrey 2/4 (3 overs) |

Kent won by 100 runs
St Lawrence Ground, Canterbury
Umpires: Michael Johnson & Barrie Leadbeater
Player of the match: Matthew Fleming (Kent)

24 June 1992
(scorecard)

| Leicestershire; 293/7 (60 overs) | v | Norfolk; 161 all out (53.1 overs) |
| Phil Robinson 73; Jimmy Lewis 2/66 (12 overs) | | Carl Rogers 51; David Millns 3/22 (10 overs) |

Leicestershire won by 132 runs
Grace Road, Leicester
Umpires: Tony Clarkson & Bob White
Player of the match: Phil Robinson (Leicestershire)

24 June 1992
(scorecard)

| Northamptonshire; 234/4 (60 overs) | v | Cambridgeshire; 166/6 (60 overs) |
| Kevin Curran 78*; Bruce Roberts 1/32 (12 overs) | | Nicholas Adams 104*; Paul Taylor 2/8 (6 overs) |

Northamptonshire won by 86 runs
County Ground, Northampton
Umpires: Paul Adams & John Holder
Player of the match: Nicholas Adams (Cambridgeshire)

24 June 1992
(scorecard)

| Nottinghamshire; 307/7 (60 overs) | v | Worcestershire; 250 all out (56.4 overs) |
| Paul Johnson 78; Stuart Lampitt 2/64 (12 overs) | | Steve Rhodes 54; Kevin Evans 4/43 (10.4 overs) |

Nottinghamshire won by 57 runs
Trent Bridge, Nottingham
Umpires: Graham Burgess & John Harris
Player of the match: Chris Lewis (Nottinghamshire)

24 June 1992
(scorecard)

| Lancashire; 283/5 (60 overs) | v | Oxfordshire; 88 all out (34.1 overs) |
| Mike Atherton 109*; Jonathan Hartley 1/23 (4 overs) | | Stewart Laudat 31; Danny Morrison 3/17 (8.1 overs) |

Lancashire won by 195 runs
Christ Church Ground, Oxford
Umpires: Barry Dudleston & Harold Rhodes
Player of the match: Mike Watkinson (Lancashire)

24 June 1992
(scorecard)

| Middlesex; 294/7 (60 overs) | v | Shropshire; 149 all out (58.1 overs) |
| Mike Roseberry 112; Giles Toogood 6/47 (12 overs) | | Michael Davidson 42; Dean Headley 5/20 (8.1 overs) |

Middlesex won by 145 runs
St George's Cricket Ground, Telford
Umpires: David Fawkner-Corbett & Peter Wight
Player of the match: Giles Toogood (Shropshire)

24 June 1992
(scorecard)

| Scotland; 245/2 (60 overs) | v | Somerset; 246/2 (56.5 overs) |
| Ian Philip 102*; Neil Mallender 1/47 (12 overs) | | Richard Harden 108*; Peter Duthie 1/32 (9 overs) |

Somerset won by 8 wickets
County Ground, Taunton
Umpires: Vanburn Holder & Ray Julian
Player of the match: Richard Harden (Somerset)

24 June 1992
(scorecard)

| Staffordshire; 172/9 (60 overs) | v | Warwickshire; 173/2 (39.4 overs) |
| Simon Myles 60; Allan Donald 5/28 (12 overs) | | Roger Twose 107*; Simon Myles 1/15 (3.4 overs) |

Warwickshire won by 8 wickets
Edgbaston, Birmingham
Umpires: Mervyn Kitchen & Gerry Stickley
Player of the match: Allan Donald (Warwickshire)

24 June 1992
(scorecard)

| Northumberland; 137 all out (56.4 overs) | v | Yorkshire; 138/2 (51.3 overs) |
| Graeme Morris 47; Mark Robinson 3/18 (11.4 overs) | | Simon Kellett 38; Stephen Greensword 2/22 (12 overs) |

Yorkshire won by 8 wickets
Headingley, Leeds
Umpires: Alan Whitehead & Tommy Wilson
Player of the match: Graeme Morris (Northumberland)

24 June 1992
(scorecard)

| Durham; 305/6 (60 overs) | v | Ireland; 116 all out (37.2 overs) |
| Wayne Larkins 113 (133); Angus Dunlop 3/45 (8 overs) | | Junior McBrine 30 (24); Steven McEwan 4/41 (12 overs) |

Durham won by 189 runs
Castle Avenue, Dublin
Umpires: Chris Balderstone & David Shepherd
Player of the match: Steven McEwan (Durham)

=== Second round ===
9, 10 July 1992
(scorecard)

| Leicestershire; 201/9 (60 overs) | v | Derbyshire; 103 all out (30.3 overs) |
| Phil Robinson 40; Dominic Cork 3/36 (12 overs) | | Chris Adams 30; Winston Benjamin 5/32 (10.3 overs) |

Leicestershire won by 98 runs
County Ground, Derby
Umpires: Nigel Plews & George Sharp
Player of the match: David Millns (Leicestershire)

- Match was scheduled for one day but extended to two.

9 July 1992
(scorecard)

| Lancashire; 318/8 (60 overs) | v | Essex; 319/9 (59.5 overs) |
| Graeme Fowler 66; John Stephenson 3/78 (12 overs) | | John Stephenson 75; Mike Watkinson 2/39 (12 overs) |

Essex won by 1 wicket
County Ground, Chelmsford
Umpires: Bob White & Peter Wight
Player of the match: Mike Garnham (Essex)

9 July 1992
(scorecard)

| Hampshire; 243/9 (60 overs) | v | Kent; 244/8 (59.1 overs) |
| Paul Terry 109 (177); Matthew Fleming 3/34 (9 overs) | | Trevor Ward 92 (144); Cardigan Connor 3/37 (11.1 overs) |

Kent won by 2 wickets
County Ground, Southampton
Umpires: Graham Burgess & Mervyn Kitchen
Player of the match: Mark Ealham (Kent)

9 July 1992
(scorecard)

| Middlesex; 259/8 (60 overs) | v | Durham; 260/4 (58.3 overs) |
| Mike Gatting 57 (82); Simon Hughes 4/41 (12 overs) | | Paul Parker 69 (138); Angus Fraser 1/45 (12 overs) |

Durham won by 6 wickets
Uxbridge Cricket Club Ground, Uxbridge
Umpires: Dickie Bird & Barry Dudleston
Player of the match: Paul Parker (Durham)

9 July 1992
(scorecard)

| Northamptonshire; 325/7 (60 overs) | v | Yorkshire; 192 all out (50.3 overs) |
| Alan Fordham 78; Paul Jarvis 2/53 (12 overs) | | Richard Blakey 64; Curtly Ambrose 4/7 (8.3 overs) |

Northamptonshire won by 133 runs
County Ground, Northampton
Umpires: Jack Bond & Vanburn Holder
Player of the match: Curtly Ambrose (Northamptonshire)

9, 10 July 1992
(scorecard)

| Nottinghamshire; 194 all out (59.3 overs) | v | Glamorgan; 197/8 (60 overs) |
| Chris Cairns 77; Steve Watkin 3/21 (12 overs) | | Matthew Maynard 60; Michael Field-Buss 3/23 (12 overs) |

Glamorgan won by 2 wickets
Trent Bridge, Nottingham
Umpires: John Hampshire & Ray Tolchard
Player of the match: Steve Watkin (Glamorgan)

- Match was scheduled for one day but extended to two.

9 July 1992
(scorecard)

| Gloucestershire; 235 all out (59.4 overs) | v | Somerset; 213 all out (55.4 overs) |
| Tony Wright 71; Andy Caddick 6/30 (12 overs) | | Mark Lathwell 85; Courtney Walsh 4/34 (11.4 overs) |

Gloucestershire won by 22 runs
County Ground, Taunton
Umpires: Chris Balderstone & Gerry Stickley
Player of the match: Andy Caddick (Somerset)

9, 10 July 1992
(scorecard)

| Sussex; 150 all out (54 overs) | v | Warwickshire; 151/7 (53.3 overs) |
| Alan Wells 47*; Roger Twose 3/39 (12 overs) | | Andy Lloyd 40; Tony Pigott 3/31 (12 overs) |

Warwickshire won by 3 wickets
Edgbaston, Birmingham
Umpires: John Holder & Ray Julian
Player of the match: Roger Twose (Warwickshire)

- Match was scheduled for one day but extended to two.

=== Quarter-finals ===
29 July 1992
(scorecard)

| Northamptonshire; 224/8 (60 overs) | v | Glamorgan; 141 all out (51.1 overs) |
| Rob Bailey 98*; Steve Barwick 2/36 (12 overs) | | Matthew Maynard 41; David Capel 3/21 (12 overs) |

Northamptonshire won by 83 runs
St. Helen's, Swansea
Umpires: Barry Dudleston & Allan Jones
Player of the match: Rob Bailey (Northamptonshire)

29 July 1992
(scorecard)

| Gloucestershire; 236/7 (60 overs) | v | Essex; 240/4 (57.1 overs) |
| Bill Athey 59; John Stephenson 2/42 (10 overs) | | Graham Gooch 105*; Mark Alleyne 1/22 (9 overs) |

Essex won by 6 wickets
College Ground, Cheltenham
Umpires: John Hampshire & John Harris
Player of the match: Graham Gooch (Essex)

29 July 1992
(scorecard)

| Leicestershire; 249 all out (59.3 overs) | v | Durham; 204 all out (55.5 overs) |
| James Whitaker 63 (133); Simon Hughes 3/34 (12 overs) | | Paul Parker 54 (72); Vince Wells 3/38 (8.5 overs) |

Leicestershire won by 45 runs
Grace Road, Leicester
Umpires: Dickie Bird & Barrie Leadbeater
Player of the match: Justin Benson (Leicestershire)

29 July 1992
(scorecard)

| Warwickshire; 224 all out (60 overs) | v | Kent; 161 all out (52.5 overs) |
| Andy Moles 76; Matthew Fleming 2/10 (2 overs) | | Mark Benson 57; Gladstone Small 3/28 (12 overs) |

Warwickshire won by 63 runs
Edgbaston, Birmingham
Umpires: Roy Palmer & Alan Whitehead
Player of the match: Gladstone Small (Warwickshire)

=== Semi-finals ===
12, 13 August 1992
(scorecard)

| Essex; 226/8 (60 overs) | v | Leicestershire; 229/5 (59.5 overs) |
| Paul Prichard 87; Winston Benjamin 3/40 (12 overs) | | Nigel Briers 88; Mark Ilott 2/36 (12 overs) |

Leicestershire won by 5 wickets
Grace Road, Leicester
Umpires: Don Oslear & Nigel Plews
Player of the match: Nigel Briers (Leicestershire)

- Match was scheduled for one day but extended to two.

12, 13 August 1992
(scorecard)

| Warwickshire; 149 all out (59.2 overs) | v | Northamptonshire; 152/7 (55.5 overs) |
| Gladstone Small 23; Curtly Ambrose 2/21 (11.2 overs) | | Nigel Felton 58; Dermot Reeve 2/29 (12 overs) |

Northamptonshire won by 3 wickets
Edgbaston, Birmingham
Umpires: Barrie Meyer & Ken Palmer
Player of the match: Nigel Felton (Northamptonshire)

- Match was scheduled for one day but extended to two.

=== Final ===
5 September 1992
(scorecard)

| Leicestershire; 208/7 (60 overs) | v | Northamptonshire; 211/2 (49.4 overs) |
| James Whitaker 84 (160); Kevin Curran 3/41 (12 overs) | | Alan Fordham 91 (141); Alan Mullally 2/22 (10 overs) |

Northamptonshire won by 8 wickets
Lord's, London
Umpires: David Constant & David Shepherd
Player of the match: Alan Fordham (Northamptonshire)
