= 1993 NatWest Trophy =

- Administrator: Test and County Cricket Board
- Cricket format: Limited overs cricket (60 overs per innings)
- Tournament format: Knockout
- Champions: Warwickshire (4th title)
- Participants: 32
- Matches: 31
- Most runs: 336 Matthew Maynard (Glamorgan)
- Most wickets: 9 Franklyn Stephenson (Sussex)

The 1993 NatWest Trophy was the 13th NatWest Trophy. It was an English limited overs county cricket tournament which was held between 22 June and 4 September 1993. The tournament was won by Warwickshire County Cricket Club who defeated Sussex County Cricket Club by 5 wickets in the final at Lord's.

== Format ==
The 18 first-class counties, were joined by twelve Minor Counties: Buckinghamshire, Cheshire, Devon, Dorset, Hertfordshire, Norfolk, Oxfordshire, Shropshire, Staffordshire, Suffolk, Wales Minor Counties and Wiltshire. The Ireland national cricket team and the Scotland national cricket team also participated. Teams who won in the first round progressed to the second round. The winners in the second round then progressed to the quarter-final stage. Winners from the quarter-finals then progressed to the semi-finals from which the winners then went on to the final at Lord's which was held on 4 September 1993.

=== First round ===
22 June 1993
(scorecard)

Leicestershire; 289/9 (60 overs)	v	Buckinghamshire; 214/8 (60 overs)
Tim Boon 117; Timothy Barry 2/43 (9 overs)		Stephen Burrow 47*; Justin Benson 3/13 (2 overs)

Leicestershire won by 75 runs
Pound Lane, Marlow
Umpires: Michael Johnson & Roy Palmer
Player of the match: Tim Boon (Leicestershire)

22 June 1993
(scorecard)

Nottinghamshire; 208/9 (60 overs)	v	Cheshire; 146 all out (55.3 overs)
Chris Cairns 64; John O'Brien 3/45 (11 overs)		Ian Cockbain 57; Chris Cairns 4/18 (9.3 overs)

Nottinghamshire won by 62 runs
Walton Lea Road, Walton
Umpires: Graham Burgess & Vanburn Holder
Player of the match: Chris Cairns (Nottinghamshire)

22 June 1993
(scorecard)

Derbyshire; 266/7 (60 overs)	v	Devon; 133 all out (43.4 overs)
Tim O'Gorman 68*; Peter Roebuck 3/37 (12 overs)		Keith Donohue 31; Dominic Cork 4/18 (8 overs)

Derbyshire won by 133 runs
The Maer Ground, Exmouth
Umpires: David Halfyard & Peter Wight
Player of the match: Dominic Cork (Derbyshire)

22 June 1993
(scorecard)

Glamorgan; 322/5 (60 overs)	v	Oxfordshire; 191/5 (60 overs)
Viv Richards 162*; Graham Savin 1/42 (9 overs)		David Wise 68; Adrian Dale 2/49 (12 overs)

Glamorgan won by 131 runs
St. Helen's, Swansea
Umpires: Derek Dennis & Barrie Meyer
Player of the match: Viv Richards (Glamorgan)

22 June 1993
(scorecard)

Gloucestershire; 274/9 (60 overs)	v	Hertfordshire; 164 all out (57.5 overs)
Mark Alleyne 73; Kafeel Jahangir 4/57 (12 overs)		Mark Gouldstone 68*; Tim Hancock 2/7 (1.5 overs)

Gloucestershire won by 110 runs
The Royal & Sun Alliance County Ground, Bristol
Umpires: John Harris & Alan Whitehead
Player of the match: Mark Alleyne (Gloucestershire)

22 June 1993
(scorecard)

Kent; 282/7 (60 overs)	v	Middlesex; 116 all out (36 overs)
Carl Hooper 62; John Emburey 3/59 (12 overs)		Desmond Haynes 41; Martin McCague 5/26 (12 overs)

Kent won by 166 runs
St Lawrence Ground, Canterbury
Umpires: Ken Palmer & Gerry Stickley
Player of the match: Martin McCague (Kent)

22 June 1993
(scorecard)

Warwickshire; 285/9 (60 overs)	v	Norfolk; 142 all out (53.3 overs)
Dominic Ostler 104; David Thomas 3/34 (8 overs)		Steve Goldsmith 32; Neil Smith 5/17 (12 overs)

Warwickshire won by 143 runs
County Ground, Norwich
Umpires: John Holder & Harold Rhodes
Player of the match: Dominic Ostler (Warwickshire)

22 June 1993
(scorecard)

Lancashire; 178/7 (60 overs)	v	Northamptonshire; 181/4 (56.5 overs)
Mike Watkinson 60*; Tony Penberthy 2/33 (12 overs)		Rob Bailey 96*; Alex Barnett 2/29 (12 overs)

Northamptonshire won by 6 wickets
County Ground, Northampton
Umpires: Dickie Bird & Allan Jones
Player of the match: Rob Bailey (Northamptonshire)

22 June 1993
(scorecard)

Somerset; 301/4 (60 overs)	v	Shropshire; 185 all out (59.4 overs)
Mark Lathwell 103; Brian Shantry 2/36 (7 overs)		Bryan Jones 66; Graham Rose 3/11 (6 overs)

Somerset won by 116 runs
St George's Cricket Ground, Telford
Umpires: Bob White & Peter Willey
Player of the match: Mark Lathwell (Somerset)

22 June 1993
(scorecard)

Staffordshire; 165 all out (59.1 overs)	v	Hampshire; 166/3 (44.5 overs)
Steven Dean 40; Cardigan Connor 3/21 (12 overs)		Robin Smith 105*; Paul Newman 1/36 (8 overs)

Hampshire won by 7 wickets
Lichfield Road, Stone
Umpires: Tony Clarkson & Barrie Leadbeater
Player of the match: Robin Smith (Hampshire)

22 June 1993
(scorecard)

Essex; 251/9 (60 overs)	v	Suffolk; 130 all out (48.2 overs)
John Stephenson 84; Ian Graham 4/66 (12 overs)		Philip Caley 54*; Saleem Malik 4/25 (6.2 overs)

Essex won by 121 runs
Victory Ground, Bury St Edmunds
Umpires: Paul Adams & Chris Balderstone
Player of the match: Saleem Malik (Essex)

22 June 1993
(scorecard)

Dorset; 163 all out (58.5 overs)	v	Surrey; 164/0 (28.4 overs)
Jon Hardy 73; Martin Bicknell 3/26 (12 overs)		Alec Stewart 104*

Surrey won by 10 wickets
The Oval, London
Umpires: John Hampshire & Martin Reed
Player of the match: Alec Stewart (Surrey)

22 June 1993
(scorecard)

Sussex; 257/7 (60 overs)	v	Wales Minor Counties; 143/6 (60 overs)
Keith Greenfield 96*; Adrian Griffiths 3/57 (12 overs)		Barry Metcalf 30; Ian Salisbury 2/17 (8 overs)

Sussex won by 114 runs
County Ground, Hove
Umpires: Trevor Jesty & Nigel Plews
Player of the match: Keith Greenfield (Sussex)

22 June 1993
(scorecard)

Durham; 320/5 (60 overs)	v	Wiltshire; 217/8 (60 overs)
Stewart Hutton 95 (107); Neil Prigent 2/38 (12 overs)		Lawrence Smith 73 (112); Simon Hughes 3/29 (11 overs)

Durham won by 103 runs
Trowbridge Cricket Club Ground, Trowbridge
Umpires: Don Oslear & George Sharp
Player of the match: Stewart Hutton (Durham)

22 June 1993
(scorecard)

Yorkshire; 274/4 (60 overs)	v	Ireland; 187/5 (60 overs)
Ashley Metcalfe 77; Paul McCrum 2/51 (10 overs)		Stephen Warke 64; Peter Hartley 2/25 (9 overs)

Yorkshire won by 85 runs
Headingley, Leeds
Umpires: Barry Dudleston & Terry Spencer
Player of the match: Ashley Metcalfe (Yorkshire)

22 June 1993
(scorecard)

Worcestershire; 238/8 (60 overs)	v	Scotland; 162/7 (60 overs)
Graeme Hick 51; Gavin Hamilton 3/29 (12 overs)		Alastair Storie 32; Stuart Lampitt 3/23 (12 overs)

Worcestershire won by 76 runs
Myreside, Edinburgh
Umpires: Jack Bond & Tommy Wilson
Player of the match: Graeme Hick (Worcestershire)

=== Second round ===
7 July 1993
(scorecard)

Essex; 286/5 (60 overs)	v	Northamptonshire; 290/5 (57.5 overs)
Paul Prichard 92; Curtly Ambrose 2/47 (12 overs)		Allan Lamb 124*; Steve Andrew 1/25 (4 overs)

Northamptonshire won by 5 wickets
County Ground, Chelmsford
Umpires: Graham Burgess & Don Oslear
Player of the match: Allan Lamb (Northamptonshire)

7 July 1993
(scorecard)

Durham; 245/5 (60 overs)	v	Glamorgan; 248/3 (57.1 overs)
Wayne Larkins 75 (138); Roland Lefebvre 2/31 (12 overs)		Matthew Maynard 101 (104); Philip Berry 2/35 (7 overs)

Glamorgan won by 7 wickets
Sophia Gardens, Cardiff
Umpires: David Constant & John Harris
Player of the match: Matthew Maynard (Glamorgan)

7 July 1993
(scorecard)

Gloucestershire; 241/3 (60 overs)	v	Yorkshire; 243/8 (59.4 overs)
Chris Broad 114*; Darren Gough 3/31 (10 overs)		Richie Richardson 90; Mark Alleyne 3/48 (10 overs)

Yorkshire won by 2 wickets
The Royal & Sun Alliance County Ground, Bristol
Umpires: Ray Julian & Peter Willey
Player of the match: Chris Broad (Gloucestershire)

7 July 1993
(scorecard)

Leicestershire; 129 all out (46.5 overs)	v	Surrey; 131/3 (32.1 overs)
Tim Boon 45; Waqar Younis 3/18 (7.5 overs)		Alec Stewart 56; Laurie Potter 2/40 (12 overs)

Surrey won by 7 wickets
Grace Road, Leicester
Umpires: Vanburn Holder & Peter Wight
Player of the match: Andrew Smith (Surrey)

7 July 1993
(scorecard)

Nottinghamshire; 203 all out (55.4 overs)	v	Somerset; 204/7 (57.5 overs)
Chris Cairns 71; Neil Mallender 3/33 (10.4 overs)		Nick Folland 63; Chris Lewis 3/24 (11 overs)

Somerset won by 3 wickets
Trent Bridge, Nottingham
Umpires: Nigel Plews & Gerry Stickley
Player of the match: Chris Cairns (Nottinghamshire)

7 July 1993
(scorecard)

Hampshire; 248/4 (60 overs)	v	Sussex; 252/1 (58.5 overs)
Robin Smith 104*; Franklyn Stephenson 3/52 (12 overs)		David Smith 123; Cardigan Connor 1/59 (11.5 overs)

Sussex won by 9 wickets
County Ground, Hove
Umpires: Allan Jones & George Sharp
Player of the match: David Smith (Sussex)

7 July 1993
(scorecard)

Kent; 262/9 (60 overs)	v	Warwickshire; 265/5 (59.3 overs)
Mark Ealham 58*; Allan Donald 4/69 (11 overs)		Dermot Reeve 72*; Mark Ealham 1/38 (12 overs)

Warwickshire won by 5 wickets
Edgbaston, Birmingham
Umpires: David Shepherd & Alan Whitehead
Player of the match: Dermot Reeve (Warwickshire)

7 July 1993
(scorecard)

Derbyshire; 244/9 (60 overs)	v	Worcestershire; 245/6 (57.2 overs)
Chris Adams 93; Chris Tolley 3/25 (9 overs)		Tim Curtis 82; Ole Mortensen 1/31 (12 overs)

Worcestershire won by 4 wickets
New Road, Worcester
Umpires: Mervyn Kitchen & Barrie Leadbeater
Player of the match: Tim Curtis (Worcestershire)

=== Quarter-finals ===
28, 29 July 1993
(scorecard)

Glamorgan; 279/9 (60 overs)	v	Worcestershire; 175 all out (50.5 overs)
Matthew Maynard 84; Neal Radford 3/55 (12 overs)		Phil Weston 25; Adrian Dale 3/54 (12 overs)

Glamorgan won by 104 runs
St. Helen's, Swansea
Umpires: Ray Julian & Barrie Meyer
Player of the match: Matthew Maynard (Glamorgan)

- Match was scheduled for one day but extended to two.

28, 29 July 1993
(scorecard)

Sussex; 230/9 (60 overs)	v	Northamptonshire; 190 all out (55.2 overs)
David Smith 47; Nick Cook 3/53 (12 overs)		Allan Lamb 71; Ed Giddins 2/21 (10 overs)

Sussex won by 40 runs
County Ground, Northampton
Umpires: Roy Palmer & David Shepherd
Player of the match: Franklyn Stephenson (Sussex)

- Match was scheduled for one day but extended to two.

28, 29 July 1993
(scorecard)

Somerset; 230/9 (60 overs)	v	Surrey; 187 all out (56.5 overs)
Mushtaq Ahmed 35; Martin Bicknell 3/35 (12 overs)		Graham Thorpe 58; Andy Caddick 5/30 (10.5 overs)

Somerset won by 43 runs
County Ground, Taunton
Umpires: Jack Bond & John Hampshire
Player of the match: Mushtaq Ahmed (Somerset)

- Match was scheduled for one day but extended to two.

28, 29 July 1993
(scorecard)

Warwickshire; 245 all out (59.4 overs)	v	Yorkshire; 224 all out (59.2 overs)
Jason Ratcliffe 105; Darren Gough 3/31 (11.4 overs)		Richard Blakey 75; Paul Smith 4/37 (11.2 overs)

Warwickshire won by 21 runs
Headingley, Leeds
Umpires: John Holder & Bob White
Player of the match: Jason Ratcliffe (Warwickshire)

- Match was scheduled for one day but extended to two.

=== Semi-finals ===
10 August 1993
(scorecard)

Warwickshire; 252/8 (60 overs)	v	Somerset; 200 all out (56.3 overs)
Dominic Ostler 58; Andre van Troost 3/57 (12 overs)		Nick Folland 61; Dermot Reeve 3/37 (12 overs)

Warwickshire won by 52 runs
County Ground, Taunton
Umpires: David Constant & Barry Dudleston
Player of the match: Dominic Ostler (Warwickshire)

10 August 1993
(scorecard)

Glamorgan; 220 all out (60 overs)	v	Sussex; 224/7 (59.2 overs)
Matthew Maynard 84; Tony Pigott 3/23 (9 overs)		Alan Wells 106*; Steve Watkin 3/43 (12 overs)

Sussex won by 3 wickets
County Ground, Hove
Umpires: Chris Balderstone & Ken Palmer
Player of the match: Alan Wells (Sussex)

=== Final ===
4 September 1993
(scorecard)

Sussex; 321/6 (60 overs)	v	Warwickshire; 322/5 (60 overs)
David Smith 124; Dermot Reeve 2/60 (12 overs)		Asif Din 104; Franklyn Stephenson 2/51 (12 overs)

Warwickshire won by 5 wickets
Lord's, London
Umpires: Dickie Bird & Mervyn Kitchen
Player of the match: Asif Din (Warwickshire)
