= 1994 NatWest Trophy =

- Administrator: Test and County Cricket Board
- Cricket format: Limited overs cricket (60 overs per innings)
- Tournament format: Knockout
- Champions: Worcestershire (1st title)
- Participants: 32
- Matches: 31
- Most runs: 350 Tom Moody (Worcestershire)
- Most wickets: 11 Phil Newport (Worcestershire)

The 1994 NatWest Trophy was the 14th NatWest Trophy. It was an English limited overs county cricket tournament which was held between 21 June and 3 September 1994. The tournament was won by Worcestershire County Cricket Club who defeated Warwickshire County Cricket Club by 8 wickets in the final at Lord's.

== Format ==
The 18 first-class counties, were joined by twelve Minor Counties: Bedfordshire, Berkshire, Cambridgeshire, Cheshire, Cumberland, Devon, Lincolnshire, Norfolk, Northumberland, Oxfordshire, Staffordshire and Wales Minor Counties. The Ireland national cricket team and the Scotland national cricket team also participated. Teams who won in the first round progressed to the second round. The winners in the second round then progressed to the quarter-final stage. Winners from the quarter-finals then progressed to the semi-finals from which the winners then went on to the final at Lord's which was held on 3 September 1994.

=== First round ===
21 June 1994
(scorecard)

Kent; 384/6 (60 overs)	v	Berkshire; 241/5 (60 overs)
Carl Hooper 136*; Philip Oxley 5/87 (12 overs)		Julian Wood 88; Neil Taylor 3/38 (8 overs)

Kent won by 143 runs
Memorial Ground, Finchampstead
Umpires: David Shepherd & John Steele
Player of the match: Carl Hooper (Kent)

21 June 1994
(scorecard)

Cambridgeshire; 107 all out (57.1 overs)	v	Hampshire; 110/1 (31.1 overs)
Nadeem Mohammed 17; Cardigan Connor 4/11 (11.1 overs)		Robin Smith 59*; Ajaz Akhtar 1/28 (8 overs)

Hampshire won by 9 wickets
The Avenue Sports Club Ground, March
Umpires: Alan Whitehead & Peter Willey
Player of the match: Cardigan Connor (Hampshire)

21, 22 June 1994
(scorecard)

Cheshire; 107/9 (47 overs)	v	Durham; 108/5 (33.1 overs)
Jonathan Gray 51 (126); Simon Brown 5/22 (10 overs)		Wayne Larkins 34 (68); Geoff Miller 2/29 (9.1 overs)

Durham won by 5 wickets
South Downs Road, Bowdon, Greater Manchester
Umpires: Ken Palmer & Martin Reed
Player of the match: Simon Brown (Durham)

- Match was scheduled for one day but extended to two. Match was reduced before play started to 47 overs per side.

21, 22 June 1994
(scorecard)

Cumberland; 188/7 (60 overs)	v	Leicestershire; 192/3 (50.2 overs)
Steve O'Shaughnessy 40; Phil Simmons 3/31 (12 overs)		James Whitaker 73*; David Makinson 1/26 (9 overs)

Leicestershire won by 7 wickets
Netherfield Cricket Club Ground, Kendal
Umpires: Tony Clarkson & Barry Dudleston
Player of the match: Ben Smith (Leicestershire)

- Match was scheduled for one day but extended to two.

21, 22 June 1994
(scorecard)

Devon; 242/5 (60 overs)	v	Yorkshire; 246/6 (59.2 overs)
Peter Roebuck 83; Craig White 1/25 (5 overs)		Craig White 65*; Orlando le Fleming 2/42 (12 overs)

Yorkshire won by 4 wickets
The Maer Ground, Exmouth
Umpires: Graham Burgess & David Halfyard
Player of the match: Peter Roebuck (Devon)

- Match was scheduled for one day but extended to two.

21, 22 June 1994
(scorecard)

Glamorgan; 344/5 (60 overs)	v	Lincolnshire; 184/9 (60 overs)
Steve James 123; Peter Hacker 2/65 (12 overs)		Stephen Warman 39; Robert Croft 3/30 (12 overs)

Glamorgan won by 160 runs
St. Helens, Swansea
Umpires: David Constant & Michael Johnson
Player of the match: Steve James (Glamorgan)

- Match was scheduled for one day but extended to two.

21, 22 June 1994
(scorecard)

Gloucestershire; 228/8 (60 overs)	v	Derbyshire; 229/7 (59.2 overs)
Robert Dawson 60; Phil DeFreitas 2/41 (12 overs)		Kim Barnett 113*; Kevin Cooper 2/30 (12 overs)

Derbyshire won by 3 wickets
The Royal & Sun Alliance County Ground, Bristol
Umpires: Trevor Jesty & Ray Julian
Player of the match: Kim Barnett (Derbyshire)

- Match was scheduled for one day but extended to two.

21, 22 June 1994
(scorecard)

Scotland; 178/9 (60 overs)	v	Lancashire; 179/5 (53.3 overs)
George Reifer 72; Ian Austin 2/29 (12 overs)		Mike Atherton 50; Gavin Hamilton 2/42 (11 overs)

Lancashire won by 5 wickets
Old Trafford, Manchester
Umpires: Derek Dennis & John Hampshire
Player of the match: George Reifer (Scotland)

- Match was scheduled for one day but extended to two.

21, 22 June 1994
(scorecard)

Worcestershire; 309/8 (60 overs)	v	Norfolk; 172 all out (56.4 overs)
Gavin Haynes 98; Adam Cole 2/55 (12 overs)		Steve Plumb 57; David Leatherdale 3/14 (6.4 overs)

Worcestershire won by 137 runs
County Ground, Norwich
Umpires: Paul Adams & Barrie Meyer
Player of the match: Gavin Haynes (Worcestershire)

- Match was scheduled for one day but extended to two.

21, 22 June 1994
(scorecard)

Ireland; 182/6 (60 overs)	v	Northamptonshire; 183/3 (55.1 overs)
Stephen Smyth 61; Curtly Ambrose 2/17 (12 overs)		Russell Warren 100*; M. V. Narasimha Rao 2/31 (12 overs)

Northamptonshire won by 7 wickets
County Ground, Northampton
Umpires: Chris Balderstone & Barrie Leadbeater
Player of the match: Russell Warren (Northamptonshire)

- Match was scheduled for one day but extended to two.

21, 22 June 1994
(scorecard)

Nottinghamshire; 344/6 (60 overs)	v	Northumberland; 116 all out (39 overs)
Paul Johnson 146; Craig Stanley 2/66 (12 overs)		Graeme Morris 29; Kevin Evans 6/10 (7 overs)

Nottinghamshire won by 228 runs
Osborne Avenue, Jesmond
Umpires: Jack Bond & Tommy Wilson
Player of the match: Paul Johnson (Nottinghamshire)

- Match was scheduled for one day but extended to two.

21, 22 June 1994
(scorecard)

Staffordshire; 165/8 (60 overs)	v	Surrey; 166/1 (38.4 overs)
Simon Myles 71; Joey Benjamin 3/26 (12 overs)		Graham Thorpe 85*; Nigel Hackett 1/30 (10 overs)

Surrey won by 9 wickets
The Oval, London
Umpires: Allan Jones & Bob White
Player of the match: Graham Thorpe (Surrey)

- Match was scheduled for one day but extended to two.

21, 22 June 1994
(scorecard)

Essex; 272/5 (60 overs)	v	Sussex; 256 all out (59.2 overs)
Graham Gooch 86; Ed Giddins 2/56 (12 overs)		Neil Lenham 82*; Ronnie Irani 4/59 (12 overs)

Essex won by 16 runs
County Ground, Hove
Umpires: Mervyn Kitchen & Roy Palmer
Player of the match: Ronnie Irani (Essex)

- Match was scheduled for one day but extended to two.

21, 22 June 1994
(scorecard)

Wales Minor Counties; 104 all out (53.3 overs)	v	Middlesex; 108/1 (16.2 overs)
Steffan Jones 26; Kevin Shine 3/31 (12 overs)		Desmond Haynes 64*; Adrian Griffiths 1/30 (5 overs)

Middlesex won by 9 wickets
Northop Hall Cricket Club Ground, Northop
Umpires: Kevin Lyons & Terry Spencer
Player of the match: Keith Brown (Middlesex)

- Match was scheduled for one day but extended to two.

21, 22 June 1994
(scorecard)

Somerset; 349/4 (60 overs)	v	Oxfordshire; 130 all out (43 overs)
Marcus Trescothick 116; Phillip Garner 1/37 (7 overs)		Patrick Jobson 30; Andre van Troost 5/22 (9 overs)

Somerset won by 219 runs
Butt's Way, Aston Rowant
Umpires: Dickie Bird & George Sharp
Player of the match: Marcus Trescothick (Somerset)

- Match was scheduled for one day but extended to two.

21, 22 June 1994
(scorecard)

Warwickshire; 361/8 (60 overs)	v	Bedfordshire; 164 all out (56.3 overs)
Roger Twose 110; Chris Bullen 3/58 (10 overs)		Jonathan Robinson 67; Paul Smith 2/13 (6 overs)

Warwickshire won by 197 runs
Edgbaston, Birmingham
Umpires: John Holder & Peter Wight
Player of the match: Roger Twose (Warwickshire)

- Match was scheduled for one day but extended to two.

=== Second round ===
6, 7 July 1994
(scorecard)

Durham; 278 all out (60 overs)	v	Derbyshire; 280/6 (58.1 overs)
Phil Bainbridge 85 (113); Dominic Cork 5/43 (11 overs)		Tim O'Gorman 89 (170); Andy Cummins 4/48 (12 overs)

Derbyshire won by 4 wickets
Feethams, Darlington
Umpires: Graham Burgess & Don Oslear
Player of the match: Tim O'Gorman (Derbyshire)

- Match was scheduled for one day but extended to two.

6, 7 July 1994
(scorecard)

Glamorgan; 316/8 (60 overs)	v	Essex; 240/9 (60 overs)
Matthew Maynard 78; Michael Kasprowicz 5/60 (12 overs)		Nadeem Shahid 85*; Roland Lefebvre 3/28 (12 overs)

Glamorgan won by 76 runs
Sophia Gardens, Cardiff
Umpires: Jack Bond & Peter Willey
Player of the match: Ottis Gibson (Glamorgan)

- Match was scheduled for one day but extended to two.

6 July 1994
(scorecard)

Hampshire; 187 all out (59.1 overs)	v	Kent; 188/6 (46.5 overs)
Mark Nicholas 62; Dean Headley 3/44 (12 overs)		Trevor Ward 42; Kevan James 3/36 (10 overs)

Kent won by 4 wickets
County Ground, Southampton
Umpires: Dickie Bird & Barry Dudleston
Player of the match: Mark Nicholas (Hampshire)

6, 7 July 1994
(scorecard)

Warwickshire; 296/6 (60 overs)	v	Leicestershire; 168 all out (47.3 overs)
Trevor Penney 65*; Alan Mullally 2/35 (12 overs)		Tim Boon 55; Neil Smith 3/28 (11.3 overs)

Warwickshire won by 128 runs
Grace Road, Leicester
Umpires: Graham Burgess & Bob White
Player of the match: Trevor Penney (Warwickshire)

- Match was scheduled for one day but extended to two.

6 July 1994
(scorecard)

Middlesex; 259/6 (60 overs)	v	Northamptonshire; 262/3 (54 overs)
Mike Roseberry 67; Curtly Ambrose 2/26 (12 overs)		Allan Lamb 129*; Mark Feltham 1/45 (10 overs)

Northamptonshire won by 7 wickets
Uxbridge Cricket Club Ground, Uxbridge
Umpires: Mervyn Kitchen & Nigel Plews
Player of the match: Allan Lamb (Northamptonshire)

6 July 1994
(scorecard)

Surrey; 343/6 (60 overs)	v	Lancashire; 218 all out (49.3 overs)
Graham Thorpe 145*; Peter Martin 3/63 (12 overs)		Ian Austin 57; Cameron Cuffy 4/34 (11 overs)

Surrey won by 125 runs
The Oval, London
Umpires: John Harris & Ray Julian
Player of the match: Graham Thorpe (Surrey)

6, 7 July 1994
(scorecard)

Worcestershire; 263/6 (60 overs)	v	Nottinghamshire; 174 all out (52.4 overs)
Graeme Hick 97; Andrew Pick 2/45 (11 overs)		Paul Johnson 37; Phil Newport 3/44 (12 overs)

Worcestershire won by 89 runs
New Road, Worcester
Umpires: David Constant & Trevor Jesty
Player of the match: Graeme Hick (Worcestershire)

- Match was scheduled for one day but extended to two.

6, 7 July 1994
(scorecard)

Yorkshire; 215 all out (59.5 overs)	v	Somerset; 216/7 (59.5 overs)
David Byas 71; Andy Hayhurst 4/29 (6.5 overs)		Richard Harden 64; Darren Gough 3/51 (12 overs)

Somerset won by 3 wickets
Headingley, Leeds
Umpires: Chris Balderstone & Allan Jones
Player of the match: Andy Hayhurst (Yorkshire)

- Match was scheduled for one day but extended to two.

=== Quarter-finals ===
26 July 1994
(scorecard)

Derbyshire; 128 all out (43.5 overs)	v	Kent; 129/5 (47.3 overs)
Dominic Cork 62; Mark Ealham 4/10 (8.5 overs)		Graham Cowdrey 32*; Dominic Cork 2/24 (12 overs)

Kent won by 5 wickets
County Ground, Derby
Umpires: John Holder & Kevin Lyons
Player of the match: Mark Ealham (Kent)

26, 27 July 1994
(scorecard)

Glamorgan; 161 all out (55.4 overs)	v	Surrey; 165/5 (48.4 overs)
Tony Cottey 36; Tony Murphy 6/26 (12 overs)		Graham Thorpe 56; Robert Croft 2/24 (8.4 overs)

Surrey won by 5 wickets
St. Helen's, Swansea
Umpires: Ken Palmer & George Sharp
Player of the match: Tony Murphy (Surrey)

- Match was scheduled for one day but extended to two.

26 July 1994
(scorecard)

Somerset; 124 all out (50.2 overs)	v	Warwickshire; 125/2 (24.1 overs)
Andy Hayhurst 29*; Neil Smith 4/26 (8.2 overs)		Dominic Ostler 47; Harvey Trump 1/41 (6.1 overs)

Warwickshire won by 8 wickets
County Ground, Taunton
Umpires: Vanburn Holder & Barrie Leadbeater
Player of the match: Neil Smith (Somerset)

26 July 1994
(scorecard)

Northamptonshire; 128 all out (46.1 overs)	v	Worcestershire; 129/8 (45.1 overs)
Mal Loye 34; Phil Newport 4/30 (7.1 overs)		Tom Moody 40; Curtly Ambrose 3/16 (12 overs)

Worcestershire won by 2 wickets
New Road, Worcester
Umpires: John Harris & Peter Wight
Player of the match: Steve Rhodes (Worcestershire)

=== Semi-finals ===
9 August 1994
(scorecard)

Worcestershire; 357/2 (60 overs)	v	Surrey; 350 all out (59.5 overs)
Tom Moody 180*; Tony Pigott 1/61 (12 overs)		Darren Bicknell 89; Graeme Hick 4/54 (11 overs)

Worcestershire won by 7 runs
The Oval, London
Umpires: Roy Palmer & Alan Whitehead
Player of the match: Tom Moody (Worcestershire)

9 August 1994
(scorecard)

Warwickshire; 265/8 (60 overs)	v	Kent; 257 all out (59.2 overs)
Andy Moles 105*; Matthew Fleming 3/28 (6 overs)		Neil Taylor 64; Dermot Reeve 3/44 (11 overs)

Warwickshire won by 8 runs
Edgbaston, Birmingham
Umpires: John Hampshire & Barrie Meyer
Player of the match: Andy Moles (Warwickshire)

=== Final ===
3, 4 September 1994
(scorecard)

Warwickshire; 223/9 (60 overs)	v	Worcestershire; 227/2 (49.1 overs)
Brian Lara 81; Phil Newport 4/38 (12 overs)		Graeme Hick 93*; Tim Munton 1/23 (12 overs)

Worcestershire won by 8 wickets
Lord's, London
Umpires: Nigel Plews & David Shepherd
Player of the match: Tom Moody (Worcestershire)

- Match was scheduled for one day but extended to two.
