= Paul Roshier =

Australian-born English cricketer (born 1963)

Personal information
- Full name: Paul Gregory Roshier
- Born: 8 October 1963 (age 63); Mount Beauty, Victoria, Australia
- Batting: Right-handed
- Bowling: Right-arm medium-fast

Domestic team information
- Years: Team
- 1995: Surrey
- 1991–1993: Buckinghamshire

Career statistics
Competition	List A
Matches	4
Runs scored	35
Batting average	11.66
100s/50s	–/–
Top score	32
Balls bowled	264
Wickets	3
Bowling average	75.33
5 wickets in innings	–
10 wickets in match	–
Best bowling	1/40
Catches/stumpings	1/–
- Source: Cricinfo, 3 May 2011

Paul Gregory Roshier (born 8 October 1963) is an Australian born former English cricketer. Roshier was a right-handed batsman who bowled right-arm medium-fast. He was born in Mount Beauty, Victoria.

Roshier made his debut for Buckinghamshire in the 1991 MCCA Knockout Trophy against Bedfordshire. Roshier played Minor counties cricket for Buckinghamshire from 1991 to 1993, which included 12 Minor Counties Championship matches and 5 MCCA Knockout Trophy matches. He made his List A debut for Buckinghamshire against Somerset in the 1991 NatWest Trophy. He made two further List A appearances for the county, against Sussex in 1992 and Leicestershire in 1993.

In 1995, he appeared in a single List A match for Surrey against Young Australia. In total, Roshier played four List A matches, scoring 35 runs and taking 3 wickets.
