= Adam Cole (cricketer) =

English cricketer (born 1974)

Personal information
- Full name: Adam Peter Cole
- Born: 4 May 1974 (age 52); Norwich, Norfolk, England
- Batting: Right-handed
- Bowling: Right-arm fast-medium

Domestic team information
- Years: Team
- 1998–2000: Buckinghamshire
- 1993–1994: Norfolk

Career statistics
Competition	List A
Matches	3
Runs scored	12
Batting average	6.00
100s/50s	–/–
Top score	8*
Balls bowled	192
Wickets	5
Bowling average	36.60
5 wickets in innings	–
10 wickets in match	–
Best bowling	2/55
Catches/stumpings	–/–
- Source: Cricinfo, 11 May 2011

Adam Peter Cole (born 4 May 1974) is an English former cricketer. He was a right-handed batsman who bowled right-arm fast-medium. He was born in Norwich, Norfolk.

Cole made his debut for Norfolk in the 1993 MCCA Knockout Trophy against Bedfordshire, his only appearance for the county in that competition. He played Minor Counties cricket for Norfolk from 1993 to 1994, which included six Minor Counties Championship matches. It was for Norfolk that he made his debut in List A cricket against Warwickshire in the 1993 NatWest Trophy, playing a further match in that format for the county in the 1994 NatWest Trophy against Worcestershire.

He later joined Buckinghamshire, making his debut for the county in the 1998 MCCA Knockout Trophy against Berkshire. He played Minor Counties cricket for the county from 1998 to 2000, which included 14 Minor Counties Championship matches and eight MCCA Knockout Trophy matches. He also played a single List A match for Buckinghamshire against Surrey in the 1998 NatWest Trophy.

Cole also played Second XI cricket for the Essex Second XI, Sussex Second XI, Hampshire Second XI and Worcestershire Second XI.
