= Jonathan Gray (cricketer) =

English cricketer

Personal information
- Full name: Jonathan David Gray
- Born: 15 July 1960 (age 66); Congleton, Cheshire, England
- Batting: Right-handed

Domestic team information
- Years: Team
- 1989–1998: Cheshire
- 1999: Staffordshire

Career statistics
Competition	List A
Matches	4
Runs scored	81
Batting average	27.00
100s/50s	0/1
Top score	51*
Catches/stumpings	4/–
- Source: Cricinfo, 13 April 2011

Jonathan David Gray (born 15 July 1960) is an English cricketer.

Gray made his debut for Cheshire in the 1989 Minor Counties Championship against Shropshire. Gray played Minor counties cricket for Cheshire from 1989 to 1998, including 54 Minor Counties Championship matches and 9 MCCA Knockout Trophy matches. In 1993, he made his List A debut against Nottinghamshire in the NatWest Trophy. He played two further List A matches for Cheshire, against Durham in 1994 and Essex in the 1995 NatWest Trophy.

In 1999, Gray joined Staffordshire, where he represented the team in one MCCA Knockout Trophy match against Oxfordshire. He also played a single List A match for Staffordshire in the 1999 NatWest Trophy against the Durham Cricket Board. In total, Brock played four List A matches, scoring 81 runs at a batting average of 27.00, with a high score of 51*. His highest score came playing for Cheshire against Durham, in which he scored a sedate half century from 126 balls before being dismissed by Simon Brown.
