= Anthony Murphy =

Anthony Murphy may refer to:

- Anthony Murphy (artist) (born 1956), English painter and child-actor
- Anthony Joseph Murphy (1913–1996), Newfoundland politician
- Tony Murphy (cricketer) (born 1962), English cricketer

== See also ==
- Tony Murphy (disambiguation)
