= Ligertwood =

Ligertwood is a surname. Notable people with the surname include:

- Alex Ligertwood (1946–2026), Scottish singer, guitarist, and drummer
- David Ligertwood (born 1969), English cricketer
- G. C. Ligertwood (1888–1967), Australian judge
- Scott Ligertwood (born 1983), Australian songwriter and guitarist for Hillsong United

== See also ==
- John Ligertwood Paterson (1820–1882), Scottish physician
