= Barry Metcalf =

Barry Metcalf may refer to:

- Barry Metcalf (cricketer), Welsh cricketer
- Barry Metcalf (politician), member of the Kentucky Senate

== See also ==
- Barry Metcalfe, Australian rules footballer
