= Steven Willis =

English cricketer

Stephen Willis
Personal information
- Full name: Stephen Martin Willis
- Born: 19 September 1969 (age 57); Dawlish, Devon, England
- Batting: Right-handed

Domestic team information
- Years: Team
- 1991–1994: Devon

Career statistics
Competition	List A
Matches	3
Runs scored	102
Batting average	34.00
100s/50s	0/0
Top score	42
Catches/stumpings	1/–
- Source: Cricinfo, 6 February 2011

Stephen Martin Willis (born 19 September 1969) is a former English cricketer. Willis was a right-handed batsman. He was born in Dawlish, Devon.

Willis made his debut for Devon in the 1991 Minor Counties Championship against Berkshire. From 1991 to 1994, he represented the county in 32 Championship matches, the last of which came against Cambridgeshire. He made his MCCA Knockout Trophy debut for Devon in 1991 against Staffordshire. From 1991 to 1994, he represented the county in 6 Trophy matches, the last of which came against Lincolnshire. Willis played List A cricket for Devon at a time when they were permitted to take part in the domestic one-day competition, making his debut in that format in the 1993 NatWest Trophy against Kent. He played 2 further List A matches in the 1994 NatWest Trophy against Derbyshire and Yorkshire in the 1993 NatWest Trophy. In his 3 List A matches, he scored 102 runs at a batting average of 34.00, with a high score of 42.
