= Prigent =

Prigent is a surname. Notable people with the surname include:

- Bastien and Henry Prigent, French/Breton sculptors
- Denez Prigent, (born 1966), French/Breton folk singer-songwriter
- Jean-Yves Prigent, French slalom canoeist
- Neil Prigent, (born 1964), English cricketer
- Robert Prigent (1910–1995), French politician

== See also ==
- Marie-Françoise Grange-Prigent, French slalom canoeist
- Loïk Le Floch-Prigent, (born 1943), French engineer and businessman
- François Tanguy-Prigent, (1909–1970), French politician and resistance fighter
