= Michael Davidson =

Michael or Mike Davidson may refer to:

- Michael Davidson (poet) (born 1944), American poet
- Michael Davidson (singer) (born 1963), singer and songwriter
- Michael Davidson (journalist) (1897–1976), English journalist, memoirist and pederast
- Michael Davidson (cricketer, born 1970), former English cricketer
- Michael Davidson (cricketer, born 1981), New Zealand cricketer
- Michael Davidson (cricketer, born 1992), New Zealand cricketer
- Michael W. Davidson (1950–2015), American microscopist
- Mike Davidson (swimmer) (born 1963), former freestyle swimmer from New Zealand
- Mike Davidson (politician) (born 1976), member of parliament in New Zealand
- Michael C. Davidson (died 2015), captain of the SS El Faro

== See also ==
- Michael Davison (disambiguation)
