= Memorial Ground, Finchampstead =

Cricket ground in Berkshire, England

Memorial Ground
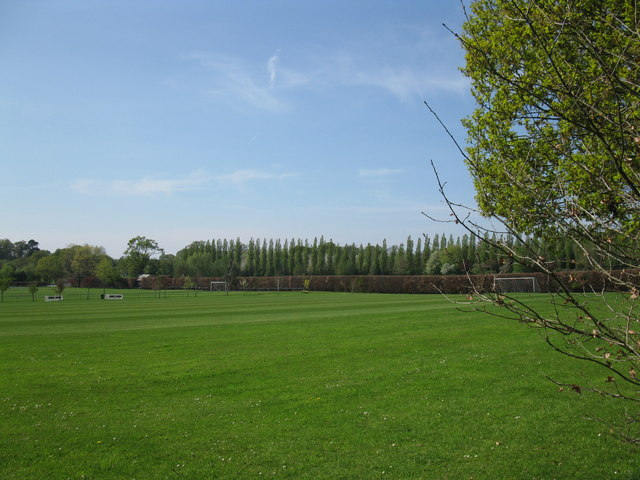
- Interactive map of Memorial Ground

Ground information
- Location: Finchampstead, Berkshire
- Country: England
- Coordinates: 51.3629°N 0.8624°W
- Establishment: c. 1930

International information
- Only women's ODI: 25 July 1993: England v India

Team information
| Berkshire | (1982–present) |
- As of 6 September 2020; Source: Ground profile

The Memorial Ground (also known as Finchampstead Park) is a cricket ground in Finchampstead, Berkshire, England. The ground is located at the northern end of the village and is part of a wider sporting complex.

== History ==
Appearing on maps as early as 1930, Berkshire first played there against Buckinghamshire in the 1982 Minor Counties Championship. List A cricket was first played at the ground in the 1988 NatWest Trophy when Berkshire played Yorkshire, with their first-class opponents winning by 10 wickets. The ground was a venue for the 1993 Women's World Cup, hosting a single match between England Women and India Women, which England won by 3 runs. A second List A match was played there the following year in the 1994 NatWest Trophy with Kent as the visitors. With the exception of 1985, one Minor Counties Championship match was played there annually from Berkshire's first match there, with the ground also hosting its first MCCA Knockout Trophy match in 1997 when Berkshire played Shropshire. Two further List A matches were later played there, with Berkshire losing to Durham in the 2000 NatWest Trophy and defeating Ireland by 4 wickets. Six further MCCA Knockout Trophy matches have been played there, the last of which came in 2006 between Berkshire and Devon, while the arrangement of hosting one Minor Counties Championship match annually continues.

Finchampstead Cricket Club use the ground as their home venue. It also has football and hockey playing facilities, with Hellenic League members Finchampstead F.C. playing there.

== Records ==
=== List A ===
- Highest team total: 384/6 (60 overs) by Kent v Berkshire, 1994
- Lowest team total: 97 all out (28.5 overs) by Berkshire v Durham, 2000
- Highest individual innings: 136* by Carl Hooper for Kent v Berkshire, 1994
- Best bowling in an innings: 5/87 by Philip Oxley for Berkshire v Kent, 1994

== See also ==
- List of cricket grounds in England and Wales
