= Tony Murphy =

Tony Murphy may refer to:

- Tony Murphy (auditor) (born 1962), Irish auditor
- Tony Murphy (Australian footballer) (born 1940), former Australian rules footballer
- Tony Murphy (baseball) (1859–1915), American Association catcher
- Tony Murphy (basketball) (born 1957), retired American basketball player
- Tony Murphy (badminton) (born 1990), Northern Irish badminton player
- Tony Murphy (cricketer) (born 1962), former English cricketer
- Tony Murphy (Gaelic footballer) (1950–2004), Irish Gaelic football player

== See also ==
- Anthony Murphy (disambiguation)
