= Timothy Ward =

English cricketer

Personal information
- Full name: Timothy William Ward
- Born: 28 June 1968 (age 58); Paignton, Devon, England
- Batting: Right-handed
- Bowling: Right-arm medium

Domestic team information
- Years: Team
- 1987–1997: Devon

Career statistics
Competition	List A
Matches	4
Runs scored	37
Batting average	9.25
100s/50s	–/–
Top score	17
Balls bowled	262
Wickets	5
Bowling average	49.80
5 wickets in innings	–
10 wickets in match	–
Best bowling	3/60
Catches/stumpings	4/–
- Source: Cricinfo, 10 February 2011

Timothy William Ward (born 28 October 1968) is a former English cricketer. Ward was a right-handed batsman who bowled right-arm medium pace. He was born in Paignton, Devon.

Ward made his debut for Devon in the 1987 Minor Counties Championship against Dorset. From 1987 to 1997, he represented the county in 37 Championship matches, the last of which came against Herefordshire. He made his MCCA Knockout Trophy debut for the county in 1987 against Dorset. From 1987 to 1995, he represented the county in 13 Trophy matches, the last of which came against Cornwall. Ward also played List A cricket for Devon at a time when they were permitted to take part in the domestic one-day competition, making his debut in that format in the 1987 NatWest Trophy against Worcestershire. He played 3 further List A matches between 1987 and 1993, the last of which came against Derbyshire in the 1993 NatWest Trophy. In his 4 List A matches, he scored 37 runs at a batting average of 9.25, with a high score of 17. With the ball he took 5 wickets at a bowling average of 49.80, with best figures of 3/60.

In 1989, he represented the Gloucestershire Second XI.
