= Michael Davison =

Michael Davison may refer to:

- Michael S. Davison (1917–2006), American general
- Michael S. Davison Jr. (born 1941), American lieutenant general
- Mike Davison (politician) (born 1950), Canadian politician
- Mike Davison (baseball) (1945–2013), American baseball player

== See also ==
- Michael Davidson (disambiguation)
