= David Ratcliffe (cricketer) =

English cricketer (1939–2021)

David Philip Ratcliffe (11 May 1939 – 30 April 2021) was an English cricketer who played in 20 first-class cricket matches for Warwickshire between 1957 and 1968. He was born in Hall Green, Birmingham.

Ratcliffe was a right-handed opening batsman. He appeared in occasional first-team matches from 1957 to 1962, but only in 1961 did he have any success, scoring 378 runs in 10 games with an average of 22.23. This season also included his highest score, an innings of 79 in the match against Scotland when Warwickshire played a largely experimental side. In the next Warwickshire match, he made 62 against Somerset and this was his only score of more than 50 in a County Championship game. After 1962, he continued to play for Warwickshire's second eleven across the 1960s, and made a single final appearance in the first team for the match against Scotland in 1968.

His son, Jason Ratcliffe, also played first-class cricket for Warwickshire before moving to play for Surrey.
