= Liam Watkinson =

English cricketer (born 1991)

Personal information
- Full name: Liam Watkinson
- Born: 27 July 1991 (age 35); Bolton, Lancashire
- Batting: Right-handed
- Bowling: Right-arm medium

Domestic team information
- Years: Team
- 2015–2016: Leeds/Bradford MCCU
- FC debut: 2 April 2015 Leeds/Bradford MCCU v Sussex

Career statistics
Competition	FC
Matches	4
Runs scored	71
Batting average	23.66
100s/50s	0/0
Top score	35
Balls bowled	540
Wickets	5
Bowling average	69.40
5 wickets in innings	0
10 wickets in match	0
Best bowling	3/132
Catches/stumpings	1/–
- Source: Cricinfo, 7 April 2016

Liam Watkinson (born 27 July 1991) is an English cricketer. He is a right-handed batsman and was a right-arm medium-pace bowler.

He made his first-class debut for Leeds/Bradford MCCU against Sussex on 2 April 2015. His father is former international cricketer Mike Watkinson, who played four Tests and a single One Day International for England between 1995 and 1996, and also played for Lancashire between 1982 and 2000.
