= Graeme Morris (cricketer) =

English cricketer (born 1963)

Personal information
- Full name: Graeme Reginald Morris
- Born: 5 February 1963 (age 63); Newcastle upon Tyne, Northumberland, England
- Batting: Left-handed
- Bowling: Right-arm medium

Domestic team information
- Years: Team
- 1982–1997: Northumberland

Career statistics
Competition	List A
Matches	3
Runs scored	76
Batting average	38.00
100s/50s	0/0
Top score	47
Catches/stumpings	1/–
- Source: Cricinfo, 1 July 2011

Graeme Reginald Morris (born 5 February 1963) is a former English cricketer. Morris was a left-handed batsman who bowled right-arm medium pace. He was born in Newcastle upon Tyne, Northumberland.

Morris made his debut for Northumberland in the 1982 Minor Counties Championship against Staffordshire. Morris played Minor counties cricket for Northumberland from 1982 to 1997, which included 99 Minor Counties Championship appearances and 16 MCCA Knockout Trophy matches. He made his List A debut against Essex in the 1986 NatWest Trophy. He made 2 further List A appearances, against Yorkshire in the 1992 NatWest Trophy and Nottinghamshire in the 1994 NatWest Trophy. In his 3 List A matches, he scored 76 runs at an average of 38.00, with a high score of 47 for which he won MOTM vs Yorkshire CCC.
