= David Griffiths (cricketer) =

English cricketer (born 1985)

Personal information
- Full name: David Andrew Griffiths
- Born: 10 September 1985 (age 41); Newport, Isle of Wight, England
- Nickname: Griff
- Height: 6 ft 1 in (1.85 m)
- Batting: Left-handed
- Bowling: Right-arm fast
- Role: Bowler
- Relatives: Adrian Griffiths (father)

Domestic team information
- Years: Team
- 2006–2013: Hampshire (squad no. 18)
- 2014–2016: Kent (squad no. 18)

Career statistics
Competition	FC	LA	T20
Matches	38	31	31
Runs scored	220	30	38
Batting average	6.66	15.00	12.66
100s/50s	0/0	0/0	0/0
Top score	31*	12*	18*
Balls bowled	6,007	1,185	622
Wickets	113	37	32
Bowling average	33.87	32.18	28.78
5 wickets in innings	4	0	0
10 wickets in match	0	0	0
Best bowling	7/102	4/29	4/22
Catches/stumpings	4/–	5/–	6/–
- Source: Cricinfo, 26 September 2016

David Andrew Griffiths (born 10 September 1985) is an English former cricketer who played at first-class level for Hampshire and Kent County Cricket Clubs in a professional playing career which spanned from 2006 to 2016. Playing as a right-arm fast bowler, he took over 100 wickets in first-class cricket.

== Early life and career with Hampshire ==
Griffiths was born at Newport on the Isle of Wight in September 1985. He was born into a sporting family, with his Welsh father, Adrian, playing cricket for Wales Minor Counties. He was educated on the Isle of Wight at Sandown High School. In his youth, he was a member of the Hampshire Academy, and played for the England under-19 cricket team against Bangladesh Under-19s in 2004, as well as touring India and Malaysia with the team in 2005, playing a total of three Under-19 Test matches and four Under-19 One Day Internationals. Griffiths signed his first professional contract with Hampshire in 2004, alongside Jono McLean.

He spent much of the 2005 season injured, before making his debut for Hampshire in a first-class match against Loughborough UCCE. In doing so, he became the first cricketer from the Isle of Wight to represent Hampshire since William Scott, some 78-years previously. The following season, he made five appearances in the 2007 County Championship, in addition to playing in three Twenty20 matches in the Twenty20 Cup. It was not until the 2008 season that he made his debut in List A one-day cricket, against Gloucestershire in Friends Provident Trophy. During much of Griffiths' time with Hampshire, he was beset with a number of injuries. These led to Hampshire releasing him at the end of the 2013 season. In total, he played 36 first-class, 22 one-day, and nine Twenty20 matches for Hampshire as a fast bowler. In first-class cricket, he took 105 wickets at an average of 34.80; he took three five wicket hauls, with best figures of 6 for 85 against Nottinghamshire in 2011. In one-day and Twenty20 cricket, he took 27 and 9 wickets respectively, with a one-day bowling performance of note coming in the final of the 2012 Clydesdale Bank 40, when his dismissal of Ian Bell on 81 turned the match in Hampshire's favour.

== Move to Kent and post-retirement ==
In September 2013, he signed for Kent, making his debut for the county in a first-class match against Loughborough MCCU (formerly UCCE) at Canterbury in 2014. Injuries restricted him to bowling only 63 overs during the 2014 season and limited him to only two Twenty20 appearances in 2015, before his season was cut short by triceps and back injuries which required surgery. He returned to playing in 2016 following successful surgery on his back, and was mostly utilised by Kent as a "death bowler" in Twenty20 matches. He played two first-class and nine one-day matches for Kent, but played the majority (22) of his matches in Twenty20 cricket, taking 23 wickets at an average of 29.73, with best figures of 4 for 22; he was Kent's leading wicket-taker in the 2016 T20 Blast.

Griffiths left Kent at the end of the 2016 season, following the expiration of his contract. In addition to a first-class career, Griffiths had formerly played minor counties cricket for Berkshire, making an appearance each in the 2008 and 2011 Minor Counties Championship. Following his retirement, he played club cricket and coached for Basingstoke & North Hants Cricket Club in the Southern Premier League, taking 86 wickets for them. He then emigrated to South Africa, where he took up a coaching role at Hilton College. In 2019, he donated a kidney to his sister, who lived in Australia.
