= Michael Davidson (cricketer, born 1970) =

English cricketer (born 1970)

Personal information
- Full name: Michael Joseph Davidson
- Born: 18 October 1970 (age 56); Penrith, Cumberland, England
- Batting: Right-handed
- Role: Wicket-keeper

Domestic team information
- Years: Team
- 1989–1995: Shropshire

Career statistics
Competition	List A
Matches	2
Runs scored	41
Batting average	21.00
100s/50s	–/–
Top score	41
Balls bowled	–
Wickets	–
Bowling average	–
5 wickets in innings	–
10 wickets in match	–
Best bowling	–
Catches/stumpings	–/–
- Source: Cricinfo, 3 July 2011

Michael Joseph Davidson (born 18 October 1970) is a former English cricketer. Davidson was a right-handed batsman who fielded as a wicket-keeper. He was born in Penrith, Cumberland.

Davidson made his debut for Shropshire in the 1989 Minor Counties Championship against Wales Minor Counties. Davidson played Minor counties cricket for Shropshire from 1989 to 1995, which included 28 Minor Counties Championship appearances and 3 MCCA Knockout Trophy matches. He made his List A debut against Middlesex in the 1992 NatWest Trophy. In this match, he scored 42 runs before being dismissed by John Emburey. He made a further List A appearance against Somerset in the 1993 NatWest Trophy. He was dismissed for a duck by Keith Parsons in this match. During the same period he played club cricket for Newport in that county.

Davidson was also a professional footballer who has played for Hereford United and Telford United.
