= Bill Smith (cricketer) =

English cricketer (1937–2018)

Personal information
- Full name: William Albert Smith
- Born: 15 September 1937; Salisbury, England
- Died: 9 September 2018 (aged 80)
- Batting: Left-handed
- Bowling: Right-arm medium
- Relatives: Andy Smith (son)

Domestic team information
- Years: Team
- 1972: Minor Counties South
- 1971-1976: Wiltshire
- 1961-1970: Surrey

Career statistics
| Competition | FC | LA |
|---|---|---|
| Matches | 144 | 28 |
| Runs scored | 5,024 | 453 |
| Batting average | 22.42 | 19.69 |
| 100s/50s | 2/23 | –/2 |
| Top score | 103 | 64 |
| Balls bowled | 6 | – |
| Wickets | – | – |
| Bowling average | – | – |
| 5 wickets in innings | – | – |
| 10 wickets in match | – | – |
| Best bowling | – | – |
| Catches/stumpings | 51/– | 9/– |
- Source: Cricinfo, 13 October 2010

William 'Bill' Albert Smith (15 September 1937 – 9 September 2018) was an English cricketer who played for Surrey.

Smith was born at Salisbury, Wiltshire. A left-handed batsman, he made his first-class debut for Surrey against Oxford University in 1961. His second first-class appearance against Somerset in 1962 was his debut in the County Championship. From 1961 to 1970, he represented Surrey in 144 first-class matches, the last of which came against Leicestershire in 1970.

In his first-class career he scored 5,042 runs at a batting average of 22.42, with 23 half centuries and two centuries. His highest score was 103. In the field he took 51 catches. He also played List A cricket for Surrey. His debut List A match came against Gloucestershire in the 1964 Gillette Cup. From 1964 to 1970, he represented the county in 22 List A matches, the last of which came against Glamorgan in the 1970 John Player League.

Smith joined Wiltshire in 1971, making his Minor Counties Championship debut against Dorset. From 1971 to 1976, he represented the county in 26 Minor Counties Championship matches, the last of which came against the Somerset Second XI. He represented Wiltshire in two List A matches against Hampshire in the 1972 and 1973 Gillette Cups. He also represented Minor Counties South in four List A matches in the 1972 Benson and Hedges Cup. In his 28 career List A matches, he scored 453 runs at an average of 19.69, with 2 half centuries and a high score of 64, while in the field he took 9 catches.

According to Roger Harman, he was such a fine fielder, especially at cover point, that his team-mates called him "elastic hands".

Outside the cricket season, he worked as a carpenter-joiner, as well as coaching at Dulwich College.

== Family ==
His son Andy also played first-class and List A cricket for Surrey. He and his wife, Gwen, also had a daughter.
