= Patrick Jobson =

English cricketer

Personal information
- Full name: Patrick Michael Jobson
- Born: 4 April 1967 (age 59); Oxford, Oxfordshire, England
- Batting: Right-handed
- Bowling: Right-arm medium

Domestic team information
- Years: Team
- 1986–2001: Oxfordshire

Career statistics
Competition	List A
Matches	6
Runs scored	50
Batting average	10.00
100s/50s	–/–
Top score	30
Balls bowled	–
Wickets	–
Bowling average	–
5 wickets in innings	–
10 wickets in match	–
Best bowling	–
Catches/stumpings	2/–
- Source: Cricinfo, 20 May 2011

Patrick Michael Jobson (born 4 April 1967) is a former English cricketer. Jobson was a right-handed batsman who bowled right-arm medium pace. He was born in Oxford, Oxfordshire.

Jobson made his debut for Oxfordshire in the 1986 Minor Counties Championship against Shropshire. Jobson played Minor counties cricket for Oxfordshire from 1986 to 2001, which included 45 Minor Counties Championship matches and 13 MCCA Knockout Trophy matches. He made his List A debut against Gloucestershire in the 1989 NatWest Trophy. He played 5 further List A matches, the last coming against Somerset in the 1994 NatWest Trophy. In his 6 List A matches, he scored 50 runs at a batting average of 10.00, with a high score of 30.

He had previously played Second XI cricket for the Essex Second XI.
