= Adrian Griffiths (Welsh cricketer) =

Welsh cricketer (born 1959)

Personal information
- Full name: Adrian David Griffiths
- Born: 27 November 1959 (age 66); Carmarthen, Carmarthenshire, Wales
- Batting: Right-handed
- Bowling: Right-arm fast-medium
- Relatives: David Griffiths (son)

Domestic team information
- Years: Team
- 1991–1996: Wales Minor Counties

Career statistics
Competition	List A
Matches	2
Runs scored	6
Batting average	6.00
100s/50s	–/–
Top score	6
Balls bowled	102
Wickets	4
Bowling average	21.75
5 wickets in innings	–
10 wickets in match	–
Best bowling	3/57
Catches/stumpings	1/–
- Source: Cricinfo, 23 January 2024

Adrian David Griffiths (born 27 November 1959) is a former Welsh cricketer. Griffiths was a right-handed batsman who bowled right-arm fast-medium. He was born in Carmarthen, Carmarthenshire.

Griffiths made his debut for Wales Minor Counties in the 1990 MCCA Knockout Trophy against Shropshire. He played Minor counties cricket for Wales Minor Counties from 1990 to 1996, which included 39 Minor Counties Championship matches and eight MCCA Knockout Trophy matches. In 1993, he made his List A debut against Sussex, in the NatWest Trophy. He played a further List A match for the team, against Middlesex in the 1994 NatWest Trophy. In his two List A matches, he scored six runs, while with the ball he took four wickets at a bowling average of 21.75, with best figures of 3/57. His son is the former cricketer David Griffiths.
