= Mark Ellis (cricketer) =

English cricketer (born 1962)

Personal information
- Full name: Mark Thomas Ellis
- Born: 16 May 1962 (age 64); Castle Acre, Norfolk, England
- Batting: Right-handed
- Bowling: Right-arm fast-medium

Domestic team information
- Years: Team
- 1987–1991: Norfolk

Career statistics
| Competition | List A |
|---|---|
| Matches | 2 |
| Runs scored | 0 |
| Batting average | 0.00 |
| 100s/50s | 0/0 |
| Top score | 0* |
| Balls bowled | 86 |
| Wickets | 2 |
| Bowling average | 22.50 |
| 5 wickets in innings | 0 |
| 10 wickets in match | 0 |
| Best bowling | 2/33 |
| Catches/stumpings | 1/– |
- Source: Cricinfo, 29 June 2011

Mark Thomas Ellis (born 19 May 1962) is a former English cricketer. Ellis was a right-handed batsman who bowled right-arm fast-medium. He was born in Castle Acre, Norfolk.

Ellis made his debut for Norfolk in the 1987 Minor Counties Championship against Cumberland. Ellis played Minor counties cricket for Norfolk from 1987 to 1991, which included 19 Minor Counties Championship matches and 7 MCCA Knockout Trophy matches. He made his List A debut against Yorkshire in the 1990 NatWest Trophy. In this match, he ended Norfolks' innings unbeaten on 0. With the ball, he bowled 2.2 wicket-less overs for the cost of 12 runs. He made a further List A appearance against Gloucestershire in the 1991 NatWest Trophy. In this match, he was dismissed for a duck by Richard Scott. He took the wickets of Jeremy Lloyds and Richard Scott.
