= Nigel Hackett =

English cricketer

Personal information
- Full name: Nigel Paul Hackett
- Born: 22 August 1962 (age 64); Stowbridge, Norfolk, England
- Batting: Right-handed
- Bowling: Left-arm medium-fast

Domestic team information
- Years: Team
- 1992: Minor Counties
- 1991–1994: Staffordshire

Career statistics
Competition	List A
Matches	6
Runs scored	5
Batting average	5.00
100s/50s	0/0
Top score	3*
Balls bowled	354
Wickets	8
Bowling average	31.37
5 wickets in innings	0
10 wickets in match	–
Best bowling	3/45
Catches/stumpings	4/–
- Source: Cricinfo, 15 June 2011

Nigel Paul Hackett (born 22 August 1962) is a former English cricketer. Hackett was a right-handed batsman who bowled left-arm medium-fast. He was born in Stowbridge, Norfolk.

Hackett made his debut for Staffordshire in the 1991 MCCA Knockout Trophy against Oxfordshire. Hackett played Minor counties cricket for Staffordshire from 1991 to 1993, which included 25 Minor Counties Championship matches and 12 MCCA Knockout Trophy matches. In 1991, he made his List A debut for Staffordshire against Northamptonshire in the NatWest Trophy. He made 3 further appearances in List A cricket for the county, the last coming against Surrey in the 1994 NatWest Trophy. In his 4 List A matches for the county, he took 4 wickets at an average of 39.00, with best figures of 3/45. He made 2 List A appearances for the Minor Counties cricket team in the 1992 Benson & Hedges Cup against Sussex and Leicestershire. In these matches, he took 4 wickets for the team at an average of 23.75, with best figures of 3/55.
