= Peter Robinson (cricketer, born 1929) =

Trinidadian-born English cricketer

Personal information
- Full name: Peter Michael Heasty Robinson
- Born: 14 October 1929; Port of Spain, Trinidad and Tobago
- Died: 23 March 2023 (aged 93)
- Batting: Right-handed
- Bowling: Right-arm off break Right-arm medium
- Relatives: Jonathan Robinson (son)

Career statistics
Competition	First-class
Matches	1
Runs scored	19
Batting average	9.50
100s/50s	0/0
Top score	12
Balls bowled	72
Wickets	0
Bowling average	–
5 wickets in innings	–
10 wickets in match	–
Best bowling	–
Catches/stumpings	0/–
- Source: Cricinfo, 24 June 2019

Peter Michael Heasty Robinson (14 October 1929 – 23 March 2023) was a Trinidadian-born English first-class cricketer.

Robinson was born at Port of Spain and educated in England at Lancing College and at Magdalene College, Cambridge. An all-rounder, he played a single first-class cricket match for L. C. Stevens' XI against Cambridge University at Eastbourne in 1961. His son, Jonathan, played first-class cricket for Surrey from 1988 to 1992.
