= Jefferson Jones (cricketer) =

Barbadian born former English cricketer (born 1954)

Personal information
- Full name: Jefferson Harcourt Jones
- Born: 6 January 1954 (age 72); Christ Church, Barbados
- Batting: Right-handed
- Bowling: Right-arm fast-medium

Domestic team information
- Years: Team
- 1972–1994: Berkshire

Career statistics
Competition	List A
Matches	11
Runs scored	20
Batting average	6.66
100s/50s	0/0
Top score	12*
Balls bowled	678
Wickets	15
Bowling average	35.60
5 wickets in innings	0
10 wickets in match	0
Best bowling	4/35
Catches/stumpings	1/–
- Source: Cricinfo, 20 September 2010

Jefferson Harcourt Jones (born 6 January 1954) is a Barbadian born former English cricketer. Jones was a right-handed batsman who bowled right-arm fast-medium. He was born at Christ Church, Barbados.

Jones made his Minor Counties Championship debut for Berkshire in 1972 against Oxfordshire. From 1972 to 1994, he represented the county in 161 Minor Counties Championship matches, the last of which came in the 1994 Championship when Berkshire played Wiltshire. Jones also played in the MCCA Knockout Trophy for Berkshire. His debut in that competition came in 1983 when Berkshire played Norfolk. From 1983 to 1992, he represented the county in 13 Trophy matches, the last of which came when Berkshire played Buckinghamshire in the 1992 MCCA Knockout Trophy.

Additionally, he also played List-A matches for Berkshire. His List-A debut for the county came against Hertfordshire in the 1976 Gillette Cup. From 1976 to 1992, he represented the county in 11 List-A matches, with his final List-A match coming in the 1992 NatWest Trophy when Berkshire played Derbyshire at the County Ground, Derby. In his 11 matches, he took 15 wickets at a bowling average of 35.60, with best figures of 4/35.
