= Kevin Sample =

English cricketer

Personal information
- Full name: Edward Kevin Sample
- Born: 19 February 1961 (age 65); Barrow-in-Furness, Lancashire, England
- Batting: Right-handed
- Bowling: Right-arm fast-medium

Domestic team information
- Years: Team
- 1980–1992: Cumberland

Career statistics
Competition	List A
Matches	3
Runs scored	5
Batting average	2.50
100s/50s	0/0
Top score	4
Balls bowled	200
Wickets	7
Bowling average	21.57
5 wickets in innings	0
10 wickets in match	–
Best bowling	4/58
Catches/stumpings	0/–
- Source: Cricinfo, 31 March 2011

Edward Kevin Sample (born 19 February 1961) is an English former cricketer. Sample was a right-handed batsman who bowled right-arm fast-medium. He was born in Barrow-in-Furness, Lancashire.

Sample made his debut for Cumberland in the 1980 Minor Counties Championship against Lincolnshire. Sample played Minor counties cricket for Cumberland from 1980 to 1992, including 31 Minor Counties Championship matches and 4 MCCA Knockout Trophy matches. In 1985, he made his List A debut against Middlesex in the NatWest Trophy. He played two further List A matches for Cumberland, against Lancashire in 1986 and Essex in 1992. In his three List A matches, he scored 5 runs at a batting average of 2.50, with a high score of 4. With the ball he took 7 wickets at a bowling average of 21.57. His best bowling figures of 4/58 came against Middlesex in 1985.

He also played for a number of first-class counties Second XI's. These included the Warwickshire Second XI, the Worcestershire Second XI, the Derbyshire Second XI and the Glamorgan Second XI.
