= Paul McKeown =

English cricketer (born 1962)

Personal information
- Full name: Paul Dominic McKeown
- Born: 3 May 1962 (age 64); Oldham, Lancashire, England
- Batting: Right-handed
- Bowling: Right-arm fast-medium

Domestic team information
- Years: Team
- 1989–1993: Lincolnshire

Career statistics
Competition	List A
Matches	2
Runs scored	4
Batting average	–
100s/50s	–/–
Top score	3*
Balls bowled	144
Wickets	3
Bowling average	45.33
5 wickets in innings	–
10 wickets in match	–
Best bowling	3/52
Catches/stumpings	1/–
- Source: Cricinfo, 25 June 2011

Paul Dominic McKeown (born 3 May 1962) is a former English cricketer. McKeown was a right-handed batsman who bowled right-arm fast-medium. He was born in Oldham, Lancashire.

McKeown made his debut for Lincolnshire in the 1987 Minor Counties Championship against Cambridgeshire. McKeown played Minor counties cricket for Lincolnshire from 1989 to 1993, which included 18 Minor Counties Championship matches and 2 MCCA Knockout Trophy matches. He made his List A debut against Gloucestershire in the 1990 NatWest Trophy. He bowled 12 wicket-less overs in the Gloucestershire innings, which cost 84 runs. With the bat, he scored 3 unbeaten runs. He played a further List A match for Lincolnshire against Nottinghamshire in the 1991 NatWest Trophy. In this match, he took 3 wickets for the cost of 52 runs from 12 overs, while with the bat he remained unbeaten on one at the end of the Lincolnshire innings.
