= Ajaz Akhtar =

British cricketer (born 1968)

Personal information
- Born: 1 September 1968 (age 58); Bahawalpur, Punjab, Pakistan
- Batting: Right-handed
- Bowling: Right-arm medium

Domestic team information
- Years: Team
- 1990–2011: Cambridgeshire

Career statistics
Competition	List A
Matches	16
Runs scored	278
Batting average	23.16
100s/50s	0/1
Top score	78
Balls bowled	874
Wickets	23
Bowling average	24.78
5 wickets in innings	0
10 wickets in match	0
Best bowling	4/28
Catches/stumpings	6/–
- Source: Cricinfo, 23 July 2010

Ajaz Akhtar (born 1 September 1968) is a former English first-class cricketer. Akhtar is a right-handed batsman who bowls right-arm medium pace. He was born in Bahawalpur, Pakistan. Upon coming to the United Kingdom in 1971, he was educated at Deacon's School, Teesside University, University of Hertfordshire and Durham University.

Akhtar made his debut for Cambridgeshire in the 1990 Minor Counties Championship against Staffordshire. From 1990 to 2011, he represented the county in 147 Minor Counties Championship matches. He also represented the county in 56 MCCA Knockout Trophy matches from 1991 to 2010.

Akhtar also represented Cambridgeshire in List A cricket, where he made his debut in that format of the game against Kent in the 1991 NatWest Trophy. From 1991 to 2004, he represented the county in sixteen List A matches, with his final List A appearance coming in the 2004 Cheltenham & Gloucester Trophy against Northamptonshire. In his sixteen List A matches, he scored 278 runs at a batting average of 23.16, with a single half century high score of 78. In the field he took 6 catches. With the ball, he took 23 wickets at a bowling average of 24.78, with best figures of 4/28.

He resigned as Cambridgeshire captain at the end of the 2010 season, before retiring midway through the 2011 season. He took over 500 wickets for Cambridgeshire.
