= Andrew Smith (cricketer, born 1969) =

English cricketer (born 1969)

Andrew (Andy) William Smith (born 30 May 1969 in Sutton, Surrey) is a former English cricketer who played first-class and List A cricket for Surrey from 1993 to 1996.

Playing against Oxford University in 1994 he scored 202 not out and 31 not out, and took three wickets. It was his only first-class century. In his next match a few days later he took his best figures, 5 for 103, against Somerset.

His father, Bill Smith, played first-class cricket for Surrey as a batsman from 1961 to 1970.
