= Michael Field-Buss =

Maltese-born English cricketer

Personal information
- Full name: Michael Gwyn Field-Buss
- Born: 23 September 1964 (age 62); Imtarfa, Malta
- Batting: Right-handed
- Bowling: Right-arm off break

Domestic team information
- Years: Team
- 1989–1995: Nottinghamshire
- 1987: Essex

Career statistics
| Competition | First-class | List A |
|---|---|---|
| Matches | 38 | 40 |
| Runs scored | 311 | 56 |
| Batting average | 10.72 | 5.09 |
| 100s/50s | –/– | –/– |
| Top score | 34* | 10* |
| Balls bowled | 5,571 | 1,806 |
| Wickets | 63 | 39 |
| Bowling average | 39.11 | 36.71 |
| 5 wickets in innings | 1 | – |
| 10 wickets in match | – | – |
| Best bowling | 6/42 | 4/62 |
| Catches/stumpings | 13/– | 7/– |
- Source: Cricinfo, 26 October 2011

Michael Gwyn Field-Buss (born 23 September 1964) is a Maltese born former English cricketer. Field-Buss was a right-handed batsman who bowled right-arm off break. He was born at Imtarfa, Malta.

Having played for the Essex Second XI since 1982, Field-Buss made his first-class debut for Essex against the touring Pakistanis. He played a second first-class match for Essex, this time in the 1987 County Championship against Middlesex at Lord's. He made no further appearances for the county and was released at the end of the 1988 season.

Joining Nottinghamshire in 1989, Field-Buss made his first-class debut for the county against Somerset. He made 35 further first-class appearances for the county, the last of which came against Worcestershire in the 1995 County Championship. A bowler, he took 63 wickets in his 36 first-class appearances for Nottinghamshire, which came at an average of 39.11, with best figures of 6/42. These figures, which was his only first-class five wicket haul, came against Kent in 1993. His List A debut for Nottinghamshire in the 1989 Refuge Assurance League against Lancashire. He made 39 further List A appearances for the county, the last of which came against Warwickshire in the 1994 AXA Equity & Law League. In his 40 List A matches for Nottinghamshire, he took 39 wickets at an average of 36.71, with best figures of 4/62.
