= Craig Wilkinson =

English cricketer

Personal information
- Full name: Craig William Wilkinson
- Born: 19 March 1963 (age 63); Wardle, Rochdale, Lancashire, England
- Batting: Right-handed
- Bowling: Right-arm medium

Domestic team information
- Years: Team
- 1995: Oxfordshire
- 1991: Leicestershire

Career statistics
Competition	First-class	List A
Matches	14	18
Runs scored	138	80
Batting average	12.54	80.00
100s/50s	–/–	–/–
Top score	41	35*
Balls bowled	1,890	818
Wickets	23	16
Bowling average	43.86	39.31
5 wickets in innings	–	–
10 wickets in match	–	–
Best bowling	4/59	3/16
Catches/stumpings	7/–	5/–
- Source: Cricinfo, 15 February 2013

Craig William Wilkinson (born 19 March 1963) is a former English cricketer. Wilkinson was a right-handed batsman who bowled right-arm medium pace. He was born at Wardle, Rochdale, Lancashire.

Wilkinson made his first-class debut for Leicestershire against Nottinghamshire in the 1991 County Championship at Trent Bridge. He made thirteen further first-class appearances for the county in that season, the last of which came against Kent. In his fourteen first-class matches, he took 23 wickets at an average of 43.86, with best figures of 4/59. With the bat he scored 138 runs at an average of 12.54, with a high score of 41. In that same season he made his List A debut against Derbyshire in the Refuge Assurance League at Grace Road. He made seventeen further List A appearances in that season, the last of which came against Gloucestershire in the same tournament. He took 16 wickets in his eighteen List A matches, at an average of 39.31 and with best figures of 3/16. He scored 80 runs with the bat, with a high score of 35 not out. This was the only season in which he played for Leicestershire, with Wilkinson later appearing in a single Minor Counties Championship match for Oxfordshire against Berkshire in 1995.
