= Steven McEwan =

English cricketer

Steven Michael McEwan (born 5 May 1962, in Worcester) is a former English first-class cricketer: a right-arm fast-medium bowler and lower-order right-handed batsman who played for Worcestershire and Durham.

== Career ==
McEwan was educated at Royal Grammar School Worcester, playing club cricket for Worcester City in the Birmingham and District Premier League he took 60 wickets and topped the league averages in 1984 which led Worcestershire sign him. McEwan made his first-class debut for Worcestershire against Oxford University in May 1985, though his influence on the match was minimal: nine wicketless overs and 13 runs with the bat. His maiden first-class wicket, that of Derbyshire captain Kim Barnett, came in his second game, two months later. In all he played ten times that season, finishing with 16 wickets at an average of 39.68.

Over the next three years, McEwan played a number of times for Worcestershire, but could never quite manage to hold down a regular first-team spot. This changed abruptly in 1989, when he took 52 wickets at 19.21, including three five-wicket hauls. With injuries restricting the appearances of Neal Radford and Phil Newport, McEwan's wickets contributed to the county winning the County Championship. For these feats he received his Worcestershire county cap. The 1990 season was much less friendly to bowlers, but nevertheless he claimed 38 scalps, and scored his only first-class fifty.

McEwan played no first-class cricket in 1991, languishing in the seconds throughout the year, but he then moved to Durham, newly possessed of first-class status, for what would prove to be his final season in the game. It proved to be something of an anticlimax, as he could manage only 17 wickets at an average of over 47. Despite enjoying a better time in the one-day game (21 wickets at 32), after a handful of second-team games at the start of 1993 McEwan called it a day.
