= John Glendenen =

English cricketer (born 1965)

John David Glendenen (born 20 June 1965) is a former English first-class cricketer. He was a right-handed batsman and right-arm medium-pace bowler who played for Durham. He was born in Middlesbrough.

He played for Durham during their first two years in the County Championship in 1992 and 1993. He scored 648 first-class runs, with a best of 117, and in 36 one day games, from 1989 to 2000 made 898 with a top score of 109.
