= Stephen Warman =

English cricketer (born 1967)

Personal information
- Full name: Stephen Nicholas Warman
- Born: 24 August 1967 (age 59); Lincoln, Lincolnshire, England
- Batting: Right-handed

Domestic team information
- Years: Team
- 1987–2001: Lincolnshire

Career statistics
Competition	List A
Matches	9
Runs scored	195
Batting average	24.37
100s/50s	–/–
Top score	39
Balls bowled	–
Wickets	–
Bowling average	–
5 wickets in innings	–
10 wickets in match	–
Best bowling	–
Catches/stumpings	3/–
- Source: Cricinfo, 25 June 2011

Stephen Nicholas Warman (born 24 August 1967) is a former English cricketer. Warman was a right-handed batsman. He was born in Lincoln, Lincolnshire.

Warman made his debut for Lincolnshire in the 1987 Minor Counties Championship against Staffordshire. Warman played Minor counties cricket for Lincolnshire from 1987 to 2001, which included 100 Minor Counties Championship matches and 24 MCCA Knockout Trophy matches. He made his List A debut against Gloucestershire in the 1990 NatWest Trophy. He played 8 further List A matches for Lincolnshire, the last coming against Berkshire in the 1st round of the 2002 Cheltenham & Gloucester Trophy, which was held in 2001. In his 9 matches, he scored 195 runs at an average of 24.37, with a high score of 39.
