= Richard Baigent =

English cricketer

Richard Baigent (born 23 March 1965) was an English cricketer. He is a right-handed batsman and a right-arm medium-pace and off-break bowler who played for Buckinghamshire. He was born in Amersham, Buckinghamshire.

Baigent started his career with Somerset Second XI, for whom he played in the Second XI Championship for three seasons. Baigent played for Buckinghamshire in the Minor Counties Championship between 1989 and 1995.

Baigent made a single List A appearance for the side, during the 1992 NatWest Trophy season, against Sussex. From the opening order, he scored 44 runs, the highest score of any Buckinghamshire player.

Following the end of his Minor Counties career, Baigent played for Todmorden in the Lancashire League between 1997 and 2004, winning the Worsley Cup with the team in 2000.
