= Timothy Standing =

English cricketer

Timothy Paul Andrew Standing (born 6 August 1964 in Hyde, Cheshire) is a former English cricketer. He was a right-handed batsman and wicket-keeper who played for Cheshire.

Standing, who debuted for Cheshire in the 1992 Holt Cup, and who played in the Minor Counties Championship between 1992 and 1993, made two List A appearances for the team, in the NatWest Trophy. From the lower order, he scored a duck in his first match, and two runs in his second.
