= Alex Barnett (cricketer) =

English cricketer

Personal information
- Full name: Alexander Anthony Barnett
- Born: 11 September 1970 (age 56); Málaga, Andalusia, Spain
- Batting: Right-handed
- Bowling: Slow left-arm orthodox
- Relatives: Charlie Barnett (great-uncle)

Domestic team information
- Years: Team
- 1988–1991: Middlesex
- 1992–1994: Lancashire
- 1995: Surrey
- 1996: Berkshire

Career statistics
Competition	First-class	List A
Matches	50	18
Runs scored	263	43
Batting average	9.39	14.33
100s/50s	0/0	0/0
Top score	38	22
Balls bowled	9,808	821
Wickets	113	14
Bowling average	45.93	44.78
5 wickets in innings	5	0
10 wickets in match	0	0
Best bowling	5/36	3/15
Catches/stumpings	14/–	3/–
- Source: Cricinfo, 7 October 2010

Alexander Anthony Barnett (born 11 September 1970) is a former English cricketer. Barnett was a right-handed batsman who bowled slow left-arm orthodox. He was born at Málaga, Spain.

== Cricket career ==
He represented teams in Middlesex, Lancashire and Surrey. In 50 first-class matches between 1988 and 1994, he took 113 wickets at an average of 45.93. He also played club cricket for Hampstead.

Barnett made his debut as a 17-year-old for Middlesex in 1988, but it was three years before when he played another first-class match. He only made two further appearances for Middlesex in the 1991 season. In the meantime, he had represented England in Youth Tests in Australia and at home against Pakistan.

He joined Lancashire in 1992 and was a regular member of the first-class team there for both the 1992 and 1993 seasons. He took 46 and 47 wickets in those seasons respectively, but at the cost of more than 40 runs per wicket. In 1994, he was supplanted as the regular spin bowler in the Lancashire team by Gary Yates, an off-spinner, and the county recruited Gary Keedy as a slow left-arm bowler at the end of the season and Barnett was released.

He played one List A match for Surrey in 1995 and also appeared in a single List A match for Berkshire in 1996.
