= Jonathan Robinson (English cricketer) =

English cricketer

Personal information
- Full name: Jonathan David Robinson
- Born: 3 August 1966 (age 60); Epsom, Surrey, England
- Batting: Left-handed
- Bowling: Right-arm medium
- Relatives: Peter Robinson (father)

Domestic team information
- Years: Team
- 1988–1992: Surrey
- 1994–1995: Bedfordshire

Career statistics
Competition	First-class	List A
Matches	33	55
Runs scored	1,020	772
Batting average	23.72	20.86
100s/50s	0/5	0/3
Top score	79	67
Balls bowled	1,923	1,553
Wickets	28	26
Bowling average	41.14	47.42
5 wickets in innings	0	0
10 wickets in match	0	0
Best bowling	3/22	3/46
Catches/stumpings	12/–	16/–
- Source: Cricinfo, 31 October 2011

Jonathan David Robinson (born 3 August 1966) is a former English cricketer. Robinson was a left-handed batsman who bowled right-arm medium pace. He was born at Epsom, Surrey.

Robinson made his first-class cricket debut for Surrey against the touring Sri Lankans in 1988. He made 30 further first-class appearances for the county, the last of which came against Nottinghamshire in the 1992 County Championship. In his 31 first-class appearances for the county, he scored 898 runs at an average of 23.02, with a high score of 79. This score, which was one of five first-class fifties he made, came against Lancashire in 1991. With the ball, he took 28 wickets at a bowling average of 41.14, with best figures of 3/22. He made his List A debut for Surrey against Nottinghamshire in the 1988 Refuge Assurance League. He made 53 further List A appearances for the county, the last of which came against Durham in the 1992 Sunday League. In his 54 List A appearances, he scored 705 runs at an average of 19.58, with a high score of 55 not out. This score, one of two fifties he made in that format for Surrey, came against Somerset in 1991. With the ball, he took 26 wickets at an average of 44.65, with best figures of 3/46.

He later joined Bedfordshire, making his debut for the county in the 1994 MCCA Knockout Trophy against Suffolk. He played Minor counties cricket for Bedfordshire in 1994 and 1995, making eight Minor Counties Championship appearances and three MCCA Knockout Trophy appearances. He also made a single List A appearance for Bedfordshire in the 1994 NatWest Trophy against Warwickshire. In this match, he bowled eleven wicket-less overs, while with the bat he a fluent 67 runs before being dismissed by Paul Smith. Warwickshire won the match by 197 runs. Robinson later made two first-class appearances for the Marylebone Cricket Club. The first in 1999 against Sri Lanka A saw him make scores of 44 and 33, while the second against New Zealand A saw him make scores of 10 and 35.

His father, Peter, made a solitary first-class appearance for L.C. Stevens' XI in 1961.
