= Barry Metcalf (cricketer) =

Welsh cricketer (born 1960)

Personal information
- Full name: Barry Metcalf
- Born: 30 September 1960 (age 66); Connah's Quay, Flintshire, Wales
- Batting: Left-handed

Domestic team information
- Years: Team
- 1991–1993: Wales Minor Counties

Career statistics
Competition	List A
Matches	1
Runs scored	30
Batting average	30.00
100s/50s	–/–
Top score	30
Balls bowled	–
Wickets	–
Bowling average	–
5 wickets in innings	–
10 wickets in match	–
Best bowling	–
Catches/stumpings	–/–
- Source: Cricinfo, 13 May 2011

Barry Metcalf (born 30 September 1960) is a former Welsh cricketer. Metcalf was a left-handed batsman. He was born in Connah's Quay, Flintshire.

Metcalf made his debut for Wales Minor Counties in the 1991 Minor Counties Championship against Cheshire. He played Minor counties cricket for Wales Minor Counties from 1991 to 1993, which included 7 Minor Counties Championship matches. He made his only List A appearance for Wales Minor Counties against Sussex in the NatWest Trophy. In this match, he scored 30 before being dismissed by Ian Salisbury.
