= Stephen Burrow =

English cricketer (born 1958)

Personal information
- Full name: Stephen Burrow
- Born: 13 January 1958 (age 68); Wokingham, Berkshire, England
- Batting: Right-handed
- Bowling: Right-arm medium

Domestic team information
- Years: Team
- 1999–2000: Hertfordshire
- 1988: Minor Counties
- 1984–1996: Buckinghamshire
- 1980–1983: Berkshire

Career statistics
Competition	LA
Matches	14
Runs scored	211
Batting average	19.18
100s/50s	–/1
Top score	57*
Balls bowled	704
Wickets	15
Bowling average	31.60
5 wickets in innings	–
10 wickets in match	–
Best bowling	3/32
Catches/stumpings	4/–
- Source: Cricinfo, 26 September 2010

Stephen Burrow (born 13 January 1958) is a former English cricketer. Burrow was a right-handed batsman who bowled right-arm medium pace. He was born at Wokingham, Berkshire.

Burrow made his Minor Counties Championship debut for Berkshire in 1980 against Buckinghamshire. From 1980 to 1983, he represented the county in 36 Championship matches, he last of which came against Buckinghamshire in the 1983 Championship. Burrow also made his debut in the MCCA Knockout Trophy competition for the county against Norfolk in 1983; this was his only Trophy appearance for Berkshire. Furthermore, his debut in List-A cricket came for Berkshire when they played Yorkshire in the 1983 NatWest Trophy.

In 1984, he joined Buckinghamshire, where he made his debut for the county in the Minor Counties Championship against Berkshire. From 1984 to 1996 he represented the county in 81 Championship matches, the last of which came against Northumberland in the 1996 competition. He also represented Buckinghamshire in the MCCA Knockout Trophy. His debut in that competition for the county came against Staffordshire in the 1985 Trophy. From 1985 to 1994, he represented the county in 23 Trophy matches, the last of which came against Lincolnshire. As well as playing Minor Counties cricket for Buckinghamshire, he also represented the county in List-A cricket. His List-A debut for them came against Somerset in the 1985 NatWest Trophy. From 1985 to 1993, he represented the county in 7 List-A matches, the last of which came against Leicestershire in the 1993 NatWest Trophy.

While representing Buckinghamshire, Burrow also played 2 List-A matches for a combined Minor Counties team against Yorkshire and Kent in the 1988 Benson & Hedges Cup.

In 1999, Burrow joined Hertfordshire. He represented the county in a single Minor Counties Championship match against Lincolnshire and a single MCCA Knockout Trophy match against the Middlesex Cricket Board. He also represented the county in 4 List-A matches, the first of which came against the Leicestershire Cricket Board in the 1999 NatWest Trophy, with his final List-A appearance coming against Cambridgeshire in the 2000 NatWest Trophy at Digswell Park, Welwyn Garden City.

In his combined List-A career, he scored 211 at a batting average of 19.18, with a single half century high score of 57*. With the ball he took 15 wickets at a bowling average of 31.60, with best figures of 3/32. In the field he took 4 catches.
