= Alastair Storie =

Scottish cricketer

Personal information
- Born: July 25, 1965 (age 61); Bishopbriggs
- Batting: Right-handed
- Bowling: Right-arm medium

Career statistics
Competition	First-class	List A
Matches	55	34
Runs scored	1,720	719
Batting average	23.24	27.65
100s/50s	2/7	0/7
Top score	106	97
Balls bowled	462	7
Wickets	3	0
Bowling average	76.66	–
5 wickets in innings	0	–
10 wickets in match	0	–
Best bowling	1/17	–
Catches/stumpings	36/–	7/–
- Source: CricketArchive, 3 February 2023

Alastair Caleb Storie (born 25 July 1965) is a former Scottish cricketer who has played first-class and List A cricket for Scotland and for several teams in England and South Africa.

A right-handed batsman, Storie played cricket in England with both Warwickshire and Northamptonshire as well as a season in South Africa with Free State. In total, he played 55 first class and 34 List A matches. He was the first Northamptonshire batsman to score a century on first-class debut. He also scored a century in his final first-class appearance (for Scotland). In 1988, Storie took 5 catches in an innings while playing for Warwickshire against Leicestershire at Edgbaston.
