= Alan Fordham =

English cricketer

Personal information
- Full name: Alan Fordham
- Born: 9 November 1964 (age 62); Bedford, Bedfordshire, England
- Batting: Right-handed
- Bowling: Right-arm medium

Domestic team information
- Years: Team
- 1982–1989: Bedfordshire
- 1986–1997: Northamptonshire

Career statistics
Competition	First-class	List A
Matches	167	170
Runs scored	10,939	4,805
Batting average	40.06	30.41
100s/50s	25/54	7/28
Top score	206*	132*
Balls bowled	431	27
Wickets	4	1
Bowling average	74.25	16.00
5 wickets in innings	–	–
10 wickets in match	–	–
Best bowling	1/0	1/3
Catches/stumpings	117/–	43/–
- Source: Cricinfo, 15 June 2022

Alan Fordham (born 9 November 1964 in Bedford) is a former English cricketer. He was a right-handed batsman and he played in 167 first-class matches for Northamptonshire County Cricket Club between 1986 and 1997. He finished his career with a batting average of 40.06, and scored 25 centuries. His highest score was 206 against Yorkshire County Cricket Club at Headingley Cricket Ground in 1990. His best season was 1991 with 1,840 runs at 47.17.

In Limited-overs cricket he is best remembered for winning the Man of the Match award in the final of the 1992 NatWest Trophy at Lord's Cricket Ground, when Northamptonshire defeated Leicestershire County Cricket Club.

After retiring from cricket, in 1997 he took up the post of Head of Cricket Operations (first-class) at the England and Wales Cricket Board.

Fordham was educated at Bedford Modern School and the University of Durham, where he was awarded a palatinate for cricket in 1986.
