= Graham Savin =

English cricketer

Personal information
- Full name: Graham Paul Savin
- Born: 22 September 1964 (age 62); Oxford, Oxfordshire, England
- Batting: Left-handed
- Bowling: Left-arm medium

Domestic team information
- Years: Team
- 1986–2002: Oxfordshire

Career statistics
Competition	List A
Matches	11
Runs scored	223
Batting average	24.77
100s/50s	–/–
Top score	41
Balls bowled	618
Wickets	8
Bowling average	49.87
5 wickets in innings	–
10 wickets in match	–
Best bowling	3/33
Catches/stumpings	5/–
- Source: Cricinfo, 20 May 2011

Graham Paul Savin (born 22 September 1964) is a former English cricketer. Savin was a left-handed batsman who bowled left-arm medium pace. He was born in Oxford, Oxfordshire.

Savin made his debut for Oxfordshire in the 1986 Minor Counties Championship against Berkshire. Savin played Minor counties cricket for Oxfordshire from 1986 to 2002, which included 99 Minor Counties Championship matches and 28 MCCA Knockout Trophy matches. He made his List A debut against Gloucestershire in the 1989 NatWest Trophy. He played 10 further List A matches, the last coming against the Lancashire Cricket Board in the 1st round of the 2003 Cheltenham & Gloucester Trophy which was held in 2002. In his 11 List A matches he scored 223 runs at a batting average of 24.77, with a high score of 41. With the ball he took 8 wickets at a bowling average of 49.87, with best figures of 3/33.
