= Philip Berry =

English cricketer

Philip John Berry (born 28 December 1966) was an English first-class cricketer, who has played for both Yorkshire County Cricket Club and Durham County Cricket Club. In 26 first-class matches, he scored a total of 516 runs at 20.64, and took 39 wickets with his right arm off breaks at a cost of 45.02.

Berry made his first-class debut for his home county in 1986, during which year he also played for England Young Cricketers against Sri Lanka at Trent Bridge. He played for Yorkshire until 1990, but made just seven first-class appearances, before playing for Durham, appearing in nineteen matches from 1992 to 1994.

Although his overall record is modest, Berry did enjoy one spectacular game for Durham against Middlesex County Cricket Club at Lord's in July 1992, during which he recorded both his highest score and best bowling figures. In the home team's first innings of 366 he dismissed the first seven batsmen in the order, including Desmond Haynes and Mike Gatting, at a cost of 113 and then scored 76 out of Durham's reply of 232, more than twice as much as any other batsman. Middlesex went on to record a victory by 175 runs, but even at the end Berry was defiant, left unbeaten on 14 as Durham were bowled out for 118.

In List A cricket, he scored nine runs at an average of 7.00 and took three wickets at a cost of 89.66.
