= Steve Barwick =

Welsh cricketer (1960–2026)

Personal information
- Full name: Stephen Royston Barwick
- Born: 6 September 1960; Neath, Glamorgan, Wales
- Died: 11 August 2026 (aged 65)
- Nickname: Baz
- Height: 6 ft 2 in (1.88 m)
- Batting: Right-handed
- Bowling: Right-arm medium

Domestic team information
- Years: Team
- 1981–1996: Glamorgan
- 1997–2001: Wales Minor Counties

Career statistics
Competition	First-class	List A
Matches	212	276
Runs scored	873	360
Batting average	6.76	8.18
100s/50s	0/0	0/0
Top score	30	48*
Balls bowled	36,576	12,593
Wickets	456	325
Bowling average	35.49	26.36
5 wickets in innings	10	5
10 wickets in match	1	0
Best bowling	8/42	6/28
Catches/stumpings	47/–	39/–
- Source: Cricinfo, 13 July 2011

Stephen Royston Barwick (6 September 1960 – 11 August 2026) was a Welsh cricketer. Barwick was a right-handed batsman who began his career a right-arm medium-fast bowler, before adding variation in the form of changes of pace and off cutters, with his restyled bowling being termed by fellow professionals like Andy Caddick as the "slowest seam bowling around". Playing for Glamorgan for 18 seasons, he took 768 wickets in all formats of the game.

== Glamorgan ==
Born in Neath, Glamorgan, Barwick made his first-class debut in 1981 against Oxford University, a season in which he also made his List A debut against Essex. Barwick played as a bowler, at the beginning of his career he bowled as a fast-medium bowler. A mainstay of the Glamorgan side for the best part of 15 years, Barwick made over 200 first-class and 268 List A appearances for the county, establishing bowling partnerships with the likes of Rodney Ontong, Steve Watkin and Roland Lefebvre. As his career developed, so too did his bowling, with Barwick sacrificing pace to introduce more off cutters into his bowling array in the early 1990s, much like Don Shepherd. An effective bowler at first-class level, "Basil", as he was known, took 456 wickets in first-class cricket for Glamorgan, which came at a respectable average of 35.49, in the process making 10 five wicket hauls and a single ten wicket haul in a match. He took his best innings bowling figures of 8/42 in the 1983 season against Worcestershire. His most successful season in first-class cricket came in 1989, when Barwick took 64 wickets at 30.43 a piece, it was only the second and final time in his career that he would pass 50 wickets in a season, having previously taken 50 exactly in 1954. Barwick batted as a tailender, but was nonetheless capable of blocking an end. He scored 873 runs at a batting average of 6.76, with a high score of 30. His county cap came in 1987.

His bowling in List A cricket was more successful, which was aided by his change of bowling style. So rare in county cricket was it, that opposition players out of respect for Barwick coined his deliveries "Basils". In 268 List A matches for Glamorgan, he took 312 wickets at an average of 26.68. He took a five wicket haul on 5 occasions, with his best figures of 6/28 coming against Derbyshire in the 1993 AXA Equity & Law League, with it being on the back of these performances that cricket writers began touting for his selection in the England team to play One Day Internationals. The 1993 season was also the same season in which he won his only silverware with Glamorgan, with the county being triumphant in the AXA Equity & Law League. As his career with Glamorgan entered its final years and he found his first-class opportunities limited as the county sought more wicket-taking bowlers in the County Championship, Barwick was still an ever present member of the Glamorgan limited-overs squad. His subtle change of pace and the introduction of off cutters to his bowling greatly benefited his bowling in the early 1990s, with Barwick taking over 20 wickets a season for six consecutive seasons. His best was the 1993 season, in which he took 35 wickets at an average of 21.11. His 312 wickets for the county remain the 3rd most wickets for Glamorgan in List A cricket (behind Malcolm Nash and Robert Croft). It was in this format of the game that his highest score with the bat was to come, a score of 48 not out against Worcestershire in the 1989 Refuge Assurance League. Overall, he scored 349 runs at an average of 8.30. Awarded his benefit season in 1995, he was released by Glamorgan at the end of the 1996 season.

== Wales Minor Counties ==
Barwick joined Wales Minor Counties in 1997, making his debut for the team against Devon in the Minor Counties Championship. He played Minor counties cricket for the team from 1997 to 2001, making 21 Minor Counties Championship appearances and 7 MCCA Knockout Trophy appearances. His first List A appearance for the team came in the 1998 NatWest Trophy against Nottinghamshire. Barwick played a further 7 List A appearances for the team, the last of which came against Leicestershire in the 2001 Cheltenham & Gloucester Trophy. In his 8 List A matches for Wales Minor Counties, he took 13 wickets at an average of 18.53, with best figures of 3/44.

== Death ==
Barwick died on 11 August 2026, aged 65.
