= Kevin Shine =

English cricketer and coach

Personal information
- Full name: Kevin James Shine
- Born: 22 February 1969 (age 57); Bracknell, Berkshire, England
- Batting: Right-handed
- Bowling: Right-arm fast-medium
- Role: Bowler

Domestic team information
- Years: Team
- 1989–1993: Hampshire
- 1994–1995: Middlesex
- 1996–1998: Somerset

Career statistics
Competition	First-class	List A
Matches	102	33
Runs scored	564	46
Batting average	9.55	23.00
100s/50s	0/0	0/0
Top score	40	38*
Balls bowled	13,897	1,416
Wickets	249	38
Bowling average	36.09	35.26
5 wickets in innings	12	0
10 wickets in match	2	0
Best bowling	8/47	4/31
Catches/stumpings	21/–	3/–
- Source: Cricinfo, 21 December 2009

Kevin James Shine (born 22 February 1969) is a former first-class cricketer and former coach of Somerset County Cricket Club, and was the fast-bowling coach for the England cricket team from 2006 until 2019. In November 2019 he joined Nottinghamshire County Cricket Club as an Assistant Coach.

His first-class career ran from 1989 to 1998, during which he played for Hampshire, Middlesex and Somerset. He took 249 first-class wickets at an average of 36.09, including 55 in the 1997 season. His best innings figures were 8 for 47 for Hampshire against Lancashire in 1992.

== Coaching career ==
After retiring as a player due to injury, he served as coach of Somerset from 2001 to 2004. The team won the C&G Trophy in his first year in charge. He subsequently served as the director of the Somerset academy, and was appointed England's fast-bowling coach from March 2006 in succession to Troy Cooley. In 2019 he left the ECB and became assistant head coach at Nottinghamshire County Cricket Club.
