= Adrian Dale =

South African cricketer (born 1968)

Adrian Dale (born 24 October 1968) is a former South African cricketer, right-handed batsman, and right-arm medium-pace bowler who scored over 12,500 first-class runs and took over 200 first-class wickets. He played exclusively for Glamorgan, playing with the team between 1989 and 2004. His only other first-class games were when he was selected to tour South Africa with England A in 1992. Adrian was born in South Africa but raised in Wales. In 2001 his wife gave birth to Jessica Dale followed by Luke John Dale (2002) and Georgia (2006).

While with Glamorgan, he won the Young Player of the Year award in 1991, a year before winning a cap for his county. He was to win the more prestigious title of Player of the Year in the two consecutive years of 2000 and 2001 and was to have a benefit season in 2002 which would raise £113,000. He was part of the 1997 County Championship winning team. In 1993, together with the great Viv Richards, he was part of a Glamorgan record 425 partnership, against Middlesex.

Most recently, he participated in the Twenty20 Cup matches of 2003 and 2004, finishing his career by hitting the winning runs in the crucial game of Glamorgan's 2004 totesport League championship victory.

He has now moved to New Zealand and works for the Auckland Cricket Association. In February 2020, he was named in New Zealand's squad for the Over-50s Cricket World Cup in South Africa. However, the tournament was cancelled during the third round of matches due to the coronavirus pandemic.
