= Mike Watkinson =

English cricketer (born 1961)

Personal information
- Full name: Michael Watkinson
- Born: 1 August 1961 (age 65); Westhoughton, Lancashire, England
- Batting: Right-handed
- Bowling: Right-arm medium Right-arm off-break
- Role: All-rounder
- Relatives: Liam Watkinson (son)

International information
- National side: England (1995–1996)
- Test debut (cap 575): 27 July 1995 v West Indies
- Last Test: 4 January 1996 v South Africa
- ODI debut (cap 134): 13 January 1996 v South Africa

Career statistics
Competition	Test	ODI	FC	LA
Matches	4	1	308	374
Runs scored	167	–	10,939	5,398
Batting average	33.39	–	26.68	22.97
100s/50s	0/1	–	11/50	2/20
Top score	82*	–	161	130
Balls bowled	672	54	47,808	16,057
Wickets	10	0	739	381
Bowling average	34.79	–	33.77	31.89
5 wickets in innings	0	–	27	3
10 wickets in match	0	–	3	0
Best bowling	3/64	–	8/30	5/44
Catches/stumpings	1/–	0/–	156/–	98/–
- Source: , 4 August 2013

Michael Watkinson (born 1 August 1961) is an English former cricketer who played four Test matches and one One Day International in the mid-1990s. A right-handed batsman and right-arm bowler of either medium-pace or off-spin, he was instrumental in Lancashire County Cricket Club's successes in the 1990s, later becoming the county's director of cricket.

He showed promise in cricket, football,golf, and basketball.

Watkinson attended Westhoughton County Primary School, and Rivington and Blackrod High School. During this time he was a regular player at Westhoughton Cricket Club in the Bolton Cricket League, where he drew attention from Teddy Gerrard, a coach at the club.

From these beginnings, and following cricketing predecessors from the club (four of the Tyldesley family made the ground staff at Old Trafford, with Dick Tyldesley reaching international level with England) Watkinson emulated the local heroes, playing for Lancashire and England.

== Domestic cricket ==
As a county cricketer Watkinson was part of a Lancashire with a strong record in List A cricket. It was a team featuring many internationals, including Michael Atherton, Neil Fairbrother, Graeme Fowler, Peter Martin, and the Pakistan star Wasim Akram; later he would also play alongside Andrew Flintoff and Muttiah Muralitharan. Watkinson helped Lancashire to win both the Benson and Hedges Cup and the NatWest Bank Trophy in 1990, winning the man of the match award in the final of the former.

He was captain of the Lancashire side from 1992 to 1997. In 1996 under his leadership the county repeated the double of the Benson and Hedges Cup and the NatWest Bank Trophy. He also helped them to win the Benson and Hedges Cup in 1995.

== International cricket ==
Watkinson made his Test cricket debut against the West Indies in 1995 at Old Trafford, when Atherton was England captain. He was thus placed in the unusual position, in his debut on his county home ground, of being captained by a county colleague of whom he was usually the captain in county cricket.

England won his first test, Watkinson contributing 37 runs and five wickets, three of them in the second innings. Atherton later praised Watkinson's bowling, saying: "He was a bit nervous in the first innings but bowled exceptionally in the second".

The highlight of Watkinson's international career came in the next test when he made his highest Test score, 82 not out, in an unlikely last-wicket stand with an injured Richard Illingworth to ensure England held the West Indies to a draw. According to Christopher Martin-Jenkins, this result was assured by "the resourceful batting of Lancashire`s cool, competent and battle-hardened captain and Illingworth`s courageous defiance of doctor`s orders to share in England`s largest last-wicket stand since Bob Willis and Peter Willey put on 117 in 1980".

Picked to tour South Africa, he had a more low-key experience and was not picked to play international cricket again.

== After retirement ==
After retirement from 2002 he took the position of coach with Lancashire, from 2008 being elevated to the position of Director of cricket.

In October 2014, Watkinson announced that he was to resign from his role as Director following a disappointing season, which saw the club relegated from the top flight of County Championship Cricket, this ended his 32-year association with Lancashire.

In December 2014, Watkinson became director of cricket at Manchester Grammar School.

His son, Liam Watkinson, has played four first-class matches for Leeds/Bradford MCCU.
