= David Ligertwood =

English cricketer

Personal information
- Full name: David Ligertwood
- Born: May 16, 1969 (age 57); Oxford, England
- Batting: Right-handed
- Role: Wicket-keeper

Domestic team information
- Years: Team
- 1990–1991: Hertfordshire
- 1992: Surrey
- 1995–1996: Durham
- Source: CricketArchive, 6 June 2025

David Ligertwood (born 16 May 1969) is an English former cricketer. He was born in Oxford, but educated in Australia. Unlikely to break into the South Australian Sheffield Shield squad, Ligertwood decided to move to England for a better opportunity to play first-class cricket. He was a right-handed batsman and a wicket-keeper who played first-class cricket between 1992 and 1996.

Ligertwood's county cricket career began during the 1990 Minor Counties Championship season, in which he played for Hertfordshire. He made a half-century on his Minor Counties debut, playing half a dozen games during the season in total. A regular starter in the minor league during the 1991 season, he was noticed late on in the season by the Surrey board, and by the opening of the 1992 season, was playing regular first-class cricket.

Surrey finished a disappointing thirteenth in the table during the 1992 season, a dramatic drop from their fifth-place of the previous season, and Ligertwood did not play any further first-class cricket until being picked up by Durham three years later, having spent a short amount of time in the Second XIs of Worcestershire and Essex.

Ligertwood became a regular first-class starter for the first time during the 1995 season, though Durham had a disappointing season, finishing seventeenth in the County Championship table. 1996 showed further signs of decline, as Durham went the whole season without recording a victory and bottom of the County Championship.

Ligertwood did not make any further first-class appearances in his career, though he remained in cricket during the 1997 season, playing on an occasional basis in the Second XI Championship and Second XI Trophy.
