= Neil Prigent =

English cricketer (born 1964)

Neil Prigent (born 11 July 1964) was an English cricketer. He was a left-handed batsman and a left-arm medium-pace bowler who played for Wiltshire. He was born in Uxbridge.

Prigent, who represented Wiltshire in Minor Counties cricket between 1990 and 1994, made a single List A appearance for the side, during the 1993 season, against Durham. He scored 14 not out in the match, and took two wickets with the ball, those of Ian Botham and Paul Parker.
