= Tony Murphy (cricketer) =

English cricketer (born 1962)

Personal information
- Full name: Anthony John Murphy
- Born: 6 August 1962 (age 64); Withington, Lancashire, England
- Batting: Right-handed
- Bowling: Right-arm medium-fast

Domestic team information
- Years: Team
- 2000: Surrey Cricket Board
- 1993–1999: Cheshire
- 1989–1994: Surrey
- 1986–1997: Minor Counties
- 1985/86: Central Districts
- 1985–1988: Lancashire
- 1984–1988: Cheshire

Career statistics
| Competition | First-class | List A |
|---|---|---|
| Matches | 84 | 95 |
| Runs scored | 323 | 75 |
| Batting average | 6.87 | 5.76 |
| 100s/50s | –/– | –/– |
| Top score | 38 | 18 |
| Balls bowled | 14,931 | 4,682 |
| Wickets | 208 | 109 |
| Bowling average | 38.14 | 32.00 |
| 5 wickets in innings | 6 | 1 |
| 10 wickets in match | – | – |
| Best bowling | 6/97 | 6/26 |
| Catches/stumpings | 17/– | 5/– |
- Source: Cricinfo, 2 December 2011

Anthony John Murphy (born 6 August 1962) is a former English cricketer. Murphy was a right-handed batsman who bowled right-arm medium-fast. He was born at Withington, Lancashire.

== First-class career ==
Murphy made his first team debut in county cricket for Cheshire in the 1984 Minor Counties Championship against Shropshire, having previous to that played for the Lancashire Second XI. In 1985, Murphy made his first-class debut for Lancashire against Leicestershire. He played a further first-class match that season against Worcestershire, before embarking on a playing stint in New Zealand during the English winter. He played for Central districts during the 1985/86 New Zealand season, making three first-class appearances and making two List A appearances against Canterbury and Northern Districts in the 1985/86 Shell Cup.

Returning to England, Murphy made his only List A appearance for Lancashire against Hampshire in the 1986 John Player Special League, with Murphy taking the wicket of Robin Smith. In first-class cricket, Murphy made twelve appearances for Lancashire from 1985 to 1988. A bowler, he took a total of 24 wickets at an average of 41.37, with best figures of 4/115. Due to his infrequent appearances for Lancashire, Murphy also continued to play for Cheshire in Minor counties cricket during this period, which led to him being selected to play for a combined Minor Counties team in 1986 in a first-class match against the touring New Zealanders.

He left Lancashire at the end of the 1988 season and proceeded to join Surrey for the 1989 season, making his debut for the county against Gloucestershire in the Refuge Assurance League. His first-class debut for Surrey came shortly after against Warwickshire in the County Championship.

He played first-class cricket for Surrey from 1989 to 1994, making 67 appearances, with his first-class appearances for the county were more frequent early in his spell at the county. He took a total of 175 wickets at an average of 38.09, with best figures of 6/97. His best season was in 1989 when he took 65 wickets at an average of 30.89. He also took his career best figures of 6/97 in this season, against Derbyshire. In List A cricket, Murphy made 89 appearances in that format for Surrey from 1989 to 1994. In these matches, he took a total of 111 wickets at an average of 28.67, with best figures of 6/26. These figures represented his only limited-overs five wicket haul and came against Glamorgan in the quarter-final of the 1994 NatWest Trophy. He left Surrey at the end of the 1994 season.

== Later career ==
Murphy last appeared for Cheshire while still playing for Surrey, when he appeared in the final of the 1993 Minor Counties Championship against Staffordshire, which Cheshire lost by 5 wickets. After leaving Surrey, he rejoined Cheshire, making between 1995 and 1999 a total of 35 Minor Counties Championship appearances, to bring his overall number of appearances in that competition for the county to 51.

In that same period he made twelve MCCA Knockout Trophy appearances, bringing his total number of appearances in that competition to sixteen. He played his first List A match for Cheshire against Essex in the 1995 NatWest Trophy, with him making three further List A for the county, the last of which came against Kent in the 1999 NatWest Trophy. He took 6 wickets in these six match, which came at an average of 23.66, with best figures of 4/48. Murphy was once again selected to play for a combined Minor Counties team, when in the 1997 Benson & Hedges Cup he made three appearances.

Having left Cheshire at the end of the 1999 season, he played for the Surrey Cricket Board in three matches in the 2000 MCCA Knockout Trophy. Murphy kept his connection with Surrey, serving as a committee member at the county. He was appointed its non-executive director of cricket in July 2010.
