= Jason Ratcliffe =

English cricketer

Personal information
- Full name: Jason David Ratcliffe
- Born: 19 June 1969 (age 57); Solihull, Warwickshire
- Batting: Right-handed
- Bowling: Right-arm medium
- Role: Batsman

Domestic team information
- Years: Team
- 1988–1994: Warwickshire
- 1995–2002: Surrey

Career statistics
Competition	First-class	List A
Matches	136	110
Runs scored	6,561	1,856
Batting average	28.52	23.20
100s/50s	5/38	1/10
Top score	135	105
Balls bowled	1,644	1,635
Wickets	27	40
Bowling average	33.74	31.07
5 wickets in innings	1	0
10 wickets in match	0	0
Best bowling	6/48	4/44
Catches/stumpings	68/–	28/–
- Source: CricketArchive, 12 July 2013

Jason David Ratcliffe (born 19 June 1969) is a retired English first-class cricketer. A right-handed batsman and occasional right-arm medium-pace bowler, Ratcliffe played County Championship and domestic one-day cricket for Warwickshire between 1988 and 1994 and then for Surrey from 1995 until 2002. His father, David Ratcliffe, also played for Warwickshire between 1957 and 1968.

== Playing career ==
During his career, Ratcliffe received winner's medals for all the domestic competitions in County Cricket. He made over one-hundred appearances in both first-class and one-day matches, scoring 6,500 first-class runs with five centuries, and a further 1,856 runs in the shorter format. He also took sixty-seven wickets across all forms of the game with his part-time medium-pace bowling. Following the recurrence of a persistent knee injury in 2002, he retired.

== Post-playing career ==
=== Professional Cricketers Association ===
Following the end of his playing career he became an administrator, rising to assistant chief executive of the Professional Cricketers' Association in 2008, at the time that lawsuits were arising between the Indian Premier League and the England Cricket Board.

Ratcliffe's innovative work for the PCA included setting up the Association's Mind Matters, series to raise awareness of mental health and wellbeing issues. He encouraged a number of high-profile players including Marcus Trescothick, Andrew Flintoff, Mike Yardy, Iain O’Brien, Tim Ambrose, Graeme Fowler and Monty Panesar to talk openly about their battles with depression and other mental health matters, and in the process created the organisation first Mental Health Charter. In particular, Ratcliffe has thanked Marcus Trescothick for speaking publicly about his mental health, stating that "sport and many others are indebted to him for stepping forward and giving others the confidence to follow his lead".

In a Radio Times interview, on 13 February 2015, Andrew Flintoff said, “England, and especially the Players Cricket Association, should be commended so highly for their work with mental health issues. There’s a guy there called Jason Ratcliffe (PCA Assistant Chief Executive), who is leading the way, not just in cricket but in everyday life for people.” Likewise, in 2017, the former international England cricketer and Chief Cricket Correspondent for The Times, Michael Atherton praised Ratcliffe for playing a "huge role" in recognising the importance of mental health and wellbeing for players at the end their careers to the extent that "all professional cricketers owe him ... a huge debt of gratitude".

Ratcliffe was also the initiator for the establishment of the PCA's Confidential Helpline/Support network in 2007, a service available for all past and present professional cricketers in England and Wales offering them a 24 hours-a-day, seven-days-a-week support network.

The PCA Benevolent Fund, a charitable trust set up to help past and present cricketers and their dependants, also benefitted from Ratcliffe's support and vision. The Benevolent Fund provided practical support in a number of areas including operations for Jack Bond, Brian Brain, Graham Barlow and Alan Rayment and the provision of specially-adapted vehicles for Winston Davis and Jamie Hood, who were both paralysed in accidents away from the game.

In addition, as a trustee of the Tom Maynard Trust, Ratcliffe led ‘The Big Bike Ride’ fundraising challenge, on behalf of the Trust and the Benevolent Fund, raising over £400,000 to date.

The PCA also helped to establish a network of Personal Development and Welfare Officers, under Ratcliffe's leadership to help provide players with practical support and advice to help smooth the transition to life after cricket.

Development of the PCA's Most Valuable Player Rankings (MVP), was devised and developed under Ratcliffe, leading to a million pound sponsorship by FTI 2010-2103 and most recently in April 2016, the launch of a ground breaking ECB/PCA joint venture to have players picked for a North v South 50 over challenge via the rankings system, an initiative conceived by Andrew Strauss to build prominence for the 2019 ICC World Cup.

Ratcliffe also worked closely to reintegrate Mervyn Westfield back into cricket after the former Essex fast bowler had served a jail sentence and been suspended from all cricket for his involvement in spot fixing. Westfield spoke to first year county players about his experiences at PCA Rookie Camps and also accompanied Ratcliffe on educational visits to South Africa in November 2015

Ratcliffe also supported Chris Lewis, the former England all-rounder and a teammate at Surrey, while he was serving a long prison sentence for attempting to smuggle liquid cocaine into the UK. After he was released from prison, Lewis accompanied the PCA on a series of pre-season county visits in early 2016 where he spoke to current players about his experiences.

After several years of negotiating playing contracts, mediating disputes with players and counties, in September 2016 The Cricketer Magazine named Ratcliffe at 27 in its Power List stating: “Ratcliffe is the closest thing English cricket has to a union boss. If an issue arises between a player and his employer, he is likely to be the first port of call. So many professionals have praised him for helping them find a path after cricket, or getting through personal difficulties; he encouraged Marcus Trescothick, Mike Yardy and Monty Panesar to bring their mental-health issues into the public domain and break down and old taboo."

Ratcliffe also sits on the ECB's Rule and Regulations cricket committee and is a member of the ECB's Cricket Discipline Commission.

In October 2016, it was announced that Ratcliffe was to leave the PCA after fourteen years of working for the organisation.

=== JATA Management ===
In 2017, after leaving the Professional Cricketers' Association, Ratcliffe created JATA Management. Representing the likes of Craig Overton, Tom Banton, Joe Denly and Danny Briggs
