= Nicholas Adams (cricketer) =

English cricketer (born 1967)

Personal information
- Full name: Nicholas Jack Adams
- Born: 1 March 1967 (age 59); Bedford, Bedfordshire, England
- Batting: Right-handed
- Bowling: Right-arm medium

Domestic team information
- Years: Team
- 1985–1996: Cambridgeshire
- 1993: Minor Counties
- 1997: Norfolk
- 1998–2001: Cambridgeshire
- 2002: Huntingdonshire

Career statistics
Competition	List A
Matches	13
Runs scored	306
Batting average	27.81
100s/50s	1/1
Top score	104*
Balls bowled	239
Wickets	4
Bowling average	47.50
5 wickets in innings	0
10 wickets in match	0
Best bowling	1/10
Catches/stumpings	2/-
- Source: Cricinfo, 8 July 2010

Nicholas Jack Adams (born 1 March 1967) is an English former cricketer. He played as a right-handed batsman who bowled right-arm medium pace. He was born at Bedford in 1967.

Adams made his debut for Cambridgeshire in the 1985 Minor Counties Championship against Norfolk. From 1985 to 2001, he represented the county in 82 Minor Counties Championship matches and 24 MCCA Knockout Trophy matches.

He made his List A debut for Cambridgeshire against Derbyshire in the 1st round of the 1987 NatWest Trophy. From 1987 to 2001, he represented the county in 11 List-A matches. His final List-A match for the county against the Derbyshire Cricket Board in the 2001 Cheltenham & Gloucester Trophy.

As well as playing List A cricket for Cambridgeshire, Adams represented a number of other teams in one-day cricket. In 1993 he played a single List A match for Minor Counties in the 1993 Benson & Hedges Cup against Durham. In 1997, he represented the Norfolk in a single match against Warwickshire in the 1997 NatWest Trophy, as well as a single Minor Counties Championship fixture for the county against Northumberland and 2 MCCA Knockout Trophy matches against Wiltshire and Northumberland. In 2002, he played a single List-A match for Huntingdonshire against Cheshire in the 2003 Cheltenham & Gloucester Trophy.

In his 13 career List A matches, he scored 306 runs at a batting average of 27.81, with a single century and half century and a high score of 104 not out against Northamptonshire. In the field he took two catches. With the ball he took four wickets at a bowling average of 47.50, with best figures of 1/10.
