= Phil Robinson (cricketer) =

English cricketer (born 1963)

Personal information
- Full name: Phillip Edward Robinson
- Born: 3 August 1963 (age 63); Keighley, Yorkshire, England
- Batting: Right-handed
- Bowling: Left-arm medium

Career statistics
Competition	First-class	List A
Matches	159	198
Runs scored	7,617	4,292
Batting average	33.70	25.85
100s/50s	7/51	1/22
Top score	189	138
Balls bowled	296	–
Wickets	3	–
Bowling average	109.66	–
5 wickets in innings	0	–
10 wickets in match	0	–
Best bowling	1/10	–
Catches/stumpings	130/–	76/–
- Source: CricketArchive, 15 April 2023

Phil Robinson (born 3 August 1963), born Phillip Edward Robinson, is an English former first-class cricketer, who played for Yorkshire County Cricket Club and Leicestershire.

Robinson was born at Keighley in Yorkshire, made his first-class debut for his native county in 1984, and played 132 first-class games for the Tykes until 1991, averaging 35.84, passing 1,000 runs in a season on three occasions. He then moved to Leicestershire and played up to 1995, but was somewhat less successful, playing 27 matches without a century, for an average of 23.72. His best first-class score of 189, came in a Roses Match in 1991, in his penultimate match for Yorkshire.

After leaving the first-class scene, he managed Leicestershire's Second XI for four years before moving to New Zealand. Following the Christchurch earthquakes his family relocated to Queensland where he currently works as a Coach and Talent specialist for Queensland Cricket (Based in their Townsville office).
