= Philip Oxley =

English cricketer (born 1965)

Personal information
- Full name: Philip John Oxley
- Born: 7 April 1965 (age 61); Reading, Berkshire, England
- Batting: Right-handed
- Bowling: Right-arm off break

Domestic team information
- Years: Team
- 1988–1997: Berkshire

Career statistics
Competition	LA
Matches	6
Runs scored	111
Batting average	37.00
100s/50s	–/–
Top score	49
Balls bowled	246
Wickets	7
Bowling average	37.42
5 wickets in innings	1
10 wickets in match	–
Best bowling	5/87
Catches/stumpings	–/–
- Source: Cricinfo, 20 September 2010

Philip John Oxley (born 7 April 1965) is a former English cricketer. Oxley was a right-handed batsman who bowled right-arm off break. He was born at Reading, Berkshire.

Oxley made his Minor Counties Championship debut for Berkshire in 1988 against Oxfordshire. From 1988 to 1995, he represented the county in 50 Minor Counties Championship matches, the last of which came in the 1995 Championship when Berkshire played Cornwall. Oxley also played in the MCCA Knockout Trophy for Berkshire. His debut in that competition came in 1990 when Berkshire played Buckinghamshire. From 1990 to 1997, he represented the county in 10 Trophy matches, the last of which came when Berkshire played Shropshire in the 1997 MCCA Knockout Trophy.

Additionally, he also played List-A matches for Berkshire. His List-A debut for the county came against Middlesex in the 1990 NatWest Trophy. From 1990 to 1996, he represented the county in 6 List-A matches, with his final List-A match coming in the 1996 NatWest Trophy when Berkshire played Leicestershire at the Grace Road, Leicester. In his 6 matches, he scored 111 runs at a batting average of 37.00, with a high score of 49. With the ball he took 7 wickets at a bowling average of 37.24, with a single five wicket haul of 5/87 against Kent in the 1994 NatWest Trophy.
