= Tim Boon =

English cricketer (born 1961)

Personal information
- Full name: Timothy James Boon
- Born: 1 November 1961 (age 65); Balby, Doncaster, Yorkshire, England
- Batting: Right-handed
- Bowling: Right-arm medium
- Role: Batter

Domestic team information
- Years: Team
- 1980–1995: Leicestershire
- 1991/92: Natal
- 1996–1997: Norfolk

Career statistics
Competition	First-class	List A
Matches	248	173
Runs scored	11,820	3,602
Batting average	31.39	27.08
100s/50s	14/68	3/17
Top score	144	135*
Balls bowled	667	114
Wickets	11	2
Bowling average	51.18	60.00
5 wickets in innings	0	0
10 wickets in match	0	0
Best bowling	3/40	1/23
Catches/stumpings	124/–	45/–
- Source: CricketArchive, 16 November 2024

Timothy James Boon (born 1 November 1961) is an English former cricketer who was also the coach of Leicestershire County Cricket Club.

Born at Balby in Yorkshire, Boon had a successful playing career predominantly with Leicestershire. However he started his young playing career with his local club Warmsworth CC. He played his first game in 1980 and his last in 1995 and passed 1000 runs seven times. He had a spell with KwaZulu-Natal in South Africa, and later played for Norfolk.

In recent years Boon has made more of an impression as a coach. He was named the England U-19 coach in 1999. Later Boon was given the job of England's video analyst and was instrumental in helping England win the 2005 Ashes series.

Boon was offered the job of Leicestershire coach in 2006 as a successor to James Whitaker. He went on to be the coach of the England Under 19 Cricket Team. In 2017 he was appointed by the England and Wales Cricket Board as a cricket liaison officer.
