= Warwickshire County Cricket Club in 1994 =

English cricket team season

Warwickshire County Cricket Club
1994 season
- Coach: Bob Woolmer
- Captain: Dermot Reeve
- Overseas player: Brian Lara
- County Championship: Winners
- Sunday League: Winners
- Natwest Trophy: Runners-up
- Benson & Hedges Cup: Winners
- Most runs: Brian Lara (2,066)
- Most wickets: Tim Munton (81)
- Most catches: Dermot Reeve (18)
- Most wicket-keeping dismissals: Keith Piper (66)

Warwickshire County Cricket Club in 1994 achieved the unprecedented feat of winning three trophies in an English domestic season. The treble included titles in the County Championship, Sunday League and Benson & Hedges Cup while the grand slam was narrowly missed as they lost to Worcestershire in the final of the Natwest Trophy. Wisden described it as the 'most remarkable season by any side in the history of county cricket'.

Warwickshire, captained by Dermot Reeve and coached by Bob Woolmer, won the County Championship by 42 points from second placed Leicestershire, the largest winning margin since 1979. During the 17 match season Warwickshire won eleven and lost just once, with the remainder draws. The solitary defeat came at home against Nottinghamshire when they lost by an innings. In one-day competitions they won 21 of their 26 matches.

The signing of Brian Lara as overseas player played a key role in the success, arriving days after recording a Test record innings of 375 he began the season with six centuries in seven innings which culminated against Durham County Cricket Club when he scored a first-class record 501 not out. He finished the season with nine centuries and a total of 2,066 runs at an average of 89.82, topping both run scoring and average lists for the season. His one-day performances paled in comparison, he scored 634 runs at 28.81 with a best of 81.

== Background ==
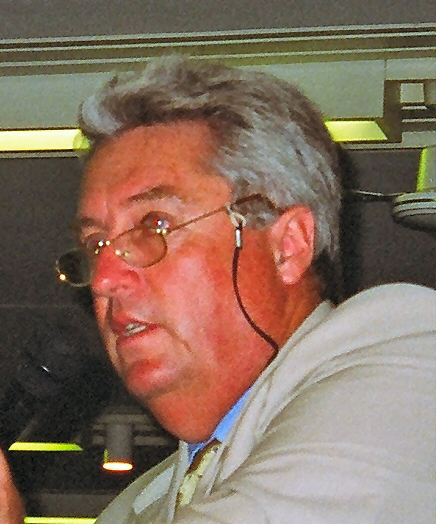
Bob Woolmer, coach of Warwickshire in 1994

In the 1993 season Warwickshire finished the County Championship in 16th position amongst the 18 counties. Two batsmen, Andy Moles and Dominic Ostler passed 1,000 runs while only Neil Smith, with 44, took more than 30 wickets. In one-day competitions they finished 10th in the National League, were knocked out of the first round of the Benson and Hedges Cup, and won the Natwest Trophy. They beat Sussex by five wickets in the Lord's final, chasing down 322 with Asif Din scoring a century and Dermot Reeve finishing unbeaten on 81.

The main pre-season interest surrounded which overseas player the county would sign. South African fast bowler Allan Donald had been at the club since 1987 but with South Africa touring England in 1994, the first time since re-admission, he would be unavailable for much of the season. The initial target was Indian all-rounder Manoj Prabhakar but he failed a fitness test on 6 April because of an ankle injury. The second choice was West Indian batsman Brian Lara and he signed a contract just two days later. Lara was playing in the Caribbean against England at the time and during the fifth Test of the series he scored 375, breaking the Test record for highest individual score.

The other significant signing in the close season was left arm spinner Richard Davis from Kent. Despite the acquisitions the club were not expected to mount a Championship challenge and were 25/1 to win the title. Warwickshire's coach for the season was Bob Woolmer who had joined the club in 1991 on a three-year contract. England all-rounder Dermot Reeve was captain for a second season.

== Squad ==
Name	Birth date	Batting Style	Bowling Style	Notes
Batsmen
Asif Din	21 September 1960 (aged 33)	Right-handed	Right arm leg spin	Warwickshire cap - 1987
**Brian Lara**	2 April 1969 (aged 25)	Left-handed	Right arm leg spin	Overseas player, Warwickshire cap - 1994
Andy Moles	12 February 1961 (aged 33)	Right-handed	Right arm medium pace	Warwickshire cap - 1987
Charles Mulraine	24 December 1973 (aged 20)	Left-handed	Slow left arm orthodox	
Dominic Ostler	15 July 1970 (aged 23)	Right-handed	Right arm medium pace	Warwickshire cap - 1991
Trevor Penney	12 June 1968 (aged 25)	Right-handed	Right arm medium pace, leg spin	Warwickshire cap - 1994
Mike Powell	5 April 1975 (aged 19)	Right-handed	Right arm medium pace	
Jason Ratcliffe	19 June 1969 (aged 24)	Right-handed	Right arm medium pace	
Roger Twose	17 April 1968 (aged 26)	Left-handed	Right arm medium pace	Warwickshire cap - 1992
Wasim Khan	26 February 1971 (aged 23)	Left-handed	Right arm leg spin	
All-rounders
Dougie Brown	29 October 1969 (aged 24)	Right-handed	Right arm fast-medium	
**Dermot Reeve**	2 April 1963 (aged 31)	Right-handed	Right arm medium pace	Club captain, Warwickshire cap - 1989
Neil Smith	27 July 1967 (aged 26)	Right-handed	Right arm off spin	Warwickshire cap - 1993
Paul Smith	19 April 1964 (aged 30)	Right-handed	Right arm fast-medium	Warwickshire cap - 1986
Graeme Welch	21 March 1972 (aged 22)	Right-handed	Right arm medium pace	
Wicket-keepers
Mike Burns	6 February 1969 (aged 25)	Right-handed	Right arm medium pace	
Tony Frost	17 November 1975 (aged 18)	Right-handed	—	
Keith Piper	18 December 1969 (aged 24)	Right-handed	—	Warwickshire cap - 1992
Bowlers
Darren Altree	30 September 1974 (aged 19)	Right-handed	Left arm fast-medium	
Michael Bell	19 December 1966 (aged 27)	Right-handed	Left arm medium-fast	
Richard Davis	29 December 1966 (aged 27)	Right-handed	Slow left arm orthodox	Warwickshire cap - 1994
Ashley Giles	19 March 1973 (aged 21)	Right-handed	Slow left arm orthodox	
Tim Munton	30 July 1965 (aged 28)	Right-handed	Right arm medium-fast	Warwickshire cap - 1989
**Gladstone Small**	18 October 1961 (aged 32)	Right-handed	Right arm fast-medium	Warwickshire cap - 1982

- Bold indicates an international player.
- The ages are correct for the start of the season (28 April 1994).

== County Championship ==
=== Results ===
28 April – 1 May
scorecard

Glamorgan	v	Warwickshire
365 (130.4 overs); David Hemp 127; Tim Munton 4/57 (23.4 overs)		657/7dec (176 overs); Roger Twose 277*; Brian Lara 147; Ottis Gibson 2/134 (30 overs)
189 (67.3 overs); Steve James 61; Gladstone Small 5/46 (17.3 overs)

Warwickshire won by an innings and 103 runs
Edgbaston, Birmingham
Umpires: John Hampshire and John Holder

- Points: Glamorgan 4, Warwickshire 22

Test record holder Brian Lara's county debut meant increased media presence for the first game of the season. The crowd was left disappointed on the first day as Glamorgan won the toss and chose to bat. The scoring rate on the first day was slow apart from Bermudian David Hemp who scored a maiden first-class century. In response to Glamorgan's 365 Warwickshire scored a total of 657/7 declared which equalled the county record for highest innings. The total was built on a career-best innings from opener Roger Twose, his score of 277 not out also was the second highest by a Warwickshire player. Twose had endured a poor 1993, scoring 224 runs in 11 matches, and surpassed that season's total in his dogged and determined innings which lasted more than ten hours. He shared a 215-run second wicket partnership with Lara, who scored 147 from 160 balls becoming the seventh Warwickshire player to score a hundred on debut. Needing to bat for longer than a day to draw the match Glamorgan lost two early wickets before the close of the third day. They were bowled out mid-afternoon on the final day with Gladstone Small claiming his first five wicket haul since 1990. Richard Davis, on his county debut, took three wickets.

5 – 9 May
scorecard

Leicestershire	v	Warwickshire
403 (123.2 overs); Nigel Briers 154; Gladstone Small 3/77 (27 overs)		254 (71.5 overs); Brian Lara 106; Adrian Pierson 8/42 (17.5 overs)
135/5dec (42 overs); Phil Simmons 39; Neil Smith 3/52 (17 overs)		206/7 (56.4 overs); Brian Lara 120*; David Millns 4/54 (15 overs)

Match drawn
Edgbaston, Birmingham
Umpires: Barry Dudleston and David Shepherd

- Points: Leicestershire 8, Warwickshire 5

Rain and bad light allowed only 14 balls to be delivered on the first day with Leicestershire, put in, remaining unscathed. On the second day opener and captain Nigel Briers scored his 27th century and first since his return from rupturing an Achilles tendon. He shared a partnership of 108 in 27 overs with Ben Smith (78). Leicestershire batted onto the third morning with Warwickshire's bowlers being too wayward to exploit the helpful conditions. Brian Lara continued his good form by scoring a third consecutive century but Warwickshire were only able to save the follow-on by one run. Roger Twose, with 51, was the only other player to pass 18 as the hosts collapsed from 201/2 to 254, all eight wickets falling to former Warwickshire spinner Adrian Pierson. On the final day Leicestershire batted on until 35 minutes after lunch before declaring to leave Warwickshire a target of 285 from 57 overs. They survived with three wickets remaining but owed a great deal to Lara who was the only person to pass 20, his score of 120 not out made him the first Warwickshire batsman in 10 years to score hundreds in both innings of a match.

19 – 23 May
scorecard

Somerset	v	Warwickshire
355/9dec (147.2 overs); Andy Hayhurst 111*; Paul Smith 3/24 (16 overs)		57/0dec (21 overs); Dominic Ostler 41*; Roger Twose 13*
22/0dec (3.1 overs); Graham Rose 13*; Mushtaq Ahmed 9*		322/4 (53.4 overs); Brian Lara 136; Mushtaq Ahmed 2/65 (14 overs)

Warwickshire won by five wickets
County Ground, Taunton
Umpires: Ray Julian and Kevin Lyons

- Points: Somerset 2, Warwickshire 18

After winning the toss and batting first Somerset closed the first day on 255/5, the highest scorer being opener Mark Lathwell who made 86 in nearly four hours. Following his dismissal captain Andy Hayhurst and wicket-keeper Robert Turner shared a fifth wicket stand of 100 which was ended shortly before the close. Hayhurst completed a slow-paced century on the second day, before afternoon showers led to the hosts’ declaration. The wickets were shared amongst the Warwickshire bowlers but Richard Davis did take five catches, one short of a county fielding record. Warwickshire closed on 57 without loss. The third day witnessed no play because of rain so to generate a result both teams declared early on the final day leaving Warwickshire a fourth innings target of 321 from 95 overs. They were well placed on 87/1 at lunch but rain returned to wash out the afternoon session leaving the visitors 33 overs to score the 234 more needed to win. Brian Lara set about the unlikely chase by sharing partnerships of 74 in 9 overs with Paul Smith and then 126 in 14 overs with Asif Din. Lara reached his century, his fifth in consecutive innings, off 72 balls and was dismissed for 136 off 94. Warwickshire completed the victory with 20 balls remaining.

26 – 30 May
scorecard

Warwickshire	v	Middlesex
211 (89 overs); Trevor Penney 43; Neil Williams 4/71 (24 overs)		249 (100 overs); Mike Roseberry 119; Gladstone Small 4/70 (28 overs)
306/5dec (75 overs); Brian Lara 140; Angus Fraser 2/60 (17 overs)		245/9 (50 overs); Mike Roseberry 73; Tim Munton 5/76 (17 overs)

Match drawn
Lord's Cricket Ground, St John's Wood
Umpires: Jack Bond and David Constant

- Points: Warwickshire 5, Middlesex 5

The pre-match interest surrounded Brian Lara and his attempt to equal the first-class record of scoring six centuries in consecutive innings. After rain wiped out the first day Lara soon found himself in the middle as Middlesex chose to field first and Warwickshire lost an early wicket. He made 26 before edging a leg side delivery from Richard Johnson through to the wicket-keeper. The visitors were all out for 211, with no batsman passing fifty. Desmond Haynes was dismissed off the first ball of the reply but Middlesex lost no further wickets in the remainder of the day. Mike Roseberry and Mike Gatting, not out overnight, shared 77 for the second wicket before the latter was dismissed for 52. Roseberry also shared 79 with Mark Ramprakash (37) before going on to complete a 17th first-class century. He was ninth out as the middle and lower order offered little resistance and Middlesex's lead was restricted to 38. The deficit was turned into a lead by the close with Lara scoring a 52-ball half-century. He completed a sixth century in seven innings on the final morning, adding 85 from 84 balls, that quick scoring enabled a declaration leaving Middlesex a target of 269 from 50 overs. They began well, reaching 129/1 before Tim Munton took the wickets of Gatting and Ramprakash in consecutive deliveries followed by Roseberry in his next over. The chase continued but another double strike from Munton left Middlesex to settle for the draw.

2 – 6 June
scorecard

Durham	v	Warwickshire
556/8dec (158.5 overs); John Morris 204; Gladstone Small 2/80 (22 overs)		810/4dec (135.5 overs); Brian Lara 501*; Keith Piper 116*; Anderson Cummins 2/158 (28 overs)

Match drawn
Edgbaston, Birmingham
Umpires: Trevor Jesty and Peter Wight

- Points: Durham 5, Warwickshire 6

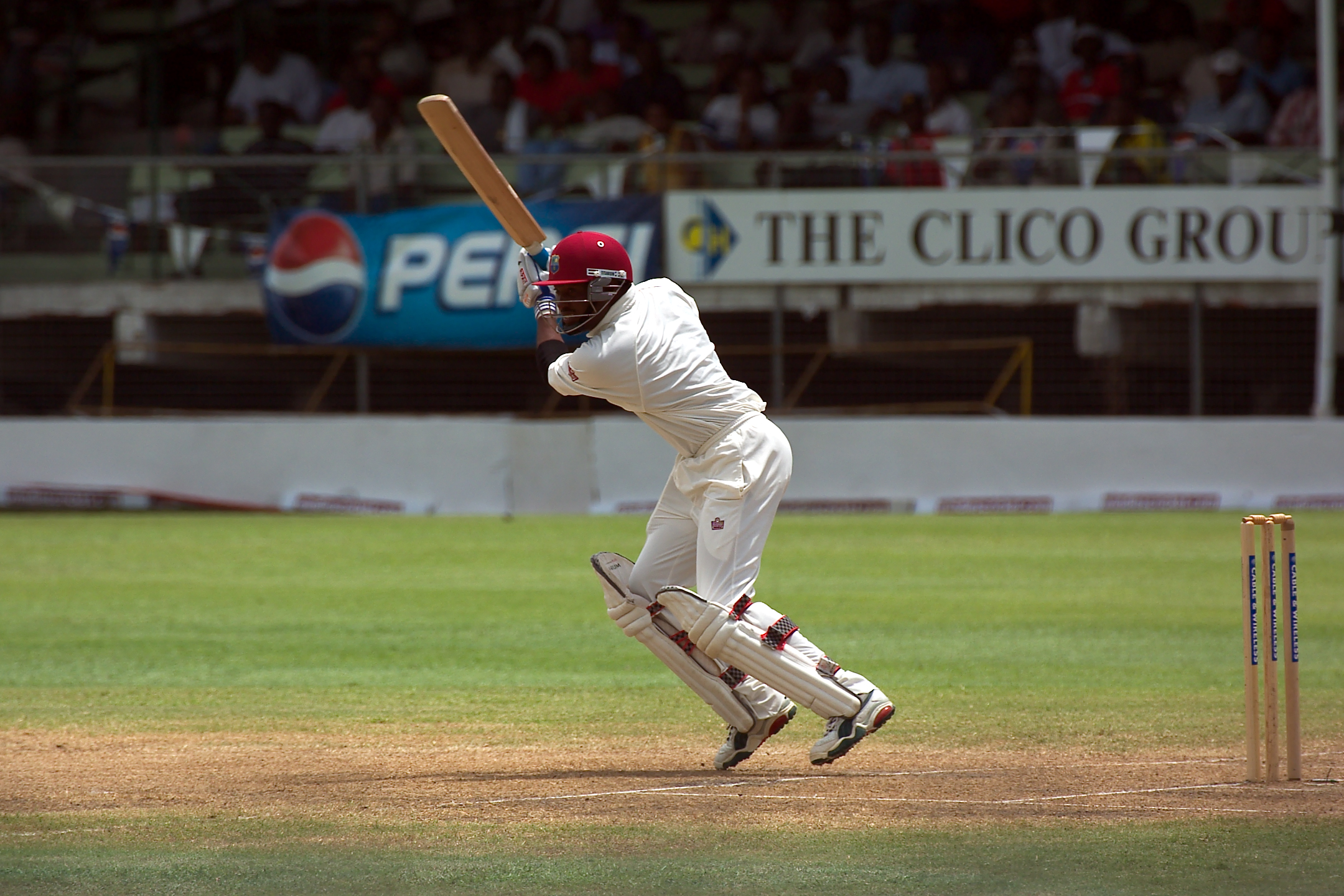
Brian Lara, scored 501 not out against Durham breaking the first-class record for highest score.

Durham won the toss and on an easy paced pitch chose to bat first. After both openers were dismissed inside the first 75 minutes, number three John Morris shared century partnerships with Stewart Hutton (61) and Phil Bainbridge (67). Morris was dismissed early on the second day but his innings of 204 was the highest by a Durham player at the time, it was also his first century for Durham since moving from Derbyshire. An eighth wicket stand of 134 between Anderson Cummins (62) and David Graveney (65*) boosted the total before a mid-afternoon declaration. The early wicket of Dominic Ostler brought Brian Lara to the crease, dropped on 18 by wicket-keeper Chris Scott at the close Lara was 111 not out and had become the first player to score seven centuries in eight innings. The third day of the match was rained off and with the captains unable to agree on a target, Lara had free rein to bat on. He took the opportunity by scoring 174 runs in the pre-lunch session, in the afternoon he added a further 133 and in the process beat the previous best by a Warwickshire player (305* by Frank Foster) and passed 1,000 runs for the season in only his seventh innings. After tea he passed Archie MacLaren's 424, the highest score in England, and progressed to 497 by the time of the final over. Still two runs short of the first-class record, Lara was made aware it was the last over of the match by batting partner Keith Piper after the fourth ball, the next delivery was driven for four to break the record. Lara's innings took 427 balls and lasted less than eight hours. He broke the records for most boundaries in an innings (72) and most runs in a single day (390). Trevor Penney contributed just 44 to a third wicket partnership of 314 with Lara while the unbeaten fifth wicket partnership between Lara and Piper was worth 322. The team total of 810/4 bettered the county record by over 150 runs.

16 – 20 June
scorecard

Warwickshire	v	Kent
417 (147.2 overs); Roger Twose 142; Mark Ealham 3/54 (20 overs)		359 (115.4 overs); Carl Hooper 136; Gladstone Small 3/40 (17 overs)
288/6dec (77 overs); Dominic Ostler 87; Carl Hooper 4/77 (20 overs)		270 (73.1 overs); Matthew Fleming 61; Neil Smith 7/133 (31 overs)

Warwickshire won by 76 runs
Edgbaston, Birmingham
Umpires: Chris Balderstone and David Shepherd

- Points: Warwickshire 23, Kent 6

Having won the toss and batted first, Warwickshire pair of Roger Twose and Dominic Ostler (94) put on 196, their largest opening partnership of the season. The stand delayed the appearance of Brian Lara, in his first Championship innings since his record-breaking innings he made a sketchy 19. Contributions down the order took the total past 400 by the time of their dismissal shortly after lunch on the second day. After the early loss of Mark Benson, Kent batted cautiously until Carl Hooper's arrival at 60/2. He batted fluently in reaching a century from 131 balls and shared 109 in 28 overs for the third wicket with David Ward (63). On the third day Richard Davis took a sharp return catch to dismiss Hooper and although Matthew Fleming struck an aggressive 73, Warwickshire were able to gain a first innings lead. The hosts openers put on a second century stand of the match, before 86 runs in 55 minutes on the fourth morning allowed a declaration. The target of 347 off 82 overs on a turning pitch proved too much as Kent's batsmen were unable to go on after making starts. Neil Smith's figures of 7/133 were a career best while fellow spinner Davis took the other three wickets.

23 – 27 June
scorecard

Warwickshire	v	Northamptonshire
463 (115.4 overs); Brian Lara 197; Paul Taylor 4/139 (32 overs)		267 (92.1 overs); Allan Lamb 81; Tim Munton 5/53 (25.1 overs)
230/6 (37.3 overs); Dominic Ostler 87; Nick Cook 3/51 (9.3 overs)		423 (175.4 overs); Mal Loye 113; Tim Munton 5/79 (41.4 overs)

Warwickshire won by four wickets
County Ground, Northampton
Umpires: Allan Jones and Barrie Leadbeater

- Points: Warwickshire 24, Northamptonshire 6

Warwickshire won the toss and built a formidable first day total of 448/9 after Brian Lara scored an eighth century in eleven innings. His score of 197 took 195 balls and contained 30 fours and 3 sixes. The only bowler to contain Lara was Curtly Ambrose who conceded 12 runs from the 45 balls he delivered to him. The second highest score was 39 from Trevor Penney who put on 168 in 31 overs with Lara. The last wicket partnership between Graeme Welch and Tim Munton grew to 68 before the innings was ended. Early in the reply Munton took the wickets of both openers before a 137 run partnership between Allan Lamb and Rob Bailey (54) recovered the situation. Welch, on his Championship debut, took the wickets of Lamb, Bailey and Mal Loye in a 22 ball spell and Northamptonshire lost their last 5 wickets for 27 runs allowing Warwickshire to enforce the follow on. Northamptonshire fared better second time around despite losing their first four wickets by the time the score reached 83. Loye and Kevin Curran (56) repaired the innings so the hosts ended day three with a lead of 84 runs and three wickets remaining. Loye, 99 overnight, reached his century before his seven-hour innings was ended. The resistance was continued by Russell Warren (94) and tail-ender Paul Taylor who took 113 balls for his 26. Needing 228 in 38 overs, Warwickshire won with three balls to spare. Dominic Ostler and Roger Twose (39) shared a fourth consecutive century opening stand while Penney, promoted to number three, added 43.

30 June – 4 July
scorecard

Lancashire	v	Warwickshire
392 (114.5 overs); John Crawley 141; Graeme Welch 3/72 (15 overs)		407 (129.4 overs); Trevor Penney 111; Glen Chapple 4/52 (22 overs)
194 (66 overs); John Crawley 54; Neil Smith 7/42 (20 overs)		183/4 (50.2 overs); Roger Twose 90; Mike Watkinson 2/58 (19.2 overs)

Warwickshire won by six wickets
Edgbaston, Birmingham
Umpires: Vanburn Holder and Mervyn Kitchen

- Points: Lancashire 6, Warwickshire 24

Lancashire won the toss and chose to bat first. After losing both openers cheaply, John Crawley and Neil Fairbrother (76) put together a third wicket partnership of 164. Crawley's innings took him past 1,000 runs for the season, the third man to pass the landmark in 1994. Lancashire collapsed from a strong position of 274/3 to 342/9 with Welch taking three wickets in 19 balls. Despite missing Brian Lara the match with a knee injury, Warwickshire's top order performed well ending day two on 350/3. Opener Andy Moles scored 87 from 222 balls while Trevor Penney reached a sixth first-class hundred. Jason Radcliffe, making his first appearance of the season, added 69. The hosts collapsed on the third morning losing their last seven wickets for 28 runs, four of those fell to Glen Chapple. The clay pitch was now offering indifferent bounce and after making a good start to their second innings Lancashire themselves collapsed from 100/1 to 194 all out. Neil Smith took 7/42 and bettered his career best figures for the second successive home match. With rain threatening, the target was chased urgently, the last 72 runs being scored in 12 overs. Roger Twose's top score of 90 contained eleven fours and two sixes.

14 – 18 July
scorecard

Warwickshire	v	Surrey
246 (67.2 overs); Graeme Welch 59; Cameron Cuffy 3/74 (17 overs)		143 (49.5 overs); Alec Stewart 56; Roger Twose 6/28 (13 overs)
399/9dec (141.2 overs); Andy Moles 203*; Joey Benjamin 3/70 (32 overs)		246 (87.4 overs); Andrew Smith 45; Tim Munton 5/96 (28 overs)

Warwickshire won by 256 runs
Woodbridge Road, Guildford
Umpires: Ken Palmer and Nigel Plews

- Points: Warwickshire 21, Surrey 4

Surrey chose to bowl first on a green pitch and made use of the conditions to reduce Warwickshire to 52/5. Paul Smith suffered injuries to his hand and elbow but batted on to score 34 in two hours while Graeme Welch and Dougie Brown (54) both scored maiden first-class fifties putting on 110 for the ninth wicket. Alec Stewart and Graham Thorpe (38) added 107 for the second wicket before losing five wickets to the medium pace of Roger Twose in a nine over spell on the first evening. The last four wickets fell inside half an hour on the second morning, Tim Munton took three of those while Twose took the other to finish with career best figures. Opener Andy Moles scored his first century of the season and with contributions from Brian Lara (44) and Twose (31), Warwickshire built a substantial lead by the end of the second day. The best support came from Neil Smith who scored 57 and added 131 with Moles for the sixth wicket. Moles remained unbeaten, his innings breaking the record for the highest at the ground. By the close of the third day Surrey had lost five wickets. The lower order scored quickly on the final morning but could not prevent a heavy defeat. Munton and Neil Smith bowled throughout the final session, Munton took 5/96 to end with match figures of 9/137 and Smith took four wickets.

21 – 23 July
scorecard

Warwickshire	v	Essex
361 (100.2 overs); Brian Lara 70; Ronnie Irani 3/77 (24 overs)		215 (68 overs); Nick Knight 56; Tim Munton 6/89 (23 overs)
268 (78 overs); Roger Twose 92; John Childs 4/63 (19 overs)		211 (83 overs); Nick Knight 113; Dougie Brown 4/25 (9 overs)

Warwickshire won by 203 runs
Edgbaston, Birmingham
Umpires: Allan Jones and George Sharp

- Points: Warwickshire 24, Essex 5

Winning the toss, Warwickshire batted aggressively in their first innings. Brian Lara top scored with 70 from 81 balls, which included 11 fours and a six; there were also fifties from Andy Moles and Neil Smith. In the field Nick Knight took five catches, equalling the county record, and affected a run out. Before the close Essex had lost two wickets to Graeme Welch. Essex batted unconvincingly and only saved the follow-on by four runs. Knight scored his first championship half-century for two years and Nasser Hussain added 53 but both were caught by Keith Piper who took seven catches in the innings, a county record. Tim Munton took the last six wickets to fall, five in a twelve over spell after lunch. Moles and Roger Twose shared a century opening stand and Warwickshire closed the second day on 156/3, a lead of 302. Twose was dismissed early on the third day and the last seven wickets added 106 to increase the lead past 400. Opener Knight was the mainstay of Essex's second innings, he scored more than half the total and was last man out for 113. The second highest score was 26 from Jonathan Lewis who added 79 with Knight for the second wicket. Munton dismissed Lewis and Hussain before Dougie Brown was introduced and took four quick wickets, Munton returned to take Knight, his tenth wicket of the match.

28 – 30 July
scorecard

Warwickshire	v	Derbyshire
280 (57.5 overs); Brian Lara 142; Simon Base 5/92 (17.5 overs)		198 (68.2 overs); Dominic Cork 46; Tim Munton 7/52 (25.2 overs)
259 (70.3 overs); Dominic Ostler 68; Kim Barnett 5/31 (12.3 overs)		202 (74 overs); Chris Adams 41; Neil Smith 5/69 (28 overs)

Warwickshire won by 139 runs
Queen's Park, Chesterfield
Umpires: Barry Dudleston and Peter Willey

- Points: Warwickshire 22, Derbyshire 4

Derbyshire won the toss and on a green pitch bowled first. Brian Lara struck his eighth century of the season including a hundred, off 94 balls, before lunch. He put on 160 for the fourth wicket with Trevor Penney (41) who was the only other batsman to pass 17. Tim Munton took three wickets as Derbyshire closed day one on 165/6. On the second morning Munton took the remaining four wickets in 23 balls to finish with 7/52, his seventh five wicket haul and best figures of the season. Dominic Ostler and Andy Moles (63) added 114 in 29 overs for the third wicket after the fall of Lara for 51 off 45. Derbyshire captain Kim Barnett took the wicket of Moles which sparked a collapse from 190/2, his leg-spin took five wickets while off-spinner Matthew Vandrau claimed three. The second day closed with Derbyshire on 26/1 in pursuit of 342. Munton took two wickets in his opening spell to reduce the hosts to 35/4, from there wickets fell regularly with off-spinner Neil Smith taking 5/69. Wicket-keeper Keith Piper took seven dismissals in the innings, equalling the Warwickshire record for the second match running. He also took 11 dismissals in the match which broke the county record and was one short of the first-class record.

4 – 8 August
scorecard

Warwickshire	v	Worcestershire
216 (91.5 overs); Andy Moles 39; Roger Twose 39; Stuart Lampitt 4/32 (21.5 overs)		473/4dec (156 overs); Tim Curtis 180; Neil Smith 4/141 (41 overs)
346/5 (105 overs); Trevor Penney 84*; Phil Newport 2/71 (21 overs)

Match drawn
New Road, Worcester
Umpires: John Harris and Alan Whitehead

- Points: Warwickshire 1, Worcestershire 6

Worcestershire chose to bowl first on a gloomy first day which saw 62 overs lost to the weather. Warwickshire lost three wickets on the opening day, openers Andy Moles and Roger Twose both scored 39 with Brian Lara making five. On the second day Warwickshire lost their last seven wickets for 87 in 44 overs, Stuart Lampitt was the pick of the bowlers taking three wickets to finish with figures of 4/32. Worcestershire openers Philip Weston and Tim Curtis had both scored unbeaten half-centuries before the close. The pair had shared 208 for the opening partnership when Weston fell six short of a first century of the season, Curtis went on to score 180 in over eight hours of batting. In the post-tea session David Leatherdale (71*) and Lampitt (56*) capitalised on poor bowling to boost the total by 133 in 25 overs. A declaration left Warwickshire with a deficit of 257 and 116 overs to play, in a 14 over spell on the third evening they lost two wickets. Nightwatchman Graeme Welch (66) and Moles (67) put on 135 for the third wicket and with further half-centuries from Trevor Penney and Lara (57) Warwickshire comfortably survived the final day to draw the match.

11 – 15 August
scorecard

Nottinghamshire	v	Warwickshire
597/8dec (166 overs); Chris Lewis 220*; Paul Pollard 134; Tim Munton 2/80 (39 overs)		321 (89 overs); Graeme Welch 84*; Kevin Evans 4/71 (23 overs)
		233 (86.1 overs); Roger Twose 80; Chris Lewis 4/86 (26.1 overs)

Nottinghamshire won by an innings and 43 runs
Edgbaston, Birmingham
Umpires: Vanburn Holder and Barrie Leadbeater

- Points: Nottinghamshire 24, Warwickshire 5

Warwickshire won the toss and fielded first on an overcast day and slow pitch. Stand-in captain Tim Munton took an early wicket but Nottinghamshire dominated the first day with Paul Pollard scoring a century in 295 minutes. He shared hundred partnerships with both Graeme Archer (41) and Paul Johnson (63) as the visitors closed a curtailed opening day on 268/4. Chris Lewis dominated the scoring on day two, taking his overnight score of 20 to 220 not out by the time of the declaration. He scored 21 fours and 6 sixes in his innings, and added 157 in 27 overs with Kevin Evans. Warwickshire lost three wickets in the remaining 20 over session. Warwickshire were made to follow on despite lower order resistance from Graeme Welch. He scored a career best 84 not out sharing in an eighth wicket stand of 68 with Neil Smith and added 86 with tail-enders Gladstone Small and Munton. Following on, Brian Lara was dismissed for a duck which brought his season average below 100 for the first time. The hosts closed day three on 134/3 with Roger Twose unbeaten on 74. Twose and overnight partner, Trevor Penney, were both dismissed inside the first 10 overs of the final day to reduce hopes of drawing the match. Three other wickets fell before lunch and Nottinghamshire's victory was achieved 45 minutes after the interval when Munton fell to Lewis, his sixth of the match.

18 – 22 August
scorecard

Yorkshire	v	Warwickshire
310 (104.5 overs); Bradley Parker 62; Graeme Welch 4/74 (21 overs)		459 (151.4 overs); Dominic Ostler 186; Richard Stemp 4/107 (46 overs)
347 (113.1 overs); Martyn Moxon 116; Richard Davis 6/94 (40 overs)		200/4 (40.3 overs); Roger Twose 86*; Jeremy Batty 2/57 (12 overs)

Warwickshire won by eight wickets
North Marine Road Ground, Scarborough
Umpires: Dickie Bird and Graham Burgess

- Points: Yorkshire 5, Warwickshire 24

Yorkshire won the toss and batted first on a slow but flat pitch. They had lost five wickets for 175 by mid afternoon but a sixth wicket stand of 94 between Bradley Parker and Peter Hartley (61) boosted the total. Parker's innings was a career best and contained eight fours. Debutant Alex Wharf claimed Brian Lara as his maiden wicket in first-class cricket, to leave Warwickshire on 44/2. Opener Andy Moles (65) and Dominic Ostler put on 191 in 67 overs for the third wicket, building the platform for a significant first innings lead. Twose innings included 21 fours and a six and fell six runs short of a career best score. The visitors closed day two with a lead of 36 and five wickets remaining. Welch scored a third fifty in consecutive matches and aided by contributions from the lower order the lead was increased to 149. Yorkshire began well in response, openers Martyn Moxon and Michael Vaughan (49) put on 93 before the latter was bowled by Richard Davis. Davis took two further wickets in quick succession to reduce them to 109/3. Moxton reached a third century of the season and alongside Richard Blakey put on 92 before play ended. Moxton added 10 to his overnight score but a fluent 77 from Blakey and a spirited 46 by Wharf saw the innings well into the final afternoon. Davis took three further wickets, finishing with his first five wicket haul for the club. The target for Warwickshire was 199 in 49 overs and an opening stand of 89 in 16 overs between Moles (48) and Twose ensured it was a comfortable chase, achieved with eight and a half overs in hand.

25 – 27 August
scorecard

Sussex	v	Warwickshire
131 (54.2 overs); Jamie Hall 42; Tim Munton 4/22 (15.2 overs)		183 (53.2 overs); Dominic Ostler 50; Paul Jarvis 4/68 (18 overs)
127 (53.4 overs); Martin Speight 38; Tim Munton 4/52 (20.4 overs)		79/0 (19.4 overs); Andy Moles 44*; Roger Twose 34*

Warwickshire won by ten wickets
County Ground, Hove
Umpires: Nigel Plews and Bob White

- Points: Sussex 4, Warwickshire 20

After rain delayed the start until 2.30pm, Sussex won the toss and batted first. They made a solid start, reaching 59/1 after 90 minutes of play before Roger Twose in his fourth over took three wickets. Jamie Hall and Peter Moores (29) steadied the innings with a partnership of 42 but the wicket of Hall caused a collapse from 103/4 to 131 all out. Warwickshire lost two wickets in the remaining three overs. With the visitors on 67/5 the match was evenly poised but Dominic Ostler and Trevor Penney (24) put on 67 for the sixth wicket, Ostler was the only player to score a half-century in the match. A ninth wicket stand of 30 between Graeme Welch and Gladstone Small increased the lead past 50, substantial under the circumstances. Sussex lost regular wickets in their second innings and closed day two on 107/8 with top scoring Martin Speight unbeaten on 38. Tim Munton dismissed Speight with the second ball of the third day and shortly afterwards took the final wicket to finish with eight wickets in the match. Requiring 76 to win, openers Andy Moles and Twose saw Warwickshire to victory without loss.

30 August – 2 September
scorecard

Hampshire	v	Warwickshire
278 (108.2 overs); Paul Terry 71; Tim Munton 4/44 (23 overs)		536 (119 overs); Brian Lara 191; Roger Twose 137; Cardigan Connor 4/124 (31 overs)
163 (50.2 overs); Mark Nicholas 36*; Neil Smith 5/65 (19.2 overs)

Warwickshire won by an innings and 95 runs
Edgbaston, Birmingham
Umpires: Kevin Lyons and Roy Palmer

- Points: Hampshire 6, Warwickshire 24

Hampshire chose to bat first on winning the toss; they began slowly before a collapse of five wickets for ten runs in eight overs. The position of 129/1 had been built by Paul Terry who scored 71 and shared stands of 74 and 55 with Tony Middleton (18) and Giles White (30) respectively. They recovered from 139/6 with Shaun Udal adding 64 and Rajesh Maru scoring 32. By the close Hampshire had been dismissed, Tim Munton finishing the innings with his fourth wicket of the day and 500th of his career. Warwickshire dominated a curtailed second day, scoring 210 in three hours of play. Andy Moles was the sole wicket to fall, and that brought together left-handers Roger Twose and Brian Lara who shared an unbeaten second wicket stand of 156 in 28 overs. When play was abandoned Lara had scored 89 from 93 balls and Twose 84 from 121. The partnership was extended to 295, the highest for any Warwickshire wicket against Hampshire. Lara's score was his ninth century for the club and took him past 2,000 runs for the season. Twose's innings of 137 took five hours and contained 19 boundaries. After their dismissals the middle order looked to score quickly but rain again restricted play. Warwickshire closed with a lead of 205 and four wickets remaining. They batted on for 40 minutes into the final morning increasing the lead by 53 runs. Munton dismissed both openers before spinners Neil Smith and Richard Davis took over, taking the remaining eight wickets including a spell of five wickets in five overs. The innings victory secured the County Championship title for Warwickshire, their first since 1972.

15 – 19 September
scorecard

Gloucestershire	v	Warwickshire
372/9dec (111.5 overs); Dean Hodgson 113; Richard Davis 6/128 (41.5 overs)		24/0 (6.4 overs); Roger Twose 12*; Andy Moles 7*

Match drawn
County Ground, Bristol
Umpires: Kevin Lyons and Peter Wight

- Points: Gloucestershire 4, Warwickshire 4

The fixture was drawn with only one day, the third, of play possible. Gloucestershire won the toss and chose to bat first, Dean Hodgson scored a century having endured a poor season. He added 110 for the second wicket with Matt Windows (63) and there were contributions down the order from Tim Hancock (70) and Martyn Ball (38). Richard Davis bowled a long spell to take his second six wicket haul in four matches. The declaration came 40 minutes before the close and Warwickshire remained unscathed.

=== Table ===
Pos	Club	Pld	W	D	L	Bat	Bowl	Pts
1	Warwickshire	17	11	5	1	41	55	272
2	Leicestershire	17	8	2	7	42	60	230
3	Nottinghamshire	17	8	4	5	39	51	218

=== Averages ===
		Batting				Bowling				Fielding
Player	Matches	Runs	Average	High Score	100 / 50	Overs	Wickets	Average	Best	Catches
Asif Din	3	107	35.66	42*	0/0	2	0	–	–	1
Michael Bell	1	4	–	4*	0/0	31	3	36.00	3/89	1
Dougie Brown	3	113	28.25	54	0/1	35	5	23.60	4/25	0
Richard Davis	11	131	18.71	35*	0/0	337	31	31.74	6/94	15
Brian Lara	15	2,066	89.82	501*	9/3	21	0	–	–	11
Andy Moles	11	863	50.76	203*	1/5	–	–	–	–	5
Tim Munton	17	106	10.60	36	0/0	693.4	81	21.54	7/52	4
Dominic Ostler	17	1,012	38.92	186	1/6	1.1	0	–	–	14
Trevor Penney	15	774	38.70	111	1/5	–	–	–	–	14
Keith Piper	17	454	22.70	116*	1/1	–	–	–	–	61
Jason Ratcliffe	2	80	20.00	69	0/1	–	–	–	–	1
Dermot Reeve	8	109	13.62	33	0/0	138	8	37.37	2/31	18
Gladstone Small	11	78	8.66	23	0/0	339	36	26.27	5/46	2
Neil Smith	17	435	25.58	65	0/2	581	49	34.48	7/42	3
Paul Smith	11	313	22.35	65	0/1	182	18	33.00	3/24	2
Roger Twose	17	1,395	55.80	277*	3/6	185.5	15	35.66	6/28	8
Graeme Welch	11	446	37.16	84*	0/4	263	22	43.13	4/74	5

== Sunday League ==
=== Results ===
8 May
scorecard

Warwickshire; 173/4 (40 overs)	v	Leicestershire; 151 (39.3 overs)
Dermot Reeve 65*; Gordon Parsons 3/31 (8 overs)		James Whitaker 33; Michael Bell 5/19 (8 overs)

Warwickshire won by 22 runs
Edgbaston, Birmingham
Umpires: Barry Dudleston and David Shepherd

22 May
scorecard

Somerset; 105/7 (20 overs)	v	Warwickshire; 106/5 (19.2 overs)
Mark Lathwell 31; Paul Smith 3/18 (4 overs)		Paul Smith 41; Graham Rose 2/12 (4 overs)

Warwickshire won by five wickets
County Ground, Taunton
Umpires: Ray Julian and Kevin Lyons

- Rain reduced match to 20 overs

29 May
scorecard

Middlesex; 155/7 (38 overs)	v	Warwickshire; 156/3 (37 overs)
Desmond Haynes 31; Paul Smith 2/18 (8 overs)		Paul Smith 44; Mark Feltham 2/41 (7 overs)

Warwickshire won by three wickets
Lord's Cricket Ground, St John's Wood
Umpires: Jack Bond and David Constant

- Rain reduced match to 38 overs

5 June
scorecard

Warwickshire; 236/8 (40 overs)	v	Durham; 152 (39.2 overs)
Dominic Ostler 83; Anderson Cummins 3/40 (8 overs)		Mark Saxelby 39; Neil Smith 3/27 (8 overs)

Warwickshire won by 84 runs
Edgbaston, Birmingham
Umpires: Trevor Jesty and Peter Wight

19 June
scorecard

Kent; 210/7 (40 overs)	v	Warwickshire; 211/4 (38.1 overs)
Trevor Ward 63; Neil Smith 3/34 (8 overs)		Asif Din 86*; Dean Headley 1/33 (8 overs)

Warwickshire won by six wickets
Edgbaston, Birmingham
Umpires: Chris Balderstone and David Shepherd

26 June
scorecard

Warwickshire; 218/6 (40 overs)	v	Northamptonshire; 104 (33.2 overs)
Dominic Ostler 78; Kevin Curran 2/36 (8 overs)		Rob Bailey 44; Neil Smith 4/19 (8 overs)

Warwickshire won by 114 runs
County Ground, Northampton
Umpires: Allan Jones and Barrie Leadbeater

3 July
scorecard

Lancashire; 204/7 (40 overs)	v	Warwickshire; 111 (29.4 overs)
Neil Fairbrother 70; Tim Munton 3/57 (8 overs)		Trevor Penney 26; Gary Yates 4/34 (7.4 overs)

Lancashire won by 93 runs
Edgbaston, Birmingham
Umpires: Vanburn Holder and Mervyn Kitchen

12 July
scorecard

Glamorgan; 155 (38.3 overs)	v	Warwickshire; 156/6 (38.3 overs)
Hugh Morris 42; Paul Smith 5/38 (8 overs)		Dermot Reeve 52*; Roland Lefebvre 3/28 (8 overs)

Warwickshire won by four wickets
Edgbaston, Birmingham
Umpires: John Hampshire and Roy Palmer

17 July
scorecard

Warwickshire; 249/7 (40 overs)	v	Surrey; 236/8 (40 overs)
Roger Twose 96*; Tony Pigott 2/38 (8 overs)		Ali Brown 69; Graeme Welch 1/25 (3 overs)

Warwickshire won by 13 runs
Woodbridge Road, Guildford
Umpires: Ken Palmer and Nigel Plews

24 July
scorecard

Essex; 147 (35.4 overs)	v	Warwickshire; 148/7 (34.2 overs)
Nick Knight 40; Neil Smith 3/28 (7.4 overs)		Paul Smith 45; Darren Cousins 3/18 (6 overs)

Warwickshire won by three wickets
Edgbaston, Birmingham
Umpires: Allan Jones and George Sharp

31 July
scorecard

Warwickshire; 239/8 (36 overs)	v	Derbyshire
Roger Twose 74; Dominic Cork 4/44 (7 overs)

No result
Queen's Park, Chesterfield
Umpires: Barry Dudleston and Peter Willey

- Rain initially reduced match to 36 overs before further rain washed it out altogether

7 August
scorecard

Worcestershire; 182/8 (38 overs)	v	Warwickshire; 179/8 (38 overs)
Gavin Haynes 76; Roger Twose 3/36 (5 overs)		Neil Smith 47; Neal Radford 4/36 (8 overs)

Worcestershire won by three runs
Edgbaston, Birmingham
Umpires: John Harris and Alan Whitehead

- Rain reduced match to 38 overs

14 August
scorecard

Warwickshire; 294/6 (40 overs)	v	Nottinghamshire; 222/9 (40 overs)
Brian Lara 75; Jimmy Adams 1/35 (8 overs)		Tim Robinson 76; Neil Smith 3/47 (8 overs)

Warwickshire won by 72 runs
Edgbaston, Birmingham
Umpires: Vanburn Holder and Barrie Leadbeater

21 August
scorecard

Yorkshire; 209/3 (40 overs)	v	Warwickshire; 155 (33.1 overs)
Richard Blakey 55*; Graeme Welch 1/24 (8 overs)		Dermot Reeve 41; Alex Wharf 3/39 (8 overs)

Yorkshire won by 54 runs
North Marine Road Ground, Scarborough
Umpires: Dickie Bird and Graham Burgess

28 August
scorecard

Sussex; 157/7 (39 overs)	v	Warwickshire; 161/5 (35 overs)
Alan Wells 60; Dermot Reeve 2/16 (8 overs)		Dominic Ostler 84*; Bill Athey 2/27 (5 overs)

Warwickshire won by five wickets
County Ground, Hove
Umpires: Nigel Plews and Bob White

- Rain reduced match to 39 overs

6 September
scorecard

Hampshire; 197/4 (40 overs)	v	Warwickshire; 147/4 (28 overs)
Robin Smith 68; Richard Davis 2/29 (8 overs)		Brian Lara 56; Kevan James 2/20 (4 overs)

Warwickshire won on faster scoring rate
Edgbaston, Birmingham
Umpires: Dickie Bird and John Harris

- Rain curtailed the match, Warwickshire needed 138 after 28 overs

18 September
scorecard

Warwickshire; 183/8 (39 overs)	v	Gloucestershire; 137 (37 overs)
Trevor Penney 55; Courtney Walsh 3/24 (7 overs)		Matt Windows 47; Gladstone Small 3/25 (8 overs)

Warwickshire won by 46 runs
County Ground, Bristol
Umpires: Kevin Lyons and Peter Wight

- Rain reduced match to 39 overs

=== Table ===
Pos	Club	Pld	W	L	NR	Pts
1	Warwickshire	17	13	3	1	54
2	Worcestershire	17	12	4	1	50
3	Kent	17	12	5	0	48

=== Averages ===
		Batting				Bowling					Fielding
Player	Matches	Runs	Average	High Score	100 / 50	Overs	Wickets	Average	Econ	Best	Catches
Asif Din	12	265	29.44	86*	0/2	3	0	–	7.33	–	2
Michael Bell	1	0	–	–	–	8	5	3.80	2.37	5/19	0
Dougie Brown	1	1	1.00	1	0/0	–	–	–	–	–	0
Mike Burns	7	68	11.33	37	0/0	–	–	–	–	–	11
Richard Davis	7	12	6.00	5	0/0	42.2	10	17.50	4.13	3/19	3
Brian Lara	14	364	26.00	75	0/3	–	–	–	–	–	6
Andy Moles	2	51	25.50	31	0/0	–	–	–	–	–	2
Tim Munton	17	16	–	15*	0/0	117	16	31.31	4.28	3/57	4
Dominic Ostler	17	530	33.12	84*	0/5	–	–	–	–	–	4
Trevor Penney	15	229	57.25	55	0/1	–	–	–	–	–	4
Keith Piper	10	31	10.33	13*	0/0	–	–	–	–	–	11
Dermot Reeve	16	378	31.50	65*	0/3	91.3	10	32.80	3.58	2/16	2
Gladstone Small	14	15	15.00	7*	0/0	86.2	14	28.35	4.59	3/25	2
Neil Smith	17	211	17.58	56	0/2	103.1	26	15.84	3.99	4/19	6
Paul Smith	14	252	18.00	45	0/0	74.2	20	18.80	5.05	5/38	4
Roger Twose	17	397	30.53	96*	0/2	35.4	7	28.42	5.57	3/36	7
Graeme Welch	6	57	14.25	26	0/0	37	7	23.28	4.40	2/30	3

== Natwest Trophy ==
=== Results ===
21 – 22 June
scorecard

Warwickshire; 361/8 (60 overs)	v	Bedfordshire; 164 (56.3 overs)
Roger Twose 110; Chris Bullen 3/58 (10 overs)		Jonathan Robinson 67; Paul Smith 2/13 (8 overs)

Warwickshire won by 197 runs
Edgbaston, Birmingham
Umpires: John Holder and Peter Wight
Player of the match: Roger Twose

- Rain forced the match into a second day

6 – 7 July
scorecard

Warwickshire; 296/6 (60 overs)	v	Leicestershire; 168 (47.3 overs)
Trevor Penney 65; David Millns 2/35 (12 overs); Alan Mullally 2/35 (12 overs)		Tim Boon 55; Neil Smith 3/28 (11.3 overs)

Warwickshire won by 128 runs
Grace Road, Leicester
Umpires: Graham Burgess and Bob White
Player of the match: Trevor Penney

- Rain forced the match into a second day

26 July
scorecard

Somerset; 124 (50.2 overs)	v	Warwickshire; 125/2 (24.1 overs)
Andy Hayhurst 29*; Neil Smith 4/26 (8.2 overs)		Dominic Ostler 47; Harvey Trump 1/41 (6.1 overs)

Warwickshire won by eight wickets
County Ground, Taunton
Umpires: Vanburn Holder and Barrie Leadbeater
Player of the match: Neil Smith

9 August
scorecard

Warwickshire; 265/8 (60 overs)	v	Kent; 257 (59.5 overs)
Andy Moles 105*; Matthew Fleming 3/28 (6 overs)		Trevor Ward 80; Dermot Reeve 3/44 (11 overs)

Warwickshire won by eight runs
Edgbaston, Birmingham
Umpires: John Hampshire and Barrie Meyer
Player of the match: Andy Moles

3 – 4 September
scorecard

Warwickshire; 223/9 (60 overs)	v	Worcestershire; 227/2 (49.1 overs)
Brian Lara 81; Phil Newport 4/38 (12 overs)		Graeme Hick 93*; Tim Munton 1/23 (12 overs)

Worcestershire won by eight wickets
Lord's Cricket Ground, St John's Wood
Umpires: Nigel Plews and David Shepherd
Player of the match: Tom Moody

- Rain forced the match into a second day

== Benson & Hedges Cup ==
=== Results ===
10 May
scorecard

Middlesex; 150 (54.3 overs)	v	Warwickshire; 151/7 (53.2 overs)
Mark Ramprakash 42; Tim Munton 3/27 (11 overs)		Trevor Penney 39; Paul Weekes 3/32 (10 overs)

Warwickshire won by three wickets
Lord's Cricket Ground, St John's Wood
Umpires: John Harris and Trevor Jesty
Player of the match: Tim Munton

24 – 25 May
scorecard

Warwickshire	v	Kent

Warwickshire won by bowl-out
Edgbaston, Birmingham

- No play possible on either day so match decided by a bowl-out which Warwickshire won 5-4.

7 June
scorecard

Surrey; 267/7 (55 overs)	v	Warwickshire; 270/6 (54.1 overs)
Graham Thorpe 87; Dermot Reeve 3/48 (11 overs)		Brian Lara 70; Tony Pigott 3/43 (11 overs)

Warwickshire won by four wickets
The Oval, Kennington
Umpires: David Constant and Barry Dudleston
Player of the match: Dermot Reeve

9 July
scorecard

Worcestershire; 170/9 (55 overs)	v	Warwickshire; 172/4 (44.2 overs)
Tom Moody 47; Paul Smith 3/34 (11 overs)		Dominic Ostler 55; Phil Newport 1/29 (8 overs)

Warwickshire won by six wickets
Lord's Cricket Ground, St John's Wood
Umpires: Dickie Bird and Ken Palmer
Player of the match: Paul Smith

== Aftermath ==
Despite Warwickshire's success, none of the players were selected for the 1994–95 Ashes series while just one, Keith Piper, was selected for the England A team's tour of India. Captain Dermot Reeve described this as "extremely disappointing" mentioning the names of Tim Munton, Roger Twose, Dominic Ostler and Neil Smith as surprising omissions. Coach Bob Woolmer said it was "unbelievable" and also picked out Twose, Ostler and Smith as deserving of a place in the A team at least. Journalist Alan Lee selected a possible 15 man squad before the announcement and chose Twose, Munton, Ostler and Piper.

For their performances in 1994 Brian Lara and Tim Munton were both named amongst the five Wisden Cricketers of the Year in the 1995 Wisden. Pat Murphy wrote of the Championship celebrations:

The biggest cheer, one laced with affection and respect, went to Tim Munton. That was not just for an outstanding personal season, nor for his golden run as stand-in captain for the injured Dermot Reeve, but also for Munton's high standards of professionalism, his durability and his approachability. The supporters had not forgotten Munton selfless performances in many undistinguished seasons for the club, his tireless commitment to his job, his willingness to meet every autograph request and to exchange cheery banter at any time of his working day.

Following the end of the season Bob Woolmer left the club to coach South Africa, his successor was Phil Neale who alongside captain Dermot Reeve led Warwickshire to another successful season. They won two trophies, retaining the County Championship and winning the Natwest Trophy and narrowly missed a third by finishing second to Kent in the Sunday League, losing out on run rate. Allan Donald returned as overseas player and took 88 Championship wickets at 15.48. The major close season signing was Essex opener Nick Knight.
