= Birmingham Walk of Stars =

Walk of fame in Birmingham, England

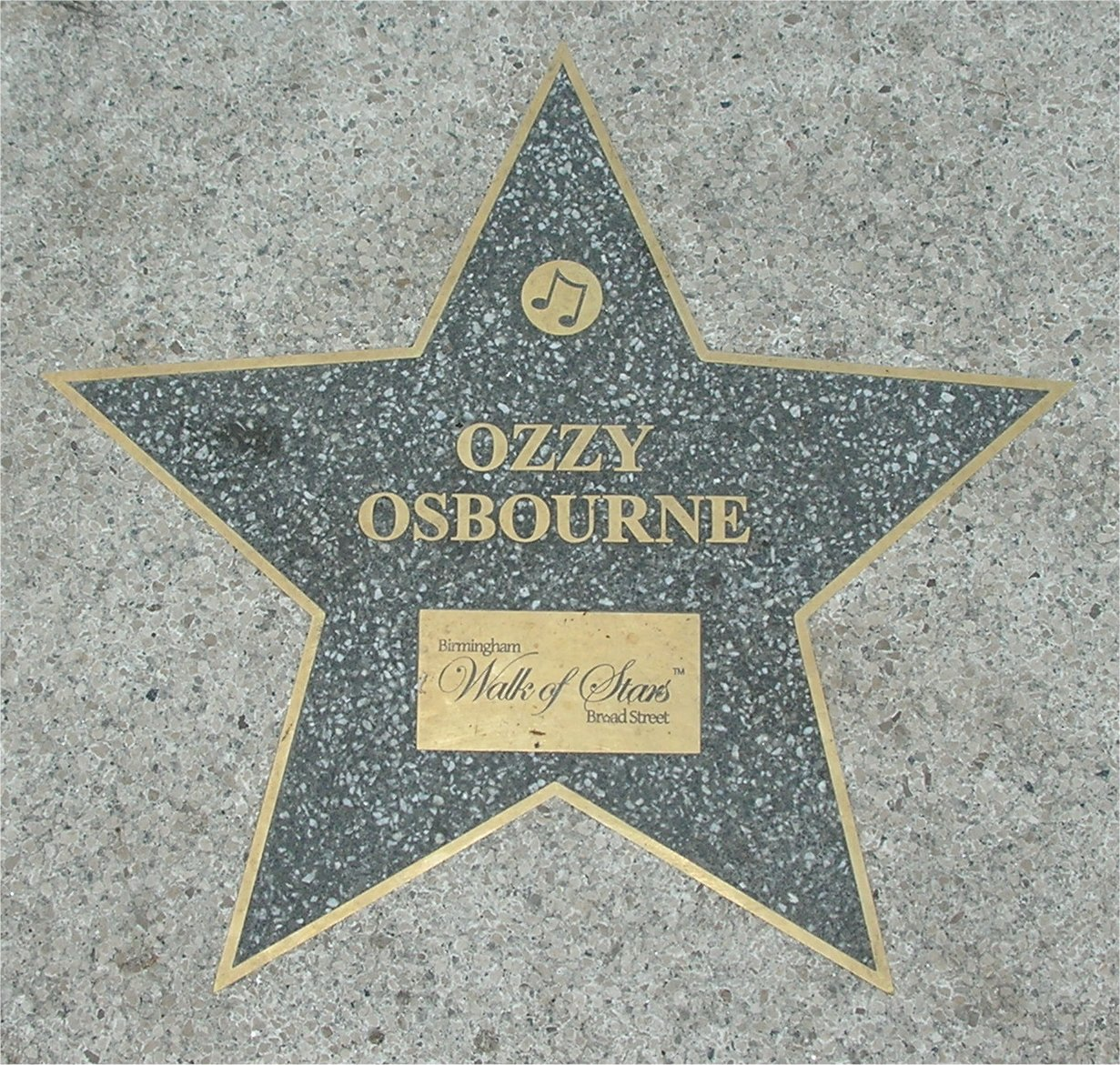
Star for Ozzy Osbourne on the canal bridge pavement of Broad Street in Birmingham

The Birmingham Walk of Stars is a walk of fame-style installation on the pedestrian pavement of Broad Street in Birmingham, England, which honours notable people from the Birmingham area or with significant connections with it. The scheme is organised and funded by the Broad Street Business Improvement District.

The Walk of Stars honours residents of the city who have made a significant contribution to the arts sector, in music, television, film, theatre, sport, business and literacy.

== Criteria ==
The criteria for a person to have their star added to the walk include that they must have performed at one of Birmingham's major venues such as the International Convention Centre (ICC), National Indoor Arena (NIA), Symphony Hall and The Rep theatre. They must also be originally from the area or have prominent links with Birmingham and the Midlands region.

== History ==
The idea for a Walk of Fame style tribute was first thought of by a local Birmingham man Garry Raybould, who then approached the Broad Street Business Improvement District who developed the idea and created the name Broad Street Walk of Stars together with a brand and registration of the original website, www.walkofstars.co.uk which quickly became very popular and was chosen by Radio 2 as 'Website of the Day'. The first star to be honoured was Ozzy Osbourne on 6 July 2007. The event was held in Centenary Square and introduced by Elliott Webb from Birmingham's commercial radio station BRMB and the star was presented to Ozzy by Lord Mayor of Birmingham Randal Brew. The Ozzy Osbourne presentation created £1.7M worth of worldwide publicity for the area.

Comedian Jasper Carrott was the second person to have a star installed on Broad Street on 15 September 2007. The star was presented to him by the Lord Mayor of Birmingham during ArtsFest in front of a 10,000 strong crowd. In December 2007, Noddy Holder became the third inductee on the Walk of Stars which was presented to him on a canal boat, during the Broad Street Christmas Canal Boat Light Parade.

The stars were briefly fenced off following safety concerns about their polished surfaces. Leicestershire-based Charcon Specialist Products, who produced the stars, was consulted over the situation.

Murray Walker was inducted into the Walk of Stars. A joint induction took place on 12 September 2008 for BBC Radio 4 series The Archers and cast member Norman Painting. On 7 October 2008, the BBC announced that Julie Walters would be inducted. The following month founder member of Black Sabbath Tony Iommi was inducted.

On 26 March 2009, it was announced that each of five local football clubs (Aston Villa, Birmingham City, Walsall, West Bromwich Albion and Wolverhampton Wanderers) would have a star commemorating their teams, a player, or a specific era. The presentation ceremonies were staggered between May and August.

== Stars honoured ==
Number	Recipient	Induction date	Profession	Comments	Image	Location
1	Ozzy Osbourne	6 July 2007	Musician	Founding member of Black Sabbath and solo artist		52.47786°N 1.91099°W
2	Jasper Carrott	15 September 2007	Comedian	Comedian, actor and television presenter		52.47539°N 1.91416°W
3	Noddy Holder	9 December 2007	Musician	Member of Slade		52.47706°N 1.91200°W
4	Murray Walker	28 June 2008	Sports commentator	BBC/ITV Formula One coverage		52.47847°N 1.90880°W
5	The Archers	12 September 2008	Soap opera	Long-running BBC Radio 4 serial		52.47825°N 1.90978°W
6	Norman Painting	12 September 2008	Actor	Voice of Phil Archer in The Archers		52.47822°N 1.90985°W
7	Tony Iommi	23 November 2008	Musician	Member of Black Sabbath		52.47827°N 1.91012°W
8	Aston Villa F.C. 1982 Team	4 May 2009	Football team	1982 European Cup-winning team		52.47810°N 1.91054°W
9	Tony 'Bomber' Brown	17 May 2009	Footballer	Professional footballer from West Bromwich Albion F.C.		52.47739°N 1.91158°W
10	Frank Skinner	1 August 2009	Comedian	Co-host of Fantasy Football League		52.47727°N 1.91132°W
11	Gil Merrick	September 2009	Footballer	Professional footballer from Birmingham City F.C.		52.47683°N 1.91230°W
12	Ray Graydon	September 2009	Footballer	Former manager of Walsall F.C.		52.47848°N 1.90879°W
13	Julie Walters	27 October 2009	Actress and comedian	Star of Educating Rita and Harry Potter films		52.47434°N 1.91575°W
14	Gary Newbon	10 December 2009	Television journalism	Sports reporter		52.47845°N 1.90880°W
15	Lenny Henry	19 December 2009	Actor and comedian	Presenter of Tiswas		52.47849°N 1.90879°W
16	Beverley Knight	20 March 2010	Singer			52.47846°N 1.90880°W
17	Joan Armatrading	4 May 2010	Singer			52.47828°N 1.90970°W
18	Chris Tarrant	August 2010	Broadcaster	Host of Who Wants to Be a Millionaire?		52.47841°N 1.90921°W
19	Birmingham Royal Ballet	September 2010	Dance			52.47844°N 1.90947°W
20	David Bintley	September 2010	Dance			52.47842°N 1.90955°W
21	Roy Wood	November 2010	Singer and musician	Member of Electric Light Orchestra, Wizzard and The Move		52.47824°N 1.91024°W
22	Bev Bevan	February 2011	Singer and drummer	Member of Electric Light Orchestra and The Move		52.47817°N 1.91004°W
23	Matt Croucher GC	16 June 2011	Lance corporal	Received the George Cross in 2008		
24	Laurie Mansfield	16 June 2011	Theatrical agent	Represented Jim Davidson, Ken Dodd, Cannon & Ball, The Krankies, Tommy Steele, Eddie Large and Freddie Starr		
25	Sir Keith Porter	16 June 2011	Military surgeon			
26	Nigel Mansell	August 2011	Racing driver	1992 Formula One World Champion		52.47810°N 1.91021°W
27	Malkit Singh	May 2012	Musician	"King of Bhangra"		
28	Harry Moseley	August 2012	Fundraising/charity			
29	Jaki Graham	October 2012	Singer			
30	Ellie Simmonds	December 2012	Paralympian	Multiple gold medal-winning swimmer		
31	David Harewood	July 2013	Actor	Starred in Homeland		
32	Jeff Lynne	March 2014	Singer, musician and composer	Member of Electric Light Orchestra and The Move		52.478539°N 1.909218°W
33	Trevor Francis	November 2014	Footballer	Professional footballer from Birmingham City F.C.		
34	Ian Lavender	22 June 2015	Actor	Private Pike in Dad's Army		
35	Dennis Amiss	11 February 2016	Cricket	Played for England and Warwickshire, and was ECB deputy chairman		
36	Ann Haydon-Jones	11 February 2016	Tennis	First left-handed female Wimbledon winner		
37	Steel Pulse	18 April 2016	Band	Members are Ronald McQueen, Basil Gabbidon, Steve Nisbett, Selwyn Brown, David Hinds and Sidney Mills		
38	Toyah Willcox	11 December 2016	Singer and actress			
39	Don Maclean	11 December 2016	Comedian and actor			
40	Geezer Butler	3 February 2018	Musician	Member of Black Sabbath		
41	Jamelia	11 April 2018	Singer			
42	UB40	27 May 2018	Band	Members include Ali Campbell, Terence "Astro" Wilson, Duncan Campbell, Earl Falconer, Yomi Babayemi and Norman Hassan		
43	Black Sabbath	6 September 2018	Band	Members include Geezer Butler, Ozzy Osbourne, Tony Iommi and Bill Ward		
44	Bill Ward	9 February 2019	Musician	Member of Black Sabbath		
45	Carl Palmer	11 April 2019	Drummer	Drummer of The Crazy World of Arthur Brown, supergroup Emerson, Lake & Palmer and prog rock group Asia, and founding member of Atomic Rooster		
46	John Lodge	11 April 2019	Musician/bass guitarist	Founding member of The Moody Blues		
47	Brian Lara	23 August 2019	Cricket	Scored well for Warwickshire County Cricket Club 1994 Team by Dermot Reeve, Keith Piper, Gladstone Small, Michael Bell and Tim Munton. That year, they won the County Championship, the Sunday League and the Benson & Hedges Cup		
48	Steve Gibbons	6 November 2022	Guitarist and musician	Singer-songwriter and bandleader, his music career spans more than 50 years		

== See also ==
- List of Walks of Fame
