= 1994 Benson & Hedges Cup =

- Administrator(s): Test and County Cricket Board
- Cricket format: Limited overs cricket (55 overs per innings)
- Tournament format(s): Knockout
- Champions: Warwickshire (1st title)
- Participants: 22
- Matches: 21
- Most runs: 246 Darren Bicknell (Surrey)
- Most wickets: 9 Stuart Lampitt (Worcestershire)

The 1994 Benson & Hedges Cup was the twenty-third edition of cricket's Benson & Hedges Cup. It was an English limited overs county cricket tournament which was held between 26 April and 9 July 1994. The tournament was won, as part of their historic treble of County Championship, Sunday League and Benson & Hedges Cup, by Warwickshire. Warwickshire defeated Worcestershire by 6 wickets in the final at Lord's.

Ireland made their Benson & Hedges Cup debut in this competition, losing in the preliminary round to Leicestershire.

== Fixtures and results ==
=== Preliminary round ===
26 April 1994
(scorecard)

Combined Universities; 191/3 (55 overs)	v	Lancashire; 193/3 (51.3 overs)
Richard Montgomerie 52; Mike Watkinson 1/21 (8 overs)		John Crawley 73; James Bovill 2/21 (11 overs)

Lancashire won by 7 wickets
The Parks, Oxford
Umpires: David Constant & Barrie Meyer
Player of the match: John Crawley (Lancashire)

26 April 1994
(scorecard)

Ireland; 160/9 (55 overs)	v	Leicestershire; 164/1 (50.1 overs)
Stephen Warke 53; Alan Mullally 2/30 (11 overs)		Nigel Briers 70*; Alan Lewis 1/22 (7 overs)

Leicestershire won by 9 wickets
Grace Road, Leicester
Umpires: Dickie Bird & Peter Wight
Player of the match: Phil Simmons (Leicestershire)

26 April 1994
(scorecard)

Northamptonshire; 232/7 (55 overs)	v	Middlesex; 236/4 (53.5 overs)
Mal Loye 68*; Phil Tufnell 3/32 (11 overs)		Mark Ramprakash 119*; Kevin Innes 1/25 (6 overs)

Middlesex won by 6 wickets
Lord's, London
Umpires: Chris Balderstone & Roy Palmer
Player of the match: Mark Ramprakash (Middlesex)

26 April 1994
(scorecard)

Minor Counties; 191/4 (55 overs)	v	Nottinghamshire; 195/7 (53.5 overs)
Ian Cockbain 54*; Greg Mike 2/35 (9 overs)		Chris Lewis 48*; David Thomas 3/36 (9 overs)

Nottinghamshire won by 3 wickets
Trent Bridge, Nottingham
Umpires: Vanburn Holder & Allan Jones
Player of the match: Ian Cockbain (Minor Counties)

26 April 1994
(scorecard)

Surrey; 288/3 (55 overs)	v	Somerset; 253 all out (53.2 overs)
Alec Stewart 167*; Graham Rose 1/42 (9 overs)		Mark Lathwell 120; Martin Bicknell 4/49 (10.2 overs)

Surrey won by 35 runs
The Foster's Oval, London
Umpires: Mervyn Kitchen & George Sharp
Player of the match: Alec Stewart (Surrey)

26 April 1994
(scorecard)

Scotland; 157/7 (55 overs)	v	Sussex; 161/2 (40.4 overs)
Jim Love 53; Franklyn Stephenson 2/24 (11 overs)		David Smith 65*; Greig Williamson 1/24 (7 overs)

Sussex won by 8 wickets
County Ground, Hove
Umpires: Trevor Jesty & Alan Whitehead
Player of the match: David Smith (Sussex)

=== First round ===
10 May 1994
(scorecard)

Lancashire; 280/5 (55 overs)	v	Derbyshire; 284/6 (54.5 overs)
Mike Atherton 100; Alan Warner 2/57 (11 overs)		Adrian Rollins 70; Glen Chapple 2/30 (11 overs)

Derbyshire won by 4 wickets
County Ground, Derby
Umpires: Ken Palmer & Nigel Plews
Player of the match: Dominic Cork (Derbyshire)

10 May 1994
(scorecard)

Durham; 190/8 (55 overs)	v	Worcestershire; 191/2 (45.4 overs)
Jonathan Longley 33; Phil Newport 3/14 (11 overs)		Graeme Hick 104*; Alan Walker 1/20 (6 overs)

Worcestershire won by 8 wickets
Grangefield Road, Stockton-on-Tees
Umpires: John Hampshire & John Holder
Player of the match: Phil Newport (Worcestershire)

10 May 1994
(scorecard)

Leicestershire; 241/9 (55 overs)	v	Essex; 246/2 (51.5 overs)
Phil Simmons 57; Mark Ilott 3/28 (11 overs)		Graham Gooch 130*; Adrian Pierson 2/54 (11 overs)

Essex won by 8 wickets
Grangefield Road, Stockton-on-Tees
Umpires: Vanburn Holder & David Shepherd
Player of the match: Graham Gooch (Essex)

10 May 1994
(scorecard)

Yorkshire; 178/6 (55 overs)	v	Hampshire; 182/2 (51 overs)
Martyn Moxon 40; Richard Blakey 40; Norman Cowans 2/35 (11 overs)		Tony Middleton 63*; Mark Robinson 1/12 (7 overs)

Hampshire won by 8 wickets
County Ground, Southampton
Umpires: Barrie Meyer & Roy Palmer
Player of the match: Tony Middleton (Hampshire)

10 May 1994
(scorecard)

Gloucestershire; 189/9 (55 overs)	v	Kent; 193/6 (54 overs)
Tony Wright 55; Alan Igglesden 3/26 (11 overs)		Mark Benson 47; Martyn Ball 2/32 (11 overs)

Kent won by 4 wickets
St Lawrence Ground, Canterbury
Umpires: George Sharp & Peter Wight
Player of the match: Matthew Fleming (Kent)

10 May 1994
(scorecard)

Middlesex; 150 all out (54.3 overs)	v	Warwickshire; 151/7 (53.2 overs)
Mark Ramprakash 42; Tim Munton 3/27 (11 overs)		Trevor Penney 39; Paul Weekes 3/32 (10 overs)

Warwickshire won by 3 wickets
Lord's, London
Umpires: John Harris & Trevor Jesty
Player of the match: Tim Munton (Warwickshire)

10 May 1994
(scorecard)

Sussex; 239/9 (55 overs)	v	Nottinghamshire; 241/3 (49.2 overs)
Alan Wells 51; Mark Crawley 4/43 (10 overs)		Tim Robinson 91*; Paul Jarvis 2/34 (9 overs)

Nottinghamshire won by 7 wickets
Trent Bridge, Nottingham
Umpires: Barry Dudleston & Kevin Lyons
Player of the match: Tim Robinson (Nottinghamshire)

10 May 1994
(scorecard)

Glamorgan; 236/6 (55 overs)	v	Surrey; 240/7 (54.4 overs)
Hugh Morris 55; Joey Benjamin 3/52 (11 overs)		Darren Bicknell 90; Robert Croft 2/29 (11 overs)

Surrey won by 3 wickets
The Foster's Oval, London
Umpires: Graham Burgess & Barrie Leadbeater
Player of the match: Darren Bicknell (Surrey)

=== Quarterfinals ===
24 May 1994
(scorecard)

Derbyshire; 98 all out (44 overs)	v	Worcestershire; 100/1 (18.2 overs)
Colin Wells 25; Stuart Lampitt 6/26 (11 overs)		Graeme Hick 40*; Phillip DeFreitas 1/29 (4 overs)

Worcestershire won by 9 wickets
County Ground, Derby
Umpires: Nigel Plews & Peter Willey
Player of the match: Stuart Lampitt (Worcestershire)

24, 25 May 1994
(scorecard)

Essex; 124/3 (19 overs)	v	Hampshire; 127/1 (17.2 overs)
John Stephenson 47; Shaun Udal 2/17 (4 overs)		Robin Smith 73*; Peter Such 1/29 (4 overs)

Hampshire won by 9 wickets
County Ground, Southampton
Umpires: Jack Bond & Ray Julian
Player of the match: Robin Smith (Hampshire)

- Reserve day used. No play first day.

24, 25 May 1993
(scorecard)

Nottinghamshire; 275/8 (55 overs)	v	Surrey; 278/4 (51.4 overs)
Paul Pollard 104; Adam Hollioake 3/48 (11 overs)		Darren Bicknell 109; Mark Crawley 1/45 (11 overs)

Surrey won by 6 wickets
Trent Bridge, Nottingham
Umpires: David Shepherd & Bob White
Player of the match: David Ward (Surrey)

- Reserve day used. Nottinghamshire were 275/8 (55 overs) at the close of the first day's play.

24, 25 May 1994
(scorecard)

Warwickshire	v	Kent

No result (Warwickshire won on bowl-out 5-4)
Edgbaston, Birmingham

- Reserve day used. No play either day.

=== Semifinals ===
7 June 1994
(scorecard)

Surrey; 267/7 (55 overs)	v	Warwickshire; 270/6 (54.1 overs)
Graham Thorpe 87; Dermot Reeve 3/48 (11 overs)		Brian Lara 70; Tony Pigott 3/43 (11 overs)

Warwickshire won by 4 wickets
The Foster's Oval, London
Umpires: David Constant & Barrie Leadbeater
Player of the match: Dermot Reeve (Warwickshire)

7, 8 June 1994
(scorecard)

Hampshire; 244/6 (55 overs)	v	Worcestershire; 245/7 (52.4 overs)
Robin Smith 108; Phil Newport 2/35 (11 overs)		Gavin Haynes 65; Norman Cowans 4/36 (11 overs)

Worcestershire won by 3 wickets
New Road, Worcester
Umpires: Chris Balderstone & Mervyn Kitchen
Player of the match: Gavin Haynes (Worcestershire)

- Reserve day used. Worcestershire were 118/3 at the close of the first day's play.

=== Final ===
9 July 1994
(scorecard)

Worcestershire; 170/9 (55 overs)	v	Warwickshire; 172/4 (44.2 overs)
Tom Moody 47; Paul Smith 3/34 (11 overs)		Dominic Ostler 55; Phil Newport 1/29 (8 overs)

Warwickshire won by 6 wickets
Lord's, London
Umpires: Dickie Bird & Ken Palmer
Player of the match: Paul Smith (Warwickshire)

== See also ==
Benson & Hedges Cup
