= 1994 Axa Equity & Law League =

- Administrator(s): Test and County Cricket Board
- Cricket format: Limited overs cricket (40 overs per innings)
- Tournament format(s): League
- Champions: Warwickshire (2nd title)
- Participants: 18
- Matches: 153
- Most runs: 773 Carl Hooper (Kent)
- Most wickets: 26 Neil Smith (Warwicks)/Cardigan Connor (Hampshire)

The 1994 AXA Equity & Law League was the twenty-sixth competing of English cricket's Sunday League. The competition was won, as part of their historic treble of County Championship, Sunday League and Benson & Hedges Cup, by Warwickshire County Cricket Club.

== Standings ==
Team	Pld	W	T	L	N/R	A	Pts	Rp100
Warwickshire (C)	17	13	0	3	1	0	54	83.476
Worcestershire	17	12	0	4	0	1	50	77.787
Kent	17	12	0	5	0	0	48	90.318
Lancashire	17	11	0	5	1	0	46	84.664
Yorkshire	17	10	0	6	0	1	42	78.834
Surrey	17	9	0	5	3	0	42	97.99
Glamorgan	17	9	1	6	1	0	40	76.487
Derbyshire	17	8	0	7	1	1	36	86.274
Durham	17	6	1	7	1	2	32	85.571
Leicestershire	17	7	0	9	1	0	30	82.866
Nottinghamshire	17	6	0	8	1	2	30	85.914
Hampshire	17	7	0	10	0	0	28	78.15
Northamptonshire	17	6	1	9	1	0	28	81.302
Middlesex	17	6	0	10	1	0	26	80.816
Sussex	17	5	0	11	0	1	22	77.787
Somerset	17	5	0	12	0	0	20	83.026
Essex	17	4	1	11	0	1	20	72.974
Gloucestershire	17	4	0	12	0	1	18	78.709
Team marked (C) finished as champions. Source: CricketArchive

== See also ==
- Sunday League
