= Darren Altree =

English cricketer

Personal information
- Full name: Darren Anthony Altree
- Born: 30 September 1974 (age 52); Rugby, England
- Batting: Right-handed
- Bowling: Left-arm fast-medium

Domestic team information
- Years: Team
- 1996–2000: Warwickshire

Career statistics
| Competition | First-class | LA |
|---|---|---|
| Matches | 6 | 1 |
| Runs scored | 6 | 6 |
| Batting average | 1.20 | 6.00 |
| 100s/50s | 0/0 | 0/0 |
| Top score | 4 | 6 |
| Balls bowled | 751 | 30 |
| Wickets | 8 | 0 |
| Bowling average | 62.12 | – |
| 5 wickets in innings | 0 | – |
| 10 wickets in match | 0 | – |
| Best bowling | 3/41 | – |
| Catches/stumpings | 1/– | 0/– |
- Source: CricInfo, 18 March 2021

Darren Anthony Altree (born 30 September 1974) is an English first-class cricketer who played for Warwickshire, mainly as a left-arm fast bowler.

== First Class career ==
Altree made his first class debut against Somerset at Taunton in June 1996 with Warwickshire in the midst of an injury crisis, with Tim Munton ruled out with a broken left wrist and captain Dermot Reeve missing due to a chronic hip injury which would force his retirement the next month. Altree finished his debut with match figures of 1/80, and scored 0 not out in each innings. The next month he was part of the Warwickshire side which took on Pakistan and took 2/72 in the first innings, including the prized wicket of Inzamam-ul-Haq, and 3/41 in the second innings- his best bowling in his first class career- as part of a one-sided Warwickshire victory over the tourists. His final first class appearance of the 1996 season was against Surrey at the Oval in late August, an unsuccessful display in which he scored a duck in both innings, and took 0/74 with the ball as Surrey won by an innings and 164 runs.

Altree made just one first class appearance in the 1997 season, against Hampshire, with match figures of 2/119. He also made one appearance in the 1998 season, the opening County Championship match against Durham, but failed to take wickets in either innings. His final first class appearance was against Nottinghamshire in June 2000; but along with the rest of the Warwickshire attack he suffered in Notts' only innings, as Darren Bicknell and Guy Welton scored an unbroken 406 for the first wicket before declaring, the highest first innings partnership in English cricket since 1933. He was released by Warwickshire at the end of the 2000 season, ending his first class career.

== Other cricket ==
Altree played only one List A match, against Berkshire in 1999, in the Natwest Trophy for the Warwickshire Board XI. He scored 6 runs, and failed to take any wickets in his five overs, as Berkshire won by six wickets.

He played 79 games for Warwickshire in the second XI championship, and 47 games for Warwickshire in the second XI cup competition. The 1995 second XI season saw him take 37 wickets at 20.05 including then career best figures of 7/19 as Glamorgan were dismissed for 83. In 1996, he took 62 Second XI wickets at 15.20 each, as Warwickshire's leading bowler, and the second most in the competition, as Warwickshire won the title for the first time since 1979. Against Hampshire in that season, he took 8/58, including a hat-trick of LBWs, with "the menace of [his] left arm-pace". He was once again a regular in the Warwickshire side in the 1997 season, playing 10 matches and taking 30 wickets, but subsequently only played one game in the 1998 season. In the 2000 season, his final season in county second XI cricket, he was once again Warwickshire's leading bowler, taking 51 wickets at 17.49, leading the team in both categories. Darren currently works at the Multi Award Winning Care Home Thurlaston Meadows in Thurlaston, Rugby
