= Asif Din =

British cricketer

Personal information
- Full name: Mohamed Asif Din
- Born: 21 September 1960 (age 66); Kampala, Protectorate of Uganda
- Batting: Right-handed
- Bowling: Leg break

Domestic team information
- Years: Team
- 1981–1994: Warwickshire
- 1997: Marylebone Cricket Club
- 1996–2002: Shropshire

Career statistics
Competition	First-class	List A
Matches	211	256
Runs scored	9,074	5,943
Batting average	30.55	31.11
100s/50s	9/42	7/26
Top score	217	137
Balls bowled	6,573	951
Wickets	79	16
Bowling average	55.60	43.81
5 wickets in innings	2	1
10 wickets in match	–	–
Best bowling	5/61	5/40
Catches/stumpings	114/–	43/–
- Source: Cricinfo, 18 June 2022

Mohamed Asif Din (born 21 September 1960) is a former British cricketer who played county cricket for Warwickshire from 1981 to 1995. A right-handed batsman and occasional legbreak bowler, he is most famous for scoring a hundred and winning the man-of-the-match award in the 1993 Natwest Trophy final, widely regarded as the best domestic final.

== Career ==
Born 21 September 1960 in Kampala, Uganda, Din, like thousands of Ugandan Indians, was expelled from the country in 1972 by Idi Amin. His family arrived in England with £50 to their name.

Asif began playing second XI for Warwickshire in the 1978 season and was introduced to the first team in 1981, making his first-class debut against Yorkshire. He finished his debut season with 878 runs at an average of 26.60. The following season he made a maiden first-class century, against a Middlesex bowling attack containing Wayne Daniel he scored 102 in a team total of 174.

It would be five years before his second first-class century but Asif followed this with a third in Warwickshire's next three-day match a week later. The season was the first in which Asif passed 1,000 runs. He reached that landmark for a second, and only other, time the following season when he scored 1,425 runs at 38.51.

For the rest of his career Asif had more success in List A cricket (one-day cricket). In 1990 he scored 792 runs at 46.58, and was Warwickshire's leading runscorer in all three limited-overs competitions. The following season he scored 682 runs at 45.46 in one-day cricket, the tally contained two centuries including his highest List A score of 137.

Asif's seventh and last one-day century was the most significant as it came in the final of the 1993 NatWest Trophy. Sussex batting first had set Warwickshire a target of 322 in 60 overs, Asif came to the wicket at 93/3 and shared partnerships first with Paul Smith and then Dermot Reeve to take his side to 306 by the time of his dismissal for 104. Warwickshire went on to win the match off the final ball and Asif was adjudged the man of the match.

Previously Asif had helped the county win the same trophy in 1989, again sharing an important partnership in the final with Reeve (this time of 69) and this time being at the wicket as victory was assured against Middlesex; he had also been man of the match in the semi-final this year against Worcestershire where he top-scored with 94 not out. He was also Warwickshire's top scorer in the 1982 final against Surrey, although this time appearing on the losing side.

On Warwickshire's tour of Zimbabwe prior to the 1994 season Asif made his highest first-class innings, against a Mashonaland XI he scored 217, 204 of them on a single day. On the previous year's tour of South Africa Asif had taken his career best bowling figures of 5/61 against Boland.

Asif was a member of the Warwickshire squad that completed the treble in 1994, he played in the final of the Benson & Hedges Cup and made 12 appearances in the Sunday League. In the County Championship triumph he played three matches but failed to pass 50 in four innings. The season also marked Asif's benefit year from which he received £116,853.

After three final one-day appearances for Warwickshire in 1995, Asif played minor counties cricket for Shropshire from 1996 until 2001, in this period he played seven List A matches for the club in the early rounds of the Natwest Trophy.

Asif has served on various committees involved with Warwickshire since 2001 and is a life member of the club.
