= Andy Moles =

English cricketer and coach

Personal information
- Full name: Andrew James Moles
- Born: 12 February 1961 (age 65); Solihull, Warwickshire, England
- Nickname: Molar
- Height: 5 ft 10 in (1.78 m)
- Batting: Right-handed
- Bowling: Right arm fast-medium

Domestic team information
- Years: Team
- 1986–1997: Warwickshire
- 1986/87–1988/89: Griqualand West

Head coaching information
- Years: Team
- 2001: Hong Kong
- 2003–2004: Kenya
- 2005: Scotland
- 2008–2009: New Zealand
- 2014–2015: Afghanistan
- 2021: Bahamas

Career statistics
Competition	First-class	List A
Matches	230	185
Runs scored	15,305	4,733
Batting average	40.70	28.00
100s/50s	29/89	2/15
Top score	230*	127
Balls bowled	1,882	824
Wickets	40	12
Bowling average	47.05	69.50
5 wickets in innings	0	0
10 wickets in match	0	0
Best bowling	3/21	2/24
Catches/stumpings	146/–	50/–
- Source: ESPNCricinfo, 4 September, 2014

Andrew James Moles (born 12 February 1961) is an English cricket coach and former cricketer who played first-class cricket for Warwickshire and Griqualand West. He has served as head coach of numerous international teams, including Hong Kong, Kenya, Scotland, New Zealand, Afghanistan and the Bahamas. In April 2020, Moles had his left leg amputated below the knee, after contracting MRSA.

== Playing career ==
Moles was a gritty and determined right-handed opening batsman. He played from 1986 until his retirement in 1997 for Warwickshire, where he scored 13,316 runs at an average of 38.59. During the late 1980s, he also played domestic cricket in South Africa for Griqualand West and in three seasons managed 1,989 runs at 64.16.

== Coaching career ==
After retiring as a player, he started his coaching career at Griqualand West, staying there for five years. His first appointment as the head coach of a national team came in 2001, when he coached Hong Kong at the 2001 ICC Trophy.

In 2003, he was appointed as the national coach of Kenya, where he had a turbulent time due to infighting between the Kenya Cricket Association and the players which led him to quit the job at the end of 2004. He took over as the coach of Scotland in January 2005 but left the role after less than a year as a result of disagreements with some of the senior players.

He was appointed coach of Northern Districts in New Zealand domestic cricket for the 2006–07 season and in his first season helped guide the team to the State Championship. In November 2008, New Zealand Cricket announced that Moles had been appointed to succeed John Bracewell as the New Zealand Coach. He resigned from that position in October 2009 over differences with senior members of the team.

Moles had a stint as a coach at Wellingborough School in Northamptonshire. before being appointed as batting coach for the Afghanistan national cricket team in June 2014. Later, on 3 September 2014, he was named head coach replacing Kabir Khan ahead of the 2015 Cricket World Cup.

In 2021, Moles was hired as the head coach of the Bahamas national cricket team prior to the 2021 ICC Men's T20 World Cup Americas Qualifier.
