= Michael Bell (cricketer) =

English cricketer (born 1966)

Michael Anthony Vincent Bell (born 19 December 1966) is a former professional English cricketer who played for Warwickshire and Surrey, active from 1992 to 1999. He was born in Smethwick, Birmingham. He appeared in twenty first-class matches as left-arm fast-medium bowler and right-handed batsman. He took 49 first-class wickets, which included three five wicket hauls, with a best performance versus Gloucestershire at Edgbaston of 7 for 48. He scored 109 runs with a highest score of 30 and held eight catches. He also played in 25 List-A matches for both Warwickshire and Surrey, taking 34 wickets including three five wicket hauls, with a best performance of 5 for 19 for Warwickshire versus Leicestershire at Edgbaston. He was also a member of the MCC Young Cricketers at Lord's Cricket Ground for two seasons between 1986 and 1987.

Bell appeared as an extra in the 1996 Only Fools and Horses Christmas special.
