= Neil Smith (cricketer, born 1967) =

English cricketer (born 1967)

Personal information
- Full name: Neil Michael Knight Smith
- Born: 27 July 1967 (age 59); Solihull, Warwickshire
- Batting: Right-handed
- Bowling: Right-arm off break
- Relatives: MJK Smith (father)

International information
- National side: England
- ODI debut (cap 133): 9 January 1996 v South Africa
- Last ODI: 26 May 1996 v India

Domestic team information
- Years: Team
- 1987–2004: Warwickshire

Career statistics
Competition	ODI	FC	LA
Matches	7	205	330
Runs scored	100	6,783	4,967
Batting average	20.00	26.60	21.22
100s/50s	0/0	4/35	2/25
Top score	31	161	125
Balls bowled	261	28,100	11,338
Wickets	6	374	306
Bowling average	31.66	37.34	27.52
5 wickets in innings	0	18	3
10 wickets in match	0	0	0
Best bowling	3/29	7/42	6/33
Catches/stumpings	1/–	73/–	100/–
- Source: Cricinfo, 12 February 2006

Neil Michael Knight Smith (born 27 July 1967) is a former English cricketer who played in seven One Day Internationals from 1986 to 1996. He then went on to work at Warwick School, Myton Road, Warwick as the Groundsman but has recently semi retired. He is the son of the former England Test captain, M J K Smith.

Smith was part of a successful Warwickshire side which won the County Championship under the captaincy of Dermot Reeve in successive seasons in 1994 and 1995. Smith was particularly valuable in one-day cricket, and helped Warwickshire to win the NatWest Trophy in 1989, hitting Simon Hughes for a six in a tense last-over climax in the final. Warwickshire and Smith also won the NatWest Trophy in 1993 and 1995, the Benson and Hedges Cup in 1995, and the Sunday League in 1994 and 1997, the latter when Smith was captain (following his father as Warwickshire captain) and top run-scorer.

The highlight of his brief international career comprised his mixed experiences during a match against the United Arab Emirates during the 1996 Cricket World Cup. He won the man of the match award in this fixture, one of only two that England won in a miserable world cup campaign, although he was also forced to retire ill after vomiting while batting. He also opened the batting in the following fixture against the Netherlands and made his highest one-day international score of 31, but his international career ended a few months later.
