= Jamie Hall =

English cricketer

Personal information
- Full name: James William Hall
- Born: 30 March 1968 (age 58); Chichester, Sussex, England
- Batting: Right-handed
- Bowling: Right-arm off break

Domestic team information
- Years: Team
- 1990–1996: Sussex

Career statistics
Competition	First-class	List A
Matches	97	54
Runs scored	4,997	1,578
Batting average	30.28	29.77
100s/50s	6/30	–/13
Top score	140*	81
Balls bowled	12	–
Wickets	–	–
Bowling average	–	–
5 wickets in innings	–	–
10 wickets in match	–	–
Best bowling	–	–
Catches/stumpings	47/–	10/–
- Source: Cricinfo, 6 September 2011

James William Hall (born 30 March 1968) is a former English cricketer. Hall was a right-handed batsman who bowled right-arm off break. He was born in Chichester, Sussex.

Hall made his first-class debut for Sussex against Glamorgan in the 1990 County Championship. He made 96 further first-class appearances for Sussex, the last of which came against Yorkshire in the 1996 County Championship. In his 97 first-class matches, he scored 4,997 runs at an average of 30.28, with a high score of 141 not out. This score, which was one of six first-class centuries he made, came against Lancashire in 1992. This was on top of 30 half centuries he made. He passed 1,000 runs for a season twice, in 1990 when he scored 1,140 and in 1992 when he scored 1,125.

He also made his List A debut in 1990 against the touring Zimbabweans. Hall would go on to make 53 further appearances in that format, the last of which came against Yorkshire in the 1996 NatWest Trophy. In his 54 List A matches, he scored 1,578 runs at an average of 29.77, with a high score of 81. This score, one of thirteen half centuries he made in that format, came against Surrey in 1992. He left Sussex at the end of the 1996 season.

Hall now works as a director of Posturite Ltd, a company specialising in office furniture.
