= Tim Munton =

English cricketer

Personal information
- Full name: Timothy Alan Munton
- Born: 30 July 1965 (age 61); Melton Mowbray, Leicestershire, England
- Batting: Right-handed
- Bowling: Right-arm medium-fast

International information
- National side: England
- Test debut: 2 July 1992 v Pakistan
- Last Test: 26 July 1992 v Pakistan

Domestic team information
- Years: Team
- 1985–1999: Warwickshire
- 2000–2001: Derbyshire

Career statistics
Competition	Test	FC	LA
Matches	2	252	252
Runs scored	25	1,827	342
Batting average	25.00	10.50	8.55
100s/50s	0/0	0/4	0/0
Top score	25*	54*	18
Balls bowled	405	43,873	13,249
Wickets	4	737	280
Bowling average	50.00	25.86	28.71
5 wickets in innings	0	35	2
10 wickets in match	0	6	0
Best bowling	2/22	8/89	5/23
Catches/stumpings	0/–	82/–	49/–
- Source: CricInfo, 30 December 2021

Timothy Alan Munton (born 30 July 1965) is an English cricketer. He had a long career in county cricket, playing over 500 games combined between first-class and List A, primarily with Warwickshire before ending his career at Derbyshire. He also played two Test matches for England in the 1992 series against Pakistan, and went on a number of England A tours. A medium pace bowler and lower order batsman, cricket writer Colin Bateman stated, "at 6ft 6in, with an ability to make the ball swing, Munton is at his best in English conditions". His time at Warwickshire was a particularly successful one for the club, winning 6 trophies between 1993 and 1995; as a crucial part of that side, Munton was honoured as one of the five Wisden Cricketers of the Year in 1995.

== Early life ==
Munton was born in Melton Mowbray to parents Alan and Brenda. He attended Sarson High School and Edward VII Upper School, where he achieved 8 O-levels and 1 A-level. He made his county second XI debut for his native Leicestershire in 1982, taking three wickets that season in limited action. The 1983 season was similar, with Munton taking 4 wickets for 182 runs across the campaign. His breakthrough to regular second team action came in 1984, where he took 9 second XI wickets at 23.88 each, while scoring 91 runs at 18.20. However, at the end of that season, he was released by Leicestershire, who did not believe he was good enough.

== Professional career ==
After his release from Leicestershire, Munton struggled to find another county to take him on. He came to Warwickshire's attention after dismissing one of the Warwickshire committee, then playing for Nuneaton, in a Central League match, and participating in Webster's Bitter Find-a-Fast-Bowler competition at Edgbaston, where he was invited to winter nets at Edgbaston. He was subsequently offered a contract for the 1985 season by Warwickshire, where he would play the bulk of his career. He made his first-class debut for the county against the touring Zimbabweans in 1985. In a heavily rain affected three day game, in which over 6 hours were lost to the weather, he did not bat and failed to take a wicket in either innings, conceding 35 runs from his 9 overs. In the winter of 1985/6 he played for Victoria University in Wellington, New Zealand.

=== 1986-89 seasons: county regular ===
Munton's first County Championship appearance came in the season following his first-class debut. Over the course of the season, he played in 17 of Warwickshire's 24 County Championship matches, taking 25 wickets at 32.12, with best bowling figures of 4/60 versus Kent.

Munton was a core member of the Warwickshire squad for the 1987 season, playing in 15 of the 24 County Championship matches. His returns improved considerably over 1986, taking 38 wickets across the season at 25.84 each, outperforming overseas player Allan Donald in both respects. Against Surrey in May his contribution was described by Wisden as "match winning" as he had match figures of 8/89; while against Nottinghamshire his "accurate seam bowling" returned him 6/96 in the first innings. However, a mid-season injury meant that he missed all of July's fixtures, and on his return to action he did not take any further five wicket hauls. In List A cricket, he appeared in one of the three Warwickshire matches in the Natwest Trophy; in the Benson & Hedges Cup matches against Yorkshire and Scotland; and was a regular in the Warwickshire side which finished bottom of the Refuge Assurance League.

The 1988 season saw Munton continue his "steady progress" in his returns in the county championship, increasing his season's tally to 46 wickets while lowering his bowling average to 22.76. He also set a new career best bowling analysis, in a game where he "combined hostility and accuracy" to take 6/21 against Worcestershire. Munton's progress continued in 1989, surpassing 50 County Championship wickets for the first time in his career, finishing with 56 at 24.41 apiece, second for Warwickshire only to his new ball partner Donald.

=== 1990 and 1991 seasons: England A call-up ===
The 1990 first-class season was an outstanding one for Munton, taking 75 county championship wickets at 27.81 apiece, with Wisden commenting that "it was fortunate for [Warwickshire] that this shortfall [of wickets from Allan Donald and Gladstone Small] was more than made up for by the advance of Tim Munton" Outstanding performances came in the championship game at Northamptonshire, with match figures of 9/77, the best match figures of his career to date, and against Glamorgan at Edgbaston, with 3/44 in the first innings and 5/64- including all of the Glamorgan top 4- in the second innings Munton did not feature in either of Warwickshire's Natwest Bank Trophy matches; and played in all four of Warwickshire's Benson & Hedges matches without any notable performances as Warwickshire were eliminated at the group stage. In the Refuge Assurance League, in which he played regularly, he took 5/23 from 8 overs against Gloucestershire, which would remain the best List A analysis of his career.

Following this successful season, Munton was selected in the England A tours of both Pakistan and Sri Lanka over the 1990/91 winter. He made his England A debut in a List A match against the Karachi Cricket Association in Karachi, taking 3/28 in his eight overs. However, the tour was called off due to the start of the Gulf War after this one match, with the England side having to flee Pakistan on a "hastily-arranged" flight. Instead, England A toured Sri Lanka from January until March. Munton played in all 5 A team ODIs against Sri Lanka A, along with the first of the three A team Tests. His best bowling analysis on the tour came in the single A team test he played, with 4/61 off 35 overs in the first innings. He finished the tour with 10 first-class wickets at 17.60, with only Andy Pick finishing above him in the averages.

After returning from Sri Lanka the 1991 season proceeded in a similar vein to 1990. He played in all 22 of Warwickshire's county championship matches, taking 71 wickets at 25.28, including no fewer than five five-wicket innings, and two ten-wicket matches. His best bowling performance came against Middlesex at Edgbaston, where he had figures of 8/89 in the first innings and 3/38 in the second innings in an 89-run Warwickshire victory, a performance described by Wisden: "Munton bowled superbly to take a career-best eight for 89 in an unchanged spell of 30.2 overs, underlining both his stamina and his skill". He also had a seven wicket haul in the first innings against Worcestershire at Edgbaston, helping to skittle Worcestershire for 166 in a Warwickshire victory. By this stage there was increasing pressure for Munton to be called up to England's test side; he "was unlucky not to be selected for the Edgbaston Test, where conditions would have suited him so well". Munton was also a first choice List A player for Warwickshire, and performed particularly strongly against Surrey in the Benson & Hedges Cup, taking 4/35, his career best figures in that competition; and took a five wicket haul against Gloucestershire in the Refuge Assurance League, including three wickets in four balls.

=== 1992 season: Test debut ===
Munton was included in the England Test squad from the start of the 1992 summer, with Phil Tufnell, David Lawrence and Dermot Reeve all recovering from injuries. However, he was omitted from the side from the first Test, as England chose an extra batsman in the shape of Mark Ramprakash, and from the second Test as Devon Malcolm returned after a year out of the side. He came into the side for the third Test, after Ian Botham was dropped and Phil Defreitas was declared unfit with a groin strain. However, he struggled with the ball throughout the match, with figures of 1/112 in the first innings and 0/26 in the second, as Pakistan scored nearly 750 runs for the loss of 14 wickets. He was more successful with the bat, scoring 25 not out and putting on a partnership of 64 for the 9th wicket with Ian Salisbury. He kept his place in the XI for the fourth Test at Headingley and took 2/22 in the first innings and 1/40 in the second, with Inzamam-ul-Haq and Ramiz Raja among his victims, as England won by five wickets. He was, however, dropped for the final Test of the summer at the Oval, as Malcolm and Tufnell returned to the side, and did not make the squad for either of the 1992/3 overseas tours.

Despite his appearances for England, Munton played in 15 of Warwickshire's 22 County Championship matches in the 1992 season, and bowled the second most overs in the side after only Allan Donald. He took 42 wickets from those games, at an average of 33.07. He played key roles in several matches: against Derbyshire he took 5/44 in the first innings, including the crucial last wicket when Derbyshire needed a single run to avoid the follow on; and against Leicestershire he took 5/46 in the first innings, with four wickets falling in his first four overs to break the back of the innings, and 7/64 in the second innings. He appeared in all of Warwickshire's fixtures as they made a run to the semi-finals of the Natwest Trophy, conceding just 17 runs off his 11 overs in their semi-final defeat; and played in three of Warwickshire's four games in the Benson & Hedges Cup.

=== 1993 county season: Natwest Trophy win ===
Munton started the season well, taking 7/41 in the first innings of Warwickshire's match against Kent in mid-May. However, that was to prove to be his only five wicket haul of the season, as he missed around a third of the season, from mid-July, with a hip injury sustained in the match against Middlesex. He finished the County Championship with just 25 wickets at 27.08, well short of his returns the previous season, as Warwickshire slumped to 16th in the championship table. With the bat, he accrued just 51 runs in 13 innings.

Despite his injury, he was able to return in time for the final of the Natwest Trophy, against Sussex, bowling 9 overs for 67 runs as Warwickshire won a high-scoring game, which "redeemed an otherwise poor season".

=== 1994 season: the treble ===
From both an individual and a team perspective, the high point of Munton's career came in the 1994 season. Warwickshire won the treble of County Championship, Sunday League and Benson & Hedges Cup, and lost in the final of the Natwest Trophy in what was described by Wisden as "the most remarkable season by any side in the history of English county cricket". With skipper Dermot Reeve playing in fewer than half of Championship matches due to injury, Munton captained the Warwickshire side for nine matches in his absence, and was spectacularly successful, with eight wins from those nine games.

Ever-present in the championship matches, Munton finished as the side's leading wicket-taker in the championship with 81 (the third most in the competition) at an average of 21.58, the eighth lowest average amongst qualified bowlers. He had a number of outstanding match performances in the championship over the year, notably taking five wicket hauls (5/53 and 5/79) in both innings against Northamptonshire; 9 wickets in the match against Surrey, including 5/96 in the second innings; another 10 wicket match display against Essex (6/89 and 4/41); and 7/52 in the first innings against Derbyshire.

Munton was also a regular feature in Warwickshire's one-day sides. He played in every one of Warwickshire's Natwest Bank Trophy matches, and all of the Benson & Hedges Cup matches, winning the man of the match award in the first round match at Middlesex.

Despite his outstanding personal figures and team results across the season, Munton, "especially unlucky", was not chosen on either of England's winter tours.

=== 1995 season : further success and England A ===
After missing the first five championship matches of the 1995 season and the pre-season warm-up fixture against England A after having a back operation, Munton returned to the Warwickshire side to have an excellent season in the County Championship, playing ten of the seventeen games and finishing in the top five of the bowling averages (46 wickets at 19.56) as Warwickshire took the title. In only his second game back, he had a match return of 5/89 against Yorkshire, and was denied a potential hat-trick when Dougie Brown took the last wicket between his overs. He then took 4/14 in the second innings of Warwickshire's heavy win at Leicester. Once again, Warwickshire finished the season as county champions.

In List A cricket he was a crucial part of the Warwickshire team which lifted the Natwest Bank Trophy, despite missing the final through injury. In the quarter-final at Derby, he was man of the match as a result of a 12 over spell which conceded only 13 runs; and he was again man of the match in the semi-final against Glamorgan, this time for an unchanged 12 over spell of 2/18. He missed the entire Benson & Hedges Cup campaign through injury, as Warwickshire were eliminated at the group stage.

Over the 1995/6 winter, Munton was called up to Nasser Hussain's England A side for their tour of Pakistan as a replacement for Gloucestershire bowler Mike Smith, who flew home with a rib injury. In his first appearance on the tour he took 5/54 in the first innings in a first-class fixture against the PCB Patron's XI, including four wickets in 13 balls, and took 2/13 in 11 overs in the second innings. This performance earned him a place in the second A team Test against Pakistan A, in which he finished with match figures of 2/49 in a rain-shortened fixture. He was replaced in the side for the third and final A team Test, which was also the last first class match of a tour which was criticised by Wisden for the paucity of cricket played.

=== 1996-99: injury frustrations ===
Munton's season started poorly, as a broken wrist forced him to miss the first six County Championship matches of the season; in all he played only nine of 17 championship matches across the year. When he did return, he proved less effective than in his dominant 1994 and 1995 seasons, with a return of only 25 wickets at 35.88, and no five wicket hauls. However, he did score his maiden first-class half century, with 54 not out against Worcestershire, as part of a partnership of 141 with Ashley Giles, breaking Warwickshire's record tenth-wicket stand previously held by Reg Santall and Wilfred Sanders.

After several years as vice captain under Dermot Reeve, Munton was appointed Warwickshire first team captain for the 1997 season, but missed the entire campaign after needing surgery for a back injury which emerged immediately before the start of the season. He returned for the 1998 season, having ceded the captaincy to Brian Lara, but was injured after the early season fixture at the Oval, and subsequently missed all but the last seven County Championship matches. In the eight games he did play, he took 36 wickets at an average of 19.19. The same injury ruled him out of both the Benson & Hedges Cup and Natwest Trophy. 1998 was also his benefit season, and raised the figure of £225,000 for him.

Despite further injuries in 1999 which limited him to 13 of the 17 championship matches, Munton was once again Warwickshire's leading wicket taker in first class cricket, with 52 wickets at 19.76. He also obtained his first hat-trick in first class cricket, against Kent, with Rob Key, David Fulton and Trevor Ward his victims, as part of first innings figures of 6/44. He had further championship five wicket hauls against Durham (7/91) and Sussex (7/36) in the last two games of the season.

The Warwickshire season was riven with off-field problems, with the director of coaching Phil Neale leaving, and upset from members regarding whether Dominic Ostler would be given a benefit during the 2000 season. Following the end of the season, Munton asked to be released from Warwickshire, stating that it was due to "a series of circumstances over the past couple of years". His request was granted, and Munton left Warwickshire after 15 seasons.

=== Move to Derbyshire and end of career ===
Following his release from Warwickshire, Munton moved to Derbyshire for the 2000 season where he was "reliable after a slow start, during which he collected every injury going". Across the county championship campaign, he collected 35 wickets at 31.22, with the highlights being a 6/54 during the first innings against Kent, and 7/34 against Surrey in a match where Munton himself said "it was one of those magic days where everything clicks". He was a regular in Derbyshire's List A sides, but had best bowling of only 3/24 against Essex in the National League, as Derbyshire finished bottom of Division 2 in that competition, were knocked out in the group stages of the Benson & Hedges Cup, and were eliminated from the Natwest Trophy in their first match against professional opposition.

Munton's final season in professional cricket came in 2001, where he played 9 championship matches but took only 19 wickets. His final match in first-class cricket came at Edgbaston, where he had played for so long, and saw him both act as Derbyshire captain and score only the fourth half century of his first-class career. Following that game, an injury to his achilles tendon ended his career.

== After retirement ==
Following his retirement, Munton spent three years working for the Professional Cricketers Association. In 2007 he founded a sports marketing company, called BIG Consultancy. He subsequently became Director of Sport at the brand and business development agency UK Champions plc.

Following his retirement from professional cricket, Munton continued to play social cricket for the Staffordshire village side of Meynell, near his home. He told the Sunday Times in 2012 that one of his ambitions was to lose weight and play more social cricket.

== Personal life ==
Munton's first marriage was with Helen, in September 1986. He had two children from this marriage. He subsequently divorced and remarried with Sonia, leading to another son.
