= Dominic Ostler =

English cricketer

Personal information
- Full name: Dominic Piers Ostler
- Born: 15 July 1970 (age 56); Solihull, Warwickshire, England
- Batting: Right-handed
- Bowling: Right-arm medium
- Role: Batsman

Domestic team information
- Years: Team
- 1990–2004: Warwickshire
- First-class debut: 26 May 1990 Warwickshire v Worcestershire
- Last First-class: 2 August 2003 Warwickshire v India A
- List A debut: 20 May 1990 Warwickshire v Gloucestershire
- Last List A: 27 July 2004 Warwickshire v Lancashire

Career statistics
Competition	FC	LA	T20
Matches	205	275	5
Runs scored	10,856	7,238	56
Batting average	34.90	32.16	11.20
100s/50s	16/67	3/50	0/0
Top score	225	134*	23
Balls bowled	251	21	–
Wickets	1	1	–
Bowling average	295.00	14.00	–
5 wickets in innings	0	0	–
10 wickets in match	0	0	–
Best bowling	1/46	1/4	–
Catches/stumpings	259/–	98/–	3/–
- Source: CricketArchive, 27 July 2015

Dominic Piers Ostler (born 15 July 1970) is a former cricketer who played in first-class, List A and Twenty20 cricket for Warwickshire between 1990 and 2004. He also played for the England A cricket team in 1995 and 1996 in first-class and List A games. He was born in Solihull.

Ostler played for most of his career in senior cricket as a specialist right-handed middle-order batsman; he bowled occasionally at right-arm medium pace, was an outstanding fielder at slip and also very occasionally kept wicket. He was a regular in the Warwickshire side pretty much from his debut to the end of 2002, apart from a period in the late 1990s when he lost confidence and form; a second downturn in form led to his retirement in 2003, though he appeared in a few List A matches the following season. He remains as of 2015 a regular player in high-quality Birmingham area club cricket.

Ostler made a low-key entry into Warwickshire's first team, but in his third match in 1990 his steadiness, batting at No 8, helped his side to take a somewhat contrived victory over Derbyshire after Derbyshire has forfeited their entire second innings; he scored 42 not out to seal the win after a late collapse. His highest score of this first season was only 71, but he was consistent and scored 510 runs at an average of exactly 30.00 in his eleven games. The following year, when he was awarded his county cap, he played regularly and made 1284 runs at an average of 36.68; the season also contained his first first-class century, an innings of 120 not out that saved the match against Kent after Warwickshire had been forced to follow on.

That 1991 season set the pattern for the next four years of Ostler's cricket career: he was a consistent if rarely flamboyant scorer and was ever-present in Warwickshire's middle order in both first-class and List A matches. He passed 1000 first-class runs in a season in 1992, 1993 and 1994, and was only 17 runs short in 1995. In each of these seasons, there were large-scale centuries from Ostler. In 1992, he made 192 against Surrey; the following season, the Essex away match produced a score of 174 for him; in 1994, he scored 186 against Yorkshire; and in 1995 his first double-century was a score of 208 in the home match with Surrey.

In the winter of 1995–96, Ostler was picked for the England A tour to Pakistan, where he played in three of the five first-class matches; in the game against Pakistan A, he top-scored in England A's first innings with 68, but in the other tour matches he was not successful. The England A team re-assembled for the first representative match of the 1996 season to play against a team called "The Rest"; England A won the game, but Ostler scored only 13 and he was not then selected for any further representative matches. Ostler's cricket career then went into a severe decline across the rest of the 1990s to the point where, in 1998, he played in only six first-class matches for Warwickshire, scoring just 173 runs, of which 133 came in a single unbeaten innings against the less-than-arduous bowling of Oxford University. His form in List A cricket remained better for longer, but in both 1998 and 1999 he played in only around half of the county's games.

Ostler's return to form and favour came in the 2000 season, when he scored 1096 runs at a career-best average of 49.81; he was also granted a benefit in the 2000 season by Warwickshire. He was heading for similar success in 2001, averaging 47.27 with the bat and having taken 22 catches in just 10 first-class matches, when his season came to an abrupt end with an elbow injury in the July fixture against Derbyshire. Earlier in the 2001 season he had recorded his highest one-day cricket score with an unbeaten innings of 134 against Gloucestershire. He returned for 2002 and scored 1039 first-class runs at an average of 43.29, taking 24 catches in 14 matches as well; the runs included an innings of 225 late in the season against Yorkshire off just 240 balls, which was his highest first-class score. But the following season, 2003, he played only a few games, losing his place in a rotational squad system and not regaining it, and he played just three List A games and one Twenty20 game in 2004 before retiring.
