= Trevor Penney =

Zimbabwean cricketer (born 1968)

Personal information
- Full name: Trevor Lionel Penney
- Born: 12 June 1968 (age 58); Salisbury, Rhodesia
- Batting: Right-handed
- Bowling: Right-arm medium; Right-arm leg break

Domestic team information
- Years: Team
- 1991/92: Boland
- 1991/92–2005: Warwickshire
- 1993/94–2000/01: Mashonaland

Career statistics
| Competition | FC | LA | T20 |
|---|---|---|---|
| Matches | 158 | 291 | 15 |
| Runs scored | 7,975 | 5,141 | 322 |
| Batting average | 39.28 | 28.88 | 35.77 |
| 100s/50s | 15/36 | 0/21 | 0/1 |
| Top score | 151 | 90 | 52 |
| Balls bowled | 259 | 25 | – |
| Wickets | 6 | 1 | – |
| Bowling average | 30.66 | 21.00 | – |
| 5 wickets in innings | 0 | 0 | – |
| 10 wickets in match | 0 | 0 | – |
| Best bowling | 3/18 | 1/8 | – |
| Catches/stumpings | 94/2 | 113/2 | 6/– |
- Source: Cricinfo, 31 March 2012

Trevor Lionel Penney (born 12 June 1968) is a Zimbabwean former cricketer who played for Warwickshire County Cricket Club. Noted particularly for his fielding, he had a first class career average of 39.28 runs per innings. Penney later became an assistant coach of the West Indies cricket team.

== Personal life ==
Penney went to Blakiston Junior School, the same primary school in Zimbabwe as England cricketer Graeme Hick.

== Career ==
A right-handed occasional medium-pace bowler and batsman, he was chiefly recognised for his fielding, being described by The Guardian as 'one of the best fielders to have graced the county game'. Penney played for Warwickshire in the match where Brian Lara scored a world record 501*. In 2003, Penney scored 52 runs from 28 balls in the first Twenty20 match in England.

Whilst still playing, he worked as a specialist fielding coach with the English cricket team, and was a substitute fielder used in the 2005 Ashes series, coming on for Simon Jones. On 22 September 2005 he announced his retirement from first class cricket.

== Coaching career ==
Immediately after retiring as a player, Penney was appointed an assistant coach of Sri Lanka. Penney was later Sri Lankan head coach.

In May 2007, the WACA announced Penney's appointment as assistant coach of the Western Warriors under Tom Moody for the next three years. Penney has also worked as a coach for Indian Premier League teams Kings XI Punjab, Deccan Chargers and Kolkata Knight Riders, and has been assistant coach of Caribbean Premier League teams St Lucia Zouks, St Kitts & Nevis Patriots, and Barbados Tridents.

In 2015, he was appointed Sri Lankan fielding coach for the second time, and he has also worked as a coach for India, and the United States. Penney was later an assistant coach of the Netherlands, and in December 2019, Penney was appointed as an assistant coach of the West Indies cricket team. His role is focused on limited overs cricket. James Foster replaced Penney as Netherlands assistant coach.

In February 2021, he was appointed as the lead assistant coach of Rajasthan Royals ahead of the 2021 Indian Premier League. In April 2022, he was appointed as a head coach for Barbados Royals.
