= Keith Piper (cricketer) =

English cricketer (1969–2026)

Personal information
- Full name: Keith John Piper
- Born: 18 December 1969; Leicester, England
- Died: 9 June 2026 (aged 56); Leicester, England
- Batting: Right-handed
- Role: Wicket-keeper

Domestic team information
- Years: Team
- 1989–2005: Warwickshire

Career statistics
Competition	FC	LA	T20
Matches	200	237	6
Runs scored	4618	970	2
Batting average	19.99	14.26	-
100s/50s	2/14	-/-	-/-
Top score	116*	38*	1*
Balls bowled	34	-	-
Wickets	1	-	-
Bowling average	60.00	-	-
5 wickets in innings	–	-	–
10 wickets in match	–	–	–
Best bowling	1/57	-	-/-
Catches/stumpings	504/36	251/53	3/1
- Source: Cricket Archive, 10 June 2026

Keith John Piper (18 December 1969 – 9 June 2026) was an English professional cricketer.

== Biography ==
Piper was born in Leicester on 18 December 1969. He trained at the Haringey Cricket College.

Keith Piper played for Warwickshire for 16 years as a wicketkeeper. He was part of the team that won the County Championship (as part of an unprecedented treble) in 1994. In that year, he made his highest first-class score of 116 not out, the innings came against Durham in the match made famous by Brian Lara scoring a first-class record 501 not out. Piper and Lara shared an unbeaten partnership of 322, at the time a county record for the fifth wicket.

Piper went on two England A Tours but never played a full international game. He won praise for his role in an England A tour of India and Bangladesh in 1994–5, with Simon Hughes writing that Piper's "wicketkeeping is on a par with anyone in the world".

His off-the-field activities brought an end to his playing career. After serving a drugs ban in 1997, he tested positive for cannabis in the opening round of matches in 2005 and was banned for four months. His playing contract was terminated and Piper announced his retirement. He remained at the club as second XI coach until the end of the 2008 season, when he took voluntary redundancy.

In 2015, he joined the coaching staff of Leicestershire County Cricket Club.

Piper died on 9 June 2026, aged 56. He had been suffering from cancer.
