= Bob White (cricketer) =

English cricketer and umpire (1936–2023)

Personal information
- Full name: Robert Arthur White
- Born: 6 October 1936; Fulham, London, England
- Died: 8 November 2023 (aged 87)
- Nickname: Knocker
- Batting: Left-handed
- Bowling: Right-arm off-break

Domestic team information
- Years: Team
- 1958–1965: Middlesex
- 1966–1980: Nottinghamshire

Career statistics
Competition	First-class	List A
Matches	413	169
Runs scored	12,452	1,379
Batting average	23.18	17.02
100s/50s	5/50	0/2
Top score	116*	86*
Balls bowled	47,694	5,933
Wickets	693	136
Bowling average	30.50	27.47
5 wickets in innings	28	0
10 wickets in match	4	0
Best bowling	7/41	4/15
Catches/stumpings	191/0	44/0
- Source: ESPNcricinfo

Robert Arthur White (6 October 1936 – 8 November 2023) was an English first-class cricketer and umpire. He played or umpired more than 1,200 matches of first-class or List A cricket between 1958 and 2001.

== Cricket career ==
=== Player ===
White joined the Lord's staff at 15 after leaving school. In 1955 and 1956 he did his National Service, mainly in Cyprus.

In 1958 he made his county debut with Middlesex, where he played as a batsman. He had his most successful season in 1963 when he scored 1355 runs, the only time he reached 1000 runs in a season. He was awarded his county cap during the season.

In 1966 White moved to Nottinghamshire, where he developed his off-spin and played as an all-rounder. His best bowling season was 1971, when he was the county's most successful bowler. He took 81 wickets, and achieved his best figures of 7 for 41 against Derbyshire; he had taken 10 wickets for 51 in the match when rain washed out play early on the third day. He made his highest score of 116 not out against Surrey in 1967, when he and Mike Smedley set a Nottinghamshire record of 204 for the seventh wicket after the score had been 64 for 6.

In his final years at Nottinghamshire, White was manager and captain of the Second XI. In his second-last first-class match, against Derbyshire in 1980, he took 4 for 33 in the first innings and 6 for 24 in the second, when Nottinghamshire dismissed Derbyshire for 54 and won by 89 runs.

=== Umpire ===
In 1983 White began a 19-year career as a first-class umpire. He umpired 314 first-class and 323 List A matches before retiring after the 2001 season. His most important appointments were to umpire several quarter-finals of the county one-day competitions.

== Death ==
White died on 8 November 2023, aged 87.
