= Dermot Reeve =

English former cricketer

Personal information
- Full name: Dermot Alexander Reeve
- Born: 2 April 1963 (age 63); Kowloon, Hong Kong
- Batting: Right-handed
- Bowling: Right-arm medium
- Role: All-rounder

International information
- National side: England (1991–1996)
- Test debut (cap 553): 18 January 1992 v New Zealand
- Last Test: 6 February 1992 v New Zealand
- ODI debut (cap 116): 27 May 1991 v West Indies
- Last ODI: 9 March 1996 v Sri Lanka

Domestic team information
- Years: Team
- 1983–1987: Sussex
- 1988–1996: Warwickshire
- 1998: Somerset

Career statistics
Competition	Test	ODI	FC	LA
Matches	3	29	241	301
Runs scored	124	291	8,541	4,173
Batting average	24.80	24.25	34.86	27.45
100s/50s	0/1	0/0	7/52	1/15
Top score	59	35	202*	100
Balls bowled	149	1,147	29,533	12,439
Wickets	2	20	456	294
Bowling average	30.00	41.00	26.82	28.86
5 wickets in innings	0	0	8	1
10 wickets in match	0	0	0	0
Best bowling	1/4	3/20	7/37	5/23
Catches/stumpings	1/–	12/–	200/–	97/–
Medal record
Men's Cricket
Representing England
ICC Cricket World Cup
Runner-up	1992 Australia and New Zealand
- Source: ESPNcricinfo, 22 June 2025

Dermot Alexander Reeve OBE (born 2 April 1963) is an English former cricketer, best known as an unorthodox all-rounder and captain and, most recently, coach of the New Zealand side, Central Districts. He was a part of the English squad which finished as runners-up at the 1992 Cricket World Cup.

Reeve played in three Tests and 29 One Day Internationals (ODI) for England. He played English county cricket for Sussex, Warwickshire and Somerset. He is a former Hong Kong sports personality of the year, gained for his cricketing efforts in that country.

== Early life ==
Reeve was born in Hong Kong in 1963 to parents who were working in the territory as teachers. His mother, Monica, later served as a scorer for a number of England Test matches. He also played for KJS football team alongside captain of the team Steven Markbreiter, who now coaches the Hong Kong-based team Sai Kung Bulldogs.

== Domestic career ==
Reeve first played cricket in England as a member of the Marylebone Cricket Club Young Cricketers – an academy of up and coming young players between the ages of 18 and 20, who are based at Lord's. He signed for Sussex in June of the 1983 English season, and took 42 wickets in the County Championship at 29.35 apiece. He was given little opportunity with the bat, batting at number 10, but performed the duties of night watchman. This helped Reeve show his batting ability when, as night watchman, he made his maiden first class hundred against Surrey at Guildford. He remained with Sussex for six seasons, his most successful being 1987 when he managed a batting average of over 40, and took 42 wickets at an average of under 30 runs.

His lack of a high enough batting position at Sussex led to his move to Warwickshire in 1988, and it was here that he gained his greatest successes. In the batsman-friendly summer of 1990 his average was 54 runs. He also made his highest first-class score of 202 not out (against an attack including Curtly Ambrose), and two other centuries on the way to a total of 1,412 runs. He averaged over 40 runs for Warwickshire during his time at the Midlands club proving the move a good decision and helping him gain international selection.

Reeve was made captain in 1993, and in 1994 led the county to an unprecedented domestic treble; winning the County Championship, the AXA Equity and Law League, and the Benson & Hedges Cup - though they were defeated in the final of the NatWest Trophy. This achievement came alongside well-publicised differences of opinion with Warwickshire's star batsman, Brian Lara, vividly described a few years later by Reeve in his book Winning Ways. He was known for his inventive cricket brain and once held the bat left handed and swept Ravi Shastri against Glamorgan - today known as the switch hit.

He experimented with many improvisations; a particular incident against left-arm spinner, Rajesh Maru, of Hampshire saw him drop his bat to avoid being caught out by the close fielders.

Warwickshire retained their Championship and NatWest Trophy crowns the following season (1995). In this year Reeve completed an unusual hat-trick when he was named man of the match in the final of the NatWest Trophy, the same award he had won in 1986 (when winning the final with Sussex) and in 1989 (with Warwickshire).

Reeve left Warwickshire halfway through the 1996 season. Reeve made over £400,000 tax free during his benefit year with Warwickshire. Reeve was named as one of the Wisden Cricketers of the Year in 1996, and received the OBE for services to cricket that same year. He moved on to become coach to Somerset (for whom he also played several games in one-day cricket in 1998), and also began to work as a cricket commentator for Channel 4 Television.

== International cricket ==
Reeve played for Hong Kong at the 1982 ICC Trophy, averaging 34.50 with the bat and 15.71 with the ball. He returned to international cricket in 1991, playing for England. Reeve played only three Test matches for England, but his improvising style was better suited to One Day Internationals and he made 29 appearances in this form of the game, appearing in both the 1992 and 1996 World Cups, playing (on the losing side) in the final in the former tournament. However, he never scored highly in ODIs, and his batting average would have been considerably lower, but for his high proportion of not-out innings. Perhaps his most important international innings was a rapid 25 not out at the end of the England innings in the 1992 World Cup semi-final against South Africa, a match which England won narrowly.

Reeve returned to Hong Kong in 1994 as part of the England squad which won the Hong Kong Sixes tournament.

== TV commentator and controversy ==
Following his retirement from cricket, Reeve was involved with the Channel 4 broadcasting coverage of cricket from the start when the channel won the rights from the BBC to show England Tests in the UK. Duties included fronting the studio discussions with pundits, commentary, introducing and presenting awards after televised matches, and interviewing both present and past players. His broadcasting appearances featured a repertoire of impersonations of cricketing personalities, such as Imran Khan and Geoff Boycott. In May 2005, Reeve admitted that he had an addiction to cocaine, and had used the drug prior to commentating on the 2004 first Test between England and New Zealand at Lord's. Reeve duly quit Channel Four after working for five years as part of their commentary team. He also admitted to using marijuana whilst he was an active player for Warwickshire but only out of season.

In more recent years, Reeve has worked as a commentator on the BBC Radio show Test Match Special. He also commentated on the Indian Premier League (IPL) English-language television coverage.

Following his cocaine revelations in 2005, Reeve's family built a new life in Australia and New Zealand. Their assets included a $3 million waterfront mansion at Clontarf.

Further scandal was to follow Reeve at the end of 2009, when he was exposed as a seller of Donald Bradman "signatures" on plain card which were later confirmed by the Bradman Museum to be poor copies of the legendary player's signature.

In a 2025 interview with TalkSport Reeve revealed that due to his addictions to cocaine and gambling, he was living on housing benefit in Portsmouth and surviving on £6 a day.

== New Zealand ==
Reeve relocated with his family to New Zealand in 2006, and was named as coach of the Central Districts States Team in July 2008. Despite leading the side to the Plunket Shield four-day final in 2008–09, before winning the 2009–10 Twenty20 competition, his tenure as coach was at times controversial - one particular incident seeing him fined and censured for accusing England international Ravi Bopara of ball-tampering during a domestic one-day match. On 7 April 2010, he ended his stint as coach of the Stags by mutual consent to spend time with his family, now living in Sydney, Australia.

== Indian Premier League ==
He served as an assistant coach for the Pune Warriors India in the 2011 Indian Premier League.

== See also ==
- List of Test cricketers born in non-Test playing nations
