= Warwickshire County Cricket Club =

English cricket club

- One Day name: Warwickshire
- Twenty20 name: Warwickshire Bears

Personnel
- Captain: Ed Barnard; Sam Hain (LA)
- Coach: Ian Westwood
- Overseas player: Jake Weatherald

Team information
- Founded: 1882; 144 years ago
- Home ground: Edgbaston
- Capacity: 25,000 approx.

History
- First-class debut: Nottinghamshire in 1894 at Trent Bridge
- Championship wins: 9
- One-Day Cup/Pro40/Sunday League wins: 5
- FP Trophy wins: 5
- B&H Cup wins: 2
- T20 Blast wins: 1
- Bob Willis Trophy wins: 1
- Official website: edgbaston.com
First-class
One-day
T20

Warwickshire County Cricket Club is one of eighteen first-class county clubs within the domestic cricket structure of England and Wales. It represents the historic county of Warwickshire.

Founded in 1882, the club held minor status until it was elevated to first-class in 1894 pending its entry into the County Championship in 1895. Since then, Warwickshire have played in every top-level domestic cricket competition in England.

Warwickshire currently competes in three main competitions. In the County Championship, they compete in Division One (the top division), and last won it outright in 2026 (for a total of nine championship wins). They also participate in the 50 over Royal London One Day Cup and the T20 Blast.

Warwickshire's kit colours are all white with a dash of navy blue for the county championship, and for short-format cricket, they use navy blue and gold. Shirt sponsors include Haier (County Championship), and Haier (T20 Blast). The club's home is Edgbaston Cricket Ground in central Birmingham, which also regularly hosts Test and One-Day International matches.

== Honours ==
=== First XI honours ===
- County Championship (9) – 1911, 1951, 1972, 1994, 1995, 2004, 2012, 2021, 2026

Division Two (2) – 2008, 2018

- Gillette/NatWest/C&G/Friends Provident Trophy (5) – 1966, 1968, 1989, 1993, 1995
- Sunday/Pro 40 League/CB40/Royal London One-Day Cup (5) – 1980, 1994, 1997, 2010, 2016

Division Two (1) – 2009

- Benson & Hedges Cup (2) – 1994, 2002
- NatWest t20 Blast (1) – 2014
- Bob Willis Trophy (1) – 2021

=== Second XI honours ===
- Second XI Championship (2) – 1979, 1996
- Second XI Trophy (1) – 2006
- Minor Counties Championship (2) – 1959, 1962

== Earliest cricket ==
Cricket may have reached Warwickshire by the end of the 17th century. The Warwickshire & Staffordshire Journal was certainly aware of the sport in 1738 for it carried a report of a London v Mitcham game at the Artillery Ground on 11 August (London won by 1 wicket).

The earliest confirmed reference to cricket in the county is a match announcement in Aris’ Gazette on 15 July 1751.

There was a prominent club in Coventry towards the end of the 18th century which played two well-documented matches against Leicester in 1787 and 1788. Reports of both games are included in Fresh Light on 18th Century Cricket by G. B. Buckley. Leicester won both games by 45 and 28 runs respectively.

== Club history ==
Warwickshire CCC was officially founded on 8 April 1882 at a meeting in The Regent Hotel, Leamington Spa. The club developed so well that by the time of the first official County Championship in 1890 it was playing some of the top first-class counties such as Surrey and Yorkshire. Warwickshire became first-class themselves in 1894 and surprised the cricket world with wins over Surrey at The Oval and Nottinghamshire. They competed in the County Championship from 1895 but despite being strong in batting, their bowling was, until the arrival of Sam Hargreave and Frank Field in 1899, very weak. From 1900 to 1906 they were strong enough to be in the upper-middle reaches of the table, but the decline of their bowling from 1907 returned them to the lower reaches of the table late in that decade.

Frank Foster, who first played as an amateur left-arm pace bowler in 1908 but improved greatly in 1910 as a result of slowing his pace to gain accuracy, still stands as Warwickshire's greatest all-rounder. In 1911 he headed both batting and bowling averages and, along with a fully fit Frank Field, enabled Warwickshire to take the Championship from the "Big Six" for the only time between 1890 and 1935. Foster and Field took between then 238 wickets, but in Wisden nobody doubted that Warwickshire's win was largely caused by an abnormally dry summer, and the following three years saw them return to mid-table although Foster in 1914 displayed all-round form equal to that of 1911.

In 1919, with Foster having had an accident that ended his short career, Warwickshire fell to last in the table. They did not improve a great deal until the 1930s when Bob Wyatt's captaincy and the bowling of Mayer, Paine and Hollies moved them to fourth in 1934, but as Paine rapidly declined, they fell away. When Wyatt left for Worcestershire after World War II, they declined even further despite Hollies' wonderful bowling in 1946 – with no support at all, he took 175 wickets for only 15 each. The acquisition of New Zealand speedster Tom Pritchard gave Hollies the necessary support and by 1948 they had one of the strongest attacks in county cricket. It was this bowling power, along with effective, if not wonderful batting, that gave them the Championship in 1951. However, as with 1911, they fell off rapidly as their batting became unreliable over the rest of the decade. After Hollies' retirement in 1957, there were some very poor seasons (though they came fourth in 1959 due to Mike Smith's superb batting) until Tom Cartwright emerged as a top-class seam bowler in 1962. The county came second in 1964 but did not establish itself at the top until the late 1960s. In 1971 Lance Gibbs' magnificent bowling enabled them to come second, whilst brilliant batting gave them a clear Championship win in 1972.

Yet again, though, a Championship win was followed by a decline and the next twenty years saw the county almost always in the lower half of the table. In 1981 and 1982, with Bob Willis doing nothing for them whilst producing match-winning form for England, they averaged over 45 runs for each wicket they took – still a record. Only under the coaching of Bob Woolmer and captaincy of Dermot Reeve (with their allowed foreign player being one of Brian Lara, Shaun Pollock or Allan Donald) did the team become consistently successful. Although they had won the NatWest Trophy in 1989, it was their astonishing victory in the same competition in 1993, overhauling a record score posted by Sussex in the final, which launched their most dominant period in English cricket. In 1994 they secured a historic treble, winning the County Championship, Axa Equity & Law League (later the National Cricket League and Pro40) and Benson & Hedges Cup. In that season Lara set the world record for a first-class cricket score of 501 whilst playing for Warwickshire against Durham County Cricket Club; the team total of 810–4 declared in that match is also a club record. In 1995 they won the County Championship again, and also won the C&G Trophy. This was to be the last trophy of Dermot Reeve's captaincy with him stepping down during the 1996 season, Bob Woolmer also having moved on to coach South Africa. 1997 saw them lifting the AXA league trophy once again, but this proved to be a false dawn. Performances for the next few years were poor, including relegation to the second division of the County Championship and National Cricket leagues.

However they have since been promoted in both competitions (though relegated again in the National Cricket League), won the Benson & Hedges Cup in 2002 and strong performances with the bat saw the county reclaim the County Championship in 2004. Warwickshire were once again promoted in the national cricket league and played in the top division of both competitions in 2006.

Until the year 2005, the club captain was Nick Knight, the coach was John Inverarity, and the Chief Executive was Dennis Amiss, though all three stepped down at the end of the season. Heath Streak was appointed as captain for the 2006 and 2007 seasons, but resigned after one game of the 2007 season on 25 April 2007, and Darren Maddy replaced Streak as captain.

The 2007 Championship season was a big disaster for Warwickshire, who were relegated to Division Two, after not winning a single game since they topped the table in early May. They also got relegated from Pro40 league, a matter made worse when local rivals Worcestershire CCC clinched the title.

Since the end of the disastrous 2007 season, Warwickshire made several changes to the team and management staff. Controversial coach Mark Greatbatch was sacked and Ashley Giles replaced him as Director of Cricket. Former Warwickshire Bear and South Africa international Allan Donald joined the Bears' coaching staff. Fans favourite Dougie Brown also took up an Academy Coaching role. After a successful campaign in Division 2, the Bears were promoted back to the top flight after only a season's absence in September 2008.

Maddy stepped down from the captaincy in November 2008. Ian Westwood was announced as his replacement. In 2009 Indian seamer Sreesanth replaced Jeetan Patel, who was busy with national duties for New Zealand, to become the first Indian to join the club. Westwood, in turn, stepped down as captain at the end of the 2010 season. Jim Troughton took over as captain shortly after, before struggling with injury during the 2014 season. Varun Chopra stood in before Troughton retired from first-class cricket in 2015, promoting Chopra to permanent captain.

Early in 2016, Varun Chopra resigned the captaincy in order to focus on batting, with Ian Bell taking over as captain.

At the end of the 2016 season despite winning the Royal London Cup earlier in the season, Director of Cricket Dougie Brown was replaced by Jim Troughton as Head Coach with former Director of Cricket Ashley Giles returning to Edgbaston to take responsibility for all cricket associated with Warwickshire. Bell resigned as captain on 20 August 2017.

In 2021 Warwickshire won the County Championship under the captaincy of Will Rhodes and coach Mark Robinson. They completed a domestic double that season beating Lancashire in the Bob Willis Trophy.

Despite their double the next season almost saw Warwickshire relegated to Division 2. They were only saved by a 9 wicket haul from Liam Norwell, who took 9-62 on the final day of the season to beat Hampshire by five runs and relegate Yorkshire.

At the start of the 2026 season Ian Westwood was named as first team coach and Ed Barnard as captain. Warwickshire won the County Championship with Ethan Bamber as the top wicket taker with 69 wickets.

=== Twenty20 Cup history ===
2003

Warwickshire's first-ever game in Twenty20 cricket was against Somerset at Taunton, where the Bears defeated the Sabres by 19 runs. This result was followed by wins over Worcestershire (by 20 runs), Glamorgan (by 68 runs), and Northamptonshire (by 54 runs). Gloucestershire, who finished first in the division, were the only team to beat the Bears when they won by 8 wickets at Edgbaston. This meant that Warwickshire finished second in the Midlands, West and Wales Division behind Gloucestershire, and qualified for the finals day as the best runner-up.

The finals day was held on 19 July at Trent Bridge, Nottingham. Warwickshire met Leicestershire in their semi-final, who they defeated by 7 wickets, with Trevor Penney top-scoring for the Bears with 43 runs. Surrey claimed victory over Gloucestershire in their semi-final to set up a Surrey-Warwickshire final. Unfortunately, Warwickshire were unable to perform in the final and only scored 115 runs. Surrey managed to score 119 runs in just 11 overs and claimed victory.

2004

With expectations high at Edgbaston, Warwickshire entertained Somerset in the first clash of the 2004 season. The Bears secured victory by 7 wickets. After Warwickshire lost to Glamorgan (by 26 runs), things started to look bad for the Bears. Defeats against Worcestershire (by 3 wickets), and Northamptonshire (by 4 wickets), left the team in danger of not qualifying for the Quarter-Finals, but victory over Gloucestershire (by 2 wickets) on the last day, meant that Warwickshire qualified as one of the best third-placed team.

The Bears drew Glamorgan in the quarter-finals. Although they had managed to beat Glamorgan at Cardiff once, Warwickshire were not able to achieve victory again, and lost by 5 wickets to the Dragons, who progressed to the finals day, and eventually went out to the 2004 victors, the Leicestershire Foxes.

2005

With changes to the format for the 2005 season, Warwickshire now had to play 8 games in the group stage to qualify. Their first game of the season was against Worcestershire at New Road, where the Bears lost by only 1 run. This was followed by defeats to Northamptonshire (by 38 runs), and another 1-run defeat to Worcestershire. Warwickshire secured qualification from the MMW division in second after victories over Glamorgan (by 20 runs and by 4 runs) Somerset (by 47 runs) Northamptonshire (by 41 runs), and a no-result against Gloucestershire.

Warwickshire bowed out of the competition in the quarter-final to Surrey. After sharing a nail-biting draw (Surrey 149 (20 Overs), Warwickshire 115 (15 Overs)), a bowl off followed, with Surrey claiming victory 4–3. Surrey would go on to be defeated in the Semi-Final to Lancashire, who themselves lost in the final to Somerset.

2006

Warwickshire started the 2006 season by playing Northamptonshire at the County Ground, Northampton where the Bears won by 24 runs. This was followed by wins over Somerset (by 7 wickets), Northampton (by 20 runs), Worcestershire (by 11 runs); defeats to Glamorgan (by 6 wickets), Gloucestershire (by 3 runs), Worcestershire (by 4 runs), and a no-result against Glamorgan. Warwickshire secured third position in the table, but their record was worse than both Yorkshire and Kent (who both finished third in their respected leagues), so did not qualify for the quarter-final.

The final's day was once again controlled by Leicestershire, who beat Nottinghamshire in a spectacular final that lasted to the last over of the game.

2007

Warwickshire recruited the services of twice winner, and Twenty20 expert Darren Maddy for the 2007 season, and his expertise helped the team to once again reach the quarter-finals of the competition. The Bears started with a victory over Somerset by 7 runs. This was followed by wins against Glamorgan (by 3 runs and by 9 runs) Northamptonshire (by 12 runs), Gloucestershire (by 27 runs), defeats against Northamptonshire (by 4 wickets), Worcestershire (by 13 runs), and no results against Worcestershire. The Bears qualified as the MMW leaders, with 11 points from 8 games.

In the quarter-final, Warwickshire hosted Lancashire in an entertaining game. After Lancashire set the Bears 194 to win, Warwickshire were able to claw back to 187 for 7, and lost by 7 runs. It was Lancashire who would go through to face Gloucestershire, Sussex, and Kent on the Finals day, held at Edgbaston in August.

2012

Warwickshire finished fourth of six teams in the Midlands/Wales/West division, failing to make the quarter-finals.

2013

Warwickshire finished fourth of six teams in the Midlands/Wales/West division, failing to make the quarter-finals. After the season, Warwickshire changed their name to Birmingham Bears for T20 competitions. The Bears has been synonymous with the team for many years and will continue to play under the Warwickshire banner in the other two competitions.

2014

The Birmingham Bears came fourth in the North Group (behind Lancashire Lightning, Nottinghamshire Outlaws and Worcestershire Rapids) to qualify for the knockout stages. They faced Essex in the quarter-finals which they won by 19 Runs, to reach finals day at their home ground. On Finals Day, having beaten Surrey in the semi-final, they went on to beat Lancashire by 4 runs to win their first T20 title.

== List of captains ==
Daes	Name
1882–1883	(England) D. Buchanan
1884–1886	(England) H. Rotherham
1887–1901	(England) H. W. Bainbridge
1902	(England) H. W. Bainbridge and (England) T. S. Fishwick
1903–1906	(England) J. F. Byrne
1907	(England) T. S. Fishwick and (England) J. F. Byrne
1908–1909	(England) A. C. S. Glover
1910	(England) H. J. Goodwin
1911–1914	(England) F. R. Foster
1919	(England) G. W. Stephens
1920–1929	(England) F. S. G. Calthorpe
1930–1937	(England) R. E. S. Wyatt
1938–1947	(England) P. Cranmer
1948	(England) H. E. Dollery and (England) R. H. Maudsley
1949–1955	(England) H. E. Dollery
1956	(England) W. E. Hollies
1957–1967	(England) M. J. K. Smith
1968–1974	(England) A. C. Smith
1975–1977	(England) D. J. Brown
1978–1979	(England) J. Whitehouse
1980–1984	(England) R. G. D. Willis
1985–1987	(England) N. Gifford
1988–1992	(England) T. A. Lloyd
1993–1996	(England) D. A. Reeve
1997	(England) T. A. Munton
1998	(Trinidad and Tobago) B. C. Lara
1999–2000	(England) N. M. K. Smith
2001–2003	(England) M. J. Powell
2003–2005	(England) N. V. Knight
2006–2007	(Zimbabwe) H. H. Streak
2007–2008	(England) D. L. Maddy
2009–2010	(England) I. J. Westwood
2011–2014	(England) J. O. Troughton
2014	(England) V. Chopra
2015–2017	(England) I. R. Bell
2018–2019	(New Zealand) J. S. Patel
2020–2023	(England) W. M. H. Rhodes
2024–2025	(England) A. L. Davies
2026	(England) E.G. Barnard

== Players ==
=== Current squad ===
- No. denotes the player's squad number, as worn on the back of their shirt.
- ‡ denotes players with international caps.
- * denotes a player who has been awarded a county cap.

No.	Name	Nationality	Birth date	Batting style	Bowling style	Notes
Batters
8	Zen Malik	England	9 April 1998 (age 28)	Right-handed	Right-arm leg break	
16	Sam Hain* ‡	England	16 July 1995 (age 31)	Right-handed	Right-arm off break	Captain (LA)
17	Rob Yates*	England	19 September 1999 (age 27)	Left-handed	Right-arm off break	
24	Vansh Jani	England	6 June 2005 (age 21)	Right-handed	Right-arm off break	
All-rounders
2	Jacob Bethell ‡	England	23 October 2003 (age 22)	Left-handed	Slow left-arm orthodox	England central contract
14	Charlie Taylor	England	7 December 2009 (age 16)	Right-handed	Right-arm fast-medium	
19	Chris Woakes* ‡	England	2 March 1989 (age 37)	Right-handed	Right-arm fast-medium	
30	Ed Barnard*	England	20 November 1995 (age 30)	Right-handed	Right-arm fast-medium	Club captain
80	Dan Mousley ‡	England	8 July 2001 (age 25)	Left-handed	Right-arm off break	
Wicket-keepers
11	Kai Smith	United Arab Emirates	28 November 2004 (age 21)	Right-handed	—	UK passport
71	Alex Davies*	England	23 August 1994 (age 32)	Right-handed	—	
Bowlers
7	George Garton ‡	England	15 April 1997 (age 29)	Left-handed	Left-arm fast	
10	Tazeem Ali	England	13 June 2006 (age 20)	Right-handed	Right-arm leg break	
18	Nathan Gilchrist	Zimbabwe	11 June 2000 (age 26)	Left-handed	Right-arm fast-medium	UK passport
20	Oliver Hannon-Dalby*	England	20 June 1989 (age 37)	Left-handed	Right-arm fast-medium	
27	Michael Booth	South Africa	12 February 2001 (age 25)	Right-handed	Right-arm fast-medium	Domestic player
33	Richard Gleeson ‡	England	2 December 1987 (age 38)	Right-handed	Right-arm fast-medium	White ball contract
44	Jordan Thompson	England	9 October 1996 (age 29)	Left-handed	Right-arm fast-medium	
54	Ethan Bamber*	England	17 December 1998 (age 27)	Right-handed	Right-arm fast-medium	
Source: Updated: 27 September 2026

== Notable Warwickshire players ==
England

- (England) Dennis Amiss
- (England) Bob Barber
- (England) Ian Bell
- (England) David Brown
- (England) Tom Cartwright
- (England) Tom Dollery
- (England) Frank Foster
- (England) Ashley Giles
- (England) Eric Hollies
- (England) John Jameson
- (England) Nick Knight
- (England) Dick Lilley
- (England) Tim Munton
- (England) George Paine
- (England) Keith Piper
- (England) Willie Quaife
- (England) Boyd Rankin
- (England) Dermot Reeve
- (England) Gladstone Small
- (England) A. C. Smith
- (England) M. J. K. Smith
- (England) Neil Smith
- (England) Paul Smith
- (England) Tiger Smith
- (England) Dick Spooner
- (England) Jonathan Trott
- (England) Jim Troughton
- (England) Bob Willis
- (England) Chris Woakes
- (England) R. E. S. Wyatt

India

- (India) S. Sreesanth
- (India) Hanuma Vihari

Ireland

- (Ireland) William Porterfield
- (Ireland) Boyd Rankin
- (Ireland) Mark Adair

Kenya

- (Kenya) Collins Obuya

New Zealand

- (New Zealand) Martin Donnelly
- (New Zealand) Brendon McCullum
- (New Zealand) Jeetan Patel
- (New Zealand) Tom Pritchard
- (New Zealand) Roger Twose
- (New Zealand) Daniel Vettori

Pakistan

- (Pakistan) Younis Khan
- (Pakistan) Waqar Younis
- (Pakistan) Mohammad Yousuf

Scotland

- (Scotland) Dougie Brown
- (Scotland) Navdeep Poonia

South Africa

- (South Africa) Allan Donald
- (South Africa) Shaun Pollock
- (South Africa) Dale Steyn
- (South Africa) Imran Tahir
- (South Africa) Monde Zondeki

Sri Lanka

- (Sri Lanka) Kumar Sangakkara

West Indies

- (Cricket West Indies) Shivnarine Chanderpaul
- (Cricket West Indies) Lance Gibbs
- (Cricket West Indies) Alvin Kallicharran
- (Cricket West Indies) Rohan Kanhai
- (Cricket West Indies) Brian Lara
- (Cricket West Indies) Deryck Murray
- (Cricket West Indies) Kraigg Brathwaite

Zimbabwe

- (Zimbabwe) Trevor Penney
- (Zimbabwe) Heath Streak

For a full list of Warwickshire players see List of Warwickshire CCC players.

== Records ==
=== First-class runs ===
Qualification: at least 20,000 runs

Player	Run
Dennis Amiss	35,146
Willie Quaife	33,862
Mike Smith	27,672
Tom Dollery	23,458
Bob Wyatt	21,687

=== First-class wickets ===
Qualification: at least 1,000 wickets

Player	Wickets
Eric Hollies	2,201
Sydney Santall	1,207
Jack Bannister	1,181
Joseph Mayer	1,142
Tom Cartwright	1,058
David Brown	1,005

=== Other records ===
Record name	Record value	Record holder	Opposition	Location	Year
Team totals
Highest total for	810-4 dec	v. Durham		Birmingham	1994
Highest total against	887	v. Yorkshire		Birmingham	1986
Lowest total for	16	v. Kent		Tonbridge	1913
Lowest total against	15	v. Hampshire		Birmingham	1922
Batting
Highest score^{1}	501*	B. C. Lara	Durham	Birmingham	1994
Most runs in season	2417	M. J. K. Smith	1959		
Best partnership for each wicket
1st	377*	N. F. Horner; K. Ibadulla	Surrey	The Oval	1960
2nd	465*	J. A. Jameson; R. B. Kanhai	Gloucestershire	Birmingham	1974
3rd	327	S. P. Kinneir; W. G. Quaife	Lancashire	Birmingham	1901
4th	470	A. I. Kallicharran; G. W. Humpage	Lancashire	Southport	1982
5th	335	J. O. Troughton; T. R. Ambrose	Hampshire	Birmingham	2009
6th	327	L. J. Evans; T. R. Ambrose	Sussex	Birmingham	2015
7th	289*	I. R. Bell; T. Frost	Sussex	Horsham	2004
8th	228	A. J. W. Croom; R. E. S. Wyatt	Worcestershire	Dudley	1925
9th	233	I. J. L. Trott; J. S. Patel	Yorkshire	Birmingham	2009
10th	214	N. V. Knight; A. Richardson	Hampshire	Birmingham	2002
Bowling
Best bowling	10–41	J. D. Bannister	Combined Services	Birmingham (M&B)	1959
Best match bowling	15–76	S. Hargreave	Surrey	The Oval	1903
Wickets in season	180	W. E. Hollies	1946		

Notes

1. Brian Lara's 501* in 1994 is a current world record.

== Birmingham Bears ==
Birmingham Bears
Personnel
- Captain: Ed Barnard
- Coach: Ian Westwood
- Overseas player: Beau Webster

Team information
- Founded: 2003
- Home ground: Edgbaston
- Capacity: 25,000

History
- Twenty20 debut: v. Yorkshire, 23 May 2014, Edgbaston, Birmingham
- Natwest T20 Blast wins: 1
- Official website: edgbaston.com/bears/
T20I kit

Birmingham Bears are a former T20 cricket team located in Birmingham, founded as Warwickshire Bears in 2003 and rebranded as Birmingham Bears in 2014. In 2026 they rebranded back to Warwickshire, so as to differentiate themselves from the Birmingham Phoenix. They are a part of Warwickshire County Cricket Club and play at Edgbaston Cricket Ground in the Edgbaston area of Birmingham. They have won one Natwest T20 Blast, the 2014 t20 Blast, beating Lancashire Lightning in the final at Edgbaston. Their playing squad and coaching staff are the same as the Warwickshire first-class and List A team, although an additional overseas player is granted for the T20 Blast.

Under the guidance of Dougie Brown and captained by Jim Troughton Birmingham won 7 of their 14 group games, finishing fourth in the North Group and qualifying for the quarter-finals. In the quarter-finals they defeated Essex by 19 runs, qualifying for Finals Day. In their Finals Day semi-final, they defeated Surrey by 16 runs, setting up a final with Lancashire. In the Final they defeated Lancashire by 4 runs, securing them their first Twenty20 title. The overseas players were Shoaib Malik and Jeetan Patel, who finished the season as leading wicket-taker with 25 wickets.

This season captained by Varun Chopra Birmingham won 10 of their 14 group games, finishing top of the North Group and qualifying for the quarter-finals. Once again they met Essex in the quarter-finals, defeating them again by 24 runs. At Finals Day however they lost their semi-final to Northamptonshire who would go on to win the title. Jeetan Patel returned as an overseas player, but was this year joined by fellow New Zealander Brendon McCullum. The Bears also set the highest team score of the competition, scoring 242/2 against Derbyshire in the group stages, with McCullum scoring 158 not out in this game.

Once again under a new captain in Ian Bell Birmingham performed poorly, finishing sixth in the North Group winning just 6 of their 14 games. Jeetan Patel returned as overseas player for a third season, this year joined by wicketkeepers Luke Ronchi and Matthew Wade who both played half the tournament each.

Under new leadership for the fourth season, this time by former New Zealand international Grant Elliott and new coaching in former player Jim Troughton the Bears improved on their previous season, winning 8 of their 14 group games, finishing third in the North Group qualifying them for the quarter-finals. In the quarter-final they met Surrey defeating them by 6 wickets in a high-scoring game, qualifying them for Finals Day. In the semi-final they met Glamorgan, winning by 11 runs qualifying them for the Final. However, they lost the final to Nottinghamshire by 22 runs. Patel returned as overseas player for a fourth season, this year joined by Colin de Grandhomme, with captain Elliott qualifying as a Kolpak player due to being born in South Africa.

Under the same captain and same coaching, with the same overseas players, the Bears missed out on the quarter-finals for just the second time in their history, winning just 6 of their 14 group games. Former England international Ian Bell though finished as third top run-scorer, finishing the season with 580 runs from his 14 games.
