= 1996 NatWest Trophy =

- Administrator: Test and County Cricket Board
- Cricket format: Limited overs cricket (60 overs per innings)
- Tournament format: Knockout
- Champions: Lancashire (6th title)
- Participants: 32
- Matches: 30
- Most runs: 291 Stuart Law (Essex)
- Most wickets: 12 Peter Martin (Lancashire)

The 1996 NatWest Trophy was the 16th NatWest Trophy. It was an English limited overs county cricket tournament which was held between 25 June and 7 September 1996. The tournament was won by Lancashire County Cricket Club who defeated Essex County Cricket Club by 129 runs in the final at Lord's.

== Format ==
The 18 first-class counties, were joined by eleven Minor Counties: Berkshire, Cambridgeshire, Cheshire, Cornwall, Cumberland, Devon, Lincolnshire, Norfolk, Oxfordshire, Staffordshire and Suffolk. The Ireland national cricket team, Scotland national cricket team and the Netherlands national cricket team also participated. Teams who won in the first round progressed to the second round. The winners in the second round then progressed to the quarter-final stage. Winners from the quarter-finals then progressed to the semi-finals from which the winners then went on to the final at Lord's which was held on 7 September 1996.

=== First round ===
25 June 1996
(scorecard)

Kent; 275/5 (60 overs)	v	Cambridgeshire; 182 all out (58.3 overs)
Nigel Llong 115*; Kevin Masters 2/52 (12 overs)		Giles Ecclestone 92; Nigel Llong 3/36 (9 overs)

Kent won by 93 runs
The Avenue Sports Club Ground, March
Umpires: David Constant & Mervyn Kitchen
Player of the match: Nigel Llong (Kent)

25 June 1996
(scorecard)

Warwickshire; 311/9 (60 overs)	v	Cornwall; 178 all out (50.5 overs)
Trevor Penney 90; David Angove 4/65 (12 overs)		Steve Williams 52; Neil Smith 3/40 (12 overs)

Warwickshire won by 133 runs
Wheal Eliza, St Austell
Umpires: R. Dennis & Roy Palmer
Player of the match: David Angove (Cornwall)

25 June 1996
(scorecard)

Middlesex; 270/8 (60 overs)	v	Cumberland; 168 all out (49.5 overs)
Mike Gatting 71; Michael Scothern 3/29 (11 overs)		Paul Beech 42; Paul Weekes 3/35 (7.5 overs)

Middlesex won by 102 runs
Edenside, Carlisle
Umpires: Vanburn Holder & George Sharp
Player of the match: Mike Gatting (Middlesex)

25 June 1996
(scorecard)

Durham; 300/7 (60 overs)	v	Scotland; 202/6 (60 overs)
John Morris 109 (121); David Cowan 2/52 (9 overs)		George Reifer 103 (173); Melvyn Betts 3/33 (12 overs)

Durham won by 98 runs
Riverside Ground, Chester-le-Street
Umpires: Michael Johnson & Ken Palmer
Player of the match: John Morris (Durham)

25 June 1996
(scorecard)

Essex; 312/5 (60 overs)	v	Devon; 193 all out (46.3 overs)
Nasser Hussain 105; Keith Donohue 3/41 (12 overs)		Nick Folland 64; Stuart Law 3/36 (6.3 overs)

Essex won by 119 runs
County Ground, Chelmsford
Umpires: Allan Jones & Martin Reed
Player of the match: Nasser Hussain (Essex)

25 June 1996
(scorecard)

Worcestershire; 253/9 (60 overs)	v	Glamorgan; 210 all out (57 overs)
Tom Moody 123; Owen Parkin 3/23 (12 overs)		Gary Butcher 48; Stuart Lampitt 3/35 (11 overs)

Worcestershire won by 43 runs
Sophia Gardens, Cardiff
Umpires: Jack Bond & Barrie Leadbeater
Player of the match: Tom Moody (Worcestershire)

25 June 1996
(scorecard)

Hampshire; 322/6 (60 overs)	v	Norfolk; 223 all out (54.4 overs)
Jason Laney 153; Steve Goldsmith 4/64 (12 overs)		Neil Fox 68; Cardigan Connor 3/39 (11.4 overs)

Hampshire won by 99 runs
County Ground, Southampton
Umpires: John Harris & Peter Willey
Player of the match: Jason Laney (Hampshire)

25 June 1996
(scorecard)

Leicestershire; 406/5 (60 overs)	v	Berkshire; 300/6 (60 overs)
Vince Wells 201; Jonathan Govett 3/103 (12 overs)		Harry Hall 108; Darren Maddy 2/56 (7 overs)

Leicestershire won by 106 runs
Grace Road, Leicester
Umpires: Trevor Jesty & David Shepherd
Player of the match: Vince Wells (Leicestershire)

25 June 1996
(scorecard)

Gloucestershire; 222 all out (59.5 overs)	v	Lincolnshire; 135 all out (47.3 overs)
Andrew Symonds 87; Neil Gill 4/44 (11.5 overs)		Mark Fell 31; Mike Smith 3/21 (6 overs)

Gloucestershire won by 87 runs
London Road, Sleaford
Umpires: Pasty Harris & Alan Whitehead
Player of the match: Andrew Symonds (Gloucestershire)

25 June 1996
(scorecard)

Cheshire; 135 all out (50.3 overs)	v	Northamptonshire; 193/1 (35 overs)
Richard Hignett 52; John Emburey 3/14 (8.3 overs)		Richard Montgomerie 69*; Nigel Peel 1/37 (7 overs)

Northamptonshire won by 9 wickets
County Ground, Northampton
Umpires: Paul Adams & Ray Julian
Player of the match: Richard Hignett (Cheshire)

25 June 1996
(scorecard)

Lancashire; 310/6 (60 overs)	v	Oxfordshire; 201/6 (60 overs)
Nick Speak 83; Bruce Ellison 3/53 (12 overs)		Charles Knightley 61*; Ian Austin 2/24 (7 overs)

Lancashire won by 109 runs
Butt's Way, Aston Rowant
Umpires: Tony Clarkson & Terry Spencer
Player of the match: Mike Atherton (Lancashire)

25 June 1996
(scorecard)

Somerset; 333/8 (60 overs)	v	Suffolk; 271/6 (60 overs)
Shane Lee 104; Craig Miller 2/61 (12 overs)		Philip Caley 88*; Andy Caddick 2/46 (12 overs)

Somerset won by 62 runs
County Ground, Taunton
Umpires: John Hampshire & John Steele
Player of the match: Shane Lee (Somerset)

25 June 1996
(scorecard)

Staffordshire; 178 all out (55.2 overs)	v	Derbyshire; 180/2 (26.5 overs)
Peter Ridgway 47*; Phil DeFreitas 3/31 (12 overs)		Chris Adams 68*; Denton Brock 1/33 (6 overs)

Derbyshire won by 8 wickets
Lichfield Road, Stone
Umpires: Barry Dudleston & Kevin Lyons
Player of the match: Phil DeFreitas (Derbyshire)

25 June 1996
(scorecard)

Surrey; 346 all out (60 overs)	v	Netherlands; 187 all out (42.4 overs)
Ali Brown 72; Steven van Dijk 4/57 (8 overs)		Zulfiqar Ahmed 27; Brendon Julian 3/48 (9.4 overs)

Surrey won by 159 runs
The Oval, London
Umpires: Chris Balderstone & Bob White
Player of the match: Steven van Dijk (Netherlands)

25 June 1996
(scorecard)

Yorkshire; 345/5 (60 overs)	v	Nottinghamshire; 140 all out (43.3 overs)
Martyn Moxon 137; Kevin Evans 2/57 (12 overs)		Tim Robinson 35; Richard Stemp 4/45 (12 overs)

Yorkshire won by 205 runs
Headingley, Leeds
Umpires: Graham Burgess & John Holder
Player of the match: Martyn Moxon (Yorkshire)

25, 26 June 1996
(scorecard)

Sussex; 384/9 (60 overs)	v	Ireland; 80 all out (33.3 overs)
Alan Wells 113; Derek Heasley 4/66 (11 overs)		Kyle McCallan 17; Paul Jarvis 3/22 (8 overs)

Sussex won by 304 runs
Ormeau Cricket Ground, Belfast
Umpires: Jeremy Lloyds & Nigel Plews
Player of the match: Alan Wells (Sussex)

- Match was scheduled for one day but extended to two.

=== Second round ===
10 July 1996
(scorecard)

Kent; 251/8 (60 overs)	v	Derbyshire; 254/8 (59.2 overs)
Matthew Walker 51; Colin Wells 3/41 (12 overs)		Dominic Cork 61; Martin McCague 3/49 (12 overs)

Derbyshire won by 2 wickets
County Ground, Derby
Umpires: Dickie Bird & Vanburn Holder
Player of the match: Phil DeFreitas (Derbyshire)

10 July 1996
(scorecard)

Essex; 361/7 (60 overs)	v	Durham; 294 all out (56.3 overs)
Ronnie Irani 124 (99); Simon Brown 2/49 (12 overs)		Mike Roseberry 100 (105); Peter Such 3/56 (12 overs)

Essex won by 67 runs
County Ground, Chelmsford
Umpires: John Harris & Peter Willey
Player of the match: Stuart Law (Essex)

10 July 1996
(scorecard)

Northamptonshire; 223 all out (59.2 overs)	v	Lancashire; 225/9 (58.4 overs)
Tony Penberthy 79; Peter Martin 4/36 (12 overs)		Graham Lloyd 41; John Emburey 3/38 (12 overs)

Lancashire won by 1 wicket
Old Trafford, Manchester
Umpires: Chris Balderstone & David Constant
Player of the match: Peter Martin (Lancashire)

10 July 1996
(scorecard)

Sussex; 220 all out (57.4 overs)	v	Leicestershire; 188 all out (57 overs)
Neil Lenham 36; Matthew Brimson 3/34 (10.4 overs)		James Whitaker 54; Jason Lewry 3/45 (12 overs)

Sussex won by 32 runs
Grace Road, Leicester
Umpires: Jack Bond & Roy Palmer
Player of the match: Ian Salisbury (Sussex)

10 July 1996
(scorecard)

Gloucestershire; 118 all out (32.4 overs)	v	Somerset; 122/5 (32.2 overs)
Robert Cunliffe 37; Andy Caddick 4/39 (9.4 overs)		Simon Ecclestone 37; Jon Lewis 3/27 (7.2 overs)

Somerset won by 5 wickets
County Ground, Taunton
Umpires: Tony Clarkson & Allan Jones
Player of the match: Harvey Trump (Somerset)

10 July 1996
(scorecard)

Surrey; 291/7 (60 overs)	v	Warwickshire; 203 all out (51.3 overs)
Graham Thorpe 96; Shaun Pollock 4/37 (12 overs)		Nick Knight 68; Chris Lewis 3/33 (10 overs)

Surrey won by 88 runs
Edgbaston, Birmingham
Umpires: Graham Burgess & Kevin Lyons
Player of the match: Graham Thorpe (Surrey)

10 July 1996
(scorecard)

Hampshire; 328/6 (60 overs)	v	Worcestershire; 203 all out (52.4 overs)
Robin Smith 158; Stuart Lampitt 3/56 (12 overs)		Tom Moody 44; Kevan James 4/42 (12 overs)

Hampshire won by 125 runs
New Road, Worcester
Umpires: John Hampshire & Ken Palmer
Player of the match: Robin Smith (Hampshire)

10 July 1996
(scorecard)

Middlesex; 199/9 (60 overs)	v	Yorkshire; 200/3 (44 overs)
Paul Weekes 104; Chris Silverwood 3/45 (12 overs)		David Byas 73*; Ricky Fay 1/20 (5 overs)

Yorkshire won by 7 runs
Headingley, Leeds
Umpires: Barry Dudleston & Trevor Jesty
Player of the match: Paul Weekes (Middlesex)

=== Quarter-finals ===
30 July 1996
(scorecard)

Essex; 286 all out (59.2 overs)	v	Hampshire; 186 all out (48.3 overs)
Stuart Law 107; Paul Whitaker 3/48 (9 overs)		Winston Benjamin 41; Paul Grayson 3/31 (10.3 overs)

Essex won by 100 runs
County Ground, Southampton
Umpires: John Harris & Mervyn Kitchen
Player of the match: Stuart Law (Essex)

30 July 1996
(scorecard)

Lancashire; 289/9 (60 overs)	v	Derbyshire; 287/9 (60 overs)
Mike Atherton 115; Kim Barnett 5/32 (6 overs)		Dean Jones 100*; Gary Yates 2/42 (12 overs)

Lancashire won by 2 runs
Old Trafford, Manchester
Umpires: George Sharp & Bob White
Player of the match: Mike Atherton (Lancashire)

30, 31 July 1996
(scorecard)

Somerset; 225 all out (59.1 overs)	v	Surrey; 226/5 (52.5 overs)
Peter Bowler 52; Brendon Julian 4/46 (11.1 overs)		Mark Butcher 91; Andy Caddick 3/34 (12 overs)

Surrey won by 5 wickets
The Oval, London
Umpires: Dickie Bird & Barrie Leadbeater
Player of the match: Mark Butcher (Surrey)

- Match was scheduled for one day but extended to two.

30 July 1996
(scorecard)

Sussex; 212/9 (60 overs)	v	Yorkshire; 215/5 (47.3 overs)
Bill Athey 54; Darren Gough 2/34 (12 overs)		Martyn Moxon 76; Vasbert Drakes 2/48 (8.3 overs)

Yorkshire won by 5 wickets
County Ground, Hove
Umpires: John Holder & Alan Whitehead
Player of the match: Darren Gough (Yorkshire)

=== Semi-finals ===
13 August 1996
(scorecard)

Lancashire; 293/9 (60 overs)	v	Yorkshire; 274/8 (60 overs)
Graham Lloyd 81; Darren Gough 3/47 (12 overs)		Michael Bevan 85; Ian Austin 3/47 (12 overs)

Lancashire won by 19 runs
Old Trafford, Manchester
Umpires: Ray Julian & Nigel Plews
Player of the match: Darren Gough (Yorkshire)

13 August 1996
(scorecard)

Surrey; 275/5 (60 overs)	v	Essex; 278/6 (56.4 overs)
Alec Stewart 125*; Paul Grayson 2/47 (8 overs)		Stuart Law 53; Brendon Julian 2/41 (7 overs)

Essex won by 4 wickets
The Oval, London
Umpires: Barrie Meyer & Roy Palmer
Player of the match: Alec Stewart (Surrey)

=== Final ===
7 September 1996
(scorecard)

Lancashire; 186 all out (60 overs)	v	Essex; 57 all out (27.2 overs)
John Crawley 66; Paul Grayson 3/24 (4.2 overs)		Neil Williams 11*; Glen Chapple 6/18 (6.2 overs)

Lancashire won by 129 runs
Lord's, London
Umpires: David Shepherd & Peter Willey
Player of the match: Glen Chapple (Lancashire)
