= 1995 NatWest Trophy =

- Administrator: Test and County Cricket Board
- Cricket format: Limited overs cricket (60 overs per innings)
- Tournament format: Knockout
- Champions: Warwickshire (5th title)
- Participants: 32
- Matches: 30
- Most runs: 310 Alan Fordham (Northamptonshire)
- Most wickets: 11 Anil Kumble (Northamptonshire); 11 Allan Donald (Warwickshire)

The 1995 NatWest Trophy was the 15th NatWest Trophy. It was an English limited overs county cricket tournament which was held between 27 June and 2 September 1995. The tournament was won by Warwickshire County Cricket Club who defeated Northamptonshire County Cricket Club by 4 wickets in the final at Lord's.

== Format ==
The 18 first-class counties, were joined by eleven Minor Counties: Berkshire, Cambridgeshire, Cheshire, Cornwall, Cumberland, Devon, Dorset, Herefordshire, Norfolk, Staffordshire and Suffolk. The Ireland national cricket team and the Scotland national cricket team also participated. A place in the tournament reserved for a Minor County was given to the Netherlands national cricket team, who took part in the competition for the first time. Teams who won in the first round progressed to the second round. The winners in the second round then progressed to the quarter-final stage. Winners from the quarter-finals then progressed to the semi-finals from which the winners then went on to the final at Lord's which was held on 2 September 1995.

=== First round ===
27 June 1995
(scorecard)

Derbyshire; 289/3 (60 overs)	v	Cambridgeshire; 132 all out (49.2 overs)
Daryll Cullinan 119*; Dominic Ralfs 1/45 (12 overs)		Bradleigh Donelan 32; Phil DeFreitas 5/28 (12 overs)

Derbyshire won by 157 runs
The Avenue Sports Club Ground, March
Umpires: Chris Balderstone & John Hampshire
Player of the match: Daryll Cullinan (Derbyshire)

27 June 1995
(scorecard)

Essex; 265/8 (60 overs)	v	Cheshire; 201 all out (57.4 overs)
Paul Prichard 81; Tony Murphy 4/48 (12 overs)		Richard Hignett 55; Graham Gooch 5/8 (2.4 overs)

Essex won by 64 runs
Boughton Hall Cricket Club Ground, Cheshire
Umpires: John Holder & Vanburn Holder
Player of the match: Paul Prichard (Essex)

27 June 1995
(scorecard)

Middlesex; 304/8 (60 overs)	v	Cornwall; 200 all out (59.2 overs)
Paul Weekes 143*; Jonathan Kent 2/41 (12 overs)		Stephen Williams 48; John Emburey 3/18 (10.2 overs)

Middlesex won by 104 runs
Wheal Eliza, St Austell
Umpires: John Harris & Michael Johnson
Player of the match: Paul Weekes (Middlesex)

27 June 1995
(scorecard)

Durham; 326/4 (60 overs)	v	Herefordshire; 119 all out (45.4 overs)
Stewart Hutton 125 (156); Kevin Jarvis 2/45 (11 overs)		Stuart Bevins 26 (48); James Boiling 4/22 (9.4 overs)

Durham won by 207 runs
Riverside Ground, Chester-le-Street
Umpires: Tony Clarkson & Nigel Plews
Player of the match: Mike Roseberry (Durham)

27 June 1995
(scorecard)

Dorset; 191/4 (60 overs)	v	Glamorgan; 192/0 (40.5 overs)
Jon Hardy 90*; Tony Cottey 1/11 (4 overs)		Hugh Morris 105*

Glamorgan won by 10 wickets
Sophia Gardens, Cardiff
Umpires: Derek Dennis & Bob White
Player of the match: Hugh Morris (Glamorgan)

27 June 1995
(scorecard)

Gloucestershire; 301/5 (60 overs)	v	Suffolk; 177 all out (58.4 overs)
Tony Wright 142; Darrell Carter 3/31 (12 overs)		Michael Peck 49; David Boden 6/26 (12 overs)

Gloucestershire won by 124 runs
The Royal & Sun Alliance County Ground, Bristol
Umpires: David Halfyard & Mervyn Kitchen
Player of the match: Tony Wright (Gloucestershire)

27 June 1995
(scorecard)

Norfolk; 188 all out (59.2 overs)	v	Lancashire; 190/2 (40.4 overs)
Steve Goldsmith 47; Mike Watkinson 3/41 (11 overs)		Jason Gallian 101*; Rodney Bunting 1/18 (6 overs)

Lancashire won by 8 wickets
Old Trafford, Manchester
Umpires: Pasty Harris & Barrie Leadbeater
Player of the match: Jason Gallian (Lancashire)

27 June 1995
(scorecard)

Hampshire; 202/9 (60 overs)	v	Leicestershire; 204/9 (60 overs)
Robin Smith 45; Adrian Pierson 3/36 (12 overs)		Phil Robinson 40; Cardigan Connor 4/41 (12 overs)

Leicestershire won by 1 wicket
Grace Road, Leicester
Umpires: Kevin Lyons & George Sharp
Player of the match: Adrian Pierson (Leicestershire)

27 June 1995
(scorecard)

Netherlands; 267/9 (60 overs)	v	Northamptonshire; 269/3 (56.5 overs)
Nolan Clarke 86; Anil Kumble 4/50 (12 overs)		Alan Fordham 99; Steven Lubbers 2/58 (12 overs)

Northamptonshire won by 7 wickets
County Ground, Northampton
Umpires: Jack Bond & Alan Whitehead
Player of the match: Nolan Clarke (Netherlands)

27 June 1995
(scorecard)

Scotland; 171/9 (60 overs)	v	Nottinghamshire; 172/2 (36.3 overs)
Alastair Storie 56; Andrew Pick 5/23 (11 overs)		Paul Pollard 83*; James Govan 1/24 (7 overs)

Nottinghamshire won by 8 wickets
Trent Bridge, Nottingham
Umpires: Ken Palmer & Peter Wight
Player of the match: Andrew Pick (Nottinghamshire)

27 June 1995
(scorecard)

Kent; 349/8 (60 overs)	v	Staffordshire; 258/6 (60 overs)
Neil Taylor 86; Peter Ridgway 2/62 (12 overs)		Laurie Potter 105*; Mark Ealham 2/17 (5 overs)

Kent won by 91 runs
Lichfield Road, Stone
Umpires: Paul Adams & Roy Palmer
Player of the match: Laurie Potter (Staffordshire)

27 June 1995
(scorecard)

Berkshire; 148 all out (51.1 overs)	v	Surrey; 151/1 (24.2 overs)
Robert Horner 32; Joey Benjamin 4/20 (12 overs)		Mark Butcher 79*; Philip Oxley 1/22 (5 overs)

Surrey won by 9 wickets
The Oval, London
Umpires: Ray Julian & Martin Reed
Player of the match: Joey Benjamin (Surrey)

27 June 1995
(scorecard)

Devon; 267/4 (60 overs)	v	Sussex; 271/3 (55.2 overs)
Nick Folland 104; Jason Lewry 3/63 (12 overs)		Neil Lenham 129*; Julian Wyatt 1/25 (4 overs)

Sussex won by 7 wickets
County Ground, Hove
Umpires: David Constant & Barry Dudleston
Player of the match: Neil Lenham (Sussex)

27 June 1995
(scorecard)

Warwickshire; 357/3 (60 overs)	v	Somerset; 339/9 (60 overs)
Nick Knight 151; Jason Kerr 2/74 (11 overs)		Richard Harden 104; Dermot Reeve 4/54 (12 overs)

Warwickshire won by 18 runs
Edgbaston, Birmingham
Umpires: Trevor Jesty & Peter Willey
Player of the match: Nick Knight (Warwickshire)

27 June 1995
(scorecard)

Worcestershire; 257/8 (60 overs)	v	Cumberland; 192/9 (60 overs)
Gavin Haynes 116*; David Makinson 2/44 (11 overs)		Paul Berry 81; Graeme Hick 2/15 (6 overs)

Worcestershire won by 65 runs
New Road, Worcester
Umpires: Allan Jones & Barrie Meyer
Player of the match: Gavin Haynes (Worcestershire)

27 June 1995
(scorecard)

Yorkshire; 299/6 (60 overs)	v	Ireland; 228/7 (60 overs)
Craig White 113; Mark Patterson 3/66 (12 overs)		Stephen Warke 82; Craig White 3/38 (12 overs)

Yorkshire won by 71 runs
Headingley, Leeds
Umpires: Dickie Bird & Terry Spencer
Player of the match: Simon Kellett (Yorkshire)

=== Second round ===
12 July 1995
(scorecard)

Gloucestershire; 276/6 (60 overs)	v	Durham; 117 all out (42 overs)
Tony Wright 84 (172); Simon Brown 3/64 (12 overs)		Darren Blenkiron 29 (65); Kevin Cooper 3/15 (8 overs)

Gloucestershire won by 159 runs
Riverside Ground, Chester-le-Street
Umpires: Kevin Lyons & George Sharp
Player of the match: Tony Wright (Gloucestershire)

12 July 1995
(scorecard)

Yorkshire; 307/3 (60 overs)	v	Essex; 210 all out (48.2 overs)
Simon Kellett 92; Peter Such 1/36 (12 overs)		Darren Robinson 55; Craig White 2/24 (8 overs)

Yorkshire won by 97 runs
County Ground, Chelmsford
Umpires: Graham Burgess & Ken Palmer
Player of the match: Michael Bevan (Yorkshire)

12 July 1995
(scorecard)

Worcestershire; 271/6 (60 overs)	v	Lancashire; 275/6 (59 overs)
Tim Curtis 106*; Wasim Akram 1/45 (12 overs)		Stephen Titchard 92; Phil Newport 2/53 (12 overs)

Lancashire won by 4 wickets
Old Trafford, Manchester
Umpires: John Harris & David Shepherd
Player of the match: Tim Curtis (Worcestershire)

12 July 1995
(scorecard)

Leicestershire; 197/7 (60 overs)	v	Glamorgan; 198/4 (54.2 overs)
Iain Sutcliffe 68; Adrian Dale 2/28 (9 overs)		David Hemp 78; Alan Mullally 2/27 (9 overs)

Glamorgan won by 6 wickets
Grace Road, Leicester
Umpires: David Constant & Roy Palmer
Player of the match: David Hemp (Glamorgan)

12 July 1995
(scorecard)

Northamptonshire; 352/8 (60 overs)	v	Nottinghamshire; 314/8 (60 overs)
Alan Fordham 132; Chris Cairns 2/41 (12 overs)		Paul Pollard 96; Rob Bailey 2/42 (10 overs)

Northamptonshire won by 38 runs
Trent Bridge, Nottingham
Umpires: Dickie Bird & Barrie Leadbeater
Player of the match: Rob Bailey (Nottinghamshire)

12 July 1995
(scorecard)

Middlesex; 304/7 (60 overs)	v	Surrey; 225 all out (55.5 overs)
Toby Radford 82; Adam Hollioake 4/53 (12 overs)		Darren Bicknell 77; Richard Johnson 3/41 (12 overs)

Middlesex won by 79 runs
The Oval, London
Umpires: Barrie Meyer & Peter Wight
Player of the match: John Emburey (Middlesex)

12 July 1995
(scorecard)

Sussex; 222/8 (60 overs)	v	Derbyshire; 225/2 (53.5 overs)
Jamie Hall 70; Dominic Cork 4/50 (11 overs)		Chris Adams 109*; Franklyn Stephenson 1/48 (10 overs)

Derbyshire won by 8 wickets
County Ground, Hove
Umpires: Vanburn Holder & Alan Whitehead
Player of the match: Chris Adams (Derbyshire)

12 July 1995
(scorecard)

Warwickshire; 262/7 (60 overs)	v	Kent; 252/9 (60 overs)
Roger Twose 93*; Martin McCague 2/42 (10 overs)		Trevor Ward 68; Dermot Reeve 3/41 (12 overs)

Warwickshire won by 10 runs
Edgbaston, Birmingham
Umpires: John Holder & Alan Whitehead
Player of the match: Roger Twose (Warwickshire)

=== Quarter-finals ===
1 August 1995
(scorecard)

Warwickshire; 290/6 (60 overs)	v	Derbyshire; 174 all out (46.5 overs)
Dougie Brown 58; Devon Malcolm 2/53 (12 overs)		Kim Barnett 53; Allan Donald 5/41 (10.5 overs)

Warwickshire won by 116 runs
County Ground, Derby
Umpires: Jack Bond & Graham Burgess
Player of the match: Tim Munton (Warwickshire)

1 August 1995
(scorecard)

Glamorgan; 242/9 (60 overs)	v	Middlesex; 176 all out (51.5 overs)
Steve James 56; Richard Johnson 3/33 (9 overs)		John Carr 62; Hamish Anthony 4/25 (9.5 overs)

Glamorgan won by 66 runs
Sophia Gardens, Cardiff
Umpires: Trevor Jesty & Ray Julian
Player of the match: Colin Metson (Glamorgan)

1 August 1995
(scorecard)

Northamptonshire; 226 all out (58.2 overs)	v	Gloucestershire; 202 all out (57.4 overs)
Rob Bailey 52; Javagal Srinath 4/38 (11.2 overs)		Andrew Symonds 48; Paul Taylor 4/34 (9.4 overs)

Northamptonshire won by 24 runs
The Royal & Sun Alliance County Ground, Bristol
Umpires: Allan Jones & Nigel Plews
Player of the match: Rob Bailey (Northamptonshire)

1 August 1995
(scorecard)

Lancashire; 169 all out (53.3 overs)	v	Yorkshire; 170/8 (59.3 overs)
Mike Watkinson 55; Mark Robinson 3/21 (10.3 overs)		Michael Bevan 60*; Ian Austin 3/32 (12 overs)

Yorkshire won by 2 wickets
Headingley, Leeds
Umpires: Barry Dudleston & David Shepherd
Player of the match: Michael Bevan (Yorkshire)

=== Semi-finals ===
15 August 1995
(scorecard)

Glamorgan; 86 all out (47 overs)	v	Warwickshire; 88/2 (24.1 overs)
David Hemp 28; Ashley Giles 3/14 (11 overs)		Neil Smith 32; Steve Barwick 2/15 (8.1 overs)

Warwickshire won by 8 wickets
Sophia Gardens, Cardiff
Umpires: Roy Palmer & Alan Whitehead
Player of the match: Tim Munton (Warwickshire)

15 August 1995
(scorecard)

Northamptonshire; 286/5 (60 overs)	v	Yorkshire; 199 all out (54.3 overs)
Rob Bailey 93*; Peter Hartley 1/37 (12 overs)		Richard Blakey 39; Anil Kumble 3/41 (11.3 overs)

Northamptonshire won by 87 runs
Headingley, Leeds
Umpires: Chris Balderstone & John Hampshire
Player of the match: Rob Bailey (Northamptonshire)

=== Final ===
2, 3 September 1995
(scorecard)

Northamptonshire; 200 all out (59.5 overs)	v	Warwickshire; 203/6 (58.5 overs)
Rob Bailey 44; Allan Donald 3/33 (12 overs)		Roger Twose 68; Paul Taylor 2/37 (11.5 overs)

Warwickshire won by 4 wickets
Lord's, London
Umpires: Dickie Bird & Mervyn Kitchen
Player of the match: Dermot Reeve (Warwickshire)

- Match was scheduled for one day but extended to two.
