= 2000 Benson & Hedges Cup =

- Administrator: England and Wales Cricket Board
- Cricket format: List A (50 overs per innings)
- Champions: Gloucestershire (3rd title)
- Participants: 18
- Matches: 52
- Most runs: 319 Matthew Maynard (Glamorgan)
- Most wickets: 14 James Averis (Gloucestershire)

The 2000 Benson & Hedges Cup was the twenty-ninth edition of cricket's Benson & Hedges Cup. The competition was won by Gloucestershire County Cricket Club, who defeated Glamorgan County Cricket Club in the final at Lord's on 10 June.

== Midlands/West/Wales Group ==
Team	Pld	W	L	NR	A	Pts	NRR
Glamorgan	5	2	1	0	2	6	-0.438
Gloucestershire	5	2	1	1	1	6	1.036
Warwickshire	5	1	1	1	2	5	-1.791
Northamptonshire	5	1	1	0	3	5	-0.356
Worcestershire	5	1	1	1	2	4	2.031
Somerset	5	0	2	1	2	3	-2.205

== North Group ==
Team	Pld	W	L	NR	A	Pts	NRR
Yorkshire	5	3	1	1	0	7	0.315
Lancashire	5	3	2	0	0	6	0.070
Durham	5	3	2	0	0	6	0.649
Derbyshire	5	2	1	2	0	6	0.118
Leicestershire	5	1	2	1	1	4	-0.043
Nottinghamshire	5	0	4	0	1	1	-1.480

== South Group ==
Team	Pld	W	L	NR	A	Pts	NRR
Sussex	5	2	1	0	2	6	0.282
Hampshire	5	2	1	0	2	6	0.062
Surrey	5	1	1	0	3	5	1.100
Kent	5	1	1	0	3	5	-0.843
Essex	5	1	2	0	2	4	-0.530
Middlesex	5	0	1	0	4	4	-1.540

=== Quarter-finals ===
9 May 2000
(scorecard)

Glamorgan; 182/6 (50 overs)	v	Hampshire; 69 all out (34.2 overs)
Adrian Dale 63* (90); Peter Hartley 2/22 (10 overs)		Shaun Udal 15 (36); Owen Parkin 3/16 (8 overs)

Glamorgan won by 113 runs
Sophia Gardens, Cardiff
Umpires: Graham Burgess & Neil Mallender
Player of the match: Adrian Dale (Glamorgan)

9 May 2000
(scorecard)

Durham; 154 all out (46.5 overs)	v	Lancashire; 158/7 (45 overs)
Simon Katich 62 (113); Chris Schofield 4/34 (10 overs)		Neil Fairbrother 57* (117); John Wood 4/26 (10 overs)

Lancashire won by 3 wickets
Old Trafford, Manchester
Umpires: John Hampshire & Trevor Jesty
Player of the match: Neil Fairbrother (Lancashire)

9 May 2000
(scorecard)

Gloucestershire; 237/7 (50 overs)	v	Sussex; 208/9 (50 overs)
Ian Harvey 88 (68); Robin Martin-Jenkins 2/24 (10 overs)		Michael Bevan 71 (85); Ian Harvey 3/28 (10 overs)

Gloucestershire won by 29 runs
County Ground, Hove
Umpires: Nigel Cowley & Pasty Harris
Player of the match: Ian Harvey (Gloucestershire)

9 May 2000
(scorecard)

Surrey; 198/6 (50 overs)	v	Yorkshire; 191 all out (49.5 overs)
Alec Stewart 97* (142); Matthew Hoggard 4/39 (10 overs)		Matthew Wood 59 (109); Adam Hollioake 2/30 (10 overs)

Surrey won by 7 runs
Headingley, Leeds
Umpires: Tony Clarkson & John Harris
Player of the match: Alec Stewart (Surrey)

=== Semi-finals ===
27, 28 May 2000
(scorecard)

Glamorgan; 251 all out (49.1 overs)	v	Surrey; 212 all out (43 overs)
Matthew Maynard 109 (115); Adam Hollioake 3/36 (7 overs)		Alec Stewart 85 (111); Owen Parkin 4/60 (8 overs)

Glamorgan won by 32 runs (D/L method)
Sophia Gardens, Cardiff
Umpires: David Constant & Vanburn Holder
Player of the match: Matthew Maynard (Glamorgan)

- Match was scheduled for one day but extended to two. Surrey target was 245 runs in 46 overs.

28, 29 May 2000
(scorecard)

Gloucestershire; 220/6 (50 overs)	v	Lancashire; 205/9 (50 overs)
Robert Cunliffe 71 (113); Peter Martin 2/49 (9 overs)		Neil Fairbrother 74 (102); Mike Smith 4/27 (10 overs)

Gloucestershire won by 15 runs
County Ground, Bristol
Umpires: Barrie Leadbeater & Roy Palmer
Player of the match: Robert Cunliffe (Gloucestershire)

- Match was scheduled for one day but extended to two.

=== Final ===
10 June 2000
(scorecard)

Glamorgan; 225 all out (49.3 overs)	v	Gloucestershire; 226/3 (46.5 overs)
Matthew Maynard 104 (116); Ian Harvey 5/34 (9.3 overs)		Tim Hancock 60 (85); Robert Croft 1/39 (10 overs)

Gloucestershire won by 7 wickets
Lord's, London
Umpires: Ken Palmer & George Sharp
Player of the match: Matthew Maynard (Glamorgan)

== See also ==
- Benson & Hedges Cup
