= Mark Powell (cricketer, born 1972) =

English cricketer (born 1972)

Personal information
- Full name: Mark Geoffrey Powell
- Born: 5 August 1972 (age 54); Romford, London, England
- Nickname: Powelly
- Height: 6 ft 0 in (1.83 m)
- Batting: Right-handed
- Bowling: Slow left-arm orthodox
- Relatives: Jonathan Powell (brother)

Domestic team information
- Years: Team
- 1992: Essex CCC
- 1996: Minor Counties
- 1995–1996: Norfolk

Career statistics
Competition	List A
Matches	4
Runs scored	49
Batting average	12.25
100s/50s	–/–
Top score	37
Balls bowled	201
Wickets	1
Bowling average	171.00
5 wickets in innings	–
10 wickets in match	–
Best bowling	1/60
Catches/stumpings	1/–
- Source: Cricinfo, 25 October 2011

Mark Powell (born 5 August 1972) is a former English cricketer. Powell was an all-rounder, a slow left arm orthodox spinner and right-handed batsman. He was born in Romford, London.

Powell signed for Essex CCC in 1992 and played in the majority of the Rapid Cricketline Second Eleven Championship during the 1992 and 1993 seasons. Powell made his top score of 106 v Durham at Castle Park, Colchester in September 1993 and best bowling figures of 7–71 v Middlesex at Chelmsford in August 1993. Powell made his debut for Norfolk against Herefordshire. He played Minor counties cricket for Norfolk in 1995 and 1996, making seventeen Minor Counties Championship and two MCCA Knockout Trophy appearances. He made his List A debut for the county in the 1995 NatWest Trophy against Leicestershire. Two List A appearances followed for the Minor Counties in the 1996 Benson & Hedges Cup, before making a second and final appearance for Norfolk in that format against Hampshire in the 1996 NatWest Trophy. He met little success in his four List A matches, top scoring with 37 v Hampshire at Southampton with the bat, while taking just a single wicket with the ball, former England batsman J P Crawley against Lancashire at Old Trafford.

He left Norfolk at the end of the 1996 season, later playing three matches for the Essex Cricket Board in the 1998 MCCA Knockout Trophy. His brother, Jonathan, played first-class cricket for Essex.
