= 1997 English cricket season =

The 1997 cricket season was the 98th in which the County Championship has been an official competition. The season centred on the six-Test Ashes series against Australia. England won the first, at Edgbaston, by the decisive margin of nine wickets, and the rain-affected second Test at Lord's was drawn, but any English optimism was short-lived. Australia won the next three games by huge margins to secure the series and retain The Ashes, and England's three-day victory in the final game at The Oval was little more than a consolation prize. It was the 68th test series between the two teams with Australia finally winning 3-2 The three-match ODI series which preceded the Tests produced a statistical curiosity, with England winning each match by an identical margin, six wickets.

The Britannic Assurance County Championship went to Glamorgan for the first time since 1969, by a margin of just four points from Kent. The combination of captain Matthew Maynard and Steve James' batting along with Waqar Younis' and Steve Watkin's bowling propelled them to the title, although the matter was not settled until the final match of the season, when Glamorgan's maximum-points thrashing of Somerset at Taunton ensured that Kent's own victory over Surrey was irrelevant.

In one-day cricket, Warwickshire won the AXA Life League by two points from Kent, but were themselves thrashed by nine wickets by Essex in the final of the NatWest Trophy. The honours in the Benson & Hedges Cup went to Surrey, who beat Kent by eight wickets in the final.

Ali Brown's 203 for Surrey in the AXA Life League against Hampshire in July remains the only double century ever scored in a 40-over List A match.

== Honours ==
- County Championship - Glamorgan
- NatWest Trophy - Essex
- Sunday League - Warwickshire
- Benson & Hedges Cup - Surrey
- Minor Counties Championship - Devon
- MCCA Knockout Trophy - Norfolk
- Second XI Championship - Lancashire II
- Wisden - Matthew Elliott, Stuart Law, Glenn McGrath, Matthew Maynard, Graham Thorpe

== Statistical highlights ==
=== First-class ===
- Highest team total: 631/7 dec by Warwickshire v Hampshire at Southampton, 29–30 May
- Lowest team total: 31 by Glamorgan v Middlesex at Cardiff, 14 June
- Highest individual innings: 303* by Graeme Hick (Worcestershire) v Hampshire at Southampton, 18–19 September
- Most runs in season: 1,775 by Steve James (Glamorgan)
- Best innings bowling: 9–64 by Melvyn Betts (Durham) v Northamptonshire at Northampton, 28 August
- Most wickets in season: 83 by Mike Smith (Gloucestershire and England)

=== List A ===
- Highest team total: 371/6 (50 overs) by Leicestershire v Scotland at Leicester, 28 April
- Lowest team total: 53 by Ireland v Yorkshire at Leeds, 24 June
- Highest individual innings: 203 by Ali Brown (Surrey) v Hampshire at Guildford, 20 July
- Most runs in season: 1,088 by Stuart Law (Essex)
- Best innings bowling: 7–24 by Mushtaq Ahmed (Somerset) v Ireland at Taunton, 2 May
- Most wickets in season: 53 by Allan Donald (Warwickshire)

== Ashes tour ==
Cumulative record - Test wins	1876–1997
England	92
Australia	114
Drawn	85

== Averages ==
=== First-class ===
==== Batting ====
Qualification: eight innings

English first-class batting averages, 1997
Player	Team(s)	M	I	NO	Runs	HS	Ave	100	50
Graeme Hick	Worcestershire	18	28	6	1,524	303*	69.27	6	4
Steve James	Glamorgan	18	30	4	1,775	162	68.26	7	8
Matthew Maynard	Glamorgan	18	25	7	1,170	161*	65.00	3	7
Ricky Ponting	Australia	8	12	3	571	127	63.44	2	2
Darren Lehmann	Yorkshire	17	27	2	1,575	182	63.00	4	10
Neil Johnson	Leicestershire	12	18	5	819	150	63.00	2	5

==== Bowling ====
Qualification: ten wickets

English first-class bowling averages, 1997
Player	Team(s)	Balls	Mdns	Runs	Wkts	BB	Ave	5wI	10wM
Hamish Anthony	MCC	252	11	113	10	6-34	11.30	1	1
Allan Donald	Warwickshire	2,327	123	928	60	6-55	15.63	3	1
Mike Smith	England, Gloucestershire	3,074	125	1,464	83	6-45	17.63	5	3
Paul Reiffel	Australia	1,132	49	520	28	5-49	18.27	2	0
Kevan James	Hampshire	967	37	504	27	8-49	18.66	2	1
Saqlain Mushtaq	Surrey	1,529	75	617	32	5-17	19.28	4	2

=== List A ===
==== Batting ====
Qualification: eight innings

English List A batting averages, 1997
Player	Team(s)	M	I	NO	Runs	HS	Ave	100	50
Mike Roseberry	Durham	10	9	5	252	91*	63.00	0	2
Chris Adams	Derbyshire	19	19	3	988	138	61.75	5	3
Neil Fairbrother	Lancashire	20	20	7	792	88	60.92	0	9
Kim Barnett	Derbyshire	16	14	1	751	112*	57.76	2	3
Rob Bailey	Northamptonshire	23	22	5	859	153*	50.52	1	8
Matthew Hayden	Hampshire	23	22	1	920	120*	46.66	3	4

==== Bowling ====
Qualification: ten wickets

English List A bowling averages, 1997
Player	Team(s)	Balls	Mdns	Runs	Wkts	BB	Ave	5wI
Allan Donald	Warwickshire	1,116	21	718	53	5-10	13.54	3
Peter Martin	Lancashire	998	20	649	43	5-21	15.09	2
David Leatherdale	Worcestershire	663	5	512	32	5-10	16.00	1
Devon Malcolm	Derbyshire	378	6	262	16	7-35	16.37	1
Phil Newport	Worcestershire	606	13	370	22	4-37	16.81	0
Darren Gough	England, Yorkshire	1,061	12	752	41	7-27	18.34	2

== External sources ==
- CricketArchive – season and tournament itineraries
- England Domestic Season 1997 at Cricinfo

== Annual reviews ==
- Playfair Cricket Annual 1998
- Wisden Cricketers' Almanack 1998
