= Australian cricket team in England in 1997 =

International cricket tour

1997 Ashes series
- Date: 5 June 1997 – 25 August 1997
- Location: England
- Result: Australia won the six-Test series 3–2
- Player of the series: Glenn McGrath (Aus) and Graham Thorpe (Eng)
Teams
- England: Australia
Captains
- Michael Atherton: Mark Taylor
Most runs
- Graham Thorpe (453) Nasser Hussain (431) Alec Stewart (268): Matthew Elliott (556); Steve Waugh (390); Greg Blewett (381)
Most wickets
- Andy Caddick (24) Dean Headley (16) Darren Gough (16): Glenn McGrath (36); Shane Warne (24); Jason Gillespie (16)

The Australian cricket team toured England in the 1997 season to play a six-match Ashes Test series against England. Australia, under Mark Taylor, won the series 3–2 with strong batting performances from Matthew Elliott supporting the decisive bowling of Shane Warne, Glenn McGrath and Jason Gillespie.

England had enjoyed good form leading up to the series, with a 3–0 One Day International victory, and success in New Zealand; however, after winning convincingly in the first Test the host team struggled. Graham Thorpe and Nasser Hussain both scored over 400 runs for England, with Andy Caddick the leading wicket-taker.

This was the only Ashes series between 1987 and 2005 in which England won a match before Australia had already taken an unassailable lead in the series.

== Prelude ==
The previous series over the winter of 1994-95, hosted in Australia, saw the host nation win 3–1. Australia, however, entered the 1997 series with a number of injuries and poor form. Mark Taylor had also suffered what Wisden referred to as "personal purgatory", involving a pay dispute with the Australian Cricket Board. His captaincy was itself in question until April 1997. Matthew Elliott's selection and the reshuffle of Michael Bevan's position in the batting order also attracted media speculation.

England, in contrast, were enjoying strong form. Alec Stewart had been named player of the year, and experienced Michael Atherton reselected as captain. In the media, The Daily Telegraph heralded a "new England". John Crawley's surprise selection for the ODI series was seen as a wise decision by Christopher Martin-Jenkins, while Australia lost warm-up practice at Durham due to rain.

Australia were whitewashed during the ODI Texaco series. Australian cricketer Ian Chappell in particular voiced his concerns over Taylor's responsibility. England, on the other hand, gained a sense of optimism about the coming Test series. Qamar Ahmed, of The Daily Telegraph, wrote that "I have rarely seen Australia bowl so badly and field so poorly. They were guilty of exactly that in the last three matches and their batting with their out-of-form captain Mark Taylor makes them even a lot fractious than they should be with the abundance of talent that they have on tour." Christopher Martin-Jenkins echoed such sentiments, stating that England's "hopes of winning the Ashes are growing." Atherton himself wrote in the media of his pride regarding "England's young lions" during the ODI series.

Australia were not without their own confidence. Chappell highlighted the role of Shane Warne in the media, while England bowler Dean Headley was ruled out of the opening Test with an injury. Nick Knight and Phil Tufnell were both left out of the final eleven, and Dominic Cork also picked up an injury. Nevertheless, Australia entered the first Test under pressure.

== One Day Internationals (ODIs) ==
England won the Texaco Trophy 3–0.

=== 1st ODI ===
22 May 1997
Scorecard

Australia; 170/8 (50 overs)	v	England; 175/4 (40.1 overs)
Michael Bevan 30 (56); Mark Ealham 2/21 (8 overs)		Graham Thorpe 75* (108); Glenn McGrath 2/34 (10 overs)

England won by 6 wickets
Headingley Cricket Ground, Leeds
Umpires: Ray Julian and Peter Willey
Player of the match: Adam Hollioake (Eng)

- England won the toss and elected to field.

=== 2nd ODI ===
24 May 1997
Scorecard

Australia; 249/6 (50 overs)	v	England; 253/4 (48.2 overs)
Michael Bevan 108* (129); Adam Hollioake 1/25 (4 overs)		Michael Atherton 113* (149); Shane Warne 1/39 (10 overs)

England won by 6 wickets
The Oval, London
Umpires: John Hampshire and David Shepherd
Player of the match: Michael Atherton (Eng)

- England won the toss and elected to field.
- Ashley Giles (Eng) made his ODI debut.

=== 3rd ODI ===
25 May 1997
Scorecard

Australia; 269 (49.2 overs)	v	England; 270/4 (49 overs)
Mark Waugh 95 (96); Darren Gough 5/44 (10 overs)		Alec Stewart 79 (106); Mark Waugh 1/28 (6 overs)

England won by 6 wickets
Lord's, London
Umpires: Mervyn Kitchen and George Sharp
Player of the match: Darren Gough (Eng)

- England won the toss and elected to field.
- Ben Hollioake (Eng) and Matthew Elliott (Aus) made their ODI debuts.

== Test series summary ==
=== First Test ===
5–8 June
Scorecard

Australia	v	England
118 (31.5 overs); Shane Warne 47 (46); Andy Caddick 5/50 [11.5]		478/9d (138.4 overs); Nasser Hussain 207 (337); Michael Kasprowicz 4/113 [39]
477 (144.4 overs); Mark Taylor 129 (296); Darren Gough 3/123 [35]		119/1 (21.3 overs); Michael Atherton 57 (87); Michael Kasprowicz 1/42 [7]

England won by 9 wickets
Edgbaston, Birmingham
Umpires: Steve Bucknor (WI) and Peter Willey (Eng)
Player of the match: Nasser Hussain (Eng)

- Australia won the toss and elected to bat.
- Mark Butcher (Eng) made his Test debut.

The first Test saw 72,693 in attendance across its four days, bringing in £1,588,593 in revenue. Australia batted first after winning the toss, and rapidly collapsed to 54/8, before Warne and Michael Kasprowicz combined to bring Australia to 110 before the latter fell. Warne fell to Caddick three short of a half century, giving the England bowler a five-wicket haul, with Darren Gough and Devon Malcolm picking up three and two respectively. When England fell to 16/2, the pitch was initially blamed in the media, however Hussain and Thorpe scored a career-best 207 and 138 respectively in a 288-run partnership which became a record 4th-wicket partnership for England against Australia. Warne eventually dismissed Hussain, and Thorpe was removed by McGrath, however a late order career-best 53 not out from Mark Ealham saw England to 478 for nine declared.

Australia fared better in their second innings, reaching 477 all out thanks to "a heroic century" by Taylor – who scored 129 along with Greg Blewett who scored 125. Eliott scored 66, however no other Australian batsman passed 50. Three wickets were shared each between Gough, Robert Croft and Ealham, leaving England a target of 118 runs. Mark Butcher, on debut, was dismissed by Kasprowicz for 14, however Atherton reached 57 and Stewart reached 40 before hitting the winning runs. Stewart also passed 5,000 Test runs during his knock, and Wisden record that "Victory brought an outpouring of elation, in front of the pavilion and across the country; people suddenly felt the little urn could, indeed, be recaptured." Hussain received the Man of the Match award for his double century.

This was the only Ashes series between 1987 and 2005 in which England won a match before Australia had already taken an unassailable lead in the series.

=== Second Test ===
19–23 June
Scorecard

England	v	Australia
77 (42.3 overs); Graham Thorpe 21 (49); Glenn McGrath 8/38 [20.3]		213/7d (61 overs); Matthew Elliot 112 (180); Andy Caddick 4/71 [22]
266/4d (79 overs); Mark Butcher 87 (210); Shane Warne 2/47 [19]

Match drawn
Lord's, London
Umpires: David Shepherd (Eng) and Srinivasaraghavan Venkataraghavan (Ind)
Player of the match: Glenn McGrath (Aus)

- Australia won the toss and elected to field.
- No play was possible on Day 1 due to rain.
- Play on Day 2 was reduced to 21 overs due to rain.

The second Test match was affected by rain. Australia had last been defeated at Lord's in 1934, however the draw here ended a run of 18 consecutive results for the visiting team. England lost the toss and were put in to bat, on a difficult pitch, and were dismissed for 77 thanks to eight wickets from McGrath, his best haul in tests to date. It was the lowest England total at Lord's since 1888, and the third best performance with the ball by an Australian Test player. Only Hussain, Thorpe and Gough reached double figures, Thorpe top-scoring with 21. Paul Reiffel took the two other wickets, and Australia quickly surpassed the low target with only two wickets down. Thanks to a knock of 112 from Elliott, Australia declared at 213/7. Stewart had left the field for part of the innings due to back spasms, and Crawley had kept wicket.

England replied with a more solid 266 for four. Butcher and Atherton constructed the majority of the innings, with 87 and 77 respectively, and some quick scoring by Thorpe and Crawley – who both remained not out – allowed England to reach their score at 3.36 runs an over. The declaration came after Butcher fell, and the game had been safely batted out to a draw.

=== Third Test ===
3–7 July
Scorecard

Australia	v	England
235 (77.3 overs); Steve Waugh 108 (174); Dean Headley 4/72 [27.3]		162 (84.4 overs); Mark Butcher 51 (140); Shane Warne 6/48 [30]
395/8d (122 overs); Steve Waugh 116 (271); Dean Headley 4/104 (29)		200 (73.4 overs); John Crawley 83 (151); Glenn McGrath 4/46 [21]

Australia won by 268 runs
Old Trafford, Manchester
Umpires: George Sharp (Eng) and Srinivasaraghavan Venkataraghavan (Ind)
Player of the match: Steve Waugh (Aus)

- Australia won the toss and elected to bat.
- Dean Headley (Eng) made his Test debut.

England brought in Dean Headley for his debut in the Third Test, while for Australia Jason Gillespie replaced Kasprowicz. Australia, batting first having won the toss, reached 235 runs thanks largely to a century by Steve Waugh, while Headley took four wickets and Gough three. Headley bowled an intimidating spell – coming "straight into the action, striking Taylor on the helmet as he ducked into a bouncer in his opening over." Dropped catches, however, hampered England's bowling performance. Butcher hit 51 and Stewart 30 as England responded with 162, largely hemmed back by a six wicket haul from Warne, and three for McGrath. Butcher, dismissed by a stumping, provided Healy with his 100th dismissal in Ashes Tests.

Australia increased their lead with a second innings score of 395, thanks again to Steve Waugh's century, 116 runs on this occasion. His 14th century made him the first Australian batsman to score a hundred in both innings since 1989, and the first instance of this feat in a Test between Australia and England since Arthur Morris and Denis Compton in 1947. Australia left England 469 runs to win, and despite Crawley's knock of 83, England were dismissed for 200 runs, thanks to four wickets from McGrath and three for each of Warne and Gillespie. During the innings, Warne overtook Richie Benaud as the most successful Test leg-spin bowler, taking his 249th Test wicket. Australia levelled the series in front of a crowd which totalled 87,829 over the five days.

=== Fourth Test ===
24–28 July
Scorecard

England	v	Australia
172 (59.4 overs); Michael Atherton 41 (143); Jason Gillespie 7/37 [13.4]		501/9d (123 overs); Matthew Elliott 199 (351); Darren Gough 5/149 [36]
268 (91.1 overs); Nasser Hussain 105 (181); Paul Reiffel 5/80 [21.1]

Australia won by an innings and 61 runs
Headingley, Leeds
Umpires: Mervyn Kitchen (Eng) and Cyril Mitchley (SA)
Player of the match: Jason Gillespie (Aus)

- Australia won the toss and elected to field.
- Play on Day 1 reduced to 36 overs due to rain.
- Mike Smith (Eng) made his Test debut.

England announced the same team for the First Test, apart from Mike Smith who was brought in over Caddick, while Australia lodged a complaint against David Graveney for his alleged involvement in a decision to change pitches two weeks before the Test. Australia won the toss and chose to bowl in the 36 overs permitted in a rain-affected first day. Beginning the second day on 103/3, England collapsed to 172 all out, thanks to a seven-wicket haul from Gillespie. Atherton scored 41 from 143 deliveries, but no other batsman passed 30. In response, Elliott (199) and Ashes debutant Ricky Ponting's maiden Test century (127) brought Australia to 501/9 declared, with an expensive five-wicket haul for Gough, who went for 149 runs.

England attempted to regain control, however they struggled initially, falling to 89/4. A 123-run partnership between Hussain – his 105 being his second century of the series – and Crawley (72) gave England some hope, however five wickets for Reiffel dismissed England for 268. This innings and 61-run victory gave Australia a 2–1 lead with two matches remaining.

=== Fifth Test ===
7–10 August 1997
Scorecard

Australia	v	England
427 (121.5 overs); Mark Taylor 76 (155); Dean Headley 4/87 [30.5]		313 (93.5 overs); Alec Stewart 87 (107); Glenn McGrath 4/71 [29.5]
336 (98.5 overs); Ian Healy 63 (78); Andy Caddick 3/85 [20]		186 (48.5 overs); Graham Thorpe 82* (92); Glenn McGrath 3/36 [13.5]

Australia won by 264 runs
Trent Bridge, Nottingham
Umpires: Cyril Mitchley (SA) and David Shepherd (Eng)
Player of the match: Ian Healy (Aus)

- Australia won the toss and elected to bat.
- Adam Hollioake and Ben Hollioake (both Eng) made their Test debuts.

England brought Malcolm and Caddick back into the team for the 5th Test, as well as the two Hollioake brothers. There were also concerns in the England camp regarding Stewart's form, and Gough failed a fitness Test with an inflamed knee. Australia won the toss and batted, reaching 427 all out thanks to five half-centuries from the top five batsmen, while four wickets were taken by Headley and three by Malcolm. England fell to 313 all out in reply, thanks largely to Stewart's 87. Warne and McGrath took four wickets each to keep England behind the Australian total.

Healy and Ponting then led a quick-scoring attack, supported by a half-century from Blewett, to take Australia to 336 while wickets shared around the England bowlers, including three between the Hollioake brothers. Set 451 runs to win, England fell with a "strange mix of strokeless submission and devil-may-care defiance" to 186 all out, with Australia claiming an extra half-hour after stumps to defeat England on the 4th day. Only Thorpe with his 82 from 92 balls offered any resistance. Australia took an unassailable 3–1 lead, and pressure mounted on the England team and its management. The ECB had issued statements denying that Atherton had offered, or planned, to resign, and Wisden recorded: "[This] crushing defeat cost England the series and the Ashes but not, this time, their captain. Mike Atherton withstood all the demands that he follow the example of his predecessor, Graham Gooch, who had fallen on his sword in similar circumstances four years earlier. But the public debate about his future did nothing to ease the pressure on Atherton." Peter Johnson later records that "Atherton resolutely declined journalists' invitations to resign at once, though his wording suggested to many that he would answer differently when the series was over."

=== Sixth Test ===
21–23 August 1997
Scorecard

England	v	Australia
180 (56.4 overs); Alec Stewart 36 (73); Glenn McGrath 7/76 [21]		220 (79.3 overs); Greg Blewett 47 (132); Phil Tufnell 7/66 [34.3]
163 (66.5 overs); Graham Thorpe 62 (115); Michael Kasprowicz 7/36 [15.5]		104 (32.1 overs); Ricky Ponting 20 (35); Andy Caddick 5/42 [12]

England won by 19 runs
The Oval, London
Umpires: Lloyd Barker (WI) and Peter Willey (Eng)
Player of the match: Phil Tufnell (Eng)

- England won the toss and elected to bat.
- Shaun Young (Aus) played his only Test match.
