= Robert Horner =

Robert Horner may refer to:

- Robert Horner (politician) (1932–2008), Canadian politician
- Robert J. Horner (1894–1942), American film producer
- Robert Horner (cricketer) (born 1967), English cricketer

== See also ==
- Bob Horner (born 1957), American baseball player
