= Charles Knightley =

Charles Knightley may refer to:

- Charles Knightley (cricketer) (born 1972), English cricketer
- Sir Charles Knightley, 2nd Baronet (1781–1864), MP and baronet
- Charles Finch-Knightley, 11th Earl of Aylesford (1918–2008)
