= Peter Chadwick =

Peter Chadwick may refer to:

- Peter Chadwick (cricketer) (born 1934)
- Peter Chadwick (mathematician) (1931–2018)
