= Jonathan Powell (cricketer) =

English cricketer (born 1979)

Personal information
- Full name: Jonathan Christopher Powell
- Born: 13 June 1979 (age 47); Harold Wood, Greater London, England
- Batting: Right-handed
- Bowling: Right-arm off break
- Relatives: Mark Powell (brother)

Domestic team information
- Years: Team
- 2001: Surrey Cricket Board
- 1996–1999: Essex

Career statistics
Competition	First-class	List A
Matches	3	6
Runs scored	10	4
Batting average	10.00	2.00
100s/50s	–/–	–/–
Top score	6	2
Balls bowled	264	114
Wickets	1	4
Bowling average	137.00	31.25
5 wickets in innings	–	–
10 wickets in match	–	–
Best bowling	1/109	2/10
Catches/stumpings	2/–	1/–
- Source: Cricinfo, 25 October 2011

Jonathan Christopher Powell (born 13 June 1979) is a former English cricketer. Powell was a right-handed batsman who bowled right-arm off break. He was born at Harold Wood, Greater London.

Powell made his debut for Essex in a List A match against Sussex in the 1996 Axa Equity & Law League. Following the 1996 season, he made Youth Test match debut England Under-19s against Pakistan Under-19s. He would go on to make five Youth Test appearances and nine Youth One Day International appearances between 1996 and 1998. His first-class debut for Essex came in the 1997 County Championship against Leicestershire, in what would be his only County Championship appearance. A further first-class appearances followed in February 1998 when he was called into the England A teams tour of Kenya and Sri Lanka, despite having played just the one first-class match. He appeared once on the tour against Sri Lanka A. No first-class appearances came in the 1998 English cricket season, it was in 1999 what he played his second and final first-class match for Essex against Cambridge University.

His three first-class matches bought him little success with the ball, with Powell taking just a single first-class wicket (that of Leicestershire's David Millns). Having made his debut for Essex in the List A format of the game, he went on to make five further appearances in that format, all of which came in the 1997 AXA Life League. He had a little more success with the ball in this format, claiming 4 wickets in his 6 matches at an average of 31.25, with best figures of 2/10.

Eventually leaving Essex at the end of the 2000 season, Powell played a single match for the Surrey Cricket Board in the 2001 MCCA Knockout Trophy against Oxfordshire. His brother, Mark, played List A cricket for Norfolk and the Minor Counties.
