= Donelan =

Donelan is the surname of the following people:

- Donelan (cartoonist) (Gerard Donelan, born 1949), American cartoonist
- Anthony Donelan (1846–1934), Irish soldier and politician
- Bradleigh Donelan (born 1968), English cricketer
- Christopher Donelan (born 1964), American law enforcement officer and politician
- Joseph F. Donelan Jr. (1918–1999), United States Assistant Secretary of State
- Michelle Donelan (born 1984), British politician
