= Craig Millar =

Craig Millar may refer to:

- Craig Millar (ice hockey)
- Craig Millar (rugby union)

== See also ==
- Craig Miller (disambiguation)
- Craigmillar, an area of Edinburgh, Scotland
- Craigmillar, Alberta, a locality in Alberta, Canada
