= Craig Miller =

Craig Miller may refer to:

- Craig Miller (cricketer) (born 1971), English cricketer for Suffolk
- Craig A. Miller (born 1962), Australian professional tennis player
- Craig D. Miller (born 1963), American college and professional tennis player
- Craig Miller (water polo) (born 1971), Australian water polo player
- Craig Miller (runner) (born 1987), American runner
- Craig Miller (writer) (born 1954), American writer and film producer
- Craig Miller (broadcaster) (born 1965), American radio broadcaster
- Craig Miller (wrestler) (born 1985), New Zealand wrestler
- Craig Miller (American football) (born 1977), American football player

== See also ==
- Craig Millar (disambiguation)
