= Tony Clarkson =

Tony Clarkson may refer to:

- Tony Clarkson (cricketer)
- Tony Clarkson (footballer)
