= Michael Scothern =

English cricketer

Cricket information
- Batting: Right-handed
- Bowling: Right-arm fast-medium

Career statistics
Competition	First-class	List A
Matches	1	7
Runs scored	–	55
Batting average	–	13.75
100s/50s	–	0/0
Top score	–	23*
Balls bowled	96	458
Wickets	1	7
Bowling average	42.00	57.57
5 wickets in innings	0	0
10 wickets in match	0	0
Best bowling	1/42	3/29
Catches/stumpings	0/–	3/–
- Source: Cricinfo, 7 November 2022

Michael Graeme Scothern (born 9 March 1961) is a former English first-class cricketer who played one first-class match for Worcestershire in 1985, as well as making seven List A appearances for Cumberland and Minor Counties a few years later.

Born in Skipton, Yorkshire, Scothern played in Worcestershire's second team in 1984 and 1985, and in mid-June of the latter year made his first — and as it turned out, only — first-class appearance, against Cambridge University. Only 125 overs were possible in the match, and Scothern did not get to bat. With the ball he took his solitary first-class wicket when he had Cambridge captain Rob Andrew (who was to gain much greater fame in rugby union) lbw for 2.

Scothern was not retained at the end of 1985, and spent the rest of his career playing minor counties cricket for Cumberland. During this time he made several List A appearances, six for the county in the NatWest Trophy and one for the representative Minor Counties side in the Benson & Hedges Cup. His best performance came for Cumberland against Middlesex in the first round of the 1996 NatWest Trophy, when he claimed 3-29 from 11 overs.
