= 1996 English cricket season =

The 1996 English cricket season was the 97th in which the County Championship had been an official competition. England hosted tours by India and Pakistan, who each played three Tests and three ODIs. Against India, England were unbeaten, winning the Test series 1–0 and the ODI series 2–0. However, against the Pakistanis England lost 2–0 in the Tests, and had to console themselves with a 2–1 ODI series victory.

In Hampshire's game against the Indians just before the third Test, Hampshire's Kevan James took four wickets in consecutive balls and then scored a century. This was the first time this particular "double" had ever been achieved in a first-class match.

The County Championship was won by Leicestershire for the second time (after 1975), and they celebrated their already certain title by defeating Middlesex by an innings on the last day of the season. Leicestershire finished 27 points in front of Derbyshire.

In one-day cricket, the AXA Equity and Law League was won by Surrey on run rate from Nottinghamshire, while Lancashire claimed the honours in both the NatWest Trophy and the Benson & Hedges Cup. The best bowling figures of the season were claimed by Glen Chapple of Lancashire who took 6–18 in the NatWest Trophy final against Essex, in which the southern county were bowled out for an embarrassing 57.

Vince Wells' score of 201 in an earlier round of the NatWest Trophy was at the time only the fourth List A double century to have been scored.

== Honours ==
- County Championship – Leicestershire
- NatWest Trophy – Lancashire
- Sunday League – Surrey
- Benson & Hedges Cup – Lancashire
- Minor Counties Championship – Devon
- MCCA Knockout Trophy – Cheshire
- Second XI Championship – Warwickshire II
- Wisden – Sanath Jayasuriya, Mushtaq Ahmed, Saeed Anwar, Phil Simmons, Sachin Tendulkar

== Statistical highlights ==
First-class

- Highest team total: 686 by Lancashire v Essex at Chelmsford, 7–10 June
- Lowest team total: 67 by Durham v Middlesex at Cardiff, 14 June
- Highest individual innings: 275* by Matthew Walker (Kent) v Somerset at Canterbury, 15–16 August
- Most runs in season: 1,944 by Graham Gooch (Essex)
- Best innings bowling: 9–38 by Cardigan Connor (Hampshire) v Gloucestershire at Southampton, 8–9 August
- Most wickets in season: 85 by Courtney Walsh (Gloucestershire)

List A

- Highest team total: 406/5 (60 overs) by Leicestershire v Berkshire at Leicester, 25 June
- Lowest team total: 48 by Leicestershire v Surrey at The Oval, 16 June
- Highest individual innings: 201 by Vince Wells (Leicestershire) v Berkshire at Leicester, 25 June
- Most runs in season: 1,151 by Dean Jones (Derbyshire)
- Best innings bowling: 6–18 by Glen Chapple (Lancashire) v Essex at Lord's, 7 September
- Most wickets in season: 56 by Adam Hollioake (Surrey)

== Averages ==
=== First-class ===
Batting Qualification: eight innings

English first-class batting averages, 1996
Player	Team(s)	M	I	NO	Runs	HS	Ave	100	50
Sourav Ganguly	India	9	14	6	762	136	95.25	3	4
Saeed Anwar	Pakistan	10	19	1	1,224	219*	68.00	5	4
Graham Gooch	Essex	17	30	1	1,994	201	67.03	8	6
Herschelle Gibbs	South Africa A	8	14	1	867	183	66.69	2	5
Adam Hollioake	Surrey	17	29	6	1,522	129	66.17	5	8
Inzamam-ul-Haq	Pakistan	9	14	2	792	169*	66.00	3	4

Bowling Qualification: ten wickets

English first-class bowling averages, 1996
Player	Team(s)	Balls	Mdns	Runs	Wkts	BB	Ave	5wI	10wM
Shahid Nazir	Pakistan	282	8	164	12	4–43	13.66	0	0
Saqlain Mushtaq	Pakistan	1,001	43	456	29	6–52	15.72	2	0
Curtly Ambrose	Northamptonshire	1,708	80	717	43	6–26	16.67	5	1
Courtney Walsh	Gloucestershire	3,159	142	1,432	85	6–22	16.84	7	1
Phil Simmons	Leicestershire	2,188	87	1,021	56	6–14	18.23	3	0
Dimitri Mascarenhas	Hampshire	552	21	297	16	6–88	18.56	1	0

=== List A ===
Batting Qualification: eight innings

English List A batting averages, 1996
Player	Team(s)	M	I	NO	Runs	HS	Ave	100	50
Peter Martin	England, Lancashire	29	12	11	78	35*	78.00	0	0
Dean Jones	Derbyshire	22	21	4	1,151	142	67.70	6	3
Andy Hayhurst	Somerset	14	10	6	263	67*	65.75	0	2
Michael Bevan	Yorkshire	22	21	5	1,023	98*	63.93	0	9
Robert Cunliffe	Gloucestershire	10	10	2	479	137*	59.87	2	2
Paul Johnson	Nottinghamshire	21	20	7	765	99*	58.84	0	7

Bowling Qualification: ten wickets

English List A bowling averages, 1996
Player	Team(s)	Balls	Mdns	Runs	Wkts	BB	Ave	5wI
Adam Hollioake	England, Surrey	998	4	835	56	5–44	14.91	2
Owen Parkin	Glamorgan	300	6	196	12	5–28	16.33	1
Shaun Pollock	Warwickshire	1,113	18	726	44	6–21	16.50	2
Michael Bevan	Yorkshire	277	3	237	14	5–29	16.92	1
Dermot Reeve	Warwickshire	591	9	356	21	4–23	16.95	0
Kevan James	Hampshire	690	4	552	31	6–35	17.80	1

== External sources ==
- CricketArchive – season and tournament itineraries

== Annual reviews ==
- Playfair Cricket Annual 1997
- Wisden Cricketers' Almanack 1997
