= Creeting St Mary =

Village in Suffolk, England

Coordinates: 52.169°N 1.067°E

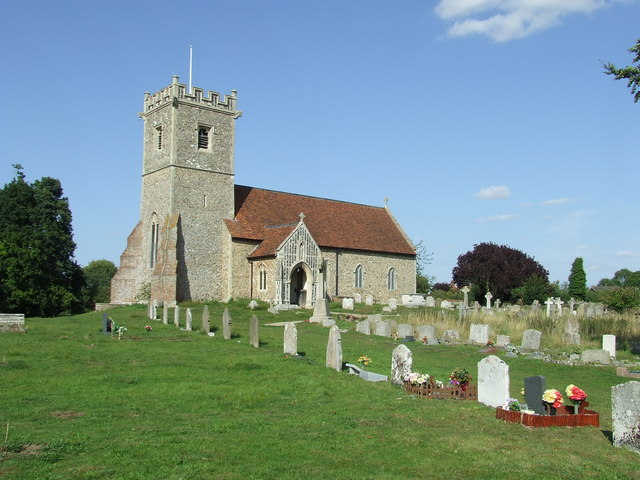
- The Church of St Mary, Creeting St Mary

- Location within Suffolk
- Population: 697 (2011)
- Civil parish: Creeting St Mary
- District: Mid Suffolk
- Shire county: Suffolk
- Region: East
- Country: England
- Sovereign state: United Kingdom
- Post town: IPSWICH
- Postcode district: IP6
- Dialling code: 01449
- Police: Suffolk
- Fire: Suffolk
- Ambulance: East of England

Creeting St Mary is a village and civil parish in the Mid Suffolk district of Suffolk in eastern England. Sandwiched between the A14 and A140 to the north of Needham Market, the parish also includes the hamlet of Creeting Bottoms. In 2005 the parish population was 710, which decreased to 697 at the 2011 Census.

== History ==
Formerly three parishes, Creeting All Saints and Creeting St Olave were consolidated into Creeting St Mary on 25 March 1884. The consolidated parish had 3,115 residents and in 1901 had 636.

== Heritage ==
The buck of a windmill survives in the village. It was used as a dovecote after ceasing to be a windmill.

St Mary's Church has been listed grade II* by English Heritage. The parish was originally in the Hundred of Bosmere and Claydon.

== Notable people ==
- John Austin (1790–1859), legal thinker responsible for the theory of legal positivism, was born here, the eldest son of the miller.
- Michael Peck (born 1967), a first-class cricketer, was born here.

== Amenities ==
The village has a voluntarily aided Church of England primary school with 80–90 pupils. The Victorian building of the school, still in use for some classes, dates from 1871.

The village also has a charitable pre-school based in the Diamond Jubilee Hall. There are public playground facilities in Blacksmiths Field.

Creeting St Mary has a pub/restaurant, The Highwayman, and several other catering, retail and service outlets. Semi-soft Suffolk Gold cheese has been made here since 2004 by a family firm.
