= Creeting All Saints =

Former civil parish in Suffolk, England

Coordinates: 52.1686°N 1.0595°E

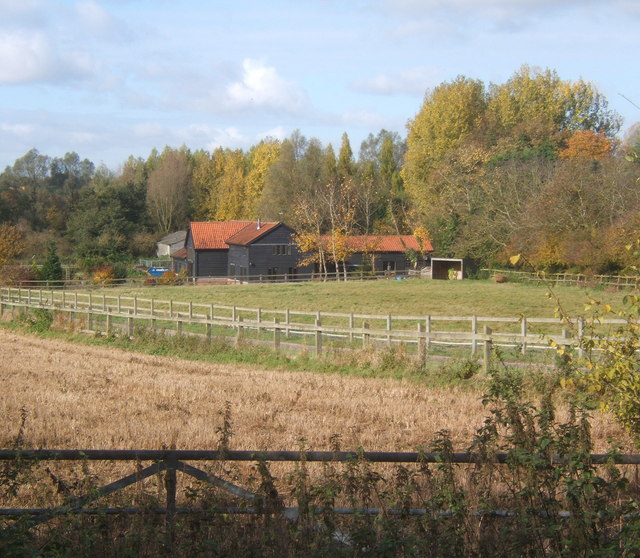

- Location within Suffolk
- Civil parish: Creeting St Mary
- District: Mid Suffolk
- Shire county: Suffolk
- Region: East
- Country: England
- Sovereign state: United Kingdom
- Post town: IPSWICH
- Postcode district: IP6
- Dialling code: 01449
- UK Parliament: Central Suffolk and North Ipswich

Creeting All Saints is a former civil parish, now in the parish of Creeting St Mary, in the Mid Suffolk district, in the county of Suffolk, England. It was once located in Bosmere and Claydon Hundred. The parish church used to share a churchyard with Creeting St Mary until it was damaged beyond repair by a storm in 1800. The ruins were demolished in 1813. Nothing remains of the old church and much of the masonry has been reused in the church of Creeting St Mary. However the old font was installed in the Holy Trinity Church, Stowupland. In 1881 the parish had a population of 300. On 25 March 1884 the parish was abolished and merged with Creeting St. Mary.
