= Holmbush, Cornwall =

Village in Cornwall, England

Coordinates: 50.339°N 4.763°W

Holmbush
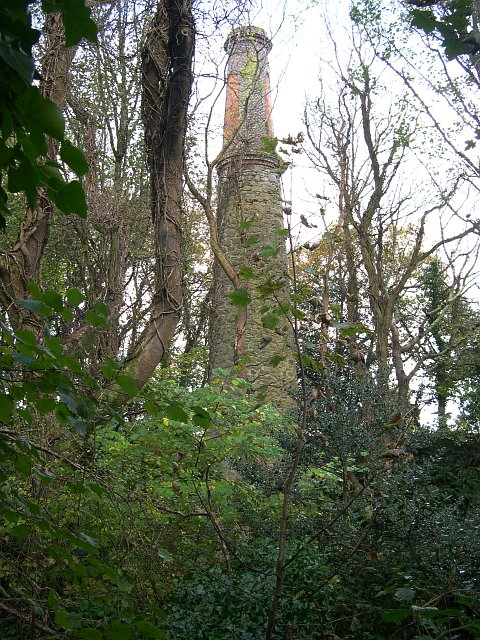
- Mine chimney at the disused Wheal Eliza Consols tin mine

- Location within Cornwall
- OS grid reference: SX035525
- Civil parish: St Austell CP
- Unitary authority: Cornwall
- Ceremonial county: Cornwall
- Region: South West
- Country: England
- Sovereign state: United Kingdom
- Post town: ST. AUSTELL
- Postcode district: PL25
- Dialling code: 01726
- Police: Devon and Cornwall
- Fire: Cornwall
- Ambulance: South Western
- UK Parliament: St Austell and Newquay

Holmbush is a village in Cornwall, England that is situated in the suburban area of St Austell (where the population at the 2011 census was included). It was a centre for tin and copper mining in the eighteenth and nineteenth centuries, with a few houses to the south of the A390 road. It was developed in the 1970s, with the construction of housing and an industrial estate to the north of the road. Since 1974, the site of Cuddra mine has been developed as Pinetum Gardens, an attraction holding over 6,000 varieties of plants, many collected by the owner on plant hunting expeditions.

== Development ==
Most of Holmbush is comparatively recent. In the 1880s, the main centre of population was on the south side of what is now the main A390 road, sandwiched between the road and the railway to St Austell. To the north of the housing was the West Wheal Eliza tin mine. To the north east was Wheal Eliza Consols tin mine, while to the east, Cuddra tin and copper mine was already disused, and further east was the disused South Cuddra copper mine. By 1907, Cuddra mine was no longer marked on the map, and West Wheal Eliza and Wheal Eliza Consols were both marked as disused. No further development is obvious on the 1963 map but the 1971 map shows the development of housing to the north of the main road, with a few larger buildings to the east, which is now the site of the industrial estate. The 1977 map shows the Wheal Eliza cricket ground, constructed in 1973 on part of the West Wheal Eliza site, which was first used for Minor Counties Championship matches in 1982, when Cornwall played Dorset. Modern maps still show tips between the cricket ground and the industrial estate and at Cuddra. The main area is marked as Cuddra Plantations, and is the location of Pinetum Gardens and a nursery. Wheal Eliza Consols is still named.

== Tourism ==
Near to the remains of Wheal Eliza Consols mine is Boscundle Manor, a farmhouse built in the 18th century and now a hotel and restaurant. Although modernised, it is a Grade II Listed building. The site of Cuddra mine was the location of Pine Lodge, which was bought in 1974, and became the centre of Pinetum Park and Pine Lodge Gardens. The new owners used it as a showpiece for their collections of plants, obtained from seeds collected on plant hunting expeditions around the world. It now includes a formal garden, a cottage garden, a formal garden, water features and a lake, shrubberies, a pinetum, an arboretum, a Japanese garden and a 3-acre (1.2 ha) winter garden. Over 6,000 species of plants have been labelled by the owner, Mrs Shirley Clemo, and in 2008 the gardens were given a Bronze Award in the Small Visitor Attraction of the Year category, in recognition of their contribution to tourism in Cornwall.

== History ==
Holmbush was the location of Charlestown United Mines, one of a series of metal mines in the vicinity. It produced large quantities of tin and copper in the early nineteenth century. In addition to the engine house shafts, there were whim shafts, where a winch was used to raise the ore, which was then crushed in stamps powered by water wheels and by steam engines. The ore was transported to nearby Charlestown for export. In 1838, it employed a total of 814 people, 431 men, 120 women and 263 children. There were 283 adults living in the village according to the census of 1851, of whom ten were miners and one was a mine manager. One of the miners also worked as a cooper, as did ten other men. The census also recorded a tea-dealer and a hobbler Charlestown United Mines later became part of Charlestown United and Cuddra Consolidated Mines, who owned four mines in the vicinity.

=== Cornish wrestling ===
Cornish wrestling tournaments were held in Holmbush in the early 1900s.
