= Wheal Eliza =

Cricket ground in Holmbush, Cornwall, England

Ground information
- Location: St Austell, Cornwall
- Coordinates: 50.3436°N 4.7535°W
- Establishment: 1973
- End names
- Jewson End; Britannia End

Team information
Cornwall	(1982–present)
- As of 10 June 2010; Source: Ground profile

Wheal Eliza is a cricket ground in Holmbush, to the east of St Austell, Cornwall. The ground is bordered to the south by Holmbush Road, to the east by the A391 road and to the north and west by housing. The end names of the ground are the Jewson End and the Britannia End. Facilities include two playing fields with their own changing room facilities enabling two competitive matches to be played every match day. The ground also has a pavilion, scorebox, artificial and grass nets.

== History ==
Established in 1973, the land surrounding the site of the ground had previously been used for mining. Cornwall first played there against Dorset in the 1982 Minor Counties Championship. A single Minor Counties Championship match was played annually there throughout the remainder of that decade and into the 1990s. The ground held its first MCCA Knockout Trophy match in 1994 when Cornwall played Devon, while the following season it held its first List A match when Cornwall played Middlesex in the 1995 NatWest Trophy, while the following season it held a second match in that format when Cornwall played Warwickshire. Cornwall lost both matches against their first-class opponents. No Minor Counties Championship match was played there in 1999, which was the first time no match had been played there since 1982. Minor Counties Championship cricket returned there in 2000, with Cornwall playing annually there until 2006. Cornwall returned to the ground in 2009 to play an MCCA Knockout Trophy fixture against Wiltshire, with them having since played a further two matches in that competition at the ground. Minor Counties Championship cricket returned there in 2010, with the resumption of an annual fixture.

The ground is the home venue St Austell Cricket Club who play in the Cornwall Cricket League.

== Records ==
=== List A ===
- Highest team total: 311/9 (60 overs) by Warwickshire v Cornwall, 1996
- Lowest team total: 178 all out (28.5 overs), as above
- Highest individual innings: 143* by Paul Weekes for Middlesex v Cornwall, 1995
- Best bowling in an innings: 4/65 by David Angove for Cornwall v Warwickshire, 1996

== See also ==
- List of Cornwall County Cricket Club grounds
- List of cricket grounds in England and Wales
