= Gary Palmer (cricketer) =

English cricketer (born 1965)

Personal information
- Full name: Gary Vincent Palmer
- Born: 15 November 1965 (age 60); Taunton, Somerset, England
- Batting: Right-handed
- Bowling: Right-arm medium
- Role: All-rounder
- Relatives: Ken Palmer (father); Roy Palmer (uncle)

Domestic team information
- Years: Team
- 1982–1989: Somerset
- FC debut: 21 August 1982 Somerset v Leicestershire
- Last FC: 25 April 1988 Somerset v Sussex
- LA debut: 22 August 1982 Somerset v Leicestershire
- Last LA: 18 June 1989 Somerset v Kent

Career statistics
Competition	First-class	List A
Matches	54	83
Runs scored	903	428
Batting average	15.30	16.46
100s/50s	0/3	0/1
Top score	78	53
Balls bowled	6,770	2,774
Wickets	92	77
Bowling average	44.64	30.48
5 wickets in innings	1	2
10 wickets in match	0	0
Best bowling	5/38	5/24
Catches/stumpings	30/–	10/–
- Source: CricketArchive, 9 August 2010

Gary Vincent Palmer (born 15 November 1965) played first-class and List A cricket for Somerset County Cricket Club from 1982 to 1989. He also played for the England Young Cricketers side in both under-19 Test and One-day International matches. He was born at Taunton, Somerset and is the son of the former Somerset and England Test cricketer Ken Palmer.

== Early cricket career ==
An all-rounder, Palmer was a lower order right-handed batsman and a right-arm medium-pace bowler. He made his first-class and List A cricket debuts as a 16-year-old for Somerset in 1982, making 27 in the second innings of his first first-class game. In 1983, he played in 10 first-class games and made both his highest score and took his career-best innings return in the season. In only his third first-class match, against Gloucestershire at Bristol, he made 78 and put on 124 for the seventh wicket with Peter Denning. Then, in the last match of the season against Warwickshire he took five wickets for 38 runs in the first innings, and this would be the only five-wicket haul of his first-class career.

In 1984, with Somerset's overseas players Viv Richards and Joel Garner absent playing for the West Indies touring team, Palmer played fairly regularly for both the first-class and List A sides. Wisden noted, though, that he "did not make the progress hoped for" and that, though "a spirited competitor, he possible needs more positive thought and application to bring greater consistency". In 16 first-class games, he hit 299 runs at an average of 16.61 with only one score of more than 50 and took 30 wickets at an average of 41.03 runs per wicket. Success was even more elusive in the one-day games: in 20 matches, he took only nine wickets at an average of more than 70 runs per wicket.

== Youth international player ==
In both 1983 and on the tour to the West Indies in 1984–85, Palmer played in England's youth cricket team as a lower order batsman and seam bowler. He played four under-19 Tests, including three on the West Indies tour, and in five youth One Day International matches.

== Later cricket career ==
Despite this recognition, Palmer's career at Somerset failed to take off. In 1985, he was restricted to eight first-class matches and 10 List A games; in 1986, there were just four and nine of each. His best performances in these seasons came in one-day matches. Against Kent at Canterbury in the John Player League in 1985, he took five wickets for 34 runs, his first five-wicket haul in limited-overs cricket. And the following year in the Benson and Hedges Cup match against Sussex at Hove he scored 53, his only innings of more than 50 in List A cricket. The departure of major cricketers – Richards, Garner and Ian Botham – after Somerset's disastrous 1986 season gave Palmer more opportunities in 1987, but his impact was confined largely to the one-day game and in the match against Kent at Canterbury he improved on his best bowling figures from two years before, taking five for 24: these remained the best List A bowling figures of his career.

But in 1988 he was dropped from the team for many games and after the 1989 season, when he played only one-day matches for the team, he left the Somerset staff.

After leaving Somerset, Palmer played Minor Counties cricket for Bedfordshire and Oxfordshire, second eleven cricket for Derbyshire, minor matches for Dorset and lesser matches for Marylebone Cricket Club (MCC). But he did not reappear in either first-class or List A cricket.
