= Michael Peck (cricketer) =

English cricketer

Personal information
- Full name: Michael John Peck
- Born: 23 January 1967 (age 59); Creeting St Mary, Suffolk, England
- Batting: Right-handed

Domestic team information
- Years: Team
- 1988–1995: Suffolk

Career statistics
Competition	List A
Matches	2
Runs scored	49
Batting average	24.50
100s/50s	–/–
Top score	49
Balls bowled	–
Wickets	–
Bowling average	–
5 wickets in innings	–
10 wickets in match	–
Best bowling	–
Catches/stumpings	1/–
- Source: Cricinfo, 5 July 2011

Michael John Peck (born 23 January 1967) is a former English cricketer. Peck was a right-handed batsman. He was born in Creeting St Mary, Suffolk.

Peck made his debut for Suffolk in the 1988 Minor Counties Championship against Durham. Peck played Minor counties cricket for Suffolk from 1988 to 1995, which included 51 Minor Counties Championship appearances and 6 MCCA Knockout Trophy matches. He made his List A debut against Worcestershire in the 1990 NatWest Trophy. In this match he was dismissed for a duck by Ian Botham. He made a further List A appearance against Gloucestershire in the 1995 NatWest Trophy. In this match, he scored 49 runs from 106 balls, before being dismissed by David Boden. He is a cousin of the ethologist Jeremy Marchant Forde.
