= Nigel Peel =

English cricketer

Personal information
- Full name: Nigel David Peel
- Born: 10 November 1967; Wythenshawe, Manchester, England
- Died: 28 January 2016 (aged 48); Charnock Richard, Lancashire, England
- Batting: Left-handed
- Bowling: Right-arm fast

Domestic team information
- Years: Team
- 1989–1996: Cheshire

Career statistics
Competition	List A
Matches	4
Runs scored	0
Batting average	0.00
100s/50s	–/–
Top score	0
Balls bowled	258
Wickets	4
Bowling average	49.00
5 wickets in innings	–
10 wickets in match	–
Best bowling	2/45
Catches/stumpings	–/–
- Source: Cricinfo, 13 April 2011

Nigel David Peel (10 November 1967 – 28 January 2016) was an English cricketer. Peel was a left-handed batsman who bowled right-arm fast. He was born in Wythenshawe, Manchester.

Peel made his debut for Cheshire in the 1989 Minor Counties Championship against Oxfordshire. He played Minor counties cricket for Cheshire from 1989 to 1996, including 59 Minor Counties Championship matches and 12 MCCA Knockout Trophy matches. In 1992, he made his List A debut against Gloucestershire in the NatWest Trophy. He played three further List A matches for Cheshire, the last coming against Northamptonshire in the 1996 NatWest Trophy. In his four List A matches, he was dismissed for a duck in each of his four innings. With the ball he took four wickets at a bowling average of 49.00, with best figures of 2/45.

He also played Second XI cricket for the Lancashire Second XI in 1989.

Peel died in Charnock Richard, Lancashire, near his home on 28 January 2016, after having suffered from a brain tumour.
