= Ben Hollioake =

English cricketer (1977–2002)

Personal information
- Full name: Benjamin Caine Hollioake
- Born: 11 November 1977; Melbourne, Victoria, Australia
- Died: 23 March 2002 (aged 24); Perth, Western Australia
- Height: 6 ft 2 in (1.88 m)
- Batting: Right-handed
- Bowling: Right arm fast-medium
- Role: All-rounder
- Relatives: Adam Hollioake (brother)

International information
- National side: England (1997–2002)
- Test debut (cap 588): 7 August 1997 v Australia
- Last Test: 31 August 1998 v Sri Lanka
- ODI debut (cap 146): 25 May 1997 v Australia
- Last ODI: 28 January 2002 v India

Domestic team information
- Years: Team
- 1996–2001: Surrey

Career statistics
Competition	Test	ODI	FC	LA
Matches	2	20	75	136
Runs scored	44	309	2794	2481
Batting average	11.00	20.60	25.87	24.08
100s/50s	0/0	0/2	3/14	0/14
Top score	28	63	163	98
Balls bowled	252	642	7293	4833
Wickets	4	8	126	142
Bowling average	49.75	66.50	33.45	28.22
5 wickets in innings	0	0	1	1
10 wickets in match	0	0	0	0
Best bowling	2/105	2/37	5/51	5/10
Catches/stumpings	2/–	6/–	68/–	44/–
- Source: ESPNcricinfo, 23 March 2002

Benjamin Caine Hollioake (11 November 1977 – 23 March 2002) was an English cricketer who played for Surrey County Cricket Club and the England cricket team. Born in Australia, Hollioake moved to England where he made his first-class cricketing debut for Surrey in 1996. A right-handed batsman and right-arm seam bowler, Hollioake's performances as an all-rounder saw him join his brother Adam in the 1997 England ODI team. Later that year, Adam and Ben Hollioake made their England Test debut in the same game, becoming only the third set of brothers to do so. Ben Hollioake made two Test appearances and earned 20 ODI caps before he was killed in a car crash in Australia at the age of 24.

== Biography ==
=== Early life ===
The son of an Australian engineer and his Indonesian wife, Ben Hollioake was born in Melbourne, Victoria, Australia, in 1977. Hollioake got his cricketing start in Hong Kong, where the family lived for two years until he was five, before they moved on to England. He played junior cricket in Sydney, in his first organised match for Gladesville District when he was 9 years old, he took figures of 9/13 in an under-12 match. Hollioake moved to England in 1984 along with his older brother, Adam, for 2 years and then a further 3 years in Hong Kong before returning to Australia. He was educated at Millfield Preparatory School and later at Wesley College, Perth.

=== Cricketing career ===
A graceful batsman who was capable of massive hitting, and a useful medium pacer with a knack of taking wickets, Ben joined his brother at Surrey in 1994. Hollioake made his first-class debut for Surrey in 1996, taking 4 for 74 against Yorkshire at Acklam Park, Middlesbrough. He was awarded the NBC Denis Compton Award that same year. In May 1997, aged 19, he was called up to England's ODI squad to play Australia. Making his debut batting at number three for the final game of the series at Lord's, Hollioake struck 63 runs off 48 balls and was named Man of the Match. England won the three-match series 3–0. His performance led the media to compare him to the great English all-rounder Ian Botham.

The following July, Hollioake produced another Man of the Match performance at Lords, this time taking two wickets and scoring 98 runs from 112 deliveries as Surrey defeated Kent in the final of the Benson & Hedges Cup.

England were not performing well in the 1997 Ashes series when Ben and Adam made their Test debuts together, on 7 August 1997. England was losing the six-Test series 2–1 when the Hollioake brothers were selected for the fifth Test, becoming the fifth set of brothers to play for England in the same Test and the third to make a debut together after the Grace and Hearne brothers. Aged 19 years and 269 days, Hollioake was England's youngest Test player since Brian Close in 1949. Losing his place in the team soon after, he toured Sri Lanka that winter with the England A team, scoring two centuries. Ben played one more Test match, against Sri Lanka in 1998, scoring 14 and 0 with the bat, and bowling two for 105.

The following year, Surrey awarded Hollioake his county cap, but his form began to waver and, by August 2000, he could not command a regular place in the county side that had won back-to-back county championships. After working hard on his technique during the winter break, Hollioake delivered several impressive performances for Surrey that led to his recall to the English ODI side in 2001.

In July 2001 he was once more man of the match in the final of the Benson and Hedges Cup at Lord's, where he scored 73 runs and helped Surrey to victory over Gloucestershire.

Steve James wrote in the Daily Telegraph:

At times he was so laid back as to be infuriating... but there was a remarkable warmth and gentleness in his character. Among the youngsters he was simply one thing: cool.

== Death ==
Hollioake died on 23 March 2002 in Perth, Western Australia, near his childhood school, Wesley College, when he crashed his Porsche 924 into a wall on the Mill Point Road exit of the Kwinana Freeway on his way home from a family celebration. His death at the age of 24 years and 132 days was the youngest of any England Test cricketer.

== Legacy ==
Following his death, Ben's brother, Adam Hollioake and his family established the Ben Hollioake Fund to raise funds for CHASE Hospice Care for Children. A range of fundraising activities have taken place, including breaking the world record for the number of participants in a continuous 100-metre relay in 2004.

At the Hong Kong Cricket Sixes, the player of the tournament award is named in his honour, the 'Ben Hollioake Award'.

At his old club, Surrey, an apprenticeship for an up-and-coming younger player was set up in 2003, also called the 'Ben Hollioake Award'.

== Honours ==
- County Championship (2) – 1999, 2000
- Benson and Hedges Cup (2) – 1997, 2001

== See also ==
- List of Test or One-day International cricket families
