= Neil Gill =

English cricketer

Personal information
- Full name: Neil Stuart Gill
- Born: 22 September 1971 (age 55); Bradford, Yorkshire, England
- Batting: Right-handed
- Bowling: Left-arm medium-fast

Domestic team information
- Years: Team
- 2000–2002: Yorkshire Cricket Board
- 1996–1998: Lincolnshire

Career statistics
| Competition | LA |
|---|---|
| Matches | 7 |
| Runs scored | 102 |
| Batting average | 25.50 |
| 100s/50s | –/– |
| Top score | 37* |
| Balls bowled | 393 |
| Wickets | 15 |
| Bowling average | 16.93 |
| 5 wickets in innings | – |
| 10 wickets in match | – |
| Best bowling | 4/44 |
| Catches/stumpings | 4/– |
- Source: Cricinfo, 4 November 2010

Neil Stuart Gill (born 22 September 1971) is a former English cricketer. Gill was a right-handed batsman who bowled left-arm medium-fast. He was born in Bradford, Yorkshire.

Gill made his debut in County Cricket for Lincolnshire against Northumberland in the 1996 Minor Counties Championship. From 1996 to 1998, he represented the county in 7 Championship matches, the last of which came against Buckinghamshire. He also represented the county in 2 MCCA Knockout Trophy matches against Bedfordshire in 1996 and Hertfordshire in 1997. Gill represented the county in a single List A match against Gloucestershire in the 1996 NatWest Trophy.

In 2000, he first represented the Worcestershire Cricket Board in List A cricket against the Yorkshire in the 2000 NatWest Trophy. From 1999 to 2002, he represented the Board in 6 List A matches, the last of which came against Northumberland in the 2nd round of the 2003 Cheltenham & Gloucester Trophy which was held in 2002. In his career total of 7 List A matches, he scored 102 runs at a batting average of 25.50, with a high score of 37*. In the field he took 4 catches. With the ball he took 15 wickets at a bowling average of 16.93, with best figures of 4/44.
