= Denton Brock =

English cricketer

Personal information
- Full name: Denton John Brock
- Born: 10 July 1971 (age 55); Newcastle-under-Lyme, Staffordshire, England
- Batting: Right-handed
- Bowling: Right-arm fast-medium

Domestic team information
- Years: Team
- 2000: Cheshire
- 1993–1999: Staffordshire

Career statistics
Competition	List A
Matches	4
Runs scored	25
Batting average	12.50
100s/50s	–/–
Top score	19
Balls bowled	184
Wickets	3
Bowling average	39.33
5 wickets in innings	–
10 wickets in match	–
Best bowling	1/21
Catches/stumpings	1/–
- Source: Cricinfo, 8 April 2011

Denton John Brock (born 10 July 1971) is a former English cricketer. Brock was a right-handed batsman who bowled right-arm fast-medium. He was born in Newcastle-under-Lyme, Staffordshire.

Brock made his debut for Staffordshire in the 1993 Minor Counties Championship against Buckinghamshire. Brock played Minor counties cricket for Staffordshire from 1993 to 1999, including 18 Minor Counties Championship matches and 7 MCCA Knockout Trophy matches. In 1996, he made his List A debut against Derbyshire in NatWest Trophy. He played two further List A matches for Staffordshire, against Nottinghamshire in 1997 and the Durham Cricket Board in the 1999 NatWest Trophy.

In 2000, Brock joined Cheshire, where he represented the team in two MCCA Knockout Trophy matches against Lincolnshire and Staffordshire. He also played a single List A match for Cheshire in the 2000 NatWest Trophy against Lincolnshire. In total, Brock played four List A matches, scoring 25 runs at a batting average of 12.50, with a high score of 19. With the ball he took 3 wickets at a bowling average of 39.33, with best figures of 1/21.

He also played Second XI cricket for the Warwickshire Second XI in 1994.
