= Rodney Bunting =

English cricketer

Personal information
- Full name: Rodney Alan Bunting
- Born: 25 April 1965 (age 61); East Winch, Norfolk, England
- Batting: Right-handed
- Bowling: Right-arm fast-medium

Domestic team information
- Years: Team
- 1985–1987: Norfolk
- 1987: Minor Counties
- 1988–1991: Sussex
- 1992–1995: Norfolk

Career statistics
Competition	First-class	List A
Matches	38	22
Runs scored	366	65
Batting average	14.07	9.28
100s/50s	0/2	0/0
Top score	73	18*
Balls bowled	5,150	963
Wickets	80	24
Bowling average	38.08	32.83
5 wickets in innings	3	0
10 wickets in match	0	0
Best bowling	5/44	4/35
Catches/stumpings	5/–	6/–
- Source: Cricinfo, 12 August 2011

Rodney Alan Bunting (born 25 April 1965) is a former English cricketer. Bunting was a right-handed batsman who bowled right-arm fast-medium. He was born at East Winch in Norfolk in 1965.

Bunting made his debut for Norfolk in the 1985 Minor Counties Championship against Northumberland. He played Minor counties cricket for Norfolk from 1985 to 1987, a period in which he also made his List A debut for Norfolk against Leicestershire in the 1985 NatWest Trophy. He also made 4 List A appearances for the Minor Counties in the 1987 Benson & Hedges Cup.

In 1988, he joined Sussex, who he made his first-class debut for against Gloucestershire in the 1988 County Championship. He made 37 further first-class appearances for Sussex, the last of which came against Cambridge University in 1991. In his 38 first-class matches, he scored a total of 366 runs at an average of 14.07, with a high score of 73. This score, one of two first-class fifties he made, came against Cambridge University in 1989. With the ball, he took 80 wickets at a bowling average of 38.08, with best figures of 5/44. These figures, one of three five wicket hauls he took, came against Warwickshire in the 1988 County Championship. He made his first List A appearance for Sussex against Kent in the 1988 Benson & Hedges Cup. He made 11 further List A appearances for Sussex, the last of which came against Lancashire in the 1991 Refuge Assurance League. In his 12 limited-overs appearances for Sussex, he took 14 wickets at an average of 27.92, with best figures of 4/35.

With opportunities limited at Sussex, Bunting returned to Norfolk for the 1992 season. He played Minor counties cricket for Norfolk until 1995, and including his first spell at the county, he made a total of 58 Minor Counties Championship appearances and 14 MCCA Knockout Trophy appearances. During this second spell with the county, he made a further 4 List A appearances, the last of which came against Lancashire in the 1995 NatWest Trophy. In his total of 5 List A matches for Norfolk, he took 6 wickets which came at an average of 38.33, with best figures of 3/40. He retired from county cricket at the end of the 1995 season.
