= Paul Beech =

English cricketer

Personal information
- Full name: Paul Beech
- Born: 2 October 1965 (age 61); Hailsham, Sussex, England
- Batting: Right-handed
- Bowling: Right-arm medium-fast

Domestic team information
- Years: Team
- 1992–1999: Cumberland

Career statistics
Competition	List A
Matches	4
Runs scored	92
Batting average	23.00
100s/50s	–/–
Top score	42
Balls bowled	150
Wickets	2
Bowling average	69.50
5 wickets in innings	–
10 wickets in match	–
Best bowling	1/21
Catches/stumpings	–/–
- Source: Cricinfo, 29 March 2011

Paul Beech (born 2 October 1965) is a former English cricketer. Beech was a right-handed batsman who bowled right-arm medium-fast. He was born in Hailsham, Sussex.

Beech made his debut for Cumberland in the 1992 Minor Counties Championship against Lincolnshire. Beech played Minor counties cricket for Cumberland from 1992 to 1999, including 32 Minor Counties Championship matches and 12 MCCA Knockout Trophy matches. In 1996, he made his List A debut against Middlesex in the NatWest Trophy. He played three further List A matches for Cumberland, the last of which came against the Middlesex Cricket Board in the 1999 NatWest Trophy. In his four List A matches, he scored 92 runs at a batting average of 23.00, with a high score of 42. With the ball he took 2 wickets at a bowling average of 69.50, with best figures of 1/21.
