= Steven van Dijk =

Dutch cricketer (born 1969)

Personal information
- Born: 23 August 1969 (age 57); Rotterdam, Netherlands
- Batting: Right-handed
- Bowling: Right-arm medium-fast
- Role: Bowler

International information
- National side: Netherlands (1996–1997)
- Source: CricketArchive, 11 March 2016

Steven van Dijk (born 23 August 1969) is a former Dutch international cricketer who represented the Dutch national side between 1992 and 1997. He played as a right-arm pace bowler.

Van Dijk was born in Rotterdam, and played his club cricket for VOC Rotterdam. He made his international debut in August 1992, in a friendly match against Denmark in Utrecht. Later in the year, he also played for the Netherlands against Eastern Province, a South African provincial team. After 1992, van Dijk did not again play for the Dutch senior team until June 1996, when he appeared in two matches against Pakistan (on its way to a tour of England). Later in the month, he also played a single match in the 1996 NatWest Trophy (an English county competition), against Surrey. In that game, he finished with figures of 4/57 from eight overs, and was named man of the match despite his team losing easily. At the 1997 ICC Trophy in Malaysia, van Dijk played in four of his team's seven matches, taking five wickets (including 3/35 against Denmark). He played his last match for the Netherlands later in the year, against Norfolk (a minor English county team).
