= Craig Miller (cricketer) =

English cricketer

Personal information
- Full name: Craig Aston Miller
- Born: 24 April 1971 (age 55); Wanstead, Essex, England
- Batting: Right-handed
- Bowling: Right-arm fast-medium

Domestic team information
- Years: Team
- 1992–1996: Suffolk

Career statistics
Competition	List A
Matches	3
Runs scored	13
Batting average	6.50
100s/50s	–/–
Top score	7
Balls bowled	216
Wickets	6
Bowling average	33.16
5 wickets in innings	–
10 wickets in match	–
Best bowling	2/61
Catches/stumpings	1/–
- Source: Cricinfo, 5 July 2011

Craig Aston Miller (born 24 April 1971) is a former English cricketer. Miller was a right-handed batsman who bowled right-arm fast-medium. He was born in Wanstead, Essex.

Miller made his debut for Suffolk in the 1992 Minor Counties Championship against Cumberland. Miller played Minor counties cricket for Suffolk from 1992 to 1996, which included 34 Minor Counties Championship appearances and 6 MCCA Knockout Trophy matches. He made his List A debut against Essex in the 1993 NatWest Trophy. He made 2 further List A appearances, against Gloucestershire in the 1995 NatWest Trophy and Somerset in the 1996 NatWest Trophy. In his 3 List A matches, he scored 13 runs at an average of 6.50, with a high score of 7. With the ball, he took 6 wickets at a bowling average of 33.16, with best figures of 2/61.
