= Stuart Bevins =

English cricketer

Cricket information
- Batting: Right-handed

Career statistics
Competition	First-class	List A
Matches	6	1
Runs scored	34	34
Batting average	8.50	17.00
100s/50s	0/0	0/0
Top score	10	26
Catches/stumpings	18/0	6/2
- Source: Cricinfo, 30 December 2021

Stuart Roy Bevins (born 8 March 1967) is an English former first-class cricketer who played a handful of matches for Worcestershire between 1989 and 1991; he later also had two List A game for Herefordshire, in 1995 and 1997.

Bevins came to prominence aged 18 in August 1985, when he captained, and kept wicket for, the Warwickshire Young Amateurs team which beat Lancashire Federation Under-19s to win the 1985 Oxford and Cambridge Festival. He dismissed three players, and two whom he stumped were to go on to have long careers in the game: future England captain Mike Atherton and Nick Speak. By 1987, Bevins was a regular in Worcestershire's second team, and that continued the following season as he waited for his break.

This came in May 1989, when he was called up to play against Nottinghamshire in the County Championship, usual keeper Steve Rhodes having been selected to make his One Day International debut. He dismissed only two batsmen (Michael Newell and Chris Broad), and scored 6 not out. In the continuing absence of Rhodes he was retained for the following match against Gloucestershire. Again Bevins was generally tidy but unspectacular behind the stumps. He also made his maiden one-day appearance in the Refuge Assurance League.

Bevins found it extremely hard to break Rhodes' stranglehold on the Worcestershire keeper's position, and over the next two years he made only four more first-class and five List A appearances. He did manage his only two stumpings in 1990 (both of England players: Eddie Hemmings and Geoff Humpage), but his inferiority to Rhodes with the bat was painfully obvious: he batted at number ten, and in six first-class and one List A innings for the county, he made a total of 34 runs with a top score of 10.

After 1991, Bevins never played again for Worcestershire. He did, however, make two appearances for Herefordshire in the NatWest Trophy. In 1995 he hit 26 against Durham (by some distance his highest score in senior cricket), and two years later he made 8 against Somerset; Herefordshire lost both matches by margins of over 200 runs. In neither game did Bevins take a catch or make a stumping.

He has since played in the Birmingham League for both Solihull Blossomfield and Highway.

His brother Martyn played Second XI cricket with Worcestershire in 1990.

His brother David was also a first class cricketer scoring regular 100's for Warwickshire and England.
