= James Govan (cricketer) =

Scottish cricketer (born 1966)

Cricket information
- Batting: Right-handed
- Bowling: Right-arm off-break

Career statistics
Competition	First-class	List A
Matches	13	30
Runs scored	142	321
Batting average	10.14	17.83
100s/50s	0/1	0/0
Top score	50	38*
Balls bowled	2,433	1,436
Wickets	42	21
Bowling average	27.45	49.04
5 wickets in innings	2	0
10 wickets in match	0	0
Best bowling	6/70	4/55
Catches/stumpings	6/–	5/–
- Source: CricketArchive, 3 February 2023

James Walter Govan (born 6 May 1966) is a former Scottish cricketer.

An offspinner, Govan appeared 5 times for Northamptonshire in the County Championship during the 1989 and 1990 seasons. He took his career best innings figures of 6 for 70 playing for Scotland against Ireland in 1992.
