= Craigmillar, Alberta =

Location of Craigmillar, Alberta

Craigmillar is a locality in Alberta, Canada.

The community was named after Craigmillar, Scotland, the native home of an early postmaster.
