= Adrian Pierson =

English cricketer (born 1963)

Personal information
- Full name: Adrian Roger Kirshaw Pierson
- Born: 21 July 1963 (age 63); Enfield, Greater London
- Batting: Right-handed
- Bowling: Right-arm off-break

Domestic team information
- Years: Team
- 1985–1991: Warwickshire
- 1992: Cambridgeshire
- 1993–1997: Leicestershire
- 1998–2000: Somerset
- 2001: Derbyshire

Career statistics
Competition	First-class	List A
Matches	180	119
Runs scored	2,651	385
Batting average	17.21	10.13
100s/50s	1/5	0/0
Top score	108*	31*
Balls bowled	27,324	4,887
Wickets	363	100
Bowling average	37.98	35.70
5 wickets in innings	14	1
10 wickets in match	0	0
Best bowling	8/42	5/36
Catches/stumpings	87/–	45/–
- Source: CricketArchive, 22 December 2015

Adrian Roger Kirshaw Pierson (born 21 July 1963) is a former first-class cricketer. He was a right-handed batsman and a right-arm off-break bowler. He was born at Enfield, Middlesex.

In sixteen years at the top level of cricket, he played for Cambridgeshire, Derbyshire, Leicestershire, Somerset and Warwickshire. Pierson was a skilful all-rounder who was later to coach the Derbyshire Scorpions into the 2003 final of the Twenty20 Cup, where they lost by one run to Leicestershire.

He now coaches and plays for Houghton and Thurnby Cricket Club, whilst captaining the first team.
