= Darrell Carter =

English cricketer

Darrell Carter (born 28 October 1967) is an English cricketer. He is a right-handed batsman and right-arm fast bowler who played for Suffolk. He was born in Welling.

Carter made his cricketing debut for Club Cricket Conference, for whom he played between 1992 and 1994, including a tour to South Africa and Namibia at the end of the 1993–94 season.

Upon his return at the start of the 1994 English season, he made his Minor Counties Championship debut against Cambridgeshire. He continued to play in the Minor Counties Championship until 1995.

Since 1998, Carter has played in the Shepherd Neame Kent Cricket League. He played for Beckenham until the end of the 2003 season, when he moved to Bexley, for whom he played between 2004 and 2005. He transferred to Hartley Country Club in 2006, for whom he still plays as of the 2010 season, alongside, among other players, former England Test cricketer Min Patel.
