= Charles Knightley (cricketer) =

English cricketer (born 1972)

Personal information
- Full name: Charles Stuart Knightley
- Born: 3 February 1972 (age 54); Cheltenham, Gloucestershire, England
- Batting: Left-handed
- Role: Wicket-keeper

Domestic team information
- Years: Team
- 1996–2012: Oxfordshire

Career statistics
Competition	List A
Matches	5
Runs scored	109
Batting average	27.25
100s/50s	0/1
Top score	61*
Catches/stumpings	4/–
- Source: Cricinfo, 20 May 2011

Charles Stuart Knightley (born 3 February 1972) is a former English cricketer. Knightley was a left-handed batsman and a wicket-keeper. He was born in Cheltenham, Gloucestershire.

After playing age-group and Second XI cricke for Gloucestershire, Knightley made his debut for Oxfordshire in the 1996 Minor Counties Championship against Shropshire. Knightley played Minor counties cricket for Oxfordshire from 1996 to 2012, which included 75 Minor Counties Championship matches and 21 MCCA Knockout Trophy matches. He made his List A debut against Lancashire in the 1996 NatWest Trophy. He played five further List A matches, the last coming against Herefordshire in the first round of the 2004 Cheltenham & Gloucester Trophy which was held in 2003. In his six List A matches he scored 109 runs at a batting average of 27.25, with a high score of 61*. His only half century came against Lancashire in the 1996 NatWest Trophy.

He has played for Essexover-50s, winning the Over-50s County Championship in 2022, and England over-50s, winning the Over-50s World Cup in 2023. He has also played for Stow-on-the-Wold RFC and London Scottish RFC.
