= Richard Stemp =

English cricketer (born 1967)

Personal information
- Full name: Richard David Stemp
- Born: 11 December 1967 (age 58); Erdington, Birmingham, England
- Batting: Right-handed
- Bowling: Slow left-arm orthodox

Career statistics
| Competition | First-class | List A |
|---|---|---|
| Matches | 166 | 153 |
| Runs scored | 1,657 | 226 |
| Batting average | 12.36 | 7.79 |
| 100s/50s | 0/3 | 0/0 |
| Top score | 66 | 29* |
| Balls bowled | 31,433 | 6,844 |
| Wickets | 385 | 161 |
| Bowling average | 35.20 | 31.42 |
| 5 wickets in innings | 14 | 0 |
| 10 wickets in match | 1 | 0 |
| Best bowling | 6/37 | 4/25 |
| Catches/stumpings | 68/– | 30/– |
- Source: CricInfo, 9 July 2011

Richard David Stemp (born 11 December 1967) is an English former first-class cricketer, who appeared for county sides—Worcestershire, Yorkshire, Nottinghamshire and Leicestershire—in a first-class career which spanned from 1990 to 2002.

Stemp was a slow left arm bowler, and was a member of the England squad picked to play New Zealand in 1994, but was left out of the final eleven.

Stemp was called up for the England A Tour of India and Bangladesh that winter and took 6-83 in the 1st unofficial 'Test', including a young Rahul Dravid among his wickets. In his review of the tour, Simon Hughes said Stemp was a "Test class spinner, good athlete but needs careful handling", suggesting "the more phlegmatic" Min Patel might be easier for then England captain Michael Atherton to handle. Although Stemp took more wickets than the two other spinners on the tour, it was Patel and Ian Salisbury who would have the Test careers. Stemp did join another England A tour to Pakistan the following winter, taking 5-64 in another victory in an unofficial 'Test'.

He has played club cricket for Northampton Saints in the Northants League.
