= Tony Wright (cricketer) =

English cricketer (born 1962)

Anthony John Wright (born 27 June 1962 in Stevenage, Hertfordshire), England was a Gloucestershire cricketer from 1980 until 1998.

A right-handed batsman, he scored 13440 runs for Gloucestershire which makes him one of 31 cricketers to have made over 10 000 runs for the county and puts him 20th for most runs (as of Feb 2007). His most prolific season with the bat came in 1991 when he made 1596 runs.

He was also highly successful in the one day game for Gloucestershire, his 5 centuries is the most by an Englishman for the county and his 7118 runs is their 3rd highest run aggregate.

In a game against Scotland in 1997 he made 177 which remains the highest ever individual one day score for Gloucestershire some 10 years later. His 311 run opening stand with Nicholas Trainor is the county's highest ever partnership for any wicket.

After he retired from the game he became a coach and was the first director of the Gloucestershire Academy when it was set up in 2002.
