= Jonathan Govett =

English cricketer (born 1969)

Jonathan Govett (born 22 June 1969) is a retired English cricket player. He was a left-handed batsman and right-arm fast-medium bowler who played for Berkshire.

== Personal life ==
He was born in St Germans, a small village in southwestern England on 22 June 1969.

== Playing career ==
Govett debuted in the Minor Counties Championship in 1995, four seasons after appearing for the only time in the Bain Clarkson Trophy in 1991. Govett made a single List A appearance, during the 1996 season, against Leicestershire. Berkshire lost the match, mainly thanks to a double century from England international Vince Wells.
