= David Cowan (cricketer) =

Scottish cricketer

Personal information
- Born: 30 March 1964 (age 62); St Andrews, Fife, Scotland
- Batting: Left-handed
- Bowling: Right-arm fast-medium

International information
- National side: Scotland (1989–1999)
- Source: CricketArchive, 2 February 2016

David Cowan (born 30 March 1964) is a former Scottish international cricketer who represented the Scottish national side between 1989 and 1999. He played as a right-arm pace bowler.

Cowan was born in St Andrews, and attended Bell Baxter High School in nearby Cupar. His club cricket was played for the Freuchie Cricket Club. Cowan made his debut for Scotland in May 1989, playing against Lancashire in the Benson & Hedges Cup. Against Northamptonshire in the 1990 edition of the competition, he took 3/36 from 11 overs, helping Scotland to a two-run victory. They were to be his best figures in List A cricket. Cowan made his first-class debut in June 1991, against Ireland, but made only sporadic appearances for Scotland over the following seasons. His first and only major international tournament was the 1997 ICC Trophy in Malaysia, although he played only match at the event (against Italy. Cowan made his last appearance for Scotland in the 1999 NatWest Trophy, against Dorset.
