= Paul Berry (cricketer) =

English cricketer

Paul Berry (born 21 December 1968) was an English cricketer. He was a right-handed batsman and right-arm off-break bowler and wicket-keeper who played for Cumberland. He was born in Salford.

Berry began his career in the Second XI Championship with Lancashire, with whom he played between 1989 and 1994. He played Minor Counties cricket for Cheshire between 1992 and 2002, and for Cumberland between 1994 and 1995.

He made a single List A appearance for the side, during the 1995 NatWest Trophy competition. He scored 81 runs from the upper-middle order, the highest score on the Cumberland team.

He took a single catch from behind the stumps, that of Vikram Solanki.
