= Stephen Williams (cricketer, born 1967) =

English cricketer

Personal information
- Full name: Stephen Mark Williams
- Born: 23 October 1967 (age 59); Redruth, Cornwall, England
- Batting: Right-handed
- Bowling: Right-arm medium

Domestic team information
- Years: Team
- 1988–2000: Cornwall

Career statistics
Competition	List A
Matches	4
Runs scored	151
Batting average	37.75
100s/50s	–/1
Top score	52
Balls bowled	53
Wickets	–
Bowling average	–
5 wickets in innings	–
10 wickets in match	–
Best bowling	–
Catches/stumpings	1/–
- Source: Cricinfo, 2 September 2012

Stephen Williams (born 23 October 1967) was an English cricketer. He was a right-handed batsman and right-arm medium-pace bowler who played for Cornwall. He was born in Redruth.

Having made his Minor Counties Championship debut during the 1988 season, Williams made List A debut in the 1995 season, against Middlesex, scoring a commendable 48 runs, the highest score of the Cornwall team.

Williams' impressive form followed into his next game, scoring his List A best of 52 runs, his only half-century.

Taking the next two seasons out of the game, Williams played two further List A matches, in 1999 and 2000.
