= Robert Horner (cricketer) =

English cricketer

Robert Horner (born 20 January 1967) was an English cricketer. He was a right-handed batsman and wicket-keeper who played for Berkshire. He was born in Liskeard.

Horner, who represented Berkshire in the Minor Counties Championship between 1994 and 1999, made a single List A appearance for the team, during the 1995 NatWest Trophy, against Surrey. Horner scored 32 runs in the match, the highest score of anyone in the Berkshire team, though he was unable to save the team from a nine-wicket defeat.
