= Matthew Elliott (cricketer) =

Australian cricketer

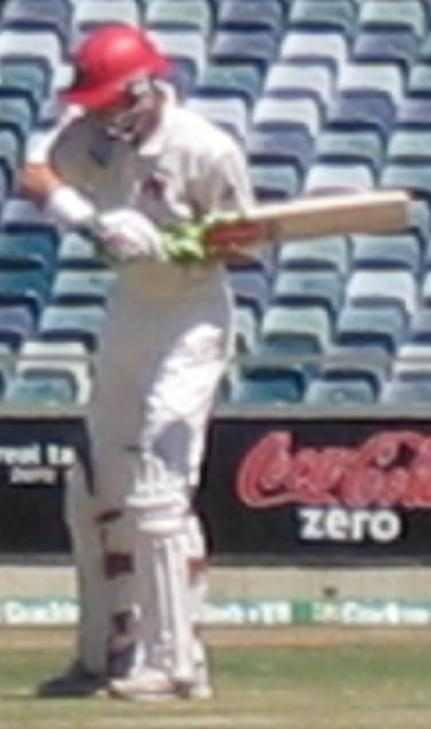
- Elliott playing for South Australia in 2007

Personal information
- Full name: Matthew Thomas Gray Elliott
- Born: 28 September 1971 (age 55); Chelsea, Victoria, Australia
- Nickname: Herb
- Batting: Left-handed
- Bowling: Left-arm medium
- Role: Opening batsman
- Relatives: Sam Elliott (son)

International information
- National side: Australia (1996–2004)
- Test debut (cap 368): 22 November 1996 v West Indies
- Last Test: 1 July 2004 v Sri Lanka
- Only ODI (cap 164): 25 May 1997 v England

Domestic team information
- Years: Team
- 1992/93–2004/05: Victoria
- 2000: Glamorgan
- 2002: Yorkshire
- 2004–2007: Glamorgan
- 2005/06–2007/08: South Australia

Career statistics
Competition	Test	ODI	FC	LA
Matches	21	1	214	162
Runs scored	1,172	1	17,521	6,211
Batting average	33.48	1.00	47.00	46.00
100s/50s	3/4	0/0	50/84	17/35
Top score	199	1	203	156
Balls bowled	12	–	1,242	92
Wickets	0	–	13	0
Bowling average	–	–	58.00	–
5 wickets in innings	–	–	0	–
10 wickets in match	–	–	0	–
Best bowling	–	–	3/68	–
Catches/stumpings	14/–	0/–	230/–	61/–
- Source: ESPNcricinfo, 6 January 2023

Matthew Thomas Gray Elliott (born 28 September 1971) is an Australian former cricketer, who played as a left-handed opening batsman. After he made his debut for Victoria in the 1992–93 season, he soon established himself as one of the top opening batsmen in Australian domestic cricket.

== Test career ==
Elliott was called up to the Australian national team in the 1996–97 season, making his Test debut against the West Indies in November 1996. Unfortunately for Elliott, in only his second Test match he was injured in a mid-pitch collision with teammate Mark Waugh, resulting in the need for knee surgery.

Elliott returned for the 1996–97 tour of South Africa. He retained his place for the 1997 tour of England, scoring two centuries in the Ashes series, including a career-best 199. He also made his One Day International debut in 1997 in the Texaco Trophy, but scored 1, making it his only appearance in a limited overs international. Elliott was named one of the Wisden Cricketers of the Year for 1998, although this wasn't enough for him to hold down a regular spot in the Australian team, and due to inconsistent performances after the Ashes series he slipped out of the national team in 1999. Steve Waugh, in his autobiography, described Elliott as "technically gifted but temperamentally flawed" and "prone to serious bouts of self-doubt and a tendency to let injuries rule his thought processes." Waugh stated that "[Elliott] would have been a perfect candidate...[for] a sports psychologist."

Elliott continued to perform at domestic level for Victoria and on the English county scene, and in the 2003–04 season scored a remarkable 1381 runs in the Pura Cup, overtaking Graham Yallop's previous record (which was succeeded the very next year in 2004–05 by Michael Bevan). Rewarded with the Pura Cup Player of the Year award and a new Cricket Australia contract, he was recalled to the national team for the first time in five years. However, he played in just one unsuccessful Test against Sri Lanka, where he batted at number 3 in place of Ricky Ponting (who was absent because of a family bereavement); batting outside his normal position, Elliott scored just 0 and 1.

This performance dented hopes of a resurgence in his international career greatly. In addition to this, he also had a below-par season in the subsequent 2004–05 domestic season for Victoria, averaging in the mid-30s.

== Move to South Australia ==
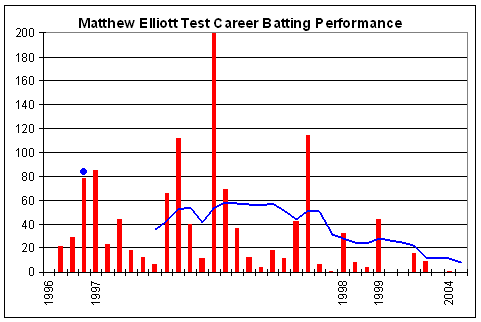
Matthew Elliott's Test career batting performance

In April 2005, Elliott made a request to leave the Victorian team to join South Australia as player-coach; this was originally rejected by Cricket Victoria although Elliott appealed their decision. On 5 May, a Cricket Australia grievance tribunal overturned Cricket Victoria's decision, freeing the way for Elliott to move.

In the 2005–06 season, Elliott struggled with injury and inconsistent form. The 2006–07 season was equally disappointing, with just 193 runs at 13.8 from seven first class games. As a result, he was axed from the South Australian state team. Curiously his form in the domestic one-day competition was much better with 465 runs at 51.6, highlighted by two centuries.

== English county cricket ==
On the English county scene, Elliott made a century at Lord's in the 2002 C&G Trophy final to win the title for Yorkshire - their first one-day trophy for 15 years. He signed a short-term contract for the 2007 season with Yorkshire as cover for Yorkshire's primary overseas player Younis Khan, who was due to be participating in the 2007 Cricket World Cup. However, following Pakistan's untimely exit, Younis was able to take up his role at his new county from the start of the season, thus Elliott was left surplus to requirements. Following the cancellation, Elliott agreed to join Glamorgan on a four-week deal as cover for Australian left-handed batsmen Jimmy Maher.

== Retirement ==
Elliott announced his retirement from first-class cricket in February 2008. He then played for the Chandigarh Lions in the Indian Cricket League.

== Personal life ==
Elliott's son, Will Elliott, is an Australian rules footballer who currently plays for the Northern Bullants in the Victorian Football League (VFL). He played for Box Hill in 2023, before joining the Bullants for the 2024 VFL season after being overlooked at the 2023 AFL draft. Elliott's other son, Sam is a first class cricketer who also plays for the Melbourne Renegades in the Big Bash League.
