= Bradleigh Donelan =

British Cricketer

Personal information
- Full name: Bradleigh Thomas Peter Donelan
- Born: 3 January 1968 (age 58); Park Royal, Middlesex, England
- Batting: Right-handed
- Bowling: Right-arm off-break

Domestic team information
- Years: Team
- 1989–1993: Sussex
- 1994: Somerset
- 1995–1999: Cambridgeshire

Career statistics
| Competition | FC | LA |
|---|---|---|
| Matches | 53 | 22 |
| Runs scored | 1105 | 207 |
| Batting average | 24.55 | 23.00 |
| 100s/50s | 0/5 | 0/0 |
| Top score | 68* | 32 |
| Balls bowled | 8626 | 900 |
| Wickets | 106 | 10 |
| Bowling average | 43.65 | 72.80 |
| 5 wickets in innings | 4 | 0 |
| 10 wickets in match | 1 | n/a |
| Best bowling | 6/62 | 2/39 |
| Catches/stumpings | 14/– | 3/– |
- Source: CricketArchive, 22 December 2015

Bradleigh Thomas Peter Donelan (born 3 January 1968) played first-class and List A cricket for Sussex between 1989 and 1993, and then a single first-class match for Somerset in 1994. Between 1995 and 1999, he played Minor Counties cricket for Cambridgeshire and in this period also appeared in List A matches for the county. He was born at Park Royal, Middlesex.
