= David Angove =

English cricketer

Personal information
- Full name: David Angove
- Born: 7 March 1974 (age 52); Truro, England
- Height: 5 ft 11 in (1.80 m)
- Batting: Right-handed
- Bowling: Right-arm fast
- Role: Bowler

Domestic team information
- Years: Team
- 1995–2000: Cornwall
- Only LA: 25 June 1996 Cornwall v Warwickshire

Career statistics
Competition	List A	MCC
Matches	1	26
Runs scored	6	111
Batting average	6.00	7.40
100s/50s	0/0	0/0
Top score	6	16*
Balls bowled	72	3256
Wickets	4	69
Bowling average	16.25	32.13
5 wickets in innings	0	1
10 wickets in match	0	0
Best bowling	4/65	6/25
Catches/stumpings	0/–	7/–
- Source: CricketArchive, 10 January 2010

David Angove (born 7 March 1974) is an English former cricketer who played for Cornwall County Cricket Club. In his only List A appearance he scored 6 runs and took 4 wickets for 65 runs. against Warwickshire in the 1996 NatWest Trophy. This performance was noted by Warwickshire, who immediately picked Angove for their upcoming Second XI fixture against Middlesex.

Angove went on to play 4 matches in the Second XI Championship, two for Warwickshire and two for Essex. The following season, Angove played one game for Worcestershire in the Second XI Limited Overs tournament.

He played 26 Minor Counties Championship games for Cornwall, and also 6 Minor counties trophy games for Cornwall.
