= Peter Chadwick (cricketer) =

English cricketer (born 1934)

John Peter Granville Chadwick (born 8 November 1934) is an English first-class cricketer, who played six matches for Yorkshire County Cricket Club between 1960 and 1965. A right-handed batsman, he scored 106 runs at 17.66 with a top score of 59 against Middlesex. He took two wickets with his right arm medium pace against Derbyshire.

Chadwick was born in Pateley Bridge, Yorkshire, England on 8 November 1934. He also played for Yorkshire's Second XI from 1958 to 1963, and Derbyshire's Second XI in 1963.
