= Robert Cunliffe (cricketer) =

English cricketer

Robert Cunliffe (born 8 November 1973) is an English cricketer. He is a right-handed batsman and a right-arm medium-pace bowler. During his nine years in first-class cricket he played for Gloucestershire and Leicestershire.

Cunliffe played in six Youth Test matches for England in the calendar year of 1993. Thanks to two not out innings and a high score of 98, he finished with a Youth Test average of 58. A generally consistent mid-order batsman, he made his first cricketing appearances in the Minor Counties Championship for Oxfordshire in 1991, and moved to Gloucestershire in the same year.

With the promise of First Division cricket, he decided to make the move to Leicestershire in 2002, before retiring from first-class cricket a year later.
