= Mike Smith (cricketer, born 1967) =

English cricketer (born 1967)

Personal information
- Full name: Andrew Michael Smith
- Born: 1 October 1967 (age 59); Dewsbury, Yorkshire
- Height: 5 ft 9 in (1.75 m)
- Batting: Right-handed
- Bowling: Left arm fast-medium
- Role: Bowler

International information
- National side: England (1997)
- Only Test: 24 July 1997 v Australia

Domestic team information
- Years: Team
- 1991–2004: Gloucestershire

Career statistics
Competition	Tests	FC	LA	T20
Matches	1	157	258	10
Runs scored	4	1,756	509	–
Batting average	4.00	12.19	10.38	–
100s/50s	0/0	0/4	0/0	–/–
Top score	4*	61	26*	–
Balls bowled	138	26,470	12,064	211
Wickets	0	533	305	8
Bowling average	–	24.68	26.23	22.75
5 wickets in innings	0	22	2	0
10 wickets in match	0	5	0	0
Best bowling	–	8/73	6/39	2/14
Catches/stumpings	0/–	31/–	49/–	2/–
- Source: Cricinfo, 7 August 2018

Andrew Michael Smith (born 1 October 1967) is a former English cricketer. He was born at Dewsbury in Yorkshire.

Smith was an effective swing bowler for Gloucestershire, and played a single Test for England at Headingley in 1997 against Australia. Graham Thorpe dropped Matthew Elliott at first slip while on 29, for what would have been Smith's first (and only) Test wicket. Elliot went on to make 199 and Australia won comfortably by an innings.

He was never picked to play for England again, but remained one of the most consistent swing bowlers on the county circuit until his retirement in 2003. He later worked as an employment solicitor at Bevan Brittan in Bristol.
