= Tony Clarkson (cricketer) =

English cricketer

Personal information
- Full name: Anthony Clarkson
- Born: 5 September 1939 (age 87); Killinghall, Harrogate, Yorkshire, England
- Batting: Right-handed
- Bowling: Right-arm off-break
- Role: Batsman

Domestic team information
- Years: Team
- 1963: Yorkshire
- 1966–1971: Somerset
- FC debut: 19 June 1963 Yorkshire v Gloucestershire
- Last FC: 30 August 1971 Somerset v Indians
- LA debut: 14 June 1967 Somerset v Northamptonshire
- Last LA: 22 August 1971 Somerset v Worcestershire

Career statistics
Competition	First-class	List A
Matches	110	50
Runs scored	4,458	762
Batting average	25.18	16.93
100s/50s	2/23	1/0
Top score	131	102*
Balls bowled	756	54
Wickets	13	2
Bowling average	28.23	31.00
5 wickets in innings	0	0
10 wickets in match	0	0
Best bowling	3/51	2/56
Catches/stumpings	52/–	13/–
- Source: CricketArchive, 20 December 2009

Anthony Clarkson (born 5 September 1939) is an English former first-class cricketer, who played for Yorkshire County Cricket Club and Somerset County Cricket Club. He was born at Killinghall, Harrogate, Yorkshire.

== Biography ==
Clarkson was a right-handed opening batsman and off break bowler, and played his early cricket for the Harrogate Club, for whom he opened both the batting and the bowling. After first playing for the Yorkshire Second XI in 1958, he made his debut for his native county in 1963, playing when the Test stars were away. He moved to Somerset in 1966 and played until 1971, winning his Somerset cap in 1968. Clarkson's father had been a league professional for Rothwell C.C. in the Leeds League before World War II.

In 110 matches he scored 4,458 runs at 25.18, with two centuries and a best of 131 for an average of 25.18. He took 13 wickets at 28.25. He played 50 one day games, scoring 752 runs with a best of 102* at 16.93, and taking two wickets.

He played for several clubs as a professional until 1991, when he retired aged 51. He had five successful years in the North Yorkshire-South Durham league, scoring more than 1,000 runs each season and, in the Bradford League, playing for Windhill, he was second only to Vinoo Mankad in their aggregate run scores.

After retiring from the field, Clarkson became an umpire. He began his first-class umpiring career with a few university matches in 1992, then joined the county circuit in 1996. He umpired 130 first-class matches between 1992 and 2004.

Clarkson spent the 1980s in the Harrogate area, employed as Customer Services Manager for Yorkshire Water. One of his colleagues was Peter Chadwick, who played for Yorkshire with Clarkson in the 1960s.
