= Owen Parkin =

English cricketer (born 1972)

Personal information
- Full name: Owen Thomas Parkin
- Born: 24 September 1972 (age 54); Coventry, Warwickshire, England
- Height: 6 ft 1 in (1.85 m)
- Batting: Right-handed
- Bowling: Right arm medium
- Role: Bowler, batsman

Domestic team information
- Years: Team
- 1992–1993: Dorset
- 1994–2003: Glamorgan
- First-class debut: 4 August 1994 Glamorgan v Middlesex
- List A debut: 24 June 1992 Dorset v Hampshire

Career statistics
Competition	FC	LA	T20
Matches	41	96	3
Runs scored	228	77	–
Batting average	8.14	3.50	–
100s/50s	0/0	0/0	–
Top score	24*	14*	300*
Balls bowled	6,099	4,147	66
Wickets	108	123	3
Bowling average	27.90	26.47	30.00
5 wickets in innings	2	1	0
10 wickets in match	0	0	0
Best bowling		5/28	2/9
Catches/stumpings	12/–	22/–	0/–
- Source: CricketArchive, 2 December 2016

Owen Thomas Parkin (born 24 September 1972) is a retired English cricketer. He is a right-handed batsman and a right-arm medium-pace bowler. Born in Coventry, his first-class career began with Glamorgan in 1994, playing twice during the 1994 County Championship, and taking 5/28 on his Sunday League debut, after a season in which he had spent much of the time incapacitated with a back injury. For a few years, he was a regular member of the Glamorgan team in both 4-day and 1-day cricket, but towards the end of his career, he was regarded more as a specialist one-day bowler, and played an important role in Glamorgan's National League successes in the early 2000s. He retired from first-class cricket in 2003.

Before joining Glamorgan, he played in the 1991 Second XI championship with Hampshire and also for Dorset Minor Counties.

Following his retirement, Parkin went into education as a mathematics teacher. He taught at Milton Abbey School from 2008 to 2011, and at Canford School from 2011 onwards. He has been a housemaster at both establishments.
