= Roy Palmer (cricketer) =

English cricketer

Personal information
- Full name: Roy Palmer
- Born: 12 July 1942 (age 84); Devizes, Wiltshire, England
- Batting: Right-handed
- Bowling: Right-arm fast-medium
- Role: Bowler
- Relatives: Ken Palmer (brother); Gary Palmer (nephew)

Domestic team information
- Years: Team
- 1965–1970: Somerset
- FC debut: 19 June 1965 Somerset v Cambridge University
- Last FC: 15 September 1970 Somerset v Yorkshire
- LA debut: 30 April 1966 Somerset v Sussex
- Last LA: 13 September 1970 Somerset v Yorkshire

Umpiring information
- Tests umpired: 2 (1992–1993)
- ODIs umpired: 8 (1983–1995)
- WTests umpired: 1 (2006)
- WT20Is umpired: 1 (2004)

Career statistics
Competition	First-class	List A
Matches	74	43
Runs scored	1,037	198
Batting average	13.29	8.25
100s/50s	0/1	0/0
Top score	84	26
Balls bowled	10,183	2,209
Wickets	172	67
Bowling average	31.62	22.31
5 wickets in innings	4	1
10 wickets in match	0	0
Best bowling	6/45	5/18
Catches/stumpings	25/–	7/–
- Source: CricketArchive, 20 June 2010

Roy Palmer (born 12 July 1942) is a former cricketer who had a relatively short first-class career as a player with Somerset from 1965 to 1970 and a much longer career as a first-class umpire. He also officiated in two Test matches in 1992 and 1993 and in eight One Day International games between 1983 and 1995.

== Cricket player ==
Palmer is the younger brother of the Somerset and England all-rounder Ken Palmer and, like him, a right-handed batsman and a fast-medium right-arm bowler. Unlike Ken, Roy Palmer's batting was normally no better than lower-order, and though he made 84 batting at No 9 against Leicestershire in 1967, he never again passed 50. His bowling, too, was inclined to be expensive. His best season was 1969, when Somerset finished bottom of the County Championship: handed the new ball for much of the season, he took 60 wickets, but at a cost of almost 32 runs per wicket. When, in 1970, that average moved upwards to beyond 37 runs per wicket, he was not re-engaged.

== Cricket umpire ==
Palmer followed his brother onto the first-class umpires list with a few matches in 1979, and was appointed to the regular first-class umpires' list for the 1980 season. He stayed there for 28 seasons, retiring at the end of the 2007 season, having reached the age of 65 and having officiated in 445 first-class games as well as 469 List A matches.

Palmer's first international appearances came during the 1983 Cricket World Cup, when he umpired four games. In 1992, he was appointed to his first Test match, the third match in the series between England and Pakistan at Old Trafford. At the end of the fourth day, he warned the Pakistan fast bowler Aaqib Javed for intimidatory bowling against the England tail-ender, Devon Malcolm. Palmer then returned Aaqib's sweater to the bowler at the end of the over with what Wisden Cricketers' Almanack termed "more emphasis than usual, probably because it was caught in his belt". Aaqib and Pakistan captain Javed Miandad protested, and a supporter ran onto the pitch with a rolled-up newspaper, and was restrained by security staff. Match referee Conrad Hunte ruled in favour of Palmer, fined Aaqib half his match fee and censured Pakistan tour manager Intikhab Alam, who had told the press that Palmer had insulted his team. The International Cricket Council also censured Intikhab for repeating his remarks and refusing to apologise to Palmer.

Palmer's second Test as an umpire was only a little less controversial. Appointed to stand in the third match of the 1993 series against Australia, he and fellow umpire Barrie Meyer both complained to the match referee, Clive Lloyd, at the end of the third day about the ferocity of the appeals. The Australians were severely censured by Lloyd. The match ended in a draw, ending a long sequence of defeats for England.

Palmer officiated in One Day International matches in the following two seasons, but did not stand in another Test, though he was the third umpire for the Lord's Test against New Zealand in 1994. He also umpired the women's Test match against India in 2006.

== See also ==
- List of Test cricket umpires
- List of One Day International cricket umpires
