= Ken Palmer =

English cricketer and umpire (1937–2024)

Ken Palmer MBE
Personal information
- Full name: Kenneth Ernest Palmer
- Born: 22 April 1937; Winchester, Hampshire, England
- Died: 23 July 2024 (aged 87); Taunton, Somerset, England
- Batting: Right-handed
- Bowling: Right-arm fast-medium
- Role: Bowling all-rounder
- Relatives: Roy Palmer (brother); Gary Palmer (son)

International information
- National side: England
- Only Test (cap 427): 12 February 1965 v South Africa

Domestic team information
- Years: Team
- 1955–1969: Somerset

Umpiring information
- Tests umpired: 22 (1978–1994)
- ODIs umpired: 23 (1977–2001)

Career statistics
Competition	Test	FC	LA
Matches	1	314	24
Runs scored	10	7,771	137
Batting average	10.00	20.72	9.78
100s/50s	0/0	2/27	0/0
Top score	10	125*	35
Balls bowled	378	44,302	1,335
Wickets	1	866	34
Bowling average	189.00	21.34	21.55
5 wickets in innings	0	47	0
10 wickets in match	0	5	0
Best bowling	1/113	9/57	4/26
Catches/stumpings	0/–	158/–	6/–
- Source: CricketArchive, 15 October 2009

Kenneth Ernest Palmer MBE (22 April 1937 – 23 July 2024) was an English cricketer and umpire, who played in one Test match in 1965, and umpired 22 Tests and 23 One Day Internationals from 1977 to 2001. He was born in Winchester, Hampshire.

== Playing career ==
A reliable all-rounder for Somerset between 1955 and 1969, Palmer was a right-handed middle-order batsman and fast-medium bowler with a whippy action, whose best season was 1961, when he achieved the double of 1,000 runs and 100 wickets.

Palmer played one Test. Because of injuries to other bowlers (John Price, David Brown and Tom Cartwright), he was called up while coaching in Johannesburg to play in the fifth Test at Port Elizabeth, on the 1964-65 England tour of South Africa.

== Umpiring ==
Palmer was appointed an umpire in 1972, and made his international debut in the England versus Pakistan Test in June 1978.

== Recognition ==
Palmer was appointed Member of the Order of the British Empire (MBE) in the 2003 New Year Honours for services to cricket.

== Personal life and death ==
His brother, Roy Palmer, also played for Somerset, and similarly became a first-class and Test match umpire. Ken's son Gary also played as an all-rounder for Somerset.

Palmer died of complications following a fall in Taunton, Somerset, on 23 July 2024, at the age of 87.

== See also ==
- List of Test cricket umpires
- List of One Day International cricket umpires
