= Adam Hollioake =

English cricket player (born 1971)

Personal information
- Full name: Adam John Hollioake
- Born: 5 September 1971 (age 55); Melbourne, Australia
- Batting: Right-handed
- Bowling: Right arm medium
- Role: All-rounder
- Relatives: Ben Hollioake (brother)

International information
- National side: England
- Test debut (cap 587): 7 August 1997 v Australia
- Last Test: 9 February 1998 v West Indies
- ODI debut (cap 143): 31 August 1996 v Pakistan
- Last ODI: 30 May 1999 v India

Domestic team information
- Years: Team
- 1992–2004: Surrey
- 2007: Essex

Career statistics
Competition	Test	ODI	FC	LA
Matches	4	35	173	284
Runs scored	65	606	9,376	5,984
Batting average	10.83	25.25	38.74	28.09
100s/50s	0/0	0/3	18/55	2/30
Top score	45	83*	208	117*
Balls bowled	144	1,208	8,808	9,074
Wickets	2	32	120	352
Bowling average	33.50	31.84	41.05	23.25
5 wickets in innings	0	0	1	7
10 wickets in match	0	0	0	0
Best bowling	2/31	4/23	5/62	6/17
Catches/stumpings	4/–	13/–	157/–	87/–
- Source: ESPNcricinfo, 6 July 2009

Adam John Hollioake (born 5 September 1971) is a former cricketer who represented England and is now a cricket coach. He has also competed as a professional boxer and had one fight as a mixed martial artist. Hollioake is currently head coach at Kent County Cricket Club.

As a player, he was an all-rounder who played for Surrey and England. He captained Surrey from 1997 until 2003, winning three County Championships, and led England in One Day Internationals. He was named one of the Wisden Cricketers of the Year in 2003. His brother, Ben, also played for England.

Since retiring from cricket in 2004, Hollioake has spent his time involved in charitable and media work as well as owning a property development business. He moved to Perth, Western Australia and later to Queensland. His property company, the Hollioake Group, collapsed in 2010. As a cricket coach he has worked with Pakistan, England Lions, Queensland and Surrey.

== Early life ==
Hollioake was born in Melbourne in 1971 and grew up in the mining town of Ballarat, where his family had lived for five generations. His father, an engineer, had played cricket for local teams, but Hollioake showed a preference for Australian Rules Football while attending St Patrick's College, Ballarat. The family moved to England in 1983 for 2 years where Hollioake attended St George's College in Weybridge. He then moved to Hong Kong for 3 years, and then back to Australia, where he attended Wesley College, where his brother Ben later studied.

== Cricketing career ==
Although born in Australia, both Adam and brother Ben learned their cricket at the Hong Kong Cricket Club Junior Gappers during the time their father John was working in Hong Kong and at Wesley College in Perth. Hollioake was offered a contract by Surrey in 1989 and made his first-class debut for the county in August 1993. He was awarded his county cap in 1995, during a season in which he scored 1099 runs and took 21 wickets. He was described as an all-rounder with "aggressive batting and inventive medium-pace allsorts" and began to share captaincy duties for Surrey with Alec Stewart in 1996. He captained Surrey from 1997 until 2003, and led them to victory in the County Championship in 1999, 2000 and 2002. He went on to claim 9 trophies in his time as Surrey captain making him one of the most successful 1st class captains of all time.

Hollioake made his England debut in two One Day International matches against Pakistan in August 1996. He led the England A team on their tour of Australia in 1996–97 and was man of the series in the home One Day International series against Australia in May 1997, scoring the winning runs in all three games. He made his test debut, playing alongside his brother Ben, against Australia in August 1997, scoring 45 runs in the first innings and taking two wickets.

Although his test career lasted only four matches in 1997 and at the beginning of 1998, Hollioake achieved greater success in One Day Internationals, playing in 35 matches from 1996 to 1999. He captained the team to victory in the 1997 Sharjah Cup, England's first tournament success for ten years. Injuries and a loss of form saw him lose the captaincy after 14 matches.

After 173 first-classes matches for Surrey, Hollioake retired from cricket at the end of the 2004 season. He made an appearance in the 2005 Asian tsunami appeal charity match, taking a hat-trick, and made a brief return to Twenty20 cricket in 2007, playing in eight matches for Essex.

== Charity work ==
Following the death of his brother and Surrey and England teammate, Ben, in a car accident in 2002, Hollioake and his family established the Ben Hollioake Fund to raise funds for CHASE hospice care for children. In 2003 he undertook 'The Journey', walking from Edinburgh to Brighton, then sailing the English channel to Dieppe, riding from Dieppe to Gibraltar and finally rowing from Gibraltar to Tangiers. The journey took over 2 months and raised several hundred thousand pounds for the Chase Charity.

In 2004 Hollioake's charity broke the world record for the number of participants in a continuous 100-metre relay. Other fundraising projects Hollioake has been involved in include Cricket Challenge, which raises money for the Queensland-based charity Paradise Kids, where members of the public compete against stars and cricketing legends, and the Battle of the Stars charity golf day.

== Media work ==
Hollioake made several appearances on the BBC programme A Question of Sport and Sky Sports Cricket AM, as well as appearing on programmes such as the 2004 Test the Nation quiz. In 2005, Hollioake took part in a revived Superstars programme on BBC television, finishing fourth in the competition behind skier Alain Baxter, Olympic athlete Du'aine Ladejo and rower Steve Williams. In 2007 Hollioake and Ladejo formed Quiet Storm Productions, which owned the television show Australia's Greatest Athlete.

== Business career ==
Hollioake and other members of his family owned an Australia-based property company, the Hollioake Group, which collapsed with debts of around A$20 million and was liquidated in September 2010. Following a long-running legal case, during which Hollioake and his father were sued by businessman Martin Ryman, Hollioake was declared bankrupt in 2011.

== Coaching career ==
Hollioake coached the Hong Kong national cricket team at the 2000 ACC Trophy.

In 2017, Hollioake coached Afghan Twenty20 team Boost Defenders, who played in the Shpageeza Cricket League. Around this time, he was also involved with the England Lions including working as a fielding coach. He was hired by Queensland Cricket for the 2018–19 season to work with their pathways cricketers and later as a batting coach.

In November 2023, he was appointed batting coach for the Pakistan national team for their tour of Australia. He returned to Surrey in 2024 in a role as assistant coach.

Hollioake was appointed as Kent head coach on a three-year contract in December 2024.

== Boxing and MMA career ==
On 13 April 2012, he had his pro boxing debut against Leigh Blacka (2 2 0) at the Tattersalls Club, Brisbane. He knocked Blacka down in the first and third rounds, and won the bout via a TKO in the 4th round.

Later that month he revealed that he would also be fighting as a mixed martial artist in Queensland, Australia in the light heavyweight division. Hollioake made his MMA debut in the Days of Glory promotion on 5 May 2012. The fight was resulted in a majority draw (with one judge favouring Hollioake), with Hollioake undecided about whether he would continue his MMA career in the future.

On 1 September 2012, Hollioake defeated Warren Tresidder in the modified style of MMA which will eliminate the use of knee strikes, elbows strikes and kicks but allows limited ground fighting.

Hollioake went back to boxing and on 6 October he fought Shane Wood (0 1 0) at the Matrix Boxing Gym, Southport. He lost this 4 round contest by a unanimous decision, all 3 judges scoring the bout 40 – 36 in favour of Wood.

For his next fight on 12 July 2013, Hollioake had a rematch against Warren Tresidder, but this time in a 6-round contest under the laws of boxing. It was staged at Southport Sharks AFL Club and it was to be Tresidders boxing debut. The result was the same as the MMA contest, with Hollioake's hand being raised in victory by split decision. The 3 judge's scorecards were 58–56, 57–58, 58–56.

After over an 18-month break, Hollioake's next fight was 28 March 2015. He fought Monty Betham Jnr (6 1 0) at the Horncastle Arena, Christchurch. This 4 round contest was a loss by way of TKO in the last round.

Then for his last fight on 19 September 2015, Hollioake went up against Mark Scheide and won by unanimous decision.

=== MMA record ===
Professional record breakdown
1 match	0 wins	0 losses
By knockout	0	0
By submission	0	0
By decision	0	0
Draws	1	
No contests	0	

Res.	Record	Opponent	Method	Event	Date	Round	Time	Location	Notes
Draw	0–0–1	Joel Millar	Draw (Majority)	Glory 2 – The Struggle Within	5 May 2012	3	5:00		
