= 1997 NatWest Trophy =

Cricket tournament

- Administrator: England and Wales Cricket Board
- Cricket format: Limited overs cricket (60 overs per innings)
- Tournament format: Knockout
- Champions: Essex (2nd title)
- Participants: 32
- Matches: 30
- Most runs: 333 Stuart Law (Essex)
- Most wickets: 15 Allan Donald (Warwickshire)

The 1997 NatWest Trophy was the 17th NatWest Trophy. It was an English limited overs county cricket tournament which was held between 24 June and 7 September 1997. The tournament was won by Essex County Cricket Club who defeated Warwickshire County Cricket Club by 9 wickets in the final at Lord's.

== Format and highlights ==
The 18 first-class counties, were joined by eleven Minor Counties: Bedfordshire, Berkshire, Buckinghamshire, Cambridgeshire, Cumberland, Devon, Herefordshire, Lincolnshire, Norfolk, Shropshire and Staffordshire.

The Ireland, Scotland and Netherlands teams also participated. There was some controversy in the semi-final at the County Ground, Chelmsford, when in a tense contest Mark Ilott of Essex and Robert Croft of Glamorgan had an on-field confrontation.

The final at Lord's which was held on 7 September 1997 and was won by Essex with Stuart Law scoring 80 and collecting the Man of the Match medal.

=== First round ===
24 June 1997
(scorecard)

Essex; 327/7 (60 overs)	v	Buckinghamshire; 238/7 (60 overs)
Nasser Hussain 78; Keith Arthurton 4/53 (12 overs)		Neil Burns 51; Paul Grayson 3/40 (11 overs)

Essex won by 89 runs
Wilton Park, Beaconsfield
Umpires: Tony Clarkson & John Hampshire
Player of the match: Robert Rollins (Essex)

24 June 1997
(scorecard)

Hampshire; 321/4 (60 overs)	v	Cambridgeshire; 82 all out (32.2 overs)
Robin Smith 126; Dominic Ralfs 2/69 (12 overs)		Dominic Ralfs 14*; John Stephenson 5/34 (11.2 overs)

Hampshire won by 239 runs
Wisbech Cricket Club Ground, Wisbech
Umpires: Mark Benson & Bob White
Player of the match: Robin Smith (Hampshire)

24 June 1997
(scorecard)

Northamptonshire; 223 all out (56.4 overs)	v	Cumberland; 187/9 (60 overs)
Tony Penberthy 57; David Pennett 3/42 (9.4 overs)		Andrew Mawson 77; Tony Penberthy 5/56 (11 overs)

Northamptonshire won by 36 runs
Riverside Ground, Chester-le-Street
Umpires: Michael Johnson & Barrie Leadbeater
Player of the match: Tony Penberthy (Northamptonshire)

24 June 1997
(scorecard)

Leicestershire; 225/8 (60 overs)	v	Devon; 172/9 (60 overs)
Iain Sutcliffe 103*; Peter Roebuck 2/27 (12 overs)		Gareth Townsend 37; Tim Mason 3/29 (12 overs)

Leicestershire won by 53 runs
The Maer Ground, Exmouth
Umpires: Neil Mallender & George Sharp
Player of the match: Iain Sutcliffe (Leicestershire)

24 June 1997
(scorecard)

Bedfordshire; 179/9 (60 overs)	v	Glamorgan; 182/3 (30.2 overs)
Barry Young 30*; Steve Watkin 3/23 (11 overs)		Robert Croft 64; Richard Dalton 3/32 (6 overs)

Glamorgan won by 7 wickets
Sophia Gardens, Cardiff
Umpires: Nigel Cowley & Vanburn Holder
Player of the match: Robert Croft (Glamorgan)

24 June 1997
(scorecard)

Gloucestershire; 351/2 (60 overs)	v	Scotland; 250/9 (60 overs)
Tony Wright 177; Greig Williamson 1/28 (4 overs)		Bruce Patterson 77; Tim Hancock 6/58 (12 overs)

Gloucestershire won by 101 runs
The Royal & Sun Alliance County Ground, Bristol
Umpires: John Holder & Martin Reed
Player of the match: Tony Wright (Gloucestershire)

24 June 1997
(scorecard)

Lancashire; 351/7 (60 overs)	v	Berkshire; 182/5 (60 overs)
Graham Lloyd 96; Jamie Sylvester 2/59 (9 overs)		James Hodgson 53*; Gary Yates 2/15 (12 overs)

Lancashire won by 169 runs
Old Trafford, Manchester
Umpires: Dickie Bird & Alan Whitehead
Player of the match: Mark Harvey (Lancashire)

24 June 1997
(scorecard)

Lincolnshire; 116 all out (50.2 overs)	v	Derbyshire; 121/2 (19 overs)
Mark Gouldstone 37; Paul Aldred 4/30 (10.2 overs)		Chris Adams 71*; Stephen Bradford 1/18 (4 overs)

Derbyshire won by 8 wickets
Lindum Sports Club Ground, Lincoln
Umpires: Paul Adams & Nigel Plews
Player of the match: Chris Adams (Derbyshire)

24 June 1997
(scorecard)

Kent; 225 all out (59.5 overs)	v	Middlesex; 227/7 (59.2 overs)
Nigel Llong 68; Richard Johnson 5/50 (12 overs)		Mark Ramprakash 72; Dean Headley 3/31 (12 overs)

Middlesex won by 3 wickets
Lord's, London
Umpires: Graham Burgess & Barrie Meyer
Player of the match: Mark Ramprakash (Middlesex)

24 June 1997
(scorecard)

Staffordshire; 95 all out (45.3 overs)	v	Nottinghamshire; 96/0 (31.5 overs)
Laurie Potter 19; Nathan Astle 3/20 (10 overs)		Paul Pollard 42*

Nottinghamshire won by 10 wickets
Trent Bridge, Nottingham
Umpires: Chris Balderstone & Mervyn Kitchen
Player of the match: Nathan Astle (Nottinghamshire)

24 June 1997
(scorecard)

Somerset; 367/5 (60 overs)	v	Herefordshire; 136 all out (37.4 overs)
Simon Ecclestone 101 (62); Neal Radford 2/64 (12 overs)		Robert Hall 29 (43); Mushtaq Ahmed 4/27 (12 overs)

Somerset won by 231 runs
County Ground, Taunton
Umpires: David Constant & Kevin Lyons
Player of the match: Simon Ecclestone (Somerset)

24 June 1997
(scorecard)

Durham; 247/7 (60 overs)	v	Surrey; 251/5 (48.5 overs)
John Morris 75 (114); Ian Salisbury 3/36 (12 overs)		Alec Stewart 90* (118); Michael Foster 2/37 (8 overs)

Surrey won by 5 wickets
The Oval, London
Umpires: Trevor Jesty & Roy Palmer
Player of the match: Alec Stewart (Surrey)

24 June 1997
(scorecard)

Shropshire; 116 all out (47.5 overs)	v	Sussex; 119/0 (45.4 overs)
Andy Johnson 15; James Kirtley 5/39 (12 overs)		Keith Greenfield 89*

Sussex won by 10 wickets
County Ground, Hove
Umpires: Ray Julian & Jeremy Lloyds
Player of the match: James Kirtley (Sussex)

24 June 1997
(scorecard)

Warwickshire; 207 all out (59.3 overs)	v	Norfolk; 127 all out (48.2 overs)
Ashley Giles 69; Paul Newman 4/23 (12 overs)		Steve Goldsmith 22; Ashley Giles 5/21 (12 overs)

Warwickshire won by 80 runs
Edgbaston, Birmingham
Umpires: John Harris & Allan Jones
Player of the match: Ashley Giles (Warwickshire)

24 June 1997
(scorecard)

Worcestershire; 336/6 (60 overs)	v	Netherlands; 225 all out (54.2 overs)
Tom Moody 108 (145); Murray Goodwin 1/28 (5 overs)		Bas Zuiderent 99 (141); Graeme Hick 2/14 (4.2 overs)

Worcestershire won by 111 runs
New Road, Worcester
Umpires: John Steele & Peter Willey
Player of the match: Bas Zuiderent (Netherlands)

24 June 1997
(scorecard)

Yorkshire; 249 all out (59.4 overs)	v	Ireland; 53 all out (18.5 overs)
Peter Hartley 83; Paul McCrum 3/26 (12 overs)		Derek Heasley 18; Darren Gough 7/27 (9.5 overs)

Yorkshire won by 196 runs
Headingley, Leeds
Umpires: Jack Bond & Pasty Harris
Player of the match: Darren Gough (Yorkshire)

=== Second round ===
9 July 1997
(scorecard)

Derbyshire; 324/7 (60 overs)	v	Northamptonshire; 180 all out (48.1 overs)
Kim Barnett 111; Rob Bailey 3/55 (9 overs)		Tony Penberthy 62; Devon Malcolm 7/35 (10.1 overs)

Derbyshire won by 144 runs
County Ground, Derby
Umpires: Tony Clarkson & John Holder
Player of the match: Devon Malcolm (Derbyshire)

9 July 1997
(scorecard)

Worcestershire; 286/9 (60 overs)	v	Essex; 287/3 (57.3 overs)
Graeme Hick 146; Ashley Cowan 2/50 (12 overs)		Stuart Law 100; Phil Newport 1/32 (6 overs)

Essex won by 7 wickets
County Ground, Chelmsford
Umpires: Barrie Leadbeater & Bob White
Player of the match: Ronnie Irani (Essex)

9 July 1997
(scorecard)

Hampshire; 302/6 (60 overs)	v	Glamorgan; 304/8 (59.4 overs)
Robin Smith 119; Darren Thomas 2/70 (11 overs)		Adrian Dale 71; John Stephenson 3/49 (12 overs)

Glamorgan won by 2 wickets
County Ground, Southampton
Umpires: Ray Julian & Barrie Meyer
Player of the match: Steve James (Glamorgan)

9 July 1997
(scorecard)

Yorkshire; 310/5 (60 overs)	v	Leicestershire; 182 all out (47.2 overs)
Craig White 96*; Gordon Parsons 3/68 (12 overs)		Iain Sutcliffe 90; Richard Stemp 4/54 (12 overs)

Yorkshire won by 128 runs
Grace Road, Leicester
Umpires: Allan Jones & Alan Whitehead
Player of the match: Craig White (Yorkshire)

9 July 1997
(scorecard)

Gloucestershire; 277/9 (60 overs)	v	Middlesex; 280/6 (59.3 overs)
Monte Lynch 100; Jacques Kallis 4/47 (11 overs)		Jacques Kallis 100; Mark Alleyne 3/47 (12 overs)

Middlesex won by 4 wickets
Uxbridge Cricket Club Ground, Uxbridge
Umpires: Ken Palmer & Roy Palmer
Player of the match: Jacques Kallis (Middlesex)

9 July 1997
(scorecard)

Nottinghamshire; 176 all out (55.1 overs)	v	Surrey; 154 all out (55.5 overs)
Nathan Astle 56; Saqlain Mushtaq 3/30 (8.1 overs)		Mark Butcher 35; Chris Tolley 3/21 (9 overs)

Nottinghamshire won by 22 runs
The Oval, London
Umpires: Barry Dudleston & Trevor Jesty
Player of the match: Nathan Astle (Nottinghamshire)

9 July 1997
(scorecard)

Lancashire; 283/6 (60 overs)	v	Sussex; 286/3 (56.3 overs)
John Crawley 113*; Vasbert Drakes 2/35 (12 overs)		Keith Greenfield 129; Ian Austin 4/45 (11 overs)

Sussex won by 7 wickets
County Ground, Hove
Umpires: John Harris & John Steele
Player of the match: Keith Greenfield (Sussex)

9 July 1997
(scorecard)

Warwickshire; 220 all out (58.1 overs)	v	Somerset; 209 all out (58.3 overs)
Dominic Ostler 54; Keith Parsons 3/34 (11 overs)		Simon Ecclestone 87; Allan Donald 4/54 (12 overs)

Warwickshire won by 11 runs
Edgbaston, Birmingham
Umpires: Nigel Plews & David Shepherd
Player of the match: Simon Ecclestone (Somerset)

=== Quarter-finals ===
29 July 1997
(scorecard)

Derbyshire; 327/8 (60 overs)	v	Sussex; 329/5 (59.2 overs)
Chris Adams 129*; Vasbert Drakes 4/62 (12 overs)		Rajesh Rao 158; Devon Malcolm 1/33 (6 overs)

Sussex won by 5 wickets
County Ground, Derby
Umpires: Dickie Bird & George Sharp
Player of the match: Rajesh Rao (Sussex)

29 July 1997
(scorecard)

Yorkshire; 236/8 (60 overs)	v	Glamorgan; 237/9 (59 overs)
Darren Lehmann 105; Dean Cosker 3/26 (12 overs)		Matthew Maynard 62; Darren Gough 4/36 (12 overs)

Glamorgan won by 1 wicket
Sophia Gardens, Cardiff
Umpires: Barry Dudleston & Trevor Jesty
Player of the match: Waqar Younis (Glamorgan)

29 July 1997
(scorecard)

Warwickshire; 286/6 (60 overs)	v	Middlesex; 258/9 (60 overs)
David Hemp 112; Angus Fraser 1/31 (12 overs)		Mark Ramprakash 98; Ashley Giles 3/49 (12 overs)

Warwickshire won by 28 runs
Lord's, London
Umpires: Graham Burgess & David Shepherd
Player of the match: David Hemp (Warwickshire)

29 July 1997
(scorecard)

Nottinghamshire; 288/5 (60 overs)	v	Essex; 289/7 (58.2 overs)
Paul Johnson 106; Stuart Law 2/54 (8 overs)		Nasser Hussain 89*; Paul Franks 3/80 (12 overs)

Essex won by 3 wickets
Trent Bridge, Nottingham
Umpires: Jack Bond & Vanburn Holder
Player of the match: Nasser Hussain (Essex)

=== Semi-finals ===
12, 13 August 1997
(scorecard)

Glamorgan; 301/8 (60 overs)	v	Essex; 303/9 (55 overs)
Steve James 109; Paul Grayson 2/51 (9 overs)		Stuart Law 90; Darren Thomas 5/74 (12 overs)

Essex won by 1 wicket
County Ground, Chelmsford
Umpires: Chris Balderstone & David Constant
Player of the match: Stuart Law (Essex)

- Match was scheduled for one day but extended to two.

13, 14 August 1997
(scorecard)

Warwickshire; 342/3 (60 overs)	v	Sussex; 237 all out (53.1 overs)
David Hemp 111*; Vasbert Drakes 2/38 (12 overs)		Mark Newell 79; Allan Donald 5/37 (10.1 overs)

Warwickshire won by 105 runs
Edgbaston, Birmingham
Umpires: John Hampshire & Ken Palmer
Player of the match: David Hemp (Warwickshire)

- Match was scheduled for one day but extended to two.

=== Final ===
7 September 1997
(scorecard)

Warwickshire; 170/8 (60 overs)	v	Essex; 171/1 (26.3 overs)
Dougie Brown 37 (62); Ashley Cowan 3/29 (12 overs)		Stuart Law 80* (71); Allan Donald 1/36 (6 overs)

Essex won by 9 wickets
Lord's, London
Umpires: Mervyn Kitchen & Peter Willey
Player of the match: Stuart Law (Essex)
