= Mark Gouldstone =

English cricketer (born 1963)

Personal information
- Full name: Mark Roger Gouldstone
- Born: 3 February 1963 (age 63); Bishop's Stortford, Hertfordshire, England
- Batting: Right-handed
- Bowling: Right-arm medium

Domestic team information
- Years: Team
- 1984: Hertfordshire
- 1986–1988: Northamptonshire
- 1988: Hertfordshire
- 1989–1992: Bedfordshire
- 1993–1994: Hertfordshire
- 1995–1998: Lincolnshire

Career statistics
Competition	First-class	List A
Matches	8	11
Runs scored	274	157
Batting average	22.83	17.44
100s/50s	0/2	0/1
Top score	71	68*
Catches/stumpings	4/–	3/–
- Source: Cricinfo, 12 July 2011

Mark Roger Gouldstone (born 2 February 1963) is a former English cricketer. Gouldstone was a right-handed batsman who bowled right-arm medium pace. He was born in Bishop's Stortford, Hertfordshire.

Gouldstone made his debut in county cricket for Hertfordshire in the 1984 Minor Counties Championship against Suffolk, having previously played for the Essex Second XI. He made a further appearance for his native county in that year's competition, against Norfolk. Having joined Northamptonshire in 1984 and spending a couple of seasons in their Second XI, he went on to make his first-class debut for the county against the touring New Zealanders in 1986. He made 7 further first-class appearances for Northamptonshire in 1988, the last of which came against Derbyshire in the 1988 County Championship. In his 8 first-class appearances for the county, he scored 274 runs at a batting average of 22.83, with a high score of 77. This score, one of 2 first-class fifties he made, came against Essex in 1988. It was in 1986 that he made his List A debut for Northamptonshire against Leicestershire in the John Player Special League. He made 6 further List A appearances for Northamptonshire, the last of which came against Derbyshire in the 1988 Refuge Assurance League. In his 7 List A matches for the county, he scored 38 runs at an average of 6.33, with a high score of 11.

With opportunities limited at Northamptonshire, he appeared in an MCCA Knockout Trophy fixture for Hertfordshire against Oxfordshire in 1988, before joining Bedfordshire the following season, who he played Minor counties cricket for on a handful of occasions from 1989 to 1992. He appeared once in List A cricket for Bedfordshire, against Worcestershire in the 1991 NatWest Trophy, a match in which he was dismissed for 2 by Neal Radford. He rejoined his native county of Hertfordshire in 1993, making 18 further Minor Counties Championship appearances and 5 further MCCA Knockout Trophy appearances, spread over the 1993 and 1994 seasons. He also appeared once in List A cricket for Hertfordshire, which came in the 1993 NatWest Trophy against Gloucestershire. He scored 68 not out in this game, but could not prevent Gloucestershire winning by 110 runs.

Joining Lincolnshire in 1995, Gouldstone made his debut for the county against Hertfordshire in the Minor Counties Championship. He played Minor counties cricket for Lincolnshire from 1995 to 1998, making 17 Minor Counties Championship appearances and 8 MCCA Knockout Trophy appearances. He made his final 2 List A appearances for Lincolnshire. The first of these came against Gloucestershire in the 1996 NatWest Trophy, with him scoring 12 runs in this match, before being dismissed by Courtney Walsh. The second of these came in the 1997 NatWest Trophy against Derbyshire. He top scored with 37 in Lincolnshire's innings, before being dismissed by Paul Aldred, in a match which Derbyshire won by 8 wickets.
