= Giles Ecclestone =

English cricketer (born 1968)

Personal information
- Full name: Giles William Ecclestone
- Born: 17 October 1968 (age 58); Lambeth, London, England
- Batting: Left-handed
- Bowling: Right-arm medium
- Relatives: Simon Ecclestone (brother)

Domestic team information
- Years: Team
- 2002–2004: Cambridgeshire
- 1999–2001: Essex Cricket Board
- 1997: Minor Counties
- 1992/1993: Natal Country Districts
- 1989–1997: Cambridgeshire

Career statistics
Competition	LA
Matches	13
Runs scored	270
Batting average	20.76
100s/50s	–/2
Top score	92
Balls bowled	180
Wickets	4
Bowling average	39.25
5 wickets in innings	–
10 wickets in match	–
Best bowling	4/43
Catches/stumpings	9/–
- Source: Cricinfo, 7 November 2010

Giles William Ecclestone (born 17 October 1968) is an English cricketer. Ecclestone is a left-handed batsman who bowls right-arm medium pace. He was born in Lambeth, London.

Ecclestone made his debut for Cambridgeshire in the 1989 Minor Counties Championship against Suffolk. From 1989 to 1996, he represented the county in 41 Championship matches, following those up 6 years later with his final Championship appearance for Cambridgeshire against Bedfordshire. Ecclestone played in the MCCA Knockout Trophy for Cambridgeshire, making his debut in that competition against Suffolk in 1989. From 1989 to 1997, he played 17 Trophy matches. He followed that up during his second stint with the county by playing 5 more from 2002 to 2004, the last of which came against Cumberland.

It was for Cambridgeshire that Ecclestone made his debut in List A cricket against Northamptonshire in the 1992 NatWest Trophy. Following the 1992 season, he played a single List A match in South Africa for Natal Country Districts against Orange Free State. For Cambridgeshire, he played a further 4 List A matches during his first stint with the county, the last of which came against Hampshire in the 1997 NatWest Trophy. Ecclestone made his only appearance for a combined Minor Counties team in a List A match against Lancashire in the 1997 Benson and Hedges Cup.

In 1999, he made his debut for the Essex Cricket Board against Ireland in the 1999 NatWest Trophy. From 1999 to 2001, he represented the Board in 6 List A matches, the last of which came against the Sussex Cricket Board in the 1st round of the 2002 Cheltenham & Gloucester Trophy which was played in 2001. Ecclestone played a further List A match, which came during his second stint with Cambridgeshire when they played the Middlesex Cricket Board in the 2nd round of the 2003 Cheltenham & Gloucester Trophy which was played in 2002. Ecclestone played a total of 13 List A matches, during which he scored 270 runs at a batting average of 20.76, with 2 half centuries and a high score of 92. In the field he took 9 catches, while with the ball he took 4 wickets at a bowling average of 39.25, with best figures of 4/43.

He currently plays club cricket for Saffron Walden Cricket Club in the East Anglian Premier League. In February 2020, he was named in England's squad for the Over-50s Cricket World Cup in South Africa. However, the tournament was cancelled during the third round of matches due to the coronavirus pandemic.

== Family ==
His brother, Simon, played first-class cricket for Oxford University and Somerset, as well as List A and Minor counties cricket for Cambridgeshire. He has a wife and 3 children, two daughters and one son.
