= Andrew Mawson (cricketer) =

English cricketer (born 1974)

Personal information
- Full name: Andrew David Mawson
- Born: 27 October 1974 (age 52); Workington, Cumberland, England
- Batting: Right-handed
- Bowling: Leg break
- Role: Occasional wicket-keeper

Domestic team information
- Years: Team
- 2002–present: Suffolk
- 1995–1999: Cumberland

Career statistics
Competition	List A
Matches	6
Runs scored	189
Batting average	31.50
100s/50s	–/2
Top score	77
Balls bowled	–
Wickets	–
Bowling average	–
5 wickets in innings	–
10 wickets in match	–
Best bowling	–
Catches/stumpings	1/–
- Source: Cricinfo, 4 July 2011

Andrew David Mawson (born 27 October 1974) is an English cricketer. Mawson is a right-handed batsman who bowls leg break, and who occasionally plays as a wicket-keeper. He was born in Workington, Cumberland.

Mawson made his debut for Cumberland in the 1995 Minor Counties Championship against Norfolk. Mawson played Minor counties cricket for Shropshire from 1995 to 1999, which included 26 Minor Counties Championship appearances and 7 MCCA Knockout Trophy appearances. He made his List A debut against Middlesex in the 1996 NatWest Trophy. He made 2 further List A appearances for Cumberland, against Northamptonshire in 1997 NatWest Trophy and Derbyshire in the 1998 NatWest Trophy. In his 3 List A matches, he scored 122 runs at an average of 40.66, with a high score of 77. This score came against Northamptonshire in 1997.

He later moved to Suffolk in 2002, making his debut for the county in the 2002 MCCA Knockout Trophy against Bedfordshire. Mawson has played Minor counties cricket for Suffolk from 2002 to present, making 25 Minor Counties Championship appearances and 23 MCCA Knockout Trophy appearances. He made his first List A appearance for the county against Buckinghamshire in the 1st round of the 2003 Cheltenham & Gloucester Trophy, which was played in 2002. He made 2 further List A appearances for the county, against Devon in the 1st round of the 2004 Cheltenham & Gloucester Trophy which was held in 2003, and Glamorgan in the 1st round of the 2005 Cheltenham & Gloucester Trophy. In his 3 List A matches for Suffolk, he scored 67 runs at an average of 22.33, with a high score of 65. This came against Buckinghamshire in the 2003 Cheltenham & Gloucester Trophy.
