= James Hodgson (cricketer, born 1972) =

English cricketer (born 1972)

Personal information
- Full name: James Hodgson
- Born: 28 March 1972 (age 54); Reading, Berkshire, England
- Batting: Right-handed
- Bowling: Leg break

Domestic team information
- Years: Team
- 1993–1998: Berkshire
- 2000–2002: Kent Cricket Board

Career statistics
Competition	List A
Matches	3
Runs scored	104
Batting average	104.00
100s/50s	–/1
Top score	53*
Catches/stumpings	1/–
- Source: Cricinfo, 23 September 2010

James Hodgson (born 28 March 1972) is a former English cricketer. Hodgson was a right-handed batsman who bowled leg break. He was born at Reading, Berkshire.

After representing England Schools, Hodgson toured New Zealand with England Under 19 team in 1991, playing in one Youth ODI. Hodgson went on to play for Nottinghamshire County Cricket Club 2nd XI with limited success.

Hodgson made his Minor Counties Championship debut for Berkshire in 1993 against Oxfordshire. From 1993 to 1998, he represented the county in 33 Minor Counties Championship matches, the last of which came in the 1998 Championship when Berkshire played Oxfordshire. Hodgson also played in the MCCA Knockout Trophy for Berkshire. His debut in that competition came in 1994 when Berkshire played Buckinghamshire. From 1994 to 1998, he represented the county in 6 Trophy matches, the last of which came when Berkshire played the Hampshire Cricket Board in the 1998 MCCA Knockout Trophy. He also played a single List-A match for Berkshire against Lancashire in the 1997 NatWest Trophy.

In 2000, Hodgson represented the Kent Cricket Board in the 2000 MCCA Knockout Trophy, making his debut in that competition for the Board against the Surrey Cricket Board. From 2000 to 2002, he represented the Board in 6 Trophy matches, the last of which came in the 2000 MCCA Knockout Trophy when the Board played the Channel Islands. Hodgson also represented the Board in 2 List-A matches, the first of which came against Warwickshire in the 2001 Cheltenham & Gloucester Trophy His second and final List-A match for the Board came in the 2002 Cheltenham & Gloucester Trophy against Hampshire. In his 3 List-A matches, he scored 104 runs at a batting average of 104.00 (so high due to 2 not out innings), with a high score of 53*.

Additionally, in 1991 Hodgson represented the Nottinghamshire Second XI in the Second XI Championship and Second XI Trophy.

Hodgson today plays club cricket for The Mote Cricket Club, based at Mote Park, in the Kent Cricket League.
