= David Pennett =

English cricketer (born 1969)

Personal information
- Full name: David Barrington Pennett
- Born: 26 October 1969 (age 57); Leeds, Yorkshire, England
- Batting: Right-handed
- Bowling: Right-arm fast-medium

Domestic team information
- Years: Team
- 2003–2005: Cheshire
- 1998: Minor Counties
- 1997–2002: Cumberland
- 1992–1996: Nottinghamshire

Career statistics
Competition	First-class	List A
Matches	31	60
Runs scored	196	208
Batting average	9.80	14.85
100s/50s	–/1	–/1
Top score	50	51*
Balls bowled	4,623	2,689
Wickets	60	71
Bowling average	44.95	31.23
5 wickets in innings	1	–
10 wickets in match	–	–
Best bowling	5/36	4/20
Catches/stumpings	7/–	12/–
- Source: Cricinfo, 29 November 2011

David Barrington Pennett (born 26 October 1969) is a former English cricketer. Pennett was a right-handed batsman who bowled right-arm fast-medium. He was born at Leeds, Yorkshire.

== Nottinghamshire ==
Having played Second XI cricket for his native Yorkshire, Pennett was signed by Nottinghamshire for the 1992 season. It was in this season that he made his first-class debut against Cambridge University and his List A debut against Northamptonshire in the 1992 Sunday League. In first-class cricket, Pennett appeared 31 time for Nottinghamshire between 1992 and 1996. In these 31 matches, he took 60 wickets at an average of 44.95, with best figures of 5/36. These figures were his only first-class five wicket haul and came against Durham in 1993. A tailend batsman, Pennett scored 196 runs at a batting average of 9.80. His only innings of note, a score of 50, came against Durham in 1995. In List A cricket, Pennett made 42 appearances over the same period. He took a total of 44 wickets at an average of 34.18, with best figures of 3/27. With the bat, he scored just 25 runs at an average of 8.33, with a high score of 12 not out.

== Minor counties career ==
With his opportunities at Nottinghamshire becoming limited, he joined Minor county Cumberland for the 1997 season. He made his Minor Counties Championship against Bedfordshire and from 1997 to 2002, he made 38 appearances in the Minor Counties Championship, as well as sixteen MCCA Knockout Trophy appearances. He played his first List A match for the county in the 1997 NatWest Trophy against Northamptonshire. He made ten further List A appearances for Cumberland, the last of which came against Devon in the 2nd round of the 2003 Cheltenham & Gloucester Trophy, which to avoid fixture congestion was held in 2002. He took 19 wickets in his eleven List A appearances for Cumberland, which came at an average of 20.89 and with best figures of 4/20. With the bat, he scored 86 runs at an average of 14.33, with a high score of 51 not out. This score was his only half century in that format and came against Devon County Cricket Club. While playing for Cumberland, he also made five List A appearances for a Minor Counties team in the 1998 Benson and Hedges Cup, taking 5 wickets and scoring 73 runs.

He left Cumberland at the end of the 2002 season, joining Cheshire for the 2003 season, Pennett made his Minor Counties Championship debut for the county against Dorset. He played Minor counties cricket for Cheshire from 2003 to 2005, making sixteen Minor Counties Championship and two MCCA Knockout Trophy appearances. He made two List A appearances for Cheshire against Bedfordshire and Hampshire, both in the 2004 Cheltenham & Gloucester Trophy. He retired from county cricket at the end of the 2005 season.
