= Chellaston =

Village on outskirts of Derby, England

Coordinates: 52.8671°N 1.4384°W

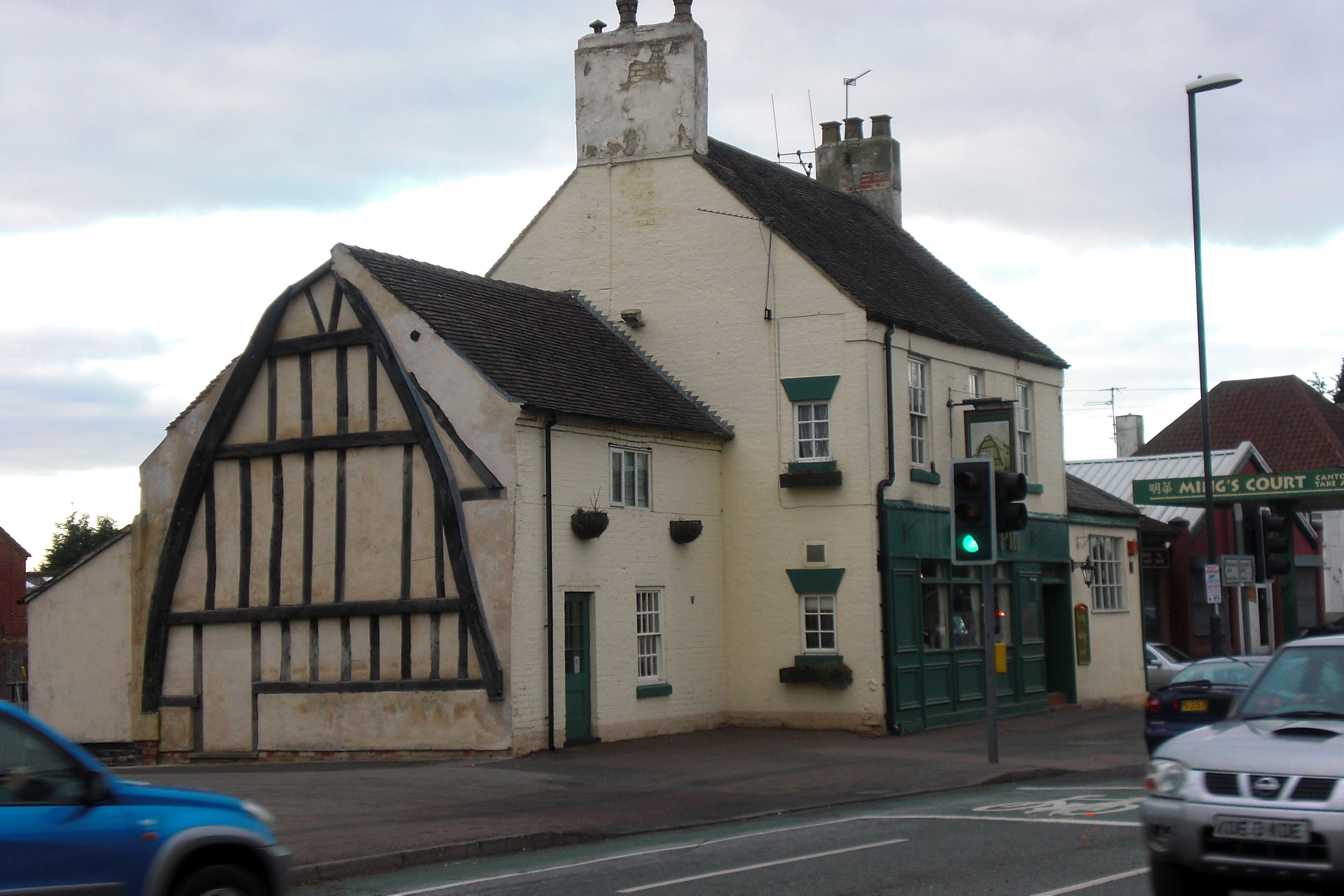
- The New Pin public house

- Location within Derbyshire
- OS grid reference: SK379301
- Unitary authority: Derby
- Ceremonial county: Derbyshire
- Region: East Midlands
- Country: England
- Sovereign state: United Kingdom
- Post town: DERBY
- Postcode district: DE73
- Dialling code: 01332
- Police: Derbyshire
- Fire: Derbyshire
- Ambulance: East Midlands
- UK Parliament: Derby South

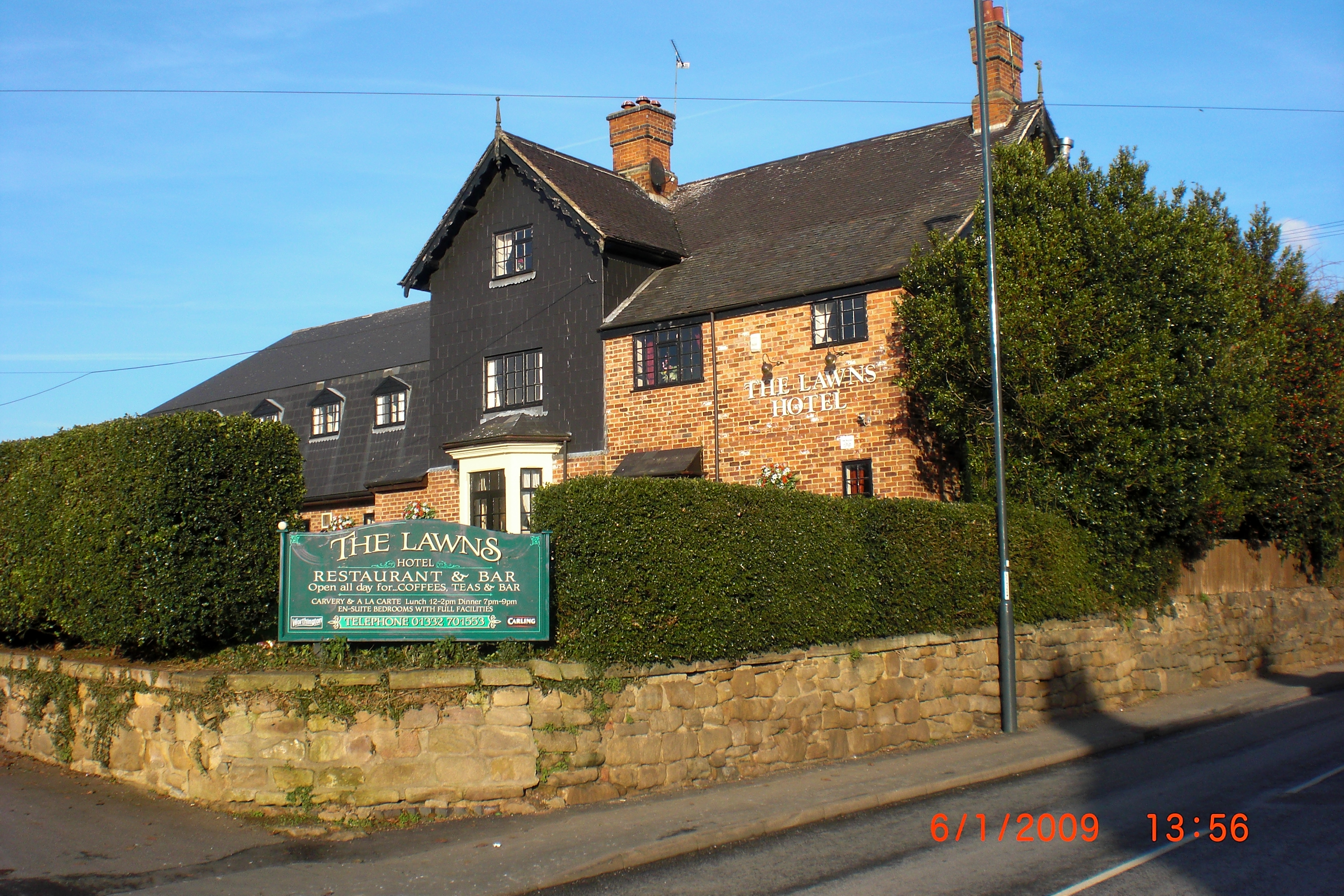
The Lawns Hotel

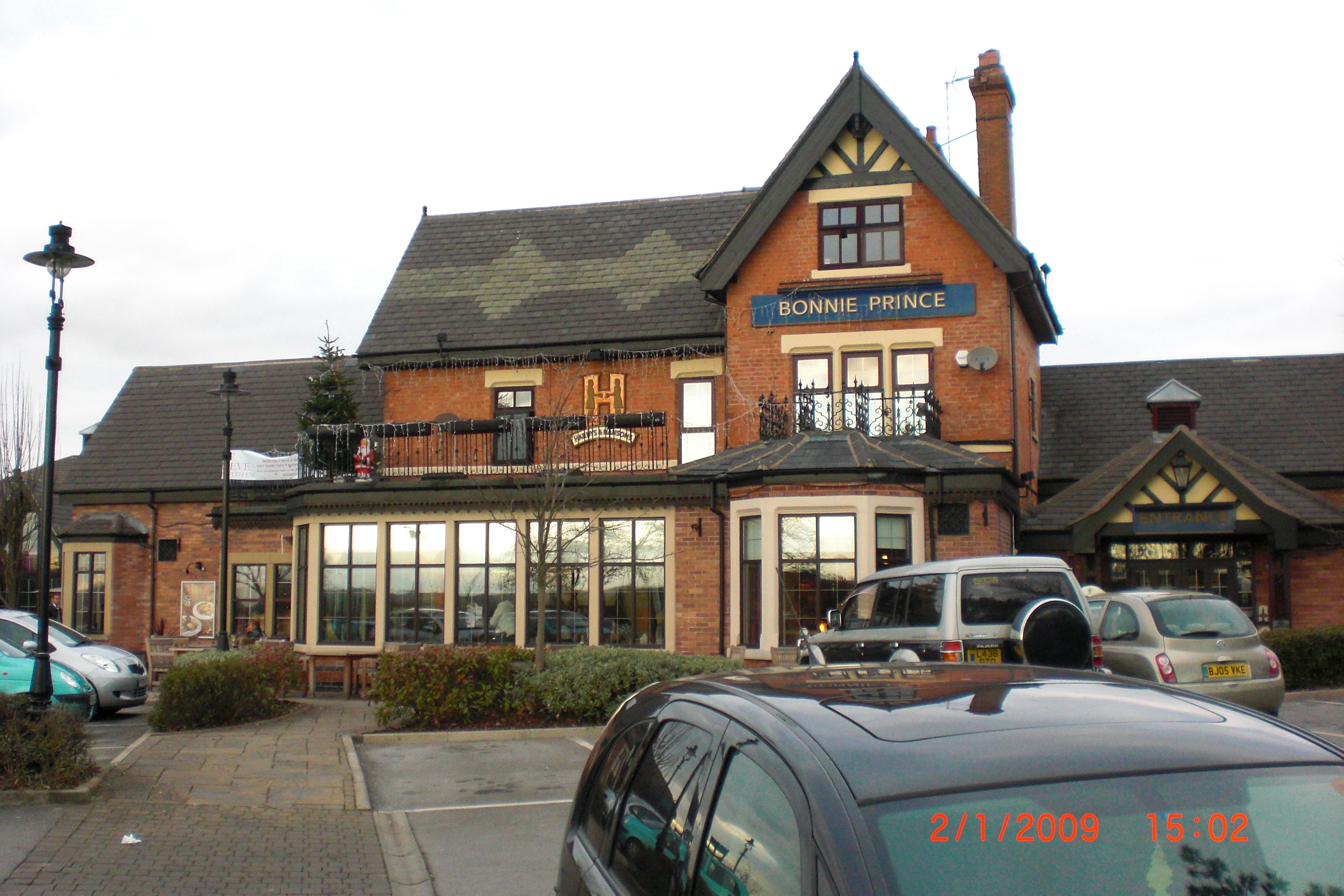
The Hickory's Smokehouse Derby restaurant

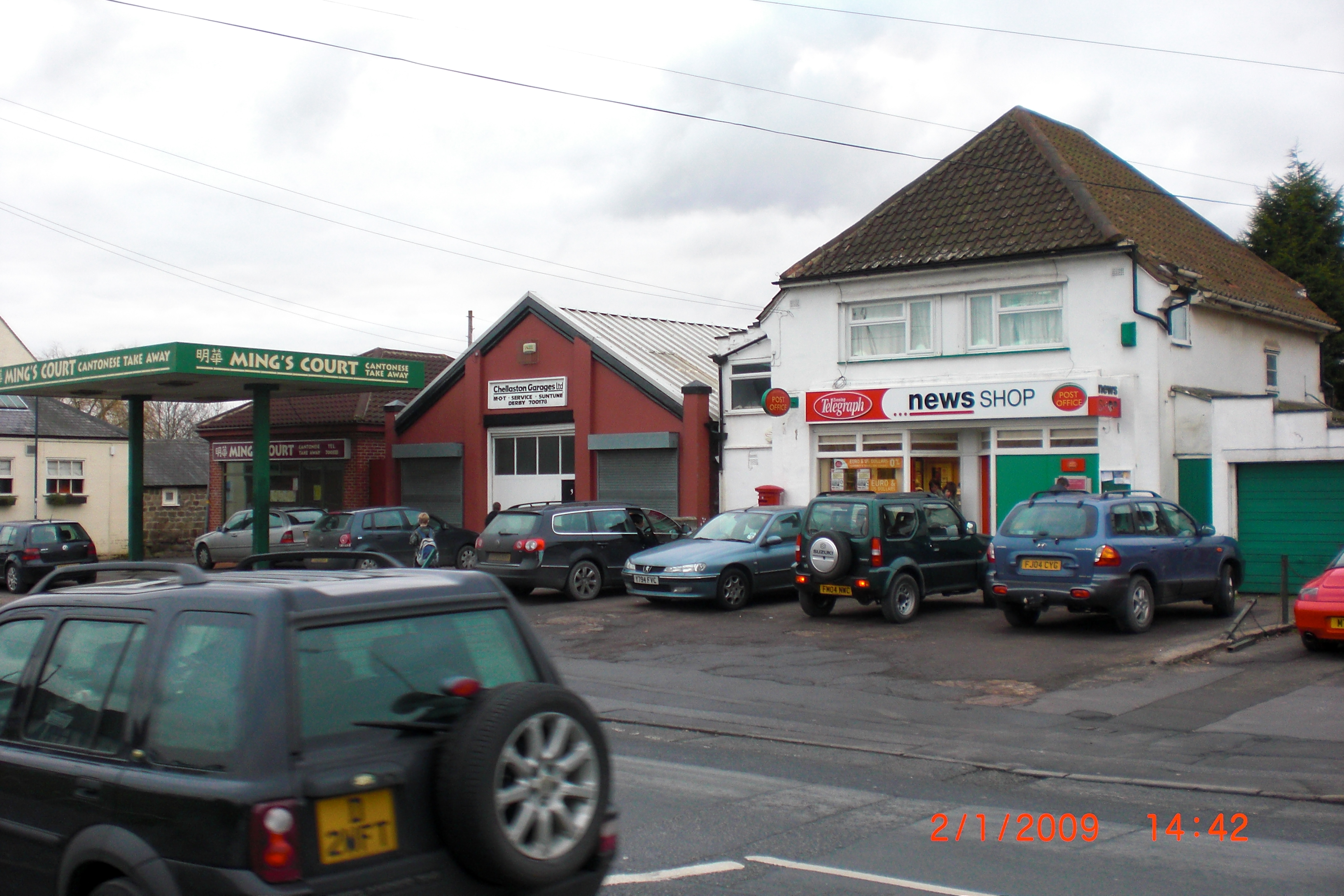
Cantonese takeaway, garage, and Post Office on Derby Road (A514)

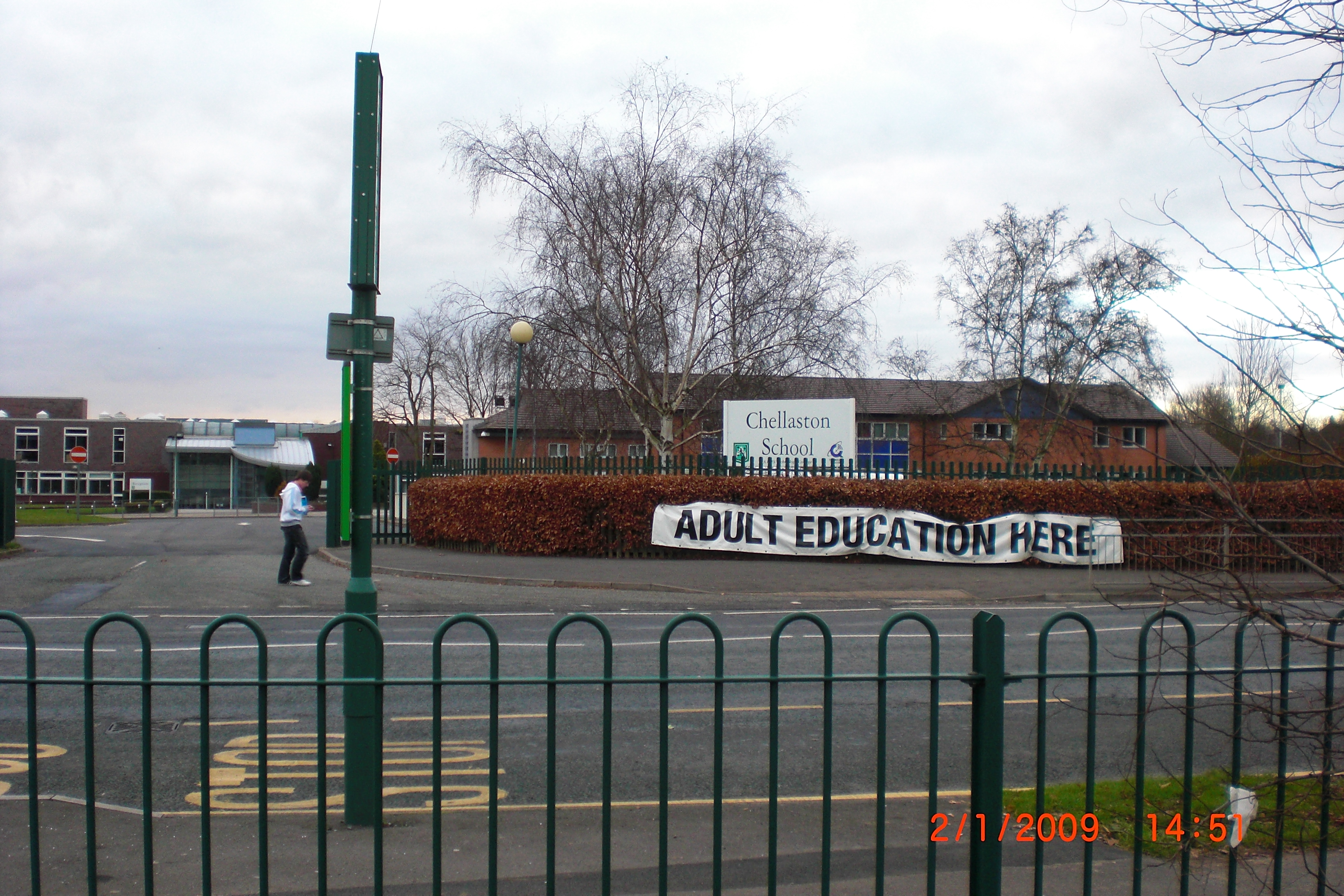
Chellaston School

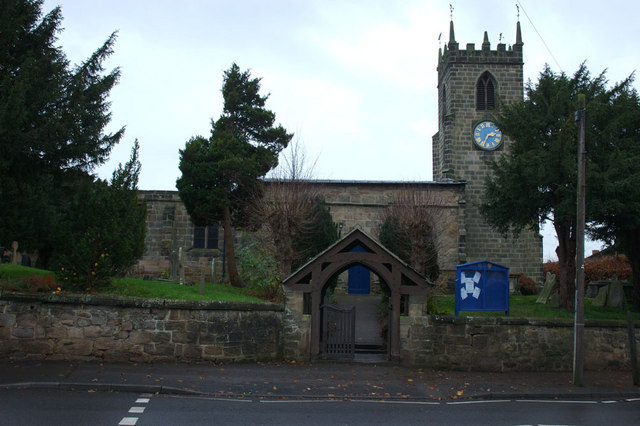
St Peter's Church

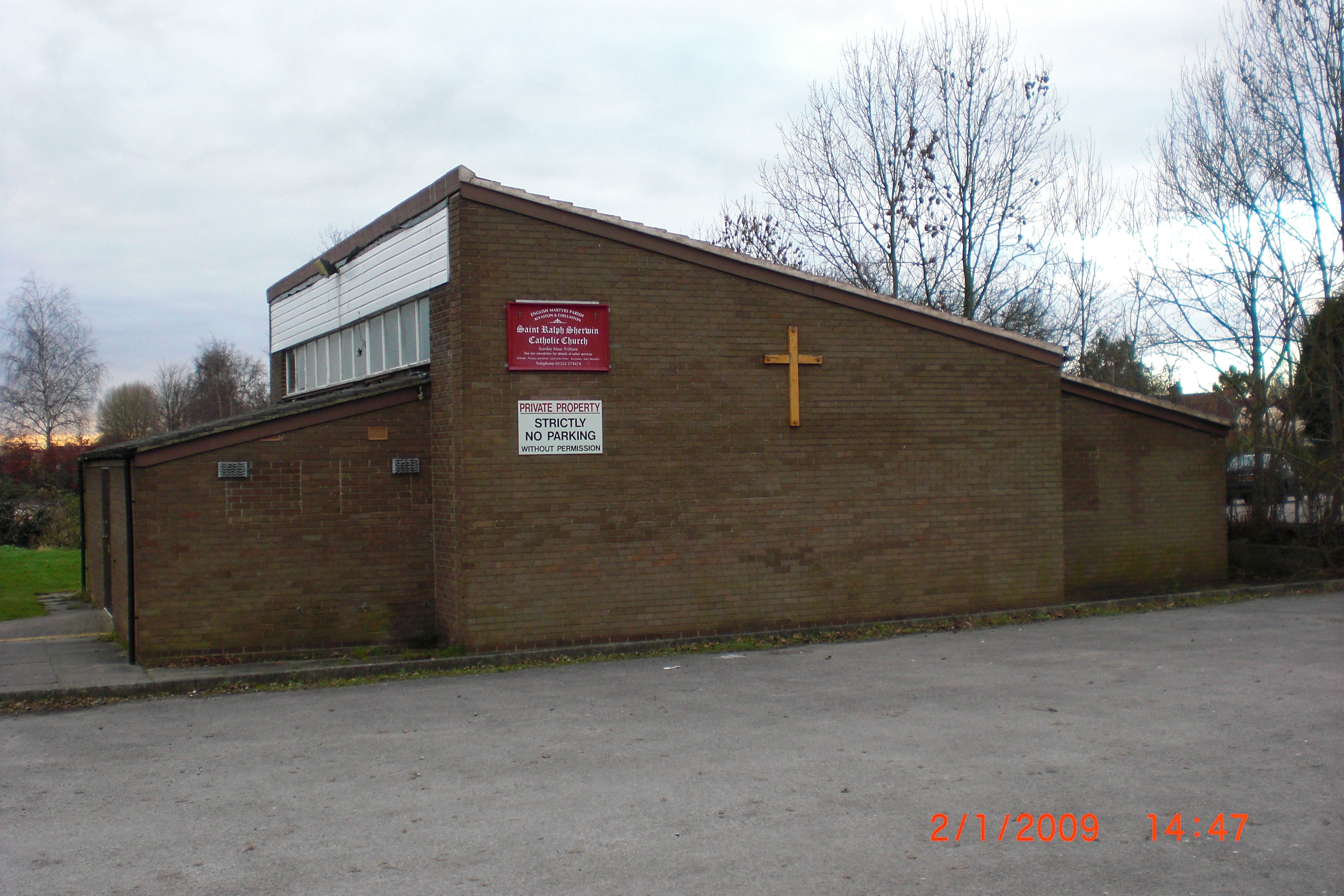
The Saint Ralph Sherwin Catholic Church (now demolished)

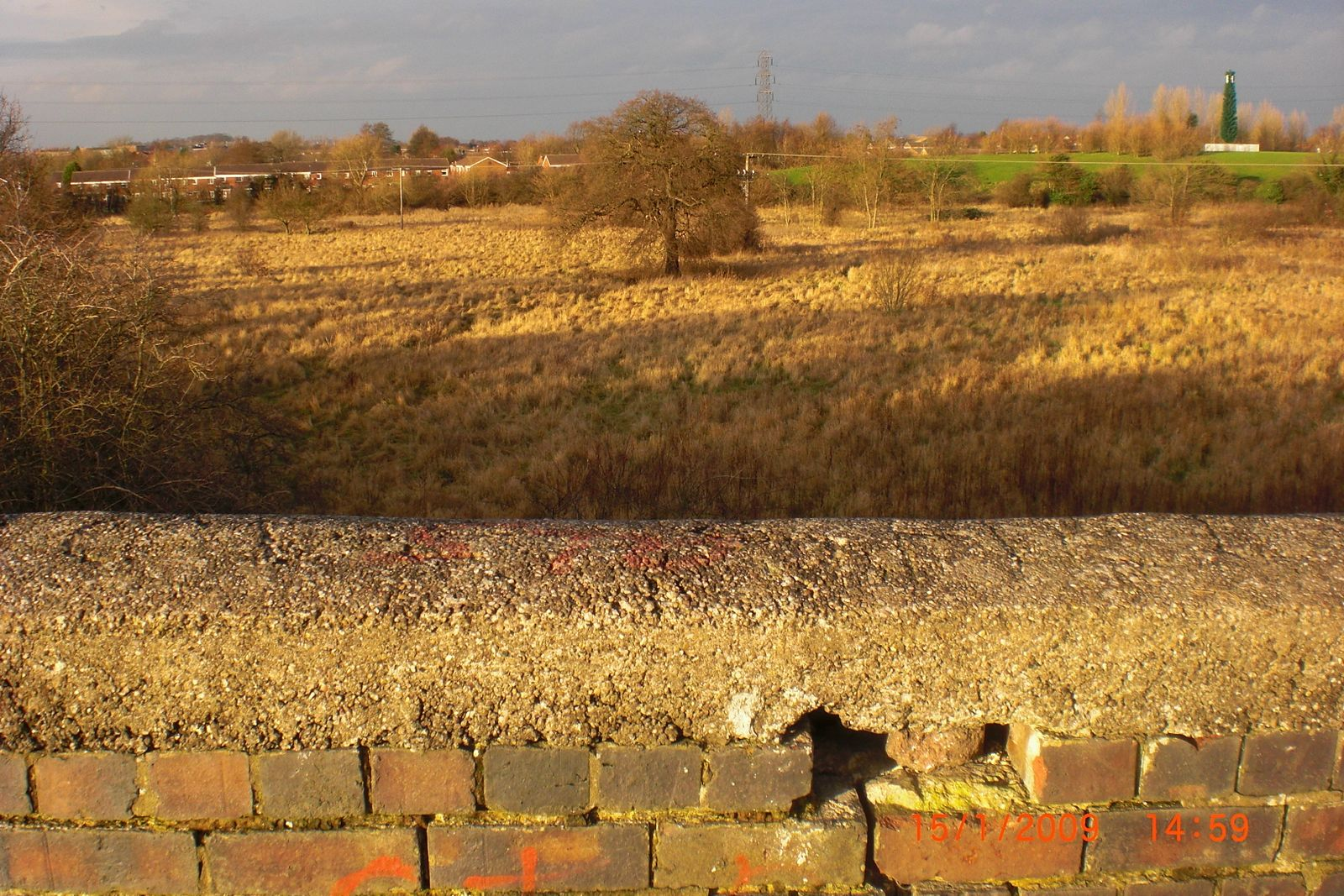
View from Sinfin Moor Lane bridge

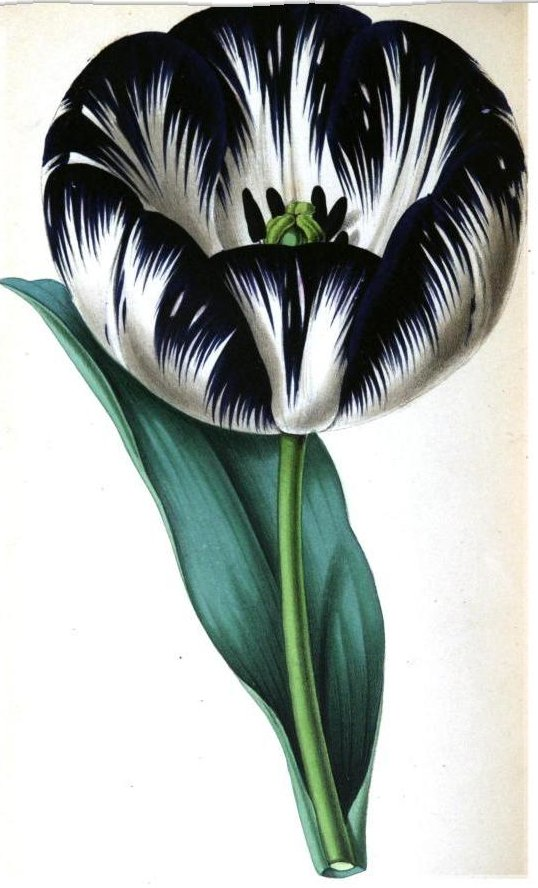
Chellaston Beauty tulip

Chellaston is a suburban village on the southern outskirts of Derby, in Derbyshire, England.

== History ==
An early mention of Chellaston is thought to be a reference to Ceolarde's hill. This is mentioned in a 1009 charter when nearby land was given to Morcar by King Æthelred the Unready. Historically, Chellaston has been part of the Hundred of Repton and Gresley.

Chellaston was a separate village and was worth three shillings when the king gave it to Henry de Ferrers in the 11th century. It is mentioned as "Celerdestune" in the Domesday Book of 1086.

Throughout the centuries, Chellaston grew slowly. By 1676, the village had grown to a population of around 140, and there were still only 42 houses in Chellaston in 1789. There may have been up to two manor houses in Chellaston, but these residences were abandoned sometime around the 17th century. One of them is thought to have been located at the end of the present-day Manor Road.

It is rumoured that Robin Hood was born at a manor house in Chellaston. This claim is mentioned in several directories and gazetteers published in the 19th century, but there is no evidence to substantiate this legend. However, Philip Marc, the local sheriff at the time of the Robin Hood legend, had real associations with Chellaston.

Chellaston was once one of the largest producers of mined alabaster in the United Kingdom, which was used to produce Nottingham Alabaster. By the end of the 18th century, Chellaston was exporting its poor grades of alabaster as gypsum and it was transported via the local canals for markets in Derby and The Potteries. It was even used by Josiah Wedgwood for plaster moulds to shape his pottery. The remains of Chellaston's pits can be found at the bottom of Pit Close Lane and Woodgate Drive, and the site is now popular with BMX bikers and teenagers.

Chellaston grew substantially between 1880 and 1950, with a number of areas being developed for housing. These developments included housing around Glenwood Road, Station Road, and north of Sutton Avenue. After 1950, the village grew even more: houses were built in the Springfield Road and St Peter's Road areas, among others. By the 1990s, extensive housing complexes had emerged, most notably on Sutton Avenue, Maple Drive, and Parkway.

As of 2009, Chellaston has become a large Derby suburb; much larger than the original village. Two distinct housing estates to the east and west of the centre have been built. The eastern estate can be found on Snelsmoor Lane, and the west estate sprawls in an arc from the Hickory's Smokehouse Derby restaurant on Swarkestone Road to the bottom of Sinfin Moor Lane and Baltimore Bridge.

== Government ==
Chellaston formerly lay within the South Derbyshire parliamentary constituency, but moved to Derby South following the electoral boundaries review of 2007. The newly formed Chellaston Fields settlement to the southern edge of Chellaston continues to fall under South Derbyshire. In local council elections, Chellaston is part of the Chellaston ward.

The current councillors for Chellaston and Shelton Lock are Conservative's Harvey Jennings and two independent candidates, husband & wife, Philip and Celia Ingall as of 6 May 2022, with Celia replacing Conservative councillor, Ross McCristal.

In 1961 the civil parish had a population of 3702. On 1 April 1968 the parish was abolished and merged with Derby, Elvaston, Aston upon Trent and Swarkestone. It is now in the unparished area of Derby, in the Derby district.

== Geography ==
Chellaston lies about 5 miles (8.0 km) south of Derby city centre, and is the southernmost part of the city. It borders Shelton Lock to the north and South Derbyshire to the south. The southern edge of Chellaston also known as Chellaston Fields, formed by Regents Place Estate and the adjacent Retail Park, falls under South Derbyshire District and isn’t part of Derby City.

== Demography ==
At the 2011 United Kingdom census the population was 15,198 - an increase of 24.95% from 2001. 86.2% are White British, compared to 75.3% for Derby as a whole.

Population of Chellaston
Year	Pop.
1676	~140
1829	~400
1835	352
1841	461
1857	499
1871	565
1881	498
1891	497
1911	795
1921	820
2001	12,163
2011	15,198

== Economy ==
Chellaston has a Lidl supermarket on Swarkestone Road. The Post Office is located on Derby Road near Station Road, next to Chellaston Garage (a small car repair business) and a Cantonese takeaway – Ming's Court (which used to be a petrol station). A Tesco Express was housed on the site next to the garage until April 2011, when it moved to new premises in the former Red Lion public house.

== Culture and community ==
In the late 2000s, a local public library was built between the community centre and the then Co-operative supermarket. There is also a children's playground next to the Chellaston Community Centre, which is situated on Barley Croft, off High Street. The bowls club can be traced back to 1905.

The 25-acre (10 ha) site of the former Chellaston Brickworks is now a designated Local Nature Reserve. Chellaston has intermittently hosted an annual summer carnival complete with floats. Floats were contributed by local groups such as the Scouts and Guides, churches of all denominations, and Chellaston Junior School. The carnival usually took place on the recreation ground, next to the community centre on Barley Croft, but has not been held since the late 1990s.

The Chellaston Beauty tulip was developed in the early 1850s; its flower has a white base and variegated tips in near black.

Before being converted into a public house (The Bonnie Prince), and then restaurant (Hickory's Smokehouse Derby), the building used to be a grand, private residence, named Home Lea, home to the Osbourne family in 1901.

== Landmarks ==
No.4 Swarkestone Road probably originates from the 16th century but has been much altered since. White House Farm on the High Street is a Grade II-listed farmhouse and stables dating from the early 18th century. Pear Tree Cottage at No.49 Derby Road has a plaque dated 1799, though this date is disputed. Opposite the church, at No.84 High Street, is the former village shop, which is Grade II-listed as it is relatively unchanged since the early 19th century.

== Transport ==
The main road through Chellaston is Derby Road A514, which becomes Swarkestone Road at the crossroads with High Street. Approximately 1000 new homes have been built to the west of Chellaston, close to the route of the disused and in-filled Derby Canal.

Formerly, the suburb had its own railway station (at the bottom of Station Road), but little trace of the site exists today. The station's full name was Chellaston and Swarkestone. The main public transport link is the bus service, which journeys either side of Chellaston as far as Derby and Swadlincote.

== Education ==
There are five schools; Chellaston Infant School on School Lane, Chellaston Junior School on Maple Drive, Homefields Primary School on Parkway and Chellaston Academy (senior school and 6th form college) on Swarkestone Road. Chellaston Academy's catchment area includes the nearby villages of Melbourne, Aston-on-Trent, Ticknall, Barrow upon Trent and Weston-on-Trent. Chellaston Fields is the fifth school, located near Aldi which is on the outskirts of the village, towards the A50 and Swarkestone.

== Religious sites ==
There are two churches in Chellaston: St. Peter's Church (Church of England) on St. Peter's Road, and the Methodist Church on High Street. St. Peter's dates from the 15th century although it was largely rebuilt in 1842. The two churches have a signed an ecumenical covenant together, and hold a joint service every month. There used to be a Baptist church in Chellaston near Pear Tree Cottage on Derby Road. There also used to be the St. Ralph Sherwin Church Catholic on Swarkestone Road next to Chellaston School, but this was demolished in 2019 along with the Rose and Crown pub to make way for a Lidl supermarket.

== Sport ==
Chellaston Park on Snelsmoor Lane includes a children's playground, football 3G floodlit courts and grass pitches, a cricket pitch and changing facilities.

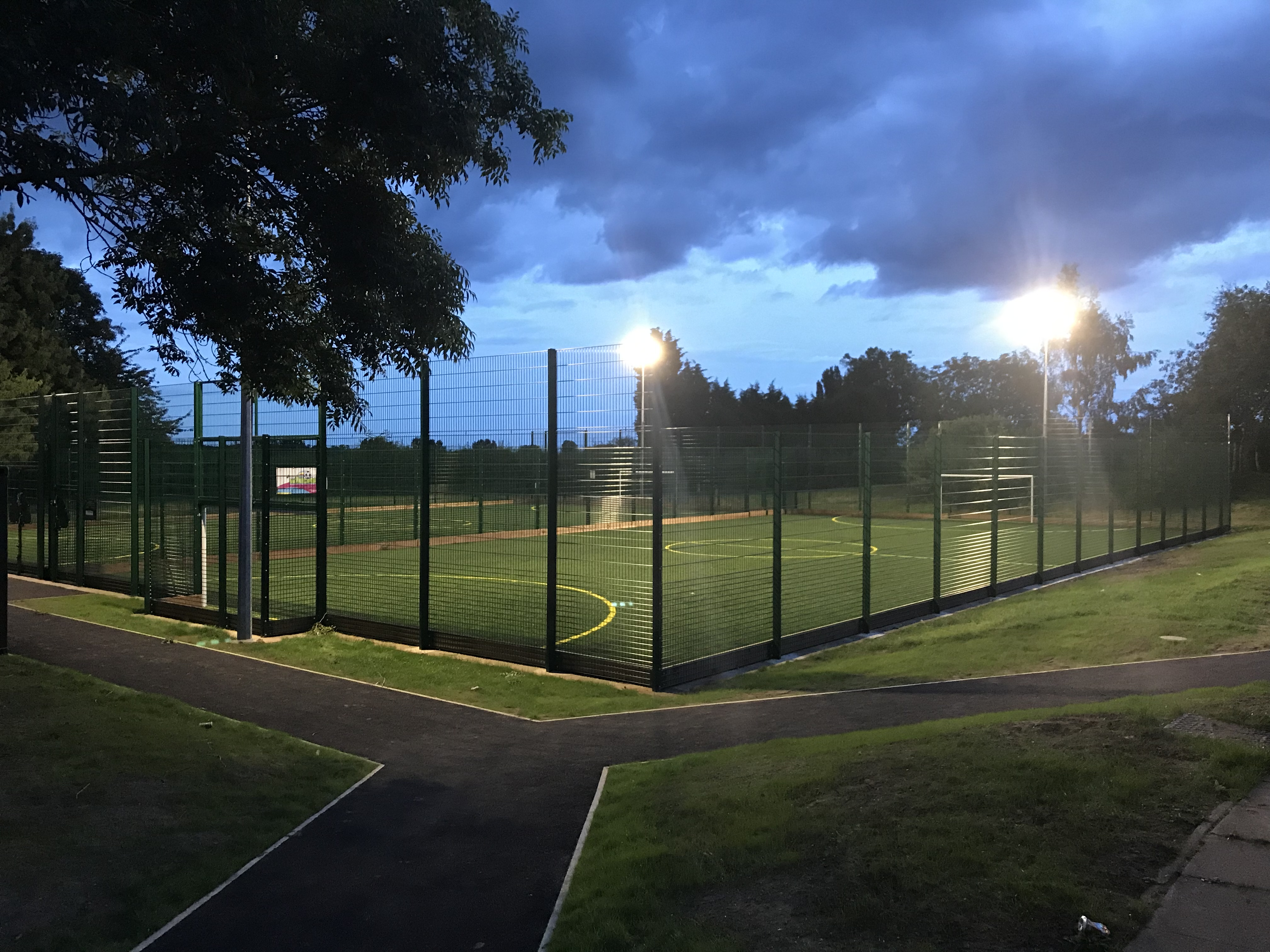

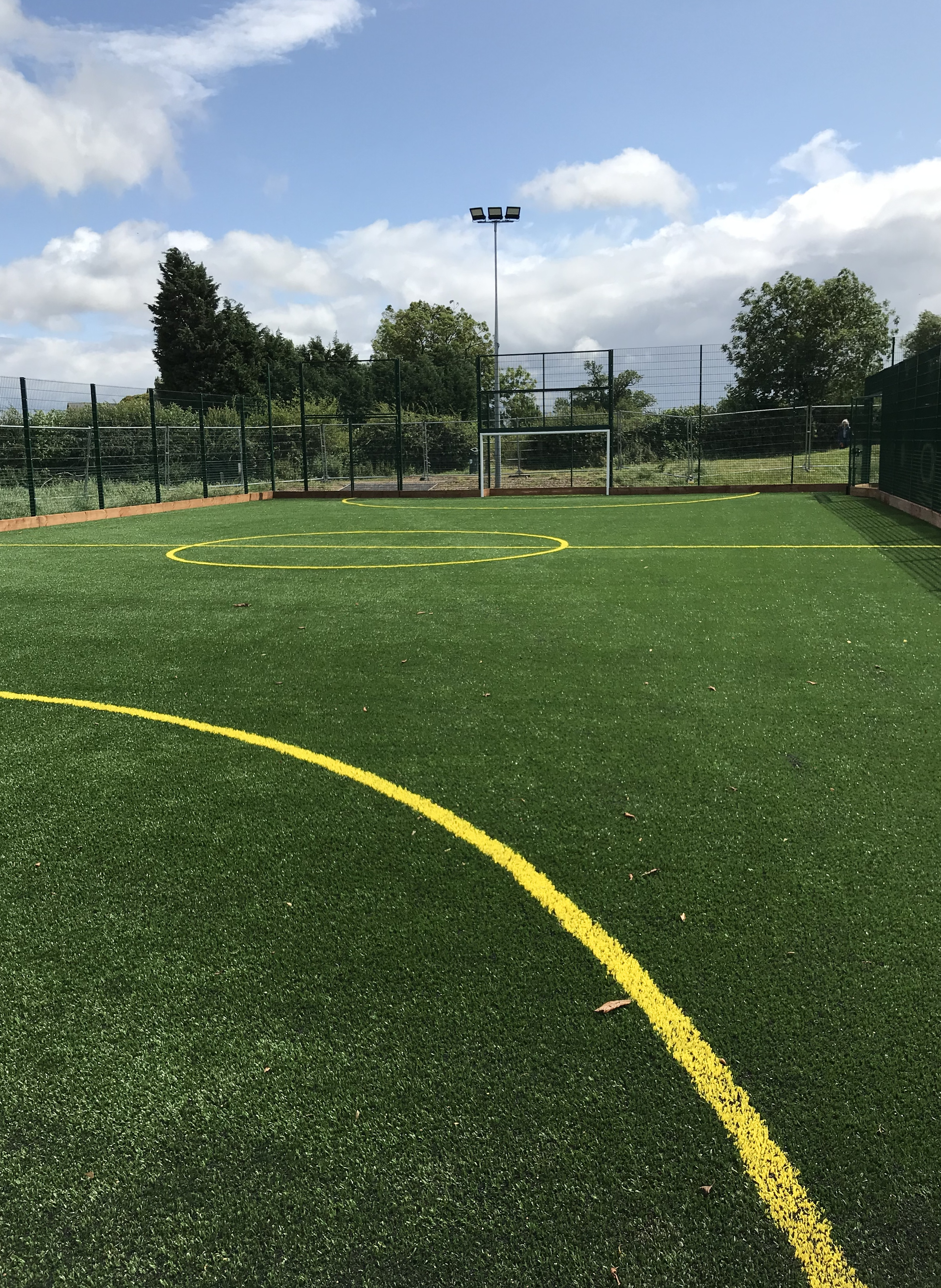

The pavilion and sporting facilities are managed by 'not for profit' organisation, Chellaston Leisure Limited.

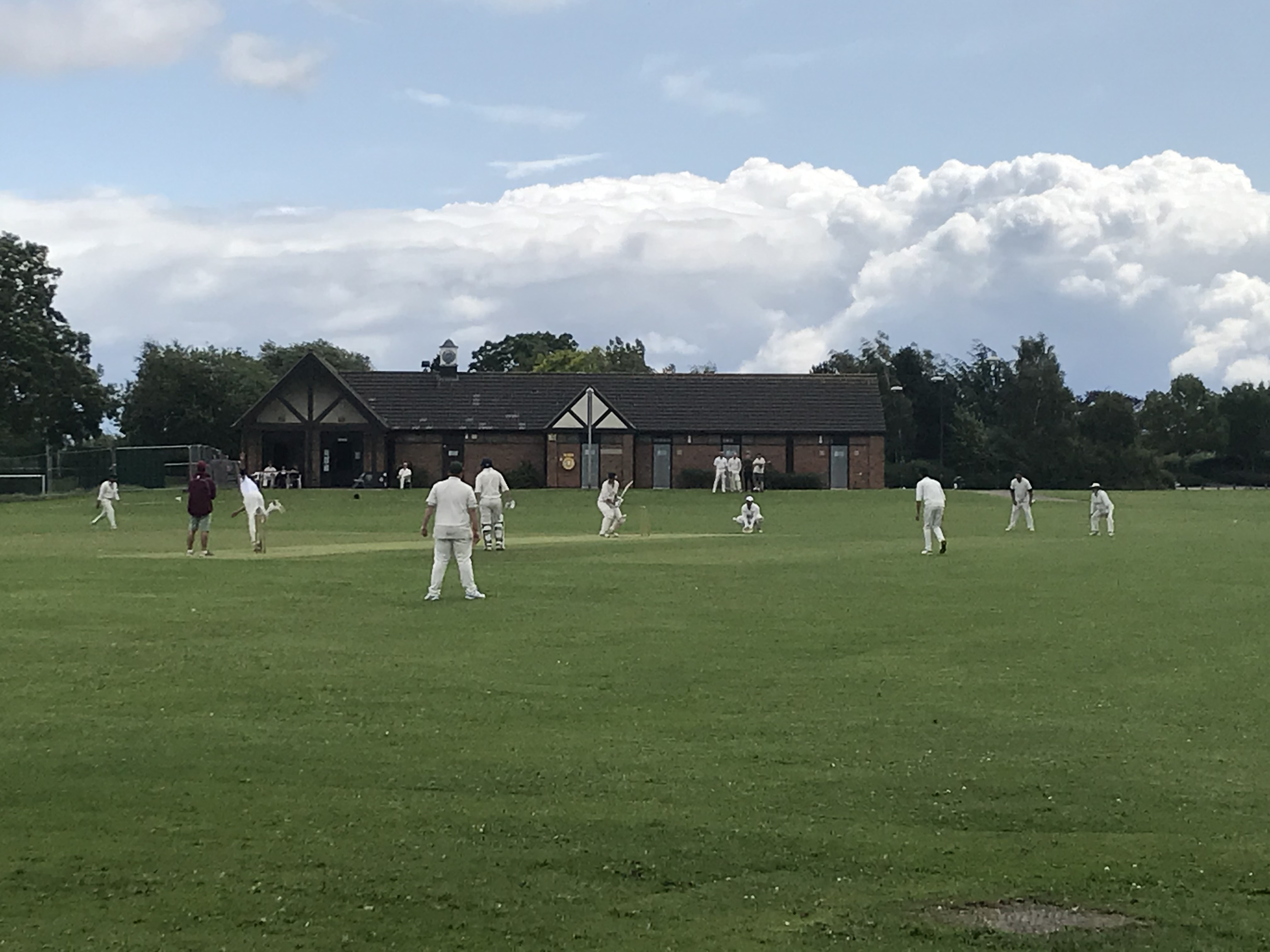

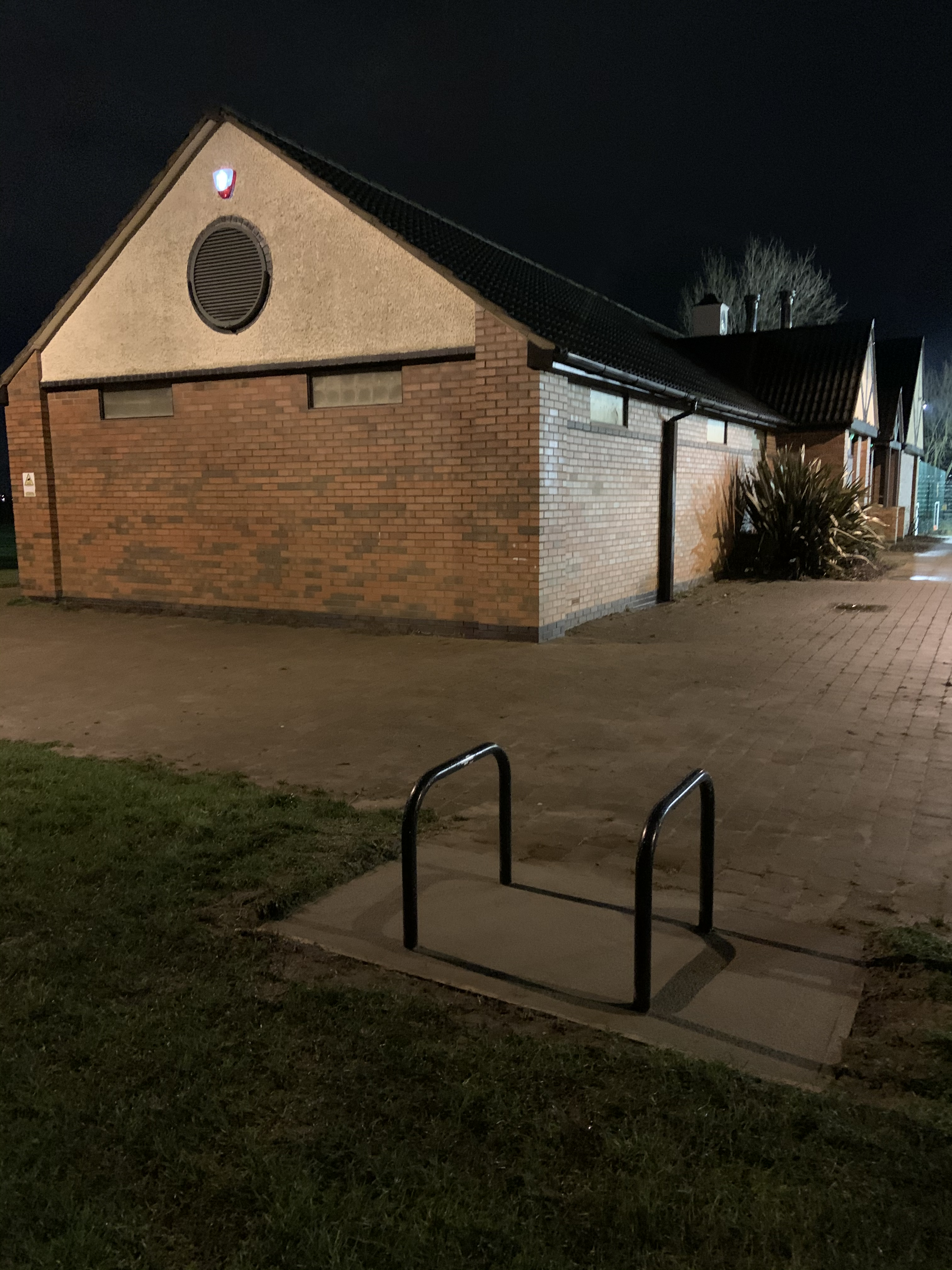

AFC Chellaston (formally Chellaston Boys & Girls FC); an FA Charter Standard Community Football Club founded in 1992. The club is based at Snelsmoor Park in Chellaston. The club, run by volunteers, has approx. 50 teams, playing in the Derby, Burton and Nottingham junior and adult football leagues. Players are aged from 3 right through to adult and there are approx. 500 registered players within the club. Chellaston Cricket Club plays in the Derbyshire County Cricket Leagues, with adult and junior teams were formed in 2021 and have adopted Chellaston Park as their home ground.

== Notable people ==
The following came from Chellaston:

- Paul Aldred (former Derbyshire cricketer)
- JTBD Platts (former Derbyshire cricketer)
- Frederick Forman (former Derbyshire cricketer)
- Georgia Groome, actress, was a member of Chellaston Players theatre group

== See also ==
- Listed buildings in Chellaston
