= Stephen Bradford =

English cricketer

Personal information
- Full name: Stephen Alvin Bradford
- Born: 15 July 1963; Lincoln, Lincolnshire
- Died: 25 August 2012 (aged 49); Lincoln, Lincolnshire
- Batting: Left-handed
- Bowling: Slow left-arm orthodox

Domestic team information
- Years: Team
- 1984–2000: Lincolnshire

Career statistics
Competition	List A
Matches	3
Runs scored	29
Batting average	14.50
100s/50s	0/0
Top score	15
Balls bowled	150
Wickets	4
Bowling average	26.00
5 wickets in innings	0
10 wickets in match	0
Best bowling	2/52
Catches/stumpings	0/–
- Source: Cricinfo, 24 June 2011

Stephen Alvin Bradford (15 July 1963 – 25 August 2012) was an English cricketer. Bradford was a left-handed batsman who bowled slow left-arm orthodox. He was born in Lincoln, Lincolnshire.

== Career ==
Bradford made his debut for Lincolnshire in the 1984 Minor Counties Championship against Staffordshire. Bradford played Minor counties cricket for Lincolnshire from 1984 to 2000, which included 87 Minor Counties Championship matches and 22 MCCA Knockout Trophy matches. He made his List A debut against Gloucestershire in the 1996 NatWest Trophy.

He played two further List A matches for Lincolnshire, against Derbyshire in the 1997 NatWest Trophy and Wales Minor Counties in the 1999 NatWest Trophy. In his three matches, he scored 29 runs at an average of 14.50, with a high score of 15 not out. With the ball, he took 4 wickets at a bowling average of 26.00, with best figures of 2/52.
