= Listed buildings in Chellaston =

Chellaston is an electoral ward in the city of Derby, England. The ward contains seven listed buildings that are recorded in the National Heritage List for England. Of these, one is listed at Grade II*, the middle of the three grades, and the others are at Grade II, the lowest grade. The ward contains a suburban village to the south of the city centre, and it is mainly residential. The listed buildings consist of a church, houses and a cottage, a farmhouse and farm buildings, and a war memorial.

== Key ==
Grade	Criteria<
II*	Particularly important buildings of more than special interest.
II	Buildings of national importance and special interest.

== Buildings ==
Name and location	Photograph	Date	Notes	Grade
St Peter's Church; 52.86958°N 1.43522°W		13th or early 14th century	The church has been altered and extended through the centuries, the tower was rebuilt in 1842, and the church was restored in 1884. It is built in stone with a slate roof, and consists of a nave, a south aisle, a chancel and a west tower. The tower has angle buttresses, a west doorway with a clock face above, single-light bell openings, and an embattled parapet with corner and central pinnacles. The chancel is in Perpendicular style.	II*
4 Swarkestone Road; 52.86837°N 1.43846°W		16th century (probable)	A timber framed house that has been much altered, the front in painted brick and with modillion eaves and tile roof. There are two storeys and a single bay. In thee ground floor is a doorway and a sash window to the right, and the upper floor contains a casement window. In the left gable end is exposed timber framing, including a cruck, and there is also exposed timber framing inside.	II
White House Farmhouse; 52.86988°N 1.43339°W	—	Early 18th century	The farmhouse is in painted red brick, with bracketed wood eaves and a slate roof. There are two storeys and three bays. The central doorway has a moulded surround, a rectangular fanlight and a canopy, and the windows are sashes.	II
Loose boxes and barn, White House Farm; 52.86990°N 1.43272°W	—	18th century (probable)	The farm buildings are in red brick with tile roofs. There are two storeys and an L-shaped plan, with two ranges at right angles.	II
Pear Tree Cottage; 52.87034°N 1.43972°W	—	1799	The cottage is in colourwashed brick, with two storeys and two bays. The central doorway has reeded pilasters and a small cornice hood. The windows are sashes with channelled lintels, and between the upper floor windows is an oval tablet with the name of the cottage and the date.	II
1a Green Avenue; 52.86987°N 1.43459°W		Early 19th century	A house and a shop on a corner site, later combined, the building is in painted brick with a dog-tooth string course between the storeys, and modillion eaves. There are two storeys, three bays on High Street, one on Green Avenue, and an angled corner between. In the corner is a doorway with a cambered head, and on each side is a shop window. On High Street is another doorway with a cambered head, and the other windows are casements, those in the ground floor with cambered heads.	II
Allenton war memorial 52.88383°N 1.44924°W		1919	The war memorial is in Hopton Wood stone, and consists of the statue of a soldier in uniform with a rifle standing in front of a rock. The statue is on a pedestal on a moulded plinth on a base of one step. The plinth has a moulded capstone and a dentilled cornice, and contains panels with pointed heads. In the panels are inscriptions and the names of those who were lost, and those who were enlisted and returned from service in the First World War.	II
