= Tim Mason (cricketer) =

English cricketer (born 1975)

Timothy Mason (born 12 April 1975) is a former English cricketer. He was a right-handed batsman and a right-arm off-break bowler.

Born in Leicester, during his ten-year career, he played extensively for his home county of Leicestershire for five years of his first-class career, before moving to Essex in 2000. He joined Shropshire in 2002, and has played in the Minor Counties Championship since then. He most recently participated in the 2006 Western Division.

Prior to his major participation in County Cricket, Tim Mason played three Youth Test matches against Sri Lanka Under-19s, throughout the month of January 1994, alongside up-and-coming names such as Michael Vaughan and Marcus Trescothick.
