= Dominic Ralfs =

English cricketer

Personal information
- Full name: Dominic Francis Ralfs
- Born: 16 December 1967 (age 58); Hendon, Middlesex, England
- Batting: Right-handed
- Bowling: Right-arm medium

Domestic team information
- Years: Team
- 1991–1999: Cambridgeshire

Career statistics
Competition	LA
Matches	6
Runs scored	39
Batting average	13.00
100s/50s	–/–
Top score	14*
Balls bowled	342
Wickets	4
Bowling average	67.25
5 wickets in innings	–
10 wickets in match	–
Best bowling	2/69
Catches/stumpings	–/–
- Source: Cricinfo, 21 July 2010

Dominic Francis Ralfs (born 16 December 1967) is a former English cricketer. Ralfs was a right-handed batsman who bowled right-arm medium pace. He was born at Hendon, Middlesex.

Ralfs made his debut for Cambridgeshire in the 1991 Minor Counties Championship against Staffordshire. From 1991 to 1999, he represented the county in 47 Minor Counties Championships matches, with his final appearance for the county coming against Buckinghamshire. He also represented Cambridgeshire in 16 MCCA Knockout Trophy matches from 1992 to 1999.

Ralfs also represented Cambridgeshire in List-A cricket, with his debut List-A game coming against Hampshire. From 1994 to 1999, he represented the county in 6 List-A matches, with his final List-A match coming against the Netherlands in the 1999 NatWest Trophy. In his 6 matches, he took 4 wickets at an expensive bowling average of 67.25, with best figures of 2/69.

In 2018 Ralfs attempted a comeback for local village side Castor Cricket Club, but his return was plagued by injuries and he made only a handful of appearances.
