= Keith Greenfield =

English cricketer and Director of Cricket

Keith Greenfield (born 6 December 1968) is the current Director of Cricket for Sussex County Cricket Club.

Greenfield is a former English first-class cricketer, whose career for Sussex spanned twelve years between 1987 until 1999. He played 78 first-class and 160 one-day matches for the county, scoring over 7,000 runs in total.

A right-handed batsman, he was also an occasional right-arm medium bowler who picked up thirty-two wickets.

He joined Sussex initially as part of a Youth Opportunities Scheme, progressing through the Second XI team and development squads until he was given a chance in the First XI. His career best, 154, came against Glamorgan.

After his playing career ended he joined the administrative staff as Director of the Sussex Academy, being awarded a testimonial in 2004, followed by a promotion to Cricket Performance Manager in 2005.

He also continued to play club cricket in Brighton, where he was born, and Hove.
