= Michael Foster (cricketer, born 1972) =

English cricketer (born 1972)

Michael James Foster (born 17 September 1972, Leeds, Yorkshire, England) is a former first-class cricketer, who played for Yorkshire, Durham and Northamptonshire.

Foster appeared for Yorkshire in 1993 and 1994, and for Durham from 1996 to 1998. He also played one day cricket for Northamptonshire in 1995, and then for Durham until 1999.

In 30 first-class matches, this right-handed batsman scored 1,128 runs at 23.50, with a best of 129 against Glamorgan, his only first-class century. He took 61 wickets with his right arm fast medium pace at 30.14, with a best of 4 for 21 against Middlesex.

In 63 one day games, Foster scored 962 runs at 20.91, with a top score of 118 for Yorkshire against Leicestershire, and he took 42 wickets at 43.28, with a best of 3 for 26 against Worcestershire.

He also played in three Youth Test Matches against Pakistan Under-19s on tour in 1991–92, plus two one day internationals.
