= Paul Aldred =

English cricketer (born 1969)

Paul Aldred (born 4 February 1969) is a former English first-class cricketer. Between 1995 and 2002 he played for Derbyshire.

Born in Chellaston, Derby, Aldred was a right-handed batsman and a right-arm medium-pace bowler. His county debut came in 1995, and his top batting score of 83, achieved against Hampshire, came during 1997. His best bowling figures are 7/101, achieved against Lancashire in Derby in Derbyshire's 1999. He continued in First-class cricket until 2002, when he retired.

Since finishing at Derbyshire, Aldred has been running his own cricket coaching business and has become the patron of the Derbyshire Disabled Cricket team. He also has a business making handmade cricket bats.
