= 1998–99 Canberra Cosmos FC season =

Canberra Cosmos
1998–99 season
- Manager: Tony Brennan; Tom Sermanni
- Stadium: Bruce Stadium
- National Soccer League: 15th
- Top goalscorer: Peter Buljan (9)
- Highest home attendance: 5,321 vs. Brisbane Strikers (21 December 1998); National Soccer League
- Lowest home attendance: 1,449 vs. Carlton (8 March 1999); National Soccer League
- Average home league attendance: 2,328
- Biggest win: 3–0 vs. Newcastle Breakers (H) (26 January 1999); National Soccer League
- Biggest defeat: 0–5 vs. Sydney Olympic (A) (1 November 1998); National Soccer League

The 1998–99 season was the fourth in the history of Canberra Cosmos. It was also the fourth season in the National Soccer League.

== Players ==
Note: Flags indicate national team as defined under FIFA eligibility rules; some limited exceptions apply. Players may hold more than one non-FIFA nationality.

No.	Pos.	Nation	Player
1	GK	AUS	Vilson Knezevic
2	FW	AUS	Harry James
3	DF	AUS	Toplica Popovich
4	DF	AUS	Danny Burt
5	DF	AUS	Lindsay Wilson
6	DF	AUS	Ivan Zelic
7	DF	AUS	Doug Marcina
8	FW	AUS	Anthony Magnacca
9	FW	AUS	Nik Mrdja
10	FW	AUS	Peter Buljan
11	MF	AUS	David Arranz
12	MF	ARG	Leo Langone
13	DF	AUS	Andrew Clark
14	DF	POR	Amarildo Miglietti
15		SVK	Michael Hudek
16	MF	AUS	Ilija Prenzoski

No.	Pos.	Nation	Player
17	FW	AUS	Michael Musitano
18	MF	NIR	Norman Kelly
19	MF	AUS	Geoff Howarth
20	GK	AUS	Grant Barlow
21	MF	SLV	Oscar Zamora
22	MF	AUS	Scott Conlon
23	DF	AUS	Elliot Zwangobani
24	DF	AUS	Paul Roberts
25	MF	AUS	Ivo de Jesus
26	MF	AUS	Gabriel Gonzalez
27	DF	AUS	Nick Purdue
28	DF	SCO	Gordon Hunter
30	GK	AUS	Angelo Konstantinou
31	DF	AUS	Dale Wingell
—	FW	AUS	David Milin

== Competitions ==
=== Overview ===
Competition	First match	Last match	Starting round	Final position	Record							
Competition	First match	Last match	Starting round	Final position	Pld	W	D	L	GF	GA	GD	Win %
National Soccer League	11 October 1998	24 April 1999	Matchday 1	15th	28	4	3	21	21	55	−34	14.29
Total					28	4	3	21	21	55	−34	14.29

Source: Competitions

=== National Soccer League ===
==== League table ====
Pos	Team	Pld	W	D	L	GF	GA	GD	Pts	Qualification
1	Sydney United	28	18	4	6	53	33	+20	58	Qualification for the Finals series
2	South Melbourne (C)	28	17	6	5	50	26	+24	57	Qualification for the Finals series and the Oceania Club Championship
3	Perth Glory	28	16	5	7	62	37	+25	53	Qualification for the Finals series
4	Marconi Fairfield	28	15	3	10	53	47	+6	48	Qualification for the Finals series
5	Northern Spirit	28	14	4	10	36	35	+1	46	Qualification for the Finals series
6	Adelaide City	28	13	6	9	39	26	+13	45	Qualification for the Finals series
7	Sydney Olympic	28	12	7	9	46	36	+10	43	
8	Newcastle Breakers	28	11	7	10	29	33	−4	40	
9	Brisbane Strikers	28	11	6	11	41	47	−6	39	
10	Wollongong Wolves	28	8	8	12	45	52	−7	32	
11	Carlton	28	9	4	15	47	47	0	31	
12	Melbourne Knights	28	8	5	15	32	43	−11	29	
13	West Adelaide	28	7	6	15	36	46	−10	27	
14	Gippsland Falcons	28	5	10	13	17	44	−27	25	
15	Canberra Cosmos	28	4	3	21	21	55	−34	15	

Source: rsssf.com
Rules for classification: 1) points; 2) goal difference; 3) number of goals scored.
(C) Champions

==== Results by round ====
Round	1	2	3	4	5	6	7	8	9	10	11	12	13	14	15	16	17	18	19	20	21	22	23	24	25	26	27	28	29	30
Ground	H	A	H	A	A	A	A	A	H	H	H	A	B	H	A	A	H	A	H	A	H	A	H	A	A	A	H	B	A	H
Result	L	L	L	L	L	L	L	L	L	L	L	L	✖	L	D	D	W	L	W	L	L	L	W	L	W	L	L	✖	L	D
Position	13	13	14	15	15	15	15	15	15	15	15	15	15	15	15	15	15	15	15	15	15	15	15	15	15	15	15	15	15	15

Source: worldfootball.net
A = Away; H = Home; B = Bye; W = Win; D = Draw; L = Loss

==== Matches ====
11 October 1998 1	Canberra Cosmos	1–3	Adelaide Sharks	Canberra
	James 32'	Report	Duric 1'; Gibson 38'; Vidakovic 90'	Stadium: Bruce Stadium; Attendance: 2,797; Referee: E. Lennie

16 October 1998 2	Newcastle Breakers	2–1	Canberra Cosmos	Newcastle
	Wieczorek 3'; Yoon 75'	Report	Buljan 82' (pen.)	Stadium: Breakers Stadium; Attendance: 4,483; Referee: Con Diomis

25 October 1998 3	Canberra Cosmos	1–2	Marconi Fairfield	Canberra
	Buljan 25'	Report	Maloney 37'; Trajanovski 83'	Stadium: Bruce Stadium; Attendance: 2,500; Referee: J. Tippett

1 November 1998 4	Sydney Olympic	5–0	Canberra Cosmos	Sydney
	Tome 1', 30'; Cardozo 13'; Emerton 81'; Carle 88'	Report		Stadium: Belmore Sports Ground; Attendance: 5,493; Referee: J. Blaney

8 November 1998 5	Perth Glory	5–1	Canberra Cosmos	Perth
	Hay 2'; Markovski 31', 73'; Kalogeracos 49'; Halpin 57'	Report	Buljan 72'	Stadium: Perth Oval; Attendance: 13,943; Referee: W. Dade

15 November 1998 6	Carlton	3–0	Canberra Cosmos	Melbourne
	Cervinski 30'; Tricarico 57'; Bresciano 83'	Report		Stadium: Optus Oval; Attendance: 2,760; Referee: S. Hasic

22 November 1998 7	Melbourne Knights	2–0	Canberra Cosmos	Melbourne
	Karl 30'; Kelic 41'	Report		Stadium: Knights Stadium; Attendance: 1,975; Referee: P. Mur

29 November 1998 8	Wollongong City	4–2	Canberra Cosmos	Wollongong
	Horsley 18'; Chipperfield 52'; Masi 84'; Petrovski 84'	Report	Buljan 4'; Magnacca 57'	Stadium: Brandon Park; Attendance: 3,047; Referee: P. Mur

7 December 1998 9	Canberra Cosmos	0–1	Adelaide City	Canberra
		Report		Stadium: Bruce Stadium; Attendance: 1,722; Referee: D. Dwight

14 December 1998 10	Canberra Cosmos	0–1	Northern Spirit	Canberra
		Report	Bilokapic 56' (pen.)	Stadium: Bruce Stadium; Attendance: 1,704; Referee: G. Leverton

21 December 1998 11	Canberra Cosmos	0–1	Brisbane Strikers	Canberra
		Report	Laybutt 69'	Stadium: Bruce Stadium; Attendance: 5,321; Referee: S. Hasic

27 December 1998 12	Sydney United	2–0	Canberra Cosmos	Sydney
	Sterjovski 15'; Ardone 44'	Report		Stadium: Edensor Park; Attendance: 3,268; Referee: B. McKay

11 January 1999 14	Canberra Cosmos	1–3	South Melbourne	Canberra
	Buljan 24'	Report	Curcija 3'; Trimboli 69'; Polak 71'	Stadium: Bruce Stadium; Attendance: 2,940; Referee: B. Hugo

17 January 1999 15	Gippsland Falcons	1–1	Canberra Cosmos	Morwell
	Osman 83'	Report	Buljan 43'	Stadium: Mobil Park; Attendance: 1,460; Referee: B. McKay

24 January 1999 16	Adelaide Sharks	1–1	Canberra Cosmos	Adelaide
	Porter 56'	Report	Duric 12' (o.g.)	Stadium: Hindmarsh Stadium; Attendance: 2,023; Referee: L. Prospero

26 January 1999 17	Canberra Cosmos	3–0	Newcastle Breakers	Canberra
	Buljan 12'; Langone 18'; Marcina 87'	Report		Stadium: Bruce Stadium; Attendance: 1,726; Referee: B. Panella

31 January 1999 18	Adelaide City	1–0	Canberra Cosmos	Adelaide
	Mori 23'	Report		Stadium: Hindmarsh Stadium; Attendance: 4,178; Referee: L. Prospero

8 February 1999 19	Canberra Cosmos	1–0	Wollongong City	Canberra
	Buljan 8'	Report		Stadium: Bruce Stadium; Attendance: 1,678; Referee: J. Tippett

13 February 1999 20	Marconi Fairfield	2–1	Canberra Cosmos	Sydney
	Care 6'; Trajanovski 57'	Report	de Jesus 76'	Stadium: Marconi Stadium; Attendance: 3,687; Referee: B. McKay

22 March 1999 21	Canberra Cosmos	0–1	Sydney Olympic	Canberra
		Report	Tome 54'	Stadium: Bruce Stadium; Attendance: 2,420; Referee: M. Breeze

28 February 1999 22	Perth Glory	3–1	Canberra Cosmos	Perth
	Despotovski 7'; Edwards 75', 86'	Report	de Jesus 78'	Stadium: Perth Oval; Attendance: 12,072; Referee: S. Hasic

8 March 1999 23	Canberra Cosmos	2–0	Carlton	Canberra
	de Jesus 33'; Buljan 36'	Report		Stadium: Bruce Stadium; Attendance: 1,449; Referee: P. Mur

14 March 1999 24	Melbourne Knights	3–0	Canberra Cosmos	Melbourne
	Kutlesovski 49'; Kelic 71', 87'	Report		Stadium: Knights Stadium; Attendance: 2,536; Referee: C. Diomis

19 March 1999 25	Northern Spirit	1–2	Canberra Cosmos	Sydney
	Zane 21'	Report	Magnacca 29'; de Jesus 72'	Stadium: North Sydney Oval; Attendance: 10,482; Referee: E. Lennie

27 March 1999 26	Brisbane Strikers	3–1	Canberra Cosmos	Brisbane
	Knipe 27', 87'; Meredith 71'	Report	de Jesus 86'	Stadium: Suncorp Stadium; Attendance: 3,454; Referee: M. Breeze

5 May 1999 27	Canberra Cosmos	1–4	Sydney United	Canberra
	Magnacca 65'	Report	Day 3', 38'; Kupresak 52'; Moric 88'	Stadium: Bruce Stadium; Attendance: 2,111; Referee: M. Breeze

18 April 1999 29	South Melbourne	1–0	Canberra Cosmos	Melbourne
	Orlic 71'	Report		Stadium: Bob Jane Stadium; Attendance: 8,864; Referee: G. Connolly

24 April 1999 30	Canberra Cosmos	0–0	Gippsland Falcons	Canberra
		Report		Stadium: Bruce Stadium; Attendance: 1,666; Referee: M. Breeze

== Statistics ==
=== Appearances and goals ===
Players with no appearances not included in the list.

No.	Pos.	Nat.	Name	National Soccer League		Total	
No.	Pos.	Nat.	Name	Apps	Goals	Apps	Goals
1	GK	(Australia)	Vilson Knezevic	27	0	27	0
2	FW	(Australia)	Harry James	3	1	3	1
3	DF	(Australia)	Toplica Popovich	26	0	26	0
4	DF	(Australia)	Danny Burt	16(7)	0	23	0
5	DF	(Australia)	Lindsay Wilson	18(1)	0	19	0
6	DF	(Australia)	Ivan Zelic	18	0	18	0
7	DF	(Australia)	Doug Marcina	27	1	27	1
8	FW	(Australia)	Anthony Magnacca	17(5)	3	22	3
9	FW	(Australia)	Nik Mrdja	2(1)	0	3	0
10	FW	(Australia)	Peter Buljan	27	9	27	9
11	MF	(Australia)	David Arranz	2(7)	0	9	0
12	MF	(Argentina)	Leo Langone	12(6)	1	18	1
13	DF	(Australia)	Andrew Clark	7(1)	0	8	0
14	DF	(Portugal)	Amarildo Miglietti	21	0	21	0
16	MF	(Australia)	Ilija Prenzoski	5(8)	0	13	0
17	FW	(Australia)	Michael Musitano	13(9)	0	22	0
18	MF	(Northern Ireland)	Norman Kelly	14	0	14	0
19	MF	(Australia)	Geoff Howarth	0(2)	0	2	0
20	GK	(Australia)	Grant Below	1(2)	0	3	0
22	MF	(Australia)	Scott Conlon	0(1)	0	1	0
23	DF	(Australia)	Elliot Zwangobani	1	0	1	0
24	DF	(Australia)	Paul Roberts	15(2)	0	17	0
25	MF	(Australia)	Ivo de Jesus	11(3)	5	14	5
26	MF	(Australia)	Gabriel Gonzalez	9(5)	0	14	0
27	DF	(Australia)	Nick Purdue	7(7)	0	14	0
28	DF	(Scotland)	Gordon Hunter	8	0	8	0
31	DF	(Australia)	Dale Wingell	1(2)	0	3	0

=== Clean sheets ===
Rank	No.	Pos	Nat	Name	National Soccer League	Total
1	1	GK	(Australia)	Vilson Knezevic	4	4
Total					4	4
