= List of Canberra Cosmos FC players =

Canberra Cosmos Football Club, an association football club based in Canberra, was founded in 1995. They were admitted into the National Soccer League for the 1995–96 season until the club folded in 2001.

Toplica Popovich held the record for the greatest number of appearances for Canberra Cosmos. The Australian defender played 123 times for the club. The club's goalscoring record was held by Peter Buljan who scored 21 goals.

== Key ==
- The list is ordered first by date of debut, and then if necessary in alphabetical order.
- Appearances as a substitute are included.

Positions key
GK	Goalkeeper
DF	Defender
MF	Midfielder
FW	Forward

Nationality
Unless otherwise noted, the nationality of a player is determined by the country/countries which he has played for, or if said person has not played international football, their country of birth.
Club career
Club career is defined as the first and last calendar years in which the player appeared for the club in any of the competitions listed below.
Total appearances and Total goals
Total appearances and goals comprise those in the National Soccer League and NSL Cup.

== Players ==
List of Canberra Cosmos FC players
Player	Nationality	Pos	Club career	Starts	Subs	Total	Goals
Player	Nationality	Pos	Club career	Appearances			Goals
Lachlan Armstrong	Australia	MF	1995–1999	38	2	40	7
James Baxter	Australia	MF	1995–1997	16	11	27	1
Paul Dee	Australia	MF	1995–1998	73	1	74	5
Jason Dunn	Australia	DF	1995–1996; 1998	28	0	28	3
Joe Gagetti	Australia	DF	1995	5	0	5	0
Michael Garcia	Australia	MF	1995–1997	25	2	27	0
Willie Hastie	Australia	MF	1995	4	1	5	0
Danny Milosevic	Australia	GK	1995–1997	16	0	16	0
Arsenije Popovich	Australia	MF	1995–1996	3	6	9	1
Paul Wade	Australia	MF	1995–1997	45	0	45	11
Richard Watson	Australia	DF	1995–1996	34	2	36	0
Marko Perinovic	Australia	FW	1995–1998	37	6	43	10
Tony Lemezina	Australia	FW	1995–1997	21	19	40	8
Michael Musitano	Australia	FW	1995–1996; 1997–2000	59	23	82	8
Norman Kelly	Northern Ireland	MF	1995–1999	79	0	79	9
Steve Mautone	Australia	GK	1995–1996	20	0	20	0
John Koch	Australia	DF	1995–1997	50	1	51	2
Stan Dukic	Australia	DF	1995–1996	8	4	12	0
Toplica Popovich	Australia	DF	1995–2001	114	12	126	4
Gus Cerro	Australia	MF	1995–1996	6	0	6	0
Peter Mazis	Australia	DF	1995–1997	37	0	37	2
Alex Castro	Australia	MF	1996; 1999–2001	49	3	52	14
Ben Harris	Australia	GK	1996	3	0	3	0
Njegosh Popovich	Australia	MF	1996	3	2	5	0
Anthony Giannasca	Australia	DF	1996–1998; 2001	49	0	49	0
David Milin	Australia	DF	1996–1997; 1999–2001	36	15	51	2
Mladen Rogic	Australia	MF	1996	3	1	4	0
Peter Buljan	Australia	FW	1996–1999	58	8	66	21
Vince Grella	Australia	MF	1996–1997	11	3	14	1
Steven Howe	Australia	MF	1996	0	1	1	0
Lindsay Wilson	Australia	DF	1996–1999	36	12	48	2
Steve Lazzari	Australia	FW	1996	2	2	4	0
Allan Reis	Australia	FW	1996	0	1	1	0
George Sorras	Australia	DF	1996–1997	18	1	19	2
Ante Juric	Australia	DF	1996–1997	9	1	10	0
Rodrigo Moreno	Australia	MF	1996–1997	10	0	10	0
Barney Smith	Australia	GK	1997; 2000–2001	14	0	14	0
John Markovski	Australia	MF	1997	7	0	7	2
Joe Campagna	Australia	MF	1997	0	3	3	0
Tom Haythornwaite	Australia	DF	1997–1998	18	6	24	0
Harry James	Australia	FW	1997–2000	41	9	50	5
Paul Jones	Australia	GK	1997	2	0	2	0
Ante Moric	Australia	MF	1997–1998	20	0	20	3
Andrew Ravanello	Australia	MF	1997–1998; 2000–2001	31	8	39	0
Andy Roberts	Australia	DF	1997–1998	20	2	22	0
Dale Wingell	Australia	DF	1997–1999	11	5	16	0
Damien Brown	Australia	MF	1997–1998	4	12	16	1
Ivan Zelic	Australia	DF	1997–1999	32	3	34	2
Gordon Hunter	Scotland	DF	1997–1998; 1999	28	0	28	2
Ilija Prenozski	Australia	MF	1997–2001	15	38	53	2
Trim Morgan	Australia	MF	1998	3	1	4	0
Kim Jong-su	South Korea	FW	1998	4	1	5	0
Shane Lyons	Australia	MF	1998; 2000–2001	15	8	23	0
Oscar Zamaro	El Salvador	MF	1998	0	1	1	0
David Arranz	Australia	MF	1998–2001	44	11	55	2
Danny Burt	Australia	DF	1998–2000	34	8	42	3
Andrew Clark	Australia	DF	1998–2000	18	3	21	5
Vilson Knezevic	Australia	GK	1998–1999	27	0	27	0
Doug Marcina	Australia	DF	1998–1999	27	0	27	1
Geoff Howarth	Australia	MF	1998–2000	0	3	3	0
Anthony Magnacca	Australia	MF	1998–1999	17	5	22	3
Scott Conlon	Australia	MF	1998–2000	0	2	2	0
Grant Below	Australia	GK	1998–2000	22	2	24	0
Leo Langone	Argentina	MF	1998–1999	12	6	18	1
Elliot Zwangobani	Australia	MF	1998–2000	1	3	4	0
Amarildo Migletti	Portugal	DF	1998–1999	21	0	21	0
Nik Mrdja	Australia	FW	1998	2	1	3	0
Paul Roberts	Australia	MF	1998–2000	34	3	37	1
Nick Purdue	Australia	DF	1999–2001	36	20	56	1
Gabriel Gonzalez	Australia	MF	1999–2000	24	9	33	2
Ivo de Jesus	Australia	MF	1999–2000	32	10	42	17
Robert Hooker	Australia	DF	1999–2001	54	3	57	2
Glenn Kolpak	Australia	FW	1999–2000	9	12	21	0
Jason Polak	Australia	MF	1999–2000	32	0	32	3
Daniel Watkins	Australia	FW	1999–2000	21	8	29	6
Angelo Konstantinou	Australia	GK	1999–2001	25	0	25	0
David Winnie	Australia	DF	1999–2000	23	0	23	1
Brian Hamilton	Scotland	DF	1999–2000	26	1	27	1
Jon Angelucci	Australia	FW	2000–2001	24	1	25	7
Naoki Imaya	Japan	MF	2000–2001	10	10	20	3
Marcus Phillips	England	MF	2000	7	1	8	2
Brad Scott	New Zealand	FW	2000–2001	10	8	18	2
Mark Hagger	Australia	FW	2000–2001	10	12	22	5
Dom Labutte	Australia	FW	2000	0	1	1	0
Andy Rakic	Australia	FW	2000–2001	3	6	9	0
Hiroshi Miyazawa	Japan	DF	2000–2001	24	0	24	0
Milton Cortes	Uruguay	MF	2000–2001	11	7	18	7
Con Anthopoulos	Australia	DF	2001	16	0	16	2
Stephen Kemp	Australia	MF	2001	7	1	8	1
Daniel Aliffi	Australia	FW	2001	6	1	7	1
Paul Ivanic	Australia	FW	2001	1	3	4	3
