= 1997–98 Canberra Cosmos FC season =

Canberra Cosmos
1997–98 season
- Manager: Branko Culina; Rale Rasic
- Stadium: Seiffert Oval; Bruce Stadium
- National Soccer League: 14th
- Top goalscorer: Peter Buljan (9)
- Highest home attendance: 3,547 vs. Marconi Fairfield (17 January 1998); National Soccer League
- Lowest home attendance: 1,576 vs. Newcastle Breakers (13 December 1997); National Soccer League
- Average home league attendance: 2,796
- Biggest win: 8–1 vs. UTS Olympic (H) (5 January 1998); National Soccer League
- Biggest defeat: 0–8 vs. Wollongong Wolves (A) (5 December 1997); National Soccer League

The 1997–98 season was the third in the history of Canberra Cosmos. It was also the third season in the National Soccer League.

== Players ==
Note: Flags indicate national team as defined under FIFA eligibility rules; some limited exceptions apply. Players may hold more than one non-FIFA nationality.

No.	Pos.	Nation	Player
1	GK	AUS	Anthony Giannasca
2	MF	AUS	Paul Dee
3	DF	AUS	Andy Roberts
4	DF	AUS	Ivan Zelic
5	MF	AUS	Andrew Ravanello
6	MF	AUS	Ante Moric
7	MF	AUS	Rodrigo Moreno
8	MF	NIR	Norman Kelly
9	FW	AUS	Harry James
10	FW	AUS	Michael Musitano
11	FW	AUS	Tony Lemezina
12	FW	AUS	Peter Buljan
13	DF	AUS	Lindsay Wilson
14	DF	AUS	Dale Wingell
16	DF	AUS	Toplica Popovich
17	MF	AUS	Ilija Prenzoski

No.	Pos.	Nation	Player
18	DF	AUS	Tom Haythornwaite
19	MF	AUS	Damien Brown
20	GK	AUS	Barney Smith
21		AUS	Adrian Dowling
22	FW	AUS	Trim Morgan
23	DF	AUS	Jason Dunn
24	FW	KOR	Kim Jong-su
29	GK	AUS	Paul Jones
—	MF	AUS	James Baxter
—	MF	AUS	Ivo de Jesus
—	DF	SCO	Gordon Hunter
—	MF	AUS	Shane Lyons
—	FW	AUS	Marko Perinovic
—	FW	AUS	David Milin
—	DF	SLV	Oscar Zamaro

== Competitions ==
=== Overview ===
Competition	First match	Last match	Starting round	Final position	Record							
Competition	First match	Last match	Starting round	Final position	Pld	W	D	L	GF	GA	GD	Win %
National Soccer League	4 October 1997	13 April 1998	Matchday 1	14th	26	3	8	15	29	56	−27	11.54
Total					26	3	8	15	29	56	−27	11.54

Source: Competitions

=== National Soccer League ===
==== League table ====
Pos	Team	Pld	W	D	L	GF	GA	GD	Pts	Qualification
1	South Melbourne (C)	26	13	9	4	56	41	+15	48	Qualification for the Finals series
2	Carlton	26	12	9	5	44	24	+20	45	Qualification for the Finals series
3	Adelaide City	26	13	4	9	45	30	+15	43	Qualification for the Finals series
4	Sydney United	26	11	10	5	37	26	+11	43	Qualification for the Finals series
5	Marconi Fairfield	26	12	7	7	33	25	+8	43	Qualification for the Finals series
6	Wollongong Wolves	26	13	3	10	51	33	+18	42	Qualification for the Finals series
7	Melbourne Knights	26	11	6	9	37	35	+2	39	
8	Perth Glory	26	10	6	10	35	40	−5	36	
9	UTS Olympic	26	10	5	11	37	43	−6	35	
10	West Adelaide	26	10	4	12	32	38	−6	34	
11	Gippsland Falcons	26	8	7	11	28	36	−8	31	
12	Brisbane Strikers	26	6	5	15	23	40	−17	23	
13	Newcastle Breakers	26	4	9	13	30	50	−20	21	
14	Canberra Cosmos	26	3	8	15	29	56	−27	17	

Source: rsssf.com
Rules for classification: 1) points; 2) goal difference; 3) number of goals scored.
(C) Champions

==== Results by round ====
Round	1	2	3	4	5	6	7	8	9	10	11	12	13	14	15	16	17	18	19	20	21	22	23	24	25	26
Ground	H	A	H	A	H	A	H	A	H	A	H	A	A	H	A	H	A	H	A	H	A	H	A	H	A	H
Result	L	L	L	L	L	D	W	D	D	L	D	D	D	W	L	L	L	W	L	L	L	D	D	L	L	L
Position	13	14	14	14	14	14	13	13	14	14	14	13	13	13	13	13	13	13	13	13	14	14	13	14	14	14

Source: worldfootball.net
A = Away; H = Home; W = Win; D = Draw; L = Loss

==== Matches ====
4 October 1997 1	Canberra Cosmos	1–3	Sydney United	Queanbeyan
	P. Buljan 67'	Report	Saad 12'; Hooker 19'; Bilokapic 78' (pen.)	Stadium: Seiffert Oval; Attendance: 3,500; Referee: C. Diomis

11 October 1997 2	Marconi Fairfield	2–0	Canberra Cosmos	Sydney
	Maloney 57'; Babic 74'	Report		Stadium: Marconi Stadium; Attendance: 4,530; Referee: Mark Shield

18 October 1997 3	Canberra Cosmos	1–3	Carlton	Queanbeyan
	Musitano 68'	Report	Anthopoulos 19'; Lapsansky 49'; Allsopp 60'	Stadium: Seiffert Oval; Attendance: 3,505; Referee: B. McKay

26 October 1997 4	Adelaide Sharks	3–0	Canberra Cosmos	Adelaide
	Day 30'; Cardozo 53', 62'	Report		Stadium: Thebarton Oval; Attendance: 3,655; Referee: P. McCaffrey

1 November 1997 5	Canberra Cosmos	1–2	Adelaide City	Queanbeyan
	Musitano 90'	Report	Sabljak 15'; Trajanovski 67'	Stadium: Seiffert Oval; Attendance: 2,005; Referee: S. Micallef

8 November 1997 6	Gippsland Falcons	0–0	Canberra Cosmos	Morwell
		Report		Stadium: Falcons Park; Attendance: 2,100; Referee: J. Blaney

15 November 1997 7	Canberra Cosmos	2–1	Brisbane Strikers	Queanbeyan
	Kelly 47'; Brown 89'	Report	Haythornthwaite 85' (o.g.)	Stadium: Seiffert Oval; Attendance: 2,008; Referee: B. McKay

23 November 1997 8	South Melbourne	1–1	Canberra Cosmos	Melbourne
	Coveny 43'	Report	James 44'	Stadium: Bob Jane Stadium; Attendance: 4,200; Referee: J. Blaney

28 November 1997 9	Canberra Cosmos	1–1	Melbourne Knights	Queanbeyan
	Buljan 68'	Report	T. Pondeljak 80'	Stadium: Seiffert Oval; Attendance: 3,356; Referee: G. Connolly

5 December 1997 10	Wollongong City	8–0	Canberra Cosmos	Wollongong
	Chipperfield 20', 36', 40', 55'; Masi 21'; Ceccoli 25'; Surjan 49'; Younis 85'	Report		Stadium: Brandon Park; Attendance: 3,868; Referee: B. Panella

13 December 1997 11	Canberra Cosmos	1–1	Newcastle Breakers	Queanbeyan
	Moric 44'	Report	McGuire 87'	Stadium: Seiffert Oval; Attendance: 1,576; Referee: M. Breeze

21 December 1997 12	Perth Glory	1–1	Canberra Cosmos	Perth
	Naven 48'	Report	Zelic 65'	Stadium: Perth Oval; Attendance: 12,174; Referee: E. Brazzale

28 December 1997 13	UTS Olympic	1–1	Canberra Cosmos	Sydney
	Tome 13'	Report	Buljan 39'	Stadium: Belmore Sports Ground; Attendance: 4,638; Referee: Mark Shield

5 January 1998 14	Canberra Cosmos	8–1	UTS Olympic	Queanbeyan
	Moric 5', 68'; Wilson 36'; P. Buljan 41', 58', 63'; Prenzoski 72', 90'	Report	Tome 82'	Stadium: Seiffert Oval; Attendance: 3,062; Referee: M. Breeze

11 January 1998 15	Sydney United	4–1	Canberra Cosmos	Sydney
	Bilokapic 22' (pen.), 90'; Wilson 45' (o.g.); J. Culina 53'	Report	P. Buljan 78'	Stadium: Parramatta Stadium; Attendance: 3,878; Referee: C. Diomis

17 January 1998 16	Canberra Cosmos	0–2	Marconi Fairfield	Queanbeyan
		Report	Maloney 32'; Longo 36'	Stadium: Seiffert Oval; Attendance: 3,547; Referee: D. Dwight

24 January 1998 17	Carlton	2–0	Canberra Cosmos	Melbourne
	Markovski 34'; Allsopp 68'	Report		Stadium: Optus Oval; Attendance: 2,476; Referee: J. Blaney

31 January 1998 18	Canberra Cosmos	1–0	Adelaide Sharks	Queanbeyan
	Hunter 75'	Report		Stadium: Seiffert Oval; Attendance: 2,472; Referee: E. Lennie

22 February 1998 19	Adelaide City	4–1	Canberra Cosmos	Adelaide
	Mori 3', 84'; Mennillo 65'; Trajanovski 90'	Report	Buljan 19'	Stadium: Hindmarsh Stadium; Attendance: 3,477; Referee: B. Hugo

2 March 1998 20	Canberra Cosmos	1–3	Gippsland Falcons	Queanbeyan
	T. Popovich 48'	Report	MacNicol 2'; Thompson 55', 75'	Stadium: Seiffert Oval; Attendance: 2,016

8 March 1998 21	Melbourne Knights	3–1	Canberra Cosmos	Melbourne
	Marth 41'; Kelic 52'; Susa 79'	Report	Dunn 56'	Stadium: Knights Stadium; Attendance: 3,584; Referee: G. Leverton

16 March 1998 22	Canberra Cosmos	1–1	South Melbourne	Canberra
	Hunter 44'	Report	Coveny 34'	Stadium: Bruce Stadium; Attendance: 3,471; Referee: B. McKay

21 March 1998 23	Brisbane Strikers	2–2	Canberra Cosmos	Brisbane
	Brown 21'; Gwynne 44'	Report	James 50'; Perinovic 75'	Stadium: Suncorp Stadium; Attendance: 2,701; Referee: W. Dade

30 March 1998 24	Canberra Cosmos	1–3	Wollongong City	Canberra
	Jong-su 44'	Report	Ceccoli 26'; Perinich 28'; Dimoski 87'	Stadium: Bruce Stadium; Attendance: 2,342; Referee: G. Leverton

3 April 1998 25	Newcastle Breakers	2–1	Canberra Cosmos	Newcastle
	Pryce 12' (pen.); Bosnar 54'	Report	Buljan 59'	Stadium: Topper Stadium; Attendance: 3,344; Referee: C. Diomis

13 April 1998 26	Canberra Cosmos	1–2	Perth Glory	Canberra
	James 57'	Report	Despotovski 25'; Wilkinson 89'	Stadium: Bruce Stadium; Attendance: 3,492; Referee: J. Tippett

== Statistics ==
=== Appearances and goals ===
Players with no appearances not included in the list.

No.	Pos.	Nat.	Name	National Soccer League		Total	
No.	Pos.	Nat.	Name	Apps	Goals	Apps	Goals
1	GK	(Australia)	Anthony Giannasca	23	0	23	0
2	MF	(Australia)	Paul Dee	21	0	21	0
3	DF	(Australia)	Andy Roberts	20(2)	0	22	0
4	DF	(Australia)	Ivan Zelic	14(1)	2	15	2
5	MF	(Australia)	Andrew Ravanello	15(3)	0	18	0
6	MF	(Australia)	Ante Moric	20	3	20	3
7	MF	(Australia)	Rodrigo Moreno	1	0	1	0
8	MF	(Northern Ireland)	Norman Kelly	21	0	21	0
9	FW	(Australia)	Harry James	13(6)	3	19	3
10	FW	(Australia)	Michael Musitano	16(3)	2	19	3
11	FW	(Australia)	Tony Lemezina	3(1)	0	4	0
12	FW	(Australia)	Peter Buljan	21(2)	9	23	9
13	DF	(Australia)	Lindsay Wilson	9(10)	1	19	1
14	DF	(Australia)	Dale Wingell	10(3)	0	13	0
15	FW	(Australia)	Marko Perinovic	3(4)	1	7	1
16	DF	(Australia)	Toplica Popovich	22(1)	1	23	1
17	MF	(Australia)	Ilija Prenzoski	1(13)	2	14	2
18	DF	(Australia)	Tom Haythornwaite	18(6)	0	24	0
19	MF	(Australia)	Damien Brown	4(12)	1	16	1
20	GK	(Australia)	Barney Smith	1	0	1	0
22	FW	(Australia)	Trim Morgan	3(1)	0	4	0
23	DF	(Australia)	Jason Dunn	1	1	1	1
24	FW	(South Korea)	Kim Jong-su	4(1)	0	5	0
29	GK	(Australia)	Paul Jones	2	0	2	0
—	DF	(Scotland)	Gordon Hunter	20	2	20	2
—	MF	(Australia)	Shane Lyons	0(1)	0	1	0
—	DF	(El Salvador)	Oscar Zamaro	0(1)	0	1	0

=== Clean sheets ===
Rank	No.	Pos	Nat	Name	National Soccer League	Total
1	1	GK	(Australia)	Anthony Giannasca	2	2
Total					2	2
