= 1999–2000 Canberra Cosmos FC season =

Canberra Cosmos
1999–2000 season
- Manager: Tom Sermanni
- Stadium: Bruce Stadium
- National Soccer League: 14th
- Top goalscorer: Ivo de Jesus (12)
- Highest home attendance: 4,425 vs. Adelaide Force (1 October 1999); National Soccer League
- Lowest home attendance: 1,214 vs. Wollongong Wolves (14 April 2000); National Soccer League
- Average home league attendance: 2,427
- Biggest win: 3–0 vs. Adelaide Force (1 October 1999); National Soccer League; 3–0 vs. Sydney United (15 November 1999); National Soccer League
- Biggest defeat: 0–6 vs. Wollongong Wolves (14 April 2000); National Soccer League

The 1999–2000 season was the fifth in the history of Canberra Cosmos. It was also the fifth season in the National Soccer League.

== Players ==
Note: Flags indicate national team as defined under FIFA eligibility rules; some limited exceptions apply. Players may hold more than one non-FIFA nationality.

No.	Pos.	Nation	Player
2	FW	AUS	David Milin
3	DF	AUS	Toplica Popovich
4	DF	AUS	Danny Burt
5	DF	AUS	Nick Purdue
6	MF	AUS	Jason Polak
7	DF	SCO	David Winnie
8	FW	AUS	Daniel Watkins
9	MF	AUS	Alex Castro
10	FW	AUS	Michael Musitano
11	MF	AUS	David Arranz
12	MF	SCO	Brian Hamilton
14	FW	AUS	Harry James
15	FW	AUS	Glenn Kolpak

No.	Pos.	Nation	Player
16	MF	AUS	Ilija Prenzoski
17	DF	AUS	Robert Hooker (Captain)
18	FW	AUS	Nik Mrdja
19	MF	AUS	Geoff Howarth
20	GK	AUS	Grant Barlow
21	MF	AUS	Scott Conlon
22	DF	AUS	Elliot Zwangobani
23	DF	AUS	Andrew Clark
24	DF	AUS	Paul Roberts
25	MF	AUS	Ivo de Jesus
26	MF	AUS	Gabriel Gonzalez
30	GK	AUS	Angelo Konstantinou

== Competitions ==
=== Overview ===
Competition	First match	Last match	Starting round	Final position	Record							
Competition	First match	Last match	Starting round	Final position	Pld	W	D	L	GF	GA	GD	Win %
National Soccer League	1 October 1999	7 May 2000	Matchday 1	14th	34	9	9	16	44	64	−20	26.47
Total					34	9	9	16	44	64	−20	26.47

Source: Competitions

=== National Soccer League ===
==== League table ====
Pos	Team	Pld	W	D	L	GF	GA	GD	Pts	Qualification
1	Perth Glory	34	19	7	8	60	42	+18	64	Qualification for the Finals series
2	Wollongong Wolves (C)	34	17	9	8	72	44	+28	60	Qualification for the Finals series and the Oceania Club Championship
3	Carlton	34	17	7	10	55	39	+16	58	Qualification for the Finals series
4	Adelaide Force	34	16	8	10	57	37	+20	56	Qualification for the Finals series
5	Sydney Olympic	34	16	7	11	56	40	+16	55	Qualification for the Finals series
6	Marconi Fairfield	34	16	7	11	53	49	+4	55	Qualification for the Finals series
7	Newcastle Breakers	34	14	9	11	44	44	0	51	
8	Auckland Kingz	34	15	5	14	57	59	−2	50	
9	Brisbane Strikers	34	13	10	11	46	40	+6	49	
10	South Melbourne	34	14	7	13	55	51	+4	49	
11	Parramatta Power	34	14	5	15	52	47	+5	47	
12	Melbourne Knights	34	13	6	15	44	57	−13	45	
13	Northern Spirit	34	11	3	20	41	58	−17	36	
14	Canberra Cosmos	34	9	9	16	44	64	−20	36	
15	Gippsland Falcons	34	7	8	19	23	49	−26	29	
16	Sydney United	34	5	5	24	19	58	−39	20	

Source: rsssf.com
Rules for classification: 1) points; 2) goal difference; 3) number of goals scored.
(C) Champions

==== Results by round ====
Round	1	2	3	4	5	6	7	8	9	10	11	12	13	14	15	16	17	18	19	20	21	22	23	24	25	26	27	28	29	30	31	32	33	34
Ground	H	H	H	A	H	A	H	A	H	A	H	A	H	A	A	A	A	H	H	A	A	H	A	H	A	H	A	H	A	H	A	H	A	H
Result	W	L	L	W	D	L	W	D	L	L	L	L	L	L	L	W	D	D	D	L	D	W	L	L	D	W	L	L	D	L	W	W	W	D
Position	1	7	9	7	6	9	7	8	8	12	14	14	15	15	15	14	14	14	14	15	15	15	15	15	15	15	15	15	14	15	15	14	14	14

Source: worldfootball.net
A = Away; H = Home; W = Win; D = Draw; L = Loss

==== Matches ====
1 October 1999 1	Canberra Cosmos	3–0	Adelaide Force	Canberra
	Watkins 35', 65'; Castro 40'	Report		Stadium: Bruce Stadium; Attendance: 4,425; Referee: C. Diomis

10 October 1999 2	Canberra Cosmos	0–1	Sydney Olympic	Canberra
		Report	Baillie 81'	Stadium: Bruce Stadium; Attendance: 4,335; Referee: D. Dwight

15 October 1999 3	Canberra Cosmos	0–1	Brisbane Strikers	Canberra
		Report	Foster 87'	Stadium: Bruce Stadium; Attendance: 2,804; Referee: J. Blaney

22 October 1999 4	Parramatta Power	2–3	Canberra Cosmos	Sydney
	Griffiths 25', 48'	Report	Watkins 5', 58'; de Jesus 25'	Stadium: Parramatta Stadium; Attendance: 5,100; Referee: D. Rugg

29 October 1999 5	Canberra Cosmos	1–1	Perth Glory	Canberra
	Popovich 56'	Report	Boutsianis 62'	Stadium: Bruce Stadium; Attendance: 3,760; Referee: B. Precious

5 November 1999 6	Carlton	2–0	Canberra Cosmos	Melbourne
	Moreira 11'; Thompson 86'	Report		Stadium: Olympic Park; Attendance: 2,677; Referee: D. Rugg

15 November 1999 7	Canberra Cosmos	3–0	Sydney United	Canberra
	Milin 12', 41'; Watkins 51'	Report		Stadium: Bruce Stadium; Attendance: 2,404; Referee: C. Diomis

21 November 1999 8	South Melbourne	2–2	Canberra Cosmos	Melbourne
	Lozanovski 12'; Anastasiadis 63'	Report	Hamilton 53'; Winnie 90'	Stadium: Bob Jane Stadium; Attendance: 6,827; Referee: J. Blaney

26 November 1999 9	Canberra Cosmos	1–2	Newcastle Breakers	Canberra
	Polak 24'	Report	Harper 46'; Buonavoglia 61'	Stadium: Bruce Stadium; Attendance: 2,889; Referee: M. Breeze

3 December 1999 10	Carlton	5–1	Canberra Cosmos	Melbourne
	Marth 22'; Moreira 54', 86', 90'; Thompson 83'	Report	de Jesus 83'	Stadium: Olympic Park; Attendance: 2,166; Referee: C. Diomis

10 December 1999 11	Canberra Cosmos	1–3	Sydney Olympic	Canberra
	Arranz 49'	Report	Mendez 34'; Cardozo 43' (pen.); Baillie 71'	Stadium: Bruce Stadium; Attendance: 1,795; Referee: S. Micallef

19 December 1999 12	Wollongong Wolves	3–0	Canberra Cosmos	Wollongong
	Petrovski 15', 83'; Chipperfield 77'	Report		Stadium: Brandon Park; Attendance: 2,497; Referee: D. Dwight

28 December 1999 13	Canberra Cosmos	1–3	Northern Spirit	Canberra
	Polak 50'	Report	Perinich 2', 73'; Bingley 81'	Stadium: Bruce Stadium; Attendance: 1,863; Referee: C. Diomis

3 January 2000 14	Football Kingz	3–1	Canberra Cosmos	Auckland
	Silva 31'; de Jong 49'; Bunce 68'	Report	Musitano 82'	Stadium: North Harbour Stadium; Attendance: 2,512; Referee: Mark Shield

7 January 2000 15	Adelaide Force	1–0	Canberra Cosmos	Adelaide
	Kemp 52'	Report		Stadium: Hindmarsh Stadium; Attendance: 4,367; Referee: E. Lennie

16 January 2000 16	Marconi Fairfield	2–3	Canberra Cosmos	Sydney
	Duric 35'; Babic 63'	Report	Burt 50', 80'; de Jesus 89'	Stadium: Marconi Stadium; Attendance: 3,932; Referee: D. Dwight

23 January 2000 17	Melbourne Knights	1–1	Canberra Cosmos	Melbourne
	Cervinski 13'	Report	Gonzalez 36'	Stadium: Knights Stadium; Attendance: 3,105; Referee: W. Dade

26 January 2000 18	Canberra Cosmos	1–1	Melbourne Knights	Canberra
	de Jesus 65' (pen.)	Report	Susa 23'	Stadium: Bruce Stadium; Attendance: 1,959; Referee: Mark Shield

28 January 2000 19	Canberra Cosmos	1–1	Gippsland Falcons	Canberra
	Gonzalez 45'	Report	MacNicol 44'	Stadium: Bruce Stadium; Attendance: 1,847; Referee: M. Breeze

6 February 2000 20	Sydney Olympic	7–3	Canberra Cosmos	Sydney
	Cardozo 1', 24', 79'; Tome 21'; Emerton 70'; Arambasic 83', 87'	Report	Burt 10'; de Jesus 43', 57'	Stadium: Belmore Sports Ground; Attendance: 6,245; Referee: E. Lennie

12 February 2000 21	Brisbane Strikers	0–0	Canberra Cosmos	Brisbane
		Report		Stadium: Suncorp Stadium; Attendance: 3,123; Referee: C. Diomis

18 February 2000 22	Canberra Cosmos	1–0	Parramatta Power	Canberra
	Arranz 2'	Report		Stadium: Bruce Stadium; Attendance: 2,251; Referee: P. Mur

27 February 2000 23	Perth Glory	3–2	Canberra Cosmos	Perth
	Edwards 2', 28'; Boutsianis 42'	Report	de Jesus 31' (pen.), 70' (pen.)	Stadium: Perth Oval; Attendance: 13,158; Referee: M. Breeze

7 March 2000 24	Canberra Cosmos	0–2	Carlton	Canberra
		Report	Moreira 40'; McPherson 43'	Stadium: Bruce Stadium; Attendance: 1,502; Referee: P. Mur

12 March 2000 25	Sydney United	1–1	Canberra Cosmos	Sydney
	Jermen 86'	Report	Polak 53'	Stadium: Sydney United Sports Centre; Attendance: 2,106; Referee: B. Hugo

17 March 2000 26	Canberra Cosmos	4–2	South Melbourne	Canberra
	James 27'; Popovich 36'; de Jesus 54'; Clark 83'	Report	Anastasiadis 45'; Liparoti 81'	Stadium: Bruce Stadium; Attendance: 1,645; Referee: B. Hugo

28 March 2000 27	Newcastle Breakers	3–2	Canberra Cosmos	Newcastle
	Buonavoglia 62', 87'; Milin 38' (o.g.)	Report	Roberts 18'; Purdue 23'	Stadium: Breakers Stadium; Attendance: 3,831; Referee: M. Breeze

31 March 2000 28	Canberra Cosmos	0–2	Carlton	Canberra
		Report	Markovski 27'; Moreira 90'	Stadium: Bruce Stadium; Attendance: 1,984; Referee: Mark Shield

9 April 2000 29	Sydney Olympic	1–1	Canberra Cosmos	Sydney
	Cardozo 49'	Report	Watkins 71'	Stadium: Belmore Sports Ground; Attendance: 4,862; Referee: S. Micallef

14 April 2000 30	Canberra Cosmos	0–6	Wollongong Wolves	Canberra
		Report	Chipperfield 32', 45'; Young 64', 76' (pen.), 80', 90+1'	Stadium: Bruce Stadium; Attendance: 1,214; Referee: C. Zetter

22 April 2000 31	Northern Spirit	1–2	Canberra Cosmos	Gosford
	R. Griffiths 55'	Report	Clark 36', 57'	Stadium: North Power Stadium; Attendance: 10,214; Referee: Mark Shield

25 April 2000 32	Canberra Cosmos	2–1	Football Kingz	Canberra
	de Jesus 33', 78'	Report	Rufer 28'	Stadium: Bruce Stadium; Attendance: 2,008; Referee: G. Connolly

29 April 2000 33	Gippsland Falcons	0–2	Canberra Cosmos	Morwell
		Report	de Jesus 45'; Clark 53'	Stadium: Mobil Park; Attendance: 1,688; Referee: B. Zetter

7 May 2000 34	Canberra Cosmos	1–1	Marconi Fairfield	Canberra
	Clark 83'	Report	Vargas 30'	Stadium: Bruce Stadium; Attendance: 2,586; Referee: J. Blaney

== Statistics ==
=== Appearances and goals ===
Players with no appearances not included in the list.

No.	Pos.	Nat.	Name	National Soccer League		Total	
No.	Pos.	Nat.	Name	Apps	Goals	Apps	Goals
2	FW	(Australia)	David Milin	17(7)	2	24	2
3	DF	(Australia)	Toplica Popovich	27(5)	2	32	2
4	DF	(Australia)	Danny Burt	18(1)	3	19	3
5	DF	(Australia)	Nick Purdue	8(9)	1	17	1
6	MF	(Australia)	Jason Polak	32	3	32	3
7	DF	(Scotland)	David Winnie	23	1	23	1
8	FW	(Australia)	Daniel Watkins	21(8)	6	29	6
9	MF	(Australia)	Alex Castro	8(2)	1	10	1
10	FW	(Australia)	Michael Musitano	7(8)	1	15	1
11	MF	(Australia)	David Arranz	17(3)	2	20	2
12	MF	(Scotland)	Brian Hamilton	26(1)	1	27	1
14	FW	(Australia)	Harry James	25(3)	1	28	1
15	FW	(Australia)	Glenn Kolpak	9(12)	0	21	0
16	MF	(Australia)	Ilija Prenzoski	5(13)	0	18	0
17	DF	(Australia)	Robert Hooker	31(1)	0	32	0
19	MF	(Australia)	Geoff Howarth	0(1)	0	1	0
20	GK	(Australia)	Grant Below	21	0	21	0
21	MF	(Australia)	Scott Conlon	0(1)	0	1	0
22	DF	(Australia)	Elliot Zwangobani	3	0	3	0
23	DF	(Australia)	Andrew Clark	11(2)	5	13	5
24	DF	(Australia)	Paul Roberts	19(1)	1	20	1
25	MF	(Australia)	Ivo de Jesus	21(7)	12	28	12
26	MF	(Australia)	Gabriel Gonzalez	15(4)	2	19	2
30	GK	(Australia)	Angelo Konstantinou	13	0	13	0

=== Clean sheets ===
Rank	No.	Pos	Nat	Name	National Soccer League	Total
1	20	GK	(Australia)	Grant Barlow	4	4
2	30	GK	(Australia)	Angelo Konstantinou	1	1
Total					5	5
