= 1996–97 Canberra Cosmos FC season =

Canberra Cosmos
1996–97 season
- Manager: Mick Lyons
- Stadium: Bruce Stadium; Seiffert Oval
- National Soccer League: 14th
- NSL Cup: Round of 16
- Top goalscorer: League: Norman Kelly (7); All: Norman Kelly (8)
- Highest home attendance: 9,421 vs. Newcastle Breakers (1 November 1996); National Soccer League
- Lowest home attendance: 1,000 vs. Brisbane Strikers (14 December 1996); National Soccer League; 1,000 vs. Adelaide City (29 March 1997); National Soccer League
- Average home league attendance: 2,946
- Biggest win: 4–1 vs. Perth Glory (H) (22 February 1997); National Soccer League
- Biggest defeat: 0–6 vs. Perth Glory (A) (3 November 1996); National Soccer League

The 1996–97 season was the second in the history of Canberra Cosmos. It was also the second season in the National Soccer League. In addition to the domestic league, they also participated in the NSL Cup. Canberra Cosmos finished 14th in their National Soccer League season, and were eliminated in the NSL Cup Round of 16 by Melbourne Knights.

== Players ==
Note: Flags indicate national team as defined under FIFA eligibility rules; some limited exceptions apply. Players may hold more than one non-FIFA nationality.

No.	Pos.	Nation	Player
1	GK	AUS	Danny Milosevic
2	MF	AUS	Paul Dee
3	FW	AUS	David Milin
4	DF	AUS	Richard Watson
5	MF	AUS	Mladen Rogic
6	MF	AUS	Paul Wade
7	MF	AUS	Michael Garcia
8	MF	NIR	Norman Kelly
9	MF	AUS	Lachlan Armstrong
10	FW	AUS	Tony Lemezina
11	FW	AUS	Marko Perinovic (Captain)
12	DF	AUS	Lindsay Wilson
13	FW	AUS	Peter Buljan
14	MF	AUS	James Baxter
15	MF	AUS	Vince Grella
16	FW	AUS	Steve Lazzari

No.	Pos.	Nation	Player
17		AUS	Steven Howe
18	MF	AUS	Joe Campagna
19		AUS	Alex Tsiokos
20	GK	AUS	Ben Harris
21	DF	AUS	John Koch
22	DF	AUS	Peter Mazis
24	DF	AUS	George Sorras
25	DF	AUS	Ante Juric
26	MF	AUS	Rodrigo Moreno
30	GK	AUS	Anthony Giannasca
—	FW	AUS	John Markovski
—	MF	AUS	Allan Reis
—	GK	AUS	Barney Smith
—	DF	AUS	Jason Dunn
—	DF	AUS	Toplica Popovich
—	MF	AUS	Andrew Ravanello

== Competitions ==
=== Overview ===
Competition	First match	Last match	Starting round	Final position	Record							
Competition	First match	Last match	Starting round	Final position	Pld	W	D	L	GF	GA	GD	Win %
National Soccer League	12 October 1996	20 April 1997	Matchday 1	14th	26	2	5	19	30	69	−39	7.69
NSL Cup	7 September 1996	13 September 1996	Round of 16	Round of 16	2	0	0	2	2	4	−2	0.00
Total					28	2	5	21	32	73	−41	7.14

Last updated: complete
Source: Competitions

=== National Soccer League ===
==== League table ====
Pos	Team	Pld	W	D	L	GF	GA	GD	Pts	Qualification
1	Sydney United	26	17	5	4	67	33	+34	56	Qualification for the Finals series
2	Brisbane Strikers (C)	26	15	2	9	55	40	+15	47	Qualification for the Finals series
3	South Melbourne	26	14	4	8	39	25	+14	46	Qualification for the Finals series
4	Adelaide City	26	11	10	5	32	22	+10	43	Qualification for the Finals series
5	Marconi Fairfield	26	12	4	10	41	37	+4	40	Qualification for the Finals series
6	Melbourne Knights	26	11	6	9	36	32	+4	39	Qualification for the Finals series
7	Perth Glory	26	11	5	10	48	41	+7	38	
8	West Adelaide	26	10	3	13	39	51	−12	33	
9	UTS Olympic	26	8	8	10	41	46	−5	32	
10	Wollongong Wolves	26	8	8	10	42	48	−6	32	
11	Newcastle Breakers	26	7	9	10	40	46	−6	30	
12	Gippsland Falcons	26	8	6	12	33	41	−8	30	
13	Collingwood Warriors	26	6	9	11	32	44	−12	27	
14	Canberra Cosmos	26	2	5	19	30	69	−39	11	

Updated to match(es) played on unknown. Source: rsssf.com
Rules for classification: 1) points; 2) goal difference; 3) number of goals scored.
(C) Champions

==== Results by round ====
Round	1	2	3	4	5	6	7	8	9	10	11	12	13	14	15	16	17	18	19	20	21	22	23	24	25	26
Ground	H	A	H	A	A	H	A	H	A	H	A	H	A	H	A	H	A	H	H	A	H	A	H	A	H	A
Result	L	L	L	L	D	D	D	L	L	L	L	W	D	L	L	L	L	W	D	L	L	L	L	L	L	L
Position	11	13	14	14	14	14	14	14	14	14	14	14	14	14	14	14	14	14	14	14	14	14	14	14	14	14

Source: worldfootball.net
A = Away; H = Home; W = Win; D = Draw; L = Loss

==== Matches ====
12 October 1996 1	Canberra Cosmos	2–3	Marconi Fairfield	Canberra
	Kelly 11'; Perinovic 86'	Report	Zoric 14'; Foster 34'; Babic 49'	Stadium: Bruce Stadium; Attendance: 3,500; Referee: G. Leverton

20 October 1996 2	UTS Olympic	1–0	Canberra Cosmos	Sydney
	Tome 9'	Report		Stadium: Belmore Sports Ground; Attendance: 7,428; Referee: C. Diomis

25 October 1996 3	Canberra Cosmos	1–3	West Adelaide	Canberra
	Kelly 45'	Report	Thorp 1', 56'; Borghetto 84'	Stadium: Bruce Stadium; Attendance: 2,651; Referee: M. Breeze

3 November 1996 4	Perth Glory	6–0	Canberra Cosmos	Perth
	McVittie 19'; Despotovski 31', 87'; Wingell 32'; Naven 67'; Miller 80'	Report		Stadium: Perth Oval; Attendance: 8,053; Referee: B. Panella

1 November 1996 19	Canberra Cosmos	1–1	Newcastle Breakers	Canberra
	Dee 90'	Report	Zane 74'	Stadium: Bruce Stadium; Attendance: 9,421; Referee: M. Breeze

8 November 1996 5	Newcastle Breakers	2–2	Canberra Cosmos	Newcastle
	Halpin 33'; Sprod 46'	Report	Buljan 18'; Koch 68'	Stadium: Breakers Stadium; Attendance: 3,107; Referee: D. Crawford

16 November 1996 6	Canberra Cosmos	2–2	Collingwood Warriors	Canberra
	Kelly 64' (pen.); Wilson 90'	Report	Taliadoros 30'; MacNicol 49'	Stadium: Bruce Stadium; Attendance: 2,600; Referee: M. Shield

23 November 1996 7	Gippsland Falcons	0–0	Canberra Cosmos	Morwell
		Report		Stadium: Falcons Park; Attendance: 2,667; Referee: J. Markovski

30 November 1996 8	Canberra Cosmos	1–3	Sydney United	Canberra
	Dee 23'	Report	Milicic 34'; Rudan 57'; Zdrilic 82'	Stadium: Bruce Stadium; Attendance: 3,500; Referee: W. Dade

8 December 1996 9	Adelaide City	1–0	Canberra Cosmos	Adelaide
	Tobin 62'	Report		Stadium: Hindmarsh Stadium; Attendance: 3,323; Referee: B. Panella

14 December 1996 10	Canberra Cosmos	1–4	Brisbane Strikers	Canberra
	Kelly 30' (pen.)	Report	Hunter 4' (pen.), 49' (pen.); Farina 60'; Brown 65'	Stadium: Bruce Stadium; Attendance: 1,000; Referee: G. Leverton

20 December 1996 11	Wollongong City	2–1	Canberra Cosmos	Wollongong
	Perinich 50'; Horsley 81'	Report	Lemezina 79'	Stadium: Brandon Park; Attendance: 3,467; Referee: B. Hugo

28 December 1996 12	Canberra Cosmos	1–0	South Melbourne	Canberra
	Dee 20'	Report		Stadium: Bruce Stadium; Attendance: 1,600; Referee: S. Micallef

5 January 1997 13	Melbourne Knights	1–1	Canberra Cosmos	Melbourne
	A. Cervinski 45'	Report	Perinovic 83'	Stadium: Somers St Stadium; Attendance: 2,980; Referee: E. Lennie

11 January 1997 14	Canberra Cosmos	2–4	Melbourne Knights	Canberra
	Sorras 22'; Kelly 67' (pen.)	Report	Kutlesovski 4', 53'; A. Cervinski 61', 76'	Stadium: Bruce Stadium; Attendance: 3,127; Referee: G. Connolly

1 February 1997 15	Marconi Fairfield	1–0	Canberra Cosmos	Sydney
	Maloney 79'	Report		Stadium: Marconi Stadium; Attendance: 4,279; Referee: C. Diomis

8 February 1997 16	Canberra Cosmos	0–2	UTS Olympic	Canberra
		Report	Emerton 73'; Ardone 88'	Stadium: Bruce Stadium; Attendance: 3,000; Referee: B. Hugo

16 February 1997 17	West Adelaide	4–1	Canberra Cosmos	Adelaide
	Aloisi 52', 79'; Tsekinis 90'; Alagich 90+3'	Report	Lemezina 85'	Stadium: Hindmarsh Stadium; Attendance: 3,800; Referee: B. Tanella

22 February 1997 18	Canberra Cosmos	4–1	Perth Glory	Canberra
	Kelly 9'; Armstrong 50'; Dee 66'; Markovski 75'	Report	Despotovski 42'	Stadium: Bruce Stadium; Attendance: 2,000; Referee: E. Brazzale

10 March 1997 20	Collingwood Warriors	6–2	Canberra Cosmos	Melbourne
	Vlahos 37', 82'; Boutsianis 44', 55'; Di Iorio 65'; Taliadoros 89'	Report	Armstrong 33', 88'	Stadium: Victoria Park; Attendance: 3,320; Referee: W. Dade

15 March 1997 21	Canberra Cosmos	2–4	Gippsland Falcons	Canberra
	Kelly 46' (pen.); Lemezina 89'	Report	Palamaras 25'; Foy 52'; Sekulic 71'; Thompson 88'	Stadium: Bruce Stadium; Attendance: 1,800; Referee: W. Dade

23 March 1997 22	Sydney United	7–2	Canberra Cosmos	Sydney
	Zdrilic 3', 49', 67', 89'; Moric 38'; Kupresak 46'; Genc 73'	Report	Markovski 39'; Mazis 40'	Stadium: Edensor Park; Attendance: 4,026; Referee: M. Shield

29 March 1997 23	Canberra Cosmos	0–1	Adelaide City	Canberra
		Report	Mennillo 81'	Stadium: Bruce Stadium; Attendance: 1,000; Referee: G. Leverton

5 April 1997 24	Brisbane Strikers	3–1	Canberra Cosmos	Brisbane
	Farina 41', 85'; Hunter 58'	Report	Baxter 87'	Stadium: Suncorp Stadium; Attendance: 3,974; Referee: E. Brazzale

12 April 1997 25	Canberra Cosmos	2–4	Wollongong City	Queanbeyan
	Buljan 17'; Grella 75'	Report	Dimoski 2', 56'; Horsley 5'; Chipperfield 60'	Stadium: Seiffert Oval; Attendance: 3,014; Referee: S. Micallef

20 April 1997 26	South Melbourne	3–1	Canberra Cosmos	Melbourne
	Curcija 55'; Trimboli 74', 76'	Report	Buljan 90'	Stadium: Lakeside Stadium; Attendance: 7,896; Referee: M. Shield

=== NSL Cup ===
7 September 1996 Round of 16 (1st Leg)	Canberra Cosmos	1–2	Melbourne Knights	Canberra
	Armstrong 61'	Report	Pondeljak 65'; Markovski 85'	Stadium: Bruce Stadium; Referee: C. Diomis

13 September 1996 Round of 16 (2nd Leg)	Melbourne Knights	2–1	Canberra Cosmos	Melbourne
	Pondeljak 57'; Markovski 72' (pen.)	Report	Kelly 90' (pen.)	Stadium: Knights Park; Referee: G. Connolly

== Statistics ==
=== Appearances and goals ===
Players with no appearances not included in the list.

No.	Pos.	Nat.	Name	National Soccer League		NSL Cup		Total	
No.	Pos.	Nat.	Name	Apps	Goals	Apps	Goals	Apps	Goals
1	GK	(Australia)	Danny Milosevic	13	0	2	0	15	0
2	MF	(Australia)	Paul Dee	23	4	0	0	23	4
3	FW	(Australia)	David Milin	7(7)	0	2	0	16	0
4	DF	(Australia)	Richard Watson	11(1)	0	2	0	14	0
5	MF	(Australia)	Mladen Rogic	3(1)	0	2	0	6	0
6	MF	(Australia)	Paul Wade	17	0	0	0	17	0
7	MF	(Australia)	Michael Garcia	16	0	2	0	18	0
8	MF	(Northern Ireland)	Norman Kelly	23	7	2	1	25	8
9	MF	(Australia)	Lachlan Armstrong	18(2)	2	2	1	22	3
10	FW	(Australia)	Tony Lemezina	4(9)	3	1	0	14	3
11	FW	(Australia)	Marko Perinovic	8	2	0	0	8	2
12	DF	(Australia)	Lindsay Wilson	9(1)	1	2	0	12	1
13	FW	(Australia)	Peter Buljan	10(6)	3	2	0	18	3
14	MF	(Australia)	James Baxter	12(6)	1	0(1)	0	19	1
15	MF	(Australia)	Vince Grella	11(3)	1	1	0	15	1
16	FW	(Australia)	Steve Lazzari	2(2)	0	0	0	4	0
17		(Australia)	Steven Howe	0(1)	0	0	0	1	0
18	MF	(Australia)	Joe Campagna	0(3)	0	0	0	3	0
21	DF	(Australia)	John Koch	24(1)	1	2	0	27	1
22	DF	(Australia)	Peter Mazis	19	1	0	0	19	1
24	DF	(Australia)	George Sorras	18(1)	2	0	0	19	2
25	DF	(Australia)	Ante Juric	9(1)	0	0	0	10	0
26	MF	(Australia)	Rodrigo Moreno	9	0	0	0	9	0
30	GK	(Australia)	Anthony Giannasca	11	0	0	0	11	0
—	DF	(Australia)	John Angelovski	0	0	1	0	1	0
—	FW	(Australia)	John Markovski	7	2	0	0	7	2
—	MF	(Australia)	Allan Reis	0(1)	0	0	0	1	0
—	GK	(Australia)	Barney Smith	2	0	0	0	2	0

=== Clean sheets ===
Rank	No.	Pos	Nat	Name	National Soccer League	NSL Cup	Total
1	1	GK	(Australia)	Danny Milosevic	1	0	1
1	30	GK	(Australia)	Anthony Giannasca	1	0	1
Total					2	0	2
