= List of Canberra Cosmos FC seasons =

Canberra City Football Club was an Australian semi-professional association football club based in Canberra. The club was formed in 1995 and joined the National Soccer League in the 1995–96 season until they became defunct in September 2001. The club's first team spent six seasons in the National Soccer League. The table details the club's achievements in major competitions, and the top scorers for each season.

== History ==
For Canberra Cosmos' first season in existence; it included an 8 game winless start and finish of 9th out of 12 (the club's best finish) while also finishing in the semi-finals of the NSL Cup from South Melbourne. The next season in 1996–97 only involved two wins out of 26 matches played in the NSL campaign, finishing with 11 points in last place. New manager recruits of Branko Culina and Rale Rasic resulted in another last place finish in the 1997–98 season and was the start of a 23 match winless streak whilst the NSL Cup had been disbanded from that season onwards. Only the next season in 1998–99 which involved a huge winless start until they won against the Newcastle Breakers in January 1999 to end their longest winless streak but still finished in last place for the third consecutive season. Although the next NSL campaign for the 1999–2000 season didn't result in a last place finish for Cosmos, the club had finished 14th of 16 teams. The final season of the club's existence in 2000–01 was a conceivably better season finishing 11th, while also meaning the club had never qualified for the Finals series of the National Soccer League. When Australia's football governing body Soccer Australia determined that the club had not met the required conditions of entry, the club of Canberra Cosmos became defunct in September 2001.

== Key ==
Key to league competitions:

- National Soccer League (NSL) – Australia's former top football league, established in 1977 and dissolved in 2004.

Key to colours and symbols:

1st or W	Winners
2nd or RU	Runners-up
3rd	Third place
♦	Top scorer in division

Key to league record:

- Season = The year and article of the season
- Pos = Final position
- Pld = Matches played
- W = Matches won
- D = Matches drawn
- L = Matches lost
- GF = Goals scored
- GA = Goals against
- Pts = Points

== Seasons ==
Results of league and cup competitions by season
Season	Division	Pld	W	D	L	GF	GA	Pts	Pos	Finals	NSL Cup	Name(s)	Goals
Season	League									Finals	NSL Cup	Top goalscorer(s)	
1995–96	NSL	33	8	11	14	48	61	35	9th	DNQ	SF	Paul Wade	11
1996–97	NSL	26	2	5	19	30	69	11	14th	DNQ	R1	Norman Kelly	8
1997–98	NSL	26	3	8	15	29	56	17	14th	DNQ	—	Peter Buljan	9
1998–99	NSL	28	4	3	21	21	55	15	15th	DNQ	—	Peter Buljan	9
1999–2000	NSL	34	9	9	16	44	64	36	14th	DNQ	—	Ivo de Jesus	12
2000–01	NSL	30	11	4	15	49	55	37	11th	DNQ	—	Alex Castro	10
