= List of National Soccer League players =

This is a list of National Soccer League players who made 300 or more appearances in the National Soccer League, the top level of the Australian soccer league system from 1977 to 2004.

From the National Soccer League's formation at the start of the 1977 season to its disbandment at the end of the 2003–04 season, one player accrued 500 or more appearances in the National Soccer League. The player to reach the milestone was defender Alex Tobin, in representation of Adelaide City, Parramatta Power and Northern Spirit; his 500th match was for Northern Spirit in February 2003.

The only player from outside the Australia to play 500 National Soccer League games is New Zealand forward Vaughan Coveny.

== List of players ==
Players are initially listed by number of appearances. If number of appearances are equal, the players are then listed chronologically by the year of first appearance. If still tied, the players are listed alphabetically.

Premier League players with at least 300 appearances
Name	Nationality	Position	Apps	Club(s)	First	Last
Alex Tobin	Australia	DF	522	Adelaide City, Parramatta Power, Northern Spirit	1984	2004
Paul Trimboli	Australia	FW	452	Sunshine, South Melbourne	1987	2004
Sergio Melta	Australia	MF	445	Adelaide City	1977	1995
Gary Meier	Australia	GK	412	Sydney Olympic	1977	1994
Damian Mori	Australia	FW	411	South Melbourne, Sunshine, Melbourne Knights, Adelaide City, Perth Glory	1989	2004
Mike O'Shea	Australia	DF	406	St George, Canberra City, Wollongong Wolves	1977	1996
Andrew Marth	Australia	MF	398	Sunshine, Melbourne Knights, Carlton	1986	2004
Robbie Hooker	Australia	DF	394	Sydney City, Sydney Olympic, West Adelaide, Sydney United, Marconi Stallions, Canberra Cosmos, Football Kingz	1986	2002
Theo Selemidis	Australia	MF	393	Heidelberg, Melbourne Knights	1977	1994
David Barrett	Australia	DF	389	Sydney City, Sydney Olympic, Sydney United, Parramatta Power	1986	2003
Gary Phillips	Australia	MF	377	Sydney Olympic, Brisbane Strikers	1982	1997
John Markovski	Australia	FW	372	Sunshine, Preston, Melbourne Knights, Marconi Stallions, Morwell, Canberra Cosmos, Carlton, Perth Glory, Football Kingz	1986	2002
Mehmet Duraković	Australia	DF	362	Brunswick, Footscray, South Melbourne, Sydney Olympic, Morwell	1985	2004
Danny Wright	Australia	FW	353	Brisbane Lions, South Melbourne, Brisbane Strikers	1980	1997
Graham Jennings	Australia	DF	351	Sydney Olympic, Sydney United, APIA Leichhardt, Newcastle Breakers	1979	1994
Matt Horsley	Australia	DF	347	Wollongong Wolves, Perth Glory	1990	2004
Rod Brown	Australia	FW	346	Marconi Stallions, APIA Leichhardt, Newcastle Breakers, Brisbane Strikers		
Bob Catlin	Australia	GK	345	APIA Leichhardt, Marconi Stallions, Sydney Olympic, Newcastle Breakers, Newcastle United	1984	2001
David Lowe	Australia	FW	345	Newcastle, Marconi Stallions, Parramatta Eagles, Newcastle Breakers		
Alan Hunter	Australia	DF	343	Brisbane Lions, Heidelberg, Sydney United, Parramatta Eagles, Brisbane Strikers, Carlton	1983	1998
Steve Blair	Australia	DF	338	South Melbourne	1980	1993
Joe Mullen	Australia	FW	333	Adelaide City	1983	1996
Matthew Bingley	Australia	DF	330	St George, Marconi Stallions, Northern Spirit, Newcastle United, Perth Glory	1988	2004
Vaughan Coveny	New Zealand	FW	306	Melbourne Knights, Wollongong Wolves, South Melbourne	1992	2004
Carl Veart	Australia	FW	307	Adelaide City, Adelaide United	1989	2004
Jason Petkovic	Australia	GK	301	Adelaide City, Perth Glory	1993	2004
Clint Bolton	Australia	GK	300	Brisbane Strikers, Sydney Olympic, Parramatta Power	1993	2004
