= List of Canberra Cosmos FC records and statistics =

Canberra Cosmos Football Club was an Australian semi-professional association football club based in Canberra. The club was formed and admitted into the National Soccer League in 1995. The club had never qualified for the Finals series in the National Soccer League in all six seasons of existence until they became defunct in September 2001.

The list encompasses the records set by the club, their managers and their players. The player records section itemises the club's leading goalscorers and those who have made most appearances in first-team competitions. It also records notable achievements by Canberra Cosmos players on the international stage. Attendance records in Canberra are also included.

The club's record appearance maker was Toplica Popovich, who made 126 appearances between 1995 and 2001. Peter Buljan was Canberra Cosmos' record goalscorer, scoring 21 goals in total.

== Player records ==
=== Appearances ===
- Most league appearances: Toplica Popovich, 123
- Most NSL Cup appearances: John Koch, 5

==== Most appearances ====
Competitive matches only, includes appearances as substitute. Numbers in brackets indicate goals scored.

Rank	Player	Years	National Soccer League	NSL Cup	Total
1	(Australia) Toplica Popovich	1995–2001	123 (4)	3 (0)	126 (4)
2	(Australia) Michael Musitano	1995–1996; 1997–2000	69 (8)	3 (0)	82 (8)
3	(Northern Ireland) Norman Kelly	1995–1999	77 (8)	2 (1)	79 (9)
4	(Australia) Paul Dee	1995–1998	71 (5)	3 (0)	74 (5)
5	(Australia) Peter Buljan	1996–1999	64 (21)	2 (0)	66 (21)
6	(Australia) Robbie Hooker	1999–2001	57 (2)	0 (0)	57 (2)
7	(Australia) Nick Purdue	1999–2001	56 (1)	0 (0)	56 (1)
8	(Australia) David Arranz	1998–2001	55 (2)	0 (0)	55 (2)
9	(Australia) Ilija Prenozski	1997–2001	53 (2)	0 (0)	53 (2)
10	(Australia) Alex Castro	1996; 1999–2001	51 (14)	1 (0)	52 (14)

=== Goalscorers ===
- Most goals in a season: Ivo de Jesus, 12 goals (in the 1999–2000 season)
- Most league goals in a season: Ivo de Jesus, 12 goals in the National Soccer League, 1999–2000

==== Top goalscorers ====
Peter Buljan was the all-time top goalscorer for Canberra Cosmos.

Competitive matches only. Numbers in brackets indicate appearances made.

Rank	Player	Years	National Soccer League	NSL Cup	Total
1	(Australia) Peter Buljan	1996–1999	21 (64)	0 (2)	21 (66)
2	(Australia) Ivo de Jesus	1999–2000	17 (42)	0 (0)	17 (42)
3	(Australia) Alex Castro	1978–1982	14 (51)	0 (1)	14 (52)
4	(Australia) Paul Wade	1995–1997	11 (43)	0 (2)	11 (45)
5	(Australia) Marko Perinovic	1995–1999	9 (40)	1 (3)	10 (43)
6	(Northern Ireland) Norman Kelly	1995–1999	8 (77)	1 (2)	9 (79)
7	(Australia) Michael Musitano	1995–1996; 1997–2000	8 (79)	0 (3)	8 (82)
7	(Australia) Tony Lemezina	1995–1997	7 (37)	1 (3)	8 (40)
9	(Australia) Lachlan Armstrong	1995–1999	6 (37)	1 (3)	7 (40)
9	(Australia) Jon Angelucci	2000–2001	7 (25)	0 (0)	7 (25)
9	(Uruguay) Milton Cortes	2000–2001	7 (18)	0 (0)	7 (18)

=== International ===
This section refers only to caps won while a Canberra Cosmos player.

- First capped player: Paul Wade, for Australia against New Zealand on 15 November 1995
- Most capped player: Paul Wade with 8 caps

== Club records ==
=== Matches ===
==== Firsts ====
- First National Soccer League match: Adelaide City 2–0 Canberra Cosmos, National Soccer League, 8 October 1995
- First NSL Cup match: West Adelaide 1–1 Canberra Cosmos, First round, 3 January 1996

==== Record wins ====
- Record NSL win: 8–1 against Sydney Olympic, National Soccer League, 5 January 1998
- Record NSL Cup win: 1–0 against West Adelaide, First round, 20 January 1996

==== Record defeats ====
- Record NSL defeat: 0–8 against Wollongong Wolves, National Soccer League, 5 December 1997
- Record NSL Cup defeat: 1–3 against South Melbourne, Semi-finals, 25 January 1996

==== Record consecutive results ====
- Record consecutive wins: 3, from 22 April 2000 to 29 April 2000
- Record consecutive defeats: 16, from 30 March 1998 to 10 January 1999
- Record consecutive draws: 3, from 23 January 2000 to 28 January 2000
- Record consecutive NSL matches without a defeat: 4, from 22 April 2000 to 7 May 2000
- Record consecutive matches without a win: 23, from 22 February 1998 to 24 January 1999

=== Goals ===
- Most NSL goals scored in a season: 49 in 30 matches, National Soccer League, 2000–01
- Fewest NSL goals scored in a season: 21 in 28 matches, National Soccer League, 1998–99
- Most NSL goals conceded in a season: 69 in 26 matches, National Soccer League, 1996–97
- Fewest NSL goals conceded in a season:
  - 55 in 28 matches, National Soccer League, 1998–99
  - 55 in 30 matches, National Soccer League, 2000–01

=== Points ===
- Most points in a season: 37 in 30 matches, National Soccer League, 2000–01
- Fewest points in a season: 11 in 26 matches, National Soccer League, 1996–97

=== Attendances ===
- Highest attendance at Canberra: 9,421, against Newcastle Breakers, National Soccer League, 1 November 1996
- Lowest attendance at Canberra:
  - 1,000 against Brisbane Strikers, National Soccer League, 14 December 1996
  - 1,000 against Adelaide City, National Soccer League, 29 March 1997
