= Steve Mautone =

Australian association footballer (born 1970)

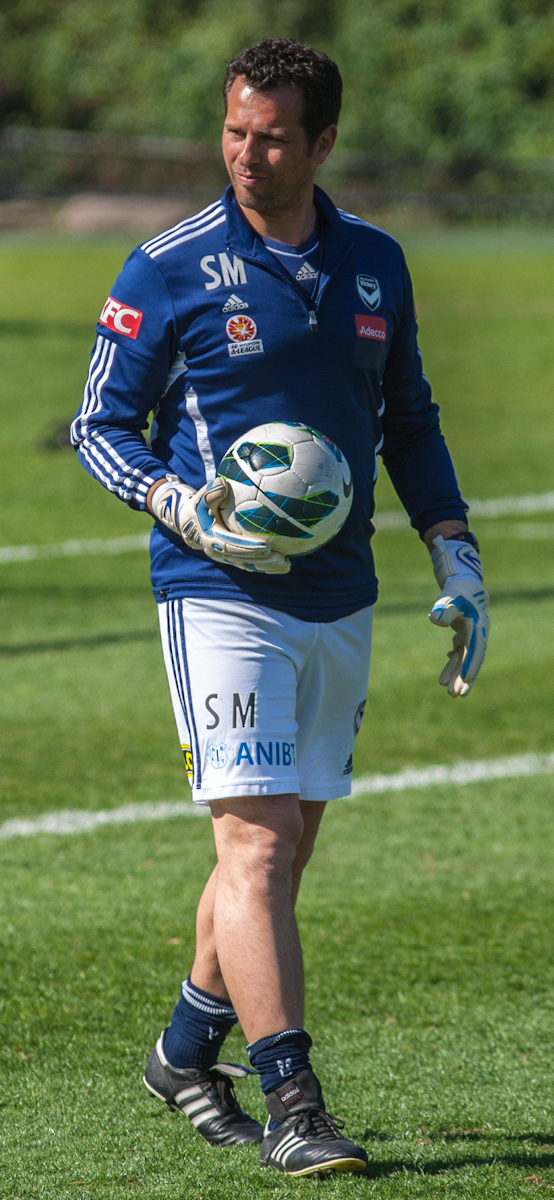
- Mautone in 2012

Personal information
- Full name: Steve Mautone
- Date of birth: 10 August 1970 (age 56)
- Place of birth: Myrtleford, Australia
- Position: Goalkeeper

Team information
- Current team: Melbourne Victory (assistant coach)

Youth career
- AIS

Senior career*
Years	Team	Apps	(Gls)
1989–1990	Blacktown City	8	(0)
1990–1991	Parramatta Eagles	2	(0)
1992–1994	Morwell Falcons	58	(0)
1994–1995	South Melbourne	18	(0)
1995–1996	Canberra Cosmos	20	(0)
1996–1997	West Ham United	1	(0)
1996	→ Crewe Alexandra (loan)	3	(0)
1997	→ Reading (loan)	15	(0)
1997–1999	Reading	14	(0)
1999	Wolverhampton Wanderers	0	(0)
1999	Crystal Palace	2	(0)
1999–2000	Gillingham	1	(0)
2000–2002	Slough Town	48	(0)
2008	Melbourne Victory	0	(0)
Total		190	(0)

International career
1990–1991	Australia U-23	2	(0)
- * Club domestic league appearances and goals

Stefano Mautone (born 10 August 1970) is an Australian association football coach with Melbourne Victory in the A-League. Mautone was initially recruited by Melbourne Victory to assume responsibility for training their goalkeepers Michael Theoklitos and Eugene Galekovic. He has been responsible for training and developing former Melbourne Victory goalkeepers Michael Petkovic, Sebastian Mattei, Michael Theoklitos, Eugene Galekovic, Glen Moss and Mitch Langerak whilst they were respectively playing at the Victory.

In 2008–09 and 2009–10 season, Mautone was assistant coach with Melbourne Victory's National Youth League team, working alongside Mehmet Durakovic.

== Club career ==
After completing a scholarship with the Australian Institute of Sport, Steve's professional career began quietly in 1989, when as an 18-year-old he made eight appearances for Blacktown City in the National Soccer League as an understudy to Bill Londos. He made the switch to Parramatta Eagles the following season, serving another apprenticeship to Alex McPherson. Mautone returned to regional Victoria in 1992, taking up a contract with Morwell Falcons, firstly in the Victorian Premier League in 1992, and ultimately securing the first team spot in the senior squad for the club's inaugural season in the National Soccer League.

In two seasons with the Gippsland-based club, Mautone proved outstanding, not missing a single league game, and his performances led to a move to Victorian rivals South Melbourne. The following season Mautone signed for the newly formed Canberra Cosmos, where he played 20 of 24 league games before a move to England with London-based Premier League club West Ham United beckoned.

Following a loan spell with Crewe Alexandra, he made his League debut for the Hammers in September 1996, keeping a clean sheet against Nottingham Forest. He was then loaned out to Reading, where he became a fans favourite, eventually signing for the club in March 1997 in a deal worth £250,000. He made 34 appearances in all competitions for Reading before eventually being released from his contract.

Mautone spent the 1999–2000 season making a handful of appearances at various clubs, including Wolverhampton Wanderers, Crystal Palace and Gillingham. He eventually moved to non-league Slough Town where he spent a couple of seasons and made over 50 appearances before eventually returning to Australia to pursue his coaching career.

== Coaching career ==
Mautone served as goalkeeping coach of Melbourne Victory for nine years, before departing on 22 May 2015 in order to spend more time with his young family.

== Honours ==
Gillingham

- Football League Second Division play-offs: 2000
