= Grant Barlow =

Australian soccer player and movement coach

Personal information
- Date of birth: 28 March 1980 (age 46)
- Place of birth: Australia
- Position: Goalkeeper

Youth career
- 1997–1998: Australian Institute of Sport

Senior career*
Years	Team	Apps	(Gls)
1998–2000	Canberra Cosmos FC	24	(0)
2000–20??	Wollongong City		
2001	→ Clementi Khalsa (loan)	16	(0)

International career
1997	Australia U17		
- * Club domestic league appearances and goals

Grant Barlow (born 28 March 1980) is an Australian movement coach and former soccer goalkeeper.

Loaned to Clementi Khalsa in June 2001, Barlow kept a clean sheet as Clementi Khalsa drew 0–0 with Tampines Rovers and was named man-of-the-match for his unblemished performances in the game. He has over 15 years of experience as a personal trainer and movement coach.
