= Michael Garcia (soccer) =

Australian soccer player (born 1977)

Personal information
- Date of birth: 22 March 1977 (age 49)
- Place of birth: Australia
- Position: Midfielder

Senior career*
Years	Team	Apps	(Gls)
-1997	Canberra Cosmos FC	27	(0)
1997–1999	Perth Glory FC	30	(4)
2000	Hougang United FC		
2001–2003	Perth Glory FC	27	(0)
Medal record
Representing Australia
Men's Association football
OFC U-20 Championship
Winner	1997 Tahiti
- * Club domestic league appearances and goals

Michael Garcia (born 22 March 1977 in Australia) is an Australian retired soccer player.

== Career ==
According to Garcia, "there was always banter between teammates about which state was the best” while he played for Canberra Cosmos.

After playing professionally in the Singaporean S.League, he rejoined Perth Glory, before retiring at the end of 2002/03 aged 25 due to injury.

He is currently the Community & Development Manager for Perth Glory.

== Honours ==
Australia U-20

- OFC U-19 Men's Championship: 1997
