= Anthony Magnacca =

Australian soccer player (born 1978)

Personal information
- Date of birth: 9 April 1978 (age 48)
- Place of birth: Melbourne, Australia
- Position: Midfielder

Senior career*
Years	Team	Apps	(Gls)
1997–1998	Sunshine Georgies		
1998–1999	Canberra Cosmos		
1999–2000	South Melbourne		
2000–2001	Newcastle United		
2001	→ Brann (loan)	1	(0)
2003–2004	Green Gully		
2005–2006	Preston Lions		
2007–2008	Sunshine Georgies		
2008	Coburg United		
2009	Heidelberg United		
2010	Bulleen Lions		
2011	Box Hill United		
- * Club domestic league appearances and goals

Anthony Magnacca (born 9 April 1978) is an Australian retired soccer player who played as a midfielder. He played in the Norwegian Premier League, his first professional stint, in 2001.

== Career ==
He made 57 appearances in the Australian A-League in the early stages of his career; 22 at Canberra Cosmos, 26 at the (then) South Melbourne Lakers and 9 at Newcastle United.

On trial with SK Brann of the Norwegian Premier League in 2001, Magnacca saw Brann as a springboard to a higher league upon transferring to the club and was received well, earning a salary of about 30000 kroner per month. He then made his league debut opposing Bodø/Glimt, in which Brann lost 5–1, after being praised by the coach for his assiduous efforts in a friendly. The Australian's debut would be his only appearance in his loan to Norway which lasted just two months.

He would not make any more professional appearances.
