= Ivan Zelic =

Australian soccer player (born 1978)

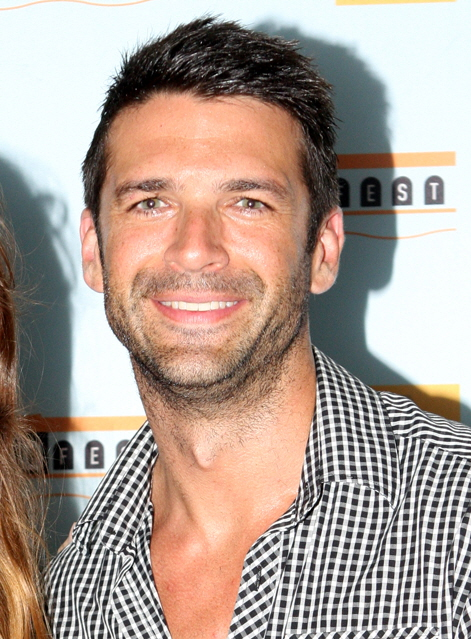
- Zelic in 2013

Personal information
- Date of birth: 24 February 1978 (age 48)
- Place of birth: Canberra, Australia
- Position: Defender

Youth career
- 1985–: Canberra FC
- 1994–1995: AIS

Senior career*
Years	Team	Apps	(Gls)
1995–1997	Sydney Olympic	24	(0)
1997–1999	Canberra Cosmos	33	(2)
1999–2000	Adelaide City	9	(0)
2000–2001	Melbourne Knights	5	(0)
2001–2002	Sydney United	13	(0)
2003	Johor FC		
2003–2005	St. George Saints		
2006	Blacktown City Demons		

International career^{‡}
1996–1997	Australia U-20		
1998–1999	Australia U-23		
Medal record
Representing Australia
Men's Association football
OFC U-20 Championship
Winner	1997 Tahiti
- * Club domestic league appearances and goals as of 17:30, 19 August 2010 (UTC) ‡ National team caps and goals as of 17:30, 19 August 2010 (UTC)

Ivan Zelic (born 24 February 1978) is an Australian writer, filmmaker, actor and former soccer player who played as a defender.

== Club career ==
Zelic was born to Croatian parents on 24 February 1978. He started playing football at the age of 7 for Canberra FC, a club known for developing Croatian-Australian football players. This included his older brother Ned Zelic and Croatian international player Josip Simuic.

Zelic received a scholarship to the Australian Institute of Sport (A.I.S) at the age of 16, where he was spotted by Sydney Olympic from the National Soccer League (NSL). He began playing in this professional league at the age of 17 as a defender in David Ratcliffe's side of 1995–96.

He then signed for Adelaide City on a two-year deal, leaving halfway through the second season to join the Melbourne Knights.

After finishing the season, Zelic returned home to play for Canberra FC, playing for the local side as a left sided midfielder as they won the minor premiership.

After a 9-month lay off through injury, he recovered and signed for Malaysian club Johor FC, where he spent a season.

=== International career ===
Zelic was a regular of the Australian Under 20s, or Young Socceroos, starting 11 leading up to and during the World Youth Cup in Malaysia in 1997.

After the World Youth Cup, he became the captain of the Australian Olympic team or Olyroos leading up to the Sydney 2000 Olympics but fell out of favor with Australian Olympic team coach Raul Blanco.

Blanco eventually invited Zelic to be part of the Olympic squad for the 2000 Olympics in Sydney, but Zelic declined the offer.

== Acting career ==
Zelic has guest starred in Australian shows including All Saints, Home and Away and Packed to the Rafters.

In 2015, he played the lead role in "Colt 13", a short film directed by Luke A. McKay, which played at numerous film festivals and earned Zelic a best actor award at the Sydney Indie Film Festival.

== Directing career ==
In 2008, Zelic wrote and directed his first short film, The Sin Bleeder, with cinematographer Marc Windon. The short film played at numerous short film festivals, including the Bondi Short Film Festival.

His follow-up, Ruthless Days, also appeared at a number of short film festivals across Australia, including the Melbourne Underground Film Festival.

== Personal life ==
Zelic is the younger brother of former Australian international footballer Ned Zelic and the older brother of former SBS football presenter Lucy Zelić.

== Honours ==
Australia U-20

- OFC U-19 Men's Championship: 1997
