= Zeljko Susa =

Australian footballer (born 1978)

Personal information
- Date of birth: 13 July 1978 (age 48)
- Place of birth: Australia
- Position: Defensive midfielder

Senior career*
Years	Team	Apps	(Gls)
1997–2000	Melbourne Knights FC	68	(7)
2000–2001	South Melbourne FC	23	(4)
2001–2002	HNK Hajduk Split	2	(1)
2002–2003	South Melbourne FC	9	(1)
- * Club domestic league appearances and goals

Zeljko Susa (born 13 July 1978 in Australia) is an Australian retired soccer player who played in the Australian National Soccer League (NSL) for Melbourne Knights and South Melbourne as well as for the Australian national football team. He made 17 appearances for the Socceroos from 1998 to 2003. Susa made his debut in Australia's 0–1 loss to Chile at Olympic Park, Melbourne on 7 February 1998. Susa received the opportunity to make a transfer to Deportivo Alavés in Spain, however the lucrative £500,000 offer was rejected by the Melbourne Knights Football Club. He had a short stint with Hajduk Split where he played twice, scoring one goal. Susa now works as a players agent, running his own business The Pitch Management from Australia, looking after some of Australia's top talents both experienced and young.
