= Ivan Kelic =

Australian soccer player

Personal information
- Date of birth: 29 December 1968 (age 57)
- Place of birth: Born at sea
- Position: Striker

Youth career
- Melbourne Knights
- St Albans Saints

Senior career*
Years	Team	Apps	(Gls)
- St Albans Saints
1989-1993	Melbourne Knights	106	(46)
1993-1994	Sydney Olympic	25	(14)
1994-1995	South Melbourne	43	(23)
1996	Tanjong Pagar United		
1996-1997	South Melbourne	25	(4)
1997-2000	Melbourne Knights	76	(31)
- * Club domestic league appearances and goals

Ivan Kelic (born 29 December 1968) is an Australian former soccer player who is last known to have played as a striker for Melbourne Knights.

== Career ==
Kelic was born at sea.

Before the 1989 season, he signed for Australian top flight side Melbourne Knights after playing for St Albans Saints in the Australian lower leagues.

Playing for Melbourne Knights, he was the league's equal top goal-scorer in the 1990/91 season with 17 goals. However, he missed with his penalty-kick and South Melbourne won the match and the title.

Before the 1996 season, he signed for Singaporean club Tanjong Pagar United.
