= Angelo Konstantinou =

Australian futsal player

Personal information
- Full name: Angelo Konstantinou
- Date of birth: 8 November 1978 (age 47)
- Position: Goalkeeper

Team information
- Current team: Canberra Olympic
- Number: 1

Senior career*
| Years | Team | Apps | (Gls) |
| 2011– | Canberra Olympic | 131 | (5) |

International career^{‡}
| 2016– | Australia (futsal) | 3 | (0) |
- * Club domestic league appearances and goals as of 31 December 2018 ‡ National team caps and goals as of 16 December 2016

Angelo Konstantinou (born 8 November 1978) is an Australian futsal goalkeeper who plays for Canberra Olympic in regulation 11 a side soccer as well as representing Australia with the Australia national futsal team. Unusually for a goalkeeper he is often Canberra Olympic's first choice penalty taker.

Konstantinou captained Canberra Olympic to the semi finals of the 2016 FFA Cup, scoring two penalties along the way.
