= Gordon Hunter (footballer, born 1967) =

Scottish footballer (born 1967)

Personal information
- Date of birth: 3 May 1967 (age 59)
- Place of birth: Wallyford, East Lothian, Scotland
- Position: Defender

Youth career
- Musselburgh Windsor

Senior career*
Years	Team	Apps	(Gls)
1983–1997	Hibernian	340	(7)
1997–1998	Canberra Cosmos	28	(2)
1998–1999	Dundee	3	(0)
1999	Cowdenbeath	2	(1)
1999–2000	Hamilton Academical	22	(1)
2000–2001	Stirling Albion	5	(0)

International career
1986–1988	Scotland U21	3	(0)
- * Club domestic league appearances and goals

Gordon Hunter (born 3 May 1967) is a Scottish former footballer, who played as a defender for Hibernian, Canberra Cosmos, Dundee, Cowdenbeath, Hamilton Academical and Stirling Albion.

Hunter was part of the Hibernian team that won the 1991 Scottish League Cup Final (also playing on the losing side in the final of the same competition in 1985 and 1993); he was granted a testimonial match by the club in 1996 having made 409 appearances over 14 seasons. Hunter, who scored very few goals in his career, got the winner for Hibs in an Edinburgh derby match in 1994 that ended a record 22-game unbeaten run by Heart of Midlothian in the derby.

As of 2005, Hunter ran a taxi business in Edinburgh.
