= Lindsay Wilson (soccer) =

Australian soccer player

Personal information
- Date of birth: 4 May 1979 (age 47)
- Place of birth: Sydney, Australia
- Height: 6 ft 1 in (1.85 m)
- Position: Defender

Senior career*
Years	Team	Apps	(Gls)
1996–1999	Canberra Cosmos	48	(2)
1999–2002	Sydney Olympic	82	(5)
2002–2006	PSV	0	(0)
2003–2004	→ Volendam (loan)	26	(0)
2004–2005	→ Helmond Sport (loan)	27	(2)
2006	→ Kilmarnock (loan)	13	(0)
Total		196	(9)

International career
1998–1999	Australia U20	8	(0)
2001	Australia	2	(0)
Medal record
Representing Australia
Men's Association football
OFC U-20 Championship
Winner	1998 Samoa
- * Club domestic league appearances and goals

Lindsay Wilson (born 5 April 1979) is an Australian former international soccer player who played professionally in Australia, the Netherlands, and Scotland, as a defender. Wilson made a total of 196 league career appearances, and scored nine league goals.

== Career ==
=== Club career ===
Born in Sydney, Wilson began his career in his native Australia for Canberra Cosmos and Sydney Olympic between 1996 and 2002. He then moved to the Netherlands to play with PSV Eindhoven, where he spent loan spells at FC Volendam and Helmond Sport, as well as Scottish side Kilmarnock. At Kilmarnock, Wilson made 13 appearances in the Scottish Premier League. After leaving PSV, Wilson trialled with English side Derby County and Scottish side Dundee United.

=== International career ===
Wilson earned 8 caps for the Australian under-20 team in 1998 and 1999.

Wilson won two caps for the Australian national team in 2001, both of which came in FIFA World Cup qualifying matches.

== Honours ==
Australia U-20

- OFC U-19 Men's Championship: 1998
