= Jason Polak =

Australian soccer player

Personal information
- Full name: Jason Polak
- Date of birth: 9 January 1968 (age 58)
- Position: Midfielder

Youth career
- 1985–1987: Watford F.C.

Senior career*
Years	Team	Apps	(Gls)
1987–1989	Sydney Olympic	14	(0)
1989–1990	Panathinaikos	3	(0)
1991–1992	De Graafschap	17	(0)
1994–1995	South Melbourne	21	(2)
1995–1996	Brisbane Strikers	27	(1)
1996–1999	South Melbourne	56	(5)
1999–2000	Canberra Cosmos	23	(3)

International career
1988–1996	Australia	32	(2)
Medal record
Representing Australia
Men's Association football
OFC Nations Cup
Winner	1996 Oceania
- * Club domestic league appearances and goals

Jason Polak (born 9 January 1968) is an Australian former association football player.

== Playing career ==
=== Club career ===
Polak began his National Soccer League career with Sydney Olympic in 1989 after having spent three years at the Australian Institute of Sport. In the 1989/90 season, Polak spent time with Greek club Panathinaikos. He played as a centre midfielder and left midfielder. He also played as an attacker.

=== International career ===
In 1985, Polak was selected for an Australian Schoolboys team to tour the United Kingdom, however he did not tour.

In 1987, Polak played three matches for the Australia national under-20 football team at the 1987 FIFA World Youth Championship.

Polak made his debut for the Australia national association football team in 1988 against Fiji in Newcastle. He played his last match in 1996 in Australia's defeat of Tahiti in the second leg of the 1996 OFC Nations Cup final in Canberra.

In 1989, Polak made three appearances for the Australia national futsal team at the 1989 FIFA Futsal World Championship.

International goals
No.	Date	Venue	Opponent	Score	Result	Competition
1	12 June 1994	Sydney Football Stadium (1988), Sydney, Australia	South Africa	1	1–0	Friendly
2	21 September 1996	Pretoria, South Africa	Kenya	1	4–0	Friendly

== Honours ==
Australia

- OFC Nations Cup: 1996
