= Norman Tome =

Australian soccer player

Personal information
- Full name: Norman Tome
- Date of birth: 20 March 1973 (age 53)
- Place of birth: Australia
- Position: Striker

Senior career*
Years	Team	Apps	(Gls)
1992	Dulwich Hill		
1993–1994	Bonnyrigg White Eagles	41	(18)
1993–2000	Sydney Olympic	172	(53)
2000–2002	Marconi Stallions	39	(6)
2002–2003	Bankstown City Lions	7	(1)
2002–2005	A.P.I.A. Leichhardt Tigers	35	(12)
2005–2010	Dulwich Hill		
- * Club domestic league appearances and goals as of 13 August 2007

Norman Tome (born 20 March 1973) is an Australian soccer player who represented Australia at the 1996 Atlanta Olympics.
