= Falcons 2000 SC =

Falcons 2000 Soccer Club (Morwell Falcons)
- Full name: Falcons 2000 Soccer Club Inc; Former Club Known As: Morwell Falcons; Gippsland Falcons (logo above); Eastern Pride
- Nicknames: Falcons, Falcioni, Morwell Falcons
- Founded: 2001 as Falcons 2000; Italian Australian Social Club of Gippsland 1961; Name Change to Morwell Falcons 1964 (Via Sponsorship)
- Dissolved: 2001 as Eastern Pride; Gippsland Falcons (1996 to 00); Morwell Falcons (1964 to 1996)
- Ground: Latrobe City Stadium; Owned by Latrobe City Council
- Capacity: 12,000 (1,912 Seats); Morwell Falcons Record Attendance: 8,256 - Round 18 1993-94 NSL Season
- Chairman: Tony Salvatore
- Manager: Adrian Salvatore
- League: Latrobe Valley Soccer League
- 2024: 1st
- Website: www.falcons2000.com.au
Home colours	Away colours

Falcons 2000 Soccer Club (formerly Morwell Falcons, Gippsland Falcons and Eastern Pride) is an Australian semi-professional soccer club based in the regional Victorian city of Morwell in Latrobe Valley, Gippsland. The club currently participates in the Latrobe Valley Soccer League, currently rated as a Tier 9 league.

As Morwell Falcons, the club achieved the rare feat of promotion to Tier 1 status in the Australian National Soccer League from what is described now as the Tier 9 Latrobe Valley Soccer League, via promotions in the Australian Association Football pyramid between 1973 and 1992 when promotion to the highest tier was available.

== Origins ==
Originally Founded in 1961 by the local Latrobe Valley Italian-Indigenous Community. Known as Morwell Falcons starting 1964 due to a sponsorship arrangement with Ford Motor Company. The club participated in the Latrobe Valley Soccer League between 1961 and 1973. Then the Victorian State League Football System at all levels between 1974 and 1992. Morwell Falcons were admitted to the National Soccer League in 1992-93 where it competed until folding after relegation in 2000–01. It was re-established as Falcons 2000 SC Inc in 2001. Since its inception the club has played under multiple names. Including Morwell Falcons, then Gippsland Falcons SC, before folding under the name Eastern Pride in 2001. The club bears its present name Falcons 2000 after its financial re-establishment

The Falcons were one of the most successful clubs in the Gippsland region of Victoria, Australia. Gippsland is all of South-East Victoria and some surrounding areas, approximately the same size as Switzerland. Morwell Falcons were Champions of the Victorian State League on two occasions, winning the State League Championship and League Finals Cup double in 1984 and 1989, and the Statewide Dockerty Cup in 1994.

Morwell Falcons were the only club based in regional Victoria to have participated at National Soccer League level before the NSL disbanded in 2003–04. The NSL was replaced with the A-League Men in 2005–06, making the new Tier 1 exclusively for licensed teams only, with no promotion and relegation.

Morwell Falcons major difficulty was the location of Latrobe City Stadium at Crinigan Road, Morwell. The stadium itself was too far distant from Morwell Train Station for any serious attendance by public transport users who would have walked to the stadium from the train station. The club attracted competitive and sustainable attendances relatively speaking compared to other clubs, and had a large local following when in the National Soccer League via people watching the Australian National television coverage, including highlights and live games, on SBS. The club was also featured in the sports sections of the local newspapers. That included the Latrobe Valley Express, delivered free to every household in the Latrobe City Council area (where applicable).

== From the Bottom Tier of the Victorian State League to the National Soccer League ==
Morwell entered the Victorian State League System in Tier 7 in 1974, after winning the Latrobe Valley Soccer League Championship for the second time in 3 years.

=== Victorian Provisional League ===
The Falcons were an instant success in the 7th Tier Victorian Provisional League, winning two consecutive Championships in 1974 and 1975, making it 4 championships in 5 seasons. The team was finally promoted to the Tier 6 Victorian Metropolitan Soccer League Division 4 after a runner-up finish in its third season in the Victorian Provisional League in 1976.

1974 Victorian Provisional League Table (Tier 7)
Pos	Team	P	W	L	D	GF	GA	GD	Pts	Result
1	Morwell Falcons (C)	22	15	3	4	60	27	33	33	Champions
2	Geelong	22	14	4	4	62	28	34	32	
3	Fawkner	22	14	4	4	62	28	34	32	
4	Werribee	22	15	2	5	46	29	17	32	

1975 Victorian Provisional League Table (Tier 7)
Pos	Team	P	W	L	D	GF	GA	GD	Pts	Result
1	Morwell Falcons (C)	22	16	4	2	71	19	52	36	Champions
2	Fawkner	22	17	2	3	70	37	33	36	
3	Geelong	22	12	5	5	50	36	14	29	
4	Werribee	22	10	4	8	48	29	19	24	

1976 Victorian Provisional League Table (Tier 7)
Pos	Team	P	W	L	D	GF	GA	GD	Pts	Result
1	Geelong (C)	22	13	6	3	69	24	45	32	Champions
2	Morwell Falcons (P)	22	14	3	5	80	31	49	31	Promoted
3	Fawkner	22	14	3	5	45	23	22	31	
4	Frankston	22	11	8	3	56	35	21	30	

=== Victorian Metropolitan Leagues ===
Morwell Falcons were promoted in the Victorian State League part of the "Pyramid" 5 times in 6 years between 1976 and 1981. The Falcons first 4 seasons (of 5) in the Victorian Metropolitan Football League system produced a worst season finish of 3rd. The Falcons progressed from the Tier 6 Victorian Metropolitan Football League Division 4, to the Tier 3 Victorian Metropolitan Football League Division 1, via 3 Runners-Up promotions in 4 seasons.

1977 Victorian Metropolitan League Division 4 (Tier 6)
Pos	Team	P	W	L	D	GF	GA	GD	Pts	Result
1	Doncaster (C)	22	18	3	1	59	20	39	39	Champions
2	Morwell Falcons (P)	22	17	0	5	67	22	45	34	Promoted
3	Sandringham	22	14	2	6	52	33	19	30	
4	Clayton	22	9	6	7	41	35	6	24	

1979 Victorian Metropolitan League Division 3 (Tier 5)
Pos	Team	P	W	L	D	GF	GA	GD	Pts	Result
1	Park Rangers (C)	22	17	3	2	63	22	41	37	Champions
2	Morwell Falcons (P)	22	15	3	4	51	20	31	33	Promoted
3	Fawkner	22	12	4	6	46	27	19	28	
4	Cloburg	22	9	6	7	42	39	3	24	

1980 Victorian Metropolitan League Division 2 (Tier 4)
Pos	Team	P	W	L	D	GF	GA	GD	Pts	Result
1	Park Rangers (C)	22	16	4	2	43	15	28	36	Champions
2	Morwell Falcons (P)	22	15	3	4	58	24	34	33	Promoted
3	Knox City	22	9	7	6	31	29	2	25	
4	Heidelberg United	22	8	6	8	34	30	4	22	

1981 was the Falcons only season competing in the Victorian Metropolitan Football League Division 1. The team finished 9th, but was promoted to the Tier 2 Victorian State League regardless, due to a restructuring of the league system.

Between 1971 and 1980 the Morwell Falcons finished no lower than 3rd in 10 consecutive seasons in 5 divisions. Results included 9 seasons in the top 2, 4 Championships, and 5 Runners-Up finishes (4 resulting in promotion). It included 3 Championships in a row in 1973-74-75. The team achieved promotion to the next Tier 5 times in 8 season during this period.

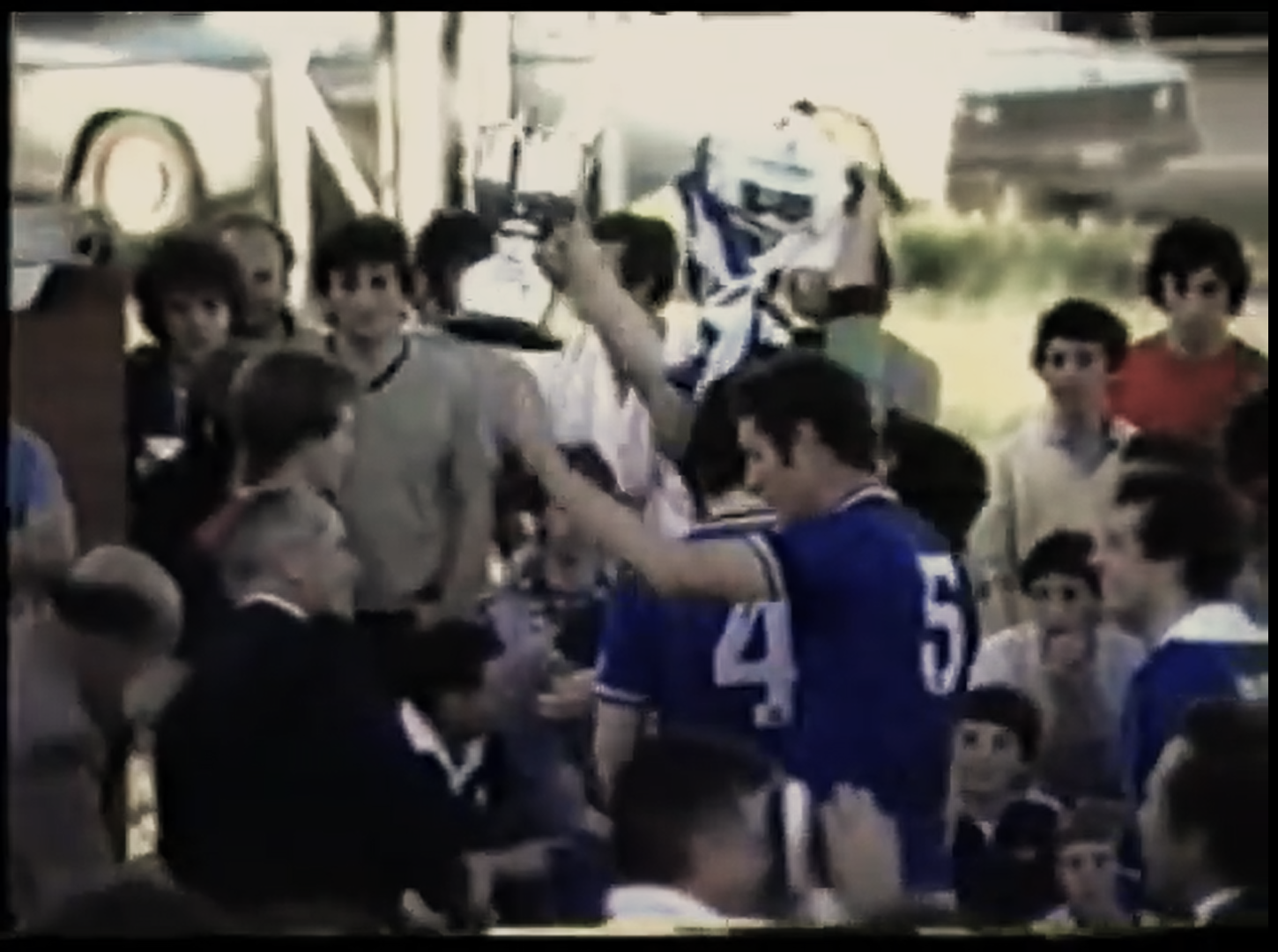
Morwell Falcons with the 1984 Victorian State League Championship and Finals Cup trophies

=== Victorian State League 1982 to 1992 ===
The team fared well in its first season at Tier 2 State League level, finishing a very creditable 4th in the League Championship in 1982. The Falcons went on to finish Runner-Up in the State League Finals Cup in its first season in Tier 2, losing to Green Gully in the Final.

In its 3rd season in 1984 the Falcons won the League Championship and League (Finals) Cup Double, the teams first State League Championship. It was the first time a Latrobe Valley-Gippsland based team had won the State League Championship since Yallourn in 1951. Jim Maclean won the Rothman's Medal for Victorian State League Player of the Year.
See the only goal in the State League (Finals) Cup Final.
See the presentation to Morwell Falcons.

The Falcons were offered the opportunity to apply to join the Tier 1 National Soccer League, but declined the offer. If Morwell Falcons had entered the NSL for the 1984–85 season, it would have been from "Non-League" (now Tier 9) Latrobe Valley Soccer League to Tier 1 National Soccer League via 7 promotions in 12 seasons.

1984 Victorian State League (Tier 2)
Pos	Team	P	W	L	D	GF	GA	GD	Pts	Result
1	Morwell Falcons (C) (F)	26	16	8	2	49	15	34	40	Champions, Finals Cup Winners
3	Maribyrnong	26	15	7	4	64	37	27	37	
3	Fawkner	26	15	6	5	61	35	26	36	
4	Box Hill	26	11	9	6	44	32	12	31	

In 1985 the Falcons achieved a Runners-Up finish in both the League Championship and State League (Finals) Cup, following on from the double the previous season. The Falcons qualified for a 3rd State League (Finals) Cup Final in 4 years in 1985. Morwell repeated the successes of 1984 in 1989, again winning the Championship and League (Finals) Cup double. See an image of the president and manager with the Victorian State League (Finals) Cup Trophy here.

1989 Victorian State League (Tier 2)
Pos	Team	P	W	L	D	GF	GA	GD	Pts	Result
1	Morwell Falcons (C) (F)	30	18	9	3	61	23	38	45	Champions, Finals Cup Winners
3	Brunswick Juventus	30	18	8	4	52	20	32	44	
3	Croydon City	30	18	5	7	47	17	30	41	
4	St Albans	30	15	9	6	41	23	18	39	

In 1991 the Falcons finished the newly renamed Victorian Premier League Season in 3rd. When APIA Leichhardt were relegated back to New South Wales State League at the end of the 1991-92 NSL Season due to financial difficulties, the Falcons were offered promotion to the Tier 1 National Soccer League, and accepted. Morwell Falcons finished 8th in the clubs last season in the Tier 2 Victorian State League Winter season in 1992, and moved directly into the 1992-93 NSL Summer Season.

The promotion to the Tier 1 National Soccer League completed a 20-year rise from the Latrobe Valley Soccer League through Tiers 7 to 2 of the Victorian State League, and final promotion to Tier 1, the NSL. Morwell Falcons were in the Tier 2 Victorian State League top division for 11 seasons.

=== National Soccer League ===
Chart of yearly table positions for Morwell Falcons in NSL

Morwell Falcons were admitted to the then National Soccer League for the 1992–93 season, the 4th NSL season with a Summer schedule. It meant that the Falcons had to complete the 26-game 1992 Victorian State League season, then move into the 26-game Summer NSL Season in the same year, after a break of just over 6 weeks. Morwell Falcons last game in the Victorian Premier League was in Round 26 on Sunday August 23, 1992. The Falcons drew 1–1 with Brunswick Juventus in Morwell.

==== National Soccer League Inaugural Game: Round 1 1992-93 Season ====
NSL Round 1

7 October 1992

Morwell Falcons (Australia)	2-0	(Australia) Sydney Olympic
Zlatko Markovski; Billy Wright	Report

Falcons Park (Latrobe City Stadium), Morwell, Latrobe Valley, Gippsland
Attendance: 3676
Referee: Not Available

The tired looking Falcons finishing 12th in the inaugural season in Tier 1.

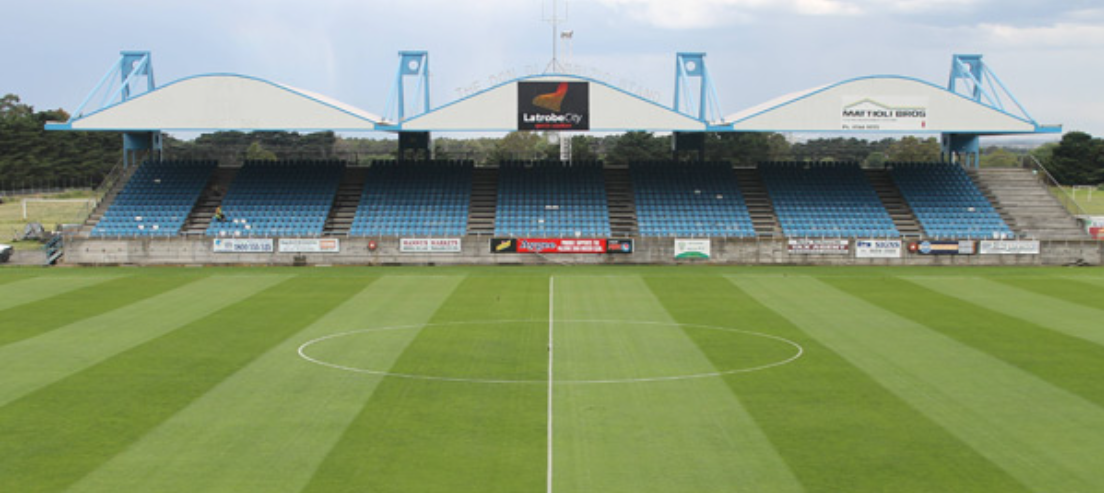
The Di Fabrizio Stand: Opened Round 18 1993-94

What followed was a disappointing listed finish of 7th in 1993–94. Morwell missed out on Final 6 qualification via a series of bizarre refereeing decisions, which resulted in the Falcons finishing 7th and missing the playoffs. The new Di Fabrizio stand on the outer side of Falcons Park was opened before the Round 18 home game against South Melbourne. See a short television news feature on the stand opening here. The game drew a record crowd of well over 4 times the number of seats available at the venue of 8,256. Morwell's season finished with 3 wins in a row, including a 3–2 away win against Marconi Fairfield in Sydney who qualified for the playoffs in 4th, and a 4–3 away win over 1st placed Melbourne Knights at Somers St Stadium, Melbourne. Morwell had the 7th highest average home attendance (of 14 teams) in the league.

Morwell went on to win the statewide Dockerty Cup in 1994 with a win over Melbourne Zebras in the final 2–1. Morwell Falcons became the first Gippsland based team to win the Dockerty Cup since Wonthaggi Magpies in 1931. The Dockerty Cup was open to all teams based in the state of Victoria. As an NSL team the Falcons entered the competition in the Quarter Final stage and had wins over Frankston Pines, South Melbourne, and Melbourne Zebras to win the tournament.

==== 1994 Dockerty Cup ====
Quarter Final

18 September 1994

Morwell Falcons (Australia)	6–1	(Australia) Frankston Pines
Armstrong 3; Markovski 2; Canosa	Report	Watson

Middle Park, Melbourne
Attendance: Not Available
Referee: John Santa Isabel

Semi Final

22 September 1994

Morwell Falcons (Australia)	2–1 (a.e.t.)	(Australia) South Melbourne
Armstrong 35', 109'	Report	Boutsianis 2'

Olympic Park, Melbourne
Attendance: Not Available
Referee: John Fraser.

Final

25 September 1994

Melbourne Zebras (Australia)	1-2	(Australia) Morwell Falcons
Karkaletsis 36' (Penalty)	Report	Bothwell 45'; Waddell 64' (Penalty)

Olympic Park, Melbourne
Referee: John Santa Isabel

Morwell Falcons:
Jason Dastey, Gary Upton, Claudio Canosa, Steve Douglas, Shaun Parton, Marcus Stergiopoulos, Sonny Sevin, John Waddell, Brian Bothwell,
Carlo Villani, Lachlan Armstrong.
Coach: Bobby McLachlan

==== Finals 1994-95 ====
Morwell Falcons played in its only National Soccer League Finals Series in 1995. The team had arguably its best season ever, qualifying 4th in the top 6. The league system involved a penalty shootout at the end of every draw. The Falcons lost just 5 games outright (of 24) for the season, finishing with 8 wins and 11 draws (4 penalty shootout wins and 7 penalty shootout losses). Morwell Falcons hosted leg 1 of the NSL Finals Series Elimination Final versus South Melbourne. A large finals crowd at the Crinigan Road Latrobe City Stadium of 6,565 saw the Falcons play well, but ultimately lose the game 0–1. In the return leg the Falcons lost 5–1 in front of 5,807 in Melbourne at Olympic Park. John Markovski scored the Falcons only goal in an NSL Final in the 66th minute of leg 2. Morwell later won through to the final four of the Dockerty Cup for the second consecutive year, losing to South Melbourne in the Semi Finals.

==== The National Soccer League Top 6 1994-95 ====
Pos	Team	Pld	W	PW	PL	L	GF	GA	GD	Pts	Qualification
1	Melbourne Knights (C)	24	16	2	2	4	56	25	+31	70	
2	Adelaide City	24	16	1	3	4	41	20	+21	69	
3	Sydney United	24	15	3	2	4	34	19	+15	68	
4	Morwell Falcons	24	8	4	7	5	41	37	+4	47	Qualification for the Finals series
5	West Adelaide	24	8	5	3	8	28	32	−4	45	
6	South Melbourne	24	9	3	2	10	42	36	+6	44	

Updated to match(es) played on unknown. Source: rsssf.com
Rules for classification: 1) points; 2) goal difference; 3) number of goals scored.
(C) Champion

==== 1994-95 National Soccer League Elimination Final ====
Leg 1

15 April 1995
19:00 approx

Morwell Falcons (Australia)	0–1	(Australia) South Melbourne Hellas
	Report	Kelic 60'

Latrobe City Stadium (Falcons Park), Morwell, Latrobe Valley, Gippsland
Attendance: 6,565
Referee: Gerry Connolly

Leg 2

23 April 1995
15:00 approx

(Australia) South Melbourne Hellas	5–1	Morwell Falcons (Australia)
Trimboli 12'; Petersen 30'; Muscat 45'; Kelic 59'; Polak 64'	Report	Markovski 66'

Olympic Park, Melbourne
Attendance: 5,807
Referee: Eugene Brazzale

South Melbourne Won 6–1 on aggregate.

=== Relegation and Folded ===
Morwell Falcons finished no higher than 10th in all of the seasons between 1995–96 to 2000–01, not qualifying for the NSL finals series again after 1994–95. The team name changed to Gippsland, then again to "Eastern Pride" for the 2000–01 season. Morwell Falcons final win in the NSL was under the name Eastern Pride in Round 25, 2000–01. A 2–1 win over Parramatta Power on 31/03/2001. The club forfeited its last four matches of the season, all marked as a 0–3 loss. The team was stripped of its 20 competitions points for regulations breaches by league administration. The club was relegated from the NSL after finishing 15th (of 16) in 2000-01 and subsequently folded. The club was re-established in 2001 as Falcons 2000 and rejoined the rated Tier 9 Latrobe Valley Soccer League.

The National Soccer League was replaced with the A-League Men in 2005–06, making the new Tier 1 exclusively for licensed teams only with no promotion and relegation from the State League "pyramids". The new Tier 1 was established before restructuring that included Australia (including the Socceroos) transferring from Oceania Football Confederation to the Asian Football Confederation before qualifying for the 2010 FIFA World Cup began.

Some would argue that the Morwell Falcons - 1971 through to the 1994-5 Dockerty Cup win and Tier 1 National Soccer League Finals Series participation - is Australia's only "football purists" historical example of promotion from "non-league" to Tier 1 in Australia's Association Football history.

Morwell Falcons (Gippsland Falcons, Eastern Pride) NSL Home Record in Morwell 1992 to 2001
Year	P	W	D	(PW)	(PL)	L	GF	GA	ATTENDANCE	AVERAGE
1992-93	13	5	4	-	-	4	21	19	37172	2859
1993-94	13	5	4	-	-	4	12	10	37987	2922
1994-95	13	2	6	(1)	(5)	5	16	16	40075	3083
1995-96	16	6	5	-	-	5	19	22	34088	2131
1996-97	13	4	5	-	-	4	15	13	35953	2766
1997-98	13	4	6	-	-	3	13	12	35416	2724
1998-99	14	4	4	-	-	6	8	17	26938	1924
1999-00	17	4	4	-	-	9	13	18	34347	2147
2000-01	14	4	5	-	-	5	19	20	20802	1734
9 Seasons	126	38	43	(1)	(5)	45	136 (1.1)	147 (1.2)	302,778	2422
%	-	30%	34%	(17%)	(83%)	36%	48%	52%	-	-

== Yearly Results ==
=== Morwell Falcons - Gippsland Falcons - Eastern Pride - 1961 to 2001 ===
Year	Division	Tier	Position
2000–01	National Soccer League	I	15th ↓
1999–00	National Soccer League	I	15th
1998–99	National Soccer League	I	14th
1997–98	National Soccer League	I	11th
1996-97	National Soccer League	I	12th
1995-96	National Soccer League	I	10th
1994-95	National Soccer League	I	4th ↑ 5th
1993-94	National Soccer League	I	7th Dockerty Cup Champions
1992-93	National Soccer League	I	12th
1992	Victorian Premier League	II	8th ↑
1991	Victorian Premier League	II	3rd
1990	Victorian State League	II	6th
1989	Victorian State League	II	Champions; Winners
1988	Victorian State League	II	10th
1987	Victorian State League	II	7th
1986	Victorian State League	II	5th
1985	Victorian State League	II	Runners-Up; Runners-Up
1984	Victorian State League	II	Champions; Winners
1983	Victorian State League	II	10th
1982	Victorian State League	II	4th Runners-Up
1981	Victorian Metropolitan League Division 1	III	9th ↑
1980	Victorian Metropolitan League Division 2	IV	Runners-Up ↑
1979	Victorian Metropolitan League Division 3	V	Runners-Up ↑
1978	Victorian Metropolitan League Division 3	V	3rd
1977	Victorian Metropolitan League Division 4	VI	Runners-Up ↑
1976	Victorian Provisional League	VII``	Runners-Up ↑
1975	Victorian Provisional League	VII``	Champions
1974	Victorian Provisional League	VII``	Champions
1973	Latrobe Valley Soccer League	IX``	Champions ↑
1972	Latrobe Valley Soccer League	IX``	Runners-Up
1971	Latrobe Valley Soccer League	IX``	Champions
1970	Latrobe Valley Soccer League	IX``	~
1969	Latrobe Valley Soccer League	IX``	~
1968	Latrobe Valley Soccer League	IX``	~
1968	Latrobe Valley Soccer League	IX``	~
1967	Latrobe Valley Soccer League	IX``	~
1966	Latrobe Valley Soccer League	IX``	~
1965	Latrobe Valley Soccer League	IX``	~
1964	Latrobe Valley Soccer League	IX``	~
1963	Latrobe Valley Soccer League	IX``	Runners-Up
1962	Latrobe Valley Soccer League	IX``	~
1961	Latrobe Valley Soccer League	IX``	~

``Approximate equivalent tier relevant to the formation of the NSL in 1977 and the current structure.
↑ Promoted: To a Higher Tier or NSL Finals
↓ Relegated from the NSL and Disbanded, Re-Formed as Falcons 2000 in the Latrobe Valley Soccer League (Tier IX)

== History ==
Gippsland Falcons Logo

The club was formed in 1961 by Italian migrants as the Italian Australian Social Club of Gippsland (IASCO), and initially played in the Latrobe Valley Soccer League.

In 1964, the club changed its name to Morwell Falcons as a result of a sponsorship arrangement with the Ford Motor Company. Morwell joined the wider ranks of the Victorian leagues in 1974, and quickly rose up the divisions reaching the Victorian State League in 1982, and winning the title in 1984 under the tutelage of famed Irish coach and ex-Fulham icon Jimmy Dunne.

This allowed them to apply for the NSL's Southern Conference, but the club declined the offer. It was that same year that Jim McLean was the named as the Victorian Premier League Player of the Year (known as the Rothmans Medal at the time).

Despite the triumph in 1984, heartbreak would follow in 1985 as the slow-starting Falcons finished the season with a sensational flourish to win seven of their last eight matches - including a 1–0 victory over eventual league champions Croydon City. Despite the barnstorming run, Croydon - now with Falcons' 1984 league champion Billy Whiteside in goal - held their nerve to claim the league title with a 5–1 away win over Maribyrnong Polonia on the final day of the season.

Dunne left the club in 1986 and the club moved on to Scottish coach Bobby McLachlan, who stayed for eight years.

In 1989, Morwell won its second Victorian championship, pipping Brunswick Juventus to the title by a solitary point. The Falcons were placed in a two leg playoff for a spot in the National Soccer League/ However, the Falcons failed to progress to the top flight after losing 5–2 on aggregate against South Australian champions West Adelaide.

The club eventually joined the NSL's ranks in season 1992/93. Morwell won the statewide Dockerty Cup in 1994, after entering the competition as an NSL team in the Quarter Final Stage. The Falcons qualified for the NSL finals once in season 1994/95 after finishing fourth. The club thereafter always found itself in the bottom half of the table, and late in season 2000/01 the club was relegated and subsequently folded.

While the club officially disbanded in 2001, Falcons 2000 were created as an offshoot club, and currently compete in the Latrobe Valley Soccer League.

== 1984 Victorian State Championship winning season ==

1984 Victorian Champions Starting XI

Despite finishing fourth in their first year in the Victorian State Men's League in 1982, the Falcons slipped to the 10th in 1983 - although expectations for the 1984 season were boosted for Latrobe Valley-based club when they recruited some key players, including Northern Irish youth international Gerry Clark, Irish striker Stephen Moore and dynamic Englishman Russell Athersych.

While Clark went on to become something of an icon in Gippsland football in later life, coaching numerous local clubs, Moore's prowess in front of goal in 1984 - scoring 17 goals in 26 games - proved why he was considered the league's best strikers.

The Falcons won just one of their first five games but a 5-0 thumping of Knox City in round six ignited their season and they then claimed victory in six of their next seven matches to climb to the top of the league.

A series of powerful victories - including a 6–0 thrashing of Knox City and a 4-0 hammering of St Albans - meant the Falcons were in the box seat to claim the highest honour in Victorian football, with the signing of Doveton striker Iain Stirton after round 14 proving to be an inspired choice after he was relegated to the Doveton bench by coach Hammy McMeechan. Stirton had an extraordinary impact, netting 10 goals in his first seven games for Morwell and adding another to finish with 11 for the season.

Leading the league by two points, the Falcons needed only a draw in their final match against Albion Rovers to claim the title. A 0–0 draw at Selwyn Reserve in Albion ensured the Falcons would win their first ever state championship.

The Falcons then went on to win the post-season State League Cup, defeating Fawkner 9–8 on penalties in the semi-final before claiming a 1–0 victory over Maribyrnong Polonia in the final.

== 1989 Victorian State Championship winning season ==

1989 Victorian Champions Starting XI

The Falcons entered the 1989 Victorian State League having finished the 1988 season in 10th position, 11 points behind league champions Heidelberg United - who were subsequently promoted to the National Soccer League.

The second and third placed teams of 1988 - St Albans and Croydon City - were widely expected to contend for the 1989 title but the Falcons shocked the football world to soar back into contention for the league title, largely thanks to the goals of Darko Basara (11 goals) and New Zealand international New Zealand international Billy Wright (eight goals) - with Northern Irish import Ron Manley proving an astute mid-season pick-up, grabbing six goals in 13 games. Popular captain Jim McBride also hit six goals in 28 games and club veteran Sean Byrne - who did not miss a game all season - added five of his own.

After a critical slip up by equal-first placed Brunswick Juventus on the penultimate day of the season, losing 2–1 to Northcote City, the Falcons moved a point clear heading into the final round thanks to a crucial 0–0 draw at home to Frankston Pines.

Holding to their league lead by a point, the Falcons needed only a win against Ringwood City in the final game of the season to ensure they would be crowned champions for the second time.

In one of the Falcons' finest ever displays, Manley began the rout in the 13th minute before Roy Walsh doubled the Falcons' advantage just before half-time. Wright all but sealed the championship with his effort two minutes after the break before captain Jim McBride sent the capacity crowd at North Crinigan Reserve into a frenzy by making it 4–0 in the final minute.

In October, Morwell had a barnstorming Dockerty Cup run, highlighted by a 2–0 victory over NSL club Footscray JUST - who fielded a star-studded team including Socceroos' trio Mehmet Durakovic, Oscar Crino and Joe Palatsides - in the quarter-finals at Heidelberg. However, the Falcons ran out of steam in the semi-finals, losing 5–0 to eventual runner-up Altona Gate.

== Honours ==
- National Soccer League (I)

Elimination Finals: 1994-95
Inaugural Season: 1992-93

- Dockerty Cup (Statewide Cup)

Champions: 1994
Semi Finals: 1989, 1993, 1995

- Victorian State League (II)

Champions: 1984, 1989
Runner's Up: 1985

- Victorian State League (Finals) Cup (II)

Champions: 1984, 1989
Runner's Up: 1982, 1985

- Victorian Metropolitan League Division 2 (IV)

Runner's Up: 1980 - Promoted

- Victorian Metropolitan League Division 3 (V)

Runner's Up: 1979 - Promoted

- Victorian Metropolitan League Division 4 (VI)

Runner's Up: 1977 - Promoted

- Victorian Provisional League (VII)

Champions: 1974, 1975
Runner's Up: 1976 - Promoted

- Latrobe Valley Soccer League (IX)

Champions: 1971, 1973 - Promoted, 2015, 2017, 2018, 2022, 2024
Runner's Up: 1963, 1972, 2014, 2016, 2023

- Latrobe Valley Soccer League Cup ('Battle of Britain Cup')

Winners: 1972, 2009, 2010, 2014, 2015, 2016
Runner's Up: 1962, 1969, 2011, 2012, 2019, 2023

- Victorian State League Reserves

Champions: 1991

- State League Leading Goalscorer

Iain Stirton (19): 1986

- Victorian State League Player of the Year

Jim Maclean: 1984

== Notable former players ==
- (Australia) Adam Griffiths
- (Australia) (New Zealand) Archie Thompson
- (New Zealand) (England) Billy Wright
- (Scotland) (Australia) Brian Bothwell
- (Australia) Ernie Tapai
- (Australia) Eugene Galekovic
- (Australia) Levent Osman
- (Wales) Jeff Hopkins
- (England) Alun Evans
- (Serbia) Aleksandar Đorđević
- (New Zealand) Mark Foy
- (Australia) Eddie Krncevic
- (Malta) (Australia) John Hutchinson
- (Australia) John Markovski
- (Australia) Steve Mautone
- (Australia) (Montenegro) Mehmet Duraković
- (Australia) Naum Sekulovski
- (New Zealand) Sean Douglas
- (New Zealand) (Republic of Ireland) Sean Byrne
- (Australia) Scott McDonald
- (Australia) Scott Miller
- (Australia) Warren Spink
- (Australia) Bobby Despotovski
- (Australia) Marcus Stergiopoulos
- (Lebanon) (Australia) Michael Reda
- (Australia) (Scotland) Jimmy Mackay
- (Scotland) Sandy Robertson
