= Robbie Hooker =

Australian soccer player and coach

Robert Hooker
Personal information
- Date of birth: 6 March 1967 (age 59)
- Place of birth: Australia
- Position: Defender

Youth career
- 1984–1985: Australian Institute of Sport

Senior career*
Years	Team	Apps	(Gls)
1986	Sydney City	15	(0)
1987–1992	Sydney Olympic	113	(2)
1992–1997	West Adelaide	131	(17)
1997–1998	Sydney United	23	(1)
1998–1999	Marconi Stallions	12	(1)
1999–2001	Canberra Cosmos	57	(0)
2001–2002	Auckland Kingz	10	(0)
2003–2004	APIA Leichhardt Tigers	14	(0)

International career
1984	Australia U-20		
1985	Australia U-23		
1990–1998	Australia	22	(2)

Managerial career
- 2008–2009: Canberra United
- 2023–2025: Western Sydney Wanderers Women
Medal record
Representing Australia
Men's Association football
FIFA Confederations Cup
Runner-up	1997 Saudi Arabia
OFC Nations Cup
Winner	1996 Oceania
- * Club domestic league appearances and goals

Robert Hooker (born 6 March 1967) is an Australian former soccer player and coach. He played for and later became assistant coach of the Australian national team and is the current head coach of the Western Sydney Wanderers Women.

== Playing career ==
Hooker started his playing career with Mount Colah Soccer Club and was a graduate of the Australian Institute of Sport Football Program, granted a scholarship in 1984 and 1985. This led to selection in the Australia U20 side for the 1985 FIFA World Youth Championship finals.

Through his playing career, Hooker played in the NSL for Sydney City, Sydney Olympic, West Adelaide, Sydney United, Marconi, Canberra Cosmos and Auckland Kingz. He later finished his career in the NSW Premier League with APIA Leichhardt and Belconnen Blue Devils.

He was first selected for the Socceroos in 1990, coming on as a substitute against touring club side Hajduk Split. He would make his first appearance in an 'A' international later that year away to South Korea. From 1995 to 1998 he was a regular selection in the national team, including inclusion in the 1997 FIFA Confederations Cup squad.

== Coaching career ==
After his playing career, he took up coaching in women's football, first in the United States with the Women's National League before returning to Australia where he was head coach of the ACTAS Women's Football Program and assistant coach for the Matildas. Ahead of the 2008–09 W-League season, Hooker joined W-League club, Canberra United as its inaugural coach. He only stayed on as manager of United for one season. In 2010, following the appointment of Holger Osieck as Socceroos head coach, Hooker and Aurelio Vidmar were employed as assistants. After over a decade out of top level coaching, he returned to join Western Sydney Wanderers when Kat Smith left the club 2 weeks prior to the start of the 2023–24 A-League Women season. In January 2025, Hooker and the club mutually terminated his contract due to personal reasons.

== Career statistics ==
International goals
No.	Date	Venue	Opponent	Score	Result	Competition
1	1 November 1995	Bruce Stadium, Canberra, Australia	Tahiti	1–0	5–0	1996 OFC Nations Cup
2	25 January 1997	Sydney Football Stadium, Sydney, Australia	Norway	1–0	1–0	Friendly

== Honours ==
Australia

- FIFA Confederations Cup: runner-up, 1997
- OFC Nations Cup: 1996
