= John Markovski =

Australian soccer player and coach

Personal information
- Full name: John Markovski
- Date of birth: 15 April 1970 (age 56)
- Place of birth: Sunshine, Victoria, Australia
- Position: Striker

Senior career*
Years	Team	Apps	(Gls)
1986–1988	Sunshine George Cross	68	(20)
1989	Preston Lions	25	(7)
1989–1990	Melbourne Croatia	23	
1990–1992	Marconi Stallions	49	(16)
1992–1993	Preston Lions	23	(8)
1993–1995	Morwell Falcons	48	(20)
1994	→ Altona Magic (loan)	15	(7)
1995	Altona Magic	9	(2)
1995–1997	Melbourne Knights	23	(3)
1996–1997	Canberra Cosmos	7	(2)
1997–1998	Carlton S.C.	25	(12)
1998–1999	Perth Glory	22	(11)
1999–2001	Carlton Blues	36	(6)
2001–2002	Football Kingz	23	(1)
2002	Preston Lions		(0)
2003–2004	Western Suburbs SC		(2)
2004–2006	Fawkner Blues	19	(2)
2007	Sunshine George Cross FC	9	(0)
2008	Sydenham Park		(3)

International career^{‡}
1994–1998	Australia	19	(1)

Managerial career
- 2001: Altona Magic
- 2002–2003: Preston Lions
- 2004–2006: Fawkner Blues
- 2007: Sunshine George Cross
- 2008: Preston Lions
- 2012: Altona Magic
- 2017–2018: Sydenham Park
- 2020: Springvale White Eagles
- 2021: Altona Magic
- 2021: Fitzroy City
- 2023: Altona Magic
- 2025: Port Melbourne
- 2025: Melbourne Knights
Medal record
Representing Australia
Men's Association football
OFC Nations Cup
Winner	1996 Oceania
- * Club domestic league appearances and goals as of 15 July 2007 ‡ National team caps and goals as of 15 July 2007

John Markovski (born 15 April 1970) is an Australian soccer coach and former player. Markovski played in the National Soccer League (NSL) for Sunshine George Cross, Preston Lions (former Preston Makedonia), Morwell Falcons, Canberra Cosmos, Auckland Kingz, Carlton SC, Melbourne Knights and Perth Glory FC and was known Australia-wide for his excellent free kick taking skills. Markovski was head coach for Melbourne Knights, Altona Magic, Preston Lions, Fawkner Blues, Sunshine George Cross, Springvale White Eagles, Sydenham Park, Fitzroy City and Port Melbourne.

== Personal life ==
Markovski has three children named Joshua, Jonas and Zara. He now watches and coaches them proudly play the sport he once used to. His son Jonas Markovski currently plays for Preston Lions FC

== Playing career ==
=== Club career ===
Markovski made his debut as a second-half substitute for Sunshine George Cross in round one of the 1986 National Soccer League season at the age of 15.

Ahead of the 1989 National Soccer League season, Markovski signed for Preston Makedonia.

=== International career ===
Markovski represented the Australia national soccer team on 19 occasions for one goal and represented Australia at under 20 and 23 level at the Barcelona Olympics in 1992 and at the World Youth Cup in 1987.

== Coaching career ==
Markovski began his coaching career while still playing, taking charge of Preston Lions midway through the 2002 Victorian Premier League season. Markovski was coach at Sydenham Park SC in Victorian State League 1 in 2017 and 2018. Also became the head coach at Springvale White Eagles in 2020 and head coach for Altona Magic in 2012, 2021 and 2023.

== Career statistics ==
=== Club ===
Appearances and goals by club, season and competition
Club	Season	Division	App	Goals
Sunshine George Cross	1986	National Soccer League	24	5
Sunshine George Cross	1987	National Soccer League	22	8
Sunshine George Cross	1988	National Soccer League	24	7
Total			70	20
Preston Makedonia	1989	National Soccer League	25	8
Total			25	8
Melbourne Croatia	1989–90	National Soccer League	21	5
Total			21	5
Marconi	1990–91	National Soccer League	28	10
Marconi	1991–92	National Soccer League	19	6
Total			47	16
Preston Makedonia	1992–93	National Soccer League	23	8
Total			23	8
Morwell Falcons	1993–94	National Soccer League	24	11
Morwell Falcons	1994–95	National Soccer League	24	9
Total			48	20
Melbourne Knights	1995–96	National Soccer League	16	3
Total			16	3
Canberra Cosmos	1996–97	National Soccer League	7	2
Total			7	2
Melbourne Knights	1996–97	National Soccer League	9	0
Total			9	0
Carlton	1997–98	National Soccer League	25	12
Total			25	12
Perth Glory	1998–99	National Soccer League	22	11
Total			22	11
Carlton	1999–2000	National Soccer League	30	5
Carlton	2000–01	National Soccer League	6	1
Total			36	6
Football Kingz	2001–02	National Soccer League	23	1
Total			23	1
Career total			372	112

Ref.

=== International ===
International goals
No.	Date	Venue	Opponent	Score	Result	Competition
1	15 February 1995	Sydney Football Stadium (1988), Sydney, Australia	Japan	1–0	2–1	Friendly

== Honours ==
Australia

- OFC Nations Cup: 1996
