= Peter Buljan =

Australian footballer (born 1978)

Personal information
- Full name: Peter Buljan
- Date of birth: 14 July 1978 (age 48)
- Place of birth: Canberra, Australia
- Height: 1.85 m (6 ft 1 in)
- Position: Striker

Youth career
- 1985–1993: Canberra Croatia
- 1994–1996: AIS

Senior career*
Years	Team	Apps	(Gls)
1996–1999	Canberra Cosmos	66	(21)
1999–2001	Perth Glory	21	(1)
2001	Brisbane Strikers	13	(4)
2001–2003	South Melbourne	43	(8)
2003	Melbourne Knights	8	(0)
2003–2005	1. FC Saarbrücken	11	(0)
2006	SV Eintracht Trier 05	7	(0)

International career^{‡}
- Australia U19
- Australia U23
- * Club domestic league appearances and goals as of 2 May 2009 ‡ National team caps and goals as of 3 October 2006

Peter Buljan (born 14 July 1978 in Canberra, Australia) is an Australian football player.
