= Norman Kelly (footballer) =

Northern Irish footballer (born 1970)

Personal information
- Full name: Norman Kelly
- Date of birth: 10 October 1970 (age 56)
- Place of birth: Belfast, Northern Ireland
- Position: Midfielder

Senior career*
Years	Team	Apps	(Gls)
1989–1991	Oldham Athletic	2	(0)
1989	→ Wigan Athletic (loan)	4	(0)
1991–1993	Dunfermline Athletic	14	(0)
1993	Brunei		
1993–1995	Raith Rovers	4	(0)
1993	→ Glenavon (loan)	4	(2)
1994	→ Glentoran (loan)	5	(2)
1995	IFK Stromstad		
1995	Brunei		
1995–1999	Canberra Cosmos	78	(9)
1999–2002	Linfield	63	(4)
2002	Glenavon	10	(0)
2003	Crusaders	13	(0)

International career
- Northern Ireland under-18 Northern Ireland under-19 Northern Ireland under-21 Northern Ireland B
- * Club domestic league appearances and goals

Norman Kelly (born 10 October 1970) is a Northern Irish former footballer who played for a number of clubs throughout his career.

== Career ==
Kelly began his career with Oldham Athletic and spent time on loan with Wigan Athletic before spells in Scotland with Fife sides Dunfermline Athletic and Raith Rovers, in between moving to Southeast Asia to play for the Brunei representative side in the Malaysian league in 1993 at the invitation of his former Oldham boss Mick Lyons. Kelly then had loan spells in his native Northern Ireland before moving to Sweden with IFK Strömstad, and afterwards returned to Brunei for a second time.

Kelly would move on to spending five years in Australia with Canberra Cosmos. When that ended in 1999, Kelly moved to Linfield, where he picked up two league titles and a cup in his three years there. Kelly moved to Glenavon in the summer of 2002 but was released just a few months later. Kelly moved to the United States in 2003 after his short spell with Crusaders where he coached junior football.

Kelly won caps for Northern Ireland between under-18 and B team level.

== Honours ==
Linfield

- Irish Premier League: 1999–00, 2000–01
- Irish Cup: 2001–02
