= Canberra Cosmos FC =

Australian association football club based in Canberra

Canberra Cosmos
- Full name: Canberra Cosmos Football Club
- Nickname: Cosmos
- Short name: CCFC, CFC
- Founded: 1995
- Dissolved: 2001
- Ground: Canberra Stadium, Bruce, Canberra, ACT
- Capacity: 25,011
Home colours	Away colours

Canberra Cosmos Football Club was an Australian soccer club based in Canberra, Australian Capital Territory. It participated in the National Soccer League from the 1995/96 season until the end of the 2000/01 season, after which it folded, primarily due to financial difficulties. Throughout their tenure in the NSL, the club failed to attract supporters and had limited on-field success.

== History ==
Chart of yearly table positions for Canberra Cosmos in NSL

=== A new club ===
The Cosmos were founded in 1995 as a new franchise for entry into the 1995/96 NSL season. The club arose as a ‘community model’ consortium with shares held by ACT Soccer Federation and a number of local clubs, with some support from the ACT Government.

Canberra finished respectably in their first season for a new club. In finishing ninth, they performed better than much more experienced teams Wollongong, Newcastle Breakers and Gippsland Falcons. Much of the credit could be given to experienced Socceroo captain Paul Wade. But 1995–96 also saw the revelation of talented Canberra-based youngsters Michael Musitano and Alex Castro, who were accordingly snapped up by other clubs in the 1996 off-season.

=== Wooden Spoons ===
Canberra's second season was much more forgettable however. In finishing last, the club ended the season 16 points behind second-last placed team. Despite a dreary end to the season, a positive action would revive the club in 1997 as computing company Novell came on board with a stunningly large sponsorship deal. This allowed the Cosmos to recruit the 1996–97 coach of the year Branko Culina and after losing their best players the previous year, Canberra was a net importer of quality players for this season. New signings included Scottish defender Gordon Hunter from Hibernian, Sydney United midfielder Ante Moric and the return of Michael Musitano. Unfortunately, this did not translate into on-field performance, winning only once in the first thirteen games – a run including an 8–0 loss to Wollongong – and only three times in the season (including a record 8–1 win over UTS). The Cosmos finished the 1997–98 season bottom of the table again which saw the departure of Culina and appointment of former Socceroos coach Rale Rasic.

New signings for 1998–99 including Melbourne Knights goalkeeper Vilson Knezevic and Gippsland Falcons defender Doug Marcina brought hope, but a winless start to the season for Rasic's young side escalated tensions with the board and Rale departed seven weeks into the new season. The Cosmos continued to struggle in the national competition, finishing last for the third year in a row, ten points behind the second-last team.

The 1999–2000 season saw some on-field improvement by the club achieving nine wins and nine draws. However, the Cosmos remained unstable financially, and administrators were appointed on 30 June 2000 to oversee the club's financial position.

In a time of general turmoil for the NSL, the 2000–01 season was reasonably successful for Canberra, finishing a respectable 11th place and remaining competitive throughout the year with eleven wins and four draws.

=== Exclusion ===
Soccer Australia determined in mid-2000 that it would review the NSL for the 2001–02 season, proposing to reduce the number of teams from 16 to 12. Carlton and Eastern Pride folded during the season, and Soccer Australia determined in June 2001 that Canberra Cosmos was not a 'going concern', excluding them from the league along with Brisbane Strikers.

Appeals by and on behalf of the ejected clubs followed seeking a reversal of the decision, criticising the process and criteria used. Eventually the Soccer Australia board, under pressure from stakeholders and political figures agreed to “re-admit” Canberra and Brisbane to the NSL for the 2001/2002 season.

The Cosmos stepped up planning for the new season, appointing new coaching staff and even forming a partnership with English Second Division club Swindon Town. Despite looking forward, the Cosmos’ financial problems remained and were unable to recover from the initial exclusion decision. After being unable to pay their NSL affiliation fee, Soccer Australia determined that Cosmos FC had not met the required conditions of entry and on 26 September 2001 terminated its right to participate in the 2001/2002 NSL season.

=== Statistics ===
Season	Pld	W	D	L	GF	GA	Pts	Table Position	Average attendance	Cup
1995/96	33	8	11	14	48	61	35	9th of 12	2934	Semi-final
1996/97	26	2	5	19	30	69	11	14th of 14	3176	First Round
1997/98	26	3	8	15	29	56	17	14th of 14	2719	Not held
1998/99	28	4	3	21	21	55	15	15th of 15	2337	Not held
1999/00	34	9	9	16	44	64	36	14th of 16	2428	Not held
2000/01	29	11	4	15	49	55	37	11th of 16	2184	Not held

(Pld)=Games Played, (W) = Wins, (D)=Draws, (L)=Losses, (GF)=Goals For, (GA)=Goals Against, (Pts)=Points, (Cup)= NSL Cup placing

== Youth system ==
The club had only a single 'first team' during its existence with no incorporated reserves or youth development system, owing in part to the structure of the NSL. Local players were drawn from the ACT leagues and formed a major component of the squads.

While the National Youth League was in operation the ACT Academy of Sport provided the Cosmos youth side through the involvement of Soccer Canberra. The Canberran location provided a potential pathway for players from the AIS Football Squad, although no formal links were ever established. The program, aimed at developing players aged 16–17, also competed in the NYL independently. Few players graduated successfully from the ACTAS and AIS programs to the Cosmos squad.

== Colours and badge ==
The original Canberra Cosmos logo for the 1995/96 season.

In their inaugural season, the Cosmos played in predominantly dark blue shirts and dark blue shorts, colours reflecting the original ‘shooting star’ logo, provided through sportswear manufacturer Asics. The alternate strip was a white shirt and shorts, also with large stars in the trim. A yellow alternate strip with black shorts was later introduced. For the 97/98 season, the away colours of a white shirt with blue trim became the home colours, giving more prominence to the sponsor. For the 1998/99 season, the club emblem was revised to a circle and star design. The home strip colours were changed to red shirt and shorts with a new change strip of yellow shirt and shorts, now manufactured under a new clothing deal with Admiral Sportswear. The logo featured a blue star over a gold circle, which was later revised to a black star over a red circle to closer reflect the new red home strip. For the 2000/01 season which was to be their last due to the Soccer Australia management turmoil had unveiled a new logo for the 2001/02 season. While there was no further information on possible change in shirt colours the new logo featured black, orange and white.

== Stadium ==
The Cosmos home ground was Canberra Stadium. During major renovations to the stadium in 1997, home games were played at Seiffert Oval in Queanbeyan. A small number of games were also played on AIS grounds.

== Supporters ==
The Cosmos failed to attract significant support within the Canberra community which was reflected in poor attendances at games.

A small but loyal group of fans formed Cosmos FC Supporters Group and were particularly active in promoting the game to the Canberra community. The group were consistently in attendance at home games and often travelled to away fixtures, particularly matches against the seven clubs located in New South Wales.

The official Canberra Cosmos mascot known as ‘Cosmo’ appeared at most home games throughout the club's tenure. Adorned in a blue white and silver helmet and jumpsuit, Cosmo would ride a unicycle, juggle and entertain the crowd from the sideline and during pre-game and halftime, notably being sent to the stands by the referee during one game for allegedly inciting the crowd to violence.

== Notable former players ==
Below is a list of players who have represented Canberra Cosmos in the NSL and who have at least one senior or junior international cap for a FIFA sanctioned national team.

Canberra Cosmos Notable Former Players
Name	National Team	Caps(Goals)
(Australia) Peter Buljan	Australia men's national under-23 soccer team	UKN
(Australia) Vince Grella	Australia men's national soccer team	46(0)
(Australia) Robbie Hooker	Australia men's national soccer team	22(2)
(Northern Ireland) Norman Kelly	Northern Ireland national football B team	UKN
(Australia) John Markovski	Australia men's national soccer team	19(1)
(Australia) Danny Milosevic	Australia men's national under-23 soccer team	UKN
(Australia) Nik Mrdja	Australia men's national soccer team	1(0)
(Australia) Jason Polak	Australia men's national soccer team	32(2)
(Australia) Paul Wade	Australia men's national soccer team	84(10)
(Australia) Lindsay Wilson	Australia national soccer team	2(0)

== Managers ==
- (England) Mick Lyons (Jun 1995 – May 1997)
- (Australia) Branko Čulina (Jun 1997 – Mar 1998)
- (Australia) Rale Rasic (Mar – Nov 1998)
- (Australia) Tony Brennan (caretaker) (Nov 1998 – Jan 1999)
- (Scotland) Tom Sermanni (Jan 1999 – Mar 2001)
- (Australia) Milan Milovanovic (Mar – Jul 2001)
- (Uruguay) Antonio Alzamendi (Jul 2001 (appointed then terminated shortly after))
- (Australia) Leon (Bill) Gardikiotis (Aug – Sep 2001)

== Records ==
- Biggest win: 8–1 v UTS Olympic, 5 January 1998, Seiffert Oval
- Biggest loss: 0–8 v Wollongong City, 5 December 1997, Brandon Park, Wollongong
- Highest scoring match: 5–5 v Newcastle Breakers, 16 February 1996, Breakers Stadium, Newcastle
- Most Capped Player: Toplica Popovich (124 games)
- All-time top scorer: Peter Buljan (21 goals)
- Highest attendance: 9,421 – 1 November 1996 (1–1 v Newcastle Breakers)
