= List of Cumberland County Cricket Club List A players =

Cumberland County Cricket Club played 23 List A cricket matches between 1984 and 2003. The following players appeared for them during those matches.

== List of players ==
- James Anyon, 1 match, 2003
- Asim Munir, 1 match, 2002
- Ian Austin, 1 match, 2002
- Eldine Baptiste, 1 match, 1994
- David Barnes (cricketer), 1 match, 2003
- Paul Beech, 4 matches, 1996–1999
- Paul Berry, 1 match, 1995
- Neil Boustead, 3 matches, 1984–1986
- James Bruce, 1 match, 2001
- Mark Burns, 2 matches, 2002
- Grahame Clarke, 7 matches, 1985–1997
- Charles Dagnall, 1 match, 1998
- David Drury, 1 match, 1985
- Simon Dutton, 15 matches, 1987–2001
- John Elleray, 2 matches, 1985–1986
- Richard Ellwood, 4 matches, 1989–1995
- Robert Entwistle, 1 match, 1984
- Jonathan Fielding, 11 matches, 1996–2001
- Dexter Fitton, 1 match, 1994
- John Glendenen, 5 matches, 1999–2000
- David Halliwell, 6 matches, 1984–1989
- Kevin Hayes, 2 matches, 1988–1989
- Dean Hodgson, 2 matches, 1986–1987
- Stuart Horne, 1 match, 2001
- Quentin Hughes, 1 match, 2003
- Terry Hunte, 4 matches, 1992–2001
- Michael Ingham, 1 match, 1996
- Christopher Kippax, 1 match, 2002
- Simon Kippax, 5 matches, 1995–2000
- Colin Knight, 1 match, 1992
- Steven Knox, 13 matches, 1996–2002
- Pallav Kumar, 1 match, 2003
- Peter Lawson, 3 matches, 2001–2002
- Martin Lewis, 9 matches, 1999–2002
- David Lloyd, 2 matches, 1984–1985
- Graham Lloyd, 1 match, 2003
- David Lupton, 1 match, 1984
- David Makinson, 3 matches, 1992–1995
- John Mason, 2 matches, 2001–2002
- Robert Mason, 2 matches, 2002–2003
- Andrew Mawson, 3 matches, 1996–1998
- Ashley Metcalfe, 10 matches, 1998–2003
- Graham Monkhouse, 1 match, 1987
- James Moyes, 1 match, 2001
- John Moyes, 6 matches, 1984–1989
- Steve O'Shaughnessy, 12 matches, 1994–2003
- David Parsons, 1 match, 1984
- Dipak Patel, 1 match, 1995
- David Pearson, 10 matches, 1994–2000
- David Pennett, 11 matches, 1997–2002
- Simon Philbrook, 1 match, 1986
- Thomas Prime, 2 matches, 2001
- Qasim Umar, 2 matches, 1984–1985
- Bernard Reidy, 6 matches, 1984–1989
- David Rooney, 1 match, 2003
- Kevin Sample, 3 matches, 1985–1992
- Michael Scothern, 6 matches, 1988–1997
- Marcus Sharp, 16 matches, 1994–2003
- Steven Sharp, 6 matches, 1986–1994
- David Smith, 1 match, 1994
- Robert Smith, 1 match, 2001
- Christopher Stockdale, 5 matches, 1986–1992
- Simon Twigg, 2 matches, 2002
- Stephen Wall, 3 matches, 1987–1989
- David Wheatman, 4 matches, 2000–2001
- Gareth White, 1 match, 2002
- A.S. Williams, 1 match, 2001
- Dean Williams, 2 matches, 2001–2003
- Alan Wilson, 1 match, 1984
- Andrew Wilson, 1 match, 1996
- Malcolm Woods, 7 matches, 1984–1992
