= 2004 Cheltenham & Gloucester Trophy =

England tournament

- Administrator: England and Wales Cricket Board
- Cricket format: Limited overs cricket (50 overs)
- Tournament format: knockout
- Champions: Gloucestershire Gladiators (5th title)
- Participants: 42
- Matches: 41
- Most runs: Craig Spearman 364 (for Gloucestershire Gladiators)
- Most wickets: Dougie Brown 13 (for Warwickshire Bears)
- Official website: Cricinfo tournament page

The 2004 Cheltenham & Gloucester Trophy was an English county cricket tournament, held between 28 August 2003 and 28 August 2004. The competition was won by Gloucestershire Gladiators who beat the Worcestershire Royals by 8 wickets at Lord's. This was the final year where only red balls and white clothing was used in the competition.

== Format ==
The eighteen first-class counties, joined by 20 Minor Counties: Bedfordshire, Berkshire, Buckinghamshire, Cambridgeshire, Cheshire, Cornwall, Cumberland, Devon, Dorset, Herefordshire, Hertfordshire, Lincolnshire, Norfolk, Northumberland, Oxfordshire, Shropshire, Staffordshire, Suffolk, Wales Minor Counties, and Wiltshire. They were also joined by the national teams of Denmark, Ireland, the Netherlands, and Scotland. Teams who won in the first round progressed to the second round. The 18 first class counties plus Berkshire, Cambridgeshire, Staffordshire, and Wiltshire joined in the second round. The winners in the second round then progressed third round. The winners in the third round progressed to the quarter-final stage. Winners from the quarter-finals then progressed to the semi-finals from which the winners then went on to the final at Lord's which was held on 28 August 2004.

== Fixtures ==
=== First round ===
28 August 2003
Scorecard

Netherlands; 237/5 (50.0 overs)	v	Cornwall; 225 (49.3 overs)
Chris Smith 48; Tom Sharp 2/33 (10 overs)		Steven Pope 74; Feiko Kloppenburg 3/34 (8.3 overs)

Netherlands won by 12 runs
VRA Cricket Ground, Amstelveen
Umpires: William Smith and Robert Sutton
Player of the match: Steven Pope (Cornwall)

28 August 2003
Scorecard

Cheshire; 241/8 (50 overs)	v	Bedfordshire; 202 (47.3 overs)
Nafees Din 75; Andrew Roberts 4/38 (10 overs)		Andrew Patterson 38; Jason Whittaker 3/29 (9 overs)

Cheshire won by 39 runs
Wardown Park, Luton
Umpires: Johan Luther and John Reed
Player of the match: Simon Twigg

28 August 2003
Scorecard

Devon; 333/6 (50.0 overs)	v	Suffolk; 245/9 (50.0 overs)
David Lye 121; Pierre Joubert 4/82 (10 overs)		Pierre Joubert 46; Andrew Procter 3/36 (10 overs)

Devon won by 88 runs
The Maer Ground, Exmouth
Umpires: Stephen Bishopp and Peter Kingston-Davey
Player of the match: David Lye

28–29 August 2003
Scorecard

Buckinghamshire; 272/6 (48 overs)	v	Dorset
Russell Lane 95; Joseph Wilson 2/40 (10 overs)

No result
Dean Park Cricket Ground, Bournemouth
Umpires: Stephen Kuhlmann and Guy Randall-Johnson
Player of the match: Russell Lane

- No play on the reserve day, Dorset won bowl out 4–1

28–29 August 2003
Scorecard

Ireland; 387/4 (50 overs)	v	Hertfordshire; 312 (43.2 overs)
Andre Botha 139; Nick Walker 3/49 (8 overs)		Gary Butcher 126; Andre Botha 4/37 (7 overs)

Ireland won by 85 runs
Cricket Field Lane, Bishop's Stortford
Umpires: Willem Molenaar and John Tythcott
Player of the match: Andre Botha

- Reserve day used

28 August 2003
Scorecard

Lincolnshire; 228/9 (50 overs)	v	Norfolk; 176 (44 overs)
Mark Higgs 50; Paul Bradshaw 3/37 (10 overs)		Steve Goldsmith 47; Mathew Dowman 4/30 (8 overs)

Lincolnshire won by 52 runs
Manor Park Cricket Ground, Horsford
Umpires: Keith Coburn and John Ilott
Player of the match: Mark Higgs

28–29 August 2003
Scorecard

Northumberland; 139 (39 overs)	v	Shropshire; 131/1 (20.1 overs)
Shahid Nazir 22*; Tim Mason 3/17 (7 overs)		Stephen Adshead 77*; Lee Crozier 1/34 (6 overs)

Shropshire won on faster scoring rate (revised target)
Morda Road, Oswestry
Umpires: Ronnie O'Reilly and Kenneth Shenton
Player of the match: Steve Adshead

- Reserve day used

28 August 2003
Scorecard

Denmark; 189/8 (50 overs)	v	Wales Minor Counties; 190/3 (48.2 overs)
Baljit Singh 58; Tony Smith 2/20 (10 overs)		Andrew Jones 93; Ben Edmondson 2/33 (9.2 overs)

Wales Minor Counties won by 7 wickets
Pen-y-Pound, Abergavenny
Umpires: Michael Moran and Bill Smith
Player of the match: Andrew Jones

31 August 2003
Scorecard

Herefordshire; 267/9 (50 overs)	v	Oxfordshire; 141 (31.4 overs)
Matthew Rawnsley 61 (73); Richard Kaufman 2/48 (10 overs)		Adam Cook 66 (84); Franklyn Rose 5/19 (7 overs)

Herefordshire won by 126 runs
Banbury Cricket Club Ground, Banbury
Umpires: David Burden and Charles Puckett
Player of the match: Franklyn Rose

31 August 2003
Scorecard

Cumberland; 237/9 (50 overs)	v	Scotland; 239/6 (46.4 overs)
Graham Lloyd 123 (133); Greig Williamson 3/38 (6 overs)		Greig Williamson 77 (98); Pallav Kumar 2/33 (10 overs)

Scotland won by 4 wickets
Raeburn Place, Edinburgh
Umpires: Peter Brown and Colin Megennis
Player of the match: Greig Williamson

=== Second round ===
5 May 2004
Scorecard

Gloucestershire Gladiators; 264/6 (50 overs)	v	Netherlands; 192 (47.2 overs)
Phil Weston 106 (127); Luuk van Troost 2/38 (6 overs)		Matthew Mott 41 (55); Mark Alleyne 4/33 (9 overs)

Gloucestershire won by 72 runs
VRA Cricket Ground, Amstelveen
Umpires: Ian Gould and John Steele
Player of the match: Phil Weston

5 May 2004
Scorecard

Hampshire Hawks; 273/8 (50 overs)	v	Cheshire; 184 (47.5 overs)
William Kendall 53 (75); Jason Whittaker 4/45 (10 overs)		Stephen Ogilby 36 (62); Lawrence Prittipaul 3/11 (4 overs)

Hampshire won by 89 runs
Moss Lane, Alderley Edge
Umpires: Mark Benson and Mervyn Kitchen
Player of the match: Jason Whittaker

5 May 2004
Scorecard

Somerset Sabres; 290/6 (50 overs)	v	Derbyshire Phantoms; 276 (48.5 overs)
Jamie Cox 131 (124); Graeme Welch 3/38 (10 overs)		Chris Rogers 93 (104); Simon Francis 8/66 (9.5 overs)

Somerset won by 14 runs
County Ground, Derby
Umpires: John Holder and Barrie Leadbeater
Player of the match: Jamie Cox

5–6 May 2004
Scorecard

Dorset; 97 (38.2 overs)	v	Yorkshire Phoenix; 101/2 (16.5 overs)
Chris Park 23 (51); Chris Silverwood 4/18 (10 overs)		Matthew Wood 71* (58); Damian Worrad 2/31 (8 overs)

Yorkshire won by 8 wickets
Dean Park Cricket Ground, Bournemouth
Umpires: Jeff Evans and Allan Jones
Player of the match: Chris Silverwood

- Reserve day used

5–6 May 2004
Scorecard

Berkshire; 143 (44.4 overs)	v	Kent Spitfires; 144/1 (16.3 overs)
Julian Wood 49 (71); Martin Saggers 4/6 (7.4 overs)		Rob Key 61 (44); Stephen Bloyce 1/66 (6 overs)

Kent won by 9 wickets
St Lawrence Ground, Canterbury
Umpires: Neil Bainton and David Constant
Player of the match: Martin Saggers

- Reserve day used

5 May 2004
Scorecard

Glamorgan Dragons; 340/4 (50 overs)	v	Lincolnshire; 230/6 (50 overs)
Robert Croft 143 (148); Mathew Dowman 2/58 (10 overs)		Guy Welton 60 (107); Robert Croft 2/40 (10 overs)

Glamorgan won by 110 runs
Lindum Sports Club Ground, Lincoln
Umpires: Keith Coburn and Neil Mallender
Player of the match: Robert Croft

5–6 May 2004
Scorecard

Northamptonshire Steelbacks; 273 (49.1 overs)	v	Cambridgeshire; 110 (40.1 overs)
Martin van Jaarsveld 85 (98); Pieter Swanepoel 3/42 (10 overs)		Ian Flanagan 38 (83); Jason Brown 5/19 (10 overs)

Northamptonshire won by 163 runs
County Ground, Northampton
Umpires: Trevor Jesty and Dean Johnson
Player of the match: Jason Brown

- Reserve day used

5 May 2004
Scorecard

Essex Eagles; 273/3 (50 overs)	v	Scotland; 227 (48 overs)
Will Jefferson 97 (106); Yasir Arafat 1/42 (10 overs)		Ryan Watson 76 (110); Danish Kaneria 3/30 (10 overs)

Essex won by 46 runs
Raeburn Place, Edinburgh
Umpires: Tony Clarkson and Nigel Cowley
Player of the match: Will Jefferson

5 May 2004
Scorecard

Lancashire Lightning; 232 (47 overs)	v	Staffordshire; 212/8 (50 overs)
Mark Chilton 42 (54); Imran Tahir 3/31 (9 overs)		Imran Tahir 41 (18); Peter Martins 2/12 (8 overs)

Lancashire won by 20 runs
Lichfield Road, Stone
Umpires: Pasty Harris and Richard Kettleborough
Player of the match: Imran Tahir (Staffs)

5–6 May 2004
Scorecard

Middlesex Crusaders; 277/6 (50.0 overs)	v	Wales Minor Counties; 103 (41.1 overs)
Jamie Dalrymple 104 (76); Tony Smith 2/45 (10 overs)		Andrew Jones 42 (81); Melvyn Betts 4/15 (7 overs)

Middlesex won by 174 runs
Lamphey Cricket Club Ground, Lamphey
Umpires: Rob Bailey and Vanburn Holder
Player of the match: Jamie Dalrymple (Middx)

5–6 May 2004
Scorecard

Wiltshire	v	Nottinghamshire Outlaws

Match abandoned without a ball bowled
Wellhead Lane, Westbury
Umpires: Graham Burgess

- Reserve day used, match was abandoned due to rain and was rearranged

5–6 May 2004
Scorecard

Worcestershire Royals; 279/8 (47 overs)	v	Herefordshire; 146/4 (29 overs)
Ben Smith 91 (98); Simon Roberts 3/36 (8 overs)		Richard Hall 54 (86); Andy Bichel 1/22 (8 overs)

Worcestershire won by 18 runs (D/L method)
New Road, Worcester
Umpires: Hugh Evans and Alan Whitehead
Player of the match: Ben Smith (Worcs)

- Reserve day used

5–6 May 2004
Scorecard

Leicestershire Foxes; 156 (47.2 overs)	v	Devon; 156/9 (50 overs)
Paul Nixon 33* (49); Andrew Procter 3/26 (7 overs)		Robert Dawson 42 (92); Jonathan Dakin 3/40 (8 overs)

Devon won as they lost fewer wickets
The Maer Ground, Exmouth
Umpires: Richard Illingworth and Roy Palmer
Player of the match: Robert Dawson (Devon)

- Reserve day used

5–6 May 2004
Scorecard

Sussex Sharks; 245 (49.4 overs)	v	Durham Dynamos; 223 (48.4 overs)
Chris Adams 68 (70); Ian Pattison 3/45 (10 overs)		Andrew Pratt 44 (49); Mohammad Akram 4/61 (10 overs)

Sussex won by 22 runs
Riverside Ground, Chester-le-Street
Umpires: Steve Garratt and Jeremy Lloyds
Player of the match: Chris Adams (Sssx)

- Reserve day used

5–6 May 2004
Scorecard

Surrey Brown Caps; 261 (49.5 overs)	v	Ireland; 262/5 (48.2 overs)
Ali Brown 67 (49); Andrew White 3/43 (10 overs)		Jason Molins 58 (57); Azhar Mahmood 2/60 (9.2 overs)

Ireland won by 5 wickets
Clontarf Cricket Club Ground, Dublin
Umpires: Nigel Llong and George Sharp
Player of the match: Andrew White (Ire)

- Reserve day used

5–6 May 2004
Scorecard

Shropshire; 119 (42.5 overs)	v	Warwickshire Bears; 121/2 (21 overs)
James Ralph 38 (42); Dougie Brown 4/30 (10 overs)		Ian Bell 58 (37); Anthony O'Connor 2/27 (5 overs)

Warwickshire won by 8 wickets
Edgbaston, Birmingham
Umpires: John Hampshire and Tim Robinson
Player of the match: Ian Bell (Warks)

- Reserve day used

17 May 2004
Scorecard

Wiltshire; 186/7 (50 overs)	v	Nottinghamshire Outlaws; 189/4 (38.2 overs)
Jimmy Adams 43 (74); Paul Franks 3/27 (10 overs)		Chris Read 77 (67); Michael Coles 2/34 (7 overs)

Nottinghamshire won by 6 wickets
Trent Bridge, Nottingham
Umpires: Rob Bailey and Allan Jones
Player of the match: Chris Read (Notts)

- Match was originally scheduled for 5 May

=== Third round ===
26 May 2004
Scorecard

Yorkshire Phoenix; 411/6 (50 overs)	v	Devon; 279/8 (50 overs)
Matthew Wood 160 (124); Ian Bishop 2/90 (10 overs)		Robert Dawson 52 (27); Anthony McGrath 4/56 (9 overs)

Yorkshire won by 132 runs
The Maer Ground, Exmouth
Umpires: David Constant and Nigel Cowley
Player of the match: Matthew Wood (Yorks)

29 May 2004
Scorecard

Hampshire Hawks; 154 (46.1 overs)	v	Gloucestershire Gladiators; 157/7 (37.5 overs)
Dimitri Mascarenhas 52 (80); Jon Lewis 4/39 (10 overs)		Craig Spearman 50 (36); Shane Warne 4/23 (8.5 overs)

Gloucestershire won by 3 wickets
County Ground, Bristol
Umpires: John Steele and Peter Willey
Player of the match: Jon Lewis (Glos)

29 May 2004
Scorecard

Glamorgan; 256/8 (50 overs)	v	Middlesex; 260/4 (46.1 overs)
Matthew Elliott 85 (106); Chad Keegan 3/47 (10 overs)		Jamie Dalrymple 107 (108); David Harrison 2/45 (8 overs)

Middlesex won by 6 wickets
Lord's, London
Umpires: Barry Dudleston and Roy Palmer
Player of the match: Jamie Dalrymple (Middx)

- Middlesex won the toss and elected to field.

29 May 2004
Scorecard

Essex Eagles; 309/4 (50 overs)	v	Nottinghamshire Outlaws; 125 (21.2 overs)
Will Jefferson 126 (125); Paul Franks 2/59 (9 overs)		Chris Read 46 (43); Scott Brant 4/54 (7 overs)

Essex won by 184 runs
Trent Bridge, Nottingham
Umpires: Nigel Cowley and Pasty Harris
Player of the match: Will Jefferson (Essx)

29 May 2004
Scorecard

Lancashire Lightning; 242/7 (50 overs)	v	Sussex Sharks; 230/9 (50 overs)
Mark Chilton 62 (78); Mushtaq Ahmed 2/44 (10 overs)		Robin Martin-Jenkins 61 (73); Glen Chapple 3/44 (10 overs)

Lancashire won by 12 runs
County Ground, Hove
Umpires: Vanburn Holder and George Sharp
Player of the match: Mark Chilton (Lancs)

29 May 2004
Scorecard

Kent Spitfires; 211 (49.4 overs)	v	Warwickshire Bears; 215/1 (37.5 overs)
David Fulton 78 (97); Dewald Pretorius 3/43 (10 overs)		Mark Wagh 102* (128); Mohammad Sami 1/43 (8 overs)

Warwickshire won by 9 wickets
Edgbaston, Birmingham
Umpires: Tony Clarkson and David Constant
Player of the match: Mark Wagh (Warks)

29 May 2004
Scorecard

Somerset Sabres; 95 (27.3 overs)	v	Worcestershire Royals; 100/2 (14.3 overs)
Ian Blackwell 27 (49); Andy Bichel 4/17 (7 overs)		Andy Bichel * 38 (35); Nixon McLean 1/23 (5 overs)

Worcestershire won by 8 wickets
County Ground, Bristol
Umpires: Jeff Evans and Trevor Jesty
Player of the match: Andy Bichel (Worcs)

30 May 2004
Scorecard

Ireland; 263/8 (50 overs)	v	Northamptonshire Steelbacks; 267/4 (41.5 overs)
Jeremy Bray 76 (108); Steffan Jones 6/56 (10 overs)		Martin van Jaarsveld 93* (87); Andre Botha 3/51 (10 overs)

Northamptonshire won by 6 wickets
Clontarf Cricket Club Ground, Dublin
Umpires: Mark Benson and Graham Burgess
Player of the match: Martin van Jaarsveld (Nthnts)

=== Quarter-finals ===
15 June 2004
Scorecard

Worcestershire Royals; 204 (50 overs)	v	Essex Eagles; 183 (48.1 overs)
Ben Smith 54 (72); Scott Brant 3/19 (10 overs)		Andy Flower 58 (98); Andy Bichel 3/27 (9.1 overs)

Worcestershire won by 21 runs
New Road, Worcester
Umpires: Peter Hartley and Alan Whitehead
Player of the match: Ben Smith (Worcs)

16 June 2004
Scorecard

Gloucestershire Gladiators; 239/8 (50 overs)	v	Middlesex Crusaders; 223/8 (50 overs)
Craig Spearman 62 (72); Paul Weekes 2/36 (10 overs)		Ed Joyce 53 (74); Mark Alleyne 3/31 (8 overs)

Gloucestershire won by 16 runs
County Ground, Bristol
Umpires: Trevor Jesty and Mervyn Kitchen
Player of the match: Craig Spearman (Glos)

16 June 2004
Scorecard

Lancashire Lightning; 286/5 (50 overs)	v	Yorkshire Phoenix; 287/7 (47.4 overs)
Carl Hooper 66 (67); Chris Silverwood 2/50 (8 overs)		Michael Vaughan 116 (109); Sajid Mahmood 3/56 (10 overs)

Yorkshire won by 3 wickets
Old Trafford, Manchester
Umpires: John Holder and Barrie Leadbeater
Player of the match: Michael Vaughan (Yorks)

16 June 2004
Scorecard

Warwickshire Bears; 343/4 (50 overs)	v	Northamptonshire Steelbacks; 270 (43.5 overs)
Brad Hogg 94* (61); Johann Louw 2/83 (10 overs)		David Sales 52 (51); Dougie Brown 5/43 (7.5 overs)

Warwickshire won by 73 runs
Edgbaston, Birmingham
Umpires: Barry Dudleston and George Sharp
Player of the match: Brad Hogg (Warks)

=== Semi-finals ===
17 July 2004
Scorecard

Yorkshire Phoenix; 243/6 (50 overs)	v	Gloucestershire Gladiators; 247/5 (46.1 overs)
Darren Lehmann 80 (90); Jon Lewis 2/49 (10 overs)		Craig Spearman 143 (122); Matthew Hoggard 2/33 (10 overs)

Gloucestershire won by 5 wickets
County Ground, Bristol
Umpires: Ian Gould and Allan Jones
Player of the match: Craig Spearman (Glos)

17 July 2004
Scorecard

Worcestershire Royals; 257/4 (50 overs)	v	Warwickshire Bears; 216 (47.4 overs)
Vikram Solanki 126 (132); Dougie Brown 2/50 (10 overs)		Dougie Brown 47 (54); Andrew Hall 3/37 (8.4 overs)

Worcestershire won by 41 runs
Edgbaston, Birmingham
Umpires: John Hampshire and Nigel Llong
Player of the match: Vikram Solanki (Worcs)

=== Final ===
28 August 2004
Scorecard

Worcestershire Royals; 236/9 (50 overs)	v	Gloucestershire Gladiators; 237/2 (43.5 overs)
Vikram Solanki 115 (136); James Averis 4/23 (10 overs)		Phil Weston 110 (129); Gareth Batty 1/42 (10 overs)

Gloucestershire won by 8 wickets
Lord's, London
Umpires: Neil Mallender and Peter Willey
Player of the match: Vikram Solanki (Worcs)

- This was the last 50 overs-a-side English domestic final to be played with white clothing and red balls.
