= Elwood =

Elwood may refer to the following:

== Places ==
=== In Australia ===
- Elwood, Victoria, a suburb of Melbourne

=== In the United States ===
- Elwood, Illinois, a village
- Elwood, Indiana, a city
- Elwood, Kansas, a city
- Elwood, Missouri, an unincorporated community
- Elwood, Nebraska, a village
- Elwood, New Jersey, an unincorporated community and census-designated place
- Elwood, New York, a census-designated place
- Elwood, Utah, a town

== People ==
=== First name ===
- Elwood Balderston (died 1921), American politician
- Elwood Thomas Baker (1854–1938), co-inventor of the card game gin rummy
- Elwood Barker (1878–1953), American politician
- Elwood Engel (1917–1986), Chrysler Corporation's design chief from 1961 until 1974
- Elwood Francis, a member of the American rock group ZZ Top
- E. Gordon Gee (born 1944), American academic administrator, President of West Virginia University
- Elwood V. Jensen (1920–2012), American molecular biologist
- Elwood Richard Quesada (1904–1993), American Air Force lieutenant general
- Elwood Towner (c. 1897–1954), Native American attorney and pro-Nazi speaker
- Elwood Wherry, American Presbyterian missionary
- Elwood Higginbotham (died 1935), African American murdered by lynching

=== Surname ===
- Augustus R. Elwood (1819–1881), American politician from New York
- Brian Elwood (born 1933), New Zealand public servant
- Courtney Simmons Elwood (born 1968), American attorney
- Edwin L. Elwood (1847–1907), American soldier
- Eric Elwood (born 1969), Irish rugby union player
- G. DeWitt Elwood (1818–1868), American politician from Wisconsin
- James Elwood (c. 1921–2021), British physician
- Jimmy Elwood (1901–1936), Irish footballer
- Joey Elwood, one of the founders of Gotee Records
- Marie Elwood (1932–2012), Canadian museum curator
- Paul Elwood (born 1958), American composer and banjo player
- Roger Elwood (1943–2007), American science fiction writer
- Sheri Elwood, Canadian screenwriter
- Thomas Elwood (disambiguation), various people

== Arts and entertainment ==
- Elwood Blues, a fictional character portrayed by Dan Aykroyd in the 1980 film The Blues Brothers
- Elwood P. Dowd, main character from the play and movie Harvey
- Elwood (American musician), a hip-hop/rock duo

== Schools ==
- Elwood College, a co-educational state high school in Melbourne, Victoria, Australia
- Elwood Jr/Sr High School, a public high school located in Elwood, Indiana

== Other uses ==
- Elwood (horse), 1904 Kentucky Derby winner
- Elwood (dog), winner of the 2007 World's Ugliest Dog Contest
- Elwood (sternwheeler), a steamboat that operated in Oregon, Washington and British Columbia
- Elwood Staffing, an American-based corporation offering staffing and payroll services
- Elwood Building, Rochester, New York, United States

== See also ==
- Ellwood (disambiguation)
