= Ellwood =

Ellwood may refer to:

== People ==
- Ellwood (surname)
- Ellwood (given name)

== Places ==
- Ellwood City, Pennsylvania
- Ellwood, Gloucestershire
- Ellwood, Ottawa
- Ellwood Oil Field, Goleta, California
- Ellwood (Leesburg, Virginia), a historic house

== Music ==
- Ellwood (band), a band from Solvang, California

== Schools ==
- Ellwood Christian Academy

== See also ==
- Elwood (disambiguation)
