= Moss Lane, Alderley Edge =

Cricket ground in England

Moss Lane
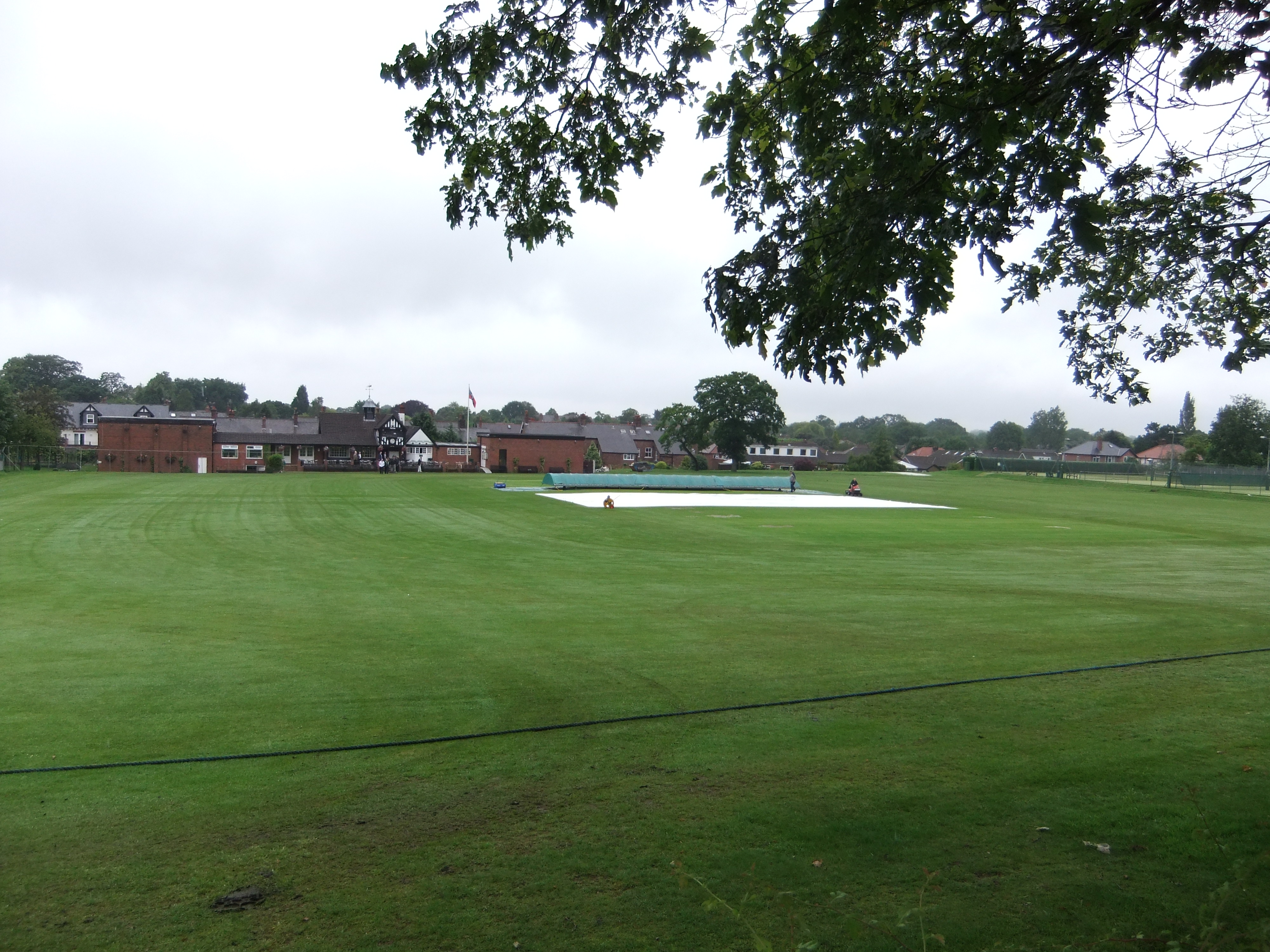
- Interactive map of Moss Lane

Ground information
- Location: Alderley Edge, Cheshire
- Country: England
- Coordinates: 53.3022°N 2.2293°W
- Establishment: 1870

Team information
| Lancashire | (2008) |
| Cheshire | (1973-present) |
- As of 11 July 2012; Source: Ground profile

Moss Lane is a cricket ground in Moss Lane, Alderley Edge, Cheshire. The ground is surrounded on all four sides by residential housing. The ground is used by Alderley Edge Cricket Club. It is also a venue for tennis, squash and field hockey.

== History ==
The ground was established in 1870, with Cheshire first playing there in the 1973 Minor Counties Championship against the Lancashire Second XI. Cheshire played two further Minor Counties Championship matches there, in 1975 and 1977, as well as playing there once in the 1980s when they played Durham in the same competition. Minor counties cricket did not return to the ground until 1998, when Cheshire played Shropshire in the Minor Counties Championship. Since then, Cheshire have played one match per–year at the ground. The ground held its first List A match in 2004, when Cheshire played first-class opponents Hampshire in the second round of the Cheltenham & Gloucester Trophy, with Hampshire winning due to half centuries by William Kendall and Dimitri Mascarenhas, as well as three wickets from Lawrence Prittipaul. The ground held a second List A match in 2008 when Lancashire played the touring Bangladesh A. Despite a fifty from Tamim Iqbal, the tourists lost the match by six wickets, with Francois du Plessis scoring 93 not out in the chase.

== Records ==
=== List A ===
- Highest team total: 273/8 (50 overs) by Hampshire v Cheshire, 2004
- Lowest team total: 182 all out (45.5 overs) by Bangladesh A v Lancashire, 2008
- Highest individual innings: 93* by Francois du Plessis for Lancashire v Bangladesh A, 2008
- Best bowling in an innings: 4/45 by Jason Whittaker for Cheshire v Hampshire, 2004

== Gallery ==
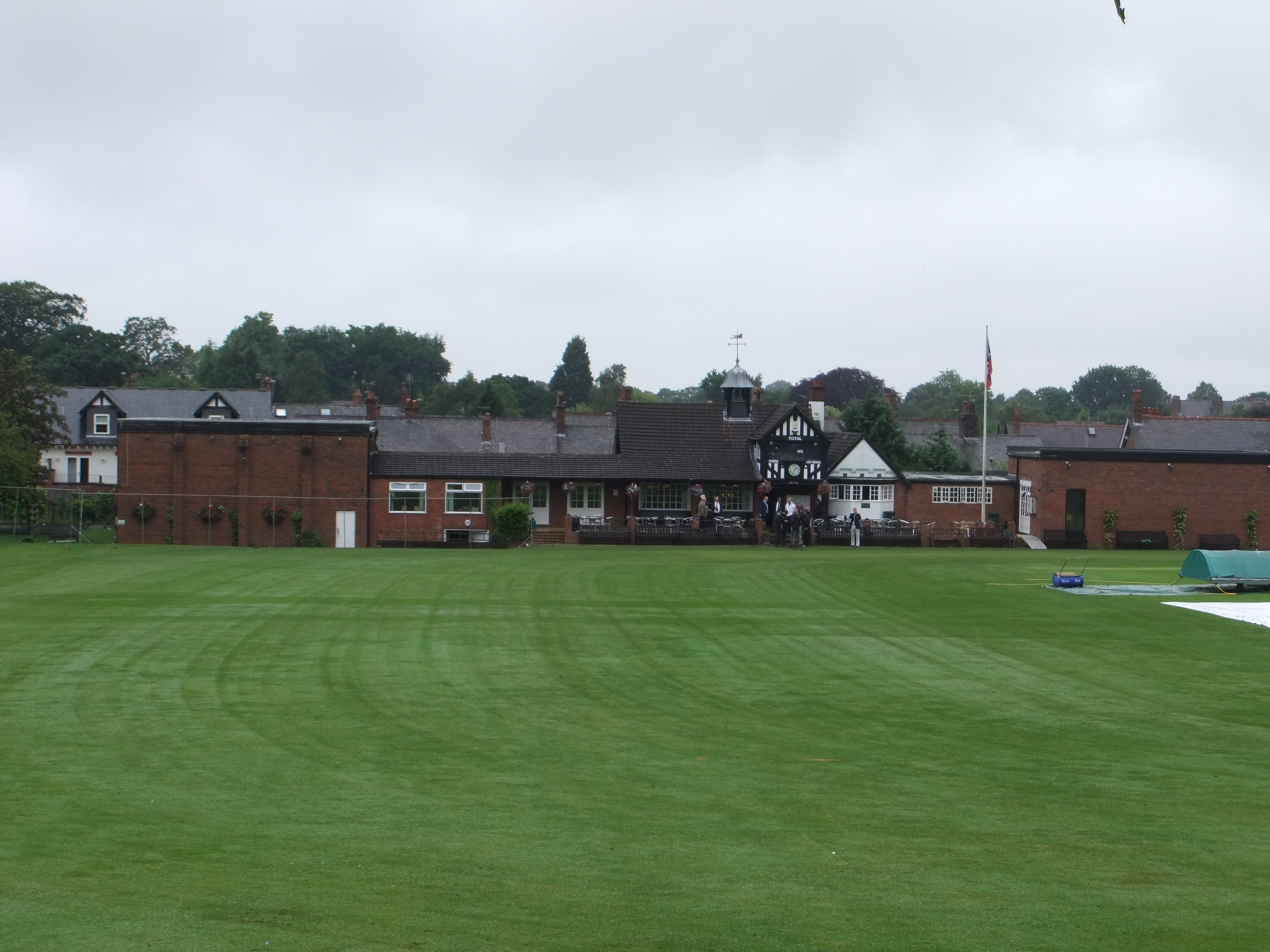
View of the pavilion.

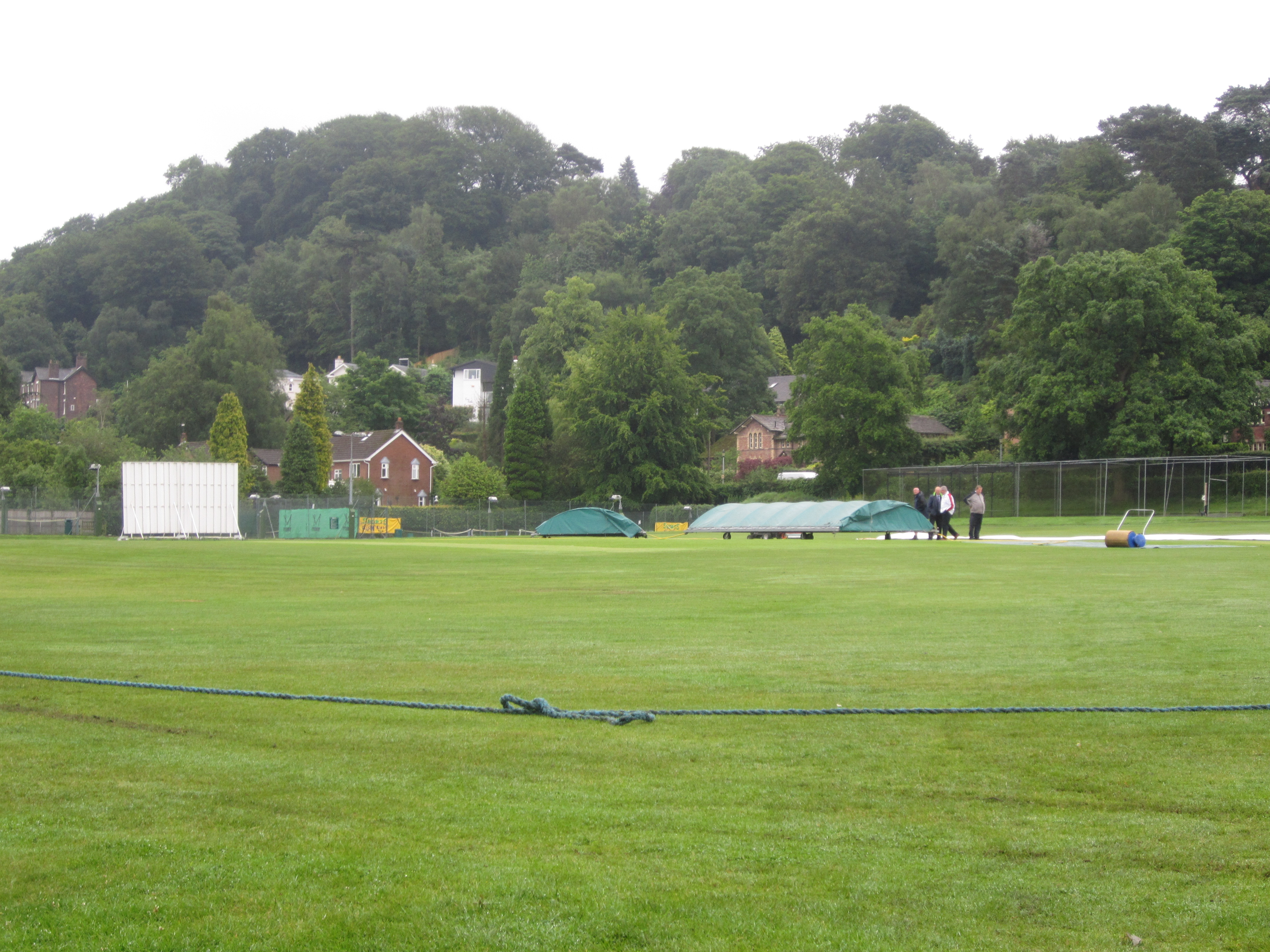
View of the ground looking south–east.

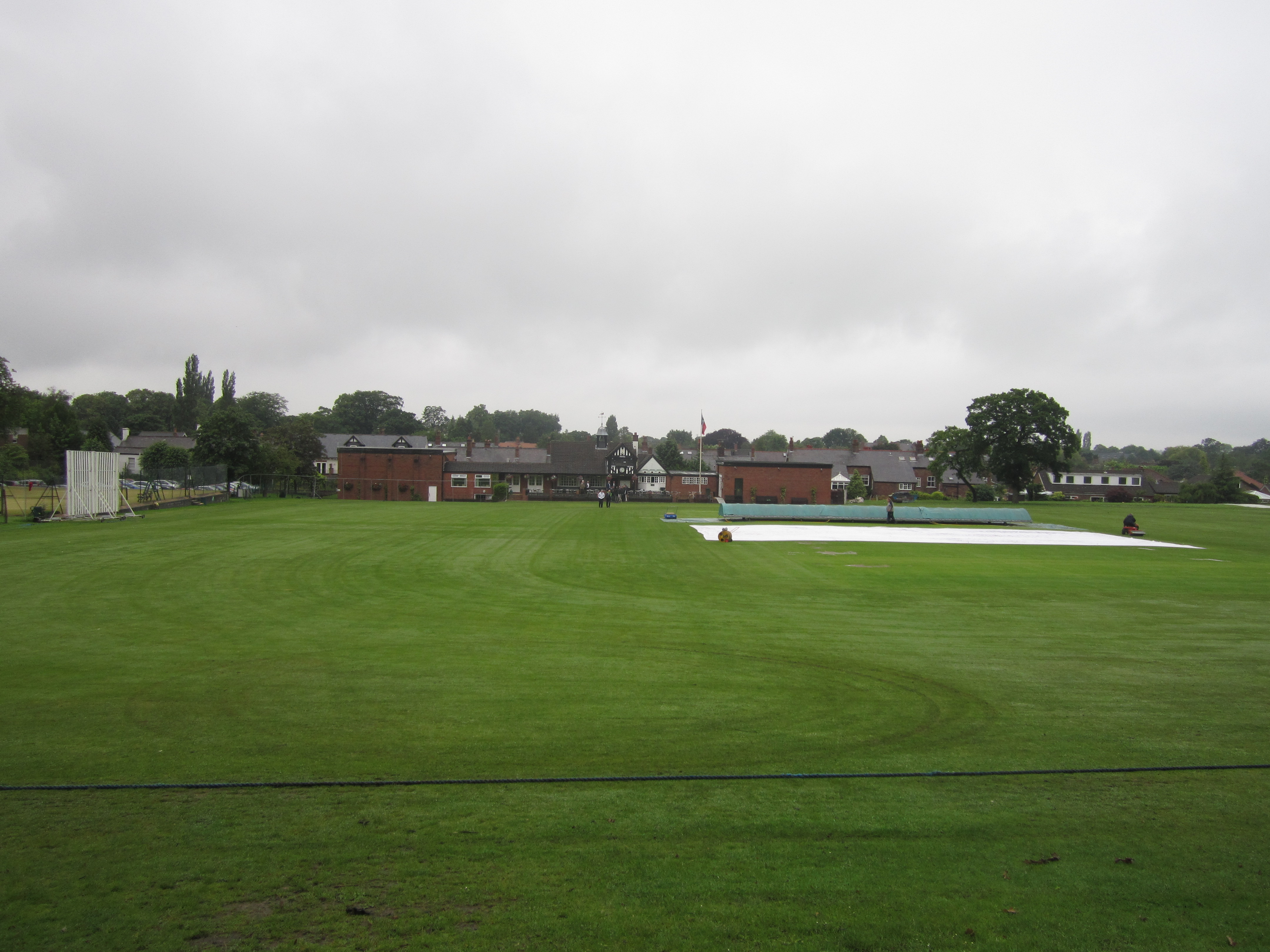
View of the ground toward the pavilion.

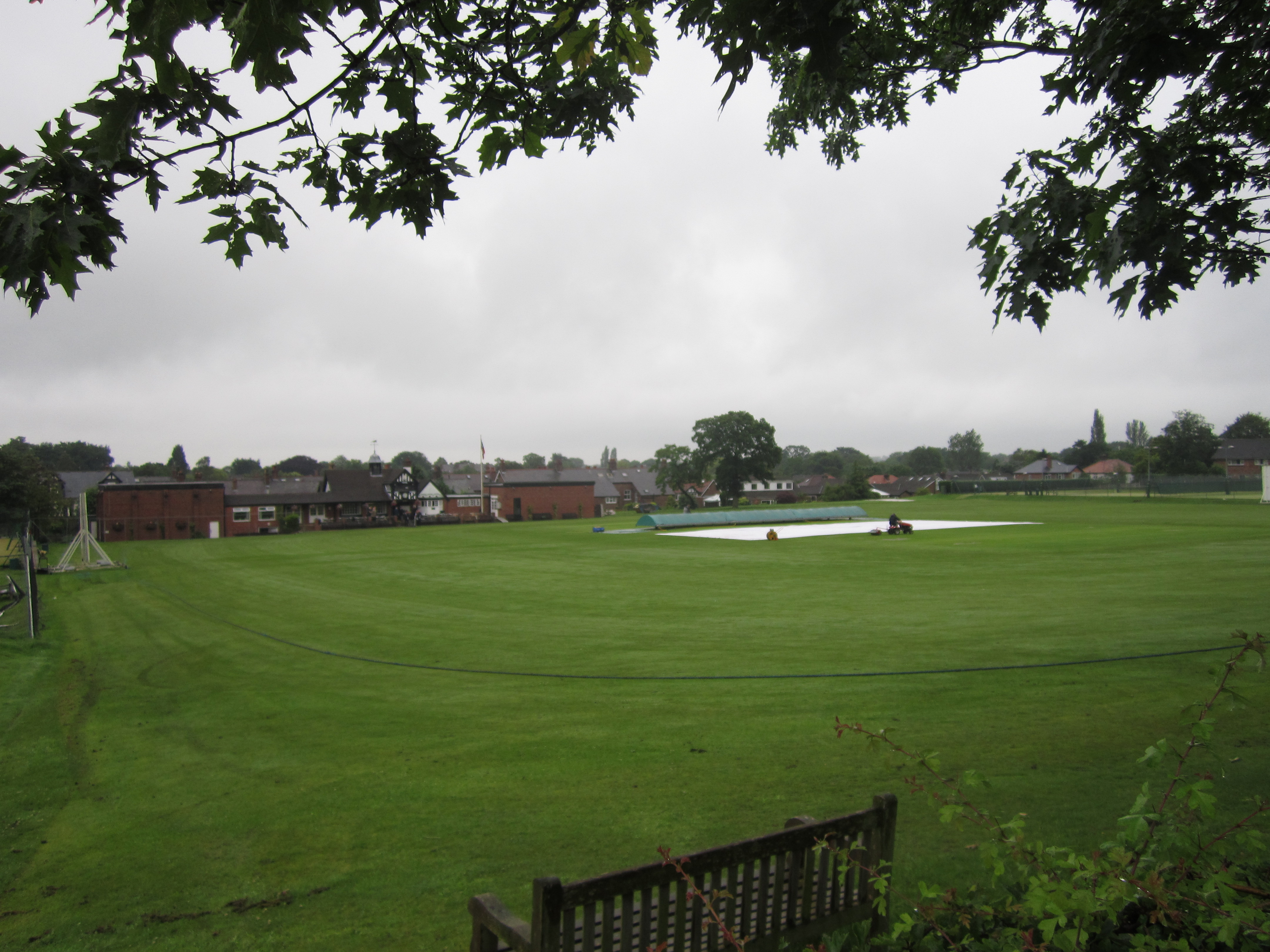
View of the ground from the south–west.

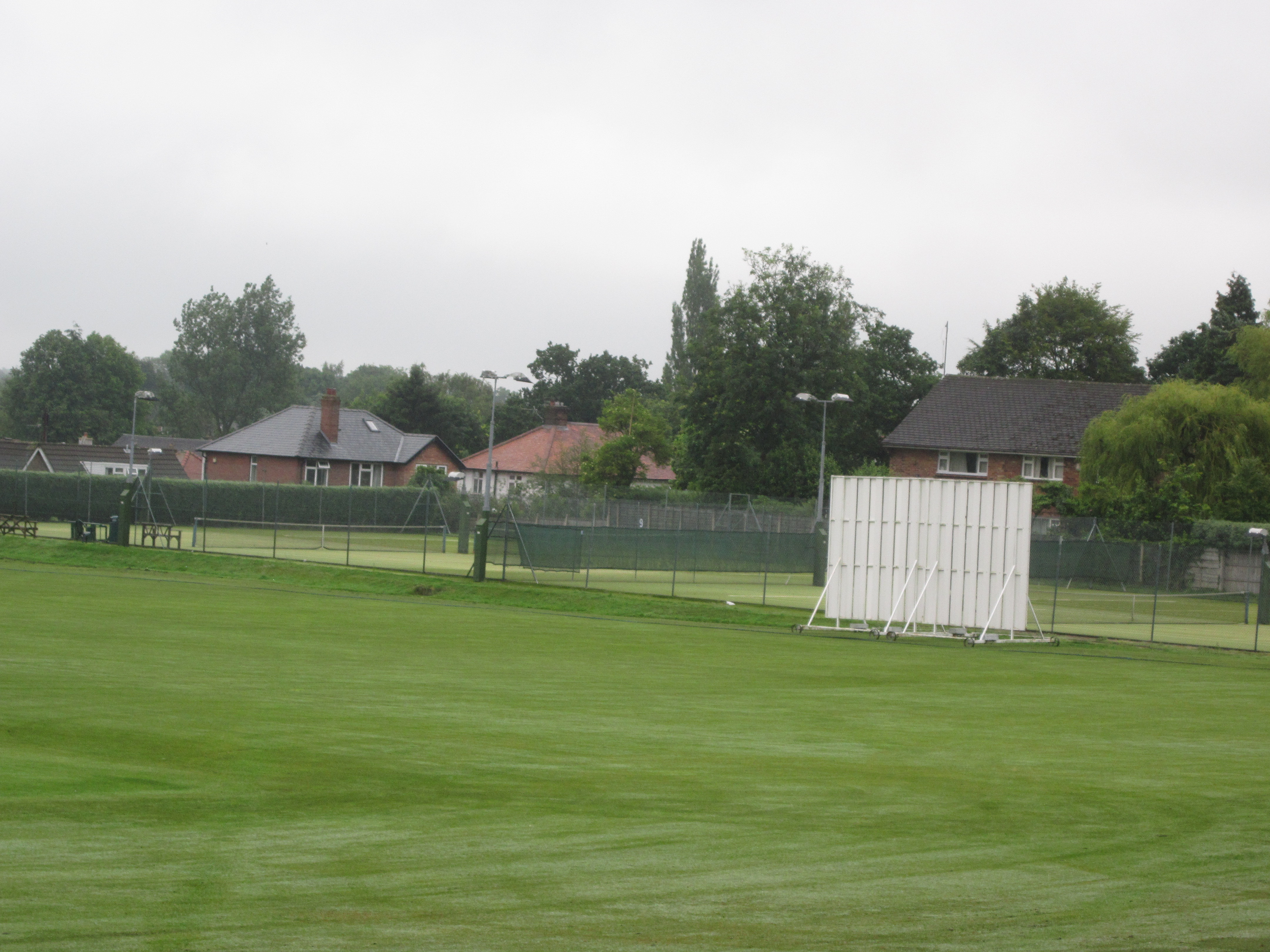
View of the tennis courts at the ground.

== See also ==
- List of cricket grounds in England and Wales
