= Robert Dawson (cricketer) =

English cricketer (born 1970)

Personal information
- Full name: Robert Ian Dawson
- Born: 9 March 1970 (age 56); Exmouth, Devon, England
- Batting: Right-handed
- Bowling: Leg break Right-arm medium

Domestic team information
- Years: Team
- 1992–1999: Gloucestershire
- 1988–2011: Devon

Career statistics
| Competition | First-class | List A |
|---|---|---|
| Matches | 64 | 129 |
| Runs scored | 2,598 | 2,792 |
| Batting average | 24.50 | 25.38 |
| 100s/50s | 3/12 | 1/13 |
| Top score | 127* | 138 |
| Balls bowled | 395 | 122 |
| Wickets | 8 | 3 |
| Bowling average | 24.87 | 45.00 |
| 5 wickets in innings | – | – |
| 10 wickets in match | – | – |
| Best bowling | 3/15 | 1/15 |
| Catches/stumpings | 31/– | 24/– |
- Source: Cricinfo, 13 February 2011

Robert 'Bob' Ian Dawson (born 29 March 1970) is a former English cricketer. Dawson is a right-handed batsman who bowls both leg break and right-arm medium pace. He was born in Exmouth, Devon.

== Early career ==
Dawson made his debut for Devon in the 1988 Minor Counties Championship against Wales Minor Counties. The following season he played his first MCCA Knockout Trophy match for the county against Dorset. Dawson was a frequent member of the Devon squad in his early years and it was for Devon that he made his debut in List A cricket, when the county played Somerset in the 1990 NatWest Trophy. Dawson's first senior outing was not a successful one, with Devon losing by a record margin of 346 runs and himself being dismissed for a duck by Dutchman Roland Lefebvre. A number of bright performances in Minor counties cricket caught the attention of Gloucestershire and in 1990 he represented their Second XI, first playing for them in August 1990 against the Warwickshire Second XI. Dawson made a further List A appearance for Devon in the 1991 NatWest Trophy against Essex, as well as playing a few more Minor counties fixtures before moving to Gloucestershire on a permanent basis.

== First-class career ==
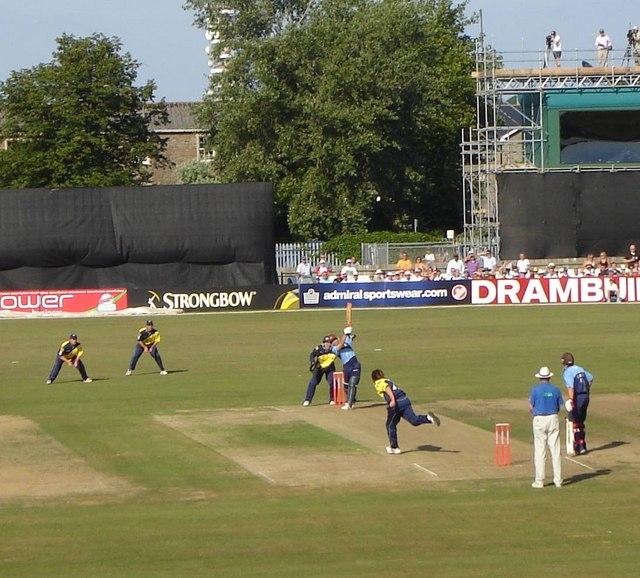
The County Ground, Bristol, where Dawson played for Gloucestershire from 1992 to 1999

Dawson's first team debut for Gloucestershire came in a Sunday League match against Nottinghamshire at Trent Bridge in May 1992. The following month he made his first-class debut against Lancashire at Old Trafford. Initially, Dawson was a regular feature in the Gloucestershire team. Primarily a batsman, in his first couple of seasons with the county he struggled with his batting form, averaging 11.00 and 21.87 in the 1992 and 1993 seasons respectively, although in the 1992 season he did record his maiden half century. The 1994 season was to prove to be Dawson's most productive in first-class cricket, making 16 first-class appearances and scoring 1,112 runs (the only time in his first-class career he would pass 1,000 runs in a season) at a batting average of 42.76. Indeed, with this season it seemed that Dawson's potential was beginning to be fulfilled as he cracked a maiden century, scoring 127* against Cambridge University and scoring seven half centuries.

The coming seasons were to see a reversal of his 1994 form as Dawson struggled for consistency. In 1995 he averaged 23.66 from 9 first-class matches, the following season just 11.75 from 7 matches. In 1997 and 1998, he played 8 matches in each season, averaging 23.50 and 13.61 respectively. By the time of his final season with Gloucestershire, Dawson was playing mostly in the Second XI, playing just a single first-class match in that final season against Middlesex in the County Championship. Dawson represented Gloucestershire in 64 first-class matches, scoring 2,598 runs at an average of 25.50, which perhaps highlighted his inconsistency with the bat. In the process he scored three centuries and twelve half centuries. An able fielder, he took 31 catches.

Dawson was perhaps seen as more of one-day player, representing Gloucestershire in 116 List A matches between 1992 and 1993. Dawson's struggles with consistency were also present in the one-day game, labelling some to question his mental strength to play at the highest domestic level. Dawson's batting average in one-day cricket fluctuated between the mid-teens to the high-twenties; his average only went above 30 for a season in 1998 when he scored 677 runs at an average of 37.61, with a high score of 75. In his 116 one-day matches for the county, he scored 2,300 runs at an average of 23.71, with nine half centuries and a high score of 85. Dawson's contract was not renewed by Gloucestershire for the 2000 season and he was released by the county, after making 180 appearances in total between 1992 and 1999.

== Return to Devon ==
Following his release by Gloucestershire, Dawson returned to playing Minor counties cricket for his home county Devon. His first senior match for them upon his return came in the 2000 NatWest Trophy 3rd round against Staffordshire. In the 2003 Cheltenham & Gloucester Trophy 2nd round against Cumberland which was played in 2002 to avoid fixture congestion, Dawson scored his only List A century, making 138 runs. A mainstay of the Devon line-up, where he often opened the batting, Dawson was made county captain in 2003 and the following season he led Devon to what is perhaps considered their most famous victory. The match in question was a 2nd round 2004 Cheltenham & Gloucester Trophy match against first-class opponents Leicestershire at The Maer Ground in Exmouth. Put into bat, Leicestershire were all out for 156 inside 50 overs, with Dawson himself claiming the wicket of John Sadler. In reply, Dawson contributed a score of 42, helping Devon to be tied on scores with Leicestershire, but winning due to being 9 wickets down, therefore winning by losing fewer wickets. In the 3rd round there were heavily defeated by Yorkshire, with Dawson scoring 52 runs, before being dismissed by Anthony McGrath. He played his final List A match the following season against Essex in the 1st round of the 2005 Cheltenham & Gloucester Trophy. Devon, along with the rest of the Minor counties were not permitted to play in domestic List A matches after this season.

During his time as captain he guided Devon to a shared 2004 Minor Counties Championship title with Bedfordshire following a drawn outcome in a rain affected match, and in 2006 he captained them to an outright victory against Buckinghamshire in the competition. During his tenure as captain, he also guided Devon to a single MCCA Knockout Trophy championship when Devon defeated Berkshire at Lord's in 2008, with Dawson himself scoring a crucial 96 before being dismissed by Carl Crowe. Dawson captained Devon until 2009, when he handed over the captaincy to Neil Hancock for the 2010 season. Following the 2011 season, Dawson called time on his county cricket career, having played a total of 105 Minor Counties Championship matches and 56 MCCA Knockout Trophy matches for Devon. His final appearance came against Cambridgeshire in the final of the Minor Counties Championship, which Devon won by 169 runs.
