= David Pearson =

David or Dave Pearson may refer to:

- David Pearson (librarian) (born 1955), British librarian and scholar
- David Pearson (racing driver) (1934–2018), American car racing champion
- David Pearson (geologist) (born 1942), Canadian scientist, academic and television personality
- Dave Pearson (American football) (born 1981), American offensive lineman
- Dave Pearson (painter) (1937–2008), English artist
- Dave Pearson (pool player), British speed pool champion and multiple Guinness Book world record holder
- Dave Pearson (rugby union) (born 1966), English rugby union referee
- David Lee Pearson (born 1974), Paralympic athlete
- Dave Pearson (footballer) (1932–2019), Scottish footballer
- David Pearson (cricketer) (born 1963), former English cricketer
- David Pearson (bowls), Scottish lawn bowler
- David Pearson (social care administrator), chair of the UK government's Social Care Sector COVID-19 Support Taskforce since 2020
- David Pearson (squash player) (born 1959), English squash player and coach
