= Elleray =

Elleray is a surname. Notable people with the surname include:

- David Elleray (born 1954), English football referee
- John Elleray (born 1946), English cricketer
- Peter Elleray (born 1958), English engineer and race car designer

== See also ==
- Ellery (surname)
- Ellory, surname
