= Dipak Patel =

Dipak Patel may refer to:

- Dipak Patel (politician) (born 1953), Zambian politician
- Dipak Patel (cricketer, born 1958), Kenyan cricketer who played for New Zealand
- Dipak Patel (cricketer, born 1961), Kenyan cricketer
