= Peter Kingston =

Peter Kingston may refer to:

- Peter Kingston (soccer) (born 2001), American soccer player
- Peter Kingston (artist) (1943-2022), Australian artist
- Peter Kingston (rugby union) (born 1951), English rugby union player

== See also ==
- Peter Kingston-Davey, English cricket umpire
