= Richard Kaufman =

Richard Kaufman may refer to:

- Richard J. Kaufman (born 1958), author, publisher, illustrator and editor
- Richard S. Kaufman, American television producer
- Richard Kaufman (cricketer) (born 1980), English cricketer

== See also ==
- Richard Kauffmann (1887–1958), German-Jewish architect
- Richard Kauffman (born 1955), the first New York State "energy czar"
- Dick Kauffman, baseball player
