= Chris Park =

Chris Park may refer to:

- Chris Park, former member of English boy band Phixx
- Chris Park (cricketer) (born 1983), English cricketer
- Christopher M. Park, designer of AI War: Fleet Command.

== See also ==
- Abyss (wrestler) (Chris Parks, born 1973), wrestler
