= Anthony O'Connor =

Anthony O'Connor may refer to:

- Anthony O'Connor (cricketer)
- Anthony O'Connor (footballer)
