= David Rooney =

David Rooney may refer to:

- David Rooney (cricketer) (born 1975), English cricketer
- David Rooney (Gaelic footballer) (born 1990), Gaelic footballer for Sligo

== See also ==
- Dave Rooney (1937–2006), teacher and politician
