= Moss Lane (disambiguation) =

Moss Lane is a football ground in Altrincham, Greater Manchester.

Moss Lane may also refer to:

- Moss Lane Cricket Ground, a former cricket ground in Moss Side, Manchester
- Moss Lane, Alderley Edge, a cricket ground in Alderley Edge, Cheshire
