= Christopher Kippax =

English cricketer

Personal information
- Full name: Christopher Richard Granville Kippax
- Born: 3 May 1969 (age 57); Leeds, Yorkshire, England
- Batting: Right-handed
- Relatives: Peter Kippax (father); Simon Kippax (brother)

Domestic team information
- Years: Team
- 2002: Cumberland

Career statistics
Competition	List A
Matches	1
Runs scored	5
Batting average	5.00
100s/50s	0/0
Top score	5
Balls bowled	30
Wickets	0
Bowling average	–
5 wickets in innings	–
10 wickets in match	–
Best bowling	–
Catches/stumpings	0/–
- Source: Cricinfo, 19 April 2020

Christopher Richard Granville Kippax (born 3 May 1969) is a former English cricketer. Kippax was a right-handed batsman. He was born in Leeds, Yorkshire.

Kippax played a single List A match for Cumberland in the Cheltenham & Gloucester Trophy against Devon in September 2002. Kippax scored five runs and bowled five wicket-less overs.

Between 1999 and 2001, Kippax played for Radcliffe-on-Trent in the Nottinghamshire Cricket Board Premier League and for Harrogate in the Yorkshire Premier League from 2003 to 2004.

His father, Peter, played first-class cricket for Yorkshire, while his brother, Simon, played List A cricket for Cumberland.
