= Tony Smith (English cricketer) =

English cricketer

Personal information
- Full name: Anthony Smith
- Born: 15 August 1961 (age 65); Burnley, Lancashire, England
- Batting: Right-handed
- Bowling: Slow left-arm orthodox

Domestic team information
- Years: Team
- 1989–2004: Wales Minor Counties
- 1993–1994: Minor Counties

Career statistics
Competition	List A
Matches	6
Runs scored	8
Batting average	4.00
100s/50s	0/0
Top score	6
Balls bowled	344
Wickets	9
Bowling average	20.77
5 wickets in innings	0
10 wickets in match	0
Best bowling	3/40
Catches/stumpings	4/–
- Source: Cricinfo, 13 May 2011

Anthony Smith (born 15 August 1961) is a former English cricketer. Smith was a right-handed batsman who bowled slow left-arm orthodox. He was born in Burnley, Lancashire.

Smith made his debut for Wales Minor Counties in the 1989 Minor Counties Championship against Cornwall. He played Minor counties cricket for Wales Minor Counties from 1989 to 2004, which included 35 Minor Counties Championship matches and 8 MCCA Knockout Trophy matches. He made his List A debut in the 1993 Benson & Hedges Cup for a combined Minor Counties cricket team against Durham. He played a further match for the team in the following season's competition against Sussex. It was in the 1993 season that he made his List A debut for Wales Minor Counties against Nottinghamshire in the NatWest Trophy. He played 3 further List A matches for the team, the last coming against Middlesex in the 2004 Cheltenham & Gloucester Trophy. In his 6 List A matches, he took 9 wickets at a bowling average of 20.77, with best figures of 3/40.
