= Simon Kippax =

English cricketer

Personal information
- Full name: Simon Alexander Jonathan Kippax
- Born: 8 May 1964 (age 62); Leeds, Yorkshire, England
- Batting: Right-handed
- Bowling: Leg break googly
- Relatives: Peter Kippax (father); Christopher Kippax (brother)

Domestic team information
- Years: Team
- 1995–2000: Cumberland

Career statistics
Competition	List A
Matches	5
Runs scored	32
Batting average	10.66
100s/50s	0/0
Top score	14*
Balls bowled	234
Wickets	5
Bowling average	33.00
5 wickets in innings	0
10 wickets in match	0
Best bowling	2/31
Catches/stumpings	3/–
- Source: Cricinfo, 29 March 2011

Simon Alexander Jonathan Kippax (born 8 May 1964) is a former English cricketer. Kippax was a right-handed batsman who bowled leg break googly. He was born in Leeds, Yorkshire.

Kippax made his debut for Cumberland in the 1995 MCCA Knockout Trophy against Wales Minor Counties. Kippax played Minor counties cricket for Cumberland from 1995 to 2000, including 35 Minor Counties Championship matches and 12 MCCA Knockout Trophy matches. In 1995, he made his List A debut against Worcestershire in the NatWest Trophy. He played four further List A matches for Cumberland, the last of which came against Cambridgeshire in the 2000 NatWest Trophy. In his five List A matches, he scored 32 runs at a batting average of 10.66, with a high score of 14 not out. With the ball he took 5 wickets at a bowling average of 33.00, with best figures of 2/31.

He also played Second XI cricket for the Essex Second XI and the Nottinghamshire Second XI. His father, Peter, played first-class cricket for Yorkshire, while his brother, Christopher, played List A cricket for Cumberland.
