= David Lye =

English cricketer

Personal information
- Full name: David Frank Lye
- Born: 11 April 1979 (age 47); Exeter, Devon, England
- Batting: Right-handed
- Bowling: Right-arm medium

Domestic team information
- Years: Team
- 1998–present: Devon

Career statistics
Competition	List A
Matches	10
Runs scored	265
Batting average	29.44
100s/50s	1/1
Top score	121
Balls bowled	16
Wickets	–
Bowling average	–
5 wickets in innings	–
10 wickets in match	–
Best bowling	–
Catches/stumpings	3/–
- Source: Cricinfo, 6 February 2011

David Frank Lye (born 11 April 1979) is an English cricketer. Lye is a right-handed batsman who bowls right-arm medium pace. He was born in Exeter, Devon.

Lye first played for Devon in 1998 against Wales Minor Counties in the Minor Counties Championship. Two years later he made his debut MCCA Knockout Trophy appearance for the county against Cornwall. In that same season he also made his debut in List A cricket against Staffordshire in the 2nd round of the 2000 NatWest Trophy. In the following round of that competition, he scored his maiden List A half century, making 56 runs before being dismissed by Saqlain Mushtaq. In 2003, he scored his only List A century against Suffolk in the 1st round of the 2004 Cheltenham & Gloucester Trophy which was played in 2003. Opening the batting, he made 121 runs before being dismissed by Philip Caley. In total, Lye played 10 List A matches in the period when Devon were permitted to take part in the domestic one-day tournament. In these 10 matches, he scored 265 runs at a batting average of 29.44.

Still a feature in the Devon team, as of the end of the 2010 season, he has played 55 Minor Counties Championship matches and 39 MCCA Knockout Trophy matches. In addition, Lye has played Second XI cricket for the Somerset Second XI (1994–1996) and the Middlesex Second XI (1996).
