= Andrew Jones (Welsh cricketer) =

Welsh cricketer

Personal information
- Full name: Andrew James Jones
- Born: 5 August 1972 (age 54); Swansea, Glamorgan, Wales
- Batting: Right-handed
- Relatives: Alan Jones (father); Eifion Jones (uncle)

Domestic team information
- Years: Team
- 1998: Minor Counties
- 1993: Glamorgan
- 1993–2009: Wales Minor Counties

Career statistics
Competition	List A
Matches	17
Runs scored	340
Batting average	21.25
100s/50s	–/2
Top score	93
Balls bowled	–
Wickets	–
Bowling average	–
5 wickets in innings	–
10 wickets in match	–
Best bowling	–
Catches/stumpings	6/–
- Source: Cricinfo, 13 May 2011

Andrew James Jones (born 5 August 1972) is a former Welsh cricketer. Jones was a right-handed batsman. He was born in Swansea, Glamorgan.

Jones made his debut for Wales Minor Counties in the 1992 Minor Counties Championship against Herefordshire. He played Minor counties cricket for Wales Minor Counties from 1992 to 2009, which included 58 Minor Counties Championship matches and 11 MCCA Knockout Trophy matches. He made his List A debut for Wales Minor Counties against Sussex in the 1993 NatWest Trophy. It was in 1993 that he made his only appearance for Glamorgan, in a List A match against Warwickshire. In 1998, he made 3 appearances for a combined Minor Counties cricket team in the Benson & Hedges Cup.

For Wales Minor Counties, he made 12 further List A appearances, the last coming against Nottinghamshire in the 2005 Cheltenham & Gloucester Trophy. In his 13 List A matches for the team, he scored 306 runs at a batting average of 25.50, with 2 half centuries and a high score of 93, which came against Denmark in the 2004 Cheltenham & Gloucester Trophy

His father, Alan and uncle Eifion, have both played first-class cricket.
