= Peter Kingston-Davey =

English cricket umpire

Peter William Kingston-Davey (22 October 1940) is a former English cricket umpire from Tiverton, Devon. In 1995, Kingston-Davey first stood as an umpire in a Minor Counties Championship match between Dorset and Wales Minor Counties. Two years later he stood in his first MCCA Knockout Trophy match, played between Dorset and Wales Minor Counties. He stood in his first List A match in the 1999 NatWest Trophy played between Devon and Berkshire. Between 1999 and 2003 he stood in 5 List A matches, the last of which he stood in was between Devon and Suffolk in the 1st round of the 2004 Cheltenham & Gloucester Trophy which was held in 2003. Peter-Kingston stood as an umpire in Minor counties cricket until 2006, by which time he had stood in 39 Minor Counties Championship matches and 15 MCCA Knockout Trophy matches.

He made headlines in 2006, when he had to stand in for fellow umpire Guy Randall-Johnson, when he walked out of a Minor Counties Championship match after being on the receiving end of abuse from Berkshire players after he gave Berkshire captain Julian Wood out LBW, with Kingston-Davey standing in for the remaining 2 days of the 3 day match.
