= Stephen Ogilby =

Irish cricketer (born 1976)

Personal information
- Full name: Stephen Ogilby
- Born: 5 April 1976 (age 50); Strabane, County Tyrone, Northern Ireland
- Batting: Right-handed
- Role: Wicket-keeper

International information
- National side: Ireland

Domestic team information
- Years: Team
- 2001–2005: Cheshire
- 1995: Ireland

Career statistics
Competition	First-class	List A
Matches	2	6
Runs scored	0	37
Batting average	0.00	12.33
100s/50s	–/–	–/–
Top score	0	36
Balls bowled	–	–
Wickets	–	–
Bowling average	–	–
5 wickets in innings	–	–
10 wickets in match	–	–
Best bowling	–	–
Catches/stumpings	8/–	1/–
- Source: Cricinfo, 1 April 2011

Stephen Ogilby (born 15 April 1976) is an Irish cricketer. Ogilby is a right-handed batsman who plays as a wicket-keeper. He was born in Strabane, County Tyrone, Northern Ireland.

Ogilby made his List A debut for Ireland in the 1995 Benson and Hedges Cup against Somerset, with him playing one further List A match for Ireland in the same competition against Yorkshire. He later joined Cheshire in England, making his debut for the county in the Minor Counties Championship against Wiltshire. Ogilby played Minor counties cricket for Cheshire from 2001 to 2005, including nineteen Minor Counties Championship matches and seven MCCA Knockout Trophy matches. He played List A cricket for Cheshire, with his final List A match coming against Hampshire in the 2004 Cheltenham & Gloucester Trophy. He played a total of four List A matches for Cheshire, scoring 37 runs at a batting average of 18.50, with a high score of 36. Behind the stumps he took 8 catches and made a single stumping. His highest score with the bat came against Hampshire in his final List A match, in a watchful innings which was ended by Michael Clarke.

In 2004, he played two first-class matches for Ireland in the first season of the Intercontinental Cup against the Netherlands and Scotland. In these matches he batted twice and was dismissed for a duck in both.
