= Andrew Procter (cricketer) =

English cricketer

Personal information
- Full name: Andrew John Procter
- Born: 7 September 1968 (age 58); Preston, Lancashire, England
- Batting: Right-handed
- Bowling: Right-arm off break

Domestic team information
- Years: Team
- 1996–2008: Devon

Career statistics
Competition	List A
Matches	10
Runs scored	114
Batting average	28.50
100s/50s	–/–
Top score	29*
Balls bowled	582
Wickets	14
Bowling average	30.07
5 wickets in innings	–
10 wickets in match	–
Best bowling	3/26
Catches/stumpings	1/–
- Source: Cricinfo, 6 February 2011

Andrew John Procter (born 7 September 1968) is an English cricketer. Procter was a right-handed batsman who bowled right-arm off break. He was born in Preston, Lancashire.

Procter first played for Devon in 1996 against Herefordshire in the Minor Counties Championship. It would be another four years before Procter represented Devon again, returning to the county for the 2000 season. During this season he made both his MCCA Knockout Trophy and List A debuts. Over the nest seven seasons, he represented Devon in 40 Championship matches, 27 Trophy matches, and 10 List A matches. In List A cricket, all of his appearances came for Devon at a time when there were permitted to take part in the domestic one-day tournament. He played his final List A match against Essex in the 1st round of the 2005 Cheltenham & Gloucester Trophy at The Maer Ground in Exmouth. In his 10 List A matches, he scored 114 runs at a batting average of 28.50, with a high score of 29*. With the ball he took 14 wickets at a bowling average of 30.07, with best figures of 3/26.
