= Peter Gibbs (weather forecaster) =

British weather forecaster

Peter John Gibbs is a former BBC Weather forecaster, who appeared regularly on BBC News, BBC World News and BBC Radio, particularly BBC Radio 4. He previously worked on the BBC News at One, BBC News at Six, BBC News at Ten and BBC Breakfast. He left the BBC on 9 December 2016.

== Early life ==
Gibbs was born in Sunderland, and brought up in Kendal, attending Kendal Grammar School. He graduated from the University of Newcastle upon Tyne in 1979 with an Honours degree in Physics and Geography. He started work at the British Antarctic Survey in Cambridge. He worked at the British Halley Research Station on the Brunt Ice Shelf for two years from October 1979 where he made routine observations of the weather and helped to maintain the base.

When he returned to the UK in May 1982 he joined the Met Office where he spent a year as a weather forecaster in training. He spent several years forecasting at RAF Honington in Suffolk and on the Benbecula island in the Outer Hebrides, where he forecast for the Army missile range on South Uist before moving to the Norwich Weather Centre in 1989.

== BBC career ==
His television debut as a forecaster was with BBC Norwich's Look East in 1993, and he moved to the BBC Weather Centre to join the BBC World team in October 1997. He began forecasting for other BBC channels in November 1998 and he now broadcasts across all BBC channels. He often hosts Gardeners' Question Time on Radio 4. He presented his final weather bulletin on BBC Radio 4 on Friday 9 December 2016.

== Honours ==
He was made an honorary Doctor of Laws by the University of Leeds in July 2018.
