= Joseph Wilson (English cricketer) =

English cricketer

Personal information
- Full name: Joseph Robert Wilson
- Born: 16 January 1965 (age 61); Birkenhead, Cheshire, England
- Batting: Right-handed
- Bowling: Right-arm medium

Domestic team information
- Years: Team
- 2002–2003: Dorset

Career statistics
Competition	List A
Matches	2
Runs scored	0
Batting average	–
100s/50s	0/0
Top score	0*
Balls bowled	108
Wickets	4
Bowling average	19.00
5 wickets in innings	0
10 wickets in match	0
Best bowling	2/36
Catches/stumpings	0/–
- Source: Cricinfo, 20 March 2010

Joseph Robert Wilson (born 16 January 1965) was an English cricketer. Wilson was a right-handed batsman who bowled right-arm medium pace.

Wilson made his debut for Dorset in the 2002 Minor Counties Championship against Cornwall. From 2002 to 2003, Wilson played 10 Minor Counties matches for Dorset, with his final appearance for the county coming against Wiltshire in 2003.

In 2002, Wilson made his List A debut for Dorset against the Worcestershire Cricket Board in the 1st round of the 2003 Cheltenham & Gloucester Trophy. Wilson made a further List-A appearance for the county against Buckinghamshire in the 1st round of the 2004 Cheltenham & Gloucester Trophy which was played in 2003.
