= Ronnie O'Reilly =

Irish cricket umpire

Ronald "Ronnie" O'Reilly (died 27 January 2015) was an Irish cricket umpire. Beginning in Irish Senior Cup matches, O'Reilly first officiated a match of note in 1996, when he umpired a women's One Day International between Ireland and New Zealand. Six years later, he stood in his second and final women's ODI, again between Ireland and New Zealand. O'Reilly also officiated in a single men's List A match, which was between Shropshire and Northumberland in the first round of the 2004 Cheltenham & Gloucester Trophy, which was played in 2003. O'Reilly died in Dublin in January 2015.
