= Paul Bradshaw (cricketer) =

English cricketer

Personal information
- Full name: Paul John Bradshaw
- Born: 1 May 1978 (age 48); Chelmsford, Essex, England
- Batting: Right-handed
- Bowling: Right-arm fast-medium

Domestic team information
- Years: Team
- 1995–present: Norfolk

Career statistics
Competition	List A
Matches	11
Runs scored	37
Batting average	7.40
100s/50s	–/–
Top score	20*
Balls bowled	591
Wickets	19
Bowling average	20.68
5 wickets in innings	–
10 wickets in match	–
Best bowling	4/30
Catches/stumpings	2/–
- Source: Cricinfo, 28 June 2011

Paul John Bradshaw (born 1 May 1978) is an English cricketer. Bradshaw is a right-handed batsman who bowls right-arm fast-medium. He was born in Chelmsford, Essex.

Bradshaw made his debut for Norfolk in the 1995 Minor Counties Championship against Bedfordshire. Bradshaw has played Minor counties cricket for Norfolk from 1995 to present, which has included 82 Minor Counties Championship matches and 54 MCCA Knockout Trophy matches. He made his List A debut against Warwickshire in the 1997 NatWest Trophy. He made 10 further List A appearances, the last coming against Lincolnshire in the 1st round of the 2004 Cheltenham & Gloucester Trophy, which was played 2003. In his 11 List A matches, he scored 37 runs at an average of 7.40, with a high score of 20 not out. As a bowler, Bradshaw took 19 wickets at a bowling average of 20.68, with best figures of 4/30. This came against the Netherlands in the 2002 Cheltenham & Gloucester Trophy.

Bradshaw has previously played Second XI cricket for the Essex, Leicestershire, Hampshire and Kent Second XIs.
