= Mark Burns (cricketer) =

English cricketer (born 1967)

Personal information
- Full name: Mark Ian Burns
- Born: 18 September 1967 (age 59); Bury, Greater Manchester, England
- Batting: Right-handed
- Bowling: Right-arm medium
- Role: Wicket-keeper

Domestic team information
- Years: Team
- 2002: Cumberland

Career statistics
Competition	List A
Matches	2
Runs scored	1
Batting average	1.00
100s/50s	–/–
Top score	1
Balls bowled	–
Wickets	–
Bowling average	–
5 wickets in innings	–
10 wickets in match	–
Best bowling	–
Catches/stumpings	4/2
- Source: Cricinfo, 27 March 2011

Mark Ian Burns (born 18 September 1967) is an English cricketer. Burns is a right-handed batsman who bowls right-arm medium pace and who fields as a wicket-keeper. He was born in Bury, Greater Manchester.

Burns made his debut for Cumberland in the 2002 MCCA Knockout Trophy against Northumberland. He played one more Trophy match in 2002, against the Durham Cricket Board. His Minor Counties Championship debut came against Suffolk in the same season, with Burms making a further appearance against Bedfordshire. In his sole season with Cumberland, Smith played two List A matches against the Nottinghamshire Cricket Board and Devon, both in the 2003 Cheltenham & Gloucester Trophy which was held in 2002. His only List A run came against Devon, with Burns being dismissed by Andrew Procter in that match. Behind the stumps he took 4 catches and made 2 stumpings.
