= Jason Whittaker (cricketer) =

English cricketer (born 1971)

Personal information
- Full name: Jason Peter Whittaker
- Born: 24 July 1971 (age 55); Farnworth, Lancashire, England
- Batting: Right-handed
- Bowling: Right-arm fast-medium

Domestic team information
- Years: Team
- 2001–2014: Cheshire

Career statistics
Competition	List A
Matches	4
Runs scored	31
Batting average	31.00
100s/50s	0/0
Top score	27
Balls bowled	224
Wickets	12
Bowling average	10.41
5 wickets in innings	0
10 wickets in match	–
Best bowling	4/45
Catches/stumpings	4/–
- Source: Cricinfo, 5 April 2011

Jason Peter Whittaker (born 24 July 1971) is a former English cricketer. Whittaker is a right-handed batsman who bowls right-arm fast-medium.

Whittaker made his debut for Cheshire in the 2001 Minor Counties Championship against Devon. Whittaker played Minor counties cricket for Cheshire from 2001 to 2014, including 38 Minor Counties Championship matches and 27 MCCA Knockout Trophy matches. In 2001, he made his List A debut against the Lancashire Cricket Board in the 2002 Cheltenham & Gloucester Trophy, with the 1st round played in 2001. He played three further List A matches for Cheshire, the last of which came against Hampshire in the 2004 Cheltenham & Gloucester Trophy. In his four List A matches, he scored 31 runs, with a high score of 27. With the ball he took 12 wickets at a bowling average of 10.41, with best figures of 4/45. His best figures came against Hampshire in 2004 and included the wickets of James Hamblin, Michael Clarke, Lawrence Prittipaul and Nic Pothas.

He also played Second XI cricket for the Sussex Second XI in 1995.
