= Ellwood (given name) =

Ellwood as a given name. Notable people with the name include:

- Ellwood Patterson Cubberley (1868–1941), American educator and author
- Ellwood Godfrey (1910–90), American field hockey player
- Ellwood Madill (1915–99), Canadian politician

== See also ==
- Ellwood (surname)
