= Ellery (surname) =

Origin
- Origin: Cornish
- Region of origin: Cornwall

Other names
- Variant forms: Ellaray, Elleray, Ellory, Elray, Hillary, Hillery, Illary, Allaire.

Ellery is a surname, and may refer to:

People:

- Christopher Ellery (1768–1840), American politician, Senator from Rhode Island
- David Ellery, British author and ship historian
- Georgia Ellery (born 1997), British musician
- John Ellery, British radio presenter and programme director
- Jason Haigh-Ellery, British television director
- Louise Ellery (born 1977), Australian athlete
- Paul Ellery, British radio presenter
- Reginald Spencer Ellery (1897–1955), a pioneer in the practice of psychiatry in Melbourne, Australia
- Robert L. J. Ellery (1827–1906), Government Astronomer of Victoria, Australia
- William Ellery (1720–1820), a signer of the United States Declaration of Independence and Continental Congressman from Rhode Island
- Steven Ellery, Australian V8 Supercar racecar driver
- David Peter Ellery QSM (22/12/1927-22/12/2006) New Zealand

== See also ==
- Elleray, surname
- Ellory, surname
