= Kirkbie Kendal School =

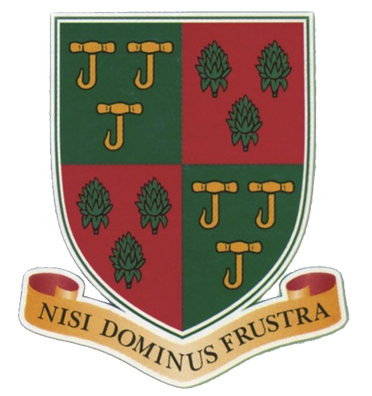

Location
- Lound Road; Kendal, Cumbria, LA9 7EQ; England
- 54°19′03″N 2°44′28″W

Information
- Type: Academy
- Mottoes: Latin: Nisi Dominus Frustra; Without the Lord, all is in vain Care, hard work, resilience and curiosity
- Established: 1525; 501 years ago
- Local authority: Westmorland and Furness
- Department for Education URN: 136671 Tables
- Ofsted: Reports
- Headteacher: Mark Harris
- Gender: Coeducational
- Age: 11 to 18
- Enrolment: 1048
- Colours: Green blazers, White t-shirt, Black Trousers and Black Shoes
- Website: http://www.kirkbiekendal.cumbria.sch.uk

Kirkbie Kendal School is an academy school and known as a Business and Enterprise College in Kendal, Cumbria, Northern England, and serves the area around the town and rural countryside. Kirkbie Kendal School operates as a Foundation school, and has been regularly oversubscribed, accepting students based on a designated hierarchy. The school has 1048 pupils on roll, ages 11–18.

== History ==
The school was formed in 1980 by the amalgamation of Kendal Grammar School and Kendal High School. The Grammar School had been founded in 1525, and from 1588 had been located alongside Kendal Parish Church then moved in 1889 to the building which is now the main block of KKS. Kendal High School for Girls opened in 1890 at a site on Thorney Hills.

== Programmes and curriculum ==
As a Business and Enterprise College status, Kirkbie Kendal School focuses on raising levels of attainment in business studies and related courses, mathematics and information technology. The school works with local businesses, colleges and universities to provide students with the skills needed to progress into higher or further education and employment or entrepreneurship. The school was re-designated as a Business and Enterprise College in 2008.

== Awards and recognition ==
In 2003, Kirkbie Kendal School was one of 14 schools in the North-East and Cumbria that were awarded specialist status by the Department for Education and Skills, entitling the school to its share of more than £2m worth of investment.

A team from the school won the regional final of the Institute of Physics 2004 Paperclip Physics Competition. The Kirkbie Kendal School team was recognized from among six finalists for its efforts in explaining concepts of density and buoyancy.

A student at the school was one of 25 regional winners in the 2006 Audi Innovation Awards competition, a national design competition for students ages 11–14. Over 4,000 entries were submitted to the competition from more than 200 schools.

For 2006, Kirkbie Kendal School was the North East Regional winner of the Charter Standard Secondary School award for outstanding achievement in providing football opportunities for their students. The school was also recognized in 2004.

== Academic performance ==
The school gets GCSE results at the England average and A-level results slightly above the England average.

=== OFSTED inspections ===
The school was inspected by OFSTED on the 23 and 24 September 2014. The school received two outstanding and the rest were in the category good.

== School Features ==
The school is medium-sized and in total there are 6 buildings on the school grounds. Those being the Main building, Humanities, Languages, Expressive Arts, Technology and the Science/Maths/ICT block.

== Former pupils ==
- Neil Ashton, actor
- James Ellison, Motorcycle Racer
- Three members (Neil and Scott Wilkinson, Matthew Wood) of the band British Sea Power

=== Kendal Grammar School ===
- Sir Edward Bailey MC, geologist (1892-9)
- Nigel Bell, chief executive of the NHS Information Authority from 1999 to 2001 (1970–1977)
- Robert Chorley, 1st Baron Chorley
- Peter Gibbs, BBC Weather forecaster (1969–76)
- David Starkey, English historian (1956–63)
- Carl Walker, former policeman (1945–50)
- David Wheatman, cricketer
- Philip Wilson, former Liberal MP for St Pancras South (1886–93)

=== Kendal High School for Girls ===
- Muriel Brunskill, contralto (1911-8)
