= Ellory =

Ellory is a surname. Notable people with the surname include:

- Alfred John Ellory (1920–2009), British musician
- Ellory Elkayem (born 1970), New Zealand film director
- R. J. Ellory (born 1965), English author

== See also ==
- Elleray, surname
- Ellery (surname)
