= Russell Lane =

English cricketer

Personal information
- Full name: Russell Paul Lane
- Born: 23 November 1973 (age 52); Hayes, London, England
- Batting: Left-handed
- Bowling: Right-arm medium

Domestic team information
- Years: Team
- 1995–2009: Buckinghamshire

Career statistics
Competition	List A
Matches	10
Runs scored	237
Batting average	23.70
100s/50s	0/2
Top score	95
Balls bowled	167
Wickets	4
Bowling average	51.50
5 wickets in innings	0
10 wickets in match	0
Best bowling	2/48
Catches/stumpings	4/–
- Source: Cricinfo, 2 May 2011

Russell Paul Lane (born 23 November 1973) is an English cricketer. Lane is a left-handed batsman who bowls right-arm medium pace. He was born in Hayes in the London Borough of Hillingdon.

Lane made his debut for Buckinghamshire in the 1995 Minor Counties Championship against Northumberland. Lane played Minor counties cricket for Buckinghamshire from 1995 to 2009, which included 45 Minor Counties Championship matches and 25 MCCA Knockout Trophy matches. In 1998, he made his List A debut against Surrey in the NatWest Trophy. He played nine further List A matches for Buckinghamshire, the last coming against Lancashire in the 2005 Cheltenham & Gloucester Trophy. In his ten List A matches, he scored 237 runs at a batting average of 23.70, with 2 half centuries and a high score of 95. This came against Dorset in the 2004 Cheltenham & Gloucester Trophy. With the ball he took 4 wickets at a bowling average of 51.50, with best figures of 2/48.

He also played Second XI cricket for the Middlesex Second XI.
