= Damian Worrad =

English cricketer (1974–2018)

Personal information
- Full name: Damian Jo Lomax Worrad
- Born: 6 November 1974; Crewe, Cheshire, England
- Died: 31 July 2018 (aged 43); Perth, Western Australia
- Batting: Right-handed
- Bowling: Right-arm fast-medium

Domestic team information
- Years: Team
- 2002–2004: Dorset

Career statistics
Competition	List A
Matches	2
Runs scored	17
Batting average	14.50
100s/50s	0/0
Top score	17
Balls bowled	78
Wickets	3
Bowling average	20.00
5 wickets in innings	0
10 wickets in match	0
Best bowling	2/31
Catches/stumpings	0/–
- Source: Cricinfo, 21 April 2019

Damian Jo Lomax Worrad (6 November 1974 – 31 July 2018) was an English cricketer. Worrad was a right-handed batsman who bowled right-arm fast.

Worrad made his debut for Dorset in the 2002 Minor Counties Championship against Wales Minor Counties. From 2002 to 2004, Worrad played 9 Minor Counties matches for Dorset, with his final appearance for the county coming against Cornwall in 2004.

In 2002, Worrad made his List A debut for Dorset against the Worcestershire Cricket Board in the 1st round of the 2003 Cheltenham & Gloucester Trophy which was played in 2002. Worrad made a further List A appearance for the county against Yorkshire in the 2nd round of the 2004 Cheltenham & Gloucester Trophy. In his final appearance he dismissed England Test players Craig White and Chris Silverwood.

Worrad died of a heart attack in July 2018, in Australia, where he had been living since 2005.
