= Richard Hall (English cricketer) =

English cricketer (born 1978)

Personal information
- Full name: Richard Jonathon Hall
- Born: 27 September 1978 (age 48); Worcester, Worcestershire, England
- Batting: Left-handed
- Bowling: Slow left-arm orthodox

Domestic team information
- Years: Team
- 1998–2010: Herefordshire

Career statistics
Competition	LA
Matches	1
Runs scored	54
Batting average	–
100s/50s	–/1
Top score	54*
Balls bowled	–
Wickets	–
Bowling average	–
5 wickets in innings	–
10 wickets in match	–
Best bowling	–
Catches/stumpings	1/–
- Source: Cricinfo, 24 November 2010

Richard Jonathon Hall (born 27 September 1978) is an English cricketer. Hall is a left-handed batsman who bowls slow left-arm orthodox. He was born at Worcester, Worcestershire.

Hall made his debut for Herefordshire in the 1998 Minor Counties Championship against Devon. From 1998 to 2009, he represented the county in 22 Championship matches, the last of which came against Cheshire. His MCCA Knockout Trophy debut for the county came against the Worcestershire Cricket Board in 1998. From 1998 to present, he has represented the county in 18 Trophy matches. It was for Herefordshire that he made his only List A appearance, which came against Worcestershire in the 2004 Cheltenham & Gloucester Trophy. In this match he made an unbeaten half century score of 54* and took a single catch in the field.
