= John Moyes (cricketer) =

English cricketer (1946–2024)

Personal information
- Full name: John Robert Moyes
- Born: 2 December 1946; Ipswich, Suffolk, England
- Died: 2 April 2024 (aged 77); Cockermouth, Cumbria, England
- Batting: Right-handed
- Bowling: Right-arm off break
- Role: Occasional wicket-keeper
- Relatives: James Moyes (son)

Domestic team information
- Years: Team
- 1973–1993: Cumberland
- 1966–1968: Suffolk

Career statistics
Competition	List A
Matches	6
Runs scored	53
Batting average	8.83
100s/50s	0/0
Top score	37
Catches/stumpings	2/–
- Source: Cricinfo, 31 March 2011

John Robert Moyes (2 December 1946 – 2 April 2024) was an English cricketer. Moyes was a right-handed batsman who bowled right-arm off break and who occasionally fielded as a wicket-keeper. He was born in Ipswich, Suffolk.

Moyes initially played Minor Counties Championship cricket for Suffolk between 1966 and 1968. He later joined Cumberland, making his debut for the county in the 1973 Minor Counties Championship against the Yorkshire Second XI. Moyes played Minor counties cricket for Cumberland from 1973 to 1993, including 127 Minor Counties Championship matches and 15 MCCA Knockout Trophy matches. In 1984, he made his List A debut against Derbyshire in the NatWest Trophy. He played five further List A matches for Cumberland, the last of which came against Lancashire in the 1989 NatWest Trophy. In his six List A matches, he scored 53 runs at a batting average of 8.83, with a high score of 37.

Moyes also played Second XI cricket for the Essex Second XI. His son, James, played first-class cricket for Cambridge University and List A cricket for Cumberland.

Moyes died in Cockermouth, Cumbria on 2 April 2024, at the age of 77.
