= Thomas Prime =

English cricketer

Personal information
- Full name: Thomas Edmund Howard Prime
- Born: 16 October 1977 (age 49); Kendal, Cumbria, England
- Batting: Right-handed

Domestic team information
- Years: Team
- 2000–2001: Cumberland

Career statistics
Competition	List A
Matches	2
Runs scored	9
Batting average	4.50
100s/50s	0/0
Top score	9
Catches/stumpings	0/–
- Source: Cricinfo, 28 March 2011

Thomas Edmund Howard Prime (born 16 October 1977) is a former English cricketer who played two List A cricket matches for Cumberland County Cricket Club in 2001. He was born in Kendal, Cumbria.

Prime made his debut for Cumberland in the 2000 Minor Counties Championship against Norfolk. He played one further Championship match the following season against Cambridgeshire. Also in 2001, Prime played his only MCCA Knockout Trophy match against the Yorkshire Cricket Board. In 2001, he played two List A matches against the Worcestershire Cricket Board and Kent in the 2001 Cheltenham & Gloucester Trophy. In the match against the Worcestershire Cricket Board he scored 9 runs before being dismissed by Claude Henderson. In the match against Kent, he was dismissed for a duck by Ben Trott.
