= Ellwood Christian Academy =

Location
- 1 Bell Rd, Selma, AL 36701; Selma, Alabama 36701; United States; 32°25′29″N 87°03′00″W

Information
- Former name: Central Christian Academy (until 2010)
- CEEB code: 012427
- Headmaster: Gary Crum
- Faculty: 20.8
- Enrollment: 265 (2016)
- Mascot: Eagle
- Website: www.buildup.work/eca

Ellwood Christian Academy is a private, coeducational PK-12 Christian school in Selma, Alabama. It serves 269 students.

About half of the enrollment, all black in 2016, take advantage of a $7500 Alabama tax credit to attend the school.

== History ==
The Ellwood Community Church took over Central Christian Academy in 2010, changing its name to Ellwood.
