= David Pearson (social care administrator) =

British social care administrator

Sir David Charles Pearson, CBE, is a British social care administrator and former social worker. He has chaired the UK government's Social Care Sector COVID-19 Support Taskforce since 2020.

== Early life and education ==
David Charles Pearson was born in Gravesend, Kent. His father was a bank manager. He attended a nearby grammar school, where he was head boy and played cricket and rugby. He left with A-Levels in English and History. He credits the experiences of caring for his mentally grandmother as spurring him on to work with disadvantaged people. After finishing school, he spent a year as a community service volunteer at an intermediate treatment centre for young offenders in Corby, Northamptonshire. In 1978 took up a place to study applied social studies at Nottingham Trent Polytechnic (now Nottingham Trent University or NTU), graduating in 1982 with a BA. The course also involved completing the Certificate of Qualification in Social Work. He completed a diploma in public services management in 1997 and an MSc in the same subject at NTU in 2004.

== Career ==
=== Local government ===
Pearson joined Nottinghamshire County Council as a social worker in 1982. Three years later, he became an approved social worker and a team manager. In 1992, he was appointed an area service manager for health and disability. In 1996, he was promoted to be a project manager involved in local government reform, where he worked on the development of Nottingham unitary authority, the transfer of social care services in the city to the City Council and the subsequent restructuring of the county's social services. He held this post until 1998. Pearson subsequently conducted a review of the county's residential care homes for the elderly; of the 26 homes, 15 were closed, and five new ones were built. He then spent six months as district manager for Gedling, before he was appointed temporary assistant director to oversee remaining changes to the residential homes. After 12 months, in 2001 he was appointed Assistant Director for Resources, managing finance, personnel and IT in the social services department. In 2004, he moved to be the department's Assistant Director for Adults.

In 2005, Pearson was appointed Director of Social Services at the county council. He served in the role until 2006. He was then Director of Adult Social Care between 2006 and 2019 (latterly as Corporate Director of Adult Social Care, Health and Public Protection). He also covered for the office of Director for Corporate Services between 2008 and 2009, and was Deputy Chief Executive of the council between 2008 and 2019. After stepping down in January 2019, he was succeeded as Corporate Director for Adult Social Care and Health by Melanie Brookes.

In 2016, Pearson was appointed to lead a sustainability and transformation plan for Nottingham and Nottinghamshire, which lead to the creation of the Nottingham and Nottinghamshire Integrated Care System (ICS) in 2019. He became the ICS's inaugural chairman and will step down from the post in March 2021.

=== National government ===
In June 2020, Pearson was appointed chairman of Social Care Sector Covid-19 Support Taskforce as part of the government's response to the COVID-19 pandemic in the United Kingdom.

== Honours and awards ==
Pearson served as president of the Association of Directors of Adult Social Services between 2014 and 2015. He was appointed a Commander of the Order of the British Empire (CBE) in the 2016 Birthday Honours for "services to Adult Social Care". In 2019, he was awarded an honorary Doctor of Social Science degree by Nottingham Trent University. He was knighted in the 2021 New Year Honours for "services to Health and Social Care Integration".
