= Thomas Elwood =

Thomas Elwood may refer to:

- Thomas Ellwood (1639–1714), English religious writer
- Thomas Elwood (MP) (died 1612), English politician
