= Ellwood (surname) =

Ellwood is a surname. Notable people with the name include:

- Annabel Ellwood (born 1978), Australian tennis player
- Sir Aubrey Ellwood (1897–1992), British Royal Air Force commander
- Ben Ellwood (born 1976), Australian tennis player
- Charles A. Ellwood (1873–1946), American sociologist
- Craig Ellwood (1922–1992), American modernist architect
- David T. Ellwood (fl. 1970s–2010s), American academic
- Doug Ellwood (fl. 1960s), New Zealand rugby league player
- Eddy Ellwood (born 1964), British world champion bodybuilder and professional strongman
- Fionnuala Ellwood (born 1964), Irish-born actress
- Frank Ellwood (born 1935), American football player and coach
- Isaac L. Ellwood (1833–1910), American rancher, businessman and barbed wire entrepreneur
- Katie Ellwood (fl. 2000s–2020s), British film and television director
- Paul M. Ellwood Jr. (1926–2022), American health care organization pioneer
- Reuben Ellwood (1821–85), American politician
- Richard Ellwood (born 1965), English cricketer
- Robert S. Ellwood (born 1933), American academic
- Thomas Ellwood (1639–1714), English religious writer
- Tobias Ellwood (born 1966), British politician
