= Richard Kaufman (cricketer) =

English cricketer (born 1980)

Personal information
- Full name: Richard Ian Kaufman
- Born: 25 December 1980 (age 45); Kettering, Northamptonshire, England
- Batting: Right-handed
- Bowling: Right-arm off break

Domestic team information
- Years: Team
- 2003–present: Oxfordshire
- 2001–2002: Northamptonshire Cricket Board

Career statistics
Competition	LA
Matches	3
Runs scored	9
Batting average	4.50
100s/50s	–/–
Top score	7
Balls bowled	120
Wickets	3
Bowling average	32.33
5 wickets in innings	–
10 wickets in match	–
Best bowling	2/48
Catches/stumpings	2/–
- Source: Cricinfo, 21 November 2010

Richard Ian Kaufman (born 25 December 1980) is an English cricketer. Kaufman is a right-handed batsman who bowls right-arm off break. He was born at Northampton, Northamptonshire.

Kaufman initially represented the Northamptonshire Cricket Board, making his debut in List A for them against Northumberland in the 2000 NatWest Trophy. He played a further List A match for the Board against the Yorkshire Cricket Board in the 2001 Cheltenham & Gloucester Trophy.

In 2003, he joined Oxfordshire, making his Minor Counties Championship debut for the county against Berkshire. From 2003 to present, he has represented the county in 29 Championship matches. His debut for the county in the MCCA Knockout Trophy came against Dorset in 2003. From 2003 to present, he has represented the county in 19 Trophy matches.

Kaufman also represented Bedfordshire in a single List A match when they were permitted to take part in the Cheltenham & Gloucester Trophy. This came against Herefordshire in the 1st round of the 2004 Cheltenham & Gloucester Trophy which was played in 2003.

In his career total of 3 List A matches, he scored 9 runs at a batting average of 4.50, with a high score of 7, while in the field he took 2 catches. With the ball he took 3 wickets at a bowling average of 32.33, with best figures of 2/48.

Kaufman also currently works as the Head of Cricket at The Leys School Cambridge.
