= James Moyes (cricketer) =

English cricketer

Personal information
- Full name: James Robert Moyes
- Born: 16 December 1974 (age 51); Workington, Cumberland, England
- Batting: Right-handed
- Role: Wicket-keeper
- Relatives: John Moyes (father)

Domestic team information
- Years: Team
- 2002: Cambridge University
- 1994–2001: Cumberland

Career statistics
Competition	First-class	List A
Matches	3	1
Runs scored	51	12
Batting average	10.20	12.00
100s/50s	0/0	0/0
Top score	35	12
Catches/stumpings	6/0	0/0
- Source: Cricinfo, 28 March 2011

James Robert Moyes (born 16 December 1974) is an English cricketer. Moyes is a right-handed batsman who fields as a wicket-keeper. He was born in Workington, Cumberland.

Moyes attended Cockermouth School and Durham University. He made his debut for Cumberland in the 1994 Minor Counties Championship against Lincolnshire, and played Minor counties cricket for Cumberland to 2001, including 38 Minor Counties Championship matches and six MCCA Knockout Trophy matches. During his time with Cumberland he played a single List A match against the Worcestershire Cricket Board in the 2001 Cheltenham & Gloucester Trophy. In this match he scored 12 runs before being dismissed by Gareth Williams.

Continuing his education at Cambridge, he made his first-class debut for Cambridge University against Middlesex in 2002. He played two further first-class matches in that season, against Essex and Oxford University. In his three first-class matches, Moyes scored 51 runs at a batting average of 10.20, with a high score of 35. Behind the stumps he took 6 catches.

His father, John, played List A cricket for Cumberland.
