= Stephen Bloyce =

English cricketer

Stephen Bloyce (born 11 November 1980) was an English cricketer. He was a right-handed batsman and a right-arm medium-fast bowler who played for Berkshire. He was born in Reading.

Bloyce began his career in the Minor Counties Championship for Berkshire. He played a single List A match, in the 2004 C&G Trophy, against Kent. From the tailend, he scored a duck, and took figures of 1-66 from 6 overs.

He continued to play for Berkshire until 2005. Between 2005 and 2006 he played in the Cockspur Cup for Finchampstead.
