= Chris Park (cricketer) =

English cricketer

Christopher Park
Personal information
- Full name: Christopher Leslie Park
- Born: 23 July 1983 (age 43); Poole, Dorset, England
- Batting: Right-handed
- Role: Wicketkeeper

Domestic team information
- Years: Team
- 2001 & 2004–present: Dorset
- 2002: Northamptonshire Cricket Board

Career statistics
Competition	LA
Matches	3
Runs scored	61
Batting average	20.33
100s/50s	–/–
Top score	35
Balls bowled	–
Wickets	–
Bowling average	–
5 wickets in innings	–
10 wickets in match	–
Best bowling	–
Catches/stumpings	1/ –
- Source: Cricinfo, 20 March 2010

Christopher Leslie Park (born 23 July 1983) is an English cricketer. Park is a right-handed batsman who plays primarily as a wicketkeeper.

In 2001, Park made his debut for Dorset in the Minor Counties Championship against Cornwall. From 2001 to the present, he has represented the county in 27 Minor Counties matches.

In 2001, Park made his List-A debut for Dorset against Scotland in the 2nd round of the 2002 Cheltenham & Gloucester Trophy, which was played in 2001. Parks second and to date last List-A appearance for Dorset came against Yorkshire in the 2nd round of the 2004 Cheltenham & Gloucester Trophy.

Park also played a single List-A match for the Northamptonshire Cricket Board against the Yorkshire Cricket Board in the 2003 Cheltenham & Gloucester Trophy which was played in 2002.
