= Robert Mason (cricketer) =

English Batman

Robert William Mason (born 19 December 1983) is an English cricketer. He was a left-handed batsman who played for Cumberland. He was born in Whitehaven.

Mason, who played for the side in the Minor Counties Championship between 2001 and 2006, made his debut List A appearance in 2002, against Devon. From the upper-middle order, he scored a duck.

Mason's second and List A appearance came the following year, in which he once again failed to score a run.

In April 2010, he had his first child named Skye Mason. In February 2023, he married Carol Ferguson.
