= Colin Knight =

English cricketer

Personal information
- Full name: Colin Richard Knight
- Born: 24 May 1956 (age 70); Barrow-in-Furness, Lancashire, England
- Batting: Right-handed
- Role: Wicket-keeper

Domestic team information
- Years: Team
- 1987–1992: Cumberland

Career statistics
Competition	List A
Matches	1
Runs scored	21
Batting average	21.00
100s/50s	–/–
Top score	21
Balls bowled	–
Wickets	–
Bowling average	–
5 wickets in innings	–
10 wickets in match	–
Best bowling	–
Catches/stumpings	–/–
- Source: Cricinfo, 1 April 2011

Colin Richard Knight (born 24 May 1956) is a former English cricketer. Knight was a right-handed batsman who fielded as a wicket-keeper. He was born in Barrow-in-Furness, Lancashire.

Knight made his debut for Cumberland in the 1987 Minor Counties Championship against Durham. Knight played Minor counties cricket for Cumberland from 1987 to 1992, including 19 Minor Counties Championship matches and 6 MCCA Knockout Trophy matches. In 1992, he played his only List A match against Essex in the NatWest Trophy. In this match he scored 21 runs before being dismissed by Don Topley.
