= Robert Smith (Cumberland cricketer) =

English cricketer (born 1982)

Robert Smith (born 1 February 1982) was an English cricketer. He was a left-handed batsman who played for Cumberland.

Smith made a single List A appearance for the team, in the Cheltenham & Gloucester Trophy in August 2001. He scored 3 runs in his innings, as opponents Warwickshire CB won by a narrow margin, thanks mostly to a century from Jim Troughton.
