= Stuart Horne =

English cricketer (born 1979)

Stuart Horne (born 13 September 1979) was an English cricketer. He was a right-handed batsman and right-arm off-break bowler who played for Cumberland. He was born in Barrow-in-Furness.

Horne played Minor Counties cricket for Cumberland between 1997 and 2003, and made his only List A appearance for the side during the 2001 season, against Worcestershire Cricket Board. From the lower-middle order, he scored 2 not out.
