= Simon Philbrook =

English cricketer (born 1965)

Simon Philbrook (born 11 October 1965) was an English cricketer. He was a right-handed batsman who played for Cumberland. He was born in Luton, Bedfordshire.

Philbrook made a single List A appearance for the team during the 1986 NatWest Trophy competition. Batting in the middle order, he scored 14 not out in the only innings in which he batted.

Philbrook continued to represent Cumberland in the Minor Counties Championship until 1990.
