= Nick Walker (cricketer) =

English cricketer (born 1984)

Personal information
- Full name: Nicholas Guy Eades Walker
- Born: 7 August 1984 (age 42); Enfield, Middlesex, England
- Batting: Right-handed
- Bowling: Right-arm fast medium
- Role: Bowler

Domestic team information
- Years: Team
- 2001–2003: Hertfordshire
- 2004–2005: Derbyshire
- 2006–2007: Leicestershire
- 2009–2011: Hertfordshire

Career statistics
Competition	FC	LA	T20
Matches	31	30	8
Runs scored	558	189	25
Batting average	19.24	9.94	25.00
100s/50s	0/3	0/0	0/0
Top score	80	43	16*
Balls bowled	4,106	792	102
Wickets	67	23	7
Bowling average	42.29	32.17	15.71
5 wickets in innings	2	0	0
10 wickets in match	0	0	0
Best bowling	5/59	4/26	3/19
Catches/stumpings	13/–	13/–	0/–
- Source: ESPNcricinfo, 28 March 2025

Nicholas Guy Eades Walker (born 7 August 1984) is an English former professional cricketer. He played as a right-arm medium-fast bowler for Derbyshire from 2004 to 2006 and Leicestershire from 2006 to 2008.

Born at Enfield in 1984, Walker was educated at Haileybury and Imperial Service College and studied at Durham University, but chose to leave his course after two academic terms.

After playing Minor Counties and List A cricket for Hertfordshire from 2001 to 2003, Walker made his first-class debut for Derbyshire in April 2004. He started his career strongly, excelling with both bat and ball, particularly against Somerset. On debut, he took six wickets, including four in the first innings, on what was described as "a typically flat Taunton wicket." A number of impressive batting performances, including a score of 80 with 11 fours and four sixes in a second match against Somerset, saw Walker employed as a pinch hitter in one-day cricket, although his aggressive approach was not always successful. He did not, however, maintain his early form and lost his regular place in the first team, despite being described as "bowler capable of bowling quickly and taking wickets at county level", the 2005 season was "erratic" and at the end of it he was offered only a month-by-month contract by Derbyshire and chose to move to Leicestershire for the 2005 season. He took 32 wickets in 13 first-class matches for the county, but failed to establish himself as a first-team regular and was released from his contract in February 2008 at the age of 23, choosing to pursue a career in the City of London. He continued to play Minor Counties cricket for Hertfordshire until the end of the 2011 season.
