= Guy Randall-Johnson =

English cricketer and umpire

Guy Philip Randall-Johnson (born 8 December 1959) is a former English cricketer and umpire from Crediton, Devon. Randall-Johnson initially played Minor counties cricket for Devon between 1987 and 1991. In 1993, Randall-Johnson first stood as an umpire in a Minor Counties Championship match between Dorset and Wales Minor Counties. Two years later he stood in his first MCCA Knockout Trophy match, played between Cornwall and Devon. He stood in his first List A match in the 1999 NatWest Trophy played between the Somerset Cricket Board and Bedfordshire. Between 1999 and 2003 he stood in 7 List A matches, the last of which he stood was between Dorset and Buckinghamshire in the 1st round of the 2004 Cheltenham & Gloucester Trophy which was held in 2003. Randall-Johnson stood as an umpire in Minor counties cricket until 2008, by which time he had stood in 54 Minor Counties Championship matches and 25 MCCA Knockout Trophy matches. He made headlines in 2006 for walking out of a Minor Counties Championship match after being on the receiving end of abuse from Berkshire players after he gave Berkshire captain Julian Wood out LBW. After not getting an apology from the players, he walked out of the game, with others having to deputise for him.
