= Scott Brant (cricketer) =

Zimbabwean cricketer (born 1983)

Personal information
- Full name: Scott Andrew Brant
- Born: 26 January 1983 (age 43); Harare, Zimbabwe
- Batting: Right-handed
- Bowling: Left-arm fast-medium
- Role: Bowler

Domestic team information
- Years: Team
- 2001/02–2007/08: Queensland
- 2003–2004: Essex

Career statistics
Competition	FC	LA	T20
Matches	26	51	9
Runs scored	115	52	6
Batting average	6.76	7.42	6.00
100s/50s	0/0	0/0	0/0
Top score	23	14*	5*
Balls bowled	4,285	2,277	188
Wickets	73	62	11
Bowling average	30.49	28.90	21.90
5 wickets in innings	1	0	0
10 wickets in match	0	–	–
Best bowling	6/45	4/25	4/20
Catches/stumpings	8/–	11/–	3/–
- Source: Cricinfo, 15 November 2024

Scott Andrew Brant (born 26 January 1983) is a former Zimbabwean cricketer who played domestic cricket for Queensland and Essex between 2002 and 2008.

Brant was born in Harare. A left-arm medium-fast bowler, his senior cricket career began in the 2001–02 Australian cricket season, where he played for Queensland. Having played in the Pura Cup for two years and being part of Queensland's title in 2001/02, he joined Essex the following year. An average of less than 30, and a best bowling tally of 6 for 45 couldn't save Essex from immediate relegation, however. Brant played frequently for Essex in the first half of the 2004 season, before being dropped from the first team. He later played again for Queensland.
