= David Wheatman =

English cricketer

Personal information
- Full name: David Mark Wheatman
- Born: 31 January 1966; Kendal, Westmorland, England
- Died: 24 October 2004 (aged 38); Lancaster, Lancashire, England
- Batting: Right-handed
- Bowling: Left-arm fast-medium

Domestic team information
- Years: Team
- 1990–2001: Cumberland

Career statistics
Competition	List A
Matches	4
Runs scored	9
Batting average	4.50
100s/50s	–/–
Top score	8*
Balls bowled	120
Wickets	2
Bowling average	37.50
5 wickets in innings	–
10 wickets in match	–
Best bowling	2/23
Catches/stumpings	–/–
- Source: Cricinfo, 28 March 2011

David Mark Wheatman (31 January 1966 – 24 October 2004) was an English cricketer. Wheatman was a right-handed batsman who bowled left-arm fast-medium. He was born in Kendal, Westmorland and was educated at Kendal Grammar School.

Wheatman made his debut for Cumberland in the 1990 Minor Counties Championship against Suffolk. He played Minor counties cricket for Cumberland infrequently to 2000, including 23 Minor Counties Championship matches and six MCCA Knockout Trophy matches. Wheatman made his List A against Kent in the 2000 NatWest Trophy. He played three further List A matches for the county to 2001. In his four List A matches, he scored 9 runs at a batting average of 4.50, with a high score of 8*. With the ball he took 2 wickets at a bowling average of 37.50, with best figures of 2/23.

Outside of the county game, he played for Netherfield Cricket Club and was employed as an insurance broker with Talbot Insurance Brokers. He died in St John's Hospice, Lancaster, Lancashire on 24 October 2004 following a two-year battle with cancer, leaving behind his partner and one daughter.
