= Matthew Rawnsley =

English cricketer

Cricket information
- Batting: Right-handed
- Bowling: Slow left arm orthodox

Career statistics
Competition	First-class	List A
Matches	46	54
Runs scored	522	137
Batting average	11.10	7.61
100s/50s	0/0	0/1
Top score	39	61
Balls bowled	7,130	2,105
Wickets	74	53
Bowling average	44.36	29.75
5 wickets in innings	3	1
10 wickets in match	1	0
Best bowling	6/44	5/26
Catches/stumpings	23/–	11/–
- Source: CricketArchive, 6 December 2022

Matthew James Rawnsley (born 8 June 1976) is a former English cricketer who played county cricket at first-class and List A level for Worcestershire. He later played minor counties cricket, as well as making two List A appearances, for Herefordshire. Since retiring from playing professional cricket, he has had a successful career in business and has most recently returned to professional sport within administration.

In 2018, he returned to Worcestershire as chief executive., but resigned in late 2019. He is now CEO at Edgbaston Priory Club in Birmingham which hosts international racquets tournaments for Tennis and Squash, including 'The Classic', the Ladies grass tournament that precedes the Wimbledon Championships.

During his playing career, Rawnsley played exactly 100 matches for Worcestershire across all formats, often in tandem in one day cricket with Richard Illingworth, the former England spinner. Rawnsley was a miserly spinner with an impressive runs per over rate of 4.49 in list A cricket. He was also an outstanding fielder in the ring and as a sweeper on the boundary. A talent which was recognised by the ECB when he was asked to be fielding 12th man in home series against West Indies, Australia and Pakistan. Rawnsley also won the Denis Compton young cricketer of the year award in 1998, and according to David Boon took the 'catch of the century' at short leg against Durham in the championship fixture at New Road. Comfortably his most significant season was 2001, when he played 15 first-class and 21 List A games. In that season, he took 27 first-class wickets – albeit at an expensive average of 44.85 – and 21 List A wickets at 34.19; in both cases, these were the highest season's aggregates of his career.

However, Rawnsley's best individual bowling performances came in other years. His first-class career best of 6–44 was achieved in the second innings against Oxford University at The University Parks in 1998; he also claimed 5–72 in the first innings to pick up his only ten-wicket match haul. His best one-day performance of 5–26 came in a National League game against Kent at Tunbridge Wells.

In general, Rawnsley was not a particularly accomplished batsman in first-class cricket, never reaching the milestone of a half-century, although he scored three hundreds for the Worcestershire second XI, including his highest score of 133 not out in 1997. and many more in the Birmingham League for West Bromwich Dartmouth. However, he did contribute with the bat on one of his two List A appearances for Herefordshire: playing against Oxfordshire in the C&G Trophy at Bodicote. In an easy win for Herefordshire, Rawnsley scored 61 as well as taking 3–8. He is currently playing for Ombersley Cricket Club in the Birmingham League.
