= Greig Williamson =

Scottish cricketer (born 1968)

Grieg Williamson
Personal information
- Born: 20 December 1968 (age 57); Glasgow, Scotland
- Batting: Right-handed
- Bowling: Right-arm medium

Career statistics
Competition	ODI
Matches	2
Runs scored	11
Batting average	5.50
100s/50s	0/0
Top score	10
Catches/stumpings	0/0
- Source: ESPNcricinfo, 19 April 2007

John Greig Williamson (born 28 December 1968) is a Scottish former cricketer. He is a right-handed batsman and a right-arm medium-pace bowler.

Having won his first cap in 1989, Williamson has played two One Day Internationals and has also played in the ICC Trophy for eight years, since 1997, having won the accolade of being one of Scotland's "Cricketers of the year" in 1996. He was also the first person to reach 150 caps for Scotland across all formats. Williamson is a qualified solicitor.
