= Lynching of Elwood Higginbotham =

1935 killing of an African American

In September 1935, Elwood Higginbottom was lynched by a white mob in Oxford, Mississippi.

== Background ==
Elwood Higginbotham was a 29 year old African American tenant farmer. He was indicted and jailed for allegedly shooting his landholder in self-defense. It appeared that a conviction was unlikely.

== Murder ==
On September 17, 1935, a mob broke into his cell and abducted him. He was lynched at the intersection of North Lamar Boulevard and Molly Barr Road.

No one was ever prosecuted for his murder. His mother and family fled Mississippi after the lynching.

== Legacy ==
After Higginbotham's lynching, NAACP Secretary Walter White wrote to President Franklin Roosevelt to call for a federal anti-lynching bill.

In 2018, a plaque was placed where he was believed to have been lynched.
