= Mathew Dowman =

English cricketer

Personal information
- Full name: Mathew Peter Dowman
- Born: 10 May 1974 (age 52); Grantham, Lincolnshire, England
- Batting: Left-handed
- Bowling: Right arm medium-fast
- Role: Batsman

Domestic team information
- Years: Team
- 1993–1999: Nottinghamshire
- 2000–2002: Derbyshire
- 2003–2004: Lincolnshire
- First-class debut: 21 July 1994 Nottinghamshire v Surrey
- Last First-class: 4 September 2002 Derbyshire v Gloucestershire
- List A debut: 8 August 1993 Nottinghamshire v Yorkshire
- Last List A: 5 May 2004 Lincolnshire v Glamorgan

Career statistics
Competition	FC	List A
Matches	101	142
Runs scored	4648	2637
Batting average	27.83	20.92
100s/50s	9/18	0/10
Top score	149	92
Balls bowled	2658	2335
Wickets	35	66
Bowling average	39.82	28.34
5 wickets in innings	0	0
10 wickets in match	0	n/a
Best bowling	4/28	4/30
Catches/stumpings	56/–	31/–
- Source: CricketArchive (subscription required), 20 May 2012

Mathew Peter Dowman (born 10 May 1974) is a retired English cricketer. Born in Grantham, Dowman was a left-handed batsman and a right-arm medium-fast bowler.

Having started his career at Under-19 level, and including at this stage in his career a top score of 267 for England under-19s against the West Indies in Hove in 1993, at that point a youth "Test" record. A year later he started playing for Nottinghamshire.

Having a successful spell at the team, including a county high score of 149 against Leicestershire, and best bowling figures of 3/10, he continued to play first-class cricket until 2002, including a spell with Derbyshire near the end of his career.

He continued to play Minor Counties cricket for Lincolnshire and built up a steady playing partnership with Paul Pollard during Lincolnshire's Minor Counties Championship win in 2003.
