= Elwood Morris Wherry =

American Presbyterian missionary

Rev. Elwood Morris Wherry (1843–1927) was an American Presbyterian missionary to India where he spent forty years of his life (between 1868 and 1923). He was keenly interested in "Muslim controversy", or apologetics, making contributions to Christian-Muslim relations as an Islamic scholar and Christian ecumenist.

== Biography ==
Wherry was born in South Bend, Armstrong County, Pennsylvania on 26 March 1843. He graduated from Jefferson College in 1862, followed by two years as Principal of Waynesburg Academy in Chester County, Pennsylvania. Two years later he became a member of the Waynesburg Presbyterian Church, the same year that he entered Princeton Theological Seminary. When he graduated in April 1867, he was ordained by the Old School Presbytery of Donegal. On April 8, 1867, Wherry was appointed to be a missionary by the Board of Foreign Missions of the Presbyterian Church in the United States of America, by whom he would be sent to India. Before his journey began, Wherry married Clara Maria Buchanan on July 17, 1867 with whom he had a total of eight children. His first two children would die during his time in India, as there were epidemics of cholera and dysentery during the Wherry's stay. He and his new wife set sail from Boston on October 18, 1867, reaching Kolkata on March 10, 1868. He was stationed at Rawalpindi in the Punjab for the remainder of that year; the following year would see him transferred to Ludhiana.

For 5 years (1883-1888) Wherry taught Old Testament literature and church history as professor at the theological seminary in Saharanpur. His contributions there included translating textbooks into the vernacular, engaging in debates, and giving lectures. In 1888 Wherry resigned from the Mission Press of which he was in charge, and the family returned to the United States for his family's education, as his six children ranged from five to sixteen years of age at this time. He spent from 1889-1896 as the district secretary of the American Tract Society in Chicago. He wouldn't return to India until 1898, where he would remain until 1923, teaching and debating during his village tours. Wherry suffered from diabetes and rheumatic gout, and so retired, returning from his active missionary service to spend the last 4 years of his life in Cincinnati, Ohio. He died of heart failure on October 5, 1927.

== Contributions to Christian-Muslim relations ==
The theology that Wherry developed at Princeton Theological Seminary was one that stressed Biblical authority.

Wherry's textual focus led him to produce a Roman Urdu edition of the Qur'an, intended for use by missionaries. In a paper read at the Semi Centennial Celebration of the American Presbyterian Lodiana Mission in India held in Lodiana from December 3–7, 1884, J.J. Lucas observed "In 1876 Mr. Wherry issued an edition of the Quran in Roman Urdu, which contains ... a very full and complete index in Urdu by Mr. Wherry. ... To the preacher among Muhammadans, this elaborate index is simply invaluable."

Another major contribution that Wherry offered was his production of a commentary of the Qur'an, a four-volume series completed in 1886. Wherry's leadership at the theological seminary in Saharanpur produced pastoral leadership to north Indian churches, whom he exhorted to take part in evangelistic activities. His affinity for "controversy" with Muslims was evident in his tutelage, as his students would often engage in interreligious dialogue in bazaars and village itinerations.

== Works ==
- Zeinab, the Panjabi: A Story Founded on Facts, 1895
- A Comprehensive Commentary on the Qur'an, 1896
- Methods of Mission Work Among Moslems, 1906
- The Moslem World: The Mohammedan World of To-Day, 1907
- The Moslem World: Islam and Christianity in India and the Far East, 1907
- "Islam and Missions", 1911
- The First American Mission to Afghanistan, 1918
- Our Missions in India, 1834–1924
