= William Kendall (cricketer) =

English cricketer (born 1973)

Personal information
- Full name: William Salwey Kendall
- Born: 18 December 1973 (age 52); Wimbledon, Surrey, England
- Batting: Right-handed
- Bowling: Right-arm medium

Domestic team information
- Years: Team
- 1994–1996: Oxford University
- 1996–2004: Hampshire (squad no. 12)

Career statistics
Competition	FC	LA	T20
Matches	140	130	4
Runs scored	6,822	2,113	12
Batting average	33.27	21.78	4.33
100s/50s	10/33	1/7	0/0
Top score	201	110*	12
Balls bowled	1,296	257	0
Wickets	15	5	–
Bowling average	49.06	47.40	–
5 wickets in innings	0	0	–
10 wickets in match	0	0	–
Best bowling	3/37	2/48	–
Catches/stumpings	118/–	59/–	1/–
- Source: Cricinfo, 17 April 2023

William Salwey Kendall (born 18 December 1973) is an English former cricketer who played first-class cricket for Oxford University and Hampshire in a playing career which spanned from 1994 to 2004 as a batsman.

== Early life and varsity cricket ==
Kendall was born in Wimbledon in December 1973. He was educated at Bradfield College, before matriculating to Keble College, Oxford. There, he made his debut in first-class cricket for Oxford University against Durham at Oxford in 1994. He played nine first-class matches during his debut season, recording his maiden century with an unbeaten 113 against Surrey at The Oval. He made a further ten first-class appearances for the university in 1995, scoring 457 runs at an average of 32.64, but did not record a century during the season. He gained his blue during the 1995 season, when he played in The University Match against Cambridge University at Lord's. Prior to the match, he had played for the Combined Universities against the touring West Indians. Kendall made his debut in List A one-day cricket for the Combined Universities in the 1995 Benson & Hedges Cup, playing in three group-stage matches. During the 1996 season, his last at Oxford, he made ten appearances for Oxford and scored an unbeaten 145 runs in The University Match against Cambridge.

== Career with Hampshire ==
Having joined the staff at Hampshire alongside Matthew Keech and Giles White in 1994, Kendall made his debut for Hampshire against Somerset in the 1996 County Championship following his graduation from Oxford. He impressed in his second match against Gloucestershire when he made two scores in forties against a bowling attack led by the West Indian Courtney Walsh, and followed up in his next match against Lancashire with two half centuries. In the final match of the season, he made his first century for Hampshire with an unbeaten 103 runs against Nottinghamshire; combined with his first-class tally playing for Oxford University in the first half of the season, Kendall passed a thousand runs for the season, which he made at an average of exactly 55. The following season, he made twelve first-class appearances, but struggled for form; his 427 runs that season came at an average of only 24.29, with no centuries. He similarly struggled in one-day cricket during the 1997 season, scoring 342 runs from 23 matches at an average of exactly 18.

Having found himself out of the Hampshire side for large parts of the 1998 season, he established himself in the team during the 1999 season. He passed 1,000 runs for the season for the second time in his career, making 1,186 runs at an average of 39.53 from nineteen matches; against Sussex at Hove he made a double-century (201) and was awarded his county cap immediately after his innings. His good form continued into the following match against Northamptonshire, when he was praised for good sportsmanship after walking on 98 runs when an appeal for caught behind from David Sales was given not out by umpire Graham Burgess. His first-class form remained strong in 2000, when he scored 1,156 runs from eighteen matches at an average of 41.28, which resulted in Kendall being named Hampshire Society's Player of the Year. The 2000 season was to also be his most successful in one-day cricket, with 461 runs at an average of 38.41, the one time his one-day batting average would pass 30. Ahead of the 2001 season, he was appointed vice-captain to Robin Smith, a role he would hold for two seasons until it was scrapped by Hampshire coach Paul Terry during the 2002 season.

With Hampshire's move to their new Rose Bowl ground in 2001, Kendall struggled on the pitches there which made batting difficult. His season return in 2001 amounted to 638 runs at an average of 23.62, whilst the following season he scored 705 runs at an average of 24.31. In both the 2001 and 2002 seasons, he deputised for Smith as captain on a number of occasions. He would score his only-day century with an unbeaten 110 against Middlesex in the 2002 Norwich Union League, when he was deputising as captain. He subsequently found himself making fewer appearances for Hampshire over the proceeding two seasons, but did notably captain Hampshire to victory in the absence of Shane Warne in a 2004 County Championship match against Yorkshire at Headingley, making a half century in bowler friendly conditions. Kendall featured in Hampshire's inaugural Twenty20 match against Sussex in the 2003 Twenty20 Cup, and would feature in three further matches in that competition. Kendall was released by Hampshire towards the end of the 2004 season, having lost his place in the side to James Adams and Greg Lamb. In 116 first-class matches for Hampshire, Kendall scored 5,668 runs at an average of 31.66, making seven centuries. In one-day cricket, he made 127 appearances for Hampshire, scoring 2,059 runs at an average of 21.90.

== Personal life ==
Kendall is married to Emily. His daughter Lucia Kendall was born in 2004 and plays football for Southampton. At the age of 14, his daughter was included in the Hampshire women's cricket team ahead of the 2019 season. Away from the professional game, Kendall played club cricket for Esher in the Surrey Championship. He was a capable footballer in his youth, and was offered terms to play professionally for Reading. He also represented Oxford University at hockey, playing in the Varsity match against Cambridge.
