= Pallav Kumar =

Indian cricketer

Pallav Kumar (born 13 July 1981) was an Indian cricketer. He was a right-handed batsman and a right-hand medium-fast bowler who played first-class cricket for Durham during 2004.

Kumar's cricketing career began in the Second XI Championship in 2000, when he turned out for three matches for Leicestershire's Second XI. He spent 2002 out of the game, and joined Cumberland in 2003.

Kumar was part of the Cumberland squad until the end of the 2003 season, before signing to Durham, for whom he played two first-class games before being dropped from the team, despite making an innings of 21 from eleventh in the batting lineup in his final first-class game.

Kumar continued in his role as a tail-ender for the second team through the early part of 2004. He was an occasional, albeit expensive, bowler.
