= David Rooney (cricketer) =

English cricketer

David Rooney (born 16 January 1975) was an English cricketer. He was a right-handed batsman and a right-arm medium-fast bowler who played for Cumberland. He was born in Whitehaven.

Rooney made his cricketing debut in June 2002, in the 38-County Cup.

Rooney made a single List A appearance for the team, during 2003, against Scotland in the Cheltenham & Gloucester Trophy.

As of 2008, Rooney still appears occasionally for Cumberland in the Minor Counties Championship.
