= Richard Ellwood =

English cricketer

Personal information
- Full name: Richard Ellwood
- Born: 6 April 1965 (age 61); Penrith, Cumberland, England
- Batting: Right-handed
- Bowling: Slow left-arm orthodox

Domestic team information
- Years: Team
- 1984–2000: Cumberland

Career statistics
Competition	List A
Matches	4
Runs scored	29
Batting average	29.00
100s/50s	–/–
Top score	24*
Balls bowled	156
Wickets	2
Bowling average	59.00
5 wickets in innings	–
10 wickets in match	–
Best bowling	2/49
Catches/stumpings	–/–
- Source: Cricinfo, 1 April 2011

Richard Ellwood (born 6 April 1965) is a former English cricketer. Ellwood was a right-handed batsman who bowled slow left-arm orthodox. He was born in Penrith, Cumberland.

Ellwood made his debut for Cumberland in the 1984 Minor Counties Championship against Lincolnshire. Ellwood played Minor counties cricket for Cumberland from 1984 to 2000, including 49 Minor Counties Championship matches and 11 MCCA Knockout Trophy matches. In 1989, he made his List A debut against Lancashire in the NatWest Trophy. He played three further List A matches for Cumberland, the last of which came against Worcestershire in the 1995 NatWest Trophy. In his four List A matches, he scored 29 runs at a batting average of 29.00, with a high score of 24*. With the ball he took 2 wickets at a bowling average of 59.00, with best figures of 2/49. His 2 wickets came against Essex in the 1992 NatWest Trophy and were those of Test cricketers Graham Gooch and Mark Waugh.

He also played Second XI cricket for the Leicestershire Second XI, the Lancashire Second XI and the Essex Second XI.
