= Simon Twigg =

English cricketer

Personal information
- Full name: Simon Alexis Twigg
- Born: 8 October 1977 (age 49); Wakefield, Yorkshire, England
- Batting: Right-handed
- Bowling: Right-arm medium

Domestic team information
- Years: Team
- 2003–2005: Cheshire
- 2002: Cumberland

Career statistics
Competition	LA
Matches	4
Runs scored	149
Batting average	37.25
100s/50s	–/2
Top score	68
Balls bowled	–
Wickets	–
Bowling average	–
5 wickets in innings	–
10 wickets in match	–
Best bowling	–
Catches/stumpings	1/–
- Source: Cricinfo, 18 July 2010

Simon Alexis Twigg (born 8 October 1977) is a former English cricketer. Twigg was a right-handed batsman who bowled right-arm medium pace. He was born at Wakefield, Yorkshire.

Twigg made his debut in county cricket for Cumberland against Norfolk in the 2002 Minor Counties Championship. Twigg played one further match for Cumberland in that competition, coming in the same year against Bedfordshire. He also made his debut in List-A cricket for Cumberland, against the Nottinghamshire Cricket Board in the first round of the 2003 Cheltenham & Gloucester Trophy which was played in 2002.

In 2003, he joined Cheshire where he made his debut for the county in the 2003 Minor Counties Championship against Herefordshire. From 2003 to 2005, he represented the county in 12 Minor Counties matches, with his final Minor Counties appearance coming against Devon.

Twigg also represented Cheshire in List-A cricket, representing the county 3 List-A matches, with his final List-A match coming against Hampshire in 2004. In his 4 List-A matches, he scored 149 runs at a batting average of 37.25, with a two half century scores and a high score of 68.
