= Peter Kippax (cricketer) =

English cricketer

Personal information
- Full name: Peter John Kippax
- Born: 15 October 1940; Huddersfield, Yorkshire
- Died: 18 January 2017 (aged 76)
- Batting: Right-handed
- Bowling: Leg-break and googly
- Role: Bowler

Domestic team information
- Years: Team
- 1961–1962: Yorkshire
- 1977: Minor Counties East
- 1977: Northumberland
- 1978–1987: Durham
- FC debut: 26 July 1961 Yorkshire v Sussex
- Last FC: 2 September 1987 MCC v Yorkshire
- LA debut: 30 April 1977 Minor Counties East v Middlesex
- Last LA: 24 June 1987 Durham v Middlesex

Career statistics
Competition	First-class	List A
Matches	5	13
Runs scored	40	187
Batting average	6.66	17.00
100s/50s	0/0	0/0
Top score	9	42
Balls bowled	822	726
Wickets	12	20
Bowling average	33.00	19.35
5 wickets in innings	1	0
10 wickets in match	0	0
Best bowling	5/54	3/24
Catches/stumpings	1/0	1/–
- Source: CricketArchive, 19 January 2017

Peter John Kippax (15 October 1940 – January 2017) was an English first-class cricketer who played for Yorkshire, Durham and Northumberland. A right-handed batsman and leg spin bowler, he played five first-class matches but they spanned twenty six years.

== Life ==
Kippax was born in Huddersfield, educated at Bedford Modern School, and made his debut in 1961 for Yorkshire, and yet played his last first-class match, for the Marylebone Cricket Club (MCC), in 1987.

Kippax played three times in his debut season of 1961, against Sussex, Leicestershire and Kent and once in 1962 against the touring Pakistani team. The Yorkshire team, about to begin their domination of the County Championship during the 1960s were well served with spinners such as Ray Illingworth and Don Wilson, and had little room for Kippax's leg spinners.

After his rejection by Yorkshire he turned his attention to the leagues and, from 1975 to 1990, Minor Counties cricket with Durham. Twenty-five years after his last Yorkshire appearance he turned out for the MCC against the Tykes at North Marine Road Ground, Scarborough in September 1987, taking the wickets of centurians Ashley Metcalfe and Ian Swallow, as well as Peter Hartley and Phil Robinson for a duck.

In his eight first-class innings he scored 40 runs, with a highest score of 9 for an average of 6.66, and took 12 wickets at 33.00 with a best return of 5 for 74. In 13 one day matches for Durham and Northumberland, he averaged 17.00 with the bat, scoring 187 runs with a best of 42, and took 20 wickets at 19.35 with a best of 3 for 24.

He ran his own bat making business for almost thirty years, Peter Kippax Sports and then Kippax Willow, with his English willow bats being used by many Yorkshire county and league players. Kippax died from Alzheimer's disease in January 2017 aged 76.
