= David Pearson (cricketer) =

English cricketer (born 1963)

Personal information
- Full name: David John Pearson
- Born: 16 April 1963 (age 63); Whalley, Lancashire, England
- Nickname: DP
- Batting: Left-handed
- Role: Wicket-keeper

Domestic team information
- Years: Team
- 1990–2000: Cumberland

Career statistics
Competition	List A
Matches	10
Runs scored	136
Batting average	13.60
100s/50s	0/0
Top score	30
Catches/stumpings	4/–
- Source: Cricinfo, 1 April 2011

David John Pearson (born 16 April 1963) is an English former cricketer. Pearson was a left-handed batsman who fielded as a wicket-keeper. He was born in Whalley, Lancashire.

Pearson made his debut for Cumberland in the 1990 Minor Counties Championship against Bedfordshire. He played minor counties cricket for Cumberland from 1990 to 2000, including 74 matches in the Minor Counties Championship, and 21 MCCA Knockout Trophy matches. He made his List A debut in 1994 against Leicestershire in the NatWest Trophy.

Pearson played nine further List A Matches for Cumberland, the last of which came against Kent in the 2000 NatWest Trophy. In his ten List A Matches, he scored 136 runs at an average of 13.60 with a high score of 30. In the field, he took four catches.

Pearson also played second-XI cricket for the Lancashire Second XI and the Leicestershire Second XI. He officially retired from club cricket in 1998.

Pearson's son, Lewis, won selection for the Lancashire County Cricket Club under-11 side in June 2011. Pearson remarked he was "truly proud" that his son was following in his footsteps.
