= John Elleray =

English cricketer (born 1946)

Personal information
- Full name: John Bernard Elleray
- Born: 13 April 1946 (age 80); Windermere, Westmorland, England
- Batting: Right-handed
- Bowling: Right-arm medium-fast

Domestic team information
- Years: Team
- 1979–1986: Cumberland

Career statistics
Competition	List A
Matches	2
Runs scored	8
Batting average	8.00
100s/50s	–/–
Top score	8
Balls bowled	102
Wickets	–
Bowling average	–
5 wickets in innings	–
10 wickets in match	–
Best bowling	–
Catches/stumpings	1/–
- Source: Cricinfo, 31 March 2011

John Bernard Elleray (born 13 May 1946) is a former English cricketer. Lupton was a right-handed batsman who bowled right-arm medium-fast. He was born in Windermere, Westmorland.

Elleray made his debut for Cumberland in the 1979 Minor Counties Championship against Durham. Elleray played Minor counties cricket for Cumberland from 1979 to 1986, including eleven Minor Counties Championship matches and two MCCA Knockout Trophy matches. In 1985, he made his List A debut against Derbyshire in the NatWest Trophy. The following season he played his second and final List A match for Cumberland against Lancashire in the 1986 NatWest Trophy. In his two matches he scored 8 runs and bowled 17 wicket-less overs which cost 63 runs.
