= Anthony O'Connor (cricketer) =

English cricketer

Personal information
- Full name: Anthony Philip O'Connor
- Born: 24 June 1980 (age 46); Bradford, Yorkshire, England
- Batting: Left-handed
- Bowling: Left-arm medium

Domestic team information
- Years: Team
- 1999–2010: Shropshire

Career statistics
Competition	List A
Matches	6
Runs scored	8
Batting average	4.00
100s/50s	–/–
Top score	7*
Balls bowled	251
Wickets	5
Bowling average	39.20
5 wickets in innings	–
10 wickets in match	–
Best bowling	2/27
Catches/stumpings	1/–
- Source: Cricinfo, 2 July 2011

Anthony Philip O'Connor (born 24 June 1980) is an English former cricketer. O'Connor was a left-handed batsman who bowled left-arm medium pace. He was born in Bradford, Yorkshire.

O'Connor made his debut for Shropshire in the 1999 Minor Counties Championship against Cheshire. O'Connor played Minor counties cricket for Shropshire from 1999 to 2010, which included 36 Minor Counties Championship appearances and 19 MCCA Knockout Trophy appearances. He made his List A debut against Devon in the 2001 Cheltenham & Gloucester Trophy. He made 5 further List A appearances, the last of which came against Hampshire in the 2005 Cheltenham & Gloucester Trophy. In his 6 List A matches, he took 5 wickets at an average of 39.20, with best figures of 2/27.
