= 2000 English cricket season =

Cricket season review

The 2000 cricket season was the 101st in which the County Championship has been an official competition. Surrey in first-class cricket and Gloucestershire in limited overs cricket were the dominant teams. The West Indies toured England to compete in a test series which England won 3–1. Zimbabwe also played their first test series on English soil losing 1–0.

== Honours ==
- County Championship - Surrey
- NatWest Trophy - Gloucestershire
- National League - Gloucestershire
- Benson & Hedges Cup - Gloucestershire
- Minor Counties Championship - Dorset
- MCCA Knockout Trophy - Herefordshire
- Second XI Championship - Middlesex II
- Wisden - Mark Alleyne, Martin Bicknell, Andy Caddick, Justin Langer, Darren Lehmann

== Test series ==
England played five Test matches against West Indies following two against Zimbabwe.

== Leading batsmen ==
Michael Bevan topped the averages with 1124 runs @ 74.93

The top runscorer was Darren Lehmann with 1477 @ 67.13

== Leading bowlers ==
Courtney Walsh topped the averages with 40 wickets @ 11.42

The leading wicket taker was Glenn McGrath, playing for Worcestershire, who took 80 @ 13.21

== Annual reviews ==
- Playfair Cricket Annual 2001
- Wisden Cricketers' Almanack 2001
