= The Maer Ground =

Cricket ground in Devon, England

Coordinates: 50°36′48″N 3°24′21″W

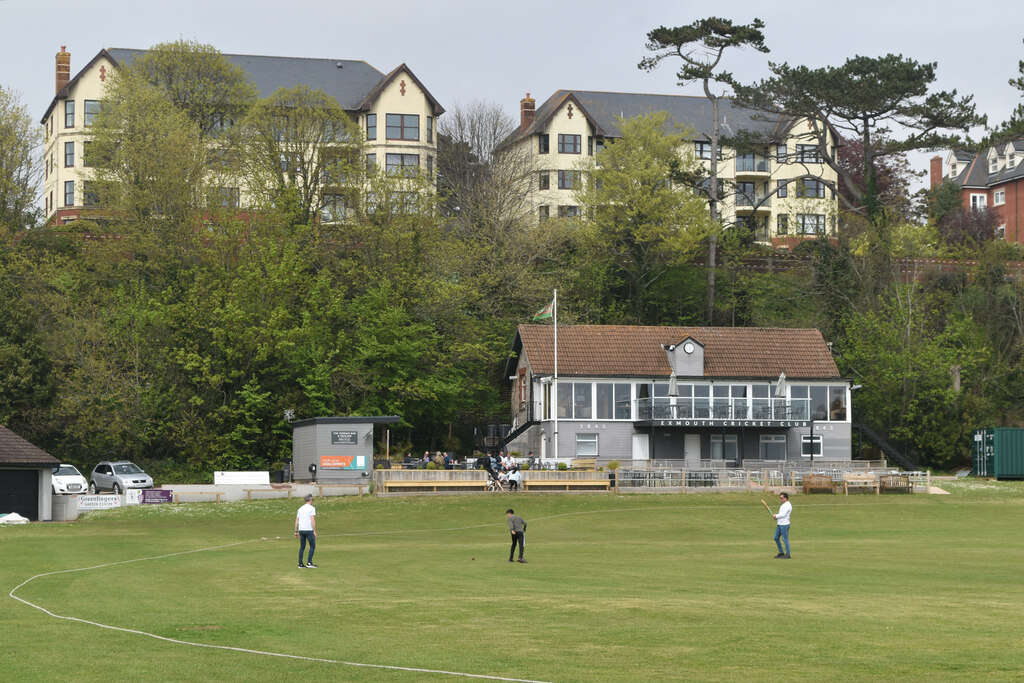

Ground information
- Location: Exmouth, Devon
- Country: England
- Home club: Exmouth
- County club: Devon
- Establishment: 1874

International information
- Only WODI: 14 July 1973: England v New Zealand

Team information
Devon	(1874–present)
- As of 6 September 2030; Source: Ground profile

The Maer Ground is a cricket ground in Exmouth, Devon. It is the home ground of Exmouth Cricket Club and is also used regularly by Devon County Cricket Club.

The first recorded match played on the ground was in 1874 when Devon played Will-o'-the-Wisp. From 1883 to 1889 the ground played host to eight matches between Devon and the Marylebone Cricket Club. In 1951, the Maer hosted Devon's first Minor Counties Championship match against Berkshire, and has since played host to 49 Minor Counties Championship matches. The ground played host to a Women's One Day International between England and New Zealand in the 1973 Women's World Cup. In 1986, it hosted its first List A match in the 1986 NatWest Trophy between Devon and Nottinghamshire, which Devon lost by 59 runs. The Maer has hosted 16 List A matches, the last of which came in the 2005 Cheltenham & Gloucester Trophy when Devon hosted Essex. In 2004 the ground played host to one of the biggest upsets in county cricket history when Devon defeated Leicestershire by losing fewer wickets in tying with Leicestershire's score of 156. In 2008, the ground played host to the touring Kenya, who defeated Devon by ten runs in a one-day match.
