= Lawrence Prittipaul =

English cricketer

Personal information
- Full name: Lawrence Roland Prittipaul
- Born: 19 October 1979 (age 47); Portsmouth, Hampshire, England
- Batting: Right-handed
- Bowling: Right-arm medium
- Relatives: Shivnarine Chanderpaul (cousin)

Domestic team information
- Years: Team
- 1998–1999: Hampshire Cricket Board
- 1999–2005: Hampshire (squad no. 10)

Career statistics
Competition	FC	LA	T20
Matches	23	62	13
Runs scored	975	564	84
Batting average	28.67	13.11	10.50
100s/50s	1/4	0/1	0/0
Top score	152	67	35
Balls bowled	759	1,000	83
Wickets	9	23	2
Bowling average	49.22	38.69	54.50
5 wickets in innings	0	0	0
10 wickets in match	0	0	0
Best bowling	3/17	3/11	2/17
Catches/stumpings	18/–	18/–	5/–
- Source: Cricinfo, 12 August 2009

Lawrence Roland Prittipaul (born 19 October 1979) is an English former cricketer who played county cricket for Hampshire County Cricket Club between 1999 and 2005.

== Life and cricket career ==
Prittipaul was born at Portsmouth in October 1979 to Indo-Guyanese parents. His cousin is the former West Indian batsman Shivnarine Chanderpaul. He was educated in Portsmouth at St John's College. Prittipaul first played representative cricket for the Hampshire Cricket Board (HCB) (Note: The Hampshire Cricket Board (HCB), formed in 1996, is the governing body for recreational cricket in the county of Hampshire. It entered a largely amateur team in the minor counties one-day Knockout Trophy between 1998 and 2002, and took part alongside the first-class and minor counties, and other cricket boards, in the List A domestic one-day competition between 1999 and 2003. The HCB is a separate entity to Hampshire County Cricket Club, which was formed in 1863, and is the professional representative team for the county of Hampshire.) in the MCCA Knockout Trophy in 1998 and 1999, with his List A one-day debut coming for the HCB against Suffolk at Bury St Edmunds in the 1999 NatWest Trophy. Later in the 1999 season, Prittipaul made his senior debut for Hampshire against Worcestershire in the CGU National League. The following season, made his debut in first-class cricket for Hampshire against Kent at Canterbury in the County Championship, with him top-scoring in Hampshire's first innings with 52. Two games later he recorded what would be his only first-class century, making 152 against Derbyshire, which was the last first-class century to be scored at the County Ground prior to its closure at the end of the 2000 season. He also scored the last one-day half century at the ground against Nottinghamshire, in what was Hampshire's final match at the ground.

He scored the first century at the Rose Bowl in a Second Eleven match against Glamorgan in June 2000, though the match carried no status. Like his teammates, Prittipaul struggled to adjust to the new pitches at the Rose Bowl in their early years. As his first-class opportunities became less, Prittipaul was predominantly used by Hampshire in one-day cricket. He made his Twenty20 debut at the Rose Bowl against Essex in the 2003 Twenty20 Cup. By 2005, he was considered a bit part player in the Hampshire team. Nonetheless, he formed an important match-winning partnership with Nic Pothas in a 2005 Twenty20 Cup fixture against Kent, scoring 35 runs off 24 balls in a partnership worth 72 runs for the fifth wicket. He retired from the professional game in 2005, having made 23 first-class, 62 List A, and 13 Twenty20 appearances. In first-class cricket, he scored 975 runs at an average of 28.67, In his 62 one-day matches, 59 of which came for Hampshire, he scored 564 runs with one half century. His 13 Twenty20 matches saw him score 84 runs. Prittipaul had limited returns with his medium pace bowling across all formats.

Following his retirement, he played club cricket for various teams in the Southern Premier Cricket League, and later co-founded Cage Cricket, which was launched in 2011 with the support of Ian Botham. It was exhibited to the Royal Dutch Cricket Association (KNCB) in 2012, who launched the concept in Nijmegen.
