= 2000–01 Canberra Cosmos FC season =

Canberra Cosmos
2000–01 season
- Manager: Tom Sermanni; Milos Milovanovic
- National Soccer League: 11th
- Top goalscorer: Alex Castro (10)
- Highest home attendance: 4,660 vs. Perth Glory (29 April 2001); National Soccer League
- Lowest home attendance: 1,534 vs. Football Kingz (30 December 2000); National Soccer League
- Average home league attendance: 2,183
- Biggest win: 7–1 vs. Eastern Pride (7 April 2001); National Soccer League
- Biggest defeat: 0–6 vs. Adelaide Force (25 April 2001); National Soccer League

The 2000–01 season was the sixth and final season in the history of Canberra Cosmos. It was also the sixth and final season in the National Soccer League.

== Players ==
Note: Flags indicate national team as defined under FIFA eligibility rules; some limited exceptions apply. Players may hold more than one non-FIFA nationality.

No.	Pos.	Nation	Player
1	GK	AUS	Angelo Konstantinou
2	MF	AUS	Barry Guildford
3	DF	AUS	Toplica Popovich
4	MF	AUS	Andrew Ravanello
5	DF	AUS	Nick Purdue
6	MF	JPN	Naoki Imaya
7	FW	AUS	Mark Hagger
8	FW	AUS	David Milin
9	MF	AUS	Alex Castro
10	FW	AUS	Jon Angelucci
11	MF	AUS	David Arranz
12	MF	URU	Milton Cortes
13	MF	AUS	Shane Lyons

No.	Pos.	Nation	Player
14	MF	AUS	Andy Rakic
15	MF	ENG	Marcus Phillips
16	MF	AUS	Ilija Prenzoski
17	DF	AUS	Robert Hooker (Captain)
18	FW	NZL	Brad Scott
19	DF	JPN	Hiroshi Miyazawa
20	GK	AUS	Barney Smith
23	FW	AUS	Dom La Butie
—	MF	AUS	Daniel Aliffi
—	DF	AUS	Con Anthopoulos
—	FW	AUS	Paul Ivanic
—	MF	AUS	Stephen Kemp

== Competitions ==
=== Overview ===
Competition	First match	Last match	Starting round	Final position	Record							
Competition	First match	Last match	Starting round	Final position	Pld	W	D	L	GF	GA	GD	Win %
National Soccer League	14 October 2000	29 April 2001	Matchday 1	11th	30	11	4	15	49	55	−6	36.67
Total					30	11	4	15	49	55	−6	36.67

Source: Competitions

=== National Soccer League ===
==== League table ====
Pos	Team	Pld	W	D	L	GF	GA	GD	Pts
9	Parramatta Power	30	13	3	14	42	44	−2	42
10	Sydney United	30	12	6	12	46	56	−10	42
11	Canberra Cosmos	30	11	4	15	49	55	−6	37
12	Brisbane Strikers	30	9	8	13	52	56	−4	35
13	Northern Spirit	30	8	8	14	39	50	−11	32

Source: rsssf.com
Rules for classification: 1) Points; 2) Goal difference; 3) Goals scored

==== Results by round ====
Round	1	2	3	4	5	6	7	8	9	10	11	12	13	14	15	16	17	18	19	20	21	22	23	24	25	26	27	28	29	30
Ground	H	A	H	A	A	A	A	H	A	H	A	H	A	H	A	A	H	A	H	H	H	H	A	H	A	H	A	H	A	H
Result	W	L	W	D	W	L	W	L	D	L	L	L	W	D	L	W	L	L	D	L	W	W	L	L	L	W	W	W	L	L
Position	1	7	4	4	5	6	5	7	7	9	10	11	10	10	11	10	11	11	11	12	11	10	12	13	13	11	10	10	11	11

Source: worldfootball.net
A = Away; H = Home; W = Win; D = Draw; L = Loss

==== Matches ====
14 October 2000 1	Canberra Cosmos	3–0 (Note: Awarded score. Original score 1–2 to Carlton; result was changed after Carlton abandoned the 2000–01 National Soccer League season after eight rounds.)	Carlton	Canberra
	Phillips 70'	Report	Thompson 14', 47'	Stadium: Bruce Stadium; Attendance: 1,870; Referee: J. Blaney

21 October 2000 2	Marconi Fairfield	1–0	Canberra Cosmos	Sydney
	Costanzo 51'	Report		Stadium: Marconi Stadium; Attendance: 4,083; Referee: B. Hugo

28 October 2000 3	Canberra Cosmos	3–0	Melbourne Knights	Canberra
	Hagger 52'; Scott 63'; Castro	Report		Stadium: Bruce Stadium; Attendance: 1,550; Referee: Peter Green

4 November 2000 4	Brisbane Strikers	2–2	Canberra Cosmos	Brisbane
	Foster 45'; Dwyer 85'	Report	Hagger 89'; Angelucci 90'	Stadium: Suncorp Stadium; Attendance: 2,546; Referee: J. Blaney

11 November 2000 5	Parramatta Power	2–3	Canberra Cosmos	Sydney
	Griffiths 30', 60'	Report	Phillips 50' (pen.); Angelucci 64'; Castro 90'	Stadium: Parramatta Stadium; Attendance: 3,257; Referee: D. Rugg

17 November 2000 6	Newcastle United	2–1	Canberra Cosmos	Newcastle
	Dodd 24'; Surjan 34' (pen.)	Report	Angelucci 60' (pen.)	Stadium: Marathon Stadium; Attendance: 6,580; Referee: M. Breeze

24 November 2000 7	Wollongong Wolves	2–3	Canberra Cosmos	Wollongong
	Huxley 16'; Petrovski 86'	Report	Castro 46'; Angelucci 64', 66'	Stadium: WIN Stadium; Attendance: 3,876; Referee: C. Diomis

2 December 2000 8	Canberra Cosmos	1–3	South Melbourne	Canberra
	Scott 63'	Report	Coveny 17'; Trimboli 70'; Lozanovski 89'	Stadium: Bruce Stadium; Attendance: 2,619; Referee: P. Mur

10 December 2000 9	Sydney United	2–2	Canberra Cosmos	Sydney
	Deur 66'; Menapi 90+3'	Report	Castro 5'; Popovich 90+4'	Stadium: Sydney United Sports Centre; Attendance: 3,254; Referee: Simon Micallef

16 December 2000 10	Canberra Cosmos	2–3	Sydney Olympic	Canberra
	Imaya 43', 46'	Report	Owens 35'; Parisi 66', 70'	Stadium: Bruce Stadium; Attendance: 2,011; Referee: J. Blaney

23 December 2000 11	Eastern Pride	3–1	Canberra Cosmos	Morwell
	Roach 35', 44'; Griffiths 70'	Report	Castro 89'	Stadium: Mobil Park; Attendance: 1,680; Referee: C. Diomis

30 December 2000 12	Canberra Cosmos	0–2	Football Kingz	Canberra
		Report	Ibrahim 33'; Vicelich 73'	Stadium: Bruce Stadium; Attendance: 1,534; Referee: C. Zetter

6 January 2001 13	Northern Spirit	0–2	Canberra Cosmos	Gosford
		Report	Angelucci 23'; Hagger 89'	Stadium: Central Coast Stadium; Attendance: 3,688; Referee: A. Nardi

13 January 2001 14	Canberra Cosmos	1–1	Adelaide Force	Canberra
	Hagger 75'	Report	Pelosi 59'	Stadium: Bruce Stadium; Attendance: 1,804; Referee: Peter Green

20 January 2001 15	Perth Glory	3–0	Canberra Cosmos	Perth
	Mori 14'; Despotovski 32'; Farina 48'	Report		Stadium: Perth Oval; Attendance: 13,277; Referee: A. Nardi

16	Canberra Cosmos	3–0 (Note: Awarded score. Match was not played and was automatically awarded 3–0 to Canberra Cosmos; result was given after Carlton abandoned the 2000–01 National Soccer League season after eight rounds.)	Carlton

3 February 2001 17	Canberra Cosmos	1–2	Marconi Fairfield	Canberra
	Imaya 57'	Report	Brownlie 34'; Trajanovski 40'	Stadium: Bruce Stadium; Attendance: 1,822; Referee: Mark Shield

11 February 2001 18	Melbourne Knights	2–0	Canberra Cosmos	Melbourne
	Da Costa 16'; Porter 65'	Report		Stadium: Knights Stadium; Attendance: 4,098; Referee: E. Lennie

17 February 2001 19	Canberra Cosmos	1–1	Brisbane Strikers	Wollongong
	Castro 50'	Report	Dwyer 88'	Stadium: WIN Stadium; Attendance: 1,893; Referee: P. Mur

24 February 2001 20	Canberra Cosmos	0–1	Parramatta Power	Canberra
		Report	Roodenburg 77'	Stadium: Bruce Stadium; Attendance: 2,012; Referee: G. Connolly

3 March 2001 21	Canberra Cosmos	3–2	Newcastle United	Canberra
	Castro 24'; Kemp 32'; Hagger 55'	Report	Harper 79'; McBreen 88'	Stadium: Bruce Stadium; Attendance: 1,573; Referee: C. Diomis

10 March 2001 22	Canberra Cosmos	2–1	Wollongong Wolves	Canberra
	Cortes 82'; Angelucci 84'	Report	Young 44'	Stadium: Bruce Stadium; Attendance: 2,593; Referee: A. Nardi

18 March 2001 23	South Melbourne	1–0	Canberra Cosmos	Melbourne
	Boutsianis 79'	Report		Stadium: Bob Jane Stadium; Attendance: 5,028; Referee: E. Lennie

23 March 2001 24	Canberra Cosmos	1–2	Sydney United	Canberra
	Cortes 71'	Report	Menapi 5'; Awaritefe 51'	Stadium: Bruce Stadium; Attendance: 2,763; Referee: Peter Green

1 April 2001 25	Sydney Olympic	3–1	Canberra Cosmos	Sydney
	Juric 54'; Cardozo 72' (pen.); Wilson 86'	Report	Castro 40'	Stadium: Belmore Sports Ground; Attendance: 4,428; Referee: Mark Shield

7 April 2001 26	Canberra Cosmos	7–1	Eastern Pride	Canberra
	Cortes 17', 55', 73', 90'; Anthopoulos 31'; Ivanic 63', 79'	Report	Trebbia 89'	Stadium: Bruce Stadium; Attendance: 1,996; Referee: N. Fox

13 April 2001 27	Football Kingz	2–3	Canberra Cosmos	Auckland
	Rufer 33'; Perry 45'	Report	Ivanic 9'; Aliffi 22'; Anthopoulos 85'	Stadium: Ericsson Stadium; Attendance: 6,941; Referee: C. Zetter

21 April 2001 28	Canberra Cosmos	3–2	Northern Spirit	Canberra
	Castro 1', 85'; Cortes 89' (pen.)	Report	Burgess 31'; Foster 70'	Stadium: Bruce Stadium; Attendance: 2,054; Referee: G. Connolly

25 April 2001 29	Adelaide Force	6–0	Canberra Cosmos	Adelaide
	Pelosi 14', 66'; Pantelis 23'; Terminello 79', 84'; Brain 90+1'	Report		Stadium: Hindmarsh Stadium; Attendance: 2,623; Referee: B. Hugo

29 April 2001 30	Canberra Cosmos	0–3	Perth Glory	Canberra
		Report	Miller 19'; Maloney 21'; Edwards 54'	Stadium: Bruce Stadium; Attendance: 4,660; Referee: C. Diomis

== Statistics ==
=== Appearances and goals ===
Players with no appearances not included in the list.

No.	Pos.	Nat.	Name	National Soccer League		Total	
No.	Pos.	Nat.	Name	Apps	Goals	Apps	Goals
1	GK	(Australia)	Angelo Konstantinou	12	0	12	0
3	DF	(Australia)	Toplica Popovich	19(5)	1	24	1
4	MF	(Australia)	Andrew Ravanello	16(5)	0	21	0
5	DF	(Australia)	Nick Purdue	21(4)	0	25	0
6	MF	(Japan)	Naoki Imaya	10(10)	3	20	3
7	FW	(Australia)	Mark Hagger	10(12)	5	22	5
8	FW	(Australia)	David Milin	12(1)	0	13	0
9	MF	(Australia)	Alex Castro	26	10	26	10
10	FW	(Australia)	Jon Angelucci	24(1)	7	25	7
11	MF	(Australia)	David Arranz	25(1)	0	26	0
12	MF	(Uruguay)	Milton Cortes	11(7)	7	18	7
13	MF	(Australia)	Shane Lyons	15(7)	0	22	0
14	MF	(Australia)	Andy Rakic	3(6)	0	9	0
15	MF	(England)	Marcus Phillips	7(1)	2	8	2
16	MF	(Australia)	Ilija Prenzoski	4(4)	0	8	0
17	DF	(Australia)	Robert Hooker	23(2)	0	25	0
18	FW	(New Zealand)	Brad Scott	10(8)	2	18	2
19	DF	(Japan)	Hiroshi Miyazawa	24	0	24	0
20	GK	(Australia)	Barney Smith	11	0	11	0
23	FW	(Australia)	Dom La Butie	0(1)	0	1	0
—	MF	(Australia)	Daniel Aliffi	6(1)	1	7	1
—	DF	(Australia)	Con Anthopoulos	16	2	16	2
—	FW	(Australia)	Paul Ivanic	1(3)	3	4	3
—	MF	(Australia)	Stephen Kemp	7(1)	1	8	1

=== Clean sheets ===
Rank	No.	Pos	Nat	Name	National Soccer League	Total
1	1	GK	(Australia)	Angelo Konstantinou	1	1
1	20	GK	(Australia)	Barney Smith	1	1
Total					2	2
