= Brad Scott =

Brad Scott or Bradley Scott may refer to:

- Brad Scott (American football) (born 1954), former American football head coach of the South Carolina Gamecocks
- Brad Scott (runner) (born 1988), Australian Paralympic Games competitor in athletics
- Brad Scott (New Zealand footballer) (born 1977), New Zealand soccer player
- Brad Scott (Australian footballer) (born 1976), coach of the Essendon Football Club, former coach of the North Melbourne Football Club and former Australian rules footballer with Brisbane Lions
- Brad Scott (fighter) (born 1989), English mixed martial artist
- Bradley Scott (cricketer) (born 1979), New Zealand bowler
