= Paul S. Cederna =

American plastic surgeon

- Education: University of Michigan Medical School
- Medical career
- Institutions: Michigan Medicine

Paul S. Cederna is an American plastic surgeon who is Robert Oneal Professor of Plastic Surgery, Chief of the Section of Plastic Surgery, and Professor in the Department of Biomedical Engineering at the University of Michigan.

== Education ==
He earned his BSc in Biomedical Engineering from the University of Michigan College of Engineering and medical degree from the University of Michigan Medical School. He went to the University of Iowa Hospitals and Clinics for his residency in General Surgery and a fellowship in Microsurgery before returning to Michigan for a Plastic Surgery Fellowship. He subsequently completed two years of basic science research training as a post doctoral research fellow at the Muscle Mechanics Lab.

== Career ==
He leads the Neuromuscular Lab at the University of Michigan, along with Stephen Kemp and Theodore A. Kung, uniting biotechnology and surgical science.

== Research ==
Cederna specializes in reconstruction of complex wounds. He has also led projects developing robotic prosthetics that use signals from the brain through nerve interfaces for amputees, which was supported by the National Institutes of Health.

== Honors and awards ==
Paul Cederna has been elected as the President of the American Association of Plastic Surgeons, President of the Plastic Surgery Foundation, President of the American Society for Peripheral Nerve, Chairman of the American Board of Plastic Surgeons, Chairman of the Plastic Surgery Research Council, and Vice-Chair of the ACGME Plastic Surgery Residency Review Committee. He has served as Chief of the Section of Plastic Surgery from 2012-2025. He has been named to the Top Docs list multiple times.
