= Anthony Seibold =

Australian rugby league footballer and coach (born 1974)

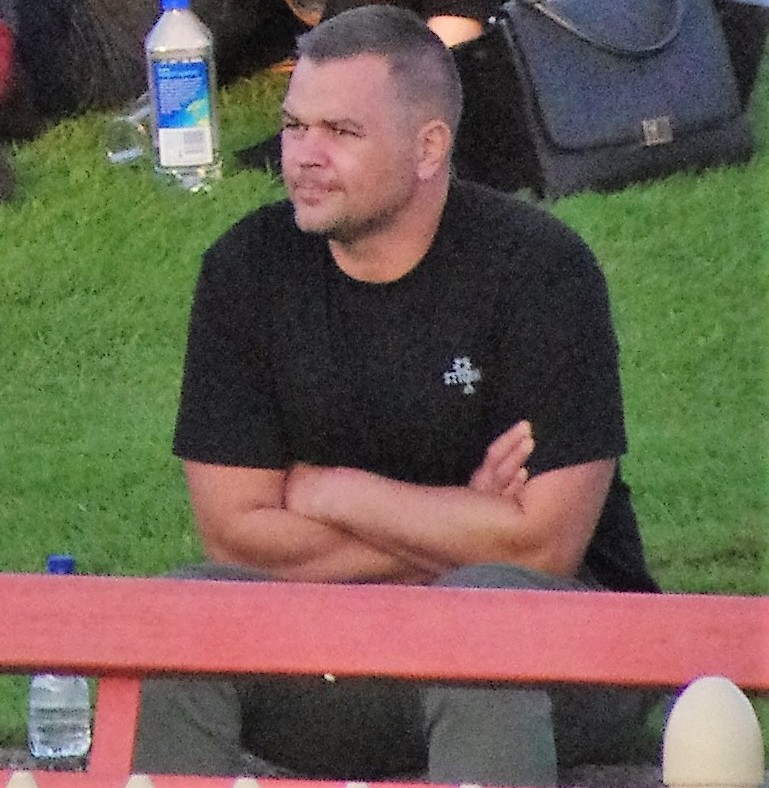

Personal information
- Full name: Anthony Chris Francis Seibold
- Born: 3 October 1974 (age 52) Rockhampton, Queensland, Australia

Playing information
- Position: Prop, Second-row
Club
Years	Team	Pld	T	G	FG	P
1996	Saint-Esteve
1997–98	Canberra Raiders	14	0	0	0	0
1999–00	London Broncos	55	5	0	0	20
2003–04	Hull Kingston Rovers	53	9	0	0	36
2005	Toowoomba Clydesdales
2006	Celtic Crusaders	12	4	0	0	16
	Total	134	18	0	0	72

Coaching information
Club
Years	Team	Gms	W	D	L	W%
2010	South Wales Scorpions	21	9	0	12	43
2018	South Sydney	27	17	0	10	63
2019–20	Brisbane Broncos	38	14	1	23	37
2023–26	Manly Sea Eagles	77	37	2	38	48
	Total	163	77	3	83	47
- Source: As of 28 May 2026

Anthony Seibold (/siːboʊld/) (born 3 October 1974) is an Australian professional rugby league coach who last coached the Manly Warringah Sea Eagles in the National Rugby League and a former professional rugby league footballer.

Seibold played rugby league as a forward for A S Saint-Estève, Canberra Raiders, London Broncos and Hull Kingston Rovers.

After retiring, he moved into coaching, and was head coach of the South Sydney Rabbitohs in the 2018 NRL season, and of the Brisbane Broncos from 2019 to 2020. He moved to rugby union as an assistant coach for England in September 2021, before returning to rugby league as head coach of the Manly Warringah Sea Eagles in November 2022.

== Background ==
Anthony Seibold was born in Rockhampton, Queensland, Australia, and is of German descent from his grandfather, and predominantly Irish and English from his paternal grandmother's side.

== Playing career ==
=== Canberra Raiders ===
As a player, Seibold had stints in the lower grades at the Brisbane Broncos (1992–1995) and in the National Rugby League with the Canberra Raiders (1997–1998).

=== London Broncos ===
In 1999 Seibold signed for the London Broncos where he played two seasons in the Super League. While playing for the London Broncos, then owned by Richard Branson, Seibold and several teammates made a promotional appearance at the 2000 Brit Awards. They performed on stage, playing drums for a joint performance of "We Will Rock You" by the rock band Queen and the pop group Five.

=== Ipswich Jets ===
Seibold played for the Ipswich Jets in the 2002 Queensland Cup Grand Final before returning to the UK.

=== Hull KR ===
In 2003, Seibold signed for Hull Kingston Rovers, where he captained the team during their 2003 and 2004 seasons having his best season during his career with the team from East Hull.

=== Toowoomba Clydesdales ===
He returned to the Brisbane Broncos organisation in 2005 where he captained the Toowoomba Clydesdales team in the 2005 Queensland Cup.

== Coaching career ==
Seibold has a Bachelor of Teaching and a Masters of Education and lectured in the Faculty of Education at the University of Southern Queensland after his retirement from playing. In 2006, he moved to Wales where he was assistant coach at Celtic Crusaders between 2006 and 2009, playing in the first season. He helped to lead the club to Super League and assisted John Dixon in their first season at that level.

=== South Wales Scorpions ===
Following his spell at Crusaders, in 2009 he took on his first head coach role, at South Wales Scorpions where he led the club to the play-offs in the club's first ever season. He then moved back to Australia to coach in the Queensland Cup at the end of 2010.

=== Manly Warringah Sea Eagles ===
After working as an assistant coach at the Melbourne Storm under Craig Bellamy, Seibold was recruited to join the Manly Sea Eagles. He was also an assistant coach of the Queensland Maroons State of Origin team. On 8 November 2022, Seibold was appointed coach of the Manly Sea Eagles following the sacking of their former coach Des Hasler.

=== South Sydney Rabbitohs ===
On 6 October 2017, Seibold was announced as the new South Sydney Rabbitohs coach.

In his first year as Souths coach, Seibold guided the club to a third-placed finish at the end of the regular season. Souths went on to reach the preliminary final but fell short of a grand final appearance losing 12–4 to Sydney Roosters. On 27 September 2018, Seibold was named Dally M coach of the year.

In November 2018, Seibold angrily spoke to the media about a possible switch with Brisbane coach Wayne Bennett. He went on to say "I have had a gutful. I’ve been sitting here for four weeks and feeling like a punching bag. It’s not acceptable and it’s not fair … He’s (Wayne Bennett) been ringing up the Souths boys but then tells his press conference he hasn’t spoken to anyone. That’s absolute bullshit … I’m sick of Wayne carrying on.

=== Brisbane Broncos ===
On 2 December 2018, Seibold was announced as the new Brisbane Broncos coach from 2019 onwards, a year earlier than expected, after Wayne Bennett was sacked as coach.

The 2019 season started off badly for Seibold and Brisbane as the club endured their equal worst start to a season since the club entered the competition in 1988. This included a 4–36 loss against the Sydney Roosters at the Sydney Cricket Ground. Between rounds 16 and 24, Brisbane only lost 2 out of 8 games and qualified for the finals with a 17–16 victory over the Parramatta Eels at Suncorp Stadium.

In the 2019 elimination final against Parramatta, Brisbane suffered their worst ever defeat (at the time) and were also handed the biggest loss in finals history losing 58–0 at the new Western Sydney Stadium. In the post match press conference, Seibold said "I’m really disappointed, I’m embarrassed. I can’t toss up any excuses for that. I’ll wear it, I’m the coach of the club so I’ll take responsibility but it’s also my job to fix that. "I got a whiff of it last week leading into the Bulldogs game. Maybe I was too optimistic. It was men against boys today, it was embarrassing".

Brisbane started the 2020 NRL season with two wins in a row against North Queensland and Seibold's former team, South Sydney. Brisbane maintained 5th position during the two rounds of the season before its suspension due to the outbreak of COVID-19 in Australia. Upon the resumption of the season on 28 May, Brisbane were defeated 34–6 by the Parramatta Eels. The following week, Brisbane were again on the wrong end of a big score line, losing to the Sydney Roosters 59–0. This broke the record for the largest defeat in Broncos history. Brisbane went on to lose four more matches in a row, before defeating the Canterbury-Bankstown Bulldogs 26–8 in Round 9, snapping the Broncos' six game losing streak and giving them their third and final win for the 2020 season. Brisbane lost the next four matches against the Wests Tigers, Melbourne, Cronulla-Sutherland and Souths. Following the Round 13 loss against South Sydney, Seibold took a leave of absence to be with his family in Sydney, with Peter Gentle taking over the coaching duties.

After multiple media outlets reported that Brisbane offered Seibold $1 million to depart the club, both parties agreed to an early termination of Seibold's contract, following Brisbane losing 10 games in the season with Seibold at the helm. Seibold left the club having been the only coach to not have a winning record with a ratio of only 34%. Under Seibold, 2020 was the worst year in Brisbane's history with only 3 wins from 20 matches and a points differential of −356 resulting in the club's first ever wooden spoon.

Seibold's tenure at the Broncos concluded amid significant online harassment directed at him and his family. Following this experience, he and journalist Erin Molan appeared before the Australian Senate to advocate for changes to laws concerning online defamation and harassment.

=== Manly Warringah Sea Eagles ===
In November 2022, Seibold signed a three-year deal to become the new head coach of the Manly Warringah Sea Eagles. In his first season in charge of Manly, he guided the club to win only four of the opening ten games. Despite the poor start, the club only sat one point out of the eight. The remainder of the season was mixed, with the club ending the year with eleven wins, twelve losses and one draw, finishing 12th on the table.

Under Seibold, Manly won the NRL Pre-season Challenge in 2023.

Seibold guided Manly to a seventh place finish in the 2024 NRL season. The club would defeat Canterbury in week one of the finals, but were eliminated in the second week by the Sydney Roosters.

In the 2025 NRL season, Seibold guided Manly to a 10th placed finish on the table after the club endured a difficult campaign. Towards the end of the season, there were calls for Seibold to be terminated as head coach from supporters and by sections of the media.

On 27 March 2026, Seibold was fired as head coach of the Manly Warringah Sea Eagles after an 0–3 start to the season. In those three losses, all of them were home matches.

=== Rugby union ===
Following his departure from the Brisbane Broncos, Seibold changed sporting codes and moved to the United Kingdom to take on his role with the England national rugby union team.

Seibold joined the England national rugby union team in September 2021, working as a defence coach under Australian head coach Eddie Jones.
