= 2018 NRL season results =

Australian rugby league season

The 2018 NRL season was the 112th season of professional rugby league in Australia and the 21st season run by the National Rugby League.

== Regular season ==
All times are in AEST (UTC+10:00) on the relevant dates.

=== Round 1 ===
Home	Score	Away	Match information
Home	Score	Away	Date and time	Venue	Referees	Attendance
St George Illawarra Dragons	34-12	Brisbane Broncos	Thursday, 8 March, 7:50pm	UOW Jubilee Oval	Matt Cecchin, Alan Shortall	14,457
Newcastle Knights	19-18	Manly-Warringah Sea Eagles	Friday, 9 March, 6:00pm	McDonald Jones Stadium	Adam Gee, Gavin Reynolds	23,516
North Queensland Cowboys	20-14	Cronulla-Sutherland Sharks	Friday, 9 March, 7:50pm	1300SMILES Stadium	Gerard Sutton, Chris Butler	15,900
Wests Tigers	10-8	Sydney Roosters	Saturday, 10 March, 4:30pm	ANZ Stadium	Gavin Badger, Peter Gough	18,243
South Sydney Rabbitohs	20-32	New Zealand Warriors	Saturday, 10 March, 7:00pm	Optus Stadium	Grant Atkins, Jon Stone	38,842
Canterbury-Bankstown Bulldogs	18-36	Melbourne Storm	Saturday, 10 March, 9:00pm	Optus Stadium	Ben Cummins, Chris Sutton	38,842
Penrith Panthers	24-14	Parramatta Eels	Sunday, 11 March, 4:10pm	Panthers Stadium	Ashley Klein, Matt Noyen	21,506
Gold Coast Titans	30-28	Canberra Raiders	Sunday, 11 March, 6:30pm	Cbus Super Stadium	Henry Parenara, David Munro	10,238

=== Round 2 ===
Home	Score	Away	Match information
Home	Score	Away	Date and time	Venue	Referees	Attendance
Cronulla-Sutherland Sharks	16-20	St George Illawarra Dragons	Thursday, 15 March, 8:05pm	Southern Cross Group Stadium	Gavin Badger, Peter Gough	13,517
Sydney Roosters	30-12	Canterbury-Bankstown Bulldogs	Friday, 16 March, 6:00pm	Allianz Stadium	Gerard Sutton, Chris Butler	12,226
Brisbane Broncos	24-20	North Queensland Cowboys	Friday, 16 March, 8:05pm	Suncorp Stadium	Ben Cummins, Chris Sutton	46,080
New Zealand Warriors	20-8	Gold Coast Titans	Saturday, 17 March, 3:00pm	Mt Smart Stadium	Adam Gee, Gavin Reynolds	14,132
Penrith Panthers	18-14	South Sydney Rabbitohs	Saturday, 17 March, 5:30pm	Panthers Stadium	Henry Perenara, Dave Munro	15,995
Melbourne Storm	8-10	Wests Tigers	Saturday, 17 March, 7:30pm	AAMI Park	Grant Atkins, Jon Stone	18,189
Manly-Warringah Sea Eagles	54-0	Parramatta Eels	Sunday, 18 March, 4:10pm	Lottoland	Matt Cecchin, Alan Shortall	10,502
Canberra Raiders	28-30	Newcastle Knights	Sunday, 18 March, 6:30pm	GIO Stadium	Ashley Klein, Matt Noyen	12,626

=== Round 3 ===
Home	Score	Away	Match information
Home	Score	Away	Date and time	Venue	Referee	Attendance
Melbourne Storm	30-14	North Queensland Cowboys	Thursday, 22 March, 7:50pm	AAMI Park	Matt Cecchin, Chris Butler	12,866
Canterbury-Bankstown Bulldogs	20-18	Penrith Panthers	Friday, 23 March, 6:00pm	ANZ Stadium	Adam Gee, Gavin Reynolds	11,247
Wests Tigers	7-9	Brisbane Broncos	Friday, 23 March, 7:50pm	Campbelltown Stadium	Ashley Klein, Matt Noyen	11,434
Canberra Raiders	19-20	New Zealand Warriors	Saturday, 24 March, 3:00pm	GIO Stadium	Grant Atkins, Jon Stone	11,963
South Sydney Rabbitohs	34-6	Manly-Warringah Sea Eagles	Saturday, 24 March, 5:30pm	ANZ Stadium	Gavin Badger, Ziggy Przeklasa-Adamski	25,106
Parramatta Eels	4-14*	Cronulla-Sutherland Sharks	Saturday, 24 March, 7:30pm	ANZ Stadium	Ben Cummins, Peter Gough	25,106
Gold Coast Titans	8-54	St George Illawarra Dragons	Sunday, 25 March, 4:10pm	Clive Berghofer Stadium	Henry Perenara, Chris Butler	7,297
Sydney Roosters	38-8	Newcastle Knights	Sunday, 25 March, 6:30pm	Allianz Stadium	Chris Sutton, Alan Shortall	15,153

=== Round 4 ===
Home	Score	Away	Match information
Home	Score	Away	Date and time	Venue	Referees	Attendance
North Queensland Cowboys	14-33	Penrith Panthers	Thursday, 29 March, 8:05pm	1300SMILES Stadium	Gavin Badger, Ziggy Przeklasa-Adamski	11,907
South Sydney Rabbitohs	20-16	Canterbury-Bankstown Bulldogs	Friday, 30 March, 4:10pm	ANZ Stadium	Ben Cummins, Peter Gough	32,471
Cronulla-Sutherland Sharks	14-4	Melbourne Storm	Friday, 30 March, 8:05pm	Southern Cross Group Stadium	Matt Cecchin, Alan Shortall	13,000
Sydney Roosters	6-30	New Zealand Warriors	Saturday, 31 March, 5:30pm	Allianz Stadium	Henry Perenara, Ashley Klein	14,493
Manly-Warringah Sea Eagles	32-16	Canberra Raiders	Saturday, 31 March, 7:35pm	Lottoland	Adam Gee, Tim Roby	9,362
St George Illawarra Dragons	30-12	Newcastle Knights	Sunday, 1 April, 4:10pm	WIN Stadium	Grant Atkins, Jon Stone	18,589
Brisbane Broncos	14-26	Gold Coast Titans	Sunday, 1 April, 6:30pm	Suncorp Stadium	Chris Sutton, Chris Butler	30,742
Wests Tigers	30-20	Parramatta Eels	Monday, 2 April, 4:00pm	ANZ Stadium	Gavin Badger, Gavin Reynolds	30,420

=== Round 5 ===
Home	Score	Away	Match information
Home	Score	Away	Date and time	Venue	Referees	Attendance
Canberra Raiders	26-10	Canterbury-Bankstown Bulldogs	Thursday, 5 April, 7:50pm	GIO Stadium	Grant Atkins, Alan Shortall	11,800
Cronulla-Sutherland Sharks	10-28	Sydney Roosters	Friday, 6 April, 6:00pm	Southern Cross Group Stadium	Ben Cummins, Matt Noyen	11,855
St George Illawarra Dragons	16-12	South Sydney Rabbitohs	Friday, 6 April, 7:50pm	UOW Jubilee Oval	Gavin Badger, Peter Gough	16,709
Wests Tigers	11-10	Melbourne Storm	Saturday, 7 April, 3:00pm	Mt Smart Stadium	Adam Gee, Ziggy Przeklasa-Adamski	25,600
New Zealand Warriors	22-12	North Queensland Cowboys	Saturday, 7 April, 5:30pm	Mt Smart Stadium	Matt Cecchin, Phil Henderson	25,600
Newcastle Knights	15-10	Brisbane Broncos	Saturday, 7 April, 7:35pm	McDonald Jones Stadium	Chris Sutton, Chris Butler	21,969
Gold Coast Titans	32-20	Manly-Warringah Sea Eagles	Sunday, 8 April, 2:00pm	Marley Brown Oval	Ashley Klein, Tim Roby	5,136
Parramatta Eels	6-12	Penrith Panthers	Sunday, 8 April, 4:10pm	ANZ Stadium	Henry Perenara, Ben Cummins	10,061

=== Round 6 ===
Home	Score	Away	Match information
Home	Score	Away	Date and time	Venue	Referees	Attendance
Sydney Roosters	14-26	South Sydney Rabbitohs	Thursday, 12 April, 7:50pm	Allianz Stadium	Grant Atkins, Alan Shortall	15,242
Melbourne Storm	40-14	Newcastle Knights	Friday, 13 April, 6:00pm	AAMI Park	Gerard Sutton, Peter Gough	12,386
St George Illawarra Dragons	40-20	Cronulla-Sutherland Sharks	Friday, 13 April, 7:50pm	WIN Stadium	Ashley Klein, Gavin Badger	17,882
New Zealand Warriors	18-27	Brisbane Broncos	Saturday, 14 April, 3:00pm	Mt Smart Stadium	Adam Gee, Ziggy Przeklasa-Adamski	16,636
North Queensland Cowboys	10-27	Canterbury-Bankstown Bulldogs	Saturday, 14 April, 5:30pm	1300SMILES Stadium	Henry Perenara, Tim Roby	14,434
Canberra Raiders	18-2	Parramatta Eels	Saturday, 14 April, 7:35pm	GIO Stadium	Matt Cecchin, Phil Henderson	12,328
Penrith Panthers	35-12	Gold Coast Titans	Sunday, 15 April, 2:00pm	Panthers Stadium	Chris Sutton, Chris Butler	11,091
Manly-Warringah Sea Eagles	12-38	Wests Tigers	Sunday, 15 April, 4:10pm	Lottoland	Ben Cummins, Matt Noyen	15,546

=== Round 7 ===
Home	Score	Away	Match information
Home	Score	Away	Date and time	Venue	Referees	Attendance
Canterbury-Bankstown Bulldogs	0-6	Sydney Roosters	Thursday, 19 April, 7:50pm	ANZ Stadium	Gerard Sutton, Chris Butler	11,309
New Zealand Warriors	20-12	St George Illawarra Dragons	Friday, 20 April, 6:00pm	Mt Smart Stadium	Ben Cummins, Henry Perenara	18,295
Brisbane Broncos	20-34	Melbourne Storm	Friday, 20 April, 7:50pm	Suncorp Stadium	Ashley Klein, Gavin Badger	37,209
South Sydney Rabbitohs	42-22	Canberra Raiders	Saturday, 21 April, 3:00pm	Central Coast Stadium	Adam Gee, Ziggy Przeklasa-Adamski	15,134
Wests Tigers	20-22	Newcastle Knights	Saturday, 21 April, 5:30pm	Scully Park	Chris Butler, Matt Noyen	10,082
North Queensland Cowboys	26-14	Gold Coast Titans	Saturday, 21 April, 7:35pm	1300SMILES Stadium	Grant Atkins, Alan Shortall	12,885
Parramatta Eels	44-10	Manly-Warringah Sea Eagles	Sunday, 22 April, 2:00pm	ANZ Stadium	Chris Sutton, Jon Stone	11,069
Cronulla-Sutherland Sharks	26-22	Penrith Panthers	Sunday, 22 April, 4:10pm	Southern Cross Group Stadium	Matt Cecchin, Phil Henderson	12,677

=== Round 8 ===
Home	Score	Away	Match information
Home	Score	Away	Date and time	Venue	Referees	Attendance
St George Illawarra Dragons	24-8*	Sydney Roosters	Wednesday, 25 April, 4:10pm	Allianz Stadium	Ashley Klein, Gavin Badger	41,142
Melbourne Storm	50-10	New Zealand Warriors	Wednesday, 25 April, 7:00pm	AAMI Park	Gerard Sutton, Chris Sutton	25,731
South Sydney Rabbitohs	20-24	Brisbane Broncos	Thursday, 26 April, 7:50pm	ANZ Stadium	Ben Cummins, Peter Gough	11,123
Manly-Warringah Sea Eagles	12-18	Newcastle Knights	Friday, 27 April, 6:00pm	Lottoland	Adam Gee, Ziggy Przeklasa-Adamski	5,715
Penrith Panthers	22-14	Canterbury-Bankstown Bulldogs	Friday, 27 April, 7:50pm	Panthers Stadium	Grant Atkins, Alan Shortall	13,760
Gold Coast Titans	9-10	Cronulla-Sutherland Sharks	Saturday, 28 April, 5:30pm	Cbus Super Stadium	Chris Butler, Matt Noyen	12,713
North Queensland Cowboys	8-18	Canberra Raiders	Saturday, 28 April, 7:35pm	1300SMILES Stadium	Henry Perenara, Jon Stone	14,004
Parramatta Eels	24-22	Wests Tigers	Sunday, 29 April, 4:10pm	ANZ Stadium	Matt Cecchin, Phil Henderson	17,555

=== Round 9 ===
Home	Score	Away	Match information
Home	Score	Away	Date and time	Venue	Referees	Attendance
Brisbane Broncos	22-20	Canterbury-Bankstown Bulldogs	Thursday, 3 May, 7:50pm	Suncorp Stadium	Gerard Sutton, Chris Sutton	22,225
Newcastle Knights	18-36	South Sydney Rabbitohs	Friday, 4 May, 6:00pm	McDonald Jones Stadium	Gavin Badger, Matt Noyen	22,718
Penrith Panthers	20-26	North Queensland Cowboys	Friday, 4 May, 7:50pm	Carrington Park	Ashley Klein, Peter Gough	10,289
Canberra Raiders	32-18	Gold Coast Titans	Saturday, 5 May, 3:00pm	GIO Stadium	Gavin Reynolds, Alan Shortall	11,170
New Zealand Warriors	26-4	Wests Tigers	Saturday, 5 May, 5:30pm	Mt Smart Stadium	Ben Cummins, Grant Atkins	16,727
Cronulla-Sutherland Sharks	22-20	Parramatta Eels	Saturday, 5 May, 7:35pm	Southern Cross Group Stadium	Adam Gee, Ziggy Przeklasa-Adamski	12,073
St George Illawarra Dragons	34-14	Melbourne Storm	Sunday, 6 May, 2:00pm	UOW Jubilee Oval	Matt Cecchin, Chris Butler	19,173
Sydney Roosters	22-20	Manly-Warringah Sea Eagles	Sunday, 6 May, 4:10pm	Allianz Stadium	Henry Perenara, Jon Stone	10,129

=== Round 10 ===
Home	Score	Away	Match information
Home	Score	Away	Date and time	Venue	Referees	Attendance
Wests Tigers	20-12	North Queensland Cowboys	Thursday, 10 May, 7:50pm	Leichhardt Oval	Gerard Sutton, Matt Noyen	13,127
Newcastle Knights	18-29	Penrith Panthers	Friday, 11 May, 6:00pm	McDonald Jones Stadium	Ashley Klein, Peter Gough	14,801
Canterbury-Bankstown Bulldogs	20-12	Parramatta Eels	Friday, 11 May, 7:50pm	ANZ Stadium	Gavin Reynolds, Alan Shortall	15,683
New Zealand Warriors	0-32	Sydney Roosters	Saturday, 12 May, 3:00pm	Mt Smart Stadium	Matt Cecchin, Jon Stone	14,095
Melbourne Storm	28-14	Gold Coast Titans	Saturday, 12 May, 5:30pm	Suncorp Stadium	Chris Sutton, Gavin Badger	31,118
Manly-Warringah Sea Eagles	38-24	Brisbane Broncos	Saturday, 12 May, 7:35pm	Suncorp Stadium	Grant Atkins, Chris Butler	31,118
South Sydney Rabbitohs	24-10	St George Illawarra Dragons	Sunday, 13 May, 2:00pm	ANZ Stadium	Adam Gee, Ziggy Przeklasa-Adamski	13,062
Canberra Raiders	16-24	Cronulla-Sutherland Sharks	Sunday, 13 May, 4:10pm	GIO Stadium	Ben Cummins, Henry Perenara	11,047

=== Round 11 ===
Home	Score	Away	Match information
Home	Score	Away	Date and time	Venue	Referees	Attendance
Penrith Panthers	16-2	Wests Tigers	Thursday, 17 May, 7:50pm	Panthers Stadium	Ben Cummins, Jon Stone	15,081
Parramatta Eels	14-24	New Zealand Warriors	Friday, 18 May, 6:00pm	ANZ Stadium	Gavin Reynolds, Phil Henderson	9,467
Brisbane Broncos	28-22	Sydney Roosters	Friday, 18 May, 7:50pm	Suncorp Stadium	Gerard Sutton, Gavin Badger	29,009
Gold Coast Titans	33-26	Newcastle Knights	Saturday, 19 May, 3:00pm	Cbus Super Stadium	Grant Atkins, Chris Butler	11,008
North Queensland Cowboys	19-20	South Sydney Rabbitohs	Saturday, 19 May, 5:30pm	1300SMILES Stadium	Chris Sutton, Matt Noyen	14,270
Melbourne Storm	4-24	Manly-Warringah Sea Eagles	Saturday, 19 May, 7:35pm	AAMI Park	Henry Perenara, Ziggy Przeklasa-Adamski	13,172
St George Illawarra Dragons	25-18	Canberra Raiders	Sunday, 20 May, 2:00pm	Glen Willow Stadium	Ashley Klein, Peter Gough	8,962
Cronulla-Sutherland Sharks	22-16	Canterbury-Bankstown Bulldogs	Sunday, 20 May, 4:10pm	Southern Cross Group Stadium	Matt Cecchin, Phil Henderson	14,004

- The match between Melbourne Storm and Manly-Warringah Sea Eagles featured 4 sin bins and a send off. (Jake Trbojevic, Dylan Walker, Apisai Koroisau, Josh Addo-Carr) (Curtis Scott).

=== Round 12 ===
Home	Score	Away	Match information
Home	Score	Away	Date and time	Venue	Referees	Attendance
Brisbane Broncos	18-10	Parramatta Eels	Thursday, 24 May, 7:50pm	Suncorp Stadium	Ashley Klein, Ziggy Przeklasa-Adamski	21,555
Canberra Raiders	21-20	Manly-Warringah Sea Eagles	Friday, 25 May, 6:00pm	GIO Stadium	Chris Butler, Alan Shortall	11,105
North Queensland Cowboys	6-7	Melbourne Storm	Friday, 25 May, 7:50pm	1300SMILES Stadium	Matt Cecchin, Gavin Badger	16,003
Sydney Roosters	34-14	Gold Coast Titans	Saturday, 26 May, 3:00pm	Central Coast Stadium	Ben Cummins, Peter Gough	10,194
New Zealand Warriors	10-30	South Sydney Rabbitohs	Saturday, 26 May, 5:30pm	Mt Smart Stadium	Grant Atkins, Phil Henderson	15,958
Penrith Panthers	28-2	St George Illawarra Dragons	Saturday, 26 May, 7:35pm	Panthers Stadium	Gerard Sutton, Chris Sutton	21,565
Newcastle Knights	10-48	Cronulla-Sutherland Sharks	Sunday, 27 May, 2:00pm	McDonald Jones Stadium	Jon Stone, Gavin Reynolds	20,913
Wests Tigers	14-10	Canterbury-Bankstown Bulldogs	Sunday, 27 May, 4:10pm	ANZ Stadium	Henry Perenara, Gavin Badger	18,847

=== Round 13 ===
Home	Score	Away	Match information
Home	Score	Away	Date and time	Venue	Referees	Attendance
Manly-Warringah Sea Eagles	12-26	North Queensland Cowboys	Thursday, 31 May, 7:50pm	Lottoland	Ben Cummins, Peter Gough	6,172
South Sydney Rabbitohs	22-14	Cronulla-Sutherland Sharks	Friday, 1 June, 7:50pm	ANZ Stadium	Henry Perenara, Matt Cecchin	10,410
Parramatta Eels	4-30	Newcastle Knights	Saturday, 2 June, 7:35pm	ANZ Stadium	Chris Sutton, Gavin Reynolds	7,719
Sydney Roosters	16-14	Wests Tigers	Sunday, 3 June, 4:10pm	Allianz Stadium	Grant Aitkins, Phil Henderson	11,182
Bye: Brisbane Broncos, Canberra Raiders, Canterbury-Bankstown Bulldogs, Gold Coast Titans, Melbourne Storm, New Zealand Warriors, Penrith Panthers & St George Illawarra Dragons.

=== Round 14 ===
Home	Score	Away	Match information
Home	Score	Away	Date and time	Venue	Referees	Attendance
Canberra Raiders	22-23	Penrith Panthers	Friday, 8 June, 6:00pm	GIO Stadium	Henry Perenara, Chris Butler	7,662
Gold Coast Titans	16-18	South Sydney Rabbitohs	Friday, 8 June, 7:50pm	Cbus Super Stadium	Grant Atkins, Phil Henderson	11,833
Manly-Warringah Sea Eagles	14-34	New Zealand Warriors	Saturday, 9 June, 3:00pm	AMI Stadium	Chris Sutton, Gavin Reynolds	17,357
Newcastle Knights	16-18	Sydney Roosters	Saturday, 9 June, 5:30pm	McDonald Jones Stadium	Jon Stone, Alan Shortall	18,029
Parramatta Eels	20-14	North Queensland Cowboys	Saturday, 9 June, 7:30pm	TIO Stadium	Peter Gough, Gavin Badger	8,393
Cronulla-Sutherland Sharks	24-16	Wests Tigers	Sunday, 10 June, 2:00pm	Southern Cross Group Stadium	Adam Gee, Ziggy Przeklasa-Adamski	13,093
Melbourne Storm	32-16	Brisbane Broncos	Sunday, 10 June, 4:10pm	AAMI Park	Ben Cummins, Matt Noylen	17,106
Canterbury-Bankstown Bulldogs	16-18*	St George Illawarra Dragons	Monday, 11 June, 4:00pm	ANZ Stadium	Matt Cecchin, Tim Roby	21,376

=== Round 15 ===
Home	Score	Away	Match information
Home	Score	Away	Date and time	Venue	Referees	Attendance
Parramatta Eels	24-42	South Sydney Rabbitohs	Thursday, 14 June, 7:50pm	ANZ Stadium	Gerard Sutton, Peter Gough	8,047
North Queensland Cowboys	16-23	New Zealand Warriors	Friday, 15 June, 6:00pm	1300SMILES Stadium	Henry Perenara, Zbignew Przeklasa-Adamski	11,062
Sydney Roosters	32-6	Penrith Panthers	Friday, 15 June, 7:50pm	Allianz Stadium	Ben Cummins, Ashley Klein	10,078
Canterbury-Bankstown Bulldogs	10-32	Gold Coast Titans	Saturday, 16 June, 3:00pm	Belmore Sports Ground	Chris Sutton, Gavin Reynolds	6,874
St George Illawarra Dragons	32-8	Manly-Warringah Sea Eagles	Saturday, 16 June, 5:30pm	WIN Stadium	Jon Stone, Alan Shortall	13,069
Cronulla-Sutherland Sharks	16-20	Brisbane Broncos	Saturday, 16 June, 7:35pm	Southern Cross Group Stadium	Matt Cecchin, Matt Noyen	14,587
Newcastle Knights	10-28	Melbourne Storm	Sunday, 17 June, 2:00pm	McDonald Jones Stadium	Adam Gee, Chris Butler	14,803
Wests Tigers	12-48	Canberra Raiders	Sunday, 17 June, 4:10pm	Campbelltown Stadium	Grant Atkins, Gavin Badger	10,237

=== Round 16 ===
Home	Score	Away	Match information
Home	Score	Away	Date and time	Venue	Referees	Attendance
St George Illawarra Dragons	20- 18	Parramatta Eels	Thursday, 28 June, 7:50pm	WIN Stadium	Ben Cummins, Peter Gough	6,933
New Zealand Warriors	15-18	Cronulla-Sutherland Sharks	Friday, 29 June, 6:00pm	Mt Smart Stadium	Adam Gee, Chris Butler	14,195
Sydney Roosters	8-9	Melbourne Storm	Friday, 29 June, 7:50pm	Adelaide Oval	Grant Atkins, Gavin Badger	17,728
Penrith Panthers	10-18	Manly-Warringah Sea Eagles	Saturday, 30 June, 3:00pm	Panthers Stadium	Gerard Sutton, Matt Noyen	12,755
Newcastle Knights	16-36	Canterbury-Bankstown Bulldogs	Saturday, 30 June, 5:30pm	McDonald Jones Stadium	Adam Gee, Chris Butler	17,755
Brisbane Broncos	26-22	Canberra Raiders	Saturday, 30 June, 7:35pm	Suncorp Stadium	Chris Sutton, Alan Shortall	30,945
Wests Tigers	12-30	Gold Coast Titans	Sunday, 1 July, 2:00pm	Leichhardt Oval	Jon Stone, Gavin Reynolds	16,984
South Sydney Rabbitohs	21-20	North Queensland Cowboys	Sunday, 1 July, 4:10pm	Barlow Park	Matt Cecchin, Ashley Klein	7,195

=== Round 17 ===
Home	Score	Away	Match information
Home	Score	Away	Date and time	Venue	Referees	Attendance
Melbourne Storm	52-30	St George Illawarra Dragons	Thursday, 5 July, 7:50pm	AAMI Park	Matt Cecchin, Gavin Reynolds	12,167
Penrith Panthers	36-4	New Zealand Warriors	Friday, 6 July, 7:50pm	Panthers Stadium	Ben Cummins, Chris Sutton	10,255
Canterbury-Bankstown Bulldogs	28-32	Canberra Raiders	Saturday, 7 July, 7:35pm	Belmore Sports Ground	Grant Atkins, Gavin Badger	10,145
Gold Coast Titans	0-34	Brisbane Broncos	Sunday, 8 July, 4:10pm	Cbus Super Stadium	Henry Perenara, Adam Gee	18,005
Bye: Cronulla-Sutherland Sharks, Manly-Warringah Sea Eagles, Newcastle Knights, North Queensland Cowboys, Parramatta Eels, South Sydney Rabbitohs, Sydney Roosters & Wests Tigers.

- Canberra trailed 14–28 with 5:34 left on the clock and then scored three tries to win 32–28.

=== Round 18 ===
Home	Score	Away	Match information
Home	Score	Away	Date and time	Venue	Referees	Attendance
Penrith Panthers	12-24	Cronulla-Sutherland Sharks	Friday, 13 July, 6:00pm	Panthers Stadium	Matt Cecchin, Phil Henderson	11,742
Newcastle Knights	18-16	Parramatta Eels	Friday, 13 July, 7:50pm	McDonald Jones Stadium	Adam Gee, Tim Rigby	15,860
Canterbury-Bankstown Bulldogs	6-24	South Sydney Rabbitohs	Saturday, 14 July, 3:00pm	ANZ Stadium	Peter Gough, Gavin Badger	14,278
Manly-Warringah Sea Eagles	13-14	Melbourne Storm	Saturday, 14 July, 5:30pm	Lottoland	Chris Sutton, Gavin Reynolds	9,277
Canberra Raiders	38-12	North Queensland Cowboys	Saturday, 14 July, 7:35pm	GIO Stadium	Henry Perenara, Liam Kennedy	11,471
Brisbane Broncos	6-26	New Zealand Warriors	Sunday, 15 July, 2:00pm	Suncorp Stadium	Grant Atkins, Matt Noyen	37,493
St George Illawarra Dragons	16-20	Wests Tigers	Sunday, 15 July, 4:10pm	UOW Jubilee Oval	Ben Cummins, Ziggy Przeklasa-Adamski	15,992
Gold Coast Titans	12-20	Sydney Roosters	Sunday, 15 July, 6:30pm	Cbus Super Stadium	Jon Stone, Chris Butler	10,074

=== Round 19 ===
Home	Score	Away	Match information
Home	Score	Away	Date and time	Venue	Referees	Attendance
Parramatta Eels	14-8	Canterbury-Bankstown Bulldogs	Thursday, 19 July, 7:50pm	ANZ Stadium	Henry Perenara, Phil Henderson	8,437
Cronulla-Sutherland Sharks	28-24	Canberra Raiders	Friday, 20 July, 6:00pm	Southern Cross Group Stadium	Gerard Sutton, Gavin Reynolds	10,006
Brisbane Broncos	50-18	Penrith Panthers	Friday, 20 July, 7:50pm	Suncorp Stadium	Ashley Klein, Chris Sutton	26,357
Newcastle Knights	30-24	Gold Coast Titans	Saturday, 21 July, 3:00pm	McDonald Jones Stadium	Peter Gough, Gavin Badger	14,095
Wests Tigers	22-6	South Sydney Rabbitohs	Saturday, 21 July, 5:30pm	ANZ Stadium	Matt Cecchin, Chris Butler	25,963
North Queensland Cowboys	10-24	St George Illawarra Dragons	Saturday, 21 July, 7:35pm	1300SMILES Stadium	Adam Gee, Ziggy Przeklasa-Adamski	18,068
New Zealand Warriors	6-12	Melbourne Storm	Sunday, 22 July, 2:00pm	Mt Smart Stadium	Ben Cummins, Jon Stone	17,695
Manly-Warringah Sea Eagles	24-56	Sydney Roosters	Sunday, 22 July, 4:10pm	Lottoland	Grant Atkins, Matt Noyen	9,427

=== Round 20 ===
Home	Score	Away	Match information
Home	Score	Away	Date and time	Venue	Referees	Attendance
Brisbane Broncos	12-10	Cronulla-Sutherland Sharks	Thursday, 26 July, 7:50pm	Suncorp Stadium	Grant Atkins, Matt Noyen	22,859
North Queensland Cowboys	20-18	Newcastle Knights	Friday, 27 July, 6:00pm	1300SMILES Stadium	Henry Perenara, Jon Stone	11,709
Canterbury-Bankstown Bulldogs	16-4	Wests Tigers	Friday, 27 July, 7:50pm	ANZ Stadium	Matt Cecchin, Chris Butler	9,865
Manly-Warringah Sea Eagles	24-28	Penrith Panthers	Saturday, 28 July, 3:00pm	Lottoland	Ben Cummins, Gavin Badger	6,134
South Sydney Rabbitohs	26-20	Parramatta Eels	Saturday, 28 July, 5:30pm	ANZ Stadium	Peter Gough, Alan Shortall	15,542
Melbourne Storm	44-10	Canberra Raiders	Saturday, 28 July, 7:35pm	AAMI Park	Adam Gee, Ziggy Przeklasa-Adamski	15,298
Gold Coast Titans	36-12	New Zealand Warriors	Sunday, 29 July, 2:00pm	Cbus Super Stadium	Gerard Sutton, Phil Henderson	15,149
Sydney Roosters	36-18	St George Illawarra Dragons	Sunday, 29 July, 4:10pm	Allianz Stadium	Ashley Klein, Chris Sutton	19,878

=== Round 21 ===
Home	Score	Away	Match information
Home	Score	Away	Date and time	Venue	Referees	Attendance
Canterbury-Bankstown Bulldogs	36-22	Brisbane Broncos	Thursday, 2 August, 7:50pm	ANZ Stadium	Ben Cummins, Peter Gough	6,434
Newcastle Knights	16-25	Wests Tigers	Friday, 3 August, 6:00pm	McDonald Jones Stadium	Grant Atkins, Matt Noyen	18,561
South Sydney Rabbitohs	30-20	Melbourne Storm	Friday, 3 August, 7:50pm	ANZ Stadium	Ashley Klein, Jon Stone	15,132
St George Illawarra Dragons	12-18	New Zealand Warriors	Saturday, 4 August, 3:00pm	WIN Stadium	Gerard Sutton, Chris Butler	13,924
Parramatta Eels	28-12	Gold Coast Titans	Saturday, 4 August, 5:30pm	ANZ Stadium	Chris Sutton, Tim Roby	6,158
Sydney Roosters	26-20	North Queensland Cowboys	Saturday, 4 August, 7:35pm	Allianz Stadium	Adam Gee, Alan Shortall	9,721
Cronulla-Sutherland Sharks	32-33	Manly-Warringah Sea Eagles	Sunday, 5 August, 2:00pm	Southern Cross Group Stadium	Henry Perenara, Ziggy Przeklasa-Adamski	13,273
Penrith Panthers	40-31	Canberra Raiders	Sunday, 5 August, 4:10pm	Panthers Stadium	Matt Cecchin, Phil Henderson	12,195

=== Round 22 (Women In League Round) ===
Home	Score	Away	Match information
Home	Score	Away	Date and time	Venue	Referees	Attendance
North Queensland Cowboys	34-30	Brisbane Broncos	Thursday, 9 August, 7:50pm	1300SMILES Stadium	Grant Atkins, Peter Gough	19,663
New Zealand Warriors	20-4	Newcastle Knights	Friday, 10 August, 6:00pm	Mt Smart Stadium	Matt Cecchin, Alan Shortall	14,395
South Sydney Rabbitohs	14-18	Sydney Roosters	Friday, 10 August, 7:50pm	ANZ Stadium	Gerard Sutton, Jon Stone	26,331
Gold Coast Titans	16-17	Penrith Panthers	Saturday, 11 August, 3:00pm	Cbus Super Stadium	Henry Perenara, Ziggy Przeklasa-Adamski	11,283
Manly-Warringah Sea Eagles	18-6	Canterbury-Bankstown Bulldogs	Saturday, 11 August, 5:30pm	Lottoland	Chris Sutton, Tim Roby	7,846
Parramatta Eels	40-4	St George Illawarra Dragons	Saturday, 11 August, 7:35pm	ANZ Stadium	Adam Gee, Phil Henderson	10,541
Canberra Raiders	20-22	Wests Tigers	Sunday, 12 August, 2:00pm	GIO Stadium	Ben Cummins, Chris Butler	14,583
Melbourne Storm	14-17	Cronulla-Sutherland Sharks	Sunday, 12 August, 4:10pm	AAMI Park	Ashley Klein, Matt Noyen	16,709

=== Round 23 ===
Home	Score	Away	Match information
Home	Score	Away	Date and time	Venue	Referees	Attendance
Brisbane Broncos	38-18	South Sydney Rabbitohs	Thursday, 16 August, 7:50pm	Suncorp Stadium	Ashley Klein, Chris Sutton	29,241
Manly-Warringah Sea Eagles	34-42	Gold Coast Titans	Friday, 17 August, 6:00pm	Lottoland	Chris Butler, Gavin Reynolds	6,832
Melbourne Storm	20-4	Parramatta Eels	Friday, 17 August, 7:50pm	AAMI Park	Gerard Sutton, Adam Gee	12,136
Penrith Panthers	12-20	Newcastle Knights	Saturday, 18 August, 3:00pm	Panthers Stadium	Ben Cummins, Alan Shortall	14,125
Wests Tigers	10-20	St George Illawarra Dragons	Saturday, 18 August, 5:30pm	Leichhardt Oval	Grant Atkins, Matt Noyen	18,387
Cronulla-Sutherland Sharks	28-16	North Queensland Cowboys	Saturday, 18 August, 7:35pm	Southern Cross Group Stadium	Matt Cecchin, Peter Gough	12,270
Canterbury-Bankstown Bulldogs	27-26	New Zealand Warriors	Sunday, 19 August, 2:00pm	ANZ Stadium	Jon Stone, Gavin Badger	9,688
Canberra Raiders	14-12	Sydney Roosters	Sunday, 19 August, 4:10pm	GIO Stadium	Henry Perenara, Ziggy Przeklasa-Adamski	10,594

=== Round 24 ===
Home	Score	Away	Match information
Home	Score	Away	Date and time	Venue	Referees	Attendance
Wests Tigers	22-20	Manly-Warringah Sea Eagles	Thursday, 23 August, 7:50pm	Campbelltown Stadium	Matt Cecchin, Alan Shortall	8,163
New Zealand Warriors	36-16	Penrith Panthers	Friday, 24 August, 6:00pm	Mt Smart Stadium	Ashley Klein, Chris Sutton	17,195
North Queensland Cowboys	44-6	Parramatta Eels	Friday, 24 August, 7:50pm	1300SMILES Stadium	Grant Atkins, Phil Henderson	25,095
Canberra Raiders	24-12	South Sydney Rabbitohs	Saturday, 25 August, 3:00pm	GIO Stadium	Adam Gee, Gavin Reynolds	15,900
Gold Coast Titans	8-10	Melbourne Storm	Saturday, 25 August, 5:30pm	Cbus Super Stadium	Matt Noyen, Gavin Badger	14,266
Sydney Roosters	8-22	Brisbane Broncos	Saturday, 25 August, 7:35pm	Allianz Stadium	Gerard Sutton, Peter Gough	13,263
Cronulla-Sutherland Sharks	38-12	Newcastle Knights	Sunday, 26 August, 2:00pm	Southern Cross Group Stadium	Jon Stone, Ziggy Przeklasa-Adamski	11,836
St George Illawarra Dragons	0-38	Canterbury-Bankstown Bulldogs	Sunday, 26 August, 4:10pm	UOW Jubilee Oval	Ben Cummins, Henry Perenara	12,436

=== Round 25 ===
Home	Score	Away	Match information
Home	Score	Away	Date and time	Venue	Referees	Attendance
South Sydney Rabbitohs	51-10	Wests Tigers	Thursday, 30 August, 7:50pm	ANZ Stadium	Ashley Klein, Adam Gee	12,037
New Zealand Warriors	20-16	Canberra Raiders	Friday, 31 August, 6:00pm	Mt Smart Stadium	Matt Cecchin, Phil Henderson	24,595
Melbourne Storm	16-22	Penrith Panthers	Friday, 31 August, 7:50pm	AAMI Park	Gerard Sutton, Peter Gough	20,637
Newcastle Knights	14-24	St George Illawarra Dragons	Saturday, 1 September, 3:00pm	McDonald Jones Stadium	Henry Perenara, Ziggy Przeklasa-Adamski	24,662
Gold Coast Titans	26-30	North Queensland Cowboys	Saturday, 1 September, 5:30pm	Cbus Super Stadium	Matt Noyen, Gavin Badger	26,681
Parramatta Eels	10-44	Sydney Roosters	Saturday, 1 September, 7:35pm	ANZ Stadium	Jon Stone, Gavin Reynolds	11,543
Canterbury-Bankstown Bulldogs	18-30	Cronulla-Sutherland Sharks	Sunday, 2 September, 2:00pm	ANZ Stadium	Grant Atkins, Chris Sutton	14,189
Brisbane Broncos	48-16	Manly-Warringah Sea Eagles	Sunday, 2 September, 4:10pm	Suncorp Stadium	Ben Cummins, Alan Shortall	41,538

- Penrith defeated Melbourne in Melbourne for the first time since round 15, 2005.
