= Henry Lazarus =

British clarinet virtuoso

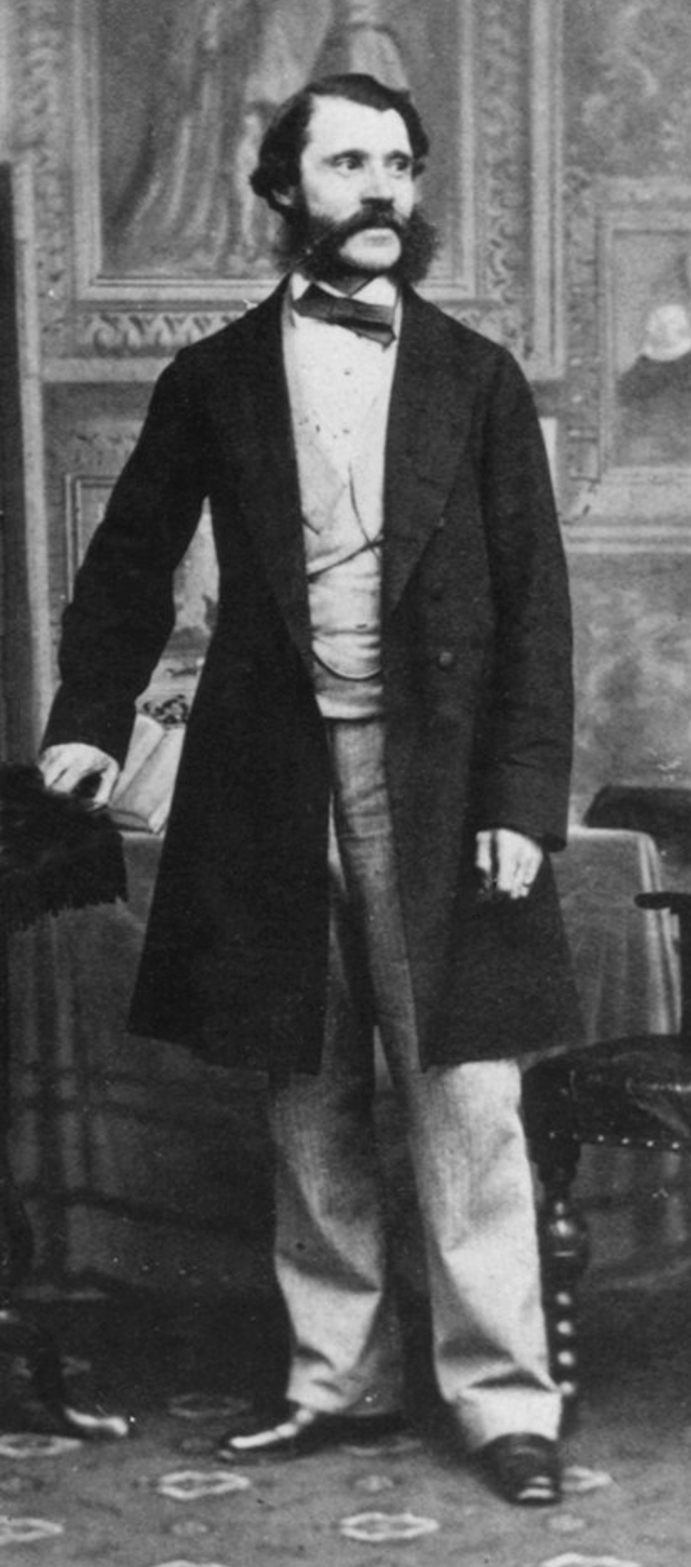
Henry Lazarus

Henry Lazarus (1 January 1815 – 6 March 1895) was the leading British clarinet virtuoso of the 19th century. George Bernard Shaw wrote of Henry Lazarus:

He was the best clarionet [old spelling, now clarinet] player in England; when you were sitting behind Costa at the Opera you listened for certain phrases from the clarionet just as you did from the prima donna, except that you were much less likely to be disappointed in the former case.

Lazarus was born in London. Raised as an orphan in the Royal Military Asylum in Chelsea, he there learned the instrument from the bandmaster John Blizzard. He later studied under Charles Godfrey, bandmaster of the Coldstream Guards. His solo debut came in 1838.

"After fulfilling engagements in various theatrical and other orchestras, he was appointed second clarinet in the Sacred Harmonic Society in 1838. In 1840, he became first clarinetist at the opera, and at the principal concerts in London and the provinces, and was immediately recognized as the foremost clarinetist in all England." In 1871 he gave a highly successful concert tour of England and Wales with the pianist Stephen Kemp.

Lazarus was professor of clarinet at the Royal Academy of Music from 1854 to 1895 and at the Military School of Music (Kneller Hall) "for a considerable period" from 1858. He wrote a Method for the Clarinet based on the Boehm system, although he used primarily Albert System instruments, made by Eugène Albert, himself – some horns are even stamped, "Approved by Mr. Lazarus". His method books are still in use today, and include duets, etudes, studies, finger exercises, scales, etc.

Lazarus also played the basset horn and saxophone.

"In both orchestral and solo playing, the beauty and richness of his tone, his excellent phrasing, and his neat and expressive execution were equally admired. He gave a farewell concert in St. James Hall, [on] 31 May 1892, and died in London, [on] 6 March 1895, and was buried in Brompton Cemetery, London, after having given to the world the wonderful method which bears his name (Lazarus Clarinet School), and which will stand as a monument to his greatness."

== Compositions ==
Works include

- Fantasia on Favorite Scotch Melodies
- Fantasia on Airs from Bellini's 'I Puritani'

and many others.

== Bibliography ==
- Pamela Weston (November 1974) "Lazarus' Instrument Collection". NACWPI
- Pamela Weston (1971) Clarinet Virtuosi of the Past Emerson, York ISBN 978-0-95062-098-5
- Jack Brymer- "Jolly good fellow, 'Henry Lazarus'", The Clarinet, 24:20, Summer 1950 & Fall 1956
