= Carrington Park =

Stadium in New South Wales, Australia

- Interactive map of Carrington Park
- Location: Howick Street, Bathurst, NSW
- Coordinates: 33.419568°S 149.585166°E
- Owner: Bathurst Regional Council
- Capacity: 11,500 (Undercover Grandstand 1,100)
- Surface: Grass
- Record attendance: 19,149: Farewell Yellow Brick Road tour (22 January 2020)

Tenants
- Penrith Panthers (NRL); Bathurst Panthers

Website
- Council Website

Carrington Park is a multi-purpose stadium in Bathurst, New South Wales, Australia. It has a capacity of 11,500.

== Association football ==
Carrington Park hosted an A-League Regional Round clash between Adelaide United and Newcastle Jets on 25 January 2012.

== Rugby league ==
On 8 June 2001, Carrington Park hosted its first City versus Country match. Country defeated City 42–10 in front of a crowd of 8,872.

On 26 July 2014, Carrington Park hosted an NRL game between the Penrith Panthers and the Cronulla-Sutherland Sharks, the Sharks winning 18–16. Another NRL match was played at the ground on Saturday 14 March 2015 between Penrith Panthers and Gold Coast Titans. The Panthers won 40–0.

The record NRL crowd was set on Saturday 20 April 2024 when the match between the Penrith Panthers and the Wests Tigers attracted 12,000 spectators.

=== National Rugby League matches ===
#	Date	Result	Attendance	Notes
1	26 July 2014	Cronulla def. Penrith 18–16	8,824	2014 NRL season results
2	14 March 2015	Penrith def. Gold Coast 40–0	6,240	2015 NRL season results
3	30 April 2016	Penrith def. Canberra 19–18	6,721	2016 NRL season results
4	10 June 2017	Penrith def. Canberra 24–20	8,730	2017 NRL season results
5	4 May 2018	North Queensland def. Penrith 26–20	10,289	2018 NRL season results
6	30 March 2019	Melbourne def. Penrith 32–2	10,973	2019 NRL season results
7	1 May 2021	Penrith def. Manly-Warringah 28–16	5,798	2021 NRL season results
8	26 March 2022	Penrith def. Newcastle 38–20	11,253	2022 NRL season results
9	29 April 2023	Wests def. Penrith 12–8	11,055	2023 NRL season results
10	20 April 2024	Penrith def. Wests 22–6	12,000	2024 NRL season results
11	24 May 2025	Newcastle def. Penrith 25–6	12,000	2025 NRL season results

== Concerts ==
As a part of his Farewell Yellow Brick Road tour, English musician Elton John performed at Carrington Park on 22 January 2020 before a record crowd of 19,149.
