= 2017 NRL season results =

2017 National Rugby League
- Teams: 16
- Premiers: Melbourne Storm (3 title)
- Minor premiers: Melbourne Storm (3 title)
- Top points scorer: Nathan Cleary (216)
- Top try-scorer: Suliasi Vunivalu (23)

The 2017 NRL season is the 110th season of professional rugby league in Australia and the 20th season run by the National Rugby League. The season started in with the annual Auckland Nines, and was followed by the All Stars Match. Round 1 commenced on 2 March with 2016 premiers Cronulla-Sutherland Sharks playing Brisbane Broncos.

== Venues ==
All matches will be hosted across 26 different venues in both Australia and New Zealand.

=== Australian venues ===
| Adelaide | Bathurst | Brisbane | Cairns | Canberra | Darwin |
|---|---|---|---|---|---|
| Adelaide Oval | Carrington Park | Suncorp Stadium | Barlow Park | GIO Stadium | TIO Stadium |
| Capacity: 53,500 | Capacity: 10,000 | Capacity: 52,500 | Capacity: 18,000 | Capacity: 25,011 | Capacity: 12,500 |
| Matches: 1 | Matches: 1 | Matches: 15 | Matches: 1 | Matches: 12 | Matches: 1 |
| Gosford | Gold Coast | Melbourne | Newcastle | Perth | Sydney |
| Central Coast Stadium | Cbus Super Stadium | AAMI Park | McDonald Jones Stadium | nib Stadium | Belmore Sports Ground |
| Capacity: 20,059 | Capacity: 27,400 | Capacity: 30,050 | Capacity: 33,000 | Capacity: 20,050 | Capacity: 19,000 |
| Matches: 1 | Matches: 12 | Matches: 13 | Matches: 12 | Matches: 2 | Matches: 2 |
| Sydney | Sydney | Sydney | Sydney | Sydney | Sydney |
| Lottoland | Campbelltown Stadium | Southern Cross Group Stadium | UOW Jubilee Oval | Leichhardt Oval | Pepper Stadium |
| Capacity: 23,000 | Capacity: 20,000 | Capacity: 22,000 | Capacity: 20,505 | Capacity: 20,000 | Capacity: 22,500 |
| Matches: 10 | Matches: 4 | Matches: 12 | Matches: 5 | Matches: 4 | Matches: 11 |
| Sydney | Sydney | Sydney | Townsville | Wollongong | |
| ANZ Stadium | Allianz Stadium | Sydney Cricket Ground | 1300SMILES Stadium | WIN Stadium | |
| Capacity: 83,500 | Capacity: 45,500 | Capacity: 46,000 | Capacity: 26,500 | Capacity: 23,000 | |
| Matches: 37 | Matches: 15 | Matches: 1 | Matches: 12 | Matches: 4 | |
2017 NRL season results is located in Australia 2017 NRL season results is located in New South Wales

=== New Zealand venues ===
| Auckland | Dunedin | Palmerston North |
|---|---|---|
| Mount Smart Stadium | Forsyth Barr Stadium | FMG Stadium |
| Capacity: 30,000 | Capacity: 30,748 | Capacity: 25,800 |
| Matches: 11 | Matches: 1 | Matches: 1 |
2017 NRL season results is located in New Zealand

== Round 1 ==
| Home | Score | Away | Match Information |
| Home | Score | Away | Date and Time (AEDT) | Venue | Referee | Attendance |
|---|---|---|---|---|---|---|
| Cronulla-Sutherland Sharks | 18-26 | Brisbane Broncos | Thursday, 2 March, 8:05 pm | Southern Cross Group Stadium | Matt Cecchin, Alan Shortall | 11,493 |
| Canterbury-Bankstown Bulldogs | 6-12 | Melbourne Storm | Friday, 3 March, 6:00 pm | Belmore Sports Ground | Gerard Sutton, Matt Noyen | 8,712 |
| South Sydney Rabbitohs | 18-34 | Wests Tigers | Friday, 3 March, 8:05 pm | ANZ Stadium | Ashley Klein, Chris James | 16,976 |
| St. George Illawarra Dragons | 42-10 | Penrith Panthers | Saturday, 4 March 2017 4:30 pm | UOW Jubilee Oval | Henry Perenara, Peter Gough | 7,283 |
| North Queensland Cowboys | 20-16 (gp) | Canberra Raiders | Saturday, 4 March, 7:00 pm | 1300SMILES Stadium | Ben Cummins, Chris Sutton | 17,548 |
| Gold Coast Titans | 18-32 | Sydney Roosters | Saturday, 4 March, 9:00 pm | Cbus Super Stadium | Gavin Badger, Jon Stone | 13,933 |
| New Zealand Warriors | 26-22 | Newcastle Knights | Sunday, 5 March, 2:00 pm | Mt Smart Stadium | Dave Munro, Alan Shortall | 13,712 |
| Manly-Warringah Sea Eagles | 12-20 | Parramatta Eels | Sunday, 5 March, 4:00 pm | Lottoland | Grant Atkins, Chris Butler | 11,318 |

- Total Points Scored: 332

== Round 2 ==
| Home | Score | Away | Match Information |
| Home | Score | Away | Date and Time (AEDT) | Venue | Referee | Attendance |
|---|---|---|---|---|---|---|
| Sydney Roosters | 28-24 | Canterbury-Bankstown Bulldogs | Thursday, 9 March, 8:05 pm | Allianz Stadium | Ben Cummins, Chris Sutton | 13,505 |
| New Zealand Warriors | 10-26 | Melbourne Storm | Friday, 10 March, 6:00 pm | Mt Smart Stadium | Grant Atkins, Chris Butler | 9,811 |
| Brisbane Broncos | 20-21 (gp) | North Queensland Cowboys | Friday, 10 March, 8:05 pm | Suncorp Stadium | Matt Cecchin, Alan Shortall | 47,703 |
| Newcastle Knights | 34-26 | Gold Coast Titans | Saturday, 11 March, 3:00 pm | McDonald Jones Stadium | Henry Perenara. Peter Gough | 12,869 |
| Manly-Warringah Sea Eagles | 18-38 | South Sydney Rabbitohs | Saturday, 11 March, 5:30 pm | Lottoland | Gavin Badger, Jon Stone | 10,183 |
| Canberra Raiders | 16-42 | Cronulla-Sutherland Sharks | Saturday, 11 March, 7:30 pm | GIO Stadium | Ashley Klein, Chris James | 15,807 |
| Wests Tigers | 2-36 | Penrith Panthers | Sunday, 12 March, 4:00 pm | Campbelltown Stadium | Gerard Sutton, Matt Noyen | 12,232 |
| St. George Illawarra Dragons | 16-34 | Parramatta Eels | Sunday, 12 March, 6:30 pm | WIN Stadium | Dave Munro, Chris Sutton | 16,023 |

- Total Points Scored: 391

== Round 3 ==
| Home | Score | Away | Match Information |
| Home | Score | Away | Date and Time (AEDT) | Venue | Referee | Attendance |
|---|---|---|---|---|---|---|
| Melbourne Storm | 14-12 | Brisbane Broncos | Thursday, 16 March 2017 8:05 pm | AAMI Park | Gerard Sutton, Matt Noyen | 16,344 |
| Canterbury-Bankstown Bulldogs | 24-12 | New Zealand Warriors | Friday, 17 March 2017 6:00 pm | Forsyth Barr Stadium | Gavin Badger, Jon Stone | 10,238 |
| Gold Coast Titans | 26 -14 | Parramatta Eels | Friday, 17 March 2017 8:05 pm | Cbus Super Stadium | Ashley Klein, Chris James | 11,612 |
| Newcastle Knights | 18-24 | South Sydney Rabbitohs | Saturday, 18 March 2017 4:30 pm | McDonald Jones Stadium | Dave Munro, Chris Sutton | 15,212 |
| Penrith Panthers | 12-14 | Sydney Roosters | Saturday, 18 March 2017 7:00 pm | Pepper Stadium | Grant Atkins, Chris Butler | 11,044 |
| North Queensland Cowboys | 8-30 | Manly-Warringah Sea Eagles | Saturday, 18 March 2017 9:00 pm | 1300SMILES Stadium | Henry Perenara, Peter Gough | 14,763 |
| Canberra Raiders | 46-6 | Wests Tigers | Sunday, 19 March 2017 4:00 pm | GIO Stadium | Matt Cecchin, Alan Shortall | 14,628 |
| Cronulla-Sutherland Sharks | 10-16 | St. George Illawarra Dragons | Sunday, 19 March 2017 6:30 pm | Southern Cross Group Stadium | Ben Cummins, Adam Gee | 14,247 |

- Total Points Scored: 286

== Round 4 ==
| Home | Score | Away | Match Information |
| Home | Score | Away | Date and Time (AEDT) | Venue | Referee | Attendance |
|---|---|---|---|---|---|---|
| South Sydney Rabbitohs | 6-20 | Sydney Roosters | Thursday, 23 March, 8:05 pm | ANZ Stadium | Gerard Sutton, Alan Shortall | 10,479 |
| Penrith Panthers | 40-0 | Newcastle Knights | Friday, 24 March, 6:00 pm | Pepper Stadium | Henry Perenara, Gavin Reynolds | 10,567 |
| Brisbane Broncos | 13-12 | Canberra Raiders | Friday, 24 March, 8:05 pm | Suncorp Stadium | Ashley Klein, Adam Gee | 29,370 |
| Manly-Warringah Sea Eagles | 36-0 | Canterbury-Bankstown Bulldogs | Saturday, 25 March, 4:30 pm | Lottoland | Gavin Badger, Jon Stone | 9,610 |
| Parramatta Eels | 6-20 | Cronulla-Sutherland Sharks | Saturday, 25 March, 7:00 pm | ANZ Stadium | Matt Cecchin, Chris James | 17,003 |
| Gold Coast Titans | 26-32 | North Queensland Cowboys | Saturday, 25 March, 9:00 pm | Cbus Super Stadium | Grant Atkins, Matt Noyen | 17,674 |
| Wests Tigers | 14-22 | Melbourne Storm | Sunday, 26 March, 4:00 pm | Leichhardt Oval | Ben Cummins, Chris Butler | 12,649 |
| St. George Illawarra Dragons | 26-12 | New Zealand Warriors | Sunday, 26 March, 6:30 pm | UOW Jubilee Oval | David Munro, Chris Sutton | 11,608 |

- Total Points Scored: 285

== Round 5 ==
| Home | Score | Away | Match Informations |
| Home | Score | Away | Date and Time (AEDT/AEST[Sun]) | Venue | Referee | Attendance |
|---|---|---|---|---|---|---|
| Canterbury-Bankstown Bulldogs | 10-7 | Brisbane Broncos | Thursday, 30 March, 8:05 pm | ANZ Stadium | Matt Cecchin, Chris James | 7,412 |
| Sydney Roosters | 12-18 | Manly-Warringah Sea Eagles | Friday, 31 March, 6:00 pm | Allianz Stadium | Ben Cummins, Chris Butler | 12,376 |
| North Queensland Cowboys | 20-6 | South Sydney Rabbitohs | Friday, 31 March, 8:05 pm | 1300SMILES Stadium | Gavin Badger, Jon Stone | 13,671 |
| Cronulla-Sutherland Sharks | 19-18 | Newcastle Knights | Saturday, 1 April, 3:00 pm | Southern Cross Group Stadium | Grant Atkins, Chris Sutton | 12,838 |
| Canberra Raiders | 30-18 | Parramatta Eels | Saturday, 1 April, 5:30 pm | GIO Stadium | Gerard Sutton, Alan Shortall | 17,653 |
| Melbourne Storm | 28-6 | Penrith Panthers | Saturday, 1 April, 7:30 pm | AAMI Park | Ashley Klein, Dave Munro | 15,223 |
| New Zealand Warriors | 28-22 | Gold Coast Titans | Sunday, 2 April, 2:00 pm | Mt Smart Stadium | Adam Gee, Gavin Reynolds | 10,263 |
| Wests Tigers | 6-28 | St. George Illawarra Dragons | Sunday, 2 April, 4:00 pm | ANZ Stadium | Henry Perenara, Matt Noyen | 13,172 |

- Total Points Scored: 276

== Round 6 ==
| Home | Score | Away | Match Information |
| Home | Score | Away | Date and Time (AEST) | Venue | Referee | Attendance |
|---|---|---|---|---|---|---|
| Brisbane Broncos | 32-8 | Sydney Roosters | Thursday, 6 April, 8:05 pm | Suncorp Stadium | Gerard Sutton, Alan Shortall | 30,376 |
| Newcastle Knights | 12-22 | Canterbury-Bankstown Bulldogs | Friday, 7 April, 6:00 pm | McDonald Jones Stadium | Adam Gee, Gavin Reynolds | 16,929 |
| Penrith Panthers | 20-21 | South Sydney Rabbitohs | Friday, 7 April, 7:20 pm | Pepper Stadium | Ben Cummins, Dave Munro | 15,535 |
| Manly-Warringah Sea Eagles | 10-35 | St. George Illawarra Dragons | Saturday, 8 April, 2:30 pm | Lottoland | Gavin Badger, Chris James | 11,654 |
| Gold Coast Titans | 16-42 | Canberra Raiders | Saturday, 8 April, 5:00 pm | Cbus Super Stadium | Ashley Klein, Chris Butler | 12,390 |
| North Queensland Cowboys | 16-26 | Wests Tigers | Saturday, 8 April, 8:00 pm | 1300SMILES Stadium | Grant Atkins, Chris Sutton | 15,424 |
| New Zealand Warriors | 22-10 | Parramatta Eels | Sunday, 9 April, 1:30 pm | Mt Smart Stadium | Henry Perenara, Matt Noyen | 13,526 |
| Melbourne Storm | 2-11 | Cronulla Sutherland Sharks | Sunday, 9 April, 3:30 pm | AAMI Park | Matt Cecchin, Gerard Sutton | 12,694 |

- Total Points Scored: 305

The Melbourne Storm were kept tryless against the Cronulla Sharks for the first time in Melbourne.

== Round 7 ==
| Home | Score | Away | Match Information |
| Home | Score | Away | Date and Time (AEST) | Venue | Referee | Attendance |
|---|---|---|---|---|---|---|
| Canterbury-Bankstown Bulldogs | 24-9 | South Sydney Rabbitohs | Friday, 14 April, 3:30 pm | ANZ Stadium | G. Atkins, C. Sutton | 35,984 |
| Newcastle Knights | 6-24 | Sydney Roosters | Friday, 14 April, 5:30 pm | McDonald Jones Stadium | M. Cecchin, A. Shortall | 21,412 |
| Brisbane Broncos | 24-22 | Gold Coast Titans | Friday, 14 April, 7:20 pm | Suncorp Stadium | G. Badger, C. James | 34,592 |
| Manly-Warringah Sea Eagles | 26-30 | Melbourne Storm | Saturday, 15 April, 2:30 pm | Lottoland | A. Gee, G. Reynolds | 10,144 |
| Canberra Raiders | 20-8 | New Zealand Warriors | Saturday, 15 April 2017 5:00 pm | GIO Stadium | A. Klein, C. Butler | 13,996 |
| St. George Illawarra Dragons | 28-22 | North Queensland Cowboys | Saturday, 15 April 2017 7:00 pm | WIN Stadium | H. Perenara, M. Noyen | 13,886 |
| Penrith Panthers | 2-28 | Cronulla-Sutherland Sharks | Sunday, 16 April 2017 3:30 pm | Pepper Stadium | G. Sutton, P. Gough | 15,780 |
| Parramatta Eels | 26-22 | Wests Tigers | Monday, 17 April 2017 3:30 pm | ANZ Stadium | B. Cummins, D. Munro | 28,249 |

The Parramatta Eels overcame a 12-point deficit with 10 minutes left to defeat Wests Tigers 26–22 breaking a 4-game losing streak.

== Round 8-ANZAC Round ==
| Home | Score | Away | Match Information |
| Home | Score | Away | Date and Time (AEST) | Venue | Referee | Attendance |
|---|---|---|---|---|---|---|
| Canberra Raiders | 18-20 (gp) | Manly-Warringah Sea Eagles | Friday, 21 April, 6:00 pm | GIO Stadium | G. Atkins, C. Sutton | 15,976 |
| South Sydney Rabbitohs | 24-25 | Brisbane Broncos | Friday, 21 April, 7:50 pm | ANZ Stadium | A. Klein, C. Butler | 11,083 |
| Parramatta Eels | 18-12 | Penrith Panthers | Saturday, 22 April, 3:00 pm | ANZ Stadium | H. Perenara, C. James | 14,070 |
| North Queensland Cowboys | 24-12 | Newcastle Knights | Saturday, 22 April, 5:30 pm | 1300SMILES Stadium | A. Gee, G. Reynolds | 13,678 |
| Cronulla-Sutherland Sharks | 12-16 | Gold Coast Titans | Saturday, 22 April, 7:30 pm | Shark Park | G. Badger, J. Stone | 12,397 |
| Wests Tigers | 18-12 | Canterbury-Bankstown Bulldogs | Sunday, 23 April, 4:00 pm | ANZ Stadium | G. Sutton, P. Gough | 19,303 |
| Sydney Roosters | 13-12 (gp) | St. George Illawarra Dragons | Tuesday, 25 April, 4:15 pm | Allianz Stadium | B. Cummins, D. Munro | 40,864 |
| Melbourne Storm | 20-14 | New Zealand Warriors | Tuesday, 25 April, 7:00 pm | AAMI Park | M. Cecchin, A. Shortall | 22,153 |

== Round 9 ==
| Home | Score | Away | Match Information |
| Home | Score | Away | Date and Time (AEST) | Venue | Referee | Attendance |
|---|---|---|---|---|---|---|
| Brisbane Broncos | 32-18 | Penrith Panthers | Thursday, 27 April, 7:50 pm | Suncorp Stadium | G. Sutton, P. Gough | 21,464 |
| South Sydney Rabbitohs | 8-46 | Manly-Warringah Sea Eagles | Friday, 28 April, 6:00 pm | Allianz Stadium | G. Badger, G. Reynolds | 10,594 |
| North Queensland Cowboys | 6-26 | Parramatta Eels | Friday, 28 April, 7:30 pm | 1300SMILES Stadium | G. Atkins, C. Sutton | 14,247 |
| Gold Coast Titans | 38-8 | Newcastle Knights | Saturday, 29 April, 3:00 pm | Cbus Super Stadium | D. Munro, A. Shortall | 10,511 |
| Canterbury-Bankstown Bulldogs | 16-10 | Canberra Raiders | Saturday, 29 April, 5:30 pm | ANZ Stadium | H. Perenara, C. James | 13,390 |
| Wests Tigers | 16-22 | Cronulla-Sutherland Sharks | Saturday, 29 April, 7:30 pm | Leichhardt Oval | B. Cummins, A. Gee | 13,405 |
| New Zealand Warriors | 14-13 | Sydney Roosters | Sunday, 30 April, 2:00 pm | MT Smart Stadium | A. Klein, J. Stone | 13,128 |
| St. George Illawarra Dragons | 22-34 | Melbourne Storm | Sunday, 30 April, 4:00 pm | WIN Stadium | M. Cecchin, C. Butler | 12,377 |

== Round 10 ==
| Home | Score | Away | Match Information |
| Home | Score | Away | Date and Time (AEST) | Venue | Referee | Attendance |
|---|---|---|---|---|---|---|
| Canterbury-Bankstown Bulldogs | 14-30 | North Queensland Cowboys | Thursday, 11 May, 7:50 pm | ANZ Stadium | Matt Cecchin, Adam Gee | 8,122 |
| St. George Illawarra Dragons | 14-18 | Cronulla-Sutherland Sharks | Friday, 12 May, 6:00 pm | UOW Jubilee Oval | Gerard Sutton, Chris Butler | 15,927 |
| Wests Tigers | 8-28 | South Sydney Rabbitohs | Friday, 12 May, 8:00 pm | ANZ Stadium | Henry Perenara, Chris James | 12,213 |
| Penrith Panthers | 36-28 | New Zealand Warriors | Saturday, 13 May, 3:00 pm | Pepper Stadium | Ben Cummins, Chris Sutton | 11,588 |
| Melbourne Storm | 36-38 | Gold Coast Titans | Saturday, 13 May, 5:30 pm | Suncorp Stadium | David Munro, Alan Shortal | 44,127 |
| Manly-Warringah Sea Eagles | 14-24 | Brisbane Broncos | Saturday, 13 May, 7:50 pm | Suncorp Stadium | Ashley Klein, Jon Stone | 44,127 |
| Newcastle Knights | 34-20 | Canberra Raiders | Sunday, 14 May, 2:00 pm | McDonald Jones Stadium | Gavin Badger, Peter Gough | 10,997 |
| Sydney Roosters | 48-10 | Parramatta Eels | Sunday, 14 May, 4:00 pm | Allianz Stadium | Grant Atkins, Gavin Reynolds | 10,467 |

- Melbourne's 36 points equalled the first grade record for highest losing scores
- The Melbourne v Gold Coast and Manly v Brisbane games were played as a double header.

== Round 11-Beanies for Brain Cancer Round ==
| Home | Score | Away | Match Information |
| Home | Score | Away | Date and Time (AEST) | Venue | Referee | Attendance |
|---|---|---|---|---|---|---|
| Cronulla-Sutherland Sharks | 18-14 | North Queensland Cowboys | Thursday, 18 May, 7:50 pm | Southern Cross Group Stadium | Ashley Klein, Alan Shortall | 8,557 |
| New Zealand Warriors | 14-30 | St George Illawarra Dragons | Friday, 19 May, 6:00 pm | FMG Stadium Waikato | Henry Peranara, Peter Gough | 11,108 |
| Brisbane Broncos | 36-0 | Wests Tigers | Friday, 19 May, 7:50 pm | Suncorp Stadium | Grant Atkins, Gavin Reynolds | 21,197 |
| Gold Coast Titans | 10-30 | Manly-Warringah Sea Eagles | Saturday, 20 May, 5:30 pm | Cbus Super Stadium | Matt Cecchin, Adam Gee | 12,509 |
| Parramatta Eels | 16-22 | Canberra Raiders | Saturday, 20 May, 7:30 pm | ANZ Stadium | Ben Cummins, Chris Sutton | 10,074 |
| Newcastle Knights | 20-30 | Penrith Panthers | Sunday, 21 May, 2:00 pm | McDonald Jones Stadium | David Munro, Chris James | 13,319 |
| Canterbury-Bankstown Bulldogs | 18-24 | Sydney Roosters | Sunday, 21 May, 4:00 pm | ANZ Stadium | Gerard Sutton, Alan Shortall | 15,090 |
| South Sydney Rabbitohs | 6-14 | Melbourne Storm | Sunday, 21 May, 6:30 pm | NIB Stadium | Gavin Badger, Jon Stone | 11,433 |

== Round 12 ==
| Home | Score | Away | Match Information |
| Home | Score | Away | Date and Time (AEST) | Venue | Referee | Attendance |
|---|---|---|---|---|---|---|
| South Sydney Rabbitohs | 16–22 | Parramatta Eels | Friday, 26 May, 7:50 pm | ANZ Stadium | Grant Atkins, Alan Shortall | 14,218 |
| New Zealand Warriors | 28-10 | Brisbane Broncos | Saturday, 27 May, 5:30 pm | Mt Smart Stadium | Adam Gee, Gavin Reynolds | 13,826 |
| Cronulla-Sutherland Sharks | 9-8 | Canterbury-Bankstown Bulldogs | Saturday, 27 May, 7:30 pm | Southern Cross Group Stadium | Ben Cummins, Gavin Badger | 20,497 |
| Canberra Raiders | 24-16 | Sydney Roosters | Sunday, 28 May, 4:00 pm | GIO Stadium | Henry Perenara, David Munro | 14,786 |
| North Queensland Cowboys | 7th-5th | St. George Illawarra Dragons | BYE |
| Newcastle Knights | 16th- 11th | Penrith Panthers | BYE |
| Manly-Warringah Sea Eagles | 6th- 1st | Melbourne Storm | BYE |
| Wests Tigers | 15th- 12th | Gold Coast Titans | BYE |

== Round 13 ==
| Home | Score | Away | Match Information |
| Home | Score | Away | Date and Time (AEST) | Venue | Referee | Attendance |
|---|---|---|---|---|---|---|
| Melbourne Storm | 40-12 | Newcastle Knights | Friday, 2 June, 6:00 pm | AAMI Park | Adam Gee, Gavin Reynolds | 11,070 |
| Parramatta Eels | 32-24 | New Zealand Warriors | Friday, 2 June, 7:50 pm | ANZ Stadium | Ashley Klein, Chris Sutton | 9,489 |
| St George Illawarra Dragons | 16-12 | Wests Tigers | Saturday, 3 June, 3:00 pm | ANZ Stadium | Gavin Badger, Peter Gough | 12,983 |
| Sydney Roosters | 18-16 | Brisbane Broncos | Saturday, 3 June, 5:30 pm | Allianz Stadium | Ben Cummins, David Munro | 12,236 |
| North Queensland Cowboys | 20-8 | Gold Coast Titans | Saturday, 3 June, 7:30 pm | 1300SMILES Stadium | Henry Perenara, Chris James | 14,612 |
| Manly-Warringah Sea Eagles | 21-20 | Canberra Raiders | Sunday, 4 June, 2:00 pm | Lottoland | Gerard Sutton, Chris Butler | 11,318 |
| Canterbury-Bankstown Bulldogs | 0-38 | Penrith Panthers | Sunday, 4 June, 4:00 pm | ANZ Stadium | Grant Atkins, Alan Shortall | 11,283 |
| South Sydney Rabbitohs | | Cronulla-Sutherland Sharks | BYE |

== Round 14 ==
| Home | Score | Away | Match Information |
| Home | Score | Away | Date and Time (AEST) | Venue | Referee | Attendance |
|---|---|---|---|---|---|---|
| Cronulla-Sutherland Sharks | 13-18 | Melbourne Storm | Thursday, 8 June, 7:50 pm | Southern Cross Group Stadium | Matt Cecchin, Gavin Badger | 7,912 |
| Manly-Warringah Sea Eagles | 18-14 | Newcastle Knights | Friday, 9 June, 6:00 pm | Lottoland | Ashley Klein, Jon Stone | 4,189 |
| Brisbane Broncos | 24-18 | South Sydney Rabbitohs | Friday, 9 June, 7:50 pm | Suncorp Stadium | Gerard Sutton, Peter Gough | 30,578 |
| Gold Coast Titans | 12-34 | New Zealand Warriors | Saturday, 10 June, 3:00 pm | Cbus Super Stadium | David Munro, Chris Sutton | 14,067 |
| Penrith Panthers | 24-20 | Canberra Raiders | Saturday, 10 June, 5:30 pm | Carrington Park | Henry Perenara, Chris James | 8,730 |
| Parramatta Eels | 6-32 | North Queensland Cowboys | Saturday, 10 June, 7:30 pm | TIO Stadium | Adam Gee, Gavin Reynolds | 11,968 |
| Wests Tigers | 18-40 | Sydney Roosters | Sunday, 11 June, 4:00 pm | Campbelltown Stadium | Grant Atkins, Alan Shortall | 10,066 |
| Canterbury-Bankstown Bulldogs | 16-2 | St George Illawarra Dragons | Monday, 12 June, 4:00 pm | ANZ Stadium | Ben Cummins, Gavin Badger | 24,083 |

After being down 20–12 with less than 2mins left, the Panthers scored and converted 2 tries to steal a victory from the Canberra Raiders.

== Round 15 ==
| Home | Score | Away | Match Information |
| Home | Score | Away | Date and Time (AEST) | Venue | Referee | Attendance |
|---|---|---|---|---|---|---|
| South Sydney Rabbitohs | 36-20 | Gold Coast Titans | Friday, 16 June, 7:50 pm | ANZ Stadium | Ashley Klein, Alan Shortall | 7,163 |
| Melbourne Storm | 23-22 | North Queensland Cowboys | Saturday, 17 June, 5:30 pm | AAMI Park | Ben Cummins, Adam Gee | 17,124 |
| Cronulla-Sutherland Sharks | 24-22 | Wests Tigers | Saturday, 17 June, 7:30 pm | Southern Cross Group Stadium | Henry Perenara, David Munro | 11,695 |
| Parramatta Eels | 24-10 | St George Illawarra Dragons | Sunday, 18 June, 4:00 pm | ANZ Stadium | Grant Atkins, Chris Sutton | 13,559 |
| Brisbane Broncos | | Canterbury-Bankstown Bulldogs | BYE |
| Newcastle Knights | | Penrith Panthers | BYE |
| Canberra Raiders | | Sydney Roosters | BYE |
| Manly-Warringah Sea Eagles | | New Zealand Warriors | BYE |

== Round 16 ==
| Home | Score | Away | Match Information |
| Home | Score | Away | Date and Time (AEST) | Venue | Referee | Attendance |
|---|---|---|---|---|---|---|
| New Zealand Warriors | 21-14 | Canterbury-Bankstown Bulldogs | Friday, 23 June, 6:00 pm | Mt Smart Stadium | Ashley Klein, Peter Gough | 13,476 |
| Wests Tigers | 14-26 | Gold Coast Titans | Friday, 23 June, 7:50 pm | Campbelltown Stadium | Gavin Badger, Jon Stone | 6,891 |
| North Queensland Cowboys | 14-12 | Penrith Panthers | Saturday, 24 June, 3:00 pm | 1300SMILES Stadium | Grant Atkins, Chris Sutton | 17,876 |
| Canberra Raiders | 20-30 | Brisbane Broncos | Saturday, 24 June, 5:30 pm | GIO Stadium | Henry Perenara, David Munro | 15,652 |
| Sydney Roosters | 25-24 | Melbourne Storm | Saturday, 24 June, 7:30 pm | Adelaide Oval | Matt Cecchin, Alan Shortall | 21,492 |
| St George Illawarra Dragons | 32-28 | Newcastle Knights | Sunday, 25 June, 2:00 pm | UOW Jubilee Oval | Adam Gee, Gavin Reynolds | 10,174 |
| Cronulla-Sutherland Sharks | 18-35 | Manly-Warringah Sea Eagles | Sunday, 25 June, 4:00 pm | Southern Cross Group Stadium | Ben Cummins, Chris Butler | 14,766 |
| Parramatta Eels | | South Sydney Rabbitohs | BYE |

== Round 17 ==
| Home | Score | Away | Match Information |
| Home | Score | Away | Date and Time (AEST) | Venue | Referee | Attendance |
|---|---|---|---|---|---|---|
| Parramatta Eels | 13–12 | Canterbury-Bankstown Bulldogs | Thursday, 29 June, 7:50 pm | ANZ Stadium | Henry Perenara, David Munro | 14,061 |
| Gold Coast Titans | 20–10 | St George Illawarra Dragons | Friday, 30 June, 6:00 pm | Cbus Super Stadium | Grant Atkins, Chris Sutton | 13,140 |
| Brisbane Broncos | 12-42 | Melbourne Storm | Friday, 30 June, 7:50 pm | Suncorp Stadium | Ashley Klein, Adam Gee | 41,741 |
| Sydney Roosters | 12-44 | Cronulla-Sutherland Sharks | Saturday, 1 July, 3:00 pm | Central Coast Stadium | Gerard Sutton, Chris James | 20,060 |
| Manly-Warringah Sea Eagles | 26-22 | New Zealand Warriors | Saturday, 1 July, 5:30 pm | nib Stadium | Gavin Badger, Tim Roby | 6,258 |
| Canberra Raiders | 18-31 | North Queensland Cowboys | Saturday, 1 July, 7:30 pm | GIO Stadium | Ben Cummins, Peter Gough | 10,266 |
| Newcastle Knights | 12-33 | Wests Tigers | Sunday, 2 July, 2:00 pm | McDonald Jones Stadium | Gavin Reynolds, Alan Shortall | 19,531 |
| South Sydney | 42-14 | Penrith Panthers | Sunday, 2 July, 4:00 pm | ANZ Stadium | Matt Cecchin, Jon Stone | 14,103 |

The Cronulla Sharks were the first team in 2017 to have a perfect completion rate at half-time with 19/19 against the Sydney Roosters.

== Round 18 ==
| Home | Score | Away | Match Information |
| Home | Score | Away | Date and Time (AEST) | Venue | Referee | Attendance |
|---|---|---|---|---|---|---|
| Sydney Roosters | 14-12 | South Sydney | Friday 7 July, 7:50 pm | Allianz Stadium | Ashley Klein | 16,245 |
| Penrith Panthers | 16-8 | Manly-Warringah Sea Eagles | Saturday 8 July, 5:30 pm | Pepper Stadium | Henry Perenara | 14,625 |
| Melbourne Storm | 6-22 | Parramatta Eels | Saturday 8 July, 7:30 pm | AAMI Park | Gavin Badger | 13,593 |
| Canterbury-Bankstown Bulldogs | 20-18 | Newcastle Knights | Sunday 9 July, 4:00 pm | Belmore Sports Ground | Ben Cummins, Gavin Reynolds | 13,103 |
| Brisbane Broncos | | North Queensland Cowboys | BYE |
| St. George Illawarra Dragons | | Canberra Raiders | BYE |
| Cronulla-Sutherland Sharks | | Wests Tigers | BYE |
| Gold Coast Titans | | New Zealand Warriors | BYE |

The Bulldogs scored 12 points in 5 minutes to comeback from an 8-18 deficit after 75mins.

== Round 19 ==
| Home | Score | Away | Match Information |
| Home | Score | Away | Date and Time (AEST) | Venue | Referee | Attendance |
|---|---|---|---|---|---|---|
| New Zealand Warriors | 22-34 | Penrith Panthers | Friday 14 July, 10:00 pm | Manu Vatuvei Stadium | Grant Atkins, Chris Sutton | 13,076 |
| Canberra Raiders | 18-14 | St George Illawarra Dragons | Friday 14 July, 8:00 pm | GIO Stadium | Gavin Reynolds, Alan Shortall | 10,977 |
| Newcastle Knights | 22-34 | Brisbane Broncos | Saturday, 15 July, 5:30 pm | McDonald Jones Stadium | Adam Gee, Chris James | 13,773 |
| Gold Coast Titans | 30-10 | Cronulla-Sutherland Sharks | Saturday 15 July, 7:30 pm | Cbus Super Stadium | Ashley Klein, David Munro | 14,333 |
| Manly-Warringah Sea Eagles | 28-16 | Wests Tigers | Sunday 16 July, 2:00 pm | Lottoland | Gerard Sutton, Tim Roby | 14,128 |
| South Sydney | 10-23 | North Queensland Cowboys | Sunday 16 July, 4:00 pm | Barlow Park | Gavin Badger, Jon Stone | 11,217 |
| Canterbury-Bankstown Bulldogs | | Parramatta Eels | BYE |
| Sydney Roosters | | Melbourne Storm | BYE |

Mt Smart Stadium was renamed Manu Vatuvei Stadium for the weekend in honour of retiring player Manu Vatuvei.

== Round 20-Women in League Round ==
| Home | Score | Away | Match Information |
| Home | Score | Away | Date and Time (AEST) | Venue | Referee | Attendance |
|---|---|---|---|---|---|---|
| Brisbane Broncos | 42-12 | Canterbury-Bankstown Bulldogs | Thursday, 20 July, 7:50 pm | Suncorp Stadium | Grant Atkins, Chris Sutton | 24,267 |
| Sydney Roosters | 28-4 | Newcastle Knights | Friday, 21 July 2017, 7:50 pm | Allianz Stadium | Gavin Reynolds, Chris James | 7,121 |
| Cronulla-Sutherland Sharks | 26-12 | South Sydney Rabbitohs | Friday, 21 July, 6:00 pm | Southern Cross Group Stadium | Adam Gee, Chris Sutton | 12,123 |
| Penrith Panthers | 24-16 | Gold Coast Titans | Saturday, 22 July, 3:00 pm | Pepper Stadium | Gavin Badger, Jon Stone | 11,480 |
| Canberra Raiders | 14-20 | Melbourne Storm | Saturday, 22 July, 5:30 pm | GIO Stadium | Matt Cecchin, Chris Butler | 14,115 |
| North Queensland Cowboys | 24-12 | New Zealand Warriors | Saturday, 22 July, 7:30 pm | 1300SMILES Stadium | Henry Perenara, Tim Roby | 16,080 |
| St George Illawarra Dragons | 52-22 | Manly-Warringah Sea Eagles | Sunday, 23 July, 2:00 pm | WIN Stadium | Ashley Klein, Alan Shortall | 16,883 |
| Wests Tigers | 16-17 | Parramatta Eels | Sunday, 23 July, 4:00 pm | ANZ Stadium | Adam Gee, Chris Sutton | 30,901 |

== Round 21 ==
| Home | Score | Away | Match Information |
| Home | Score | Away | Date and Time (AEST) | Venue | Referee | Attendance |
|---|---|---|---|---|---|---|
| Penrith Panthers | 16-8 | Canterbury-Bankstown Bulldogs | Thursday 27 July, 7:30 pm | Pepper Stadium | Ben Cummins, David Munro | 8,727 |
| New Zealand Warriors | 12-26 | Cronulla-Sutherland Sharks | Friday 28 July, 8:00 pm | Mt Smart Stadium | Matt Cecchin, Gavin Reynolds | 9,771 |
| Parramatta Eels | 28-14 | Brisbane Broncos | Friday 28 July, 7:50 pm | ANZ Stadium | Ashley Klein, Alan Shortall | 12,182 |
| Newcastle Knights | 21-14 | St George Illawarra Dragons | Saturday 29 July, 3:00 pm | McDonald Jones Stadium | Gavin Badger, Ziggy Przeklasa-Adamski | 15,031 |
| South Sydney Rabbitohs | 18-32 | Canberra Raiders | Saturday 29 July, 5:30 pm | ANZ Stadium | Henry Perenara, Jon Stone | 9,112 |
| Sydney Roosters | 22-16 | North Queensland Cowboys | Saturday 29 July, 7:30 pm | Allianz Stadium | Grant Atkins, Chris Sutton | 9,476 |
| Melbourne Storm | 40-6 | Manly-Warringah Sea Eagles | Sunday 30 July, 2:00 pm | AAMI Park | Gerard Sutton, Tim Roby | 15,036 |
| Gold Coast Titans | 4-26 | Wests Tigers | Sunday 30 July, 4:00 pm | Cbus Super Stadium | Adam Gee, Chris James | 11,516 |

== Round 22-Retro Round ==
| Home | Score | Away | Match Information |
| Home | Score | Away | Date and Time (AEST) | Venue | Referee | Attendance |
|---|---|---|---|---|---|---|
| Canterbury-Bankstown Bulldogs | 4-20 | Parramatta Eels | Thursday, 3 August, 7:50 pm | ANZ Stadium | Grant Atkins, Gavin Reynolds | 12,137 |
| St George Illawarra Dragons | 24-26 | South Sydney Rabbitohs | Friday 4 August, 6:00 pm | Sydney Cricket Ground | Ben Cummins, David Munro | 12, 312 |
| North Queensland Cowboys | 8-26 | Melbourne Storm | Friday 4 August, 7:50 pm | 1300 SMILES Stadium | Ashley Klein, Alan Shortall | 21, 380 |
| Newcastle Knights | 26-10 | New Zealand Warriors | Saturday 5 August, 3:00 pm | McDonald Jones Stadium | Chris Sutton, Chris James | 11, 824 |
| Gold Coast Titans | 0-54 | Brisbane Broncos | Saturday 5 August, 5:30 pm | Cbus Super Stadium | Henry Parenara, Jon Stone | 21, 716 |
| Cronulla-Sutherland Sharks | 12-30 | Canberra Raiders | Saturday 5 August, 7:30 pm | Southern Cross Group Stadium | Gerard Sutton, Adam Gee | 11, 639 |
| Manly-Warringah Sea Eagles | 36-18 | Sydney Roosters | Sunday 6 August, 2:00 pm | Lottoland | Matt Cecchin, Grant Atkins | 14,564 |
| Penrith Panthers | 28-14 | Wests Tigers | Sunday 6 August, 4:00 pm | Pepper Stadium | Gavin Badger, Ziggy Przeklasa-Adamski | 15,780 |

- The Knights won back to back games for the first time since 2015 while their opponents, the New Zealand Warriors, lost 5 games in a row for the first time since 2015.
- The Penrith Vs Wests match marked the 300th match that Gavin Badger refereed becoming only the fifth NRL referee to reach this milestone.
- Also the Penrith Vs Wests tigers match was the first match since early in the 1990s where a father (Ivan Cleary) coached up against his son (Nathan).

== Round 23 ==
| Home | Score | Away | Match Information |
| Home | Score | Away | Date and Time (AEST) | Venue | Referee | Attendance |
|---|---|---|---|---|---|---|
| South Sydney Rabbitohs | 28-14 | Canterbury-Bankstown Bulldogs | Thursday 10 August, 7:50 pm | ANZ Stadium | Gavin Badger, Gavin Reynolds | 8,247 |
| Parramatta Eels | 10-29 | Newcastle Knights | Friday 11 August, 6:00 pm | ANZ Stadium | Henry Perenara, Chris Butler | 13,141 |
| Brisbane Broncos | 32-10 | Cronulla-Sutherland Sharks | Friday 11 August, 7:50 pm | Suncorp Stadium | Ben Cummins, Chris Sutton | 34,552 |
| St George Illawarra Dragons | 42-16 | Gold Coast Titans | Saturday 12 August, 3:00 pm | UOW Jubilee Oval | Ashley Klein, Ziggy Przeklasa-Adamski | 8,973 |
| Melbourne Storm | 16-13 | Sydney Roosters | Saturday 12 August, 5:30 pm | AAMI Park | Gerard Sutton, David Munro | 17,221 |
| Penrith Panthers | 24-16 | North Queensland Cowboys | Saturday 12 August, 7:30 pm | Pepper Stadium | Matt Cecchin, Alan Shortall | 12,357 |
| New Zealand Warriors | 16-36 | Canberra Raiders | Sunday 13 August, 2:00 pm | Mt Smart Stadium | Adam Gee, Gavin Reynolds | 10,182 |
| Wests Tigers | 30-26 | Manly-Warringah Sea Eagles | Sunday 13 August, 4:00 pm | Leichhardt Oval | Grant Atkins, Chris James | 12,208 |

The Knights won their first away game since Round 24, 2015.

== Round 24 ==
| Home | Score | Away | Match Information |
| Home | Score | Away | Date and Time (AEST) | Venue | Referee | Attendance |
|---|---|---|---|---|---|---|
| Parramatta Eels | 30-8 | Gold Coast Titans | Thursday, August 17, 7:50 pm | ANZ Stadium | Grant Atkins, Gavin Badger | 6,826 |
| South Sydney | 36-18 | New Zealand Warriors | Friday 18 August, 6:00 pm | ANZ Stadium | Chris Sutton, Chris Butler | 6,213 |
| Brisbane Broncos | 24-12 | St George Illawarra Dragons | Friday 18 August, 7:50 pm | Suncorp Stadium | Matt Cecchin, Gavin Reynolds | 31,832 |
| Newcastle Knights | 12-44 | Melbourne Storm | Saturday 19 August, 3:00 pm | McDonald Jones Stadium | Adam Gee, Jon Stone | 16,001 |
| Sydney Roosters | 22-18 | Wests Tigers | Saturday 19 August, 5:30 pm | Allianz Stadium | Henry Perenara, Chris James | 9,585 |
| North Queensland Cowboys | 16-26 | Cronulla-Sutherland Sharks | Saturday 19 August, 7:30 pm | 1300 Smiles Stadium | Gerard Sutton, David Munro | 15,535 |
| Canberra Raiders | 22-26 | Penrith Panthers | Sunday 20 August, 2:00 pm | GIO Stadium | Ashley Klein, Alan Shortall | 14,818 |
| Canterbury-Bankstown Bulldogs | 30-16 | Manly-Warringah Sea Eagles | Sunday 20 August, 4:00 pm | ANZ Stadium | Ben Cummins, Gavin Badger | 8,912 |

== Round 25 ==
| Home | Score | Away | Match Information |
| Home | Score | Away | Date and Time (AEST) | Venue | Referee | Attendance |
|---|---|---|---|---|---|---|
| Brisbane Broncos | 34-52 | Parramatta Eels | Thursday 24 August, 7:50 pm | Suncorp Stadium | Ashley Klein, Adam Gee | 29,058 |
| Canberra Raiders | 46-28 | Newcastle Knights | Friday 25 August, 6:00 pm | GIO Stadium | Grant Aitkens, Chris Butler | 10,523 |
| Wests Tigers | 14-22 | North Queensland Cowboys | Friday 25 August, 7:50 pm | Campbelltown Stadium | Ben Cummins, Chris Sutton | 9,346 |
| Gold Coast Titans | 14-26 | Canterbury-Bankstown Bulldogs | Saturday 26 August, 3:00 pm | Cbus Super Stadium | Gavin Reynolds, Chris James | 10,887 |
| Melbourne Storm | 64-6 | South Sydney | Saturday 26 August, 5:30 pm | AAMI Park | Henry Parenara, Jon Stone | 15,403 |
| Cronulla-Sutherland Sharks | 14-16 | Sydney Roosters | Saturday 26 August, 7:30 pm | Southern Cross Group Stadium | Matt Checchin, Alan Shortall | 17,268 |
| New Zealand Warriors | 21-22 | Manly-Warringah Sea Eagles | Sunday 27 August, 2:00 pm | Mt Smart Stadium | Gavin Badger, Chris Sutton | 9,167 |
| Penrith Panthers | 14–16 | St George Illawarra Dragons | Sunday 27 August, 4:00 pm | Pepper Stadium | Gerard Sutton, Ben Cummins | 18,848 |

== Round 26 ==
| Home | Score | Away | Match Information |
| Home | Score | Away | Date and Time (AEST) | Venue | Referee | Attendance |
|---|---|---|---|---|---|---|
| North Queensland Cowboys | 10-20 | Brisbane Broncos | Thursday 31 August, 7:50 pm | 1300 Smiles Stadium | Gerard Sutton, Adam Gee | 23,321 |
| Parramatta Eels | 22-16 | South Sydney | Friday 1 September, 7:50 pm | ANZ Stadium | Gavin Badger, Chris Butler | 21,533 |
| Sydney Roosters | 20 - 16 | Gold Coast Titans | Saturday 2 September, 3:00 pm | Allianz Stadium | Ben Cummins, Matt Neyon | 11,212 |
| Manly-Warringah Sea Eagles | 28 - 12 | Penrith Panthers | Saturday 2 September, 5:30 pm | Lottoland | Matt Checchin, Alan Shortall | 14,423 |
| Melbourne Storm | 32 - 6 | Canberra Raiders | Saturday 2 September, 7:30 pm | AAMI Park | Grant Atkins, David Munro | 20,508 |
| Newcastle Knights | 18 - 26 | Cronulla-Sutherland Sharks | Sunday 3 September, 2:00 pm | McDonald Jones Stadium | Henry Perenara, Jon Stone | 20,535 |
| St George Illawarra Dragons | 20 - 26 | Canterbury-Bankstown Bulldogs | Sunday 3 September, 4:00 pm | ANZ Stadium | Ashley Klein, Chris Sutton | 21,582 |
| Wests Tigers | 28 - 16 | New Zealand Warriors | Sunday 3 September, 6:30 pm | Leichhardt Oval | Adam Gee, Peter Grough | 10,231 |

== Ladder ==
| Pos | Team | Pld | W | D | L | B | PF | PA | PD | Pts |
|---|---|---|---|---|---|---|---|---|---|---|
| 1 | Melbourne Storm | 24 | 20 | 0 | 4 | 2 | 633 | 336 | 297 | 44 |
| 2 | Sydney Roosters | 24 | 17 | 0 | 7 | 2 | 500 | 428 | 72 | 38 |
| 3 | Brisbane Broncos | 24 | 16 | 0 | 8 | 2 | 597 | 433 | 164 | 36 |
| 4 | Parramatta Eels | 24 | 16 | 0 | 8 | 2 | 496 | 457 | 39 | 36 |
| 5 | Cronulla-Sutherland Sharks | 24 | 15 | 0 | 9 | 2 | 476 | 407 | 69 | 34 |
| 6 | Manly-Warringah Sea Eagles | 24 | 14 | 0 | 10 | 2 | 552 | 512 | 40 | 32 |
| 7 | Penrith Panthers | 24 | 13 | 0 | 11 | 2 | 504 | 459 | 45 | 30 |
| 8 | North Queensland Cowboys | 24 | 13 | 0 | 11 | 2 | 467 | 443 | 24 | 30 |
| 9 | St. George Illawarra Dragons | 24 | 12 | 0 | 12 | 2 | 533 | 450 | 83 | 28 |
| 10 | Canberra Raiders | 24 | 11 | 0 | 13 | 2 | 558 | 487 | 61 | 26 |
| 11 | Canterbury-Bankstown Bulldogs | 24 | 10 | 0 | 14 | 2 | 360 | 455 | -95 | 24 |
| 12 | South Sydney Rabbitohs | 24 | 9 | 0 | 15 | 2 | 464 | 564 | -100 | 22 |
| 13 | New Zealand Warriors | 24 | 7 | 0 | 17 | 2 | 444 | 575 | -131 | 18 |
| 14 | Wests Tigers | 24 | 7 | 0 | 17 | 2 | 413 | 571 | -158 | 18 |
| 15 | Gold Coast Titans | 24 | 7 | 0 | 17 | 2 | 448 | 638 | -190 | 18 |
| 16 | Newcastle Knights | 24 | 5 | 0 | 19 | 2 | 426 | 648 | -220 | 14 |

- Teams highlighted in green have qualified for the finals
- The team highlighted in blue has clinched the minor premiership
- The team highlighted in red has clinched the wooden spoon

== Finals Series ==
Qualifying and elimination finals
9 September – Melbourne
1 | Melbourne Storm | 18
4 | Parramatta Eels | 16
10 September – Sydney
5 | Cronulla-Sutherland Sharks | 14
8 | North Queensland Cowboys | 15
9 September – Sydney
6 | Manly-Warringah Sea Eagles | 10
7 | Penrith Panthers | 22
8 September – Sydney
2 | Sydney Roosters | 24
3 | Brisbane Broncos | 22

Semi-finals
16 September – Sydney
Parramatta Eels | 16
North Queensland Cowboys | 24
15 September – Brisbane
Brisbane Broncos | 13
Penrith Panthers | 6

Preliminary finals
22 September – Melbourne
Melbourne Storm | 30
Brisbane Broncos | 0
23 September – Sydney
Sydney Roosters | 16
North Queensland Cowboys | 29

Grand final
1 October – Sydney
Melbourne Storm | 34
North Queensland Cowboys | 6

| Home | Score | Away | Match Information |
| Home | Score | Away | Date and Time (Local) | Venue (Broadcaster) | Referees | Attendance Capacity |
|---|---|---|---|---|---|---|
QUALIFYING & ELIMINATION FINALS
| Sydney Roosters | 24 – 22 | Brisbane Broncos | Friday, 8 September 7:55 pm | Allianz Stadium (Nine Network) | Matt Cecchin Alan Shortall | 21,212/ 45,500 |
| Melbourne Storm | 18 – 16 | Parramatta Eels | Saturday, 9 September 4:10 pm | AAMI Park (Nine Network) | Ben Cummins Chris Sutton | 22,626/ 30,050 |
| Manly-Warringah Sea Eagles | 10 – 22 | Penrith Panthers | Saturday, 9 September 7:40 pm | Allianz Stadium (Nine Network) | Gerard Sutton Adam Gee | 15,408/ 45,500 |
| Cronulla-Sutherland Sharks | 14 – 15 | North Queensland Cowboys | Sunday, 10 September 4:10 pm | Allianz Stadium (Nine Network) | Ashley Klein Gavin Badger | 16,115/ 45,500 |
SEMI FINALS
| Brisbane Broncos | 13 – 6 | Penrith Panthers | Friday, 15 September 8:00 pm | Suncorp Stadium (Nine Network) | Gerard Sutton Adam Gee | 38,623/ 52,500 |
| Parramatta Eels | 16 – 24 | North Queensland Cowboys | Saturday, 16 September 7:45 pm | ANZ Stadium (Nine Network) | Matt Cecchin Ben Cummins | 41,287/ 83,625 |
PRELIMINARY FINALS
| Melbourne Storm | 30 – 0 | Brisbane Broncos | Friday, 22 September 8:00 pm | AAMI Park (Nine Network) | Matt Cecchin Ben Cummins | 28,821/ 30,050 |
| Sydney Roosters | 16 – 29 | North Queensland Cowboys | Saturday, 23 September 7:45 pm | Allianz Stadium (Nine Network) | Gerard Sutton Adam Gee | 28,908/ 45,500 |
GRAND FINAL
| Melbourne Storm | 34 – 6 | North Queensland Cowboys | Sunday, 1 October 7:30 pm | ANZ Stadium (Nine Network) | Matt Cecchin Gerard Sutton | 79,722/ 83,500 |
