= Peter Dwyer =

Australian anthropologist

Peter D. Dwyer (born 1937, New Zealand) is an anthropologist and zoologist. He is an honorary research fellow at the University of Melbourne in Australia. He was Reader in Zoology at the University of Queensland, retiring in 1997.

== Contributions ==
As a zoologist trained at Victoria University of Wellington (BSc, MSc) and the University of New England in Armidale, Australia (PhD) he is credited for first documenting the endangered New Zealand Greater Short-tailed Bat. He worked on bats in New Zealand from 1959, then in Queensland and Papua New Guinea studying bats, Bower Birds, mammals, and local peoples' taxonomies.

Increasingly interested in human ecology and anthropology, he conducted fieldwork at different times between the 1970s and 2014 with highland and interior lowland people in Papua New Guinea: Kubo, Febi, Konai and Bedamuni. Initially focusing on documentation of land use and agriculture, and social change, his most recent project with Monica Minnegal examined the social changes resulting from the large Papua New Guinea Liquefied Natural Gas Project.

Over a decade of fieldwork with fisherfolk in Lakes Entrance, Victoria revealed their performance, skill, and negotiation of risk.

== Publications ==
- Dwyer, P.D. 1990. The Pigs That Ate the Garden: A Human Ecology from Papua New Guinea. University of Michigan Press. ISBN 0472101579
- Minnegal, M. and P.D. Dwyer. 2017. Navigating the Future: An Ethnography of Change in Papua New Guinea. Canberra: ANU Press. ISBN 9781760461249
- 140 articles and chapters
