= Belmore Sports Ground =

Football field in Belmore, Sydney, New South Wales, Australia

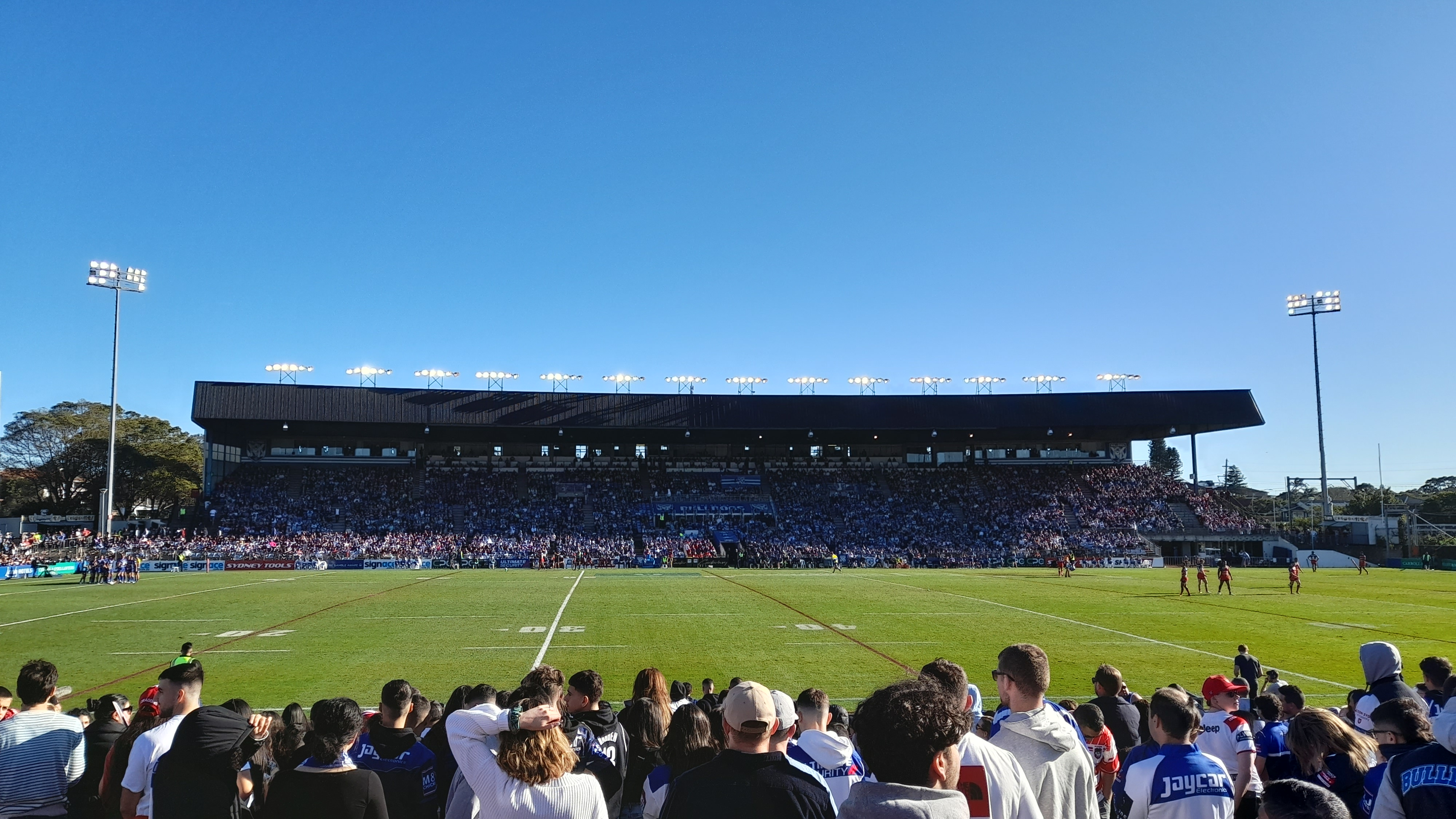
- Belmore Sports Ground in 2022
- Interactive map of Belmore Sports Ground
- Former names: Belmore Oval
- Location: Belmore, New South Wales, Australia
- Coordinates: 33°55′0″S 151°5′41″E
- Owner: City of Canterbury Bankstown
- Capacity: 17,000
- Surface: Grass
- Record attendance: 27,804

Construction
- Opened: 1920

Tenants
- Sydney Olympic (NPL NSW) (1996–2001, 2004–present); Canterbury-Bankstown Bulldogs (NSWRL/ARL/NRL) (SL) (1935–1994, 1996–1998, 2015–present)

Belmore Sports Ground is a stadium located in the Sydney suburb of Belmore. It is primarily used for rugby league and soccer as a home ground of the Canterbury-Bankstown Bulldogs in the National Rugby League (NRL) and Sydney Olympic FC in the National Premier Leagues NSW Men's.

The stadium was built in 1920, since then the stadium has been upgraded and redeveloped numerous times with it today hosting a total capacity of 19,000 spectators, with its grandstand hosting 10,000 spectators. The stadium is owned and operated by the City of Canterbury Bankstown council, where it is located.

== History ==
In 1920, the local council took steps to acquire park areas around the Belmore area. The park was named after the suburb it was located: Belmore Park. Belmore Park was eventually purchased in three sections between 1918 and 1921. The first two parcels were purchased by the State government and the third by Council. The park was opened around the early 1920s, the land was formerly known as Gunn's Paddock. In 1936, council purchased a large stand from the Sydney Cricket Ground and had it re-erected at the park as part of unemployment relief works. This stand was opened on 14 March 1936 by Mayor SE Parry and was named after him. Around 1967, council moved other sports played at the park to grounds elsewhere and rugby league was given priority.

== Ground Use ==
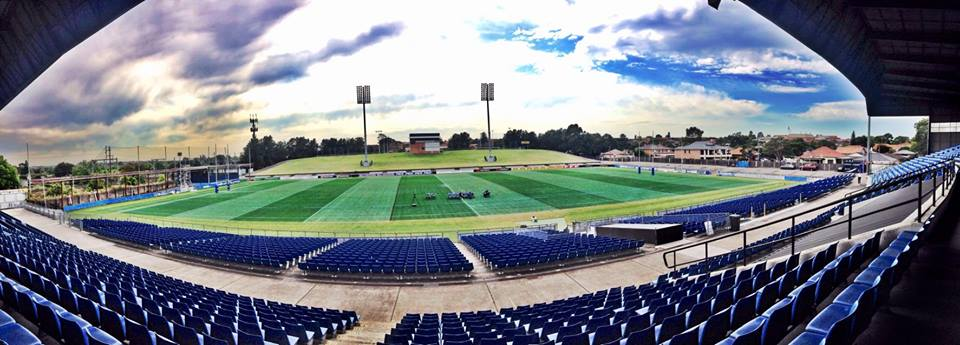
Inside the main grandstand at Belmore Sports Ground

=== Soccer ===
The ground is currently (and mainly) used for soccer as the home ground for former Australian National League club Sydney Olympic FC, which now competes in the New South Wales Premier League.

Sydney Olympic competed in the ground from 1977 to 2001 during the National Soccer League. In 2001 they left the ground to join Endeavour Field. Once the league ceased in mid-2004, the team returned to Belmore where they currently compete.

In 2021, the ground hosted a Round of 32 Australia Cup game between Sydney Olympic and A-League side Sydney FC with Sydney FC winning 4–2.

=== Rugby league ===
The Canterbury-Bankstown Bulldogs NRL team played their home games at Belmore Sports Ground from 1936 until 1998, after which time the club moved its home games to a series of more modern stadiums (currently Accor Stadium at Sydney Olympic Park). The club still used Belmore for training and administration, but subsequently moved these functions to a facility at Olympic Park in early 2008, leaving the club with no connection to the Sports Ground for the first time since the 1930s. However, the club subsequently announced its intention to redevelop the facilities at Belmore and move training and administration back to the ground. The Canterbury-Bankstown club relocated their offices and resumed training at the ground. In 2011, Canterbury's NSW Cup, SG Ball and Harold Matthews teams began playing most home games at Belmore once again.

The spectators' hill on the eastern side of the ground is named after Canterbury legend Terry Lamb.

From 1982 until the end of 1985, Canterbury's arch-rivals the Parramatta Eels used the ground as their temporary home ground while Parramatta Stadium was under construction. The St. George Dragons also used the ground for one season in 1988 while Kogarah Oval was re-developed.

Canterbury-Bankstown returned to playing NRL games at Belmore with two home games during the 2015 NRL season against Melbourne and Cronulla as part of its 80th anniversary celebrations. Canterbury-Bankstown played the premiers, North Queensland Cowboys, and Canberra Raiders in the 2016 season at Belmore Sports Ground. The match against the Cowboys was notable as it marked a homecoming for their co-captain, Johnathan Thurston, who debuted with the Bulldogs in 2002 and was part of their 2004 premiership team.

In 2016, it held an International rugby league match between the Cook Islands and Lebanon.

At the end of the 2016 NRL season, Belmore Sports Ground will have hosted 661 games of first grade rugby league since the first game on 13 April 1936. Of the active and semi-active grounds used by the NRL, only the SCG, Leichhardt Oval and Brookvale Oval have hosted more games.

In 2023, the ground hosted its first NRLW matches with the Newcastle Knights taking on the North Queensland Cowboys in the first game, followed by the Wests Tigers taking on the Cronulla-Sutherland Sharks in the second game.

==== Back to Belmore ====
===== NRL pre-season trials =====
Home	Score	Away	Match Information
Home	Score	Away	Date	Venue & Crowd	Match
Canterbury-Bankstown Bulldogs	28–16	Sydney Roosters	5:00pm, Sunday, 12 February 2012	Belmore Oval (12,000)	Back to Belmore 1
Canterbury-Bankstown Bulldogs	36–14	Newtown Jets	5:00pm, Sunday, 10 February 2013	Belmore Oval (12,000)	Back to Belmore 2
Canterbury-Bankstown Bulldogs	20–28	South Sydney Rabbitohs	5:00pm, Sunday, 9 February 2014	Belmore Oval (5,913)	Back to Belmore 3
Canterbury-Bankstown Bulldogs	20–0	Melbourne Storm	5:00pm Saturday, 20 February 2016	Belmore Oval
Canterbury-Bankstown Bulldogs	10–20	Penrith Panthers	6:00pm Saturday, 11 February 2017	Belmore Oval
Canterbury-Bankstown Bulldogs	24–10	Penrith Panthers	6:30pm Saturday, 24 February 2018	Belmore Oval
Wests Tigers	36–4	Canberra Raiders	2:55pm Sunday, 19 February 2023	Belmore Oval (7,801)	2023 NRL pre-season
Canterbury-Bankstown Bulldogs	16–36	Cronulla-Sutherland Sharks	5:00pm Sunday; 19 February 2023	Belmore Oval (7,801)	2023 NRL pre-season
Canterbury-Bankstown Bulldogs		Melbourne Storm	7:00pm Thursday; 15 February 2023	Belmore Oval
South Sydney Rabbitohs		Sydney Roosters	6:00pm Friday; 23 February 2024	Belmore Oval
Cronulla-Sutherland Sharks		Canterbury-Bankstown Bulldogs	8:00pm Thursday; 23 February 2024	Belmore Oval

===== NRL season games =====
Home	Score	Away	Match Information
Home	Score	Away	Date	Venue & Crowd	Match
Canterbury-Bankstown Bulldogs	20–4	Melbourne Storm	7:00pm, Monday, 29 June 2015	Belmore Oval (16,764)	2015 NRL season Round 16
Canterbury-Bankstown Bulldogs	16–18	Cronulla-Sutherland Sharks	5:00pm, Sunday, 26 July 2015	Belmore Oval (19,005)	2015 NRL season Round 20
Canterbury-Bankstown Bulldogs	8–22	Canberra Raiders	7:00pm, Monday, 4 Apr 2016	Belmore Oval (13,463)	2016 NRL season Round 5
Canterbury-Bankstown Bulldogs	16–24	North Queensland Cowboys	7:50pm, Thursday, 25 August 2016	Belmore Oval (10,144)	2016 NRL season Round 25
Canterbury-Bankstown Bulldogs	6–12	Melbourne Storm	6:00pm, Friday, 3 March 2017	Belmore Oval (8,712)	2017 NRL season Round 1
Canterbury-Bankstown Bulldogs	20–18	Newcastle Knights	4:00pm, Sunday, 9 July 2017	Belmore Oval (13,103)	2017 NRL season Round 18
Canterbury-Bankstown Bulldogs	10–32	Gold Coast Titans	3:00pm, Saturday, 16 June 2018	Belmore Oval (6,874)	2018 NRL season Round 15
Canterbury-Bankstown Bulldogs	28–32	Canberra Raiders	7:30pm, Saturday, 7 July 2018	Belmore Oval (10,145)	2018 NRL season Round 17
Canterbury-Bankstown Bulldogs	6–28	Melbourne Storm	2:00pm, Sunday, 26 May 2019	Belmore Oval (13,131)	2019 NRL season Round 11
Canterbury-Bankstown Bulldogs	24–34	St George Illawarra Dragons	2:00pm, Sunday, 29 May 2022	Belmore Oval (16,991)	2022 NRL season Round 12
Canterbury-Bankstown Bulldogs	26–22	Wests Tigers	4:05pm, Sunday, 19 March 2023	Belmore Oval (16,404)	2023 NRL season Round 3
Canterbury-Bankstown Bulldogs	24–44	Brisbane Broncos	3:00pm, Saturday, 15 July 2023	Belmore Oval (17,103)	2023 NRL season Round 20
Canterbury-Bankstown Bulldogs	32–0	Gold Coast Titans	3:00pm, Saturday, 23 March 2024	Belmore Oval (12,037)	2024 NRL season Round 3
Canterbury-Bankstown Bulldogs	22-18	Canberra Raiders	4:05pm, Sunday, 4 August 2024	Belmore Oval (18,110)	2024 NRL season Round 22

===== World Club Championship games =====
Home	Score	Away	Match Information
Home	Score	Away	Date	Venue & Crowd	Match
Canterbury-Bankstown Bulldogs	18–22	Wigan Warriors	7:00pm, Monday, 9 June 1997	Belmore Sports Ground (10,680)	1997 World Club Championship; Round 1
Canterbury-Bankstown Bulldogs	58–6	Halifax Blue Sox	7:00pm, Monday, 16 June 1997	Belmore Sports Ground (5,034)	1997 World Club Championship; Round 2
Canterbury-Bankstown Bulldogs	34–18	London Broncos	3:00pm, Sunday, 22 June 1997	Belmore Sports Ground (4,000)	1997 World Club Championship; Round 3

== Ground record ==
The ground record attendance was set on 12 April 1993 during Round 5 of the 1993 NSWRL season when 27,804 saw Canterbury-Bankstown defeat Parramatta 42–6.
