= 2023 NRL Pre-season Challenge =

Rugby League season - Australia

- Duration: 9 – 19 February 2023
- Teams: 18
- Premiers: Manly Warringah (1st title)
- Matches played: 18

The 2023 NRL Pre-season Challenge was played between the 9th and 19th February 2023, before a 11-day lead up until the beginning of the 2023 NRL season.

== Background ==
The 2023 pre-season saw the introduction of the inaugural Pre-season Challenge, with bonus points rewarding teams for scoring tries, making line breaks and offloading.

As the 2023 World Club Challenge was hosted in Australia, the competition was incorporated into the final week of the Pre-season Challenge, which also resulted in St Helens participating in the NRL Pre-season Challenge in both weeks.

== Standings ==
The winner of the Pre-season Challenge would receive $100,000 AUD.

Twelve competition points are awarded for a win and six for a draw. One bonus competition point is awarded for each of the following: 5 or more tries, 5 or more line breaks, and 10 or more offloads.

Key to colours in table
| Winners of 2023 NRL Pre-season Challenge |

2023 NRL Pre-season Challenge
| Pos | Team | Pld | W | D | L | BP | PF | PA | PD | Pts |
|---|---|---|---|---|---|---|---|---|---|---|
| 1 | Manly-Warringah Sea Eagles | 2 | 2 | 0 | 0 | 5 | 58 | 44 | +14 | 29 |
| 2 | Cronulla-Sutherland Sharks | 2 | 2 | 0 | 0 | 4 | 64 | 32 | +32 | 28 |
| 3 | St Helens | 2 | 2 | 0 | 0 | 3 | 42 | 30 | +12 | 21^{1} |
| 4 | Gold Coast Titans | 2 | 1 | 1 | 0 | 3 | 64 | 40 | +24 | 21 |
| 5 | Brisbane Broncos | 2 | 1 | 1 | 0 | 2 | 44 | 42 | +2 | 20 |
| 6 | Penrith Panthers | 2 | 1 | 0 | 1 | 1 | 34 | 26 | +6 | 19^{1} |
| 7 | Melbourne Storm | 2 | 1 | 0 | 1 | 4 | 48 | 38 | +10 | 16 |
| 8 | Parramatta Eels | 2 | 1 | 0 | 1 | 3 | 52 | 36 | +16 | 15 |
| 9 | South Sydney Rabbitohs | 2 | 1 | 0 | 1 | 3 | 70 | 54 | +16 | 15 |
| 10 | Sydney Roosters | 2 | 1 | 0 | 1 | 3 | 48 | 52 | -4 | 15 |
| 11 | Wests Tigers | 2 | 1 | 0 | 1 | 3 | 48 | 52 | -4 | 15 |
| 12 | New Zealand Warriors | 2 | 1 | 0 | 1 | 2 | 54 | 36 | +18 | 14 |
| 13 | Canterbury-Bankstown Bulldogs | 2 | 1 | 0 | 1 | 2 | 50 | 54 | -4 | 14 |
| 14 | Dolphins | 2 | 0 | 1 | 1 | 3 | 38 | 62 | -24 | 9 |
| 15 | North Queensland Cowboys | 2 | 0 | 1 | 1 | 0 | 40 | 42 | -2 | 6 |
| 16 | St. George Illawarra Dragons | 2 | 0 | 0 | 2 | 2 | 42 | 72 | -30 | 2 |
| 17 | Newcastle Knights | 2 | 0 | 0 | 2 | 2 | 30 | 64 | -34 | 2 |
| 18 | Canberra Raiders | 2 | 0 | 0 | 2 | 1 | 22 | 70 | -48 | 1 |

Notes:
^{1} St Helens and Penrith each received six NRL Pre-season Challenge competition points for 'drawing' the 2023 World Club Challenge match that was won by St Helens in golden point extra time.

== Fixtures ==
=== First week ===
9 February 2023
18:00 NZDT (UTC+13:00)

| New Zealand Warriors | 48–12 | Wests Tigers |
|---|---|---|
| | Report |

Mt Smart Stadium, Auckland
Attendance: 4,000
Referee: Belinda Sharpe

10 February 2023
17:55 AEDT (UTC+11:00)

| Newcastle Knights | 16–28 | Cronulla Sutherland Sharks |
|---|---|---|
| | Report |

Industree Group Stadium, Gosford
Attendance: 9,807
Referee: Kasey Badger

10 February 2023
20:00 AEDT (UTC+11:00)

| South Sydney Rabbitohs | 28–30 | Manly-Warringah Sea Eagles |
|---|---|---|
| | Report |

Industree Group Stadium, Gosford
Attendance: 9,807
Referee: Todd Smith

11 February 2023
18:00 AEDT (UTC+11:00)

| Penrith Panthers | 22–16 | Parramatta Eels |
|---|---|---|
| | Report |

Bluebet Stadium, Sydney
Attendance: 3,525
Referee: Wyatt Raymond

11 February 2023
20:05 AEDT (UTC+11:00)

| St George Illawarra Dragons | 18–30 | St Helens |
|---|---|---|
| | Report |

WIN Stadium, Wollongong
Attendance: 6,463
Referee: Liam Kennedy

12 February 2023
13:50 AEDT (UTC+11:00)

| Melbourne Storm | 24–32 | Sydney Roosters |
|---|---|---|
| | Report |

GMHBA Stadium, Geelong
Attendance: 7,857
Referee: Chris Sutton

12 February 2023
15:55 AEDT (UTC+11:00)

| Canberra Raiders | 18–34 | Canterbury-Bankstown Bulldogs |
|---|---|---|
| | Report |

Ack Weyman Oval, Moruya
Attendance: 4,535
Referee: Peter Gough

12 February 2023
18:00 AEST (UTC+10:00)

| North Queensland Cowboys | 22–22 | Dolphins |
|---|---|---|
| | Report |

Barlow Park, Cairns
Attendance: 6,922
Referee: Ziggy Przeklasa-Adamski

12 February 2023
20:05 AEST (UTC+10:00)

| Brisbane Broncos | 24–24 | Gold Coast Titans |
|---|---|---|
| | Report |

Sunshine Coast Stadium, Sunshine Coast
Referee: Darian Furner

=== Second week ===
17 February 2023
17:55 AEDT (UTC+11:00)

| Newcastle Knights | 14–36 | Parramatta Eels |
|---|---|---|
| | Report |

Industree Group Stadium, Gosford
Attendance: 10,744
Referee: Grant Atkins

17 February 2023
20:00 AEDT (UTC+11:00)

| Sydney Roosters | 16–28 | Manly Warringah Sea Eagles |
|---|---|---|
| | Report |

Industree Group Stadium, Gosford
Attendance: 10,744
Referee: Chris Butler

18 February 2023
16:20 AEDT (UTC+11:00)

| St George Illawarra Dragons | 24–42 | South Sydney Rabbitohs |
|---|---|---|
| | Report |

Glen Willow Oval, Mudgee
Attendance: 8,317
Referee: Peter Gough

18 February 2023
18:50 AEDT (UTC+11:00)

| Penrith Panthers | 12–13 | St Helens |
|---|---|---|
| | Report |

Bluebet Stadium, Sydney
Attendance: 13,873
Referee: Ashley Klein

18 February 2023
19:55 AEST (UTC+10:00)

| Brisbane Broncos | 20–18 | North Queensland Cowboys |
|---|---|---|
| | Report |

Sunshine Coast Stadium, Sunshine Coast
Attendance: 4,605
Referee: Todd Smith

19 February 2023
14:50 NZDT (UTC+13:00)

| New Zealand Warriors | 6–24 | Melbourne Storm |
|---|---|---|
| | Report |

Orangetheory Stadium, Christchurch
Attendance: 12,000
Referee: Ziggy Przeklasa-Adamski

19 February 2023
14:55 AEDT (UTC+11:00)

| Wests Tigers | 36–4 | Canberra Raiders |
|---|---|---|
| | Report |

Belmore Sports Ground, Sydney
Attendance: 7,801
Referee: Ben Cummins

19 February 2023
17:00 AEDT (UTC+11:00)

| Canterbury-Bankstown Bulldogs | 16–36 | Cronulla-Sutherland Sharks |
|---|---|---|
| | Report |

Belmore Sports Ground, Sydney
Attendance: 7,801
Referee: Liam Kennedy

19 February 2023
19:05 AEST (UTC+10:00)

| Dolphins | 16–40 | Gold Coast Titans |
|---|---|---|
| | Report |

Kayo Stadium, Brisbane
Attendance: 7,206
Referee: Adam Gee

== See also ==
- 2023 NRL season
- 2023 NRL season results
