= Stephen Kemp =

English pianist and composer (1849-1918)

Stephen Benjamin Kemp (November 8, 1849 – October 30, 1918) was an English pianist, piano pedagogue, music editor, and composer.

== Education and career ==
Born in Great Yarmouth, Norfolk, England, Stephen Kemp was trained at the Royal Academy of Music (RAM) where he attended as a scholarship student for a three-year period. His teachers at the RAM included brothers George and Walter Macfarren, William Sterndale Bennett, Otto Goldschmidt, John Goss, and Ernst Pauer. He made his professional debut as a concert pianist at the age of fourteen at the Assembly Rooms in Yarmouth, and was thereafter active as a concert pianist in London for many years.

Kemp was an active member of the Royal Philharmonic Society. In 1871 he gave a highly successful concert tour of England and Wales with the clarinetist Henry Lazarus. In 1878 he toured Norway with the flautist Oluf Svendsen.

Kemp taught piano on the faculty of the National Training School of Music from 1876 until the school closed in 1882. After this he taught piano concurrently on the faculties of the RAM and the Guildhall School of Music and Drama up until his death in 1918. In addition to his work as a teacher and concert pianist he was also a composer of works for both piano and organ. He also worked as a music editor for the publisher Edwin Ashdown (1826-1912).

== Personal life ==
Kemp was married twice during his life, first to Clara Beasley who died, and then to Gertrude E. Thorne (marriage in 1905). The second of his three sons was the marine biologist Stanley Wells Kemp. He also was the father of three daughters.

Stephen Kemp died on October 20, 1918, in London.
