= Brad Scott (New Zealand footballer) =

New Zealand footballer

Personal information
- Full name: Brad Scott
- Date of birth: 15 June 1977 (age 49)
- Place of birth: Wanganui, New Zealand
- Height: 1.85 m (6 ft 1 in)
- Position: Striker

Senior career*
Years	Team	Apps	(Gls)
- Mount Wellington
- Glenfield Rovers
- Wanganui Athletic
- Auckland City FC
- Otago United
- Napier City Rovers
- North Shore United
- Floreat Athena

International career
2000	New Zealand	2	(1)
- * Club domestic league appearances and goals

Brad Scott (born 15 June 1977) is a former New Zealand soccer player, who played 2 full internationals and represented the U23 NZ side 17 times.

== Playing career ==
Scott played for Floreat Athena in the Football West State League (2009–010 season) where he won player of the year and won the golden boot for the club in (2009) and was a part of the Night Series winning team in 2010. Scott was picked in the Football West – WA side in 2009 which played against SA.

Scott had playing stints in Hong Kong and Indonesia where he represented clubs Happy Valley (2006/7) and Sriwijaya FC (2005/6).

During the 2005 Northern League season, Scott scored 17 goals for North Shore United and finished as the top scorer in the league. He won the same title in the 2004 Northern League where he scored 23 goals for North Shore United.

In the National Soccer League in Australia played two seasons. One for the Football Kingz (2003/4 season) and another for the Canberra Cosmos (2000/01).

Scott made two A-international appearances for New Zealand in 2000, scoring 1 goal on his debut against Malaysia.
