= List of Dorset County Cricket Club List A players =

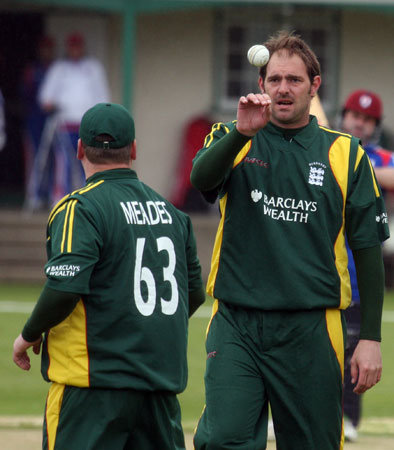
Lee Savident played one match for Dorset in 2003, taking a single wicket

Dorset County Cricket Club was formed in 1896, and first competed in the Minor Counties Championship in 1897. Their first appearance in List A cricket was in 1968, and in total they have played twenty matches, making two Gillette Cup, thirteen NatWest Trophy and five Cheltenham & Gloucester Trophy appearances. (Note: The Gillette Cup, NatWest Trophy and Cheltenham & Gloucester Trophy were all the same competition, under different sponsorship guises.) On five occasions the county progressed to the second round of the competition: in 1999, 2000, 2001, 2002, and 2004 and only once did it progress beyond to the third round, in 2000. Minor counties teams were excluded from the competition from the 2006 season; Dorset's last match was against Yorkshire in the first round of the 2004 competition.

In their twenty List A matches, 88 players have represented Dorset. Stuart Rintoul has appeared the most times for the county, playing in ten matches. Graeme Calway recorded the highest score in List A cricket for Dorset, scoring 105 runs against Hampshire in 1992. Jon Hardy, who also during his career played 142 first-class matches is Dorset's leading run-scorer, having scored 217 runs in his four appearances for the county. Vyvian Pike's nine wickets for the county is the most by any player, as well as having the best bowling figures, having taken five wickets against Norfolk in 2000. Martin Miller, who appeared for Dorset on seven occasions, has claimed the most dismissals as wicket-keeper, taking six catches and making two stumpings. Five non-English players have appeared for Dorset; Guernsey's Lee Savident, Scotland's Ian Sanders and South Africa's Andrew Hodgson, Ian Stuart and Lloyd Ferreira.

The players in this list have all played at least one List A match. Dorset cricketers who have not represented the county in List A cricket are not included in the list. Players are initially listed in order of appearance; where players made their debut in the same match, they are initially listed by batting order.

== Key ==
General

- ‡ – Captain
- † – Wicket-keeper
- ^{F} – Player has appeared in first-class cricket.
- First – Year of debut for Dorset
- Last – Year of latest match played for Dorset
- Mat – Number of matches played for Dorset
- Win% – Winning percentage

Batting

- Inn – Number of innings batted
- NO – Number of innings not out
- Runs – Runs scored in career
- HS – Highest score
- 100 – Centuries scored
- 50 – Half-centuries scored
- Avg – Runs scored per dismissal
- * – Batsman remained not out

Bowling

- Balls – Balls bowled in career
- Wkt – Wickets taken in career
- BBI – Best bowling in an innings
- BBM – Best bowling in a match
- Ave – Average runs per wicket

Fielding

- Ca – Catches taken
- St – Stumpings effected

== List of players ==
| No. | Name | Nationality | First | Last | Mat | Runs | HS | Avg | Balls | Wkt | BBI | Ave | Ca | St |
| No. | Name | Nationality | First | Last | Mat | Batting | | | Bowling | | | | Fielding | |
|---|---|---|---|---|---|---|---|---|---|---|---|---|---|---|
| 1 | David Daniels | England | 1968 | 1968 | 1 | 10 | 10 | 10.00 | 0 | 0 | – | – | 0 | 0 |
| 2 | John Baker | England | 1968 | 1968 | 1 | 20 | 20 | 20.00 | 0 | 0 | – | – | 0 | 0 |
| 3 | Colin Roper | England | 1968 | 1968 | 1 | 0 | 0 | 0.00 | 0 | 0 | – | – | 0 | 0 |
| 4 | Michael Beale † | England | 1968 | 1973 | 2 | 3 | 3 | 1.50 | 0 | 0 | – | – | 0 | 1 |
| 5 | Geoff Hunter ♠ | England | 1968 | 1973 | 2 | 26 | 18 | 13.00 | 0 | 0 | – | – | 1 | 0 |
| 6 | Harold Stephenson † | England | 1968 | 1968 | 1 | 16 | 16 | 16.00 | 0 | 0 | – | – | 0 | 0 |
| 7 | Mark Hardwicke ♠ | England | 1968 | 1968 | 1 | 4 | 4 | 4.00 | 1 | 0 | – | – | 0 | 0 |
| 8 | Derek Hayward | England | 1968 | 1983 | 3 | 11 | 7 | 3.66 | 216 | 6 | 3/15 | 10.33 | 0 | 0 |
| 9 | Roger Miller | England | 1968 | 1968 | 1 | 15 | 15* | – | 6 | 0 | – | – | 0 | 0 |
| 10 | Michael Doggrell | England | 1968 | 1968 | 1 | 0 | 0 | 0.00 | 42 | 0 | – | – | 0 | 0 |
| 11 | Peter Stuckey | England | 1968 | 1968 | 1 | 6 | 6 | 6.00 | 24 | 0 | – | – | 0 | 0 |
| 12 | Kenneth House | England | 1973 | 1973 | 1 | 15 | 15 | 15.00 | 0 | 0 | – | – | 2 | 0 |
| 13 | David Bulfield | England | 1973 | 1973 | 1 | 5 | 5 | 5.00 | 0 | 0 | – | – | 0 | 0 |
| 14 | Timothy Hall | England | 1973 | 1973 | 1 | 23 | 23 | 23.00 | 0 | 0 | – | – | 1 | 0 |
| 15 | David Robinson | England | 1973 | 1973 | 1 | 2 | 2 | 2.00 | 0 | 0 | – | – | 0 | 0 |
| 16 | Alexander Watson | England | 1973 | 1973 | 1 | 2 | 2 | 2.00 | 72 | 3 | 3/39 | 13.00 | 1 | 0 |
| 17 | Andrew Marsh | England | 1973 | 1973 | 1 | 1 | 1 | 1.00 | 72 | 0 | – | – | 0 | 0 |
| 18 | Andrew Hodgson | South Africa | 1973 | 1973 | 1 | 2 | 2 | 2.00 | 72 | 1 | 1/37 | 37.00 | 0 | 0 |
| 19 | Derek Shackleton | England | 1973 | 1973 | 1 | 18 | 18* | – | 72 | 4 | 4/11 | 2.75 | 1 | 0 |
| 20 | Richard Lewis | England | 1983 | 1986 | 2 | 28 | 28 | 14.00 | – | 0 | – | – | 0 | 0 |
| 21 | Andrew Kennedy ♠ | England | 1983 | 1987 | 3 | 59 | 39 | 18.33 | 108 | 1 | 1/6 | 70.00 | 1 | 0 |
| 22 | Barry Lewis ♠ | England | 1983 | 1992 | 6 | 25 | 11 | 5.00 | 0 | 0 | – | – | 1 | 0 |
| 23 | Simon Halliday | England | 1983 | 1987 | 3 | 19 | 9 | 6.33 | 0 | 0 | – | – | 1 | 0 |
| 24 | Richard Scott | England | 1983 | 1998 | 3 | 28 | 14 | 9.33 | 96 | 1 | 1/89 | 113.00 | 0 | 0 |
| 25 | Christopher Stone | England | 1983 | 1990 | 5 | 65 | 32* | 16.25 | 294 | 3 | 2/44 | 57.00 | 0 | 0 |
| 26 | Michael Wagstaffe ♠ | England | 1983 | 1983 | 1 | 34 | 34 | – | 2 | 0 | – | – | 1 | 0 |
| 27 | David Ridley † | England | 1983 | 1989 | 3 | 18 | 10 | 6.00 | 0 | 0 | – | – | 2 | 0 |
| 28 | Christopher Allen | England | 1983 | 1983 | 1 | 7 | 7 | 7.00 | 36 | 0 | – | – | 1 | 0 |
| 29 | Brian Shantry | England | 1983 | 1986 | 2 | 9 | 6 | 4.50 | 80 | 0 | – | – | 0 | 0 |
| 30 | Richard Merriman | England | 1986 | 1986 | 3 | 53 | 25 | 17.66 | 18 | 2 | 2/32 | 16.00 | 0 | 0 |
| 31 | Simon Turrill ♠ | England | 1986 | 1987 | 2 | 6 | 6 | 3.00 | 30 | 0 | – | – | 0 | 0 |
| 32 | Andrew Wingfield Digby ♠ | England | 1986 | 1992 | 5 | 34 | 23* | 17.00 | 336 | 2 | 1/30 | 136.00 | 0 | 0 |
| 33 | Ian Sanders | Scotland | 1986 | 1986 | 1 | 2 | 2 | 2.00 | 24 | 0 | – | – | 0 | 0 |
| 34 | Graeme Calway | England | 1987 | 1993 | 6 | 176 | 105 | 29.33 | 202 | 2 | 1/34 | 87.00 | 2 | 0 |
| 35 | Ian Stuart | South Africa | 1987 | 1999 | 2 | 32 | 23* | 32.00 | 102 | 0 | – | – | 0 | 0 |
| 36 | Steve Malone | England | 1987 | 1987 | 1 | 2 | 2 | 2.00 | 72 | 1 | 1/82 | 82.00 | 0 | 0 |
| 37 | Andrew Richardson † | England | 1987 | 1987 | 1 | 0 | 0 | – | 0 | 0 | – | – | 0 | 0 |
| 38 | Anthony Foot | England | 1989 | 1989 | 1 | 0 | 0 | – | 0 | 0 | – | – | 0 | 0 |
| 39 | John Claughton | England | 1989 | 1991 | 2 | 64 | 35 | 32.00 | 0 | 0 | – | – | 1 | 0 |
| 40 | Simon Legg | England | 1989 | 1989 | 1 | 66 | 66 | 66.00 | 0 | 0 | – | – | 0 | 0 |
| 41 | Stuart Rintoul ♠ | England | 1989 | 2003 | 10 | 184 | 55 | 23.00 | 0 | 0 | – | – | 1 | 0 |
| 42 | Jonathan Hall | England | 1989 | 1991 | 3 | 43 | 17 | 14.33 | 72 | 1 | 1/16 | 81.00 | 1 | 0 |
| 43 | Sunil Sawney | England | 1989 | 1991 | 2 | 10 | 8 | 5.00 | 86 | 1 | 1/71 | 86.00 | 1 | 0 |
| 44 | Neil Taylor | England | 1989 | 1991 | 3 | 17 | 10 | 5.66 | 204 | 3 | 2/25 | 48.33 | 0 | 0 |
| 45 | Giles Reynolds ♠† | England | 1990 | 2000 | 7 | 134 | 60 | 22.33 | 0 | 0 | – | – | 2 | 0 |
| 46 | James Graham-Brown | England | 1990 | 1991 | 2 | 76 | 58 | 38.00 | 6 | 0 | – | – | 0 | 0 |
| 47 | Shawn Fitzgerald † | England | 1990 | 1990 | 1 | 2 | 2* | – | 0 | 0 | – | – | 0 | 2 |
| 48 | Julian Shackleton | England | 1990 | 1998 | 6 | 3 | 2 | 3.00 | 372 | 1 | 1/18 | 163.00 | 0 | 0 |
| 49 | Richard Pyman | England | 1991 | 1999 | 5 | 24 | 23 | 6.00 | 258 | 2 | 1/47 | 112.50 | 0 | 0 |
| 50 | Alan Willows | England | 1991 | 1995 | 4 | 26 | 14 | 13.00 | 90 | 0 | – | – | 0 | 0 |
| 50 | Darren McBride | England | 1991 | 1992 | 2 | 27 | 27 | 27.00 | – | – | – | – | 2 | 0 |
| 51 | Derek Pepperell | England | 1992 | 1992 | 1 | 6 | 6 | 6.00 | 0 | 0 | – | – | 0 | 0 |
| 52 | Timothy Richings | England | 1992 | 1998 | 4 | 128 | 74* | 44.26 | 0 | 0 | – | – | 0 | 0 |
| 53 | Jon Hardy ♠ | England | 1992 | 1998 | 4 | 217 | 90* | 72.33 | 0 | 0 | – | – | 0 | 0 |
| 54 | Owen Parkin | England | 1992 | 1993 | 2 | 0 | 0 | – | 48 | 0 | – | – | 0 | 0 |
| 55 | Sean Walbridge | England | 1992 | 2003 | 7 | 19 | 11 | 6.33 | 322 | 1 | 1/34 | 252.00 | 0 | 0 |
| 56 | Paul Garlick | England | 1993 | 1995 | 6 | 0 | 0* | 0.00 | 299 | 5 | 3/31 | 33.80 | 0 | 0 |
| 57 | Julian Cassell | England | 1995 | 1999 | 2 | 29 | 24 | 14.50 | 0 | 0 | – | – | 0 | 0 |
| 58 | Lloyd Ferreira | South Africa | 1998 | 1998 | 1 | 7 | 7 | 7.00 | 18 | 0 | – | – | 0 | 0 |
| 59 | Matthew Swarbrick | England | 1998 | 2003 | 5 | 40 | 24 | 10.00 | 0 | 0 | – | – | 0 | 0 |
| 60 | Timothy Lamb ♠† | England | 1998 | 2004 | 3 | 15 | 15* | 15.00 | 0 | 0 | – | – | 2 | 0 |
| 61 | Vyvian Pike ♠ | England | 1998 | 2001 | 5 | 71 | 45 | 17.75 | 312 | 9 | 5/10 | 20.55 | 2 | 0 |
| 62 | Steve Forshaw | England | 1998 | 2002 | 5 | 12 | 7* | 4.00 | 234 | 7 | 2/22 | 30.85 | 1 | 0 |
| 63 | Neil Thurgood | England | 1999 | 2004 | 5 | 29 | 22 | 7.25 | 0 | 0 | – | – | 1 | 0 |
| 64 | David Miller | England | 1999 | 1999 | 1 | 41 | 41 | 41.00 | 0 | 0 | – | – | 0 | 0 |
| 65 | Peter Deakin | England | 1999 | 2004 | 6 | 52 | 23 | 8.66 | 80 | 4 | 2/6 | 15.50 | 4 | 0 |
| 66 | Charlie Holcomb | England | 1999 | 1999 | 1 | 1 | 1 | 1.00 | 0 | 0 | – | – | 0 | 0 |
| 67 | Martin Miller † | England | 1999 | 2003 | 7 | 150 | 81 | 25.00 | 0 | 0 | – | – | 6 | 2 |
| 68 | Edward Elliot-Square | England | 1999 | 1999 | 1 | 20 | 20* | – | 60 | 0 | – | – | 1 | 0 |
| 69 | Glyn Treagus | England | 2000 | 2004 | 7 | 104 | 76 | 17.33 | 233 | 1 | 1/44 | 220.00 | 0 | 0 |
| 70 | David Kidner | England | 2000 | 2004 | 3 | 28 | 23* | 28.00 | 78 | 1 | 1/21 | 65.00 | 0 | 0 |
| 71 | Tom Hicks | England | 2000 | 2000 | 1 | 0 | 0 | 0.00 | 60 | 0 | – | – | 0 | 0 |
| 72 | Toby Sharpe | England | 2000 | 2000 | 1 | 0 | 0 | – | 60 | 1 | 1/56 | 56.00 | 0 | 0 |
| 73 | Matthew Keech | England | 2001 | 2001 | 1 | 73 | 73 | 73.00 | 0 | 0 | – | – | 1 | 0 |
| 74 | Kristian Wilson | England | 2001 | 2001 | 2 | 0 | 0 | 0.00 | 66 | 1 | 1/41 | 55.00 | 0 | 0 |
| 75 | Daniel Britton | England | 2001 | 2001 | 1 | 0 | 0* | – | 42 | 2 | 2/30 | 15.00 | 0 | 0 |
| 76 | Chris Park † | England | 2001 | 2004 | 2 | 58 | 35 | 29.00 | 0 | 0 | – | – | 0 | 0 |
| 77 | Ben Lawes | England | 2001 | 2004 | 3 | 31 | 20 | 10.33 | 66 | 0 | – | – | 0 | 0 |
| 78 | Andrew Bell | England | 2001 | 2001 | 1 | 24 | 24* | – | 0 | 0 | – | – | 0 | 0 |
| 79 | James Elliot-Square | England | 2001 | 2001 | 1 | 1 | 1 | 1.00 | 18 | 0 | – | – | 0 | 0 |
| 80 | James Tizzard | England | 2001 | 2001 | 1 | 0 | 0 | 0.00 | 5 | 0 | – | – | 0 | 0 |
| 81 | Danny Kerry | England | 2002 | 2002 | 1 | 2 | 2 | 2.00 | 24 | 0 | – | – | 1 | 0 |
| 82 | Reginald Keates | England | 2002 | 2004 | 3 | 3 | 2 | 1.50 | 120 | 3 | 2/48 | 27.33 | 0 | 0 |
| 83 | Damian Worrad | England | 2002 | 2004 | 2 | 29 | 17 | 14.50 | 78 | 3 | 2/31 | 20.00 | 0 | 0 |
| 84 | Joseph Wilson | England | 2002 | 2003 | 2 | 0 | 0* | – | 108 | 4 | 2/36 | 19.00 | 0 | 0 |
| 85 | Lee Savident | Guernsey | 2003 | 2003 | 1 | 0 | 0 | – | 48 | 1 | 1/54 | 54.00 | 0 | 0 |
| 86 | Matthew Mixer | England | 2003 | 2003 | 1 | 0 | 0 | – | 48 | 1 | 1/54 | 54.00 | 0 | 0 |
| 87 | Darren Cowley | England | 2004 | 2004 | 1 | 11 | 11 | 11.00 | 0 | 0 | – | – | 0 | 0 |
| 88 | Martin Ford | England | 2004 | 2004 | 1 | 1 | 1 | 1.00 | 30 | 0 | – | – | 0 | 0 |

== List A captains ==
| No. | Name | First | Last | Mat | Won | Lost | Tied | Win% |
|---|---|---|---|---|---|---|---|---|
| 1 | Mark Hardwicke | 1968 | 1968 | 1 | 0 | 1 | 0 | 0% |
| 2 | Geoff Hunter | 1973 | 1973 | 1 | 0 | 1 | 0 | 0% |
| 3 | Michael Wagstaffe | 1983 | 1983 | 1 | 0 | 1 | 0 | 0% |
| 4 | Andrew Kennedy | 1986 | 1987 | 2 | 0 | 2 | 0 | 0% |
| 5 | Andrew Wingfield Digby | 1989 | 1990 | 2 | 0 | 2 | 0 | 0% |
| 6 | Barry Lewis | 1991 | 1992 | 2 | 0 | 2 | 0 | 0% |
| 7 | Giles Reynolds | 1993 | 1995 | 2 | 0 | 2 | 0 | 0% |
| 8 | Jon Hardy | 1998 | 1998 | 1 | 0 | 1 | 0 | 0% |
| 9 | Vyvian Pike | 1999 | 1999 | 1 | 0 | 1 | 0 | 0% |
| 10 | Stuart Rintoul | 2000 | 2003 | 6 | 2 | 4 | 0 | 33.33% |
| 11 | Timothy Lamb | 2004 | 2004 | 1 | 0 | 1 | 0 | 0% |
| Total | | 1968 | 2004 | 20 | 2 | 18 | 0 | 10.00% |
