= 1995–96 Canberra Cosmos FC season =

Canberra Cosmos
1995–96 season
- Manager: Mick Lyons
- Stadium: Bruce Stadium
- National Soccer League: 9th
- NSL Cup: Semi-finals
- Top goalscorer: League: Paul Wade (9); All: Paul Wade (11)
- Highest home attendance: 5,490 vs. Sydney United (14 October 1995); National Soccer League
- Lowest home attendance: 1,145 vs. Wollongong City (16 March 1996); National Soccer League
- Average home league attendance: 2,933
- Biggest win: 5–0 vs. Morwell Falcons (H) (13 December 1995); National Soccer League
- Biggest defeat: 0–6 vs. Adelaide City (A) (10 March 1996); National Soccer League

The 1995–96 season was the first in the history of Canberra Cosmos. It was also the first season in the National Soccer League. In addition to the domestic league, they also participated in the NSL Cup. Canberra Cosmos finished 9th in their National Soccer League season, and were eliminated in the NSL Cup semi-finals by South Melbourne.

== Players ==
Note: Flags indicate national team as defined under FIFA eligibility rules; some limited exceptions apply. Players may hold more than one non-FIFA nationality.

No.	Pos.	Nation	Player
1	GK	AUS	Danny Milosevic
2	MF	AUS	Paul Dee
3	DF	AUS	Joe Gagetti
4	DF	AUS	Richard Watson
5	DF	AUS	Jason Dunn
6	MF	AUS	Paul Wade
7	MF	AUS	Michael Garcia
8	MF	ENG	Paul McVittie
9	MF	AUS	Lachlan Armstrong
10	FW	AUS	Marko Perinovic
11	DF	AUS	Toplica Popovich
12	MF	AUS	Arsenije Popovich
13	FW	AUS	Paul Gagetti
14	MF	AUS	James Baxter
15	MF	AUS	Alex Castro

No.	Pos.	Nation	Player
16	MF	AUS	Scott Conlon
17	MF	ARG	Leo Langone
18	MF	NIR	Norman Kelly
19	MF	AUS	Elliot Zwangobani
20	GK	AUS	Ben Harris
21	DF	AUS	John Koch
22	FW	AUS	Michael Musitano
23	DF	AUS	Stan Dukic
24	FW	AUS	Tony Lemezina
25	GK	AUS	Steve Mautone
26	MF	AUS	Gus Cerro
27	DF	AUS	Peter Mazis
29	MF	AUS	Njegosh Popovich
30	GK	AUS	Anthony Giannasca
—	MF	AUS	Willie Hastie

== Competitions ==
=== Overview ===
Competition	First match	Last match	Starting round	Final position	Record							
Competition	First match	Last match	Starting round	Final position	Pld	W	D	L	GF	GA	GD	Win %
National Soccer League	8 October 1995	28 April 1996	Matchday 1	9th	33	8	11	14	48	61	−13	24.24
NSL Cup	3 January 1996	25 January 1996	First round	Semi-finals	3	1	1	1	3	4	−1	33.33
Total					36	9	12	15	51	65	−14	25.00

Last updated: complete
Source: Competitions

=== National Soccer League ===
==== League table ====
Pos	Team	Pld	W	D	L	GF	GA	GD	Pts	Qualification
1	Marconi Fairfield	33	17	9	7	58	35	+23	60	Qualification for the Finals series
2	Melbourne Knights (C)	33	17	8	8	50	28	+22	59	Qualification for the Finals series
3	UTS Olympic	33	17	8	8	55	41	+14	59	Qualification for the Finals series
4	Brisbane Strikers	33	17	6	10	54	35	+19	57	Qualification for the Finals series
5	Adelaide City	33	15	9	9	65	40	+25	54	Qualification for the Finals series
6	Sydney United	33	14	12	7	47	33	+14	54	Qualification for the Finals series
7	West Adelaide	33	16	5	12	49	43	+6	53	
8	South Melbourne	33	14	4	15	50	56	−6	46	
9	Canberra Cosmos	33	8	11	14	48	61	−13	35	
10	Morwell Falcons	33	9	8	16	35	65	−30	35	
11	Wollongong City	33	5	5	23	31	63	−32	20	
12	Newcastle Breakers	33	4	5	24	35	77	−42	17	

Updated to match(es) played on unknown. Source: rsssf.com
Rules for classification: 1) points; 2) goal difference; 3) number of goals scored.
(C) Champions

==== Results by round ====
Round	1	2	3	4	5	6	7	8	9	10	11	12	13	14	15	16	17	18	19	20	21	22	23	24	25	26	27	28	29	30	31	32	33
Ground	A	H	H	A	H	A	H	A	H	A	H	H	A	A	H	A	H	A	H	A	H	A	A	H	H	A	H	A	H	A	H	A	H
Result	L	D	D	D	L	L	D	L	W	W	W	D	L	W	W	L	L	L	L	D	D	D	L	D	W	L	D	D	L	L	W	L	W
Position	11	10	10	10	12	12	12	12	10	9	9	9	9	9	8	9	9	10	10	10	10	10	10	10	10	10	10	10	10	10	10	10	9

Source: worldfootball.net
A = Away; H = Home; W = Win; D = Draw; L = Loss

==== Matches ====
8 October 1995 1	Adelaide City	2–0	Canberra Cosmos	Adelaide
	Mori 70', 89'	Report		Stadium: Hindmarsh Stadium; Attendance: 4,680; Referee: J. Papanicolas

14 October 1995 2	Canberra Cosmos	0–0	Sydney United	Canberra
		Report		Stadium: Bruce Stadium; Attendance: 5,490; Referee: Con Diomis

22 October 1995 4	South Melbourne	2–2	Canberra Cosmos	Melbourne
	Damianos 65'; Panopoulos 75'	Report	Dee 38'; Dunn 55'	Stadium: Olympic Park; Attendance: 2,725; Referee: Cain Naumcevski

28 October 1995 5	Canberra Cosmos	2–3	UTS Olympic	Canberra
	Kelly 52'; Perinovic 57'	Report	Meredith 30'; Augerinos 77'; Tome 85'	Stadium: Bruce Stadium; Attendance: 3,920; Referee: Shaun Micaleff

1 November 1995 3	Canberra Cosmos	2–2	Wollongong City	Canberra
	Musitano 4'; Armstrong 15'	Report	Naumovski 34'; Forshaw 82'	Stadium: Bruce Stadium; Attendance: 2,210; Referee: Gerry Connolly

4 November 1995 6	Marconi Fairfield	1–0	Canberra Cosmos	Sydney
	Awaritefe 7'	Report		Stadium: Marconi Stadium; Attendance: 3,617; Referee: J. Papanicolas

11 November 1995 7	Canberra Cosmos	1–1	West Adelaide	Canberra
	Wade 90+3'	Report	Cardozo 90'	Stadium: Bruce Stadium; Attendance: 3,210; Referee: C. Naumcevski

18 November 1995 8	Brisbane Strikers	3–1	Canberra Cosmos	Brisbane
	Farina 26'; Cranney 32'; Brayshaw 90'	Report	Armstrong 89'	Stadium: Suncorp Stadium; Attendance: 4,809; Referee: M. Shield

25 November 1995 9	Canberra Cosmos	3–2	Newcastle Breakers	Canberra
	Wade 56', 68' (pen.), 72'	Report	Zane 58'; Sprod 89'	Stadium: Bruce Stadium; Attendance: 2,240; Referee: Con Diomis

3 December 1995 10	Melbourne Knights	1–3	Canberra Cosmos	Melbourne
	Spiteri 35'	Report	Wade 3'; Perinovic 13'; Musitano 78'	Stadium: Melbourne Croatian Sports Centre; Attendance: 4,523; Referee: John Fraser

9 December 1995 12	Canberra Cosmos	0–0	Adelaide City	Canberra
		Report		Stadium: Bruce Stadium; Attendance: 4,120; Referee: John Fraser

13 December 1995 11	Canberra Cosmos	5–0	Morwell Falcons	Canberra
	Perinovic 9'; Armstrong 20', 42'; Musitano 79'; Wade 81'	Report		Stadium: Bruce Stadium; Attendance: 2,170; Referee: Brett Hugo

16 December 1995 13	Sydney United	3–0	Canberra Cosmos	Sydney
	Popovic 24' (pen.), 52' (pen.); Lamond 65'	Report		Stadium: Sydney Croatian Sports Centre; Attendance: 4,984; Referee: Shaun Micallef

21 December 1995 14	Wollongong City	1–3	Canberra Cosmos	Wollongong
	Petratos 57'	Report	O'Shea 68' (o.g.); Lemezina 80'; Popovich 88'	Stadium: Brandon Park; Attendance: 3,201; Referee: Eddie Lennie

26 December 1995 15	Canberra Cosmos	3–1	South Melbourne	Canberra
	Wade 52' (pen.), 62' (pen.); Lemezina 78'	Report	Blatsis 86'	Stadium: Bruce Stadium; Attendance: 3,128; Referee: Con Diomis

30 December 1995 16	UTS Olympic	2–0	Canberra Cosmos	Sydney
	Slater 82'; Trajanovski 89'	Report		Stadium: Leichhardt Oval; Attendance: 4,753; Referee: Brett Hugo

6 January 1996 17	Canberra Cosmos	1–3	Marconi Fairfield	Canberra
	Wade 84'	Report	Maloney 13'; Harper 69'; Awaritefe 73'	Stadium: Bruce Stadium; Attendance: 5,290; Referee: Simon Micallef

4 February 1996 18	West Adelaide	2–1	Canberra Cosmos	Adelaide
	Tsekinis 46'; Ndongo-Keller 85'	Report	Castro 37'	Stadium: Hindmarsh Stadium; Attendance: 3,516; Referee: Wayne Dade

10 February 1996 19	Canberra Cosmos	1–2	Brisbane Strikers	Canberra
	Musitano 35'	Report	Ditton 10'; Phillips 72'	Stadium: Bruce Stadium; Attendance: 1,623; Referee: Gerry Connelly

16 February 1996 20	Newcastle Breakers	5–5	Canberra Cosmos	Newcastle
	Thomas 10'; Halpin 33', 45', 62'; Koch 49' (o.g.)	Report	Wade 53', 88'; Musitano 69'; Kelly 78'; Dunn 83'	Stadium: Breakers Stadium; Attendance: 2,817; Referee: Mark Shield

24 February 1996 21	Canberra Cosmos	3–3	Melbourne Knights	Canberra
	Marth 46' (o.g.); Castro 72'; Perinovic 89'	Report	Kutlesovski 22'; Pondeljak 30'; Cervinski 63'	Stadium: Bruce Stadium; Attendance: 2,669; Referee: D. Crawford

2 March 1996 22	Morwell Falcons	1–1	Canberra Cosmos	Morwell
	Masi 36'	Report	Lemezina 57'	Stadium: Falcons Park; Attendance: 2,182; Referee: Con Diomis

10 March 1996 23	Adelaide City	6–0	Canberra Cosmos	Adelaide
	Hassell 11' (90); Foster 21', 27'; Mori 44', 65'	Report		Stadium: Hindmarsh Stadium; Attendance: 4,188; Referee: John Papanicolas

13 March 1996 24	Canberra Cosmos	1–1	Sydney United	Canberra
	Popovic 9' (o.g.)	Report	Lamond 85'	Stadium: Bruce Stadium; Attendance: 1,498; Referee: Mark Shield

16 March 1996 25	Canberra Cosmos	1–0	Wollongong City	Canberra
	Perinovic 25'	Report		Stadium: Bruce Stadium; Attendance: 1,145; Referee: D. Crawford

24 March 1996 26	South Melbourne	3–2	Canberra Cosmos	Melbourne
	Curcija 33'; Coveny 40', 55'	Report	Perinovic 19'; Castro 68'	Stadium: Bob Jane Stadium; Attendance: 4,169; Referee: W. Dade

27 March 1996 27	Canberra Cosmos	1–1	UTS Olympic	Canberra
	Armstrong 90'	Report	Trajanovski 39'	Stadium: Bruce Stadium; Attendance: 2,340; Referee: Simon Micallef

30 March 1996 28	Marconi Fairfield	2–2	Canberra Cosmos	Sydney
	Harper 17'; Zoric 60'	Report	Mazis 67'; Musitano 78'	Stadium: Marconi Stadium; Attendance: 4,016; Referee: D. Crawford

6 April 1996 29	Canberra Cosmos	0–1	West Adelaide	Canberra
		Report	Taliadoros 16'	Stadium: Bruce Stadium; Attendance: 2,176; Referee: B. Hugo

8 April 1996 30	Brisbane Strikers	2–0	Canberra Cosmos	Brisbane
	Polak 63'; Cranney 81'	Report		Stadium: Suncorp Stadium; Attendance: 3,953; Referee: M. Shield

13 April 1996 31	Canberra Cosmos	2–0	Newcastle Breakers	Canberra
	Hickman 44' (o.g.); Lemezina 69'	Report		Stadium: Bruce Stadium; Attendance: 1,521; Referee: J. Fraser

21 April 1996 32	Melbourne Knights	5–0	Canberra Cosmos	Melbourne
	Marth 16'; Kovacevic 51'; Cervinski 77', 82'; Pondeljak 89'	Report		Stadium: Melbourne Croatian Sports Centre; Attendance: 3,310; Referee: E. Lennie

28 April 1996 33	Canberra Cosmos	2–0	Morwell Falcons	Canberra
	Perinovic 40'; Lemezina 58'	Report		Stadium: Bruce Stadium; Attendance: 5,127; Referee: W. Dade

=== NSL Cup ===
3 January 1996 First round 1st Leg	West Adelaide	1–1	Canberra Cosmos	Adelaide
	Day 73'	Report	Dunn 53'	Stadium: Hindmarsh Stadium; Attendance: 2,600; Referee: J. Papinicolas

20 January 1996 First round 2nd Leg	Canberra Cosmos	1–0	West Adelaide	Canberra
	Perinovic 64'	Report		Stadium: Bruce Stadium; Attendance: 1,592; Referee: G. Connelly

25 January 1996 Semi-finals	South Melbourne	3–1	Canberra Cosmos	Melbourne
	Allsopp 45'; Damianos 68'; Trimboli 79'	Report	Lemezina 87'	Stadium: Lakeside Stadium; Attendance: 2,360; Referee: B. Hugo

== Statistics ==
=== Appearances and goals ===
Players with no appearances not included in the list.

No.	Pos.	Nat.	Name	National Soccer League		NSL Cup		Total	
No.	Pos.	Nat.	Name	Apps	Goals	Apps	Goals	Apps	Goals
1	GK	(Australia)	Danny Milosevic	3	0	0	0	3	0
2	MF	(Australia)	Paul Dee	29(1)	1	3	0	33	1
3	DF	(Australia)	Joe Gagetti	5	0	0	0	5	0
4	DF	(Australia)	Richard Watson	23(1)	0	1(1)	0	26	0
5	DF	(Australia)	Jason Dunn	27	2	2	1	29	3
6	MF	(Australia)	Paul Wade	28	11	2	0	30	11
7	MF	(Australia)	Michael Garcia	9(2)	0	1	0	12	0
8	MF	(England)	Paul McVittie	1	0	0	0	1	0
9	MF	(Australia)	Lachlan Armstrong	20	5	1	0	21	5
10	FW	(Australia)	Marko Perinovic	26(2)	7	3	1	31	8
11	DF	(Australia)	Toplica Popovich	17(1)	0	3	0	21	0
12	MF	(Australia)	Arsenije Popovich	3(6)	1	0(1)	0	10	1
13	FW	(Australia)	Paul Gagetti	0	0	0	0	0	0
14	MF	(Australia)	James Baxter	4(5)	0	0(1)	0	10	0
15	MF	(Australia)	Alex Castro	15(1)	3	1	0	17	3
16	MF	(Australia)	Scott Conlon	0	0	0	0	0	0
17	MF	(Argentina)	Leo Langone	0	0	0	0	0	0
18	MF	(Northern Ireland)	Norman Kelly	21	2	0	0	21	2
19	MF	(Australia)	Elliot Zwangobani	0	0	0	0	0	0
20	GK	(Australia)	Ben Harris	1	0	2	0	3	0
21	DF	(Australia)	John Koch	26	1	3	0	29	1
22	FW	(Australia)	Michael Musitano	23(3)	5	3	0	29	5
23	DF	(Australia)	Stan Dukic	8(4)	0	2	0	14	0
24	FW	(Australia)	Tony Lemezina	14(9)	5	1(1)	1	25	6
25	GK	(Australia)	Steve Mautone	20	0	1	0	21	0
26	MF	(Australia)	Gus Cerro	6	0	1	0	7	0
27	DF	(Australia)	Peter Mazis	18	1	3	0	21	1
29	MF	(Australia)	Njegosh Popovich	3(2)	0	0	0	5	0
30	GK	(Australia)	Anthony Giannasca	9	0	0	0	9	0
—	MF	(Australia)	Willie Hastie	4(1)	0	0	0	5	0

=== Clean sheets ===
Rank	No.	Pos	Nat	Name	National Soccer League	NSL Cup	Total
1	30	GK	(Australia)	Anthony Giannasca	3	0	3
2	25	GK	(Australia)	Steve Mautone	2	0	2
3	1	GK	(Australia)	Danny Milosevic	1	0	1
3	20	GK	(Australia)	Ben Harris	0	1	1
Total					6	1	7
