= Bulfield =

Bulfield is an English surname. Notable people with the surname include:

- David Bulfield (1938–2025), English cricketer
- Grahame Bulfield (born 1941), English geneticist
