= Pyman =

Pyman is a surname. Notable people with this surname include:

- Avril Pyman (born 1930), British scholar and translator
- Frank Lee Pyman (1882–1944), English academic
- George Pyman (1822–1900), British shipping magnate
- Harold Pyman (1908–1971), British army officer
- Iain Pyman (born 1973), English golfer
- Richard Pyman (born 1968), English cricket player
- Robert Pyman (born 1971), Australian Australian rules football player
- Sydney Pyman Bell (1875–1944), English rugby union player and solicitor
- Trevor Pyman (1916–1995), Australian diplomat
