= Kristian Wilson =

Kristian or Christian Wilson may refer to:

- Kristian Wilson (cricketer) (born 1982), English cricketer
- A name that Marcus Brigstocke's Pac Man joke is often falsely attributed to
- Kristian Wilson (athlete), competed in Athletics at the 2009 Jeux de la Francophonie
- Christian Wilson, competed in German Figure Skating Championships
