= Rintoul =

Rintoul is a surname. Notable people with the surname include:

- Chad Rintoul (born 1974), Australian rules footballer
- Cole Rintoul (born 1982), Australian musician
- David Rintoul (born David Wilson, 1948), Scottish stage and television actor
- Douglas Rintoul, British playwright
- Gordon Rintoul (born 1955), Scottish museum director
- Harry Rintoul (1956–2002), Canadian playwright
- Ian Rintoul, Australian political activist
- Leonora Jeffrey Rintoul (1878–1953), Scottish ornithologist
- Robert Stephen Rintoul (1787–1858), British journalist
- Stuart Rintoul (born 1968), English cricketer
- Stuart Rintoul (journalist), Australian journalist and author, formerly on The Australian
- William Rintoul (1870–1936), British chemist
