= Turrill =

Turrill is a surname. Notable people with the surname include:

- Joel Turrill (1794–1859), American politician
- Simon Turrill (born 1962), English cricketer
- William Bertram Turrill (1890–1961), English botanist

== See also ==
- Richard Turrill McMullen (1830–1891), British yachtsman
