= Andrew Marsh =

Andrew Marsh or Andy Marsh may refer to:

- Andrew Marsh (American football) (born 2007), American football player
- Andrew Marsh (cricket) (born 1952), English cricketer
- Andy Marsh (born 1966), British police officer
- Andy Marsh, guitarist in Australian deathcore band Thy Art Is Murder
