= Kidner =

Kidner is a surname. Notable people with the surname include:

- David Kidner (born 1982), English cricketer
- Derek Kidner (1913–2008), English Anglican priest and biblical scholar
- Michael Kidner (1917–2009), British artist
- Roger Kidner (1914–2007), English railway historian
- Thomas B. Kidner (1866–1932), English occupational therapist

== See also ==
- Elaine Kidner Dakers, real name of Jane Lane (1905–1978), English novelist and biographer
