= Martin Ford =

Martin Ford may refer to:

- Martin Ford (author) (fl. 2000s–2020s), American non-fiction writer and futurist
- Martin Ford (cricketer) (born 1978), English cricketer
- Martin Ford (politician) (fl. 1980s–2020s), Scottish politician

== See also ==
- Martyn Ford (born 1944), English orchestral musician
- Martin Forde (born 1923), American labor union
