= Derek Pepperell =

English cricketer (born 1968)

Derek Pepperell (born 28 September 1968) was an English cricketer. He was a left-handed batsman and wicket-keeper who played for Dorset. He was born in Oxford.

Pepperell played for Hampshire and Sussex Second XIs between 1989 and 1990. Pepperell made a single List A appearance for Dorset in the 1992 NatWest Trophy. As an opening batsman, he scored 6 runs before being caught out, failing to emulate the form of batting partner Graeme Calway, who scored the only century of his career.
