= James Tizzard =

English cricketer

Personal information
- Full name: James George Tizzard
- Born: 12 November 1982 (age 44); Isleworth, London, England
- Batting: Right-handed
- Bowling: Right-arm medium-fast

Domestic team information
- Years: Team
- 2001–2002: Dorset

Career statistics
Competition	List A
Matches	1
Runs scored	0
Batting average	0.00
100s/50s	0/0
Top score	0
Balls bowled	5
Wickets	0
Bowling average	–
5 wickets in innings	–
10 wickets in match	–
Best bowling	–
Catches/stumpings	0/–
- Source: Cricinfo, 15 March 2010

James George Tizzard (born 12 November 1982) is a former English county cricketer. Tizzard was a right-handed batsman who bowled right-arm medium-fast.

Tizzard made a single List-A appearance for Dorset in the 2nd round of the 2002 Cheltenham & Gloucester Trophy, which was played in 2001 against Scotland. Tizzard was out caught off the bowling of Damien Wright in his only List-A innings. Tizzard also made a single Minor Counties Championship against Wiltshire in 2001. He is now located in Dubai working in the Oil and Gas market sector. He currently plays league cricket for the Infidels Cricket Club in the Last Man Stands Cricket League.
