= Leslie Bean =

English cricketer and British Army officer

Personal information
- Full name: Leslie Hugh Bean
- Born: 2 February 1906; Burnham-on-Sea, Somerset, England
- Died: 13 January 1988 (aged 81); Accra, Ghana
- Batting: Right-handed
- Bowling: Leg break googly

Domestic team information
- Years: Team
- 1929: Somerset
- First-class debut: 22 June 1929 Somerset v Essex
- Last First-class: 29 June 1929 Somerset v Sussex

Career statistics
Competition	First-class
Matches	3
Runs scored	35
Batting average	5.83
100s/50s	0/0
Top score	17
Balls bowled	24
Wickets	1
Bowling average	24.00
5 wickets in innings	0
10 wickets in match	0
Best bowling	1/14
Catches/stumpings	1/0
- Source: ESPNcricinfo, 17 November 2013

Colonel Leslie Hugh Bean OBE (2 February 1906 – 13 January 1988) was a British Army officer who played first-class cricket for Somerset in three matches in the 1929 season. He also played Minor Counties cricket more frequently for Dorset between 1928 and 1939 and in non-first-class matches for the British Army Cricket Team. He was born at Burnham-on-Sea, Somerset, England and died at Accra, Ghana.

== Military career ==
Bean went to school at Sherborne. A career soldier, he was commissioned in 1926 into the Somerset Light Infantry; he was promoted from second lieutenant to full lieutenant in 1929. In 1933, he was seconded to the Colonial Service and joined the Royal West African Frontier Force and in 1935 was promoted to be an acting captain. Three years later, in 1938, he was gazetted as a captain and had been promoted to acting major, still within the RWAFF, but at this time his notional "home regiment" was the Glosters. He was promoted to full major within the Glosters in 1943. He retired from the army "on account of disability" and with the honorary rank of colonel in 1948. By the time of his discharge from the British Army he had been awarded the MBE; this was upgraded to an OBE in 1961 when he was cited in the London Gazette as "General Manager of the Ghana Chamber of Mines".

== Cricket career ==
Bean's cricket was limited to a few matches in each about half a dozen seasons for Dorset, and one period of three matches for Somerset in 1929. A right-handed batsman who opened the innings or batted high in the order for Dorset, he was played in the lower middle-order for Somerset. He also bowled leg breaks and googlies. He was not successful in his three first-class matches for Somerset, with a highest score of just 17 in his six innings and a single wicket.
