= Annie Hemingway =

British actress and voice-over artist

- Born: Annie Elizabeth Mary Graham-Brown; 14 December 1985 (age 40); Leicester, Leicestershire, England
- Occupation: Actress
- Years active: 2007–present

Annie Hemingway (born 14 December 1985) is a British actress and voice-over artist. She trained at the Royal Academy of Dramatic Art.

== Career ==
On graduating from the Royal Academy of Dramatic Art (RADA) in 2007 Hemingway played the role of Melissa in the world premiere of Hassan Abdulrassak's Baghdad Wedding at the Soho Theatre and subsequently acted in the BBC Radio 3 dramatisation of the play broadcast on 20 January 2008. She then toured the UK with the Birmingham Repertory Theatre playing the role of Constance Neville in She Stoops to Conquer alongside Liza Goddard. Hemingway went on to perform in the world premiere of Breakfast at Tiffany's at The Theatre Royal Haymarket, directed by Sean Mathias starring Anna Friel. Further productions include Mrs Reynolds and the Ruffian at The Watford Palace Theatre, and Rosaline in the Guildford Shakespeare Company production of Love's Labour's Lost.

In 2011 Hemingway was chosen to represent The Old Vic in New York City as part of its T. S. Eliot US/UK exchange project. She went on to play Rita in the Chichester Festival Theatre world premiere of The Syndicate with Ian McKellen and Fog, a play by Toby Wharton and Tash Fairbanks directed by Ché Walker and produced at Finborough Theatre in 2012. Hemingway is the voice of numerous audiobooks for BBC AudioGo including Witch Crag, Katya's World and Alice: Spooks. In 2013 and 2014 she was one of the ten actors involved in the Spanish Golden Age Season which was a co-production between the Theatre Royal, Bath and the Arcola Theatre directed by Laurence Boswell and Mehmet Ergen.

Her father is the playwright Dougie Blaxland.
