= David Ridley =

English cricketer

Personal information
- Full name: David Anthony Ridley
- Born: 5 May 1954 (age 72); Stourbridge, Worcestershire, England
- Batting: Right-handed
- Role: Wicketkeeper

Domestic team information
- Years: Team
- 1981–1989: Dorset

Career statistics
Competition	LA
Matches	3
Runs scored	18
Batting average	6.00
100s/50s	–/–
Top score	10
Balls bowled	–
Wickets	–
Bowling average	–
5 wickets in innings	–
10 wickets in match	–
Best bowling	–
Catches/stumpings	2/–
- Source: Cricinfo, 23 March 2010

David Anthony Ridley (born 5 May 1954) is a former English cricketer. Ridley was a right-handed batsman who played primarily as a wicketkeeper.

Ridley made his debut for Dorset in the 1979 Minor Counties Championship against Somerset II. He represented Dorset in 34 Minor Counties Championship matches and 12 Minor Counties Trophy matches from 1979 to 1989, with his final Minor Counties match for Dorset coming against Wales Minor Counties.

Ridley trialled at Worcestershire County Cricket Club and played for the 2XI as a batsman/ wicketkeeper.

In 1983, he made his List-A debut for Dorset against Essex in the 1st round of the 1983 NatWest Trophy. Ridley played 2 further List-A matches for Dorset against Somerset in the 1st round of the 1986 NatWest Trophy and against Kent in the 1st round of the 1989 NatWest Trophy.

Ridley took a total of 59 catches and 10 stumpings during his Dorset career.
