= Ian Sanders =

English cricketer

Ian Edward Wakefield Sanders, born 26 February 1961, at Edinburgh, Scotland, played first-class cricket in one match for Cambridge University and List A cricket in one match for Dorset. He was a right-handed batsman and a right-arm medium-fast bowler.

Sanders made his only first-class appearance for Cambridge University in 1984, in a Cambridge side which also featured, in the first of his 17 first-class cricketing appearances, former rugby union star Rob Andrew.

Sanders joined Dorset for the 1985 season, and played in the Minor Counties Championship for the side for this and the 1986 season.

Sanders made his sole List A appearance in the NatWest Trophy match against Somerset. From the lower order, he scored 2 runs, and took figures of 0-20 from four overs of bowling.
