= Michael Wagstaffe =

English cricketer (born 1945)

Personal information
- Full name: Michael Christopher Wagstaffe
- Born: 26 September 1945 (age 81); Kohat, North-West Frontier Province, British India
- Batting: Left-handed
- Bowling: Slow left-arm orthodox

Domestic team information
- Years: Team
- 1981–1988: Dorset
- 1974: Minor Counties South
- 1972–1980: Devon
- 1972: Oxford University

Career statistics
Competition	First-class	List A
Matches	13	5
Runs scored	233	79
Batting average	14.56	19.75
100s/50s	–/–	–/–
Top score	42	34*
Balls bowled	2,239	168
Wickets	28	2
Bowling average	31.07	50.50
5 wickets in innings	–	–
10 wickets in match	–	–
Best bowling	4/96	2/48
Catches/stumpings	5/–	1/–
- Source: Cricinfo, 22 March 2010

Michael Christopher Wagstaffe (born 26 September 1945) is an English former cricketer. He was a left-handed batsman who bowled slow left-arm orthodox. He was born at Kohat in what is now Pakistan.

Wagstaffe made his first-class debut for Oxford University in 1972 against Leicestershire. During 1972 he represented Oxford University in 13 first-class matches, winning a Blue, with his final match being the University Match against Cambridge University. In his 13 first-class matches for the university he scored 233 runs at a batting average of 14.56, with a high score of 42. With the ball he took 28 wickets at a bowling average of 31.07, with best figures of 4/96. Wagstaffe made his debut for Devon in the 1972 Minor Counties Championship against Berkshire. He represented Devon in 64 Minor Counties Championship matches from 1972 to 1980, with his final Minor Counties match for the county coming against the Somerset Second XI.

In 1978, he made his List A debut for Devon against Staffordshire in the 1st round of the 1978 Gillette Cup. Wagstaffe played a further 2 List A matches for the county against Leicestershire in the 1st round of the 1979 Gillette Cup and against Warwickshire in the 2nd round of the 1980 Gillette Cup. Additionally, while playing for Devon, Wagstaffe made a single List A appearance for Minor Counties South in the 1974 Benson and Hedges Cup against Somerset. Wagstaffe made his debut for Dorset in the Minor Counties Championship against Oxfordshire in 1981. He represented Buckinghamshire in 19 Minor County matches from 1981 to 1988, with his final Minor Counties match for Dorset coming against Berkshire. In 1983 he made his only List A appearance for the county in the 1st round of the 1983 NatWest Trophy against Essex.
