= Sean Walbridge =

English cricketer

Personal information
- Full name: Sean Richard Walbridge
- Born: 17 June 1969 (age 57); Weymouth, Dorset, England
- Batting: Right-handed
- Bowling: Slow left-arm orthodox

Domestic team information
- Years: Team
- 1991–2003: Dorset

Career statistics
Competition	LA
Matches	7
Runs scored	19
Batting average	6.33
100s/50s	–/–
Top score	11
Balls bowled	322
Wickets	1
Bowling average	252.00
5 wickets in innings	–
10 wickets in match	–
Best bowling	–
Catches/stumpings	1/34
- Source: Cricinfo, 19 March 2010

Sean Richard Walbridge (born 17 June 1969) is a former English cricketer. Walbridge was a right-handed batsman who bowled slow left-arm orthodox.

In 1991, Walbridge made his debut for Dorset in the Minor Counties Championship against Cornwall. From 1991 to 2003, he represented the county in 73 Minor Counties matches, with his final Minor Counties match for Dorset coming against Wiltshire in 2003.

In 1992, Walbridge made his List-A debut for Dorset against Hampshire in the 1st round of the 1992 NatWest Trophy. Walbridge made 7 List-A appearances for the county between 1992 and 2003, with his final List-A appearance for the county coming against Buckinghamshire in the 1st round of the 2004 Cheltenham & Gloucester Trophy which was played in 2003.
