= Hubert Greenhill =

English cricketer

Personal information
- Full name: Hubert Maclean Greenhill
- Born: 18 September 1881; Christchurch, Hampshire, England
- Died: 22 January 1926 (aged 44); Near Bockhampton, Dorset, England
- Batting: Right-handed
- Bowling: Slow left-arm orthodox

Domestic team information
- Years: Team
- 1901: Hampshire
- 1906–1925: Dorset

Career statistics
Competition	First-class
Matches	2
Runs scored	15
Batting average	6.00
100s/50s	–/–
Top score	5
Balls bowled	145
Wickets	3
Bowling average	25.66
5 wickets in innings	–
10 wickets in match	–
Best bowling	3/39
Catches/stumpings	–/–
- Source: Cricinfo, 7 January 2010

Hubert Maclean Greenhill (19 September 1881 — 22 January 1926) was an English amateur first-class cricketer and British Army officer. As a cricketer, he made two appearances in first-class cricket for Hampshire County Cricket Club. In the army, he served mostly in the Dorset Regiment, seeing action with the regiment in the Second Boer War and First World War.

== Early life and cricket ==
The son of F. M. Greenhill, he was born at Christchurch in September 1881. He was educated at both Wimborne Grammar School and Sherborne School, playing cricket for the latter. In December 1900, he was commissioned as a second lieutenant into the 4th Battalion, Durham Light Infantry. Greenhill made two appearances in first-class cricket for Hampshire in 1901, against the touring South Africans and Derbyshire, with both matches played at Southampton. In 1903, he began his association with Dorset in minor counties cricket, making 55 appearances in the Minor Counties Championship to 1925. He was described by Wisden as a "hard-hitting batsman with a long reach and a good style, and a useful left-handed medium paced bowler" Greenhill was also active in regimental cricket.

== Military career and death ==
Greenhill transferred from the Durham Light Infantry to the Dorset Regiment on in January 1902, joining the regiment in South Africa where it was fighting in the Second Boer War. When war ended in June 1902 with the Peace of Vereeniging, Greenhill left Cape Town with other officers and men of the 2nd Battalion, Dorset Regiment on the SS German in late September 1902, and arrived at Southampton in late October, when they were posted to Portland. He was promoted to lieutenant in October 1904, before resigning his commission in December 1909. By 1914, he had returned to active service with the Dorsetshire Regiment, with him being promoted to captain in May of that year. Greenhill fought during the First World War, with him being seconded for service on the Staff early in the war. In the month prior to the cessation of hostilities, Greenhill was appointed a temporary major whilst employed as a deputy assistant quartermaster general, a rank he relinquished in July 1919.

Following the war, Greenhill fell into depression caused by ill health and a financial worry. He committed suicide by shooting himself in a small woodland near Bockhampton in Dorset on 20 January 1926, whilst in a state of temporary insanity caused by his depression.
