= Ben Lawes =

English cricketer

Personal information
- Full name: Benjamin James Lawes
- Born: 5 April 1982 (age 44); Weymouth, Dorset, England
- Batting: Right-handed
- Bowling: RIght-arm off break

Domestic team information
- Years: Team
- 2001–2008: Dorset

Career statistics
Competition	LA
Matches	3
Runs scored	31
Batting average	10.33
100s/50s	–/–
Top score	20
Balls bowled	–
Wickets	–
Bowling average	–
5 wickets in innings	–
10 wickets in match	–
Best bowling	–
Catches/stumpings	–/–
- Source: Cricinfo, 21 March 2010

Benjamin 'Ben' James Lawes (born 5 April 1982) is a former English cricketer. Lawes was a right-handed batsman who bowled right-arm off break.

Also in 2001, Lawes made his debut for Dorset in the 2001 Minor Counties Championship against Cornwall. From 2001 to 2008, Lawes represented Dorset in 26 Minor Counties Championship matches, with his final Minor Counties appearance for the county coming against Oxfordshire.

Also in 2001, Lawes made his List-A debut for Dorset in the 2nd round of the 2002 Cheltenham & Gloucester Trophy against Scotland which was played in 2001. Lawes played a further 2 List-A matches for the county against the Worcestershire Cricket Board in the 1st round of the 2003 Cheltenham & Gloucester Trophy which was played in 2002 and against Yorkshire in 2nd round of the 2004 Cheltenham & Gloucester Trophy.
