= Graeme Calway =

English cricketer

Personal information
- Full name: Graeme Stuart Calway
- Born: 16 December 1965 (age 60); Yeovil, Somerset, England
- Batting: Right-handed
- Bowling: Right-arm medium

Domestic team information
- Years: Team
- 1986–1994: Dorset
- 1992: Minor Counties

Career statistics
Competition	List A
Matches	9
Runs scored	181
Batting average	20.11
100s/50s	1/0
Top score	105
Balls bowled	328
Wickets	3
Bowling average	93.00
5 wickets in innings	0
10 wickets in match	0
Best bowling	1/10
Catches/stumpings	3/–
- Source: Cricinfo, 17 August 2019

Graeme Stuart Calway (born 16 December 1965) is a former English cricketer. He was a right-handed batsman who bowled right-arm medium pace.

Calway made his debut for Dorset in the 1986 Minor Counties Championship against Wiltshire. From 1986 to 1994, he represented Dorset in 68 Minor Counties Championship matches, with his final appearance for the county coming against Devon in 1994.

In 1987, Calway made his List-A debut for the county against the Hampshire in the 1st round of the 1987 NatWest Trophy. Calway made six List-A appearances for the county from 1987 to 1993, with his final match coming against Surrey in the 1st round of the 1993 NatWest Trophy. He scored 105 against Hampshire in the 1992 NatWest Trophy. In 1992, Calway made three List-A appearances for the Minor Counties in the 1992 Benson & Hedges Cup, playing matches against Sussex, Surrey and Leicestershire.

Calway once bowled an over in the Minor Counties Championship that cost 60 runs. In 1988, Dorset's match against Cheshire was heading for a draw when Calway's captain, Andrew Wingfield Digby, instructed him to bowl 14 consecutive wides, all of which went to the boundary. As a result of the over Cheshire needed 53 from 10 overs instead of 113 from 11 overs, and they went for the runs. In the end Dorset won by 18 runs.

He played a central role in the Minor Counties' one-wicket victory over the touring Pakistanis in a two-day match in 1992, taking four wickets in the first innings and scoring 57 opening the batting in the second innings.

Calway taught at the South African boys' school Michaelhouse for 18 years until 2016, coaching the cricket team.
