= Matthew Mixer =

English cricketer (born 1972)

Matthew Mixer (born 9 December 1972, in North Walsham) is an English former cricketer. He was a left-handed batsman and left-arm medium-fast bowler who played for Dorset.

Mixer made a single List A appearance for the team during the C&G Trophy in August 2003. Mixer did not bat in the match, but bowled 7 overs, taking figures of 0-35.
