= Geoff Hunter (cricketer) =

English cricketer

Geoff Hunter (born Charles Michael Geoffrey Hunter on 11 September 1937 (age 87)) was an English cricketer. He was a right-handed batsman and a right-arm medium-pace bowler who played first-class cricket for the Minor Counties. He was born in Windle, St Helens, Lancashire.

Hunter made a single first-class appearance for the team, during an Indian tour of England in 1971.

Between 1968 and 1973, Hunter picked up five one-day appearances for Dorset and Minor Counties South.
