= Timothy Richings =

English cricketer

Personal information
- Full name: Timothy William Richings
- Born: 21 August 1962 (age 64); Kingston-upon-Thames, Surrey, England
- Batting: Right-handed
- Bowling: Right-arm medium

Domestic team information
- Years: Team
- 1992–1998: Dorset

Career statistics
Competition	LA
Matches	4
Runs scored	128
Batting average	42.66
100s/50s	–/1
Top score	74*
Balls bowled	–
Wickets	–
Bowling average	–
5 wickets in innings	–
10 wickets in match	–
Best bowling	–
Catches/stumpings	–/–
- Source: Cricinfo, 20 March 2010

Timothy 'Tim' William Richings (born 21 August 1962) is a former English cricketer. Richings was a right-handed batsman who bowled right-arm medium pace.

In 1992, Richings made his debut for Dorset in the 1992 Minor Counties Championship against Shropshire. From 1992 to 1998, Richings played 46 Minor County matches for Dorset, with his final match for the county coming against Staffordshire in the final of the 1998 Minor Counties Championship which ended in a draw.

In his debut season, Richings also made his debut and his List-A debut for Dorset against Hampshire in the 1st round of the 1992 NatWest Trophy, where on debut he scored his only List-A half century with a score of 74*. From 1992 to 1998 he represented Dorset in 4 List-A matches, with his final match coming against Hampshire in the 1st round of the 1998 NatWest Trophy.

In his 4 List-A matches for the county he scored 128 runs at a batting average of 42.66.
