= Ian Stuart (cricketer) =

South African cricketer (born 1964)

Personal information
- Full name: Ian Charles Darby Stuart
- Born: 13 October 1964 (age 62); Port Elizabeth, Cape Province, South Africa
- Batting: Right-handed
- Bowling: Right-arm medium

Domestic team information
- Years: Team
- 1982–1989 & 1999: Dorset

Career statistics
Competition	LA
Matches	2
Runs scored	32
Batting average	32.00
100s/50s	–/1
Top score	23*
Balls bowled	102
Wickets	–
Bowling average	–
5 wickets in innings	–
10 wickets in match	–
Best bowling	–
Catches/stumpings	–/–
- Source: Cricinfo, 20 March 2010

Ian Charles Darby Stuart (born 13 October 1964) is a former South African cricketer. Stuart was a right-handed batsman who bowled right-arm medium pace.

In 1982, Stuart made his debut for Dorset in the 1982 Minor Counties Championship against Devon. From 1982 to 1989, Stuart played 39 Minor County matches for Dorset, with his final match for the county coming against Buckinghamshire in the 1989 Minor Counties Championship which ended in a draw.

In 1987, Stuart made his List-A debut for Dorset against Hampshire in the 1st round of the 1987 NatWest Trophy. Ten years after playing his last Minor Counties Championship match for Dorset, Stuart played his second and final List-A match for Dorset against Scotland in the 2nd round of the 1999 NatWest Trophy.
