= Walter McBride =

English cricketer

Personal information
- Full name: Walter Nelson McBride
- Born: 27 November 1904; Croydon, Surrey, England
- Died: 30 January 1974 (aged 69); Ealing, Middlesex, England
- Batting: Left-handed
- Bowling: Right-arm medium

Domestic team information
- Years: Team
- 1925–1928: Oxford University
- 1925–1929: Hampshire
- 1938: Dorset

Career statistics
| Competition | First-class |
|---|---|
| Matches | 47 |
| Runs scored | 656 |
| Batting average | 12.86 |
| 100s/50s | –/1 |
| Top score | 51 |
| Balls bowled | 3,506 |
| Wickets | 56 |
| Bowling average | 31.98 |
| 5 wickets in innings | 2 |
| 10 wickets in match | – |
| Best bowling | 5/57 |
| Catches/stumpings | 31/– |
- Source: Cricinfo, 20 February 2010

Walter Nelson McBride (27 November 1904 — 30 January 1974) was an English first-class cricketer.

The son of Walter Sydney McBride, he was born at Croydon in November 1904. McBride was educated at Westminster School, where he captained the school cricket team in 1924 and was singled out for praise by Wisden Cricketers' Almanack as "the best player in the eleven", and a bowler whose "pace is quite fast". From Westminster, he matriculated to Christ Church, Oxford. There, he made his debut in first-class cricket for Oxford University Cricket Club against Middlesex at Oxford in 1925. He would play for Oxford until 1928, making sixteen first-class appearances; he would have likely made more appearances for Oxford, however his final year in 1928 was limited to two appearances by illness. For his appearance in The University Match against Cambridge University in 1926, he gained a blue. Playing in the Oxford side primarily as a right-arm medium pace bowler, he took 32 wickets at an average of 27.81; he took two five wicket hauls, with best figures of 5 for 57 against the Free Foresters in 1926. It was against the Free Foresters the following year that he made his only first-class half century, with a score of 51. For Oxford, he scored 251 runs at a batting average of 11.40. In addition to playing cricket for Oxford, McBride also played football for Oxford University A.F.C. as a goalkeeper. He played in Oxford's 6–2 victory against Cambridge University A.F.C. in 1927, gaining a football blue.

While studying at Oxford, McBride represented Hampshire during the summer holidays, making his debut for Hampshire against Somerset at Taunton in the 1925 County Championship. He was a regular member of the Hampshire side when he was available to play, making 29 appearances for Hampshire while he was still studying at Oxford; following his graduation, he made just two further appearances in the 1929 County Championship. In his 29 matches, he took 24 wickets at an average of 37.54 and took best figures of 3 for 36. With the bat, he scored 405 runs at a batting average of 13.96 and a highest score of 35. McBride later played minor counties cricket for Dorset, making two appearances in the 1938 Minor Counties Championship against Devon and Cornwall. McBride died at Ealing in January 1974. He was survived by his wife, Molly (1927–2006).
