= Timothy Lamb =

English cricketer (born 1976)

Personal information
- Full name: Timothy Charles Zerrubabel Lamb
- Born: 18 November 1976 (age 49); Salisbury, Wiltshire, England
- Batting: Right-handed
- Role: Wicketkeeper

Domestic team information
- Years: Team
- 1996–2008: Dorset

Career statistics
Competition	LA
Matches	3
Runs scored	15
Batting average	15.00
100s/50s	–/–
Top score	15*
Balls bowled	–
Wickets	–
Bowling average	–
5 wickets in innings	–
10 wickets in match	–
Best bowling	–
Catches/stumpings	2/–
- Source: Cricinfo, 22 March 2010

Timothy Charles Zerrubabel Lamb (born 18 November 1976) is a former English cricketer. Lamb was a right-handed batsman who played primarily as a wicketkeeper.

Lamb represented England Schoolboys at Under 19 level in 1995 and a year later made his debut for Dorset in the 1996 Minor Counties Championship against Devon. Lamb represented Dorset in 60 Minor Counties Championship matches from 1996 to 2008, with his final Minor Counties match for the county coming against Oxfordshire. He captained the side in 2004 after a freak eye injury ruled out the existing captain.

In 1998, Lamb made his List-A debut for Dorset against Hampshire in the 1st round of the 1998 NatWest Trophy. Lamb played 2 further List-A matches for Dorset against Buckinghamshire in the 1st round of the 2004 Cheltenham & Gloucester Trophy which was played in 2003 and against Yorkshire in the 2nd round of the 2004 Cheltenham & Gloucester Trophy.

Timothy Lamb also represented Wasps RFC at Under 19, Academy and 2nd team level between 1995 and 1998. He then moved to London Welsh where he played two second team fixtures and sat on the bench for the 1st team before a shoulder injury put an end to his playing career.
