= Luke Webb (cricketer) =

English cricketer

Personal information
- Full name: Luke Alexander Webb
- Born: 31 December 1995 (age 30); Stoke Mandeville, Buckinghamshire, England
- Batting: Right-handed
- Bowling: Right-arm off break

Domestic team information
- Years: Team
- 2015–2018: Oxford MCCU
- 2013–2018: Dorset

Career statistics
Competition	First-class
Matches	3
Runs scored	68
Batting average	17.00
100s/50s	0/0
Top score	32
Catches/stumpings	1/–
- Source: Cricinfo, 4 October 2018

Luke Alexander Webb (born 31 December 1995) is an English first-class cricketer.

Webb was born at Stoke Mandeville in Buckinghamshire in December 1995, and educated at Gillingham School. He made his debut in minor counties cricket for Dorset, when he played against Shropshire in the Minor Counties Championship. He later studied at Oxford Brookes University, where he made his debut in first-class cricket in April 2015 for Oxford MCCU against Worcestershire; he played a further first-class match later that month against Middlesex. Webb didn't feature for Oxford MCCU in first-class cricket in 2016 or 2017, but did feature in 2018, playing in one match against Kent at Canterbury. Across his three first-class appearances, he scored a total of 68 runs, with a high score of 32. He has featured in all three formats of minor counties cricket for Dorset.
