= Neil Thurgood =

English cricketer

Personal information
- Full name: Neil Jonathan Thurgood
- Born: 18 February 1977 (age 49); Bournemouth, Dorset, England
- Batting: Right-handed
- Bowling: Right-arm fast-medium

Domestic team information
- Years: Team
- 1999–2006: Dorset

Career statistics
Competition	LA
Matches	5
Runs scored	29
Batting average	7.25
100s/50s	–/–
Top score	22
Balls bowled	–
Wickets	–
Bowling average	–
5 wickets in innings	–
10 wickets in match	–
Best bowling	–
Catches/stumpings	1/–
- Source: Cricinfo, 20 March 2010

Neil Jonathan Thurgood (born 18 February 1977) is a former English cricketer. Thurgood was a right-handed batsman who bowled right-arm fast-medium.

In 1999, Thurgood made his debut and his List-A debut for Dorset against Scotland in the 2nd round of the 1999 NatWest Trophy. Thurgood represented the county in 5 List-A matches, with his final List-A match for the county coming against Yorkshire in the 2nd round of the 2004 Cheltenham & Gloucester Trophy.

In 1999, Thurgood made his debut for Dorset in the Minor Counties Championship against Herefordshire. From 1999 to 2006, he represented the county in 36 Minor Counties Championship matches, with his final match for the county coming against Devon in 2006.
