= Roger Miller (cricketer, born 1938) =

English cricketer

Roger Simon Miller (16 February 1938 – 26 April 2013) was an English cricketer. He was a left-handed batsman and right-arm medium-fast bowler who played first-class cricket for Marylebone Cricket Club. He was born in Seaford, Sussex.

Miller made a single first-class appearance for the side, during the 1959 season, against Oxford University. Following this, he made at least eleven appearances for Sussex's Second XI.

Miller made a single List A appearance for Dorset in the 1968 Gillette Cup. He scored 15 not out in the match, and picked up figures of 0-6 from the single over he bowled.

Miller stood unsuccessfully as a Liberal candidate in Horncastle at the 1970 general election and in Weston-super-Mare four years later.

He taught history at Sunningdale School in Berkshire.
