= Giles Reynolds =

English cricketer

Personal information
- Full name: Giles Denys Reynolds
- Born: 13 July 1967 (age 59); Mönchengladbach, North Rhine-Westphalia, West Germany
- Batting: Right-handed
- Role: Substitute

Domestic team information
- Years: Team
- 1989–2000: Dorset
- 1988–1989: Oxford University

Career statistics
Competition	FC	LA
Matches	12	7
Runs scored	294	134
Batting average	19.60	22.33
100s/50s	–/1	–/1
Top score	69	60
Balls bowled	–	–
Wickets	–	–
Bowling average	–	–
5 wickets in innings	–	–
10 wickets in match	–	–
Best bowling	–	–
Catches/stumpings	10/2	2/–
- Source: Cricinfo, 23 March 2010

Giles Denys Reynolds (born 13 July 1967) is an English former cricketer. Reynolds was a right-handed batsman who played as a wicketkeeper.

Reynolds made his first-class debut for Oxford University in 1988 against Leicestershire. From 1988 to 1989, he 12 first-class matches for the university, with his final first-class match coming in the 1989 University Match against Cambridge University.

In his 12 first-class matches for the university he scored 294 runs at a batting average of 19.60, with a single half-century score of 69 against Kent in 1988. Behind the stumps he took 10 catches and made 2 stumpings.

Reynolds made his debut for Dorset in the 1989 Minor Counties Championship against Oxfordshire. He represented Dorset in 65 Minor Counties Championship matches from 1989 to 1999, with his final Minor Counties match for Dorset coming against Wiltshire.

In 1990, he made his List-A debut for Dorset against Glamorgan in the 1st round of the 1991 NatWest Trophy. Reynolds represented Dorset in 7 List-A matches from 1991 to 2000, with his final List-A match for the county coming against Glamorgan in the 3rd round of the 2000 NatWest Trophy.

In his 7 List-A matches for the county he scored 134 runs at an average of 22.33, with a single half century score of 60 on debut against Glamorgan in 1990.
