= Geoffrey Ogilvy =

English cricketer

Personal information
- Full name: Geoffrey Littlejohn Ogilvy
- Born: 25 January 1906; Lewisham, London, England
- Died: 20 January 1962 (aged 55); Dreemskerry, Maughold, Isle of Man
- Batting: Right-handed
- Role: Batsman

Domestic team information
- Years: Team
- 1936: Somerset
- First-class debut: 10 June 1936 Somerset v Sussex
- Last First-class: 30 June 1936 Somerset v Cambridge University

Career statistics
| Competition | First-class |
|---|---|
| Matches | 2 |
| Runs scored | 44 |
| Batting average | 14.66 |
| 100s/50s | –/– |
| Top score | 29 |
| Balls bowled | – |
| Wickets | – |
| Bowling average | – |
| 5 wickets in innings | – |
| 10 wickets in match | – |
| Best bowling | – |
| Catches/stumpings | 1/– |
- Source: CricketArchive, 20 March 2011

Geoffrey Littlejohn Ogilvy (25 January 1906 – 20 January 1962) played first-class cricket for Somerset in two matches in the 1936 season. He was born at Lewisham in London and died at Dreemskerry, Maughold, Isle of Man.

Educated at St Bees School, Ogilvy was a right-handed middle-order batsman. He played in several Minor Counties matches for Dorset in 1931 and 1932. His two first-class matches for Somerset were both in June 1936. Against Sussex he batted at No 4 and scored 29 and 3. But later in the month he was at No 10 in the game against Cambridge University, scoring 12 in what was his last first-class innings.
