= Philip Hope =

English cricketer

Personal information
- Full name: Philip Palmer Hope
- Born: 10 February 1889; Hartlepool, County Durham, England
- Died: 19 May 1962 (aged 73); Clifton, Bristol, England
- Batting: Right-handed
- Bowling: Right-arm fast-medium
- Role: Batsman

Domestic team information
- Years: Team
- 1914–25: Somerset
- First-class debut: 9 May 1914 Somerset v Surrey
- Last First-class: 9 June 1925 Somerset v Essex

Career statistics
Competition	First-class
Matches	41
Runs scored	1048
Batting average	15.18
100s/50s	–/7
Top score	77
Balls bowled	177
Wickets	1
Bowling average	145.00
5 wickets in innings	–
10 wickets in match	–
Best bowling	1/17
Catches/stumpings	16/–
- Source: CricketArchive, 6 September 2010

Philip Palmer Hope (10 February 1889 – 19 May 1962) played first-class cricket for Somerset from 1914 to 1925. He was born at Hartlepool, County Durham, and died at Clifton, Bristol.

Hope was a right-handed middle or lower order batsman and an occasional right-arm fast-medium bowler. He was educated at Sherborne School and played Minor Counties cricket for Dorset up to 1913.

His first-class cricket for Somerset was restricted largely to three seasons, 1914, 1919 and 1921, though in each of these he was a fairly regular member of the side. In 1914, his one substantial innings was 65 against Derbyshire at Chesterfield. Earlier, by making 18, he had contributed exactly half the runs made from the bat in the second innings against Hampshire at Bath.

Hope returned to first-class cricket for a dozen games in 1919 and improved his personal best by scoring 68 in the match against Gloucestershire at Taunton. This was the match in which Sydney Rippon, with whom Hope shared a 99-run first innings partnership that set Somerset on course to victory, played under an assumed name. Hope did not play in 1920, but returned to Somerset for a further dozen games in 1921, when he again improved his highest score, this time scoring 77, more than double the second highest score, in the match against Essex at Bath.

After 1921 Hope left regular first-class cricket, making just one further appearance for Somerset in the 1925 season.
