= Walter Lancashire =

English cricketer

Personal information
- Full name: Walter Lancashire
- Born: 28 October 1903; Hemsworth, Yorkshire, England
- Died: 7 June 1981 (aged 77); Dorchester, Dorset, England
- Batting: Right-handed
- Bowling: Right-arm medium

Domestic team information
- Years: Team
- 1935–1937: Hampshire
- 1946–1950: Dorset

Career statistics
Competition	First-class
Matches	18
Runs scored	471
Batting average	16.82
100s/50s	–/2
Top score	66
Balls bowled	531
Wickets	7
Bowling average	51.00
5 wickets in innings	–
10 wickets in match	–
Best bowling	2/49
Catches/stumpings	7/–
- Source: Cricinfo, 14 January 2010

Walter Lancashire (28 October 1903 — 7 June 1981) was an English amateur first-class cricketer of the 1930s and a schoolteacher.

Lancashire was born in October 1903 at Hemsworth, Yorkshire. He was educated at Rotherham Grammar School, before matriculating to Sheffield University, where he captained the cricket and football teams. After graduating from Sheffield, he became a schoolmaster, and was initially a sports and maths master in Southampton at Taunton's School. He played football for Southampton F.C., having been signed in 1927. A centre-back, he played only for the reserves. In Southampton, he also played club cricket for Deanery Cricket Club. Following success at club level, he began playing as an amateur for Hampshire's club and ground team.

Lancashire eventually made his debut in first-class cricket for Hampshire against Somerset in the 1935 County Championship at Taunton, debuting alongside Arthur Holt. He made six appearances in 1935, before making a further eight in the 1936 County Championship. He played for Hampshire until the 1937 County Championship, in which he made four appearances. In eighteen first-class matches for Hampshire, he scored 471 runs at an average of 16.82; he made two half centuries, with a highest score of 66. With the ball, he took 7 wickets with his medium pace bowling, with best figures of 2 for 49.

During the Second World War, he was evacuated along with the pupils of Taunton's School to Bournemouth. He would return to Southampton during the war to play club cricket for Deanery. Following the war, he took up a teaching post at The Thomas Hardye School in Dorchester. Lancashire began playing minor counties cricket for Dorset in 1946, with him being elected Dorset captain in 1947. He remained captain until his final season in 1950, having represented Dorset in 45 Minor Counties Championship matches. In Dorset, he played his club cricket for Dorchester. Lancashire died in Dorchester on 7 June 1981.
