= Martin Miller (cricketer, born 1972) =

English cricketer

Personal information
- Full name: Martin Graham Miller
- Born: Poole, Dorset, England
- Batting: Right-handed
- Role: Wicket-keeper

Domestic team information
- Years: Team
- 1995–2003: Dorset

Career statistics
Competition	List A
Matches	7
Runs scored	150
Batting average	25.00
100s/50s	0/1
Top score	81
Catches/stumpings	6/2
- Source: Cricinfo, 21 March 2010

Martin Graham Miller (born 1972) is a former English cricketer. Miller was a right-handed batsman who played primarily as a wicketkeeper.

Miller made his debut for Dorset in the 1995 Minor Counties Championship against Herefordshire. From 1995 to 2003, Miller represented Dorset in 41 Minor Counties Championship matches, with his final Minor Counties appearance for the county coming against Oxfordshire.

In 1999, Miller made his List-A debut for Dorset in the 1999 NatWest Trophy against Scotland. From 1999 to 2003, Miller played 7 List-A matches for the county, with his final List-A match coming against Buckinghamshire in the 1st round of the 2004 Cheltenham & Gloucester Trophy which was played in 2003.

In his 7 List-A matches for Dorset, he scored 150 runs at a batting average of 25.00. Miller made a single half century in List-A matches, which came against Glamorgan in 2000. A wicketkeeper, Miller took 6 catches and made 2 stumpings.
