= Mark Hardwicke =

English cricketer and rugby player

Personal information
- Born: 22 August 1936; Weymouth, Dorset, England
- Died: 23 May 1988 (aged 51); Weymouth, Dorset, England
- Batting: Right-handed
- Bowling: Leg break

Domestic team information
- Years: Team
- 1955–1971: Dorset

Career statistics
Competition	List A
Matches	1
Runs scored	4
Batting average	4.00
100s/50s	0/0
Top score	4
Catches/stumpings	0/–
- Source: Cricinfo, 15 March 2010

Mark Hardwicke (22 August 1936 – 23 May 1988) was an English List A cricketer and rugby player. Hardwicke was a right-handed batsman who was a leg break bowler.

Hardwicke made his debut for Dorset in the 1955 Minor Counties Championship against the Somerset Second XI. From 1955 to 1971 he represented Dorset in 149 Minor Counties matches, with his final match for the county coming against Oxfordshire in the 1971 season. From 1967 to 1971 Hardwicke captained Dorset. In 1968 Hardwicke played his only List A match for Dorset against Bedfordshire in the 1968 Gillette Cup.

== Rugby career ==
Hardwicke also played rugby for the Harlequins, Oxford University, Dorset and Wiltshire.

== Death ==
Hardwicke died at Weymouth, Dorset on 23 May 1988.
