= Michael Doggrell =

English cricketer

Michael Doggrell (1935–1988) was an English cricketer. He was a right-handed batsman and right-arm medium-fast bowler who played for Dorset. He was born in Salisbury, Wiltshire.

Doggrell made his debut for the team in the Minor Counties Championship in 1955, and continued to represent the team in the competition until 1970. He made a single List A appearance, in the 1968 Gillette Cup competition, against Bedfordshire.

A tailend batsman, Doggrell scored a duck and took figures of 0–15 from seven overs of bowling.
