= Peter Badham =

English cricketer (1911–1983)

Personal information
- Full name: Peter Henry Christopher Badham
- Born: 11 February 1911; Bagworth, Leicestershire, England
- Died: 10 April 1983 (aged 72); Upton, Dorset, England
- Batting: Right-handed
- Bowling: Right-arm medium

Domestic team information
- Years: Team
- 1937–1947: Dorset
- 1934: Oxford University
- 1933–1934: Buckinghamshire
- 1933: Leicestershire

Career statistics
Competition	First-class
Matches	4
Runs scored	67
Batting average	11.16
100s/50s	–/–
Top score	38
Balls bowled	744
Wickets	10
Bowling average	31.10
5 wickets in innings	–
10 wickets in match	–
Best bowling	4/70
Catches/stumpings	4/–
- Source: Cricinfo, 4 May 2011

Peter Henry Christopher Badham (11 February 1911 – 10 April 1983) was an English cricketer. Badham was a right-handed batsman who bowled right-arm medium pace. He was born in Bagworth, Leicestershire and educated at Winchester College, where he played for the college cricket team.

Badham made his first-class debut for Leicestershire against Oxford University in 1933, which was his only first-class appearance for his home county. The following year he played 3 further first-class matches for Oxford University, the last coming against a combined Minor Counties team. In his 4 career first-class matches, he scored 67 runs at a batting average of 11.16, with a high score of 38.

The same season he played for Leicestershire also saw him make his Minor Counties Championship debut for Buckinghamshire, a team he played Minor counties cricket for through to the end of the 1934 season. He later joined Dorset, making his debut for the county in the 1937 Minor Counties Championship against Oxfordshire. He played for Dorset up to 1939, also playing for them in 1946 and 1947 following the end of the Second World War.

He died in Upton, Dorset on 10 April 1983.
