= Toby Sharpe =

English cricketer

Personal information
- Full name: Toby John Sharpe
- Born: 5 July 1981 (age 45); Camden, London, England
- Batting: Right-handed
- Bowling: Right-arm fast-medium

Domestic team information
- Years: Team
- 2001–2003: Oxford UCCE
- 1999–2001 & 2005: Dorset

Career statistics
Competition	FC	LA
Matches	7	1
Runs scored	27	0
Batting average	5.40	0.00
100s/50s	–/–	–/–
Top score	10*	0
Balls bowled	1,044	60
Wickets	10	1
Bowling average	67.60	56.00
5 wickets in innings	–	–
10 wickets in match	–	–
Best bowling	3/70	1/56
Catches/stumpings	2/–	–/–
- Source: Cricinfo, 22 March 2010

Toby John Sharpe (born 5 July 1981) is a former English cricketer. Sharpe was a right-handed batsman who bowled right-arm fast-medium.

Sharpe made his debut for Dorset in the 1999 Minor Counties Championship against Cornwall. Sharpe represented Dorset in 16 Minor Counties Championship matches from 1999 to 2001, with his final Minor Counties match for the county coming against Berkshire. In 2000, Sharpe played his only List-A match for Dorset against Glamorgan in the 2000 NatWest Trophy.

In 2001, Sharpe made his first-class debut for Oxford UCCE against Middlesex. From 2001 to 2002, he played 7 first-class matches for the team, with his final first-class match coming against Worcestershire. In his 7 first-class matches for the county he took 10 wickets at a bowling average of 67.60, with best figures of 3/70.

In 2005, joined Wiltshire where he represented the county in 2 Minor Counties matches against Berkshire and Cheshire.
