= Michael Beale (cricketer) =

English cricketer

Michael Beale (born 7 April 1947) was an English cricketer. He was a right-handed batsman and wicket-keeper who played for Dorset. He was born in Sturminster Newton, Dorset.

Beale, who made his Second XI Championship debut in 1966, made his debut in the Gillette Cup in 1968, against Bedfordshire. He scored just three runs in the match as Dorset fell to a heavy defeat. He played for ESCA in 1965 and 66 and the MCC Schools in 1966.

Beale continued to represent Dorset in the Minor Counties Championship until, in 1977, he had the opportunity to again represent the team in a List A match. He once again struggled with the bat, picking up a duck from third in the batting order. He played over 100 games for Dorset serving as vice captain for three years until he moved to Scotland to play for Perthshire in 1979.
