= Barry Lewis (cricketer) =

English cricketer

Personal information
- Full name: Victor Barry Lewis
- Born: 9 December 1952 (age 73); Sherborne, Dorset, England
- Batting: Right-handed
- Role: Wicketkeeper

Domestic team information
- Years: Team
- 1971–1992: Dorset

Career statistics
Competition	LA
Matches	6
Runs scored	25
Batting average	5.00
100s/50s	–/–
Top score	11
Balls bowled	–
Wickets	–
Bowling average	–
5 wickets in innings	–
10 wickets in match	–
Best bowling	–
Catches/stumpings	1/–
- Source: Cricinfo, 20 March 2010

Victor Barry Lewis (born 9 December 1952) was an English cricketer. Lewis was a right-handed batsman who played primarily as a wicketkeeper.

Lewis made his debut for Dorset in the 1971 Minor Counties Championship against Oxfordshire. From 1971 to 1992, Lewis played 149 Minor Counties matches for Dorset, with his final appearance for the county coming against Wales Minor Counties in 1992.

In 1983, Lewis made his List-A debut for Dorset against Essex in the 1st round of the 1983 NatWest Trophy. From 1983 to 1992, Treagus represented Dorset in 6 List-A matches, with his final List-A match for the county coming against Hampshire in the 1st round of the 1992 NatWest Trophy.

Barry now runs his own business, V B Lewis Building Design Ltd out of offices in Sturminster Newton, Dorset.
