= Matthew Swarbrick =

English cricketer

Personal information
- Born: 8 August 1977 (age 49); Stockport, Greater Manchester, England
- Batting: Right-handed

Domestic team information
- Years: Team
- 1995–2005: Dorset

Career statistics
Competition	List A
Matches	5
Runs scored	40
Batting average	10.00
100s/50s	0/0
Top score	24
Catches/stumpings	0/–
- Source: Cricinfo, 16 March 2010

Matthew Swarbrick (born 8 August 1977) is a former English cricketer. Swarbrick is a right-handed batsman.

Swarbrick made his debut for Dorset in the 1995 Minor Counties Championship against Herefordshire. From 1995 to 2005 Swarbrick represented Dorset in 48 Minor Counties matches, with his final match coming against Wales Minor Counties.

Swarbrick also represented Dorset in List-A cricket, making his List-A debut for Dorset in the 1st round of the 1998 NatWest Trophy against Hampshire. From 1998 to 2003 Swarbrick played 5 List-A matches for Dorset, with his final List-A match coming against Buckinghamshire in the 1st round of the 2004 Cheltenham & Gloucester Trophy which was played in 2003.

Swarbrick now represents Tilford CC, one of Surrey's premier cricket clubs, in the I'anson league, where he captains the 3rd XI in Division 7. His average in Division 7 is significantly higher than his List A record.
