= Patrick Barrow =

English cricketer (1893–1974)

Patrick Lindsay Barrow (22 January 1893 – 7 May 1974) was an English cricketer. He was a left-handed batsman who played first-class cricket for Essex in the 1922 season. He was born in Plaistow, educated at Wellington School, Somerset and the University of Cambridge. He died in Adstock.

Barrow had previously played four Minor Counties Championship matches for Dorset between 1913 and 1920, but got his only opportunity for first-class cricket in the 1922 season, playing against the Combined Services. From the lower order, Barrow scored a duck in the first innings, and took just one wicket with the ball.

He was also known as a composer and conductor of light orchestral music. During the First World War, Barrow served in the Worcestershire Regiment, the Machine Gun Corps and as a Staff Officer responsible for the interrogation of prisoners of war. Following the war he was, for a short time, the British Vice Consul at Frankfurt. before earning a living as a theatre musical director.

During the Second World War Patrick Barrow served as an intelligence officer in the Royal Air Force. He conducted the Central Band of the RAF several times, and shortly after the war had the "extraordinary experience of conducting the Cologne and Bielefeld Symphony Orchestras when they performed (his) 'Coventry Suite' to German audiences in bomb-damaged concert premises." His work 'Elegy', composed in the Operations Room of RAF Pocklington in 1941, was performed at the Battle of Britain Service in Westminster Abbey in 1949.
