= Julian Shackleton =

English cricketer

Personal information
- Full name: Julian Howard Shackleton
- Born: 29 January 1952 (age 74); Todmorden, Yorkshire, England
- Batting: Right-handed
- Bowling: Right-arm medium
- Role: Bowler
- Relatives: Derek Shackleton (Father)

Domestic team information
- Years: Team
- 1989–1998: Dorset
- 1971–1978: Gloucestershire

Career statistics
Competition	FC	LA
Matches	48	81
Runs scored	596	171
Batting average	13.54	9.00
100s/50s	0/0	0/0
Top score	41*	19*
Balls bowled	4,348	3,751
Wickets	49	67
Bowling average	45.75	35.52
5 wickets in innings	0	1
10 wickets in match	0	0
Best bowling	4/38	5/20
Catches/stumpings	36/–	19/–
- Source: Cricinfo, 20 March 2010

Julian Howard Shackleton (born 29 January 1952) is a former English cricketer. Shackleton was a right-handed batsman who bowled right-arm medium pace.

== Cricket career ==
=== Gloucestershire ===
Shackleton made his first-class debut for Gloucestershire against Surrey in the 1971 County Championship. Shackleton played 48 first-class matches for the county, with his final first-class match coming against Lancashire in 1978. In his 48 first-class matches he scored 596 runs at a batting average of 13.54, with a high score of 46*. With the ball he took 49 wickets at a bowling average of 45.75, with best figures of 4/38. In the field he took 36 catches for Gloucestershire in first-class matches.

In the same year that he made his first-class debut for Gloucestershire, he made his List A debut for the county against Hampshire. Shackleton made 75 List A appearances for Gloucestershire from 1971 to 1978, with his final List A match for the county coming against Leicestershire in 1978. Shackleton took 66 wickets for the county at an average of 33.59, with best figures of 5/20 against Surrey in July 1977. A week earlier he had played in the final of 1977 Benson & Hedges Cup which Gloucestershire won by beating Kent.

=== Move to Dorset ===
Eleven years after leaving Gloucestershire, Shackleton joined Dorset, making his debut for the county in the 1989 Minor Counties Championship against Cheshire. Shackleton played 61 Minor Counties matches for Dorset, with his final match for the county coming against Staffordshire in the final of the 1998 Minor Counties Championship, which ended in a draw.

In 1990 Shackleton made his List A debut for Dorset against Glamorgan in the first round of the 1990 NatWest Trophy. Shackleton played six List A matches for Dorset, with his final List A match for the county coming against Hampshire in 1998 NatWest Trophy. Shackleton had a disappointing time with the ball in his List A career for Dorset, taking only one wicket at an average of 163.00.

=== Coaching ===
Since the end of his playing career, Shackleton became a cricket coach at Canford School.

== Family ==
Shackleton's father Derek Shackleton played Test cricket for England. He also played 585 first-class matches for Hampshire taking 2,669 wickets, a county record.
