= David Bulfield =

English cricketer (1938–2025)

Personal information
- Full name: David Alfred Bulfield
- Born: 15 January 1938; Lancaster, England
- Died: 22 January 2025 (aged 87)
- Batting: Right-handed
- Bowling: Right-arm leg-break
- Role: Batsman

Domestic team information
- Years: Team
- 1973: Dorset

Career statistics
Competition	List A
Matches	1
Runs scored	5
Batting average	5.00
100s/50s	0/0
Top score	5
Catches/stumpings	0/–
- Source: Cricinfo, 11 February 2025

David Alfred Bulfield (15 January 1938 – 22 January 2025) was an English cricketer. Born in Lancaster, Bulfield was a right-handed batsman and a leg-break bowler who had a long career with Dorset in the Minor Counties Championship.

Debuting for Dorset in 1956, at the age of 18, Bulfield made a single List A appearance, in a Gillette Cup match against Staffordshire on 30 June 1973. Opening the batting, Bulfield scored 5 runs as Dorset lost by 79 runs.

Outside of his cricketing career, Bulfield was a teacher, becoming a master at Downside School.

Bulfield died on 22 January 2025, survived by his wife Valerie.
