= Stuart Rintoul =

English cricketer

Personal information
- Full name: Stuart William Douglas Rintoul
- Born: 25 March 1968 (age 58); Poole, Dorset, England
- Batting: Right-handed

Domestic team information
- Years: Team
- 1986–2004: Dorset

Career statistics
Competition	List A
Matches	10
Runs scored	184
Batting average	23.00
100s/50s	0/1
Top score	55
Catches/stumpings	1/–
- Source: Cricinfo, 17 March 2010

Stuart William Douglas Rintoul (born 25 March 1968) is a former English cricketer. Rintoul was a right-handed batsman.

Rintoul made his debut for Dorset County Cricket Club in the 1986 Minor Counties Championship against Buckinghamshire. From 1986 to 2004 Rintoul represented Dorset in 103 Minor Counties matches, with his final match Minor Counties match for Dorset coming against Berkshire in 2004.

Rintoul also played 10 List-A matches for Dorset, with his debut List-A match coming against Kent in the 1st round of the 1989 NatWest Trophy. Hall played 8 further List-A matches for Dorset, with his final List-A match for the county coming in the 1st round of the 2004 Cheltenham & Gloucester Trophy against Buckinghamshire which was played in 2003.

In his 10 List-A matches for Dorset he scored 184 runs at a batting average of 23.00, with a single half century score of 55 against the Worcestershire Cricket Board in 2002.
