= Reginald Swalwell =

English cricketer

Cricket information
- Batting: Left-handed

Career statistics
Competition	First-class
Matches	26
Runs scored	665
Batting average	15.46
100s/50s	0/2
Top score	72
Balls bowled	258
Wickets	3
Bowling average	52.00
5 wickets in innings	0
10 wickets in match	0
Best bowling	3/49
Catches/stumpings	8/0
- Source: Cricinfo, 16 August 2022

Reginald Sawdon Swalwell (25 June 1873 – 20 September 1930) was an English first-class cricketer who played 26 matches between 1907 and 1926: 18 for Worcestershire County Cricket Club, seven for the Marylebone Cricket Club (MCC) and one for the Gentlemen of England.

Born in York, Swalwell appeared for Yorkshire's Second XI on a number of occasions just after the turn of the 20th century, in separate matches scoring 109 and 100 against Surrey's Second XI, but it was not until 1907 that he made his first-class debut, for Worcestershire against Yorkshire in the County Championship at New Road. He made 35 and 14 in Worcestershire's 54-run victory, and played five further matches that summer, his top score being 40 in a loss to Oxford University. Swalwell played six times in 1908, hitting 57 against Oxford University, but then did not appear again in first-class cricket until 1913, playing five times in total in that and the following season, four games being for Worcestershire and one for MCC.

After the First World War, he played a single match for Worcestershire in 1920, then played on for several years for MCC, making a career-best 72 against Cambridge University in 1921. Swalwell also made one appearance for Gentlemen of England against the Combined Services in 1920, and in this game he took all his three first-class wickets (Tom Jameson, Charles Blount and Noel Carbutt). His final first-class game was for MCC against Wales in 1925: he made 0 and 5, and his nine wicketless overs cost 45 runs.

Outside cricket, Swalwell reached the rank of major in the Army. He died at Broomhall, Sunningdale, Berkshire at the age of 57.
