= Andrew Marsh (cricket) =

English cricketer

Personal information
- Full name: Andrew Michael Marsh
- Born: 1 November 1952 (age 74); Bridport, Dorset, England
- Batting: Right-handed
- Bowling: Slow left-arm orthodox

Domestic team information
- Years: Team
- 1973–1987: Dorset

Career statistics
Competition	List A
Matches	1
Runs scored	1
Batting average	1.00
100s/50s	–/–
Top score	1
Balls bowled	72
Wickets	0
Bowling average	–
5 wickets in innings	–
10 wickets in match	–
Best bowling	–
Catches/stumpings	–/–
- Source: Cricinfo, 21 September 2023

Andrew Marsh (born 1 November 1952) was an English cricketer. He was a right-handed batsman and slow left-arm bowler who played for Dorset. He was born in Bridport, Dorset.

== Career ==
Marsh made a single List A appearance for the team, during the 1973 Gillette Cup, against Staffordshire. From the lower order, he scored a single run, and took bowling figures of 0–33.

Following a single appearance for the team in the 1973 Minor Counties championship, he did not appear again in the competition until 1986.
