= Martin Ford (cricketer) =

English cricketer

Martin Ford (born 13 December 1978) was an English cricketer. He was a right-handed batsman and a right-arm fast bowler who played for Dorset. He was born in Bournemouth, Dorset.

Ford made his Second XI Trophy debut in 2003, and made his only List A appearance the following season, in a heavy defeat at the hands of Yorkshire in the C&G Trophy.

Ford continued to represent Dorset on a regular basis between 2005 and 2007, and made two appearances for the team during the 2008 season.
