= Marko Perinović =

Croatian rower

Personal information
- Nationality: Croatian
- Born: 29 October 1970 (age 54); Zadar, Croatia

Sport
- Sport: Rowing

Marko Perinović (born 29 October 1970) is a Croatian rower. He competed in the men's coxless pair event at the 1992 Summer Olympics.
