= Andrew Wingfield Digby =

English cricketer & clergyman (born 1950)

Personal information
- Full name: Andrew Richard Wingfield Digby
- Born: 27 July 1950 (age 76); Sherborne, Dorset, England
- Batting: Left-handed
- Bowling: Right-arm medium

Domestic team information
- Years: Team
- 1989: Minor Counties
- 1971–1978: Combined Universities
- 1972–1992: Dorset
- 1971–1977: Oxford University

Career statistics
Competition	First-class	List A
Matches	39	15
Runs scored	720	68
Batting average	12.41	6.80
100s/50s	0/3	0/0
Top score	69	23*
Balls bowled	6,716	912
Wickets	96	14
Bowling average	33.87	43.92
5 wickets in innings	4	0
10 wickets in match	0	–
Best bowling	5/79	3/28
Catches/stumpings	20/–	1/–
- Source: Cricinfo, 5 April 2010

Rev. Canon Andrew Richard Wingfield Digby (born 27 July 1950) is a Church of England priest and former English cricketer. Wingfield Digby was a left-handed batsman who bowled right-arm medium pace. He served as vicar of St Andrew's Church, Oxford.

== Education ==
Wingfield Digby was educated at Sherborne School and then at Keble College and Wycliffe Hall, both in Oxford.

== Cricket career ==
=== Oxford University ===
Wingfield Digby made his first-class debut for Oxford University against Warwickshire in 1972. He played 39 first-class matches for the University, his final first-class match coming against Cambridge University in 1977. In his 39 first-class matches he scored 720 runs at a batting average of 12.41, with three half-centuries and a high score of 69 against Sussex in 1975. With the ball he took 96 wickets at a bowling average of 33.87, with four five wicket hauls and best figures of 5/79 against Warwickshire, on debut. In the field he took 20 catches.

In 1975, he made his List A debut for the Combined Universities against Worcestershire in the Benson and Hedges Cup. Wingfield Digby made nine List-A appearances for the Combined Universities from 1975 to 1977, his final List A match coming against Nottinghamshire in the 1977 Benson and Hedges Cup. He took 11 wickets for the team at an average of 29.18, with best figures of 3/28.

=== Dorset ===
Wingfield Digby made his Dorset debut in 1972, playing a single match for the county in the Minor Counties Championship against Wiltshire. Resuming in 1976, Wingfield Digby played 69 Minor Counties matches for Dorset, his final match coming against Buckinghamshire in the 1990 Minor Counties Championship.

In 1986 he made his List A debut for Dorset against Somerset in the first round of the NatWest Trophy. He played five List A matches for Dorset, his final match coming against Hampshire in the 1992 NatWest Trophy. He had a lean time with the ball, taking only two wickets at an average of 136.00. He also represented the Minor Counties in a single List A match against Somerset in the 1989 Benson and Hedges Cup.

Wingfield Digby captained Dorset in 1988 when they won their first trophy, the Minor Counties one-day competition, beating Cambridgeshire by two wickets in the final. He attracted widespread controversy during the season when he instructed one of his bowlers to bowl 14 consecutive wides, conceding 60 runs, including 56 extras, in an over, in order to turn a Minor Counties Championship match against Cheshire that had been heading for a draw into a close contest. As a result of the over Cheshire needed 53 from 10 overs instead of 113 from 11 overs, and they went for the runs. In the end Dorset won by 18 runs.

=== Other cricket ===
Wingfield Digby twice scored centuries in the Church Times Cricket Cup Final to win the competition for the Oxford team: 104 not out in 1994 and 106 in 1997.

== Religious work ==
Wingfield Digby studied theology at Oxford University. In 1977, he took on a curate's post at Christ Church, Cockfosters, before ministering to Christ Church's "daughter church", St Paul's, Hadley Wood, from 1981. In 1984 he became the first paid employee of Christians in Sport as their National Director.

In 1988, Wingfield Digby served as chaplain at the Seoul Olympics. Between 1991 and 2001 he was official chaplain to the English cricket team, having been appointed to the post by Ted Dexter, who created the position. He toured with the team regularly, including trips to India and Australia.

In 2002, Wingfield Digby left Christians in Sport to become the vicar at St Andrew's Church, Oxford. He was one of the chaplains to the 2012 London Olympics. He has retired from full-time work and is now the associate minister at St Mary's in Swinbrook, Oxfordshire, and associate vicar at St John the Baptist in Burford, Oxfordshire.

== Books ==
Wingfield Digby is the author of A Loud Appeal: Playing by God's Rules (Hodder & Stoughton, 1988) and Go For It! Sports New Testament (International Bible Society, 1996) and co-author with Stuart Weir of Winning is Not Enough: Sports Stars Who are Going for Gold – and God (Marshall Pickering, 1991).

== Family ==
Wingfield Digby and his wife Sue have three children. Wingfield Digby's older brother Nicholas also represented Dorset in Minor Counties cricket.
