= Derek Shackleton =

English cricketer (1924–2007)

- Shackleton in 1965

Personal information
- Born: 12 August 1924; Todmorden, Yorkshire, England
- Died: 28 September 2007 (aged 83); Canford Magna, Dorset, England
- Batting: Right-handed
- Bowling: Right-arm medium
- Role: Bowler
- Relatives: Julian Shackleton (Son)

International information
- National side: England
- Test debut (cap 350): 20 July 1950 v West Indies
- Last Test: 22 August 1963 v West Indies

Domestic team information
- Years: Team
- 1948–1969: Hampshire
- 1950–1957: Marylebone Cricket Club
- 1973: Dorset

Career statistics
Competition	Test	FC	LA
Matches	7	647	37
Runs scored	113	9,574	104
Batting average	18.83	14.61	13.00
100s/50s	–/–	–/20	–/–
Top score	42	87*	20
Balls bowled	2,078	159,043	2,070
Wickets	18	2,857	41
Bowling average	42.66	18.65	21.26
5 wickets in innings	–	194	–
10 wickets in match	–	38	–
Best bowling	4/72	9/30	4/11
Catches/stumpings	1/–	221/–	9/–
- Source: Cricinfo, 23 August 2009

Derek Shackleton (12 August 1924 – 28 September 2007) was a Hampshire and England bowler. He took over 100 wickets in 20 consecutive seasons of first-class cricket, but only played in seven Tests for England. He has the seventh-highest tally of first-class wickets, and the most first-class wickets of any player who began his career after World War II. He holds the record for the most first-class wickets taken by any Hampshire player.

After his cricket playing career ended, Shackleton became a coach and umpire for several seasons.

The cricket writer, Colin Bateman, noted of Shackleton, "his bowling, like his hair, always seemed immaculate".

== Early life ==
Shackleton was born in Todmorden, on the border between Lancashire and Yorkshire in England. Both of his parents were weavers. He was educated at Roomfield School, where he played cricket and football.

== Cricket career ==
Shackleton began his career in the Yorkshire and Lancashire leagues as an all-rounder bowling some medium pace, but decided to concentrate on leg spin. He was also signed by Burnley F.C. as a goalkeeper. He joined the Army in 1942, entering the Pioneer Corps, and played Services cricket and football. He was signed by Hampshire in 1948, after being spotted by the Hampshire coach, Sam Staples. Originally destined to be a batsman, he was encouraged to return to pace bowling. In his first season, he did little of note, but in 1949, despite unfavourable pitches, Shackleton became the mainstay of Hampshire's attack. He took 100 wickets in 20 consecutive seasons, from 1949 until his retirement at the end of 1968. Only Wilfred Rhodes has taken 100 wickets in more seasons (23) but these were not consecutive. Shackleton almost reached a thousand runs as a batsman in his first season, but his batting subsequently declined until he was firmly entrenched in the lower order by the mid-1950s. He was awarded his county cap in 1949.

Shackleton's talent was soon recognised, and he played his first Test against the West Indies in 1950. With the pitches plumb and batsmen willing to hit him, Shackleton enjoyed little success. Frank Worrell scored a double century, and Everton Weekes a century, in his debut match. He also failed on his only chance of an Ashes tour. After another successful season in 1951, Shackleton was chosen to tour India in 1951/1952, but though accurate he lacked penetration on the slow Indian turf. With Alec Bedser, and later Fred Trueman, Brian Statham and Frank Tyson providing England's with penetrating pace bowling, Shackleton had no opportunities in Test cricket for over a decade.

His county record continued to improve: he took 150 wickets for 20.46 each in 1953, and bettered that in 1955 with 159 and 1958 with 165. In 1955, Shackleton had the outstanding match analysis of 14 for 29 against Somerset at Weston-super-Mare, taking 8–4 in the first innings, and 6–25 in the second. In taking eight wickets for four runs, Shackleton posted the most remarkable bowling figures in county cricket in the 20th century. He was a Wisden Cricketer of the Year in 1959, and recorded his best innings figures, 9 for 30, against Warwickshire at Portsmouth in 1960. His captain, Colin Ingleby-Mackenzie, called on him to bowl with Warwickshire on 196–4, playing for a draw with 45 minutes left to play. As ordered by his captain, he conceded a four to secure the new ball, and then took 6 wickets in 26 deliveries without the batsmen taking another run. He took nine wickets in an innings on three further occasions, and also took five wickets in nine balls against Leicestershire in 1950, but never managed to take a hat-trick. Throughout the 1950s, Shackleton formed a success bowling partnership at Hampshire with fellow seam bowler Victor Cannings.

Shackleton's high work rate reached new levels in the following years: he bowled over 9,000 balls in the dry summer of 1961, spearheading Hampshire's drive to their first County Championship win. In 1962 Shackleton became the last bowler to bowl 10,000 balls in a season (and only the third who was not a spinner, after J.T. Hearne and Maurice Tate), taking 172 wickets.

His continuing form in 1963 saw Shackleton recalled – surprisingly – to the Test arena for the second Test against the West Indies at Lord's, alongside Trueman. He took three wickets in four balls in his recall match, ending with match figures of 7–165. He was ninth out in England's second innings, chasing six runs to win with two balls left to play. Colin Cowdrey came out to bat with a broken arm, and David Allen defended the last two balls of the match to secure a draw. Shackleton also supported an irresistible Trueman well with the ball in the third Test, but was relatively ineffective in the last two games, and never played for England again.

He was the leading first-class wicket-taker every year from 1962 to 1965, and although limited-overs cricket showed his bowling could be hit, Shackleton remained very economical up until his retirement from first-class cricket at the end of 1968 – still among the top ten wicket-takers in the country. He played a few limited-overs games in 1969 and 1970, and played for Dorset for a number of years after this, showing he still retained his skill in the 1973 Gillette Cup. He has the seventh-highest tally of first-class wickets, behind Rhodes, Tich Freeman, Charlie Parker, Jack Hearne, Tom Goddard and Alec Kennedy. Shackleton has the most first-class wickets of any player who played his whole career after the World War II. He was also economical, with 35% of his overs being maidens, and conceding an average of only two runs per over.

== Bowling style ==
He bowled mostly in-swingers, with the occasional out-swinger, both moving late, with a classical high and smooth sideways-on action. He could also move the ball off the seam, with a leg cutter, a yorker, and off-spinning slower ball. All were metronomically accurate – if the batsman missed, Shackleton would hit the stumps. Indeed, nearly half of his wickets were bowled or LBW. And he could bowl all day, off a 12-pace run.

He was described by John Arlott as "shrewd, varied, and utterly accurate, beating down as unremittingly as February rain", and "the modern master of bowling in English conditions".

== Personal life ==
Shackleton married his wife, Kathy, in 1951. She also hailed from his home town, Todmorden. They had a son, Julian Shackleton, who played cricket for Gloucestershire, and a daughter.

After retiring from first-class cricket, Shackleton lived at Ferndown and was coach and groundsman at Canford School in Dorset. He also umpired several first-class matches from 1979 to 1982. He finally retired in 1990. He became an honorary member of the Marylebone Cricket Club (MCC) in 1994.

He died in Canford Magna, Dorset in September 2007 at the age of 83, survived by his two children, his wife having predeceased him.
