= Steve Forshaw =

English cricketer

Steven Forshaw
Personal information
- Full name: Steven Mark Forshaw
- Born: 19 June 1974 (age 52); Templecombe, Somerset, England
- Batting: Right-handed
- Bowling: Right-arm medium

Domestic team information
- Years: Team
- 1998–2002: Dorset

Career statistics
Competition	List A
Matches	5
Runs scored	12
Batting average	4.00
100s/50s	0/0
Top score	7*
Balls bowled	234
Wickets	7
Bowling average	30.85
5 wickets in innings	0
10 wickets in match	0
Best bowling	2/22
Catches/stumpings	1/–
- Source: Cricinfo, 16 March 2010

Steven Mark Forshaw (born 19 June 1974) is a former English cricketer. Forshaw was a right-handed batsman who bowled right-arm medium pace.

In 1998 Forshaw also made his Minor Counties Championship debut for Dorset against Herefordshire. From 1998 to 2000 Forshaw represented Dorset in 18 Minor Counties matches, with his final match for Dorset coming against Cumberland in the final of the 2000 Minor Counties Championship, which Dorset won by 5 wickets.

In 1998 Forshaw also made his List A debut for Dorset in the 1998 NatWest Trophy first round against Hampshire County Cricket Club. Forshaw played a further four List A matches for Dorset from 1998 to 2002, with his final List A match for Dorset coming against the Worcestershire Cricket Board in the 2003 Cheltenham & Gloucester Trophy which was played in 2002. In his five List A matches for Dorset he took seven wickets at a bowling average of 30.85, with best figures of 2/22.
