= David Kidner =

English cricketer

Personal information
- Full name: David Aaron Kidner
- Born: 13 March 1982 (age 44); Bristol, Avon, England
- Batting: Right-handed
- Bowling: Left-arm fast

Domestic team information
- Years: Team
- 2000–2004 & 2009–present: Dorset

Career statistics
Competition	LA
Matches	3
Runs scored	28
Batting average	28.00
100s/50s	–/–
Top score	23*
Balls bowled	78
Wickets	1
Bowling average	65.00
5 wickets in innings	–
10 wickets in match	–
Best bowling	1/21
Catches/stumpings	–/–
- Source: Cricinfo, 21 March 2010

David Aaron Kidner (born 13 March 1982) is an English cricketer. Kidner is a right-handed batsman who bowled left-arm fast.

In 2000, Kidner made his debut for Dorset in a List-A match in the 2000 NatWest Trophy against Norfolk. Kidner played a further 2 List-A matches for the county against Scotland in the 2nd round of the 2002 Cheltenham & Gloucester Trophy which was played in 2001 and against Yorkshire in 2nd round of the 2004 Cheltenham & Gloucester Trophy.

Also in 2000, Kidner made his debut for county in the 2000 Minor Counties Championship against Herefordshire. From 2000 to 2004, Kidner represented Dorset in 14 Minor Counties Championship matches, with his final Minor Counties appearance for the county coming against Berkshire. In 2009, Kidner returned to the county for a second spell, playing 2 Minor Counties matches against Berkshire and Wiltshire.
