= Kristian Wilson (cricketer) =

English cricketer

Personal information
- Full name: Kristian John Wilson
- Born: 11 September 1982 (age 44); Poole, Dorset, England
- Batting: Right-handed
- Bowling: Right-arm medium-fast

Domestic team information
- Years: Team
- 2001–2004: Dorset

Career statistics
Competition	LA
Matches	2
Runs scored	0
Batting average	0.00
100s/50s	–/–
Top score	0
Balls bowled	66
Wickets	1
Bowling average	55.00
5 wickets in innings	–
10 wickets in match	–
Best bowling	1/41
Catches/stumpings	–/–
- Source: Cricinfo, 20 March 2010

Kristian John Wilson (born 11 September 1982) is a former English cricketer. Wilson was a right-handed batsman who bowled right-arm medium-fast.

In 2001, Wilson made his debut and his List-A debut for Dorset against Bedfordshire in the 2nd round of the 2001 Cheltenham & Gloucester Trophy. Wilson played a further List-A match for the county against Scotland in the 2nd round of the 2002 Cheltenham & Gloucester Trophy which was played in 2001.

In the same season that he made his List-A debut, he also made his debut for the county in the 2001 Minor Counties Championship against Herefordshire. From 2001 to 2004, Wilson played infrequent Minor County matches for Dorset, eventually representing Dorset in 5 Minor Counties Championship matches, with his final match for the county coming against Cheshire.
