= Simon Turrill =

English cricketer and teacher

Simon John Turrill (born 25 May 1962) is a former English cricketer, and now a teacher. He was a right-handed batsman and a slow right-arm bowler who played for Dorset.

Turrill was born in Nottinghamshire, and attended Nottingham High School, where he captained the cricket team in 1980. He went on to study at Birmingham University and Loughborough University, representing England Universities in 1982 and 1983 before he became a schoolteacher. He teaches chemistry at Bryanston School in Dorset, where he is also master-in-charge of cricket.

Turrill represented Nottinghamshire's Second XI in one match in the 1982 Second XI Championship, and made his Dorset debut in the Minor Counties Knock Out Competition of 1986. His NatWest Trophy debut followed later in the same month, and he became a regular for the team in the 1986 Minor Counties Championship. His second and final List A match came during the 1987 NatWest Trophy, in a game which once again finished in a heavy first-round defeat for Dorset.
