= Richard Pyman =

Personal information
- Full name: Richard Anthony Pyman
- Born: 17 April 1968 (age 58); Changi, Singapore
- Batting: Right-handed
- Bowling: Right-arm medium

Domestic team information
- Years: Team
- 1990–1999: Dorset
- 1988–1991: Cambridge University

Career statistics
Competition	FC	LA
Matches	23	5
Runs scored	340	24
Batting average	13.60	6.00
100s/50s	–/2	–/–
Top score	69	23
Balls bowled	3,439	258
Wickets	32	2
Bowling average	54.78	112.50
5 wickets in innings	1	–
10 wickets in match	–	–
Best bowling	5/43	1/47
Catches/stumpings	7/–	–/–
- Source: Cricinfo, 5 April 2010

Richard Anthony Pyman (born 17 April 1968) is a Singaporean born former English cricketer. Pyman was a right-handed batsman who bowled right-arm medium pace.

Pyman was educated at Ludgrove School and Harrow School, where he captained the school cricket team in 1986.

Pyman made his first-class debut for Cambridge University against Essex in 1988. Pyman played 23 first-class matches for the university from 1988 to 1991, with his final first-class match coming against Leicestershire. In his 23 first-class matches he scored 340 runs at a batting average of 13.60, with two half centuries and a high score of 69 against Nottinghamshire in 1989. With the ball he took 32 wickets at a bowling average of 54.78, with best a single five wicket haul of 5/43 against Oxford University in 1989.

In 1990, Pyman made his Dorset debut in the 1990 Minor Counties Championship against Devon. Pyman played 54 Minor Counties matches for Dorset, with his final Minor Counties match for the county coming against Cheshire in the 1999 Minor Counties Championship.

In 1991, he made his List-A debut for Dorset against Lancashire in the 1st round of the 1991 NatWest Trophy. Pyman made 5 List-A appearances for Dorset, with his final List-A match for the county coming against Scotland in the 2nd round of the 1999 NatWest trophy. In his 5 List-A matches for Dorset, he took just 2 wickets at an average of 112.50.
