= James Graham-Brown =

English cricketer, schoolteacher and playwright

Personal information
- Full name: James Martin Hilary Graham-Brown
- Born: 11 July 1951 (age 75); Thetford, Norfolk
- Batting: Right-handed
- Bowling: Right-arm medium-pace
- Relatives: Lionel Blaxland (great-uncle); Annie Hemingway (daughter)

Domestic team information
- Years: Team
- 1974–1976: Kent
- 1977–1978: Derbyshire
- 1981–1984: Cornwall
- 1989–1991: Dorset

Career statistics
| Competition | First-class | List A |
|---|---|---|
| Matches | 30 | 27 |
| Runs scored | 368 | 227 |
| Batting average | 12.26 | 13.35 |
| 100s/50s | 0/0 | 0/1 |
| Top score | 43 | 58 |
| Balls bowled | 1,340 | 486 |
| Wickets | 12 | 11 |
| Bowling average | 58.00 | 34.00 |
| 5 wickets in innings | 0 | 0 |
| 10 wickets in match | 0 | 0 |
| Best bowling | 2/23 | 3/4 |
| Catches/stumpings | 8/– | 6/– |
- Source: Cricinfo, 15 November 2016

James Martin Hilary Graham-Brown (born 11 July 1951) is a former English professional cricketer and schoolteacher. He is now a playwright who writes under the pen name Dougie Blaxland.

== Early life and education ==
Graham-Brown was born at Thetford in Norfolk, the son of Lewis Graham-Brown and his wife Elizabeth Blaxland. He attended Sevenoaks School in Kent, playing in the First XI for several years and as captain in 1970, when he scored 403 runs at an average of 40.30 and took 45 wickets at 8.60. He read English literature at the University of Kent, obtaining a first-class honours degree, and then went on to Bristol University to complete a master's degree in philosophy.

== Cricket career ==
Graham-Brown was a right-handed batsman and a right-arm medium-pace bowler who played for Kent, Derbyshire, Cornwall and Dorset between 1974 and 1991.

After playing for Young England teams in 1969 and 1970, Graham-Brown made his debut for Kent's Second XI in 1971. He was retained as a young professional by Kent, although encouraged by the club's secretary and manager Les Ames to attend university at the same time. He made his senior debut for Kent in the 1974 John Player League before going on to make his first-class cricket debut against Middlesex at Canterbury in August 1974 and playing in the county's winning team in the 1974 Gillette Cup final. He spent six years with Kent, a time he has described as being "largely on the fringes" of the team, before moving to Derbyshire ahead of the 1977 season. After two seasons that he has described as "disappointing" with Derbyshire he retired from professional cricket, playing Minor Counties cricket for Cornwall until 1984 and for Dorset between 1989 and 1991.

Graham-Brown's great-uncle, Lionel Blaxland, played first-class cricket for Derbyshire, primarily between 1932 and 1935.

== Later career ==
Graham-Brown became a schoolteacher. He was Headteacher of Truro High School for eight years before taking up the position of Headmaster of the independent girls' school, the Royal High School, Bath, on Lansdown in Bath. In December 2009, after 11 years in the position, he retired.

Graham-Brown writes plays under the pen name of Dougie Blaxland. His one-man play When the Eye Has Gone, about the life and death of the Test cricketer Colin Milburn, was performed around England in late 2016, including performances at all 18 County Championship cricket grounds. In 2019 The Long Walk Back, his play about the former Test cricketer Chris Lewis, was first produced at HMP Portland, Dorset. Later in 2019 his play Getting the Third Degree, about the international player Laurie Cunningham and racism in English football, toured extensively in England and Wales. Unknown, based on the experiences of seven homeless people, and funded by the Arts Council, the Big Lottery and The Big Issue, was first performed as an audio play in October 2020.

In 2021, under his own name, Graham-Brown co-wrote the book Not Out at Close of Play with the book's subject, the English Test cricketer Dennis Amiss.

== Plays ==
Dougie Blaxland's plays, with date of first performance:

- Leaving Samson (1997)
- Marital Moments (2002)
- Moving In and Taking Over (2004)
- Going Down (2005)
- Crisis (2006)
- A Degree of Compulsion (2006)
- Hatching Vain Empires (2006)
- Hitching Rides Home (2006)
- A Hostage Close to Home (2006)
- A Public Kind of Privacy (2006)
- Redeeming Lizzie Reeve (2006)
- Speaking Ill of the Dead (2006)
- Chauntecleer and Pertelotte (2007)
- Getting Scrap Value (2007)
- The Wild Woods (2008)
- That Moment (2008)
- You'll Never Guess What? (2008)
- If I Were a Carpenter (2010)
- Never Any Fruit (2010)
- Biggles Flies a Fokker Home (2011)
- Machamlear (2011)
- The Tamworth Two (2011)
- Bursary Boy (2012)
- A Christmas Carol: The Musical (2012)
- Jane Eyre: An Autobiography (2013)
- The King of the Choughs (2014)
- Wuthering Heights (2014)
- Hands Up for Jonny Wilkinson's Right Boot (2015)
- When the Eye Has Gone (2016)
- The Long Walk Back (2019)
- Getting the Third Degree (2019)
- Unknown (2020)
- On the Ropes (2023; written with Vernon Vanriel)
- Our Little Hour (2024; musical, with composer Chris Anthony, about Walter Tull)

== Personal life ==
Graham-Brown lost the sight of one eye in 2013. His daughter, Annie Hemingway, is an actress.
