= Andrew Hodgson (cricketer) =

New Zealand-born South African cricketer

Personal information
- Full name: Andrew Sabin Hodgson
- Born: 16 September 1941 (age 85); Auckland, Auckland Region, New Zealand
- Batting: Right-handed
- Bowling: Right-arm medium

Domestic team information
- Years: Team
- 1967/68: Western Province
- 1972–1980: Dorset

Career statistics
Competition	First-class	List A
Matches	6	1
Runs scored	17	2
Batting average	8.50	2.00
100s/50s	0/0	0/0
Top score	11*	2
Balls bowled	950	72
Wickets	10	1
Bowling average	32.90	37.00
5 wickets in innings	0	0
10 wickets in match	0	0
Best bowling	4/50	1/37
Catches/stumpings	2/–	0/–
- Source: Cricinfo, 15 March 2010

Andrew Sabin Hodgson (born 16 September 1941) is a former New Zealand born South African cricketer. Hodgson was a right-handed batsman who bowled right-arm medium pace.

Hodgson made his first-class debut for Western Province in 1967 against South African Universities. From 1967 to 1968 he played 6 first-class matches for Western Province, with his final first-class match coming against Natal B. In his 6 matches for the Province he took 10 wickets at a bowling average of 32.90, with best figures of 4/50.

In 1973 Hodgson made his debut for Dorset in the 1973 Minor Counties Championship against Cornwall. During the same season Hodgson made his List-A debut for Dorset against Staffordshire in the Gillette Cup, where he took a single wicket in the match. This was Hodgson's only List-A appearance. Hodgson played infrequently for Dorset in the Minor Counties Championship, playing 11 matches for Dorset from 1973 to 1980, with his final match for the county coming against Devon.
