= Lloyd Ferreira =

South African cricketer

Personal information
- Full name: Lloyd Douglas Ferreira
- Born: 6 May 1974 (age 52); Johannesburg, Transvaal Province, South Africa
- Batting: Right-handed
- Bowling: Left-arm medium

Domestic team information
- Years: Team
- 1998: Dorset
- 1997/98–1998/99: Western Province B
- 1997/98–2003/04: Western Province
- 1993/94–1996/97: Boland

Career statistics
Competition	FC	LA
Matches	67	81
Runs scored	3,088	2,147
Batting average	28.24	29.27
100s/50s	7/12	3/13
Top score	201	134
Balls bowled	126	24
Wickets	1	1
Bowling average	80.00	8.00
5 wickets in innings	–	–
10 wickets in match	–	–
Best bowling	1/25	1/8
Catches/stumpings	35/–	23/–
- Source: Cricinfo, 31 May 2010

Lloyd Douglas Ferreira (born 6 May 1974) is a former South African cricketer. Ferreira was a right-handed batsman and a left-arm medium pace bowler.

Ferreira made his first-class debut for Boland in the 1993–94 season against the touring Australians. Ferreira would go on to represent the team 25 times in first-class matches from 1993–94 to 1996–97, where he would score 958 runs at a batting average of 19.55, with 26 half centuries and a single century high score of 127.

Ferreira made his List-A debut for Boland against Orange Free State in the 1994–95 Benson and Hedges Series. During his time with Boland, he represented the team in 35 List-A matches from 1994–95 to 1996–97, where he scored 1,141 runs at an average of 33.55. He made 2 centuries and 7 half centuries and made a high score of 125*.

With the departure of West Indian Desmond Haynes, the call-up of Gary Kirsten to the South African team and the inevitable call-up of Herschelle Gibbs, Western Province were in need of a new opening batsman. Ferreira was signed by the province for the 1997–98 season, where he made his first-class debut for the province against Free State. During his time with Western Province, Ferreira played 4 first-class matches for the Western Province B team. For the main team, he played 38 matches during which he scored 1,930 runs at an average of 32.16, with 5 centuries and 8 half centuries. He also made his highest first-class score for the province, 201 against North West in 2001. He played his final first-class match for the province against KwaZulu-Natal in the 2003–04 SuperSport Series.

Ferreira also played List-A cricket for Western Province, making his one-day debut against Griqualand West in the 1997–98 Standard Bank League. He played 45 one-day matches for the province, scoring 999 runs at an average of 24.97, with a 6 half centuries and a single century score of 134. His final one-day match for the province came against Easterns in the 2003–04 Standard Bank Cup.

In 1998 he represented Dorset in England, in the 1998 NatWest Trophy against Hampshire. Ferreira scored 7 runs, before being dismissed by Nixon McLean in what his only appearance for the English county. In 1999, he played 4 matches for Rawtenstall Cricket Club in the Lancashire League.
