= Dorset County Cricket Club =

English Cricket Club

Personnel
- Captain: (England) Luke Webb
- Coach: (England) Paul Lawrence

Team information
- Founded: 1896
- Home ground: Various

History
- FP Trophy wins: 0
- Official website: Dorset Cricket home

Dorset County Cricket Club is one of twenty National county clubs within the domestic cricket structure of England and Wales. It represents the historic county of Dorset.

The team is currently a member of the National Counties Cricket Association Championship Western Division 2 and plays in the National Counties Cricket Association Knockout Trophy and the NCCA T20 Competition. Dorset played List A matches occasionally from 1968 until 2004 but is not classified as a List A team per se.

The club is currently without a permanent ground so it uses several club grounds inside the historic county boundaries, where they play their home matches.

In 2023, the County Cricket Club became part of Cricket Dorset Ltd and amalgamated with the Dorset Cricket Board and other Dorset cricket entities.

== Honours ==
- Minor Counties Championship (2) - 2000, 2010
- MCCA Knockout Trophy (2) - 1988, 2025
- Gillette/NatWest/C&G (0) -

== Earliest cricket ==
An advertisement in the Sherborne Mercury dated Tuesday 9 May 1738 is the earliest reference for cricket in Dorset. Twelve Dorchester men at Ridgway Races challenged twelve men from elsewhere to play them at cricket for the prize of twelve pairs of gloves valued at a shilling a pair.

== Origin of club ==
According to Wisden there was county organisation in existence in either 1862 or 1871. The present Dorset CCC was founded on 5 February 1896 and first entered the Minor Counties Championship in 1902.

== Club history ==
Dorset has won the Minor Counties Championship twice, in 2000 and 2010.

Dorset has won the MCCA Knockout Trophy twice since its inception in 1983. It won in 1988 and 2025.

== Notable players ==
See List of Dorset CCC players and Category:Dorset cricketers

The following Dorset cricketers have also had notable careers at first-class level:

- Jimmy Adams
- William Andrew
- Peter Badham
- John Baker
- Tom Barber
- Patrick Barrow
- Leslie Bean
- Rayner Blitz
- Bertie Bolton
- Thomas Bowley
- Derek Bridge
- Charles Brutton
- Paul Carey
- Box Case
- Edgar Chester-Master
- John Claughton
- Alan Coleman
- Robert Coombs
- Geoff Courtenay
- Nigel Cowley
- Len Creese
- Bradley Currie
- Scott Currie
- Ray Dovey
- Joseph Eckland
- Charles Fawcus
- Rob Ferley
- Lloyd Ferreira
- Douglas Freeman
- Edward Freeman
- Paul Garlick
- Archie Gibson
- Harold Gimblett
- John Gordon
- James Graham-Brown
- Hubert Greenhill
- Jon Hardy
- Percy Hardy
- Ælfric Harrison
- Geoffrey Hebden
- Bob Herman
- Andrew Hodgson
- Philip Hope
- William Hounsell
- Wilf Hughes
- Eddie Jack
- William Jephson
- Gilbert Jessop
- Charles Johnston
- Chris Jones
- Steffan Jones
- Matthew Keech
- Andrew Kennedy
- Walter Lancashire
- Jack Leach
- Richard Lewis
- Jacob Lintott
- Steve Malone
- Robert Manser
- Dimitri Mascarenhas
- Walter McBride
- Cuan McCarthy
- Lewis McManus
- Richard Merriman
- Jigar Naik
- Geoffrey Ogilvy
- Felix Organ
- Owen Parkin
- David Payne
- Vyvian Pike
- Tom Prest
- Colin Roper
- Lee Savident
- Richard Scott
- Steven Selwood
- Andrew Sexton
- Derek Shackleton
- Julian Shackleton
- Roger Sillence
- Harold Stephenson
- Reginald Swalwell
- David Taylor
- Malcolm Taylor
- Max Waller
- John Watson
- Rev Bourne Webb
- Tom Webley
- Alan Willows
- George Woodhouse
- Larry Worrell

== Grounds ==
The club currently plays its home matches at several venues during the season which include:

- Wimborne CC
- Dorchester CC

It formerly played at Dean Park Cricket Ground in Bournemouth, which is historically part of neighbouring Hampshire and was once used as a home venue by Hampshire County Cricket Club and Sherborne School Cricket Ground in Sherborne.
