= List of Minor Counties North List A players =

Minor Counties North played in List A cricket matches between 1972 and 1979. This is a list of the players who appeared in those matches.

- Steve Atkinson (1974): SR Atkinson
- David Bailey (1973–1979): D Bailey
- Terry Barnes (1974): TH Barnes
- Douglas Beckett (1979): DK Beckett
- Peter Bradley (1973–1975): P Bradley
- Alan Brown (1974): A Brown
- Alan Burridge (1972–1974): AJ Burridge
- Richard Burton (1974): RL Burton
- Bob Cooke (1972–1979): RMO Cooke
- Mike Crawhall (1972): JM Crawhall
- John Dale (1974): JR Dale
- Richard Downend (1972–1975): RH Downend
- Ian Gemmell (1979): IJ Gemmell
- Peter Gibbs (1973): PJK Gibbs
- Antony Good (1979): AJ Good
- Stephen Greensword (1973): S Greensword
- David Halfyard (1972–1973): DJ Halfyard
- David Hancock (1972–1975): DA Hancock
- Quorn Handley (1979): FLQ Handley
- Gerry Hardstaff (1972): GC Hardstaff
- John Harvey (1975): JF Harvey
- Michael Hodson (1979): MD Hodson
- Richard Jefferson (1972): RI Jefferson
- Steve Johnson (1979): JS Johnson
- Brian Lander (1973–1974): BR Lander
- Martin Maslin (1972–1975): M Maslin
- Colin McManus (1975): CA McManus
- Richard Mercer (1979): RAD Mercer
- Frederick Millett (1972–1973): FW Millett
- Steve Milner (1975): SA Milner
- Ian Moore (1973–1974): HI Moore
- John Moore (1975): JD Moore
- Tracey Moore (1972–1973): TI Moore
- Neil O'Brien (1979): NT O'Brien
- Alan Old (1973–1975): AGB Old
- Roger Pearman (1974–1975): R Pearman
- Thomas Pearsall (1979): TA Pearsall
- Kenneth Pearson (1979): K Pearson
- Brian Perry (1975): BJ Perry
- David Pilch (1974–1975): DG Pilch
- Geoffrey Plaskitt (1972): G Plaskitt
- Neil Riddell (1979): NA Riddell
- Geoff Robinson (1972–1979): G Robinson
- Keith Rudd (1973): RK Rudd
- Tony Shippey (1972): PA Shippey
- Doug Slade (1974): DNF Slade
- Keith Stride (1975): KH Stride
- Arthur Sutton (1975): JA Sutton
- Peter Swart (1975): PD Swart
- Stuart Wilkinson (1979): JS Wilkinson
- Derek Wing (1972–1975): DC Wing
- Ian Wishart (1979): IA Wishart
- Stuart Wood (1975): SL Wood
- John Woodford (1975): JD Woodford
