= List of Lincolnshire County Cricket Club List A players =

Lincolnshire County Cricket Club played in List A cricket matches between 1966 and 2004. This is a list of the players who appeared in those matches.

- Kristian Adams (2002): K Adams
- Steve Adlard (1976): SK Adlard
- James Airey (1990): JR Airey
- Stuart Airey (2003): SJ Airey
- Nicholas Armstrong (1996–2000): NJ Armstrong
- Terry Barnes (1971–1976): TH Barnes
- Richard Bates (1990): RT Bates
- Ronald Beeson (1966–1967): RN Beeson
- Trevor Blades (1974): TG Blades
- Stephen Bradford (1996–1999): SA Bradford
- Kevin Brooks (1983): KG Brooks
- Oliver Burford (2001–2004): OE Burford
- Richard Burton (1983–1988): RL Burton
- Paul Butler (1983–1988): PR Butler
- George Camplin (1966–1967): GB Camplin
- Graeme Carsberg (1988): GJ Carsberg
- Bobby Chapman (2000–2003): RJ Chapman
- David Christmas (1991–2004): DA Christmas
- James Clarke (1999–2003): J Clarke
- Geoff Cope (1983): GA Cope
- John Dale (1974–1976): JR Dale
- Jonathan Davies (2002–2004): JR Davies
- Shane Deitz (2002–2004): SA Deitz
- Nigel Dobbs (1988–1994): NP Dobbs
- Martyn Dobson (2002–2004): MC Dobson
- Mathew Dowman (2003–2004): MP Dowman
- Roddy Estwick (1983): RO Estwick
- Brian Evans (1966–1971): JB Evans
- Russell Evans (1994–1997): RJ Evans
- Duncan Fearnley (1971): CD Fearnley
- Mark Fell (1988–2003): MA Fell
- Stuart Fletcher (1994): SD Fletcher
- Guy Franks (1983–1988): JG Franks
- Neil French (1988–1994): N French
- Nick Gandon (1990–1991): NJC Gandon
- Neil Gill (1996): NS Gill
- David Gillett (1996–2000): DE Gillett
- Mark Gouldstone (1996–1997): MR Gouldstone
- Peter Hacker (1983–1994): PJ Hacker
- Jason Harrison (1999–2002): JC Harrison
- Phillip Heseltine (1991): PJ Heseltine
- Mark Higgs (2003): MA Higgs
- Michael Hodson (1976): MD Hodson
- Richard Howitt (1999–2002): RWJ Howitt
- Austin Jelfs (1991): AC Jelfs
- David Johnson (1966–1967): D Johnson
- Terry Johnson (1971–1976): T Johnson
- Simon Kelk (1988): SD Kelk
- Johnny Lawrence (1966): J Lawrence
- Jim Love (1990–1991): JD Love
- Ivan Madray (1966–1967): IS Madray
- David Marshall (1983–1991): D Marshall
- Martin Maslin (1966–1976): M Maslin
- Paul McKeown (1990–1991): PD McKeown
- Norman McVicker (1966–1967): NM McVicker
- Kyle Mills (2001): KD Mills
- Ian Moore (1971–1976): HI Moore
- Simon Oakes (1996–2003): S Oakes
- Andrew Parkin-Coates (2004): AW Parkin-Coates
- Lee Peacock (1999): LR Peacock
- David Pipes (2000–2002): DJ Pipes
- Geoffrey Plaskitt (1967–1974): G Plaskitt
- Stephen Plumb (1997–2000): SG Plumb
- Paul Pollard (2003): PR Pollard
- Ian Pont (1990): IL Pont
- Harry Pougher (1967–1988): H Pougher
- Joe Price (1971): HJ Price
- Neil Priestley (1983–1990): N Priestley
- Sonny Ramadhin (1971): S Ramadhin
- Paul Rawden (1994–1997): PA Rawden
- Adrian Richardson (1966–1974): CA Richardson
- Geoff Robinson (1966–1983): G Robinson
- David Storer (1990–1994): DB Storer
- John Sunley (1966–1976): J Sunley
- David Towse (1996): AD Towse
- Peter Trend (1997–2000): PC Trend
- Jonathan Trower (2000–2004): J Trower
- Shaun Trower (2001): SD Trower
- Stephen Warman (1990–2001): SN Warman
- Simon Webb (2002): S Webb
- Lesroy Weekes (1997): LC Weekes
- Guy Welton (2004): GE Welton
- Clive Wicks (1988): C Wicks
- Jonathan Wileman (1994–1997): JR Wileman
- Paul Willis (1974–1976): WP Willis
- Elliot Wilson (2003–2004): EJ Wilson
- Graham Wilson (1996): GB Wilson
- Mervyn Winfield (1971): HM Winfield
- Ashley Wright (2004): AS Wright
