= Lists of English cricketers =

Lists of English cricketers include:

== National men ==
- List of England Test cricketers
- List of England ODI cricketers
- List of England Twenty20 International cricketers

== National women ==
- List of England women Test cricketers
- List of England women ODI cricketers
- List of England women Twenty20 International cricketers

== Current first-class counties ==
- List of Derbyshire County Cricket Club players
- List of Durham County Cricket Club players
- List of Essex County Cricket Club players
- List of Glamorgan County Cricket Club players
- List of Gloucestershire County Cricket Club players
- List of Hampshire County Cricket Club players
- List of Kent County Cricket Club players
- List of Lancashire County Cricket Club players
- List of Leicestershire County Cricket Club players
- List of Middlesex County Cricket Club players
- List of Northamptonshire County Cricket Club players
- List of Nottinghamshire County Cricket Club players
- List of Somerset County Cricket Club players
- List of Surrey County Cricket Club players
- List of Sussex County Cricket Club players
- List of Warwickshire County Cricket Club players
- List of Worcestershire County Cricket Club players
- List of Yorkshire County Cricket Club players

== The Hundred teams ==
- List of Birmingham Phoenix cricketers
- List of London Spirit cricketers
- List of Manchester Originals cricketers
- List of Northern Superchargers cricketers
- List of Oval Invincibles cricketers
- List of Southern Brave cricketers
- List of Trent Rockets cricketers
- List of Welsh Fire cricketers

== Marylebone Cricket Club ==
- List of Marylebone Cricket Club players (1787–1826)
- List of Marylebone Cricket Club players (1827–1863)
- List of Marylebone Cricket Club players (1864–1894)
- List of Marylebone Cricket Club players (1895–1914)
- List of Marylebone Cricket Club players (1919–1939)
- List of Marylebone Cricket Club players (1946–1977)
- List of Marylebone Cricket Club players (1978–)

== Gentlemen v Players ==
- List of Gentlemen cricketers (1806–1840)
- List of Gentlemen cricketers (1841–1962)
- List of Players cricketers (1806–1840)
- List of Players cricketers (1841–1962)

== Former first-class universities ==
- List of British Universities cricketers
- List of Cambridge UCCE & MCCU players
- List of Cambridge University Cricket Club players
- List of Cardiff MCCU players
- List of Combined Universities cricket team players
- List of Durham UCCE & MCCU players
- List of Leeds/Bradford MCCU players
- List of Loughborough MCCU players
- List of Oxford UCCE & MCCU players
- List of Oxford University Cricket Club players
- List of Oxford and Cambridge Universities cricket team players

== Former first-class teams ==
- List of Berkshire and Oldfield first-class cricketers to 1795
- List of Cambridge Town Club and Cambridgeshire cricketers
- List of Combined Services (United Kingdom) cricketers
- List of Essex first-class cricketers to 1793
- List of Gentlemen of Kent cricketers
- List of I Zingari first-class cricketers
- List of Kent county cricketers to 1842
- List of London County Cricket Club players
- List of Manchester Cricket Club players
- List of Nottingham Cricket Club players
- List of Royal Air Force first-class cricketers
- List of Royal Navy first-class cricketers
- List of Sheffield Cricket Club players
- List of Suffolk first-class cricketers

== Minor counties ==
- List of Bedfordshire County Cricket Club List A players
- List of Berkshire County Cricket Club List A players
- List of Buckinghamshire County Cricket Club List A players
- List of Cambridgeshire County Cricket Club List A players
- List of Cheshire County Cricket Club List A players
- List of Cornwall County Cricket Club List A players
- List of Cumberland County Cricket Club List A players
- List of Devon County Cricket Club List A players
- List of Dorset County Cricket Club List A players
- List of Herefordshire County Cricket Club List A players
- List of Hertfordshire County Cricket Club List A players
- List of Huntingdonshire County Cricket Club List A players
- List of Lincolnshire County Cricket Club List A players
- List of Minor Counties cricketers
- List of Minor Counties East List A players
- List of Minor Counties North List A players
- List of Minor Counties South List A players
- List of Minor Counties West List A players
- List of Norfolk County Cricket Club List A players
- List of Northumberland County Cricket Club List A players
- List of Oxfordshire County Cricket Club List A players
- List of Staffordshire County Cricket Club List A players
- List of Suffolk County Cricket Club List A players
- List of Unicorns List A players
- List of Wales Minor Counties Cricket Club List A players
- List of Wiltshire County Cricket Club List A players

== County cricket boards ==
- List of Derbyshire Cricket Board List A players
- List of Durham Cricket Board List A players
- List of Essex Cricket Board List A players
- List of Gloucestershire Cricket Board List A players
- List of Hampshire Cricket Board List A players
- List of Kent Cricket Board List A players
- List of Lancashire Cricket Board List A players
- List of Leicestershire Cricket Board List A players
- List of Middlesex Cricket Board List A players
- List of Northamptonshire Cricket Board List A players
- List of Nottinghamshire Cricket Board List A players
- List of Somerset Cricket Board List A players
- List of Surrey Cricket Board List A players
- List of Sussex Cricket Board List A players
- List of Warwickshire Cricket Board List A players
- List of Worcestershire Cricket Board List A players
- List of Yorkshire Cricket Board List A players

== Former women's regional teams ==
- List of Central Sparks cricketers
- List of Lancashire Thunder cricketers
- List of Loughborough Lightning cricketers
- List of Northern Diamonds cricketers
- List of North West Thunder cricketers
- List of South East Stars cricketers
- List of Southern Vipers cricketers
- List of Sunrisers women's cricketers
- List of Surrey Stars cricketers
- List of The Blaze women's cricketers
- List of Western Storm cricketers
- List of Yorkshire Diamonds cricketers

== Players by era ==
- List of English cricketers (1598–1786)
- List of English cricketers (1787–1825)

== Birthplace ==
- List of English international cricketers born outside of England

== See also ==
- Category:Lists of English cricketers
- Lists of Scottish cricketers
