= List of Minor Counties East List A players =

Minor Counties East played in List A cricket matches between 1976 and 1978. This is a list of the players who appeared in those matches.

- Steve Atkinson (1978): SR Atkinson
- David Bailey (1976–1978): D Bailey
- Malcolm Beaty (1978): M Beaty
- Peter Birtwisle (1977): PC Birtwisle
- Peter Bradley (1976): P Bradley
- Bob Cooke (1978): RMO Cooke
- Peter Gill (1976–1978): PN Gill
- Antony Good (1978): AJ Good
- David Hancock (1977–1978): DA Hancock
- John Harvey (1976): JF Harvey
- Robin Hobbs (1976): RNS Hobbs
- John Howarth (1977): JS Howarth
- Roger Howlett (1978): RF Howlett
- Michael Ikin (1977): MJ Ikin
- Steve Johnson (1978): JS Johnson
- Peter Johnson (1978): PD Johnson
- Peter Kippax (1977): PJ Kippax
- Brian Lander (1976–1978): BR Lander
- Martin Maslin (1976): M Maslin
- John Moore (1977): JD Moore
- Tracey Moore (1976): TI Moore
- Neil O'Brien (1977–1978): NT O'Brien
- Kenneth Pearson (1976–1977): K Pearson
- Neil Riddell (1976–1978): NA Riddell
- Geoff Robinson (1976–1978): G Robinson
- Colin Rutterford (1978): C Rutterford
- Doug Slade (1976): DNF Slade
- John Sunley (1976–1977): J Sunley
- Stuart Wilkinson (1977–1978): JS Wilkinson
- Derek Wing (1976–1977): DC Wing
