= 1971 Gillette Cup =

- Administrator: Test and County Cricket Board
- Cricket format: Limited overs cricket (60 overs per innings)
- Tournament format: Knockout
- Champions: Lancashire (2nd title)
- Participants: 22
- Matches: 21
- Most runs: 332 – Clive Lloyd (Lancashire)
- Most wickets: 11 – John Shepherd (Kent)

The 1971 Gillette Cup was the ninth Gillette Cup, an English limited overs county cricket tournament. It was held between 15 May and 4 September 1971. The tournament was won by Lancashire who defeated Kent by 24 runs in the final at Lord's.

== Format ==
The 17 first-class counties were joined by five Minor Counties: Bedfordshire, Hertfordshire, Lincolnshire, Northumberland and Staffordshire. Teams who won in the first round progressed to the second round. The winners in the second round then progressed to the quarter-final stage. Winners from the quarter-finals then progressed to the semi-finals from which the winners then went on to the final at Lord's which was held on 4 September 1971.

== First round ==
15 May 1971
Scorecard

Essex; 301/9 (60 overs)	v	Bedfordshire; 204/8 (60 overs)
Brian Ward 101; Trevor Morley 3/52 (12 overs)		Bill Bushby 80*; Ray East 2/20 (12 overs)

Essex won by 97 runs
County Ground, Chelmsford
Umpires: Lloyd Budd and Charlie Elliott
Player of the match: Brian Ward (Essex)

15 May 1971
Scorecard

Kent; 223/3 (60 overs)	v	Northamptonshire; 178 (57.3 overs)
Colin Cowdrey 98; Peter Lee 2/37 (12 overs)		David Steele 38; Derek Underwood 3/39 (10.3 overs)

Kent won by 45 runs
St Lawrence Ground, Canterbury
Umpires: Arthur Fagg and John Langridge
Player of the match: Colin Cowdrey (Kent)

15 May 1971
Scorecard

Northumberland; 193/6 (60 overs)	v	Lincolnshire; 195/2 (40.4 overs)
Mike Crawhall 66; Geoffrey Plaskitt 2/26 (12 overs)		Geoff Robinson 132; Ken Norton 1/34 (8.4 overs)

Lincolnshire won by 8 wickets
Osborne Avenue, Jesmond
Umpires: Cec Pepper and Tom Spencer
Player of the match: Geoff Robinson (Lincs)

15, 17 May 1971
Scorecard

Somerset; 206/8 (60 overs)	v	Lancashire; 208/4 (56 overs)
Roy Virgin 105*; Peter Lever 2/19 (12 overs)		David Lloyd 94*; Allan Jones 1/23 (10 overs)

Lancashire won by 6 wickets
County Ground, Taunton
Umpires: Bill Alley and Jack Crapp
Player of the match: David Lloyd (Lancs)

- Match was scheduled for one day but extended to two.

15 May 1971
Scorecard

Glamorgan; 225/5 (60 overs)	v	Staffordshire; 148 (50.4 overs)
Alan Jones 85; Richard Downend 3/35 (12 overs)		Peter Gill 52; Peter Walker 4/34 (8.4 overs)

Glamorgan won by 77 runs
Longton Cricket Club Ground, Stoke-on-Trent
Umpires: Arthur Jepson and Eddie Rowe
Player of the match: Peter Walker (Glam)

15 May 1971
Scorecard

Hertfordshire; 138 (59.5 overs)	v	Surrey; 142/2 (34.4 overs)
Basil Hollington 50; Stewart Storey 2/13 (12 overs)		John Edrich 58*; Brian Collins 1/23 (6 overs)

Surrey won by 8 wickets
The Oval, London
Umpires: John Arnold and Lofty Herman
Player of the match: Basil Hollington (Herts)

== Second round ==
12 June 1971
Scorecard

Essex; 180 (58 overs)	v	Glamorgan; 82 (44.3 overs)
Bruce Francis 72; Lawrence Williams 3/15 (11 overs)		Len Hill 26; Keith Boyce 3/8 (8 overs)

Essex won by 98 runs
Valentine's Park, Ilford
Umpires: George Pope and Dusty Rhodes
Player of the match: Bruce Francis (Essex)

12, 13 June 1971
Scorecard

Nottinghamshire; 129/9 (60 overs)	v	Hampshire; 130/7 (55 overs)
Bob White 38; Butch White 3/32 (12 overs)		Peter Sainsbury 32; Garfield Sobers 4/11 (12 overs)

Hampshire won by 3 wickets
United Services Recreation Ground, Portsmouth
Umpires: Jack Crapp and Eddie Phillipson
Player of the match: Peter Sainsbury (Hants)

- Match was scheduled for one day but extended to two.

12 June 1971
Scorecard

Yorkshire; 148 (59.2 overs)	v	Kent; 149/4 (42.4 overs)
Geoffrey Boycott 46; Bernard Julien 5/25 (12 overs)		Brian Luckhurst 62; Michael Bore 3/35 (10.4 overs)

Kent won by 6 wickets
St Lawrence Ground, Canterbury
Umpires: Bill Alley and Alan Whitehead
Player of the match: Bernard Julien (Kent)

12 June 1971
Scorecard

Derbyshire; 200/9 (60 overs)	v	Leicestershire; 201/9 (58.3 overs)
Chris Wilkins 51; Garth McKenzie 3/30 (12 overs)		Mick Norman 43; Fred Rumsey 3/34 (12 overs)

Leicestershire won by 1 wicket
Grace Road, Leicester
Umpires: Dickie Bird and David Constant
Player of the match: Brian Davison (Leics)

12 June 1971
Scorecard

Surrey; 216 (60 overs)	v	Middlesex; 187 (59.4 overs)
Mike Edwards 64; John Price 6/34 (12 overs)		Michael Smith 57; Stewart Storey 3/24 (12 overs)

Surrey won by 29 runs
The Oval, London
Umpires: Lloyd Budd and David Evans
Player of the match: John Price (Middx)

12 June 1971
Scorecard

Gloucestershire; 252/7 (60 overs)	v	Sussex; 129 (42.3 overs)
Mike Procter 107; John Spencer 2/31 (12 overs)		Tony Greig 33; Mike Procter 3/20 (10 overs)

Gloucestershire won by 123 runs
County Ground, Hove
Umpires: Sam Cook and Charlie Elliott
Player of the match: Mike Procter (Glos)

12 June 1971
Scorecard

Warwickshire; 294/4 (60 overs)	v	Lincolnshire; 136 (47.1 overs)
Rohan Kanhai 126; Geoffrey Plaskitt 3/61 (12 overs)		Duncan Fearnley 45; Norman McVicker 5/26 (12 overs)

Warwickshire won by 158 runs
Edgbaston, Birmingham
Umpires: Cec Pepper and Peter Wight
Player of the match: Rohan Kanhai (Warks)

12 June 1971
Scorecard

Worcestershire; 215/6 (60 overs)	v	Lancashire; 217/4 (54 overs)
Glenn Turner 117*; John Sullivan 1/7 (2 overs)		Clive Lloyd 83*; Bob Carter 1/28 (12 overs)

Lancashire won by 6 wickets
New Road, Worcester
Umpires: John Langridge and Tom Spencer
Player of the match: Clive Lloyd (Lancs)

== Quarter-finals ==
30 June 1971
Scorecard

Lancashire; 203/9 (60 overs)	v	Essex; 191 (59.2 overs)
Clive Lloyd 109; Stuart Turner 3/33 (12 overs)		Stuart Turner 50; Ken Shuttleworth 4/26 (12 overs)

Lancashire won by 12 runs
County Ground, Chelmsford
Umpires: David Constant and Freddie Jakeman
Player of the match: Clive Lloyd (Lancs)

30 June 1971
Scorecard

Gloucestershire; 214 (56.3 overs)	v	Surrey; 199 (56.2 overs)
Ron Nicholls 77; Robin Jackman 3/43 (11 overs)		Micky Stewart 82; Roger Knight 5/39 (10 overs)

Gloucestershire won by 15 runs
Ashley Down Ground, Bristol
Umpires: Alan Whitehead and Peter Wight
Player of the match: Roger Knight (Glos)

30 June 1971
Scorecard

Kent; 231/8 (60 overs)	v	Leicestershire; 153 (47.2 overs)
Mike Denness 85; Ray Illingworth 3/42 (12 overs)		Mick Norman 50; Bob Woolmer 4/37 (12 overs)

Kent won by 78 runs
Grace Road, Leicester
Umpires: Ron Aspinall and Hugo Yarnold
Player of the match: Bob Woolmer (Kent)

30 June 1971
Scorecard

Warwickshire; 281/6 (60 overs)	v	Hampshire; 186 (45.1 overs)
John Jameson 96; Bob Cottam 2/33 (12 overs)		Barry Richards 69; Lance Gibbs 5/38 (11 overs)

Warwickshire won by 95 runs
Edgbaston, Birmingham
Umpires: Dusty Rhodes and Eddie Rowe
Player of the match: John Jameson (Warks)

== Semi-finals ==
28, 29 July 1971
Scorecard

Kent; 238 (59.4 overs)	v	Warwickshire; 109 (43 overs)
Brian Luckhurst 84; Bill Blenkiron 4/51 (12 overs)		John Jameson 48; Bob Woolmer 3/20 (9 overs)

Kent won by 129 runs
St Lawrence Ground, Canterbury
Umpires: John Arnold and Lofty Herman
Player of the match: Brian Luckhurst (Kent)

- Match was scheduled for one day but extended to two.

28 July 1971
Scorecard

Gloucestershire; 229/6 (60 overs)	v	Lancashire; 230/7 (56.5 overs)
Mike Procter 65; Jack Simmons 2/25 (12 overs)		Barry Wood 50; John Mortimore 3/81 (11 overs)

Lancashire won by 3 wickets
Old Trafford, Manchester
Umpires: Dickie Bird and Arthur Jepson
Player of the match: David Hughes (Lancs)

== Final ==
4 September 1971
Scorecard

Lancashire; 224/7 (60 overs)	v	Kent; 200 (56.2 overs)
Clive Lloyd 66; John Dye 2/51 (12 overs)		Asif Iqbal 89; Peter Lever 3/24 (11.2 overs)

Lancashire won by 24 runs
Lord's, London
Umpires: Charlie Elliott and Arthur Fagg
Player of the match: Asif Iqbal (Kent)
