= List of Minor Counties West List A players =

Minor Counties West played in List A cricket matches between 1976 and 1978. This is a list of the players who appeared in those matches.

- Raymond Bailey (1978): RR Bailey
- Alan Burridge (1976–1978): AJ Burridge
- Brian Collins (1976–1978): BG Collins
- Francis Collyer (1976–1978): FE Collyer
- Richard Cooper (1976): RC Cooper
- David Daniels (1977): DM Daniels
- Micky Dunn (1976–1977): MT Dunn
- Malcolm Dunstan (1977–1978): MST Dunstan
- Keith Edwards (1976): JKS Edwards
- Peter Gooch (1978): PA Gooch
- Richard Gulliver (1976): RJ Gulliver
- Brian Jeffries (1978): BR Jeffries
- Robin Johns (1977): RL Johns
- David Johnston (1976): D Johnston
- Gwynne Jones (1976): GA Jones
- Keith Jones (1976–1977): KV Jones
- Peter Lewington (1978): PJ Lewington
- Richard Lewis (1978): RV Lewis
- Bill Merry (1978): WG Merry
- Mike Nurton (1977–1978): MD Nurton
- Wayne Osman (1978): WM Osman
- David Ottley (1976–1978): DG Ottley
- John Turner (1976): JB Turner
- Gary Wallen (1977–1978): G Wallen
- Doug Yeabsley (1976–1978): DI Yeabsley
