= Mike Crawhall =

English cricketer (1938–2023)

Personal information
- Full name: John Michael Crawhall
- Born: 21 February 1938; Newcastle, Northumberland, England
- Died: 2 June 2023 (aged 85); Lymington, Hampshire, England
- Batting: Right-handed

Domestic team information
- Years: Team
- 1962–1979: Northumberland
- 1972: Minor Counties North

Career statistics
Competition	List A
Matches	4
Runs scored	86
Batting average	28.66
100s/50s	–/1
Top score	66
Catches/stumpings	2/–
- Source: Cricinfo, 2 July 2011

John Michael Crawhall (21 February 1938 — 2 June 2023) was an English cricketer. Crawhall was a right-handed batsman. He was born in Newcastle upon Tyne, Northumberland and educated at Rugby School, where he represented the school cricket team.

Crawhall made his debut for Northumberland in the 1962 Minor Counties Championship against the Lancashire Second XI. Crawhall played Minor counties cricket for Northumberland from 1961 to 1979, which included 164 Minor Counties Championship appearances. He made his List A debut against Lincolnshire in the 1971 Gillette Cup. He made two further List A appearances for Northumberland, against Bedfordshire and Somerset, both in the 1977 Gillette Cup. In his three List A matches for the county, he scored 82 runs at an average of 41.00, with a high score of 66. This score came against Lincolnshire in 1971.

Playing for Northumberland allowed Crawhall to appear in a four List A matches, one in the 1972 Benson & Hedges Cup against Yorkshire. In this match, he scored 4 runs before being dismissed by Don Wilson. Crawhall died following a short illness in May 2023 at Lymington in Hampshire.
