= Breakwell =

Breakwell is a surname. Notable people with the surname include:

- Abbie Breakwell (born 2003), British wheelchair tennis player
- Arthur Breakwell (1881–1930), English footballer
- David Breakwell (born 1946), former English cricketer
- Dennis Breakwell (born 1948), former English first-class cricketer
- Glynis Breakwell, DBE (born 1952), the Vice-Chancellor of the University of Bath in Bath, England
- Ian Breakwell (1943–2005), British fine artist
- John V. Breakwell (1917–1991), American control theorist and a Professor of Astronautics at Stanford University
- Spike Breakwell (born 1968), British comedian
- Thomas Breakwell (1872–1902), the first Englishmen to become a Bahá’í
- Tom Breakwell (1915–unknown), an English professional footballer
