= 1974 Gillette Cup =

- Administrator: Test and County Cricket Board
- Cricket format: Limited overs cricket (60 overs per innings)
- Tournament format: Knockout
- Champions: Kent (2nd title)
- Participants: 22
- Matches: 21
- Most runs: 282 Brian Luckhurst (Kent)
- Most wickets: 10 Barry Wood (Lancashire)
- Official website: CricketArchive tournament page

The 1974 Gillette Cup was the twelfth Gillette Cup, an English limited overs county cricket tournament. It was held between 29 June and 7 September 1974. The tournament was won by Kent County Cricket Club who defeated Lancashire County Cricket Club by 4 wickets in the final at Lord's.

== Format ==
The seventeen first-class counties, were joined by five Minor Counties: Buckinghamshire, Durham, Hertfordshire, Lincolnshire and Shropshire. Teams who won in the first round progressed to the second round. The winners in the second round then progressed to the quarter-final stage. Winners from the quarter-finals then progressed to the semi-finals from which the winners then went on to the final at Lord's which was held on 7 September 1974.

=== First round ===
29 June 1974
(scorecard)

Derbyshire; 86 all out (48.5 overs)	v	Hampshire; 87/1 (20.2 overs)
Lawrence Rowe 20; Mike Taylor 3/17 (10 overs)		Barry Richards 41*; Colin Tunnicliffe 1/19 (3 overs)

Hampshire won by 9 wickets
County Ground, Derby
Umpires: Ron Aspinall & Dusty Rhodes
Player of the match: Mike Taylor (Hampshire)

29 June 1974
(scorecard)

Glamorgan; 155 all out (54.3 overs)	v	Lincolnshire; 156/4 (53 overs)
Malcolm Nash 51; Martin Maslin 3/29 (12 overs)		Martin Maslin 62*; Tony Cordle 2/19 (10 overs)

Lincolnshire won by 6 wickets
St. Helen's, Swansea
Umpires: David Constant & Ken Palmer
Player of the match: Martin Maslin (Lincolnshire)

29 June, 1 July 1974
(scorecard)

Lancashire; 201/6 (60 overs)	v	Gloucestershire; 151 all out (51.1 overs)
David Lloyd 54; David Graveney 2/15 (6 overs)		Roger Knight 35; Peter Lever 4/29 (11 overs)

Lancashire won by 50 runs
Ashley Down Ground, Bristol
Umpires: Bill Alley & Arthur Jepson
Player of the match: Peter Lever (Lancashire)

- Match was scheduled for one day but extended to two.

29 June 1974
(scorecard)

Durham; 155 all out (59.3 overs)	v	Hertfordshire; 81 all out (41.3 overs)
Tim Hughes 35; Brian Collins 3/36 (12 overs)		James Wright 19; Stan Stoker 3/16 (12 overs)

Durham won by 74 runs
Hitchin Town Cricket Club Ground, Hitchin
Umpires: Arthur Fagg & John Langridge
Player of the match: Stan Stoker (Durham)

29 June 1974
(scorecard)

Buckinghamshire; 223/5 (60 overs)	v	Kent; 224/3 (57 overs)
John Turner 88; Richard Elms 2/49 (12 overs)		Graham Johnson 120*; Gwynne Jones 1/31 (9 overs)

Kent won by 7 wickets
St Lawrence Ground, Canterbury
Umpires: Lloyd Budd & Jack Crapp
Player of the match: John Turner (Buckinghamshire)

29 June 1974
(scorecard)

Essex; 180 all out (60 overs)	v	Shropshire; 41 all out (36.1 overs)
Brian Edmeades 39; Geoffrey Othen 4/34 (12 overs)		Steve Johnson 18; John Lever 4/15 (12 overs)

Essex won by 139 runs
Orleton Park, Wellington
Umpires: Barrie Meyer & George Pope
Player of the match: John Lever (Essex)

=== Second round ===
10 July 1974
(scorecard)

Essex; 216 all out (59.3 overs)	v	Somerset; 219/6 (58 overs)
Ken McEwan 63; Hallam Moseley 3/30 (11.3 overs)		Peter Denning 57; Keith Pont 2/50 (12 overs)

Somerset won by 4 wickets
Chalkwell Park, Westcliff-on-Sea
Umpires: Arthur Jepson & Dusty Rhodes
Player of the match: Peter Denning (Somerset)

10 July 1974
(scorecard)

Kent; 287/2 (60 overs)	v	Durham; 171 all out (59.5 overs)
Brian Luckhurst 129; Brian Lander 2/58 (12 overs)		Tim Hughes 28; Norman Graham 3/18 (12 overs)

Kent won by 116 runs
St Lawrence Ground, Canterbury
Umpires: Dickie Bird & Tom Spencer
Player of the match: Colin Cowdrey (Kent)

10 July 1974
(scorecard)

Leicestershire; 182/8 (60 overs)	v	Northamptonshire; 62 all out (34 overs)
John Steele 85; Colin Milburn 3/44 (12 overs)		George Sharp 17; Norman McVicker 4/26 (9 overs)

Leicestershire won by 120 runs
Grace Road, Leicester
Umpires: Jack Crapp & Cec Pepper
Player of the match: John Steele (Leicestershire)

10 July 1974
(scorecard)

Surrey; 266/5 (60 overs)	v	Lincolnshire; 143 all out (44.1 overs)
Younis Ahmed 76; John Dale 2/58 (11 overs)		Martin Maslin 58; Geoff Arnold 5/15 (10 overs)

Surrey won by 123 runs
Lindum Sports Club Ground, Lincoln
Umpires: Ron Aspinall & Eddie Phillipson
Player of the match: Geoff Arnold (Surrey)

10, 11 July 1974
(scorecard)

Lancashire; 193/9 (60 overs)	v	Middlesex; 112 all out (50 overs)
David Hughes 42; Keith Jones 6/28 (12 overs)		Keith Jones 27; Barry Wood 4/26 (12 overs)

Lancashire won by 81 runs
Lord's, London
Umpires: Lloyd Budd & Henry Horton
Player of the match: Keith Jones (Middlesex)

- Match was scheduled for one day but extended to two.

10, 11 July 1974
(scorecard)

Worcestershire; 259/6 (60 overs)	v	Sussex; 110 all out (45.5 overs)
Basil D'Oliveira 102; Tony Greig 4/52 (12 overs)		Peter Graves 44; James Cumbes 4/23 (12 overs)

Worcestershire won by 149 runs
County Ground, Hove
Umpires: Ray Julian & Hugo Yarnold
Player of the match: Basil D'Oliveira (Worcestershire)

- Match was scheduled for one day but extended to two.

10, 11 July 1974
(scorecard)

Warwickshire; 225/7 (60 overs)	v	Nottinghamshire; 228/6 (59.1 overs)
Deryck Murray 72*; Garfield Sobers 3/28 (12 overs)		Michael Smedley 63*; Bob Willis 3/32 (12 overs)

Nottinghamshire won by 4 wickets
Edgbaston, Birmingham
Umpires: Sam Cook & Alan Whitehead
Player of the match: Michael Smedley (Nottinghamshire)

- Match was scheduled for one day but extended to two.

10, 11 July 1974
(scorecard)

Yorkshire; 233/6 (60 overs)	v	Hampshire; 192 all out (54.5 overs)
John Hampshire 87*; Andy Roberts 2/22 (12 overs)		David Turner 68; Barrie Leadbeater 3/47 (8.5 overs)

Yorkshire won by 41 runs
Park Avenue, Bradford
Umpires: David Evans & Peter Wight
Player of the match: John Hampshire (Yorkshire)

- Match was scheduled for one day but extended to two.

=== Quarter-finals ===
31 July 1974
(scorecard)

Kent; 295/8 (60 overs)	v	Leicestershire; 229 all out (54.1 overs)
Brian Luckhurst 125; Norman McVicker 3/61 (12 overs)		Brian Davison 82; Derek Underwood 4/57 (11 overs)

Kent won by 66 runs
St Lawrence Ground, Canterbury
Umpires: David Evans & Henry Horton
Player of the match: Brian Luckhurst (Kent)

31 July 1974
(scorecard)

Surrey; 254/7 (60 overs)	v	Somerset; 257/5 (58.2 overs)
John Edrich 59; Hallam Moseley 4/31 (12 overs)		Peter Denning 112; Robin Jackman 2/50 (12 overs)

Somerset won by 5 wickets
County Ground, Taunton
Umpires: John Langridge & Cec Pepper
Player of the match: Peter Denning (Somerset)

31 July, 1 August 1974
(scorecard)

Worcestershire; 251/9 (60 overs)	v	Nottinghamshire; 233/9 (60 overs)
Keith Wilkinson 95; Barry Stead 5/44 (12 overs)		Garfield Sobers 84; Basil D'Oliveira 4/18 (12 overs)

Worcestershire won by 128 runs
New Road, Worcester
Umpires: Eddie Phillipson & Peter Wight
Player of the match: Basil D'Oliveira (Worcestershire)

- Match was scheduled for one day but extended to two.

31 July, 1 August 1974
(scorecard)

Lancashire; 205 all out (59 overs)	v	Yorkshire; 173 all out (54.3 overs)
Clive Lloyd 90; Graham Stevenson 4/57 (12 overs)		Geoff Boycott 39; Peter Lever 4/17 (12 overs)

Lancashire won by 32 runs
Headingley, Leeds
Umpires: Barrie Meyer & Hugo Yarnold
Player of the match: Clive Lloyd (Lancashire)

- Match was scheduled for one day but extended to two.

=== Semi-finals ===
14 August 1974
(scorecard)

Somerset; 154 all out (58 overs)	v	Kent; 155/7 (52.3 overs)
Derek Taylor 49; John Shepherd 3/30 (12 overs)		Mike Denness 35; Bob Clapp 2/17 (10.3 overs)

Kent won by 3 wickets
St Lawrence Ground, Canterbury
Umpires: John Langridge & George Pope
Player of the match: Alan Knott (Kent)

14, 15 August 1974
(scorecard)

Lancashire; 236/7 (60 overs)	v	Worcestershire; 208 all out (58.2 overs)
Barry Wood 91; Brian Brain 4/51 (12 overs)		Glenn Turner 47; Jack Simmons 5/49 (12 overs)

Lancashire won by 28 runs
New Road, Worcester
Umpires: Jack Crapp & Ken Palmer
Player of the match: Barry Wood (Lancashire)

- Match was scheduled for one day but extended to two.

=== Final ===
7, 9 September 1974
(scorecard)

Lancashire; 118 all out (60 overs)	v	Kent; 122/6 (46.5 overs)
Clive Lloyd 25; Norman Graham 2/14 (11 overs)		John Shepherd 19; Barry Wood 3/18 (12 overs)

Kent won by 4 wickets
Lord's, London
Umpires: David Constant & Charlie Elliott
Player of the match: Alan Knott (Kent)

- Match was scheduled for one day but extended to two.
