= Paul Willis (cricketer) =

English cricketer (born 1952)

Personal information
- Full name: William Paul Willis
- Born: 15 June 1952 (age 74); Durham, County Durham, England
- Batting: Right-handed
- Bowling: Right-arm fast-medium

Domestic team information
- Years: Team
- 1974–1979: Lincolnshire

Career statistics
Competition	List A
Matches	3
Runs scored	31
Batting average	31.00
100s/50s	0/0
Top score	31
Balls bowled	150
Wickets	1
Bowling average	114.00
5 wickets in innings	–
10 wickets in match	–
Best bowling	1/29
Catches/stumpings	2/–
- Source: Cricinfo, 25 June 2011

William Paul Willis (born 15 June 1952) is a former English cricketer. Willis was a right-handed batsman who bowled right-arm fast-medium. He was born in Durham, County Durham.

Willis made his debut for Lincolnshire in the 1974 Minor Counties Championship against the Yorkshire Second XI. Willis played Minor counties cricket for Lincolnshire from 1974 to 1979, which included 30 Minor Counties Championship matches. He made his List A debut against Glamorgan in the 1st round of the 1974 Gillette Cup. He played 2 further List A matches for Lincolnshire, against Surrey in the 2nd round of the 1974 tournament and Derbyshire in the 1976 Gillette Cup. In his 3 matches, he scored 31 runs and took a single wicket, which came at an overall cost of 114 runs.
