= Basil Hollington =

English cricketer (born 1949)

Personal information
- Full name: Hugh Basil Hollington
- Born: 14 August 1949 (age 77); Harpenden, Hertfordshire, England
- Batting: Left-handed

Domestic team information
- Years: Team
- 1972: Minor Counties
- 1972–1974: Minor Counties South
- 1966–1974: Hertfordshire

Career statistics
Competition	First-class	List A
Matches	1	7
Runs scored	21	193
Batting average	10.50	27.57
100s/50s	–/–	–/2
Top score	15	78
Balls bowled	–	1
Wickets	–	–
Bowling average	–	–
5 wickets in innings	–	–
10 wickets in match	–	–
Best bowling	–	–
Catches/stumpings	–/–	2/–
- Source: Cricinfo, 5 September 2011

Hugh Basil Hollington (born 14 August 1949) is a former English cricketer. Hollington was a left-handed batsman. He was born in Harpenden, Hertfordshire.

Hollington made his debut for Hertfordshire in the 1966 Minor Counties Championship against Suffolk. He played Minor counties cricket for Hertfordshire from 1966 to 1974, making 44 appearances. He made his List A debut against Surrey in the 1971 Gillette Cup. In this match, he scored 50 runs before being dismissed by Pat Pocock. He made a further List A appearance for the county in the 1974 Gillette Cup against Durham. In this match, he was dismissed for a duck by Brian Lander.

Playing Minor counties cricket allowed Hollington to make a single first-class appearance for the Minor Counties cricket team against the touring Australians in 1972. In this match, he was dismissed for 15 runs in the Minor Counties first-innings by Jeff Hammond, while in their second-innings he was dismissed for 6 runs by Graeme Watson. He also made List A appearances for Minor Counties South, first appearing for the team in the 1972 Benson & Hedges Cup against Gloucestershire. He made four further List A appearances for the team, the last of which came against Somerset in the 1974 Benson & Hedges Cup. In his five appearances for the team, he scored 143 runs at an average of 28.60, with a high score of 78. His highest score came against Gloucestershire in 1972.
