= Colin Roper =

English cricketer

Personal information
- Born: 25 July 1936 (age 90); Litton Cheney, Dorset, England
- Batting: Right-handed
- Role: Wicket-keeper

Domestic team information
- Years: Team
- 1957: Hampshire
- 1959–1969: Dorset

Career statistics
Competition	First-class	List A
Matches	1	1
Runs scored	7	0
Batting average	7.00	0.00
100s/50s	0/0	0/0
Top score	7	0
Catches/stumpings	1/–	0/–
- Source: Cricinfo, 13 February 2010

Colin Roper (born 25 July 1936) is a former English first-class cricketer.

Roper was born in July 1936 at Litton Cheney, Dorset. He made a single first-class appearance as a wicket-keeper for Hampshire against Oxford University at the University Parks in 1957. Oxford University won the toss and elected to bat first, making 317 for 8 declared in their first-innings, during which Roper took a single catch behind the stumps, to dismiss Richard Jowett off the bowling of Malcolm Heath. In response, Hampshire made 229 all out in their first-innings, during which Roper scored 7 runs, before he was dismissed by Jack Bailey. Oxford University declared in their second-innings on 151 for 4, with Hampshire then reaching 137 for 5 in their second-innings, at which point the match was declared a draw.

He later played for Dorset, making his debut for the county in the 1959 Minor Counties Championship against Berkshire. He made 79 further appearances for the county in the Minor Counties Championship, the last of which came against the Somerset Second XI in 1969. He also made a single List A one-day appearance for Dorset in the 1968 Gillette Cup against Bedfordshire at Sherborne School. Batting at number three in the batting order, Roper was dismissed for a duck by Bill Bushby, with Bedfordshire winning the match by 8 wickets to progress to the next round.
