= Graham Warner =

English cricketer

Personal information
- Full name: Graham Sydney Warner
- Born: 27 November 1945 (age 80); Darlaston, Staffordshire, England
- Batting: Right-handed
- Bowling: Right-arm off break
- Role: Occasional wicket-keeper
- Relatives: Rachel Warner. Grandchildren Tom and Sam Cooksey

Domestic team information
- Years: Team
- 1976–1987: Staffordshire
- 1966–1971: Warwickshire

Career statistics
Competition	First-class	List A
Matches	30	14
Runs scored	965	210
Batting average	23.53	17.50
100s/50s	2/2	–/2
Top score	118*	56
Balls bowled	32	–
Wickets	–	–
Bowling average	–	–
5 wickets in innings	–	–
10 wickets in match	–	–
Best bowling	–	–
Catches/stumpings	14/–	4/–
- Source: Cricinfo, 7 July 2011

Graham Sydney Warner (born 27 November 1945) is a former English cricketer. Warner was a right-handed batsman who bowled right-arm off break, and who occasionally kept wicket. He was born in Darlaston, Staffordshire.

Warner made his first-class debut for Warwickshire against Oxford University. He made 29 further first-class appearances for Warwickshire, the last of which came against Kent in the 1971 County Championship. In his 30 first-class matches, he scored 965 runs at an average of 23.53, scoring 2 centuries and 2 half-centuries as well. His highest first-class score of 118 not out came against Scotland in 1968. He made his List A debut for Warwickshire against the touring West Indians. He made 9 further List A appearances for the county, the last of which came against Surrey in the 1971 John Player League. In his 10 limited-overs appearances, he scored 83 runs at an average of 10.37, with a high score of 39. He left Warwickshire at the end of the 1971 season.

He joined Staffordshire in 1976, making his debut for the county in the Minor Counties Championship against Cheshire. He played Minor counties cricket for Staffordshire from 1976 to 1987, making 82 Minor Counties Championship appearances 4 MCCA Knockout Trophy appearances. He made his first List A appearance for Staffordshire against Essex in the 1976 Gillette Cup. He made 3 further List A appearances for Staffordshire, the last coming against Glamorgan in the 1986 NatWest Trophy. In his 4 List A matches for the county, he scored 127 runs at an average of 31.75, with a high score of 56. This score, one of 2 half centuries he made for Staffordshire in List A cricket, came against Essex in 1976.
