= Trevor Morley (cricketer) =

English cricketer

Personal information
- Full name: Trevor Grahame Anthony Morley
- Born: 11 August 1933; Hitchin, Hertfordshire
- Died: 1 March 2013 (aged 79); March, Cambridgeshire
- Batting: Right-handed
- Bowling: Right-arm medium

Domestic team information
- Years: Team
- 1953–1960: Hertfordshire
- 1961–1975: Bedfordshire

Career statistics
| Competition | List A |
|---|---|
| Matches | 3 |
| Runs scored | 3 |
| Batting average | 3.00 |
| 100s/50s | 0/0 |
| Top score | 2* |
| Balls bowled | 204 |
| Wickets | 6 |
| Bowling average | 21.33 |
| 5 wickets in innings | 0 |
| 10 wickets in match | 0 |
| Best bowling | 3/52 |
| Catches/stumpings | 0/– |
- Source: Cricinfo, 5 August 2011

Trevor Grahame Anthony Morley (11 August 1933 – 1 March 2013) was an English cricketer. Morley was a right-handed batsman who bowled right-arm medium pace. He was born at Hitchin, Hertfordshire.

Morley made his debut in county cricket for Hertfordshire against Cambridgeshire in the 1953 Minor Counties Championship. He played Minor counties cricket for Hertfordshire from 1953 to 1960, making 37 Minor Counties Championship appearances. He later joined Bedfordshire, making his debut for the county in the 1961 Minor Counties Championship against Lincolnshire. He played Minor counties cricket for Bedfordshire from 1961 to 1975, making 80 Minor Counties Championship appearances. He made his List A debut against Buckinghamshire in the 1970 Gillette Cup. He made 2 further List A appearances, against Essex in the 1971 Gillette Cup and Lancashire in the 1973 Gillette Cup. In his 3 matches, he took 6 wickets at an average of 21.33, with best figures of 3/52.

Outside of cricket he had worked as a youth worker, as well as coaching cricket at King's Ely. He died at March, Cambridgeshire on 1 March 2013.
