= Terrence Johnson =

Terrence Johnson may refer to:

- Terrence Johnson (American football)
- Terrence Johnson (basketball)

== See also ==
- Terry Johnson (disambiguation)
