= Robert Burton (cricketer, born 1943) =

English cricketer (born 1943)

Personal information
- Full name: Robert Lingen Burton
- Born: 20 April 1943 (age 83); Pointe-à-Pierre, Trinidad and Tobago
- Batting: Right-handed
- Bowling: Right-arm medium

Domestic team information
- Years: Team
- 1964–1978: Shropshire

Career statistics
Competition	List A
Matches	3
Runs scored	53
Batting average	17.66
100s/50s	–/–
Top score	47
Catches/stumpings	2/–
- Source: Cricinfo, 4 July 2011

Robert Lingen Burton (born 20 April 1943) is a Trinidadian born English former cricketer. Burton was a right-handed batsman who bowled right-arm medium pace. He was born in Pointe-à-Pierre, Trinidad and Tobago. He was educated in England at Dean Close School and the Royal Agricultural College, Cirencester.

Burton made his debut for Shropshire in the 1964 Minor Counties Championship against the Somerset Second XI. Burton played Minor counties cricket for Shropshire from 1964 to 1978, which included 113 Minor Counties Championship appearances. He made his List A debut against Essex in the 1974 Gillette Cup. He made 2 further List A appearances, against Yorkshire in the 1976 Gillette Cup and Surrey in the 1978 Gillette Cup. In his 3 List A matches, he scored 53 runs at an average of 17.66, with a high score of 47.

Burton is the father of Richard Peter Lingen Burton, who is also a Shropshire county cricketer as well as National Hunt jockey.
