= Terry Johnson (cricketer) =

English cricketer

Personal information
- Full name: Terry Johnson
- Born: 28 June 1941 (age 85); Grantham, Lincolnshire, England
- Batting: Right-handed

Domestic team information
- Years: Team
- 1963–1976: Lincolnshire

Career statistics
| Competition | List A |
|---|---|
| Matches | 5 |
| Runs scored | 33 |
| Batting average | 6.60 |
| 100s/50s | –/– |
| Top score | 14 |
| Balls bowled | – |
| Wickets | – |
| Bowling average | – |
| 5 wickets in innings | – |
| 10 wickets in match | – |
| Best bowling | – |
| Catches/stumpings | 1/– |
- Source: Cricinfo, 26 June 2011

Terry Johnson (born 28 June 1941) is a former English cricketer. Johnson was a right-handed batsman.

== Early life ==
He was born in Grantham, Lincolnshire. He lived on Pillared House Lane in Gainsborough, working as a joiner.

== Career ==
Johnson made his debut for Lincolnshire in the 1963 Minor Counties Championship against the Yorkshire Second XI. Johnson played Minor counties cricket for Lincolnshire from 1963 to 1976, which included 72 Minor Counties Championship matches. He made his List A debut against Northumberland in the 1971 Gillette Cup. He played 4 further List A matches for Lincolnshire, the last coming against Derbyshire in the 1976 Gillette Cup. In his 5 matches, he scored 33 runs at an average of 6.60, with a high score of 14.
