= Colin McManus (cricketer) =

English cricketer

Personal information
- Full name: Colin Alan McManus
- Born: 19 September 1943 (age 83); Norwich, Norfolk, England
- Batting: Right-handed
- Role: Wicket-keeper

Domestic team information
- Years: Team
- 1975: Minor Counties North
- 1966–1975: Norfolk

Career statistics
Competition	List A
Matches	3
Runs scored	27
Batting average	9.00
100s/50s	–/–
Top score	16
Balls bowled	–
Wickets	–
Bowling average	–
5 wickets in innings	–
10 wickets in match	–
Best bowling	–
Catches/stumpings	2/–
- Source: Cricinfo, 29 June 2011

Colin Alan McManus (born 19 September 1943) is a former English cricketer. McManus was a right-handed batsman who fielded as a wicket-keeper. He was born in Norwich, Norfolk.

McManus made his debut for Norfolk in the 1966 Minor Counties Championship against Staffordshire. McManus played Minor counties cricket for Norfolk from 1966 to 1975, which included 56 Minor Counties Championship matches. He made his List A debut for Norfolk against Cheshire in the 1968 Gillette Cup. In this match, he was dismissed for 16 runs by Arthur Sutton. He made a further List A for the county appearance against Yorkshire in the 1969 Gillette Cup. In this match, he was dismissed for 10 runs by Brian Close.

In 1975, he made a single List A appearance for Minor Counties North in the Benson & Hedges Cup against Yorkshire. In this match, McManus was dismissed for a single run by Arthur Robinson.
