= Stan Stoker =

English cricketer

Personal information
- Full name: John Stanley Stoker
- Born: 29 May 1944; Bearpark, County Durham, England
- Died: 10 October 2015 (aged 71)
- Batting: Right-handed
- Bowling: Right-arm medium-fast

Domestic team information
- Years: Team
- 1973–1976: Durham
- 1966–1968: Dorset

Career statistics
Competition	List A
Matches	2
Runs scored	13
Batting average	6.50
100s/50s	–/–
Top score	9
Balls bowled	144
Wickets	3
Bowling average	20.00
5 wickets in innings	–
10 wickets in match	–
Best bowling	3/16
Catches/stumpings	1/–
- Source: Cricinfo, 7 August 2011

John Stanley "Stan" Stoker (29 May 1944 – 10 October 2015) was an English cricketer. Stoker was a right-handed batsman who bowled right-arm medium-fast. He was born in Bearpark, County Durham.

Stoker made his debut in the Minor Counties cricket for Dorset, first appearing for the county in the 1966 Minor Counties Championship against Wiltshire. He played Minor counties cricket for Dorset from 1966 to 1968, making 14 Minor Counties Championship appearances. He later joined his native county of Durham, making his debut for the county against Cumberland in the 1973 Minor Counties Championship. He played Minor counties cricket for Durham from 1973 to 1976, making 36 Minor Counties Championship appearances. He made his List A for Durham debut against Hertfordshire in the 1974 Gillette Cup. He took 3 wickets in the match for the cost of 16 runs from 12 overs, while with the bat he scored 4 runs before being dismissed by Alan Garofall. Durham won the match by 74 runs. He made a further List A appearance against Kent in the following round of the same competition. He bowled 12 wicket-less overs in this match, while with the bat he was dismissed for 9 runs by Colin Cowdrey, with Kent winning by 116 runs.
