= Richard Elms =

English cricketer

Personal information
- Full name: Richard Burtenshaw Elms
- Born: 5 April 1949 (age 77); Sutton, Surrey, England
- Batting: Right-handed
- Bowling: Left-arm fast-medium

Domestic team information
- Years: Team
- 1970–1976: Kent
- 1977–1978: Hampshire

Career statistics
Competition	First-class	List A
Matches	72	54
Runs scored	558	77
Batting average	11.16	7.00
100s/50s	0/0	0/0
Top score	48	19
Balls bowled	8,672	2,298
Wickets	116	52
Bowling average	39.70	30.88
5 wickets in innings	4	0
10 wickets in match	0	0
Best bowling	5/38	3/27
Catches/stumpings	17/–	11/–
- Source: Cricinfo, 10 January 2010

Richard Burtenshaw Elms (born 5 April 1949) is an English former professional cricketer. He played first-class and List A one-day cricket for Kent and Hampshire County Cricket Clubs as a left-arm fast-medium bowler, before embarking on a coaching career in South Africa.

== Cricket career ==
=== With Kent ===
Elms was born in Sutton in April 1949. He was educated at Bexleyheath-Erith Technical High School. Having played for Kent Club and Ground, made his debut in first-class cricket for Kent County Cricket Club against Hampshire at Maidstone in the 1970 County Championship, in what was his only appearance that season. The following season, he made seven appearances in the 1971 County Championship, but took only 8 wickets at an expensive bowling average of 47.12. In the same season, he made his debut in List A one-day cricket against Sussex at Tunbridge Wells in the John Player League, with Elms making four appearances in that season's competition. In 1972, he made three first-class appearances, alongside four one-day appearances. Despite the departure of fast-medium bowler John Dye to Northamptonshire at the end of the 1971 season, who had kept Elms out of the first eleven, he was unable to establish himself the Kent starting eleven following his departure.

Elms finally established himself in the Kent team in the 1973 season, helped somewhat by Bernard Julien's departure in June for Test duty with the West Indies, with him making eighteen first-class appearances that season. In these, he took 32 wickets at an average of 40.40, whilst claiming two five wicket hauls. His thirteen one-day appearances in 1973 saw Elms take just 11 wickets, at average of 42.18. With Julien out through injury for most of the 1974 season, Elms gained an extended run in the Kent team. His fifteen first-class appearances that season saw him take 23 wickets at an average of 37.82, whilst in one-day cricket he took 12 wickets from thirteen matches at an average of 26.66. He spent the next two seasons with Kent, but found his opportunities increasingly limited. Following a back injury toward the tailend of the 1976 season, Kent decided he would not be retained for the 1977 season.

In 72 first-class matches for Kent, he took 89 wickets at an average of 40.34, with four five wicket hauls. In one-day cricket, he took 45 wickets at an average of 30.62. During his time at Kent, it was noted by Carlow (2024) that his bowling was often erratic, with control his length and direction often deserting him. As a batsman in first-class cricket, he scored 362 runs at a batting average of 9.52, with a highest score of 31 not out. Carlow noted that there were some at Kent who believed Elms had not lived up to his potential as a batsman; a week prior to his release by Kent, he had scored two centuries in the same match playing for the Kent seconds.

=== Move to Hampshire ===
Ahead of the 1977 season, Elms joined Hampshire. Following the 1976 season, he coached in South Africa, before making his debut for Hampshire against Somerset at Southampton in the 1977 County Championship. During his debut season for Hampshire, he made fourteen first-class and seven one-day appearances. He claimed 26 first-class wickets at an average of 35.61 during his debut season at Hampshire, The following season he featured in just three matches in the County Championship, alongside a single one-day appearance. He was subsequently released by Hampshire in August 1978.

After leaving professional cricket, Elms moved to South Africa where he became a cricket coach in North-West Transvaal.

== Works cited ==
- Carlaw, Derek (2024). Kent County Cricketers A to Z. Part Three: 1946–1999 (PDF). Cardiff: ACS.
