= Richard Downend =

English cricketer and rugby union player

Personal information
- Full name: Richard Hugh Downend
- Born: 19 January 1945 (age 81); Stoke-on-Trent, Staffordshire, England
- Batting: Right-handed
- Bowling: Right-arm medium

Domestic team information
- Years: Team
- 1971–1972: Minor Counties North
- 1972: Minor Counties
- 1964–1977: Staffordshire

Career statistics
Competition	First-class	List A
Matches	1	9
Runs scored	6	84
Batting average	3.00	9.33
100s/50s	–/–	–/–
Top score	5	24
Balls bowled	114	408
Wickets	1	13
Bowling average	71.00	20.00
5 wickets in innings	–	–
10 wickets in match	–	–
Best bowling	1/71	3/31
Catches/stumpings	–/–	1/–
- Source: Cricinfo, 7 July 2011

Richard Hugh Downend (born 19 January 1945) is a former English cricketer and rugby union player. In cricket, Downend was a right-handed batsman who bowled right-arm medium pace. He was born in Stoke-on-Trent, Staffordshire.

== Cricket ==
Downend made his debut for Staffordshire in the 1964 Minor Counties Championship against Bedfordshire. He played Minor counties cricket for Staffordshire from 1964 to 1977, making 62 Minor Counties Championship appearances. He made his List A debut against Glamorgan in the 1971 Gillette Cup. He made 3 further List A appearances for Staffordshire, the last coming against Glamorgan in the 1975 Gillette Cup. In his 4 List A matches for Staffordshire, he scored 76 runs at an average of 19.00, with a high score of 24. With the ball, he took 6 wickets at a bowling average of 21.00, with best figures of 3/35.

He made his only first-class appearance for the Minor Counties cricket team against the touring Australians. In this match, he took the wicket of Ashley Mallett for the cost of 71 runs from 19 overs. With the bat, he was dismissed for 5 runs in the Minor Counties first-innings for 5 runs by John Gleeson, while in their second-innings he scored a single run before being dismissed by Graeme Watson. He also played List A cricket for Minor Counties North, making his debut for the team in the 1972 Benson & Hedges Cup against Nottinghamshire. He made 4 further List A appearances for the team, the last of which came against Nottinghamshire in the 1975 Benson & Hedges Cup. With the ball, he took 7 wickets at an average of 19.14, with best figures of 3/31.

== Rugby ==
Downend was also a notable rugby union player, although he was never received an international cap.

Amongst the teams he played for were Sale, Birkenhead Park and Staffordshire RFC.
