= John Sunley =

English cricketer

Personal information
- Full name: John Sunley
- Born: 10 October 1946; Grimsby, Lincolnshire, England
- Died: 6 August 2009 (aged 62); Humberston, Lincolnshire, England
- Batting: Right-handed
- Bowling: Right-arm medium

Domestic team information
- Years: Team
- 1976–1977: Minor Counties East
- 1966–1984: Lincolnshire

Career statistics
Competition	List A
Matches	8
Runs scored	71
Batting average	10.14
100s/50s	–/–
Top score	15
Balls bowled	24
Wickets	2
Bowling average	8.00
5 wickets in innings	–
10 wickets in match	–
Best bowling	1/5
Catches/stumpings	1/–
- Source: Cricinfo, 26 June 2011

John Sunley (10 October 1946 – 6 August 2009) was an English cricketer. Sunley was a right-handed batsman who bowled right-arm medium pace. He was born in Grimsby, Lincolnshire.

Sunley made his debut for Lincolnshire in the 1966 Minor Counties Championship against Shropshire. Sunley played Minor counties cricket for Lincolnshire from 1966 to 1984, which included 42 Minor Counties Championship matches. He made his List A debut against Hampshire in the 1966 Gillette Cup. He played 3 further List A matches for Lincolnshire, the last coming against Derbyshire in the 1976 Gillette Cup. In his 4 matches for Lincolnshire, he scored 26 runs at an average of 6.50, with a high score of 14. With the ball, he took 2 wickets for Lincolnshire, at a bowling average of 7.00.

He also played List A cricket for Minor Counties East, making his debut for the team in the 1976 Benson & Hedges Cup against Essex. He played 3 further matches for the team, the last coming against Yorkshire in the 1977 Benson & Hedges Cup. In these 4 matches, he scored 45 runs at an average of 15.00, with a high score of 15.

He died suddenly at his home in Humberston, Lincolnshire on 6 August 2009. Following his death students at the Grimsby Institute of Further & Higher Education, where Sunley worked as a lecturer for 27 years, launched a fund in memory of him.
