= Quentin Hughes (cricketer) =

English cricketer

Personal information
- Full name: Quentin John Hughes
- Born: 17 October 1974 (age 52); Durham, County Durham, England
- Batting: Left-handed
- Bowling: Right-arm off break
- Relatives: Tim Hughes (father)

Domestic team information
- Years: Team
- 2003: Cumberland
- 2000–2002: Durham Cricket Board
- 1997–2000: Cambridge University
- 1991: Durham

Career statistics
Competition	FC	LA
Matches	28	5
Runs scored	1,086	135
Batting average	31.94	27.00
100s/50s	2/5	–/1
Top score	119	51
Balls bowled	479	84
Wickets	5	1
Bowling average	64.60	75.00
5 wickets in innings	–	–
10 wickets in match	–	–
Best bowling	2/73	1/53
Catches/stumpings	7/–	1/–
- Source: Cricinfo, 7 November 2010

Quentin John Hughes (born 17 October 1974) is an English cricketer. Hughes is a left-handed batsman who bowls right-arm off break. He was born in Durham, County Durham.

Hughes attended Durham Johnston Comprehensive School and St Edmund's College, Cambridge. He made his debut in County Cricket for Durham in the 1991 Minor Counties Championship against Norfolk. He played one further match for the county in the 1991 season, which came against Suffolk. With Durham's elevation to the County Championship and with it first-class status, Hughes' services were no longer required by the county.

In 1997, he made his debut in first-class cricket for Cambridge University against Derbyshire. From 1997 to 2000, he represented the university in 27 first-class matches, the last of which came against Oxford University. He also played a single match for a British Universities team against the touring New Zealanders in 1999. In his 28 first-class matches, he scored 1,086 runs at a batting average of 31.94, with 5 half centuries and 2 centuries, with a high score of 119. In the field he took 7 catches. With the ball he took 5 wickets at a bowling average of 64.60, with best figures of 2/73.

Hughes later represented the Durham Cricket Board in List A cricket. His debut List A match came against Northamptonshire in the 2000 NatWest Trophy. From 2000 to 2002, he represented the Board in 4 List A matches, the last of which came against Herefordshire in the 2nd round of the 2003 Cheltenham & Gloucester Trophy which was held in 2002.

In 2003, he joined Cumberland where he played 2 Minor Counties Championship matches for the county in that season against Hertfordshire and Northumberland. He also played his final List A match for Cumberland, which came against Scotland in the 1st round of the 2004 Cheltenham & Gloucester Trophy which was held in 2003. In his combined total of 5 List A matches, he scored 135 runs at an average of 27.00, with a single half century high score of 51. In the field he also took 2 catches. With the ball he took a single wicket at an average of 75.00, with best figures of 1/53.

He currently plays club cricket for Chester-le-Street Cricket Club in the North East Premier League.

== Family ==
His father, Tim, played List A and Minor counties cricket for Durham.
