= 1976 Gillette Cup =

- Administrator: Test and County Cricket Board
- Cricket format: Limited overs cricket (60 overs per innings)
- Tournament format: Knockout
- Champions: Northamptonshire (1st title)
- Participants: 22
- Matches: 21
- Most runs: 240 Zaheer Abbas (Gloucestershire)
- Most wickets: 10 Eddie Barlow (Derbyshire)
- Official website: CricketArchive tournament page

The 1976 Gillette Cup was the fourteenth Gillette Cup, an English limited overs county cricket tournament. It was held between 26 June and 4 September 1976. The tournament was won by Northamptonshire County Cricket Club who defeated Lancashire County Cricket Club by 4 wickets in the final at Lord's.

== Format ==
The seventeen first-class counties, were joined by five Minor Counties: Berkshire, Hertfordshire, Lincolnshire, Shropshire and Staffordshire. Teams who won in the first round progressed to the second round. The winners in the second round then progressed to the quarter-final stage. Winners from the quarter-finals then progressed to the semi-finals from which the winners then went on to the final at Lord's which was held on 4 September 1976.

=== First round ===
26 June 1976
(scorecard)

| Lincolnshire; 125/7 (60 overs) | v | Derbyshire; 129/3 (34.3 overs) |
| Ian Moore 31; Eddie Barlow 3/19 (12 overs) | | Eddie Barlow 55; Ian Moore 1/4 (1 overs) |

Derbyshire won by 7 wickets
Rutland Recreation Ground, Ilkeston
Umpires: Barrie Meyer & Don Oslear
Player of the match: Eddie Barlow (Derbyshire)

26 June 1976
(scorecard)

| Gloucestershire; 260/4 (60 overs) | v | Worcestershire; 242 all out (58.2 overs) |
| Zaheer Abbas 128; John Inchmore 2/55 (12 overs) | | Phil Neale 68; Mike Procter 3/35 (11 overs) |

Gloucestershire won by 18 runs
Phoenix County Ground, Bristol
Umpires: Sam Cook & John Langridge
Player of the match: Zaheer Abbas (Gloucestershire)

26 June 1976
(scorecard)

| Berkshire; 158/8 (60 overs) | v | Hertfordshire; 160/8 (57.1 overs) |
| David Johnston 68; Brian Collins 5/20 (12 overs) | | Francis Collyer 30; Alexander Mahoney 4/32 (12 overs) |

Hertfordshire won by 2 wickets
Hitchin Town Cricket Club Ground, Hitchin
Umpires: David Evans & Tommy Wilson
Player of the match: Brian Collins (Hertfordshire)

26 June 1976
(scorecard)

| Shropshire; 185 all out (59.4 overs) | v | Yorkshire; 189/6 (56.1 overs) |
| Robert Burton 47; Arthur Robinson 3/17 (12 overs) | | John Hampshire 59; David Breakwell 3/28 (11.1 overs) |

Yorkshire won by 4 wickets
Orleton Park, Wellington
Umpires: David Constant & Cec Pepper
Player of the match: John Hampshire (Yorkshire)

26 June 1976
(scorecard)

| Essex; 316/6 (60 overs) | v | Staffordshire; 207/7 (60 overs) |
| Brian Edmeades 93; Keith Stride 3/66 (12 overs) | | Graham Warner 56; John Lever 2/38 (12 overs) |

Essex won by 109 runs
Lichfield Road, Stone
Umpires: Ron Aspinall & Ken Palmer
Player of the match: Brian Edmeades (Essex)

26 June 1976
(scorecard)

| Glamorgan; 283/3 (60 overs) | v | Warwickshire; 287/6 (59 overs) |
| Alan Jones 124*; Bill Bourne 1/46 (12 overs) | | John Whitehouse 109; Roger Davis 3/55 (12 overs) |

Warwickshire won by 4 wickets
Edgbaston, Birmingham
Umpires: Ray Julian & Tom Spencer
Player of the match: Alan Jones (Glamorgan)

=== Second round ===
14 July 1976
(scorecard)

| Derbyshire; 194/9 (60 overs) | v | Surrey; 127 all out (45.5 overs) |
| Frederick Swarbrook 58*; Geoff Arnold 3/27 (12 overs) | | Alan Butcher 51; Keith Stevenson 4/21 (8 overs) |

Derbyshire won by 67 runs
Rutland Recreation Ground, Ilkeston
Umpires: Dickie Bird & Cec Pepper
Player of the match: Frederick Swarbrook (Derbyshire)

14 July 1976
(scorecard)

| Hertfordshire; 153 all out (55.3 overs) | v | Essex; 120 all out (38 overs) |
| David Ottley 37; Ray East 4/28 (11 overs) | | Ken McEwan 44; Dilip Doshi 4/23 (12 overs) |

Hertfordshire won by 33 runs
Hitchin Town Cricket Club Ground, Hitchin
Umpires: Arthur Fagg & Alan Whitehead
Player of the match: Dilip Doshi (Hertfordshire)

14 July 1976
(scorecard)

| Sussex; 213 all out (59.1 overs) | v | Kent; 156 all out (50 overs) |
| Tony Greig 62; Kevin Jarvis 3/53 (9 overs) | | Bob Woolmer 34; Tony Greig 3/45 (12 overs) |

Sussex won by 57 runs
St Lawrence Ground, Canterbury
Umpires: Jack Crapp & Ray Julian
Player of the match: Mike Denness (Kent)

14 July 1976
(scorecard)

| Middlesex; 270/9 (60 overs) | v | Lancashire; 271/7 (58.4 overs) |
| Graham Barlow 71; Jack Simmons 3/89 (12 overs) | | Harry Pilling 82; Allan Jones 3/52 (11.4 overs) |

Lancashire won by 3 wickets
Old Trafford, Manchester
Umpires: Arthur Jepson & Peter Rochford
Player of the match: Harry Pilling (Lancashire)

14 July 1976
(scorecard)

| Hampshire; 233/8 (60 overs) | v | Leicestershire; 230/9 (60 overs) |
| David Turner 78; Ray Illingworth 2/37 (12 overs) | | Jack Birkenshaw 101*; Mike Taylor 2/44 (10 overs) |

Hampshire won by 3 runs
Grace Road, Leicester
Umpires: Ron Aspinall & Henry Horton
Player of the match: Jack Birkenshaw (Leicestershire)

14 July 1976
(scorecard)

| Northamptonshire; 275/5 (60 overs) | v | Nottinghamshire; 267/9 (60 overs) |
| Geoff Cook 79; Clive Rice 2/53 (12 overs) | | Derek Randall 73; Alan Hodgson 2/60 (12 overs) |

Northamptonshire won by 8 wickets
Trent Bridge, Nottingham
Umpires: Eddie Phillipson & Dusty Rhodes
Player of the match: Peter Willey (Northamptonshire)

14 July 1976
(scorecard)

| Somerset; 140 all out (45.2 overs) | v | Warwickshire; 141/4 (40.3 overs) |
| Brian Close 69; Bill Bourne 2/15 (5 overs) | | John Jameson 47; Graham Burgess 2/42 (12 overs) |

Warwickshire won by 6 wickets
Edgbaston, Birmingham
Umpires: John Langridge & Ken Palmer
Player of the match: Brian Close (Somerset)

14 July 1976
(scorecard)

| Yorkshire; 232/9 (60 overs) | v | Gloucestershire; 233/6 (55 overs) |
| John Hampshire 63; Mike Procter 4/21 (12 overs) | | Zaheer Abbas 111; Arthur Robinson 2/52 (12 overs) |

Gloucestershire won by 4 wickets
Headingley, Leeds
Umpires: Barrie Meyer & Don Oslear
Player of the match: Zaheer Abbas (Gloucestershire)

=== Quarter-finals ===
4 August 1976
(scorecard)

| Hampshire; 226 all out (60 overs) | v | Derbyshire; 179 all out (54.4 overs) |
| Peter Sainsbury 63; Mike Hendrick 4/35 (12 overs) | | Ron Headley 48; Peter Sainsbury 4/49 (12 overs) |

Hampshire won by 47 runs
County Ground, Southampton
Umpires: Bill Alley & Peter Rochford
Player of the match: Peter Sainsbury (Hampshire)

4 August 1976
(scorecard)

| Gloucestershire; 125 all out (57.1 overs) | v | Lancashire; 128/3 (37.2 overs) |
| Andy Stovold 35; David Hughes 2/15 (12 overs) | | Barry Wood 62*; Jack Davey 2/6 (8 overs) |

Lancashire won by 7 wickets
Old Trafford, Manchester
Umpires: Eddie Phillipson & Dusty Rhodes
Player of the match: Barry Wood (Lancashire)

4 August 1976
(scorecard)

| Hertfordshire; 69 all out (44 overs) | v | Northamptonshire; 75/1 (15.2 overs) |
| Robin Johns 18*; Sarfraz Nawaz 4/17 (12 overs) | | Peter Willey 52*; Alan Garofall 1/11 (2.2 overs) |

Northamptonshire won by 9 wickets
County Ground, Northampton
Umpires: Lloyd Budd & Arthur Jepson
Player of the match: Sarfraz Nawaz (Northamptonshire)

4 August 1976
(scorecard)

| Sussex; 194 all out (56.3 overs) | v | Warwickshire; 195/2 (46.2 overs) |
| Javed Miandad 69; Steve Rouse 4/27 (8.3 overs) | | Dennis Amiss 87; Javed Miandad 1/12 (2 overs) |

Warwickshire won by 8 wickets
County Ground, Hove
Umpires: Sam Cook & Peter Wight
Player of the match: John Jameson (Warwickshire)

=== Semi-finals ===
18 August 1976
(scorecard)

| Hampshire; 215/7 (60 overs) | v | Northamptonshire; 218/8 (59.5 overs) |
| David Turner 86; Sarfraz Nawaz 2/40 (12 overs) | | Roy Virgin 82; John Southern 2/34 (12 overs) |

Northamptonshire won by 2 wickets
County Ground, Southampton
Umpires: Bill Alley & David Evans
Player of the match: David Turner (Hampshire)

18 August 1976
(scorecard)

| Warwickshire; 233 all out (60 overs) | v | Lancashire; 234/4 (55.2 overs) |
| Rohan Kanhai 49; Barry Wood 3/32 (10 overs) | | Barry Wood 105; Steve Rouse 2/41 (12 overs) |

Lancashire won by 6 wickets
Edgbaston, Birmingham
Umpires: Lloyd Budd & Alan Whitehead
Player of the match: Barry Wood (Lancashire)

=== Final ===
4 September 1976
(scorecard)

| Lancashire; 195/7 (60 overs) | v | Northamptonshire; 199/6 (58.1 overs) |
| David Lloyd 48; Bishan Bedi 3/52 (11 overs) | | Peter Willey 65; Peter Lee 2/29 (12 overs) |

Northamptonshire won by 4 wickets
Lord's, London
Umpires: Dickie Bird & Arthur Fagg
Player of the match: Peter Willey (Northamptonshire)
