= Tim Hughes (cricketer) =

English cricketer

Personal information
- Full name: Timothy John Hughes
- Born: 25 September 1943 (age 83); Escrick, Yorkshire, England
- Batting: Left-handed
- Bowling: Right-arm medium
- Relatives: Quentin Hughes (son)

Domestic team information
- Years: Team
- 1972–1978: Durham

Career statistics
Competition	LA
Matches	2
Runs scored	63
Batting average	31.50
100s/50s	–/–
Top score	35
Balls bowled	3
Wickets	1
Bowling average	0.00
5 wickets in innings	–
10 wickets in match	–
Best bowling	1/0
Catches/stumpings	–/–
- Source: Cricinfo, 7 November 2010

Timothy 'Tim' John Hughes (born 25 September 1943) is a former English cricketer. Hughes was a left-handed batsman who bowled right-arm medium pace. He was born at Escrick, Yorkshire.

Hughes studied at Durham University (St John's College). In 1972 he earned a Diploma in Education, having previously completed a Bachelor of Arts degree at the same institution.

He made his debut for Durham in the 1972 Minor Counties Championship against Cheshire. From 1972 to 1978, he represented the county in 15 Championship matches, the last of which came against Cumberland. He also represented Durham in 2 List A matches against Hertfordshire and Kent in the 1974 Gillette Cup. In his 2 List A matches, he scored 63 runs at a batting average of 31.50, with a high score of 31. With the ball he bowled 3 deliveries, without conceding a run and in the process taking a single wicket, thereby leaving him with a bowling average of 0.00.

His son, Quentin, played first-class cricket for Cambridge University. He also played List A cricket for the Durham Cricket Board and Cumberland, as well as Minor counties cricket for Durham in 1991.
