= Martin Maslin =

English cricketer (born 1942)

Personal information
- Full name: Martin Maslin
- Born: 14 March 1942 (age 84); Grimsby, Lincolnshire, England
- Batting: Right-handed
- Bowling: Leg break / Right-arm medium pace

Domestic team information
- Years: Team
- 1976: Minor Counties East
- 1972–1975: Minor Counties North
- 1964–1974: Minor Counties
- 1961–1980: Lincolnshire

Career statistics
Competition	First-class	List A
Matches	5	24
Runs scored	274	484
Batting average	30.44	23.04
100s/50s	0/2	1/2
Top score	66*	103*
Balls bowled	36	758
Wickets	0	12
Bowling average	–	39.75
5 wickets in innings	0	0
10 wickets in match	0	0
Best bowling	–	3/29
Catches/stumpings	2/–	12/–
- Source: Cricinfo, 5 August 2011

Martin Maslin (born 14 March 1942) is a former English cricketer. Maslin was a right-handed batsman who bowled both leg break and right-arm medium pace. The son of Lincolnshire cricketer Norman Maslin, he was born in Grimsby, Lincolnshire, and educated at Haileybury and Imperial Service College, where he represented the college cricket team.

Maslin made his debut for Lincolnshire against Shropshire in the 1961 Minor Counties Championship. He played Minor counties cricket for Lincolnshire from 1961 to 1980, making 109 Minor Counties Championship appearances.

He made his List A debut against Hampshire in the 1966 Gillette Cup and played six further List A matches for Lincolnshire, the last of which came against Derbyshire in the 1976 Gillette Cup. In his seven List A matches for Lincolnshire, he scored 164 runs at an average of 32.80, with a high score of 62*. This score, his only List A fifty for Lincolnshire, came against Glamorgan in the 1974 Gillette Cup. With the ball, he took 4 wickets at an average of 39.50, with best figures of 3/29.

Maslin also played first-class cricket for the Minor Counties, making his debut against the touring Pakistanis in 1967. He made four further first-class appearances for the team, the last of which came against the touring Pakistanis in 1974. In his five first-class matches, he scored 274 runs at an average of 30.44, with a high score of 66*. This score came against the Pakistanis in 1967.

He also played List A cricket for Minor Counties North, making his debut against Nottinghamshire in the 1972 Benson & Hedges Cup. He made 12 further List A appearances for the team, the last of which came against Nottinghamshire in the 1975 Benson & Hedges Cup. In his 13 matches for the team, he scored 195 runs at an average of 15.00, with a high score of 47. With the ball, he took 6 wickets at an average of 25.50, with best figures of 3/33.

Additionally, he played List A cricket for Minor Counties East, making his debut against Nottinghamshire in the 1976 Benson & Hedges Cup. He made three further appearances for Minor Counties East, the last against Northamptonshire in the same competition. In his four matches for the team, he scored 125 runs at an average of 41.66, with a high score of 103*. This score came on debut against Nottinghamshire. With the ball, he took 2 wickets at an average of 83.00, with best figures of 1/24.
