= Geoffrey Plaskitt =

English cricketer (born 1940)

Personal information
- Full name: Geoffrey Plaskitt
- Born: 29 April 1940 (age 86); Grimsby, Lincolnshire, England
- Batting: Right-handed
- Bowling: Right-arm fast

Domestic team information
- Years: Team
- 1972: Minor Counties North
- 1963–1975: Lincolnshire

Career statistics
Competition	List A
Matches	6
Runs scored	7
Batting average	1.75
100s/50s	–/–
Top score	4
Balls bowled	417
Wickets	8
Bowling average	30.37
5 wickets in innings	–
10 wickets in match	–
Best bowling	3/61
Catches/stumpings	1/–
- Source: Cricinfo, 4 August 2011

Geoffrey Plaskitt (born 29 April 1940) is a former English cricketer. Plaskitt was a right-handed batsman who bowled right-arm fast. He was born in Grimsby, Lincolnshire.

Plaskitt made his debut for Lincolnshire against the Yorkshire Second XI in the 1963 Minor Counties Championship. He played Minor counties cricket for Lincolnshire from 1963 to 1975, making 66 Minor Counties Championship appearances. Plaskitt made his List A debut against Hampshire in the 1967 Gillette Cup. He made 4 further List A appearances for Lincolnshire, the last of which came against Surrey in the 1974 Gillette Cup. In his 5 List A matches for Lincolnshire, he took 7 wickets at an average of 29.57, with best figures of 3/61.

He also made a single List A appearance for Minor Counties North against Nottinghamshire in the 1972 Benson & Hedges Cup. In this match, he took the wicket of Graham Frost for the cost of 36 runs from 11 overs, while with the bat he was dismissed for 4 runs by Bob White, with Nottinghamshire winning by 55 runs.
