= John Dye (cricketer) =

English cricketer

Personal information
- Full name: John Cooper James Dye
- Born: 24 July 1942 (age 84); Gillingham, Kent
- Batting: Right-handed
- Bowling: Left arm fast-medium
- Role: Bowler

Domestic team information
- Years: Team
- 1962–1971: Kent
- 1972–1977: Northamptonshire
- 1972/73: Eastern Province

Career statistics
Competition	First-class	List A
Matches	266	171
Runs scored	774	221
Batting average	6.34	10.52
100s/50s	0/0	0/0
Top score	29*	23
Balls bowled	39,946	8,442
Wickets	725	235
Bowling average	23.82	21.36
5 wickets in innings	22	1
10 wickets in match	2	0
Best bowling	7/45	5/30
Catches/stumpings	53/–	53/–
- Source: CricInfo, 3 February 2010

John Cooper James Dye (born 24 July 1942) is a former English professional cricketer.

Dye was born at Gillingham in Kent in 1942. He first played for Kent County Cricket Club's Second XI in 1961 before making his first-class cricket debut for the county in May 1962 against Warwickshire at Coventry. Dye was a "burly left-arm quick bowler" who bowled powerfully and had an unfussy approach to the game. He was awarded his Second XI county cap in 1963 and made his List A cricket debut for Kent in the 1963 Gillette Cup. Awarded his full county cap in 1966, Dye went on to make 149 first-class and 51 limited-over appearances for Kent between 1962 and 1971. He was part of the Kent team which won the 1970 County Championship and played in the 1971 Gillette Cup final on the losing team.

After being released by Kent at the end of the 1971 season, Dye joined Northamptonshire County Cricket Club. He played 112 first-class and 117 limited-overs matches for Northants, winning the 1976 Gillette Cup with the county. He was released by Northants at the end of the 1977 season and played for Bedfordshire County Cricket Club in the Minor Counties Championship in 1978 and 1979. In the 1972/73 South African cricket season Dye played for Eastern Province in the Currie Cup competitions. He played in over 400 senior cricket matches and took almost 1,000 wickets throughout this senior career.

Dye took his first coaching qualification in 1966 and was an active coach during his time with Kent. He coached in schools in South Africa and, after leaving professional cricket, he became the coach at Wellingborough School from 1983 to 2002. After retiring Dye moved to Spain where he remained active as a cricket coach at the La Manga Club in Murcia. As of 2017 he remains involved with the development of cricket in Spain as Chairman of the East Coast and Central League.
