= Lists of Scottish cricketers =

Lists of Scottish cricketers include:

- List of Scotland national cricket captains
- List of Scotland ODI cricketers
- List of Scotland women ODI cricketers
- List of Scotland Twenty20 International cricketers
- List of Scotland women Twenty20 International cricketers
- List of Scottish cricket and football players

== See also ==
- Lists of English cricketers
