= Paul Rawden =

English cricketer (born 1973)

Personal information
- Full name: Paul Anthony Rawden
- Born: 15 July 1973 (age 53); Stamford, Lincolnshire, England
- Batting: Right-handed
- Bowling: Right-arm medium

Domestic team information
- Years: Team
- 1992–1997: Lincolnshire

Career statistics
Competition	List A
Matches	3
Runs scored	21
Batting average	7.00
100s/50s	–/–
Top score	21
Balls bowled	24
Wickets	–
Bowling average	–
5 wickets in innings	–
10 wickets in match	–
Best bowling	–
Catches/stumpings	1/–
- Source: Cricinfo, 24 June 2011

Paul Anthony Rawden (born 15 July 1973) is a former English cricketer. Rawden was a right-handed batsman who bowled right-arm medium pace. He was born in Stamford, Lincolnshire.

Rawden made his debut for Lincolnshire in the 1992 MCCA Knockout Trophy against Cumberland. Rawden played Minor counties cricket for Lincolnshire from 1992 to 1997, which included 39 Minor Counties Championship matches and 11 MCCA Knockout Trophy matches. He made his List A debut against Glamorgan in the 1994 NatWest Trophy. He played 2 further List A matches for Lincolnshire, against Gloucestershire in the 1996 NatWest Trophy and Derbyshire in the 1997 NatWest Trophy. In his 3 matches, he scored 21 runs at an average of 7.00, with a high score of 21, with Rawden scoring ducks in two of his three innings.
