= Terry Johnson =

Terry Johnson may refer to:

== Entertainment ==
- Terry Johnson (dramatist) (born 1955), British dramatist and director
- Terry "Buzzy" Johnson (1938–2025), American popular music singer, songwriter and music producer

== Politicians ==
- Terry Johnson (Georgia politician) (born 1950), American, Georgia state representative
- Terry Johnson (Ohio politician) (born 1956), American, member of the Ohio House of Representatives

== Sports ==
- Terry Johnson (cricketer) (born 1941), former English cricketer
- Terry Johnson (footballer) (born 1949), British footballer
- Terry Johnson (ice hockey) (born 1958), Canadian ice hockey player
- Tank Johnson (Terry Johnson, born 1981), American football defensive tackle
- Terry Johnson (basketball), American basketball coach

== Other ==
- Terry Johnson (entrepreneur) (1935–2010), American entrepreneur in data storage

== See also ==
- Terrence Johnson (disambiguation)
