= David Breakwell =

English cricketer

Personal information
- Full name: David Hilton Breakwell
- Born: 16 June 1946 (age 80); Bridgnorth, Shropshire, England
- Batting: Right-handed
- Bowling: Right-arm fast-medium

Domestic team information
- Years: Team
- 1964–1978: Shropshire

Career statistics
Competition	List A
Matches	2
Runs scored	0
Batting average	–
100s/50s	–/–
Top score	0*
Balls bowled	139
Wickets	5
Bowling average	12.40
5 wickets in innings	–
10 wickets in match	–
Best bowling	3/28
Catches/stumpings	–/–
- Source: Cricinfo, 4 July 2011

David Hilton Breakwell (born 16 June 1946) is a former English cricketer. Ranells was a right-handed batsman who bowled right-arm fast-medium. He was born in Bridgnorth, Shropshire, and educated at Bridgnorth Grammar School.

Breakwell made his debut for Shropshire in the 1964 Minor Counties Championship against the Warwickshire Second XI. Breakwell played Minor counties cricket for Shropshire from 1964 to 1978, which included 47 Minor Counties Championship appearances. He made his List A debut against Essex in the 1974 Gillette Cup. In this match, took 2 wickets for the cost of 34 runs from 12 overs. He made a further List A appearance against Yorkshire in the 1976 Gillette Cup. He took 3 wickets for the cost of 28 runs from 11.1 overs.
