= Michael Hodson =

English cricketer

Personal information
- Full name: Michael David Hodson
- Born: 2 August 1942 (age 84); Grimsby, Lincolnshire, England
- Batting: Right-handed
- Role: Wicket-keeper

Domestic team information
- Years: Team
- 1979: Minor Counties North
- 1974–1978: Lincolnshire

Career statistics
Competition	List A
Matches	3
Runs scored	20
Batting average	10.00
100s/50s	0/0
Top score	16*
Catches/stumpings	0/0
- Source: Cricinfo, 25 June 2011

Michael David Hodson (born 2 August 1942) is a former English cricketer. Hodson was a right-handed batsman who fielded as a wicket-keeper. He was born in Grimsby, Lincolnshire.

Hodson made his debut for Lincolnshire in the 1974 Minor Counties Championship against the Yorkshire Second XI. Hodson played Minor counties cricket for Lincolnshire from 1974 to 1978, which included 40 Minor Counties Championship matches. He made his only List A appearance for Lincolnshire against Derbyshire in the 1976 Gillette Cup. He scored 16 unbeaten runs in the match. In 1979, he played 2 List A matches for Minor Counties North in the Benson & Hedges Cup against Kent and Middlesex.
