= Robin Johns =

English cricketer (born 1946)

Personal information
- Full name: Robert Leslie Johns
- Born: 30 June 1946 (age 80); Southampton, Hampshire, England
- Batting: Right-handed
- Bowling: Right-arm off break

Domestic team information
- Years: Team
- 1980: Minor Counties
- 1979: Minor Counties South
- 1977: Minor Counties West
- 1975–1986: Hertfordshire
- 1971: Northamptonshire
- 1970: Oxford University

Career statistics
Competition	First-class	List A
Matches	14	11
Runs scored	335	23
Batting average	16.75	3.83
100s/50s	–/1	–/–
Top score	61*	18*
Balls bowled	1,620	488
Wickets	17	12
Bowling average	42.94	31.91
5 wickets in innings	–	–
10 wickets in match	–	–
Best bowling	4/76	4/31
Catches/stumpings	9/–	3/–
- Source: Cricinfo, 2 October 2011

Robert 'Robin' Leslie Johns (born 30 June 1946) is a former English cricketer. Johns was a right-handed batsman who bowled right-arm off break. He was born in Southampton, Hampshire.

Johns made his first-class debut for Oxford University against Lancashire in 1970. He made seven further first-class appearances for the university in 1970. In his eight first-class appearances for the university, he scored 273 runs at an average of 21.00, with a high score of 61 not out. This score, which would be his only first-class fifty, came against Cambridge University. With the ball, he took 13 wickets at a bowling average of 51.61, with best figures of 4/76. In 1971, Johns joined Northamptonshire, making his debut for the county in the 1971 County Championship against Hampshire. He made five further first-class appearances for the county in 1971, the last of which came against Yorkshire. In his six first-class matches for Northamptonshire, he scored a total of 62 runs at an average of 8.85, with a high score of 20. With the ball, he took 4 wickets at an average of 14.75, with best figures of 3/20. He made a single List A appearance for the county against Yorkshire in the 1971 John Player League. He left Northamptonshire at the end of the 1971 season.

He joined Hertfordshire in 1975, making his debut for the county against Cambridgeshire in the Minor Counties Championship. He played Minor counties cricket for Hertfordshire from 1975 to 1986, making 65 Minor Counties Championship and six MCCA Knockout Trophy appearances. His first List A appearance for Hertfordshire came in their famous win against Essex in the 2nd round of the 1976 Gillette Cup. He made four further List A appearances for the county, the last of which came against Hampshire in the 1983 NatWest Trophy. He took a total of 8 wickets in his five matches, which came at an average of 25.00, with best figures of 4/31. He also played for a variety of combined Minor Counties teams. He played a single List A match for Minor Counties West in the 1977 Benson & Hedges Cup against Warwickshire, appeared in three List A matches for Minor Counties South in the 1979 Benson & Hedges Cup, and played a single List A match in the 1980 Benson & Hedges Cup for the Minor Counties cricket team.
