= Richard Burton (cricketer, born 1976) =

English cricketer (born 1976)

Richard Peter Lingen Burton (born 24 August 1976) was an English cricketer. He was a left-handed batsman and right-arm medium-pace bowler who played for Shropshire. He was born in Shrewsbury, and educated at Shrewsbury School, Wrekin College and Reading University.

Having represented Shropshire in the Minor Counties Championship since 1997, Burton made a single List A appearance for the team, in the C&G Trophy in September 2001. He scored 28 runs from the opening order.

Burton was also a National Hunt jockey and was Champion National Point to Point Novice Jockey in 1994.

Burton's father, Robert, made three appearances for the side between 1974 and 1978.
