= List of English men's international cricketers born outside of England =

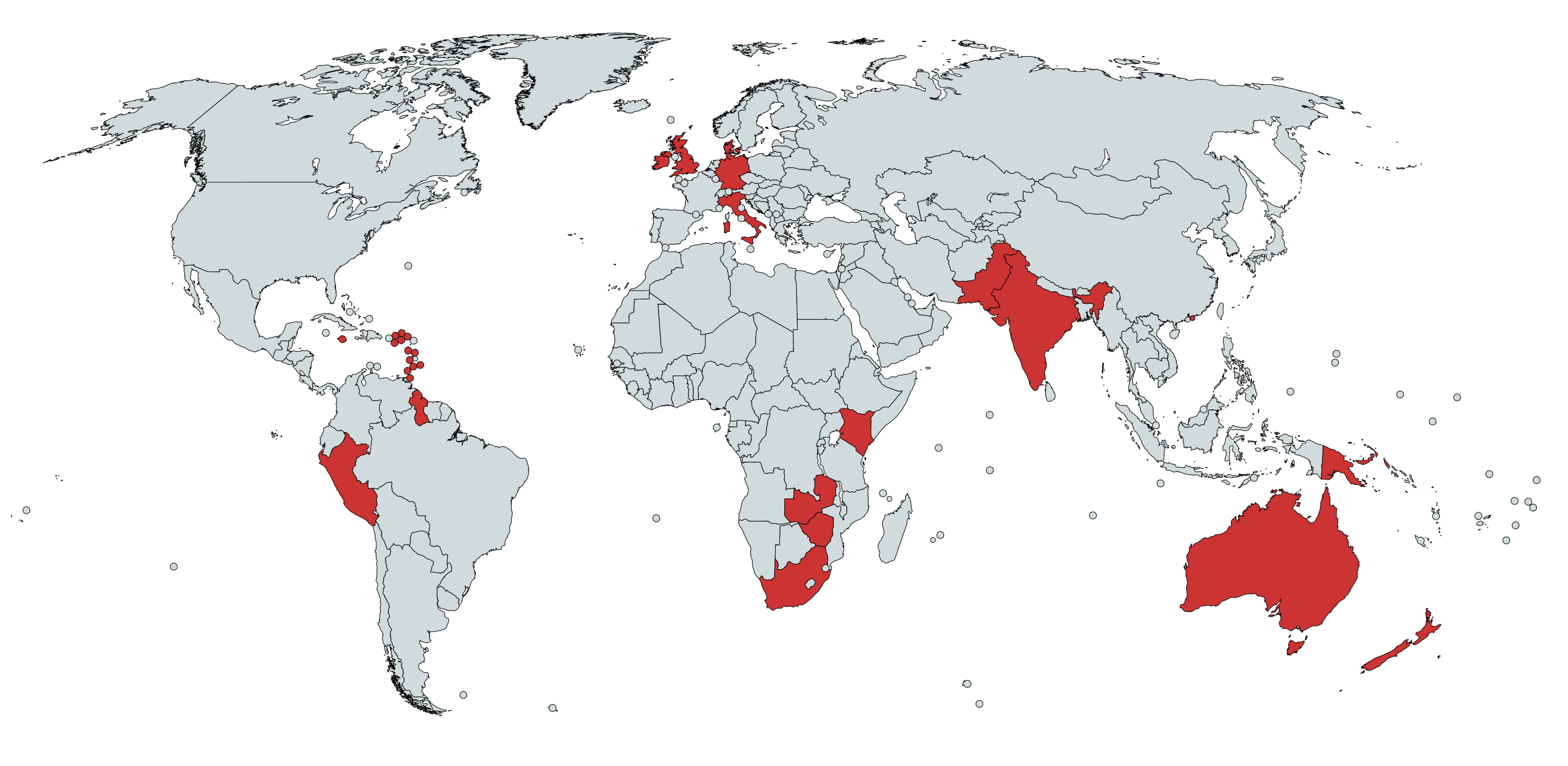
A map of the world showing which countries England's international cricketers were born in.

This is a list of cricketers born outside England who have represented England's cricket team at Test, One Day International, or T20I level.

The country of birth is the only criterion applied; therefore, some of the players below may have very little relationship with the country of their birth, while others were born and bred in that particular country.

Elsewhere, other England internationals may be associated with a country but are not listed below because they were actually born in England. For example, Matthew Maynard, who is often listed as a Welsh cricketer because of his links with Anglesey and Glamorgan, was born in Oldham, Lancashire.

Countries of birth are listed under their current names and according to their current borders to avoid possible confusion. Therefore, players born in what is now Zimbabwe are listed as such, regardless of whether they were born in Rhodesia, Southern Rhodesia or Zimbabwe. Similarly, Neal Radford was born in Luanshya in modern-day Zambia and is therefore listed under that country, although at the time Luanshya was part of the short-lived protectorate of Northern Rhodesia. Finally, Joseph McMaster is listed under Northern Ireland although his birthplace, County Down, was then part of Ireland.

Players born in seven Caribbean nations (Barbados, Guyana, Jamaica, Trinidad and Tobago, St Vincent and the Grenadines, Dominica and St Kitts and Nevis) have played for England. Combining these countries in the tradition of the West Indies cricket team would give a total of 14 players.

In recent years, the England team has been perceived to benefit hugely from players born in South Africa. Since Andrew Strauss made his ODI debut in 2003, thirteen other South African-born players have played international cricket for England.

After England won the World Cup final in 2019, references were made to the "diverse" nature of the team, which included four foreign-born players in the starting eleven: Eoin Morgan, Jason Roy, Ben Stokes and Jofra Archer.

As of 22 November 2024, 114 players born outside England have represented the national team, of a total of 773 players.

== List ==
Country of birth	Number	Players
South Africa	20	Basil D’Oliviera, Tony Greig, Ian Greig, Allan Lamb, Chris Smith, Robin Smith, Andrew Strauss, Kevin Pietersen, Matt Prior, Jonathan Trott, Craig Kieswetter, Jade Dernbach, Stuart Meaker, Nick Compton, Michael Lumb, Jason Roy, Keaton Jennings, Tom Curran, Brydon Carse, John Turner
India	17	K.S. Ranjitsinhji, Teddy Wynyard, Richard Young, Neville Tufnell, Douglas Jardine, Duleepsinhji, Nawab of Pataudi Sr., Errol Holmes, Norman Mitchell-Innes, George Emmett, Colin Cowdrey, John Jameson, Bob Woolmer, Robin Jackman, Nasser Hussain, Vikram Solanki, Min Patel
Wales	16	Johnnie Clay, Robert Croft, Jeff Jones, Tony Lewis, Austin Matthews, Hugh Morris, Gilbert Parkhouse, Pat Pocock, Greg Thomas, Maurice Turnbull, Cyril Walters, Steve Watkin, Allan Watkins, Simon Jones, Alan Jones, Phil Salt
Australia	10	Billy Murdoch, John Ferris, Sammy Woods, Albert Trott, Gubby Allen, Adam Hollioake, Ben Hollioake, Jason Gallian, Tim Ambrose, Sam Robson
Scotland	9	Mike Denness, Gavin Hamilton, Alec Kennedy, David Larter, Gregor MacGregor, Ian Peebles, Eric Russell, Dougie Brown, Peter Such
Republic of Ireland	5	Leland Hone, Sir Tim O'Brien, Frederick Fane, Ed Joyce, Eoin Morgan
Barbados	5	Roland Butcher, Gladstone Small, Chris Jordan, Jofra Archer, Jacob Bethell
Northern Ireland	3	Joseph McMaster, Martin McCague, Boyd Rankin
Zimbabwe	3	Graeme Hick, Paul Parker, Gary Ballance
Germany	2	Donald Carr, Paul Terry
Guyana	2	Chris Lewis, Monte Lynch
Jamaica	2	Norman Cowans, Devon Malcolm
Kenya	2	Derek Pringle, Jamie Dalrymple
New Zealand	2	Andy Caddick, Ben Stokes
Pakistan	2	Usman Afzaal, Owais Shah
Trinidad and Tobago	2	Lord Harris, Pelham Warner
St Vincent and the Grenadines	2	Wilf Slack, Neil Williams
Zambia	2	Phil Edmonds, Neal Radford
Hong Kong	2	Dermot Reeve, Sam Hain
Denmark	1	Amjad Khan
Dominica	1	Phillip DeFreitas
Italy	1	Ted Dexter
Papua New Guinea	1	Geraint Jones
Peru	1	Freddie Brown
St Kitts and Nevis	1	Joey Benjamin
