= List of Central Sparks cricketers =

This is an alphabetical list of cricketers who played for Central Sparks during their existence between 2020 and 2024. They first played in the Rachael Heyhoe Flint Trophy, a 50 over competition that began in 2020. In 2021, the Twenty20 Charlotte Edwards Cup was added to the women's domestic structure in England. At the end of the 2024 season, Central Sparks were effectively replaced by a professionalised Warwickshire team.

Players' names are followed by the years in which they were active as a Central Sparks player. Seasons given are first and last seasons; the player did not necessarily play in all the intervening seasons. This list only includes players who appeared in at least one match for Central Sparks; players who were named in the team's squad for a season but did not play a match are not included.

== A ==
- Ellie Anderson (2023)
- Emily Arlott (2020–2024)
- Meg Austin (2024)

== B ==
- Hannah Baker (2020–2024)
- Gabrielle Basketter (2022)
- Clare Boycott (2020–2022)
- Chloe Brewer (2023–2024)
- Thea Brookes (2020–2022)
- Erin Burns (2023)
- Stephanie Butler (2020–2022)

== C ==
- Ami Campbell (2022–2024)

== D ==
- Gwenan Davies (2020–2022)
- Poppy Davies (2020–2021)
- Georgia Davis (2020–2024)

== E ==
- Bethan Ellis (2023–2024)

== F ==
- Ria Fackrell (2021–2024)
- Abigail Freeborn (2022–2024)

== G ==
- Katie George (2023–2024)
- Sarah Glenn (2020–2022)
- Maddy Green (2023)

== H ==
- Hannah Hardwick (2024)
- Chloe Hill (2020–2021)
- Milly Home (2020–2022)

== J ==
- Amy Jones (2020–2024)
- Evelyn Jones (2020–2024)

== K ==
- Marie Kelly (2020–2021)

== P ==
- Anisha Patel (2020–2022)
- Charis Pavely (2023–2024)
- Davina Perrin (2021–2024)
- Grace Potts (2021–2024)

== R ==
- Elizabeth Russell (2020–2022)

== W ==
- Courtney Webb (2024)
- Issy Wong (2020–2024)

== Captains ==
No.	Name	Nationality	Years	First	Last	LA	T20	Total
1	Evelyn Jones	England	2020–2024	29 August 2020	30 August 2024	45	29	74
2	Georgia Davis	England	2023–2024	7 June 2023	16 June 2024	0	3	3
3	Abigail Freeborn	England	2024	4 September 2024	6 September 2024	2	0	2
