= Richard Burton (cricketer, born 1955) =

English cricketer

Personal information
- Full name: Richard Leslie Burton
- Born: 29 January 1955 (age 71); Thealby, Lincolnshire, England
- Batting: Right-handed
- Bowling: Right-arm medium

Domestic team information
- Years: Team
- 1976–1991: Lincolnshire
- 1974: Minor Counties North

Career statistics
Competition	List A
Matches	3
Runs scored	18
Batting average	9.00
100s/50s	–/–
Top score	9*
Balls bowled	126
Wickets	–
Bowling average	–
5 wickets in innings	–
10 wickets in match	–
Best bowling	–
Catches/stumpings	–/–
- Source: Cricinfo, 26 May 2012

Richard Leslie Burton (born 29 January 1955) is a former English cricketer. Burton was a right-handed batsman who bowled right-arm medium pace. He was born at Thealby, Lincolnshire.

Despite having not played any form of minor counties cricket, Burton made his List A debut for Minor Counties North against Lancashire in the 1974 Benson & Hedges Cup, scoring 5 runs in the match before he was dismissed by Clive Lloyd. Two years later he made his debut for Lincolnshire against Staffordshire in the 1976 Minor Counties Championship. He played minor counties cricket for Lincolnshire to 1991, making 60 Minor Counties Championship appearances, the last of which came against Staffordshire. He also made ten MCCA Knockout Trophy appearances. At the time, Lincolnshire were also permitted to take part in the NatWest Trophy, whose matches held List A status. Burton played two List A matches for Lincolnshire, against Surrey in the 1983 NatWest Trophy, and Lancashire in the 1986 NatWest Trophy.
