= Mike Smedley =

English cricketer (1941–2026)

Personal information
- Full name: Michael John Smedley
- Born: 28 October 1941; Maltby, South Yorkshire, England
- Died: 28 July 2026 (aged 84)
- Batting: Right-handed

Domestic team information
- Years: Team
- 1964–1979: Nottinghamshire
- FC debut: 22 July 1964 Nottinghamshire v Northants
- LA debut: 21 May 1966 Nottinghamshire v Worcestershire

Career statistics
Competition	First-class	List A
Matches	360	206
Runs scored	16,482	3,674
Batting average	31.21	21.73
100s/50s	28/79	0/14
Top score	149	75
Catches/stumpings	261/0	55/0
- Source: CricketArchive, 12 February 2017

Michael John Smedley (28 October 1941 – 28 July 2026) was an English first-class cricketer. He began his career with Yorkshire and played for the Second XI 1960–62. In 1963, he joined Nottinghamshire and made his first-class debut in 1964. Smedley, right-handed, was a specialist middle order batsman. Smedley was awarded his county cap in 1966 and had his benefit season in 1975, which raised £8,500. He assumed the club captaincy in 1975 and held the post for five seasons until his retirement in 1979. Smedley died on 28 July 2026, at the age of 84.

Sporting positions
Preceded by Jack Bond	Nottinghamshire County cricket captain 1975–79	Succeeded by Clive Rice
