= Eddie Rowe =

English cricketer

Personal information
- Full name: Edmund John Rowe
- Born: 21 July 1920; Netherfield, Nottinghamshire, England
- Died: 17 December 1989 (aged 69); Bridlington, Yorkshire, England
- Batting: Right-handed
- Role: Wicketkeeper

Domestic team information
- Years: Team
- 1949–1957: Nottinghamshire

Career statistics
Competition	First-class
Matches	103
Runs scored	295
Batting average	5.46
100s/50s	–/–
Top score	16
Catches/stumpings	152/52
- Source: CricketArchive, 12 November 2024

Edmund John Rowe (21 July 1920 – 17 December 1989) was an English first-class cricketer who played for Nottinghamshire between 1949 and 1957 as a wicketkeeper and tail-end batsman. He was awarded a county cap in 1954. He was born in Netherfield; died in Bridlington.
