= David Johnston (English cricketer) =

English cricketer

Personal information
- Full name: David Johnston
- Born: 17 April 1943 (age 83); Blackpool, Lancashire, England
- Batting: Right-handed
- Bowling: Leg break

Domestic team information
- Years: Team
- 1976: Minor Counties West
- 1975: Minor Counties South
- 1960–1980: Berkshire

Career statistics
Competition	LA
Matches	6
Runs scored	139
Batting average	23.16
100s/50s	–/1
Top score	68
Balls bowled	–
Wickets	–
Bowling average	–
5 wickets in innings	–
10 wickets in match	–
Best bowling	–
Catches/stumpings	–/–
- Source: Cricinfo, 24 September 2010

David Johnston (born 17 April 1943) is a former English cricketer. Johnston was a right-handed batsman who was a leg break bowler. He was born at Blackpool, Lancashire.

Watts made his Minor Counties Championship debut for Berkshire in 1960 against Devon. From 1960 to 1980, he represented the county in 115 Minor Counties Championship matches, the last of which came in the 1980 Championship when Berkshire played Devon.

Watts' List-A debut came in the 1975 Benson and Hedges Cup for Minor Counties South against Middlesex. The following season in the same competition, he represented Minor Counties West in 3 List-A matches, with his final appearance for the team coming against Worcestershire. He also played 2 List-A matches for Berkshire. His List-A debut for the county came against Hertfordshire in the 1976 Gillette Cup. His second and final List-A match for the county came in the 1979 Gillette Cup against Durham at Green Lane Cricket Ground, Durham. In his 6 career List-A matches, he scored 139 runs at a batting average of 23.16, with a high score of 68.
