= Arthur Breakwell =

English footballer

Personal information
- Full name: Arthur James Breakwell
- Date of birth: 1881
- Place of birth: Wolverhampton, England
- Date of death: 1930 (aged 48–49)
- Position: Winger

Senior career*
Years	Team	Apps	(Gls)
1904–1905	Sedgley		
1905–1906	Wolverhampton Wanderers	24	(3)
1907–1908	Brierley Hill Alliance		
1908	Bilston United		
Total		24	(3)
- * Club domestic league appearances and goals

Arthur James Breakwell (1881–1930) was an English footballer who played in the Football League for Wolverhampton Wanderers.
