= Hitchin Town Cricket Club Ground =

Cricket ground in Hitchin, England

Coordinates: 51°57′06″N 0°17′30″W

Hitchin Cricket Club Ground
- Blueharts
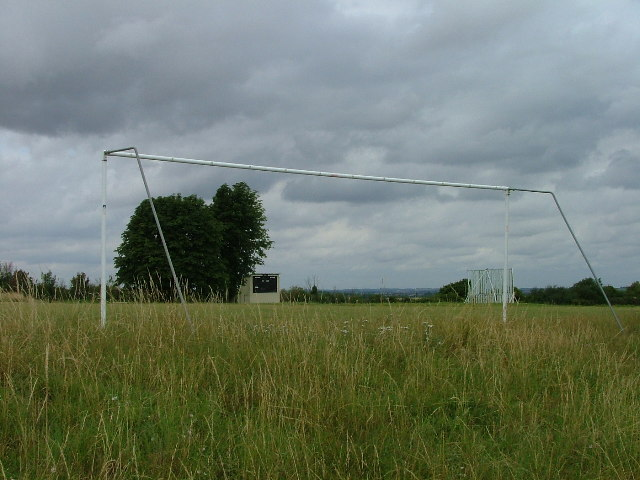
- Interactive map of Hitchin Cricket Club Ground

Ground information
- Location: Hitchin, Hertfordshire
- Country: England
- Establishment: 1877 (first recorded match)

Team information
Hertfordshire	(1908–1914 & 1951–1998)
- As of 25 July 2010; Source: Ground profile

Hitchin Cricket Club Ground is a cricket ground in Hitchin, Hertfordshire, England. The first recorded match on the ground was in 1877, when Hertfordshire played Essex. Hertfordshire played their first Minor Counties Championship match on the ground in 1908 against Cambridgeshire. Hertfordshire used the ground until 1914, and following a 37-year break from the ground, it returned in 1951. From 1914 to 1998, the ground played host to 38 Minor Counties Championship matches and 2 MCCA Knockout Trophy matches.

The ground has also hosted List-A matches, the first of which came in the 1966 Gillette Cup between Hertfordshire and Berkshire. From 1966 to 1989, the ground held 8 List-A matches, the last of which was between Hertfordshire and Nottinghamshire in the 1989 NatWest Trophy. The most famous List-A match on the ground saw Hertfordshire defeat first-class county Essex in the 1976 Gillette Cup.

In local domestic cricket, Hitchin Cricket Club Ground is the home ground of Hitchin Cricket Club. They play in the Hertfordshire Cricket League, their best position being in 1976 and in 2009 when they came second. The club shares their ground with the Blueharts Hockey Club and Hitchin Lacrosse Club. In 1988, the club constructed a second pitch at the ground.

Perhaps the biggest claim to fame for the club was in 1994, when the New Zealand cricket team started their tour of England with a match against Hitchin. The ground was also the scene of Hertfordshire County Cricket Club's victory over Essex County Cricket Club in the 1976 Gillette Cup - the first time a minor county had defeated a first class county in a major competition.
