= Bill Bushby =

English cricketer

Personal information
- Full name: William John Bushby
- Born: 26 September 1935; Southwick, Sussex
- Died: 9 March 2021 (aged 85); Eaton Socon, Cambridgeshire
- Batting: Right-handed
- Bowling: Right-arm medium

Domestic team information
- Years: Team
- 1961–1975: Bedfordshire

Career statistics
Competition	List A
Matches	6
Runs scored	110
Batting average	27.50
100s/50s	0/1
Top score	80*
Balls bowled	366
Wickets	4
Bowling average	56.00
5 wickets in innings	0
10 wickets in match	0
Best bowling	2/10
Catches/stumpings	2/–
- Source: Cricinfo, 3 August 2011

William John Bushby (26 September 1935 – 9 March 2021) was an English cricketer. He was a right-handed batsman who bowled right-arm medium pace. He was born in Southwick, Sussex.

Bushby made his debut for Bedfordshire against Shropshire in the 1961 Minor Counties Championship. He played minor counties cricket for Bedfordshire from 1961 to 1975, making 87 Minor Counties Championship appearances. He made his List A debut against Northamptonshire in the 1967 Gillette Cup. He made 5 further List A appearances, the last of which came against Lancashire in the 1973 Gillette Cup. In his 6 List A matches, he scored 110 runs at an average of 27.50, with a high score of 80 not out. This score was against Essex in the 1971 Gillette Cup. With the ball, he took 4 wickets at a bowling average of 56.00, with best figures of 2/10.

Bushby died on 9 March 2021, at the age of 85.
