= Richard Mercer =

English cricketer

Personal information
- Full name: Richard Anthony David Mercer
- Born: 14 January 1951; Stockholm, Sweden
- Died: 25 October 1996 (aged 45); Hexham, Northumberland, England
- Batting: Right-handed
- Role: Wicket-keeper

Domestic team information
- Years: Team
- 1979: Minor Counties North
- 1975–1988: Durham

Career statistics
Competition	List A
Matches	11
Runs scored	47
Batting average	5.87
100s/50s	–/–
Top score	23
Balls bowled	–
Wickets	–
Bowling average	–
5 wickets in innings	–
10 wickets in match	–
Best bowling	–
Catches/stumpings	1/2
- Source: Cricinfo, 7 August 2011

Richard Anthony David Mercer (14 January 1951 – 25 October 1996) was an English cricketer. Mercer was a right-handed batsman who fielded as a wicket-keeper. He was born in Stockholm, Sweden.

Mercer graduated from Durham University (University College) in 1973 with a degree in Politics and Sociology.

He made his debut for Durham against Northumberland in the 1973 Minor Counties Championship. He played Minor counties cricket for Durham from 1975 to 1988, making 104 Minor Counties Championship appearances and 7 MCCA Knockout Trophy appearances. He made his List A debut against Northamptonshire in the 1977 Gillette Cup. He made 8 further List A appearances for Durham, the last of which came against Warwickshire in the 1986 NatWest Trophy. In his 9 List A matches for Durham, he scored 47 runs at a batting average of 6.71, with a high score of 23. Behind the stumps he took a single catch and made 2 stumpings. He also played List A cricket for Minor Counties North, making 2 appearances against Yorkshire and Nottinghamshire in the 1979 Benson & Hedges Cup, though without success.

He died in Hexham, Northumberland on 25 October 1996.
