= Alexander Mahoney =

New Zealand cricketer

Alexander John Mahoney (born 30 January 1947) was a New Zealand cricketer. He was a right-handed batsman and slow left-arm bowler who played for Berkshire. He was born at Invercargill in 1947.

Mahoney played for Southland from the 1962–63 season. He studied at the University of Otago and in 1971–72 played for New Zealand Universities and for the Otago B team. He made two Hawke Cup appearances for Southland during the 1973–74 season before playing for Berkshire in the Minor Counties Championship between 1975 and 1976. He was awarded his County Cap in 1975.

Mahoney's sole List A cricket appearance came in the 1976 Gillette Cup, against Hertfordshire. He took four wickets during the match. Back in New Zealand, he played for Wairarapa between 1978–79 and 1983–84.
