= Peter Bradley (cricketer) =

English cricketer (born 1937)

Personal information
- Full name: Peter Bradley
- Born: 3 March 1937 (age 89); Gee Cross, Hyde, Cheshire, England
- Batting: Left-handed
- Bowling: Right-arm medium

Domestic team information
- Years: Team
- 1976: Minor Counties East
- 1973–1974: Minor Counties
- 1973–1975: Minor Counties North
- 1957–1975: Shropshire

Career statistics
Competition	First-class	List A
Matches	2	16
Runs scored	11	51
Batting average	11.00	8.50
100s/50s	–/–	–/–
Top score	9*	15*
Balls bowled	465	1,031
Wickets	9	13
Bowling average	27.66	43.69
5 wickets in innings	–	–
10 wickets in match	–	–
Best bowling	4/57	4/45
Catches/stumpings	3/–	2/–
- Source: Cricinfo, 3 August 2011

Peter Bradley (born 3 March 1937) is a former English cricketer. Bradley was a left-handed batsman who bowled right-arm medium pace. He was born in Gee Cross, Hyde, Cheshire.

Bradley made his debut for Shropshire against Staffordshire in the 1957 Minor Counties Championship. He played Minor counties cricket for Shropshire from 1957 to 1975, making 82 Minor Counties Championship appearances. When Shropshire won their first, and so far only, Minor Counties Championship in 1973, Bradley took 67 wickets at an average of 10.76, and Shropshire won seven of their 10 matches outright. Against Bedfordshire that season he took 6 for 43 and 5 for 2.

He made a single List A appearance for Shropshire against Essex in the 1974 Gillette Cup, He took the wicket of Brian Hardie for the cost of 45 runs from 12 overs, while with the bat he scored a single run before being dismissed by Robin Hobbs, as Shropshire were bowled out for 41 to lose the match by 139 runs. It was for a Minor Counties cricket team in one form or another that he made most of his List A appearances. He made his first List A appearance in the 1973 Benson & Hedges Cup for Minor Counties North against Lancashire. He made 10 further List A appearances for the team, the last of which came against Lancashire in the 1975 Benson & Hedges Cup. In his 11 matches for the team, he took 11 wickets at an average of 32.09, with best figures of 4/45. He also played List A cricket for Minor Counties East in the 1976 Benson & Hedges Cup, although he took just a single wicket at an overall cost of 170 runs.

He also made two first-class appearances for Minor Counties. Against the touring West Indians in 1973 he took the wickets of Lawrence Rowe, David Murray and Inshan Ali in the West Indians' first innings, while in their second innings he dismissed Rowe, Clive Lloyd, Ali and Vanburn Holder. In 1974 against the touring Pakistanis he took the wickets of Imran Khan and Aftab Gul.

He played club cricket for St George's in Telford and West Bromwich Dartmouth.

Bradley worked for Russells Rubber Works in Telford in sales and marketing.
