= James Wright (cricketer, born 1948) =

English cricketer

James Wright (born 24 January 1948) was an English cricketer. He was a right-handed batsman and right-arm medium-pace bowler who played for Hertfordshire. He was born in Hampstead.

Wright, who represented the team in the Minor Counties Championship between 1972 and 1983, made two List A appearances for the team, the first in 1974, in which he scored 19 runs and took figures of 0-47, and the second in 1981, in which he scored 14 not out and took figures of 1-38, taking the wicket of Graham Gooch.

Between 2003 and 2005, Wright played for Hertfordshire in the Over-50s County Championship.
