= Brian Ward (cricketer) =

English cricketer

Personal information
- Born: 28 February 1944 (age 82); Chelmsford, Essex, England
- Batting: Right-handed
- Role: Batsman

Domestic team information
- Years: Team
- 1967–1972: Essex

Career statistics
Competition	FC	List A
Matches	128	70
Runs scored	4799	1443
Batting average	23.64	22.54
100s/50s	4/24	1/9
Top score	164*	101
Balls bowled	148	0
Wickets	5	–
Bowling average	13.60	–
5 wickets in innings	0	–
10 wickets in match	0	–
Best bowling	2/5	–
Catches/stumpings	60/–	20/–
- Source: Cricinfo, 19 July 2013

Brian Ward (born 28 February 1944) is an English former cricketer. He played for Essex between 1967 and 1972. He later represented Argentina.

Ward played seven seasons for Essex, usually as an opening batsman. He made his highest score against Nottinghamshire in 1970, when he batted five and three-quarter hours for 164 not out and added an unbroken 208 for the third wicket with Keith Fletcher. His most successful season was 1971, when he scored 968 first-class runs at an average of 27.65. Wisden commented at the time that he had made a "notable advance" and "served the side well by patient methods". After the 1972 season, when he "was responsible for some stern but nevertheless helpful displays", he left first-class cricket.

Later Ward spent some time in Argentina, coaching and playing cricket. He represented the country at the inaugural ICC Trophy in England in 1979, but without personal or team success. He married an Argentine woman and moved to Uruguay.
