= Bill Bourne (cricketer) =

Barbadian cricketer (born 1952)

Personal information
- Full name: William Anderson Bourne
- Born: 15 November 1952 (age 73); Saint Michael, Barbados
- Batting: Right-handed
- Bowling: Right-arm fast-medium

Domestic team information
- Years: Team
- 1970–71: Barbados
- 1973 to 1977: Warwickshire

Career statistics
| Competition | First-class | List A |
|---|---|---|
| Matches | 60 | 68 |
| Runs scored | 1,325 | 337 |
| Batting average | 21.03 | 10.53 |
| 100s/50s | 1/5 | 0/0 |
| Top score | 107 | 34 |
| Balls bowled | 7,977 | 3,307 |
| Wickets | 128 | 83 |
| Bowling average | 32.53 | 27.84 |
| 5 wickets in innings | 2 | 0 |
| 10 wickets in match | 0 | 0 |
| Best bowling | 6/47 | 4/24 |
| Catches/stumpings | 39/– | 24/– |
- Source: CricketArchive

William Anderson Bourne (born 15 November 1952) is a Barbadian former first-class cricketer.

An opening bowler and lower-order batsman, Bourne was one of the leading bowlers for the West Indies youth team on their unbeaten tour of England in 1970. He played at first with Barbados and then with Warwickshire during the 1970s. After leaving Warwickshire he moved to Zambia, and represented East Africa in the 1982 ICC Trophy.

Bourne scored his only first-class century against Sussex in 1976, when he went to the wicket with the score at 174 for 7, and added 203 for the eighth wicket with Geoff Humpage. Four days earlier, he had taken his best first-class bowling figures of 6 for 47 against Cambridge University.
