= Geoff Robinson (cricketer) =

English cricketer (1944–2015)

Personal information
- Full name: Geoffrey Robinson
- Born: 13 January 1944; Bridlington, East Riding of Yorkshire, England
- Died: 10 June 2015 (aged 71); Grimsby, Lincolnshire, England
- Batting: Left-handed
- Bowling: Slow left-arm orthodox
- Role: Wicket-keeper

Domestic team information
- Years: Team
- 1976–1978: Minor Counties East
- 1972–1979: Minor Counties North
- 1971–1972: Minor Counties
- 1965–1986: Lincolnshire

Career statistics
| Competition | First-class | List A |
|---|---|---|
| Matches | 2 | 37 |
| Runs scored | 100 | 600 |
| Batting average | 25.00 | 17.14 |
| 100s/50s | –/– | 1/2 |
| Top score | 36 | 132 |
| Balls bowled | – | 99 |
| Wickets | – | 1 |
| Bowling average | – | 60.00 |
| 5 wickets in innings | – | – |
| 10 wickets in match | – | – |
| Best bowling | – | 1/46 |
| Catches/stumpings | –/– | 24/1 |
- Source: Cricinfo, 5 August 2011

Geoffrey Robinson (13 January 1944 – 10 June 2015) was an English cricketer. Robinson was a left-handed batsman who fielded as a wicket-keeper. When required, he could also bowl slow left-arm orthodox. The son of Geoffrey Robinson Sr., he was born in Bridlington, East Riding of Yorkshire.

His father had played Minor counties cricket for Lincolnshire, following in his fathers footsteps, Robinson made his debut for Lincolnshire against the Nottinghamshire Second XI in the 1965 Minor Counties Championship. He played Minor counties cricket for Lincolnshire from 1965 to 1986, making 193 Minor Counties Championship appearances and 5 MCCA Knockout Trophy. He made his List A debut against Hampshire in the 1966 Gillette Cup. He made 7 further List A appearances for Lincolnshire, the last of which came against Surrey in the 1983 NatWest Trophy. In his 8 List A matches for Lincolnshire, he scored 264 runs at an average of 33.00, with a high score of 132. This score, which was to be his only century in List A cricket, came against Northumberland in the 1971 Gillette Cup. Behind the stumps he took 8 catches in these matches.

He also played first-class cricket for the Minor Counties, making his debut against the touring Indians in 1971. In this match he opened the batting, scoring 35 in the Minor Counties first-innings, before being dismissed by Bhagwat Chandrasekhar. In their second-innings he was dismissed for 29 by Srinivasaraghavan Venkataraghavan. He made a further first-class appearance for the team against the touring Australians in 1972. Again opening the batting, Robinson was dismissed for a duck by Jeff Hammond in the first-innings, while in the second-innings he scored 36 runs before being dismissed by Ashley Mallett. He also played List A cricket for Minor Counties North, making his debut for the team against Nottinghamshire in the 1972 Benson & Hedges Cup. He made 17 further List A appearances for the team, the last of which came against Nottinghamshire in the 1979 Benson & Hedges Cup. In his 18 matches for the team, he scored 205 runs at an average of 12.81, with a high score of 51. This score, one of two fifties he made for the team, came against Nottinghamshire in the 1974 Benson & Hedges Cup. Behind the stumps he took 10 catches and made a single stumping for Minor Counties North. He additionally played List A cricket for Minor Counties East, who he made his debut for against Nottinghamshire in the 1976 Benson & Hedges Cup. He made 10 further appearances for Minor Counties East, the last of which came against Northamptonshire in the 1978 Benson & Hedges Cup. In his 11 matches for the team, he scored 131 runs at an average of 11.90, with a high score of 37, while behind the stumps he took 6 catches. A part-time slow left-arm bowler, Robinson also took a single wicket for Minor Counties East, which came at an overall cost of 56 runs, with best figures of 1/46.
