= Keith Jones (cricketer, born 1942) =

English cricketer (born 1942)

Personal information
- Full name: Keith Vaughan Jones
- Born: 28 March 1942 (age 84); Park Royal, Middlesex
- Batting: Right-handed
- Bowling: Right-arm medium

Domestic team information
- Years: Team
- 1967–1974: Middlesex
- 1975–1989: Bedfordshire

Career statistics
Competition	First-class	List A
Matches	118	114
Runs scored	2,064	900
Batting average	17.20	12.16
100s/50s	0/6	0/0
Top score	57*	38*
Balls bowled	14,981	5,250
Wickets	242	122
Bowling average	27.28	25.94
5 wickets in innings	7	1
10 wickets in match	0	0
Best bowling	7/52	6/28
Catches/stumpings	49/–	26/–
- Source: Cricinfo, 7 December 2011

Keith Vaughan Jones (born 28 March 1942) is a former English cricketer, who played over 100 matches in both first-class and List A cricket for Middlesex between 1967 and 1974. He was a right-handed batsman who bowled right-arm medium pace. He was born at Park Royal, Middlesex.
