= Ian Moore (cricketer) =

English cricketer

Personal information
- Full name: Harry Ian Moore
- Born: 28 February 1941; Sleaford, Lincolnshire, England
- Died: 16 February 2010 (aged 68)
- Batting: Right-handed
- Bowling: Right-arm medium

Domestic team information
- Years: Team
- 1973–1974: Minor Counties North
- 1973: Minor Counties
- 1970–1977: Lincolnshire
- 1962–1969: Nottinghamshire
- 1959: Lincolnshire

Career statistics
Competition	First-class	List A
Matches	177	24
Runs scored	6,765	321
Batting average	25.05	16.05
100s/50s	7/31	–/–
Top score	206*	31
Balls bowled	230	48
Wickets	5	1
Bowling average	28.80	38.00
5 wickets in innings	–	–
10 wickets in match	–	–
Best bowling	2/37	1/4
Catches/stumpings	107/–	5/–
- Source: Cricinfo, 22 October 2011

Harry Ian Moore (28 February 1941 – 16 February 2010) was an English cricketer. Moore was a right-handed batsman who bowled right-arm medium pace. He was born at Sleaford, Lincolnshire.

Moore played as a top and middle-order batsman for Nottinghamshire in first-class cricket from 1962 to 1969, and one match for Minor Counties in 1973. He amassed 6,765 runs in his first-class career at an average of 25.05. He passed 1000 runs in a season three times and hit seven centuries and 31 fifties. His highest score was 206 not out against the Indian tourists in 1967, made in 355 minutes.

He was not as successful in limited-overs cricket, although he captained the Lincolnshire side in the 1974 Gillette Cup, when they beat Glamorgan.

Moore began his career wearing glasses while batting, and later was one of the first professional cricketers to adopt contact lenses.
