= Arthur Sutton =

English cricketer

Personal information
- Full name: James Arthur Sutton
- Born: 26 June 1939 (age 87); Longsight, Lancashire, England
- Batting: Left-handed
- Bowling: Right-arm off break

Domestic team information
- Years: Team
- 1975: Minor Counties North
- 1969–1972: Minor Counties
- 1959–1987: Cheshire

Career statistics
Competition	First-class	List A
Matches	4	9
Runs scored	164	138
Batting average	20.50	17.25
100s/50s	–/1	–/1
Top score	57	54
Balls bowled	438	493
Wickets	4	6
Bowling average	49.25	36.66
5 wickets in innings	–	–
10 wickets in match	–	–
Best bowling	2/44	3/29
Catches/stumpings	2/–	2/–
- Source: Cricinfo, 9 April 2011

James Arthur Sutton (born 26 June 1939) is a former English cricketer. Sutton was a left-handed batsman who bowled right-arm off break. He was born in Longsight, Lancashire.

Sutton made his debut for Cheshire in the 1959 Minor Counties Championship against the Warwickshire Second XI. He played Minor counties cricket for Cheshire from 1959 to 1987, including 238 Minor Counties Championship matches. and 14 MCCA Knockout Trophy matches. In 1964, he made his List A debut for Cheshire against Surrey in the Gillette Cup. He made seven further List A appearances for Cheshire, with his final List A match coming against Surrey in the 1986 NatWest Trophy. In his eight List A matches for Cheshire, he scored 84 runs at a batting average of 12.00, with a high score of 18. With the ball he took 5 wickets at a bowling average of 38.60, with best figures of 3/29 which came against Norfolk in the 1968 Gillette Cup. Sutton served as the Cheshire captain from 1977 to 1986.

Playing for a Minor County, Sutton played a number of games for combined Minor Counties teams. It was for the Minor Counties cricket team that he made his first-class for against the touring West Indians. He played three further first-class matches for the team, the last coming in 1972 against the touring Australians. In those four matches, he scored 164 runs at a batting average of 20.50, with a single half century high score of 57 which came against the touring New Zealanders in 1969. With the ball he took 4 wickets at an average of 49.25, with best figures of 2/44. In the 1975 Benson & Hedges Cup, he played a single List A match for Minor Counties North against Lancashire, in which he scored 54 runs. He also took a single wicket in this match, that of Lancashire captain David Lloyd.

Sutton also played for the Lancashire Second XI in 1957.
