= Gwynne Jones =

Zimbabwean-born English cricketer

Personal information
- Full name: Gwynne Auld Jones
- Born: 23 April 1945 (age 81); Southern Rhodesia
- Batting: Right-handed
- Bowling: Right-arm fast-medium

Domestic team information
- Years: Team
- 1976: Minor Counties West
- 1975: Minor Counties South
- 1972–1979: Buckinghamshire

Career statistics
Competition	List A
Matches	7
Runs scored	96
Batting average	13.71
100s/50s	–/–
Top score	47
Balls bowled	234
Wickets	5
Bowling average	28.80
5 wickets in innings	–
10 wickets in match	–
Best bowling	2/30
Catches/stumpings	1/–
- Source: Cricinfo, 25 April 2011

Gwynne Auld Jones (born 23 April 1945) is a Zimbabwean born former English cricketer. Jones was a right-handed batsman who bowled right-arm fast-medium. He was born in Southern Rhodesia, which is today Zimbabwe.

Jones made his debut for Buckinghamshire in the 1972 Minor Counties Championship against Berkshire. Jones played Minor counties cricket for Buckinghamshire from 1972 to 1979, which included 59 Minor Counties Championship matches In 1972, he made his List A debut against Cambridgeshire in the Gillette Cup. He played three further List A matches for Buckinghamshire, the last coming against Suffolk in 1979. Jones also played List A cricket for Minor Counties South in the 1975 Benson & Hedges Cup against Middlesex and two matches for Minor Counties West in the 1976 Benson & Hedges Cup. In total, Jones played seven List A matches, scoring 96 runs at a batting average of 13.71, with a high score of 47. With the ball he took 5 wickets at a bowling average of 28.80, with best figures of 2/30.
