= David Turner (cricketer) =

English cricketer

Personal information
- Full name: David Roy Turner
- Born: 5 February 1949 (age 77); Corsham, Wiltshire, England
- Nickname: Birdy
- Height: 5 ft 6 in (1.68 m)
- Batting: Left-handed
- Bowling: Right-arm medium
- Role: Batsman

Domestic team information
- Years: Team
- 1966–1989: Hampshire
- 1977/78: Western Province
- FC debut: 20 August 1966 Hampshire v Kent
- Last FC: 11 July 1989 Hampshire v Northamptonshire
- LA debut: 25 May 1968 Hampshire v Bedfordshire
- Last LA: 7 May 1991 Minor Counties v Nottinghamshire

Career statistics
Competition	First-class	List A
Matches	426	381
Runs scored	19,005	9,904
Batting average	30.55	30.28
100s/50s	28/90	5/60
Top score	184*	123*
Balls bowled	626	17
Wickets	9	0
Bowling average	39.66	–
5 wickets in innings	0	–
10 wickets in match	0	–
Best bowling	2/7	–
Catches/stumpings	191/–	92/–
- Source: CricketArchive, 30 May 2010

David Roy Turner (born 5 February 1949) is a former English first-class cricketer who played for Hampshire County Cricket Club. He played 426 games between 1966 and 1989, making 19,005 runs at a batting average of 30.55 with 28 hundreds.

David Turner played for Hampshire in 24 consecutive seasons, which is the longest unbroken run in their history. He is also the only Hampshire cricketer to have been in sides that won the Championship, Sunday League and a Lord's Final. Hampshire were not the only county who sought to sign the promising young left-hander but he came to the county, making his first-class debut in August 1966, when just 17. He was not a regular member of the side in the early seasons, but in August 1969, scored 181* at the Oval, still Hampshire's highest maiden century in a Championship match. In the next two seasons, he passed 1,000 runs with more centuries, and in mid-May, 1972, he impressed the touring Australians, taking 131 off their attack, including Lillee, at Southampton. He was spoken of as a Test prospect, but a few weeks later at Basingstoke retired hurt with an eye injury from a short ball, which seemed to dent his confidence. He was nonetheless back in the side as an ever-present with 1,000 runs as Hampshire won the title in 1973 - from then until he retired in 1989, he continued to score runs in both formats and by the end he had passed 1,000 runs in nine seasons. In 1973, he also fielded as a substitute for England in the second Test against the West Indies at Birmingham, winning praise in Wisden, which reported that Turner "replaced Boycott and saved many runs".

With the covering of pitches in his later years, his average rose into the 40s, and to 49.18 in his 'Indian Summer' of 1987 – for Hampshire he finished with 18,683 first-class runs and 27 centuries. He scored almost 10,000 limited-overs runs for Hampshire, and fittingly was at the wicket with his captain Mark Nicholas when Hampshire won their first Lord's Final in 1988. He was also a very fine out-fielder with a fierce accurate throw, and while he was no bowler, in the 1960s, when the authorities briefly revived single-wicket competitions among county cricketers, he, rather than Hampshire's all-rounders or big-hitting bowlers, was the county's champion in 1967 & 1968. In addition, in 1981, he took a hat-trick in a limited-overs 'Lambert & Butler's' tournament. He retired to take over the family shoe business, back home in Wiltshire.

His highest score was 184 not out against Gloucestershire at Gloucester in 1987, when he and Gordon Greenidge put on 311 for the third wicket, and Hampshire won by an innings.
