= John Dale (cricketer, born 1930) =

English cricketer and school teacher

Personal information
- Full name: John Ronald Dale
- Born: 24 October 1930; Cleethorpes, Lincolnshire
- Died: 19 November 2016 (aged 86); Skegness, Lincolnshire
- Batting: Right-handed
- Bowling: Slow left-arm orthodox

Domestic team information
- Years: Team
- 1949–1979: Lincolnshire
- 1958–1959: Kent

Career statistics
Competition	First-class	List A
Matches	1	4
Runs scored	0	3
Batting average	0.00	3.00
100s/50s	0/0	0/0
Top score	0	2*
Balls bowled	96	270
Wickets	1	7
Bowling average	31.00	23.85
5 wickets in innings	0	0
10 wickets in match	0	0
Best bowling	1/31	3/33
Catches/stumpings	0/–	0/–
- Source: CricInfo, 12 July 2011

John Ronald Dale (24 October 1930 – 19 November 2016) was an English school teacher and cricketer. He was born in Cleethorpes in Lincolnshire in 1930 and played primarily for Lincolnshire County Cricket Club.

== Cricketing career ==
Dale made his debut for Lincolnshire County Cricket Club in the 1949 Minor Counties Championship against Derbyshire Second XI. He initially played for the county until 1952. He was a student at Durham University and played for the winning University cricket team in the final of the Universities Athletic Union Championship in 1953. He later appeared for Northamptonshire Second XI in the Minor Counties Championship in 1955 and 1956 but was unable to break into the First XI.

After making one Second XI appearance in 1957, Dale signed a two-year professional contract with Kent before the 1958 season. He ended the season as the leading wicket-taker for the Kent Second XI with 42 wickets and was awarded his Second XI cap. He made his only first-class cricket appearance during the season, playing against Cambridge University in May, taking the wicket of Ted Dexter, his only wicket in first-class cricket.

Following the season Dale resigned his position at Kent, opting to become a teacher instead, although he played twice for Kent's Second XI during the 1959 school holidays, taking 14 wickets. He made one appearance for Northamptonshire's Second XI in 1967 before playing regularly for Lincolnshire between 1970 and 1979 although his career limited his playing opportunities. Dale took a total of 151 wickets for Lincolnshire at an average of 20.08. He played three times for the county in the Gillette Cup, taking 3/33 against Glamorgan in 1974 as Lincolnshire became only the second minor county to defeat a first-class county in the competition. He also made one appearance for Minor Counties North in the 1974 Benson & Hedges Cup.

== Later life ==
Dale played club cricketer Skegness, playing league cricket into his 70s. He had a long and successful teaching career, teaching at a grammar school before becoming headteacher of Sir John Franklin Secondary Modern School in Spilsby. He died in Skegness on 19 November 2016 at the age of 86.
