= Don Wilson (cricketer) =

English cricketer & coach (1937–2012)

Personal information
- Full name: Donald Wilson
- Born: 7 August 1937; Settle, Yorkshire, England
- Died: 21 July 2012 (aged 74); York, Yorkshire, England
- Batting: Left-handed
- Bowling: Slow left-arm orthodox
- Role: Bowler

International information
- National side: England
- Test debut (cap 418): 10 January 1964 v India
- Last Test: 25 February 1971 v New Zealand

Career statistics
Competition	Test	FC	LA
Matches	6	422	65
Runs scored	75	6,230	501
Batting average	12.50	14.09	11.65
100s/50s	0/0	1/10	0/0
Top score	42	112	46
Balls bowled	1,472	69,672	2,821
Wickets	11	1,189	82
Bowling average	42.36	21.00	20.01
5 wickets in innings	0	50	2
10 wickets in match	0	8	0
Best bowling	2/17	8/36	6/18
Catches/stumpings	1/–	250/–	22/–
- Source: ESPNcricinfo, 24 April 2017

Donald Wilson (7 August 1937 – 21 July 2012) was an English cricketer, who played in six Test matches for England from 1964 to 1971. His first-class cricket career, which lasted from 1957 to 1974, was spent with Yorkshire County Cricket Club and he later became a noted cricket coach. He was born in Settle, Yorkshire and died at York.

== Life and career ==
Wilson made his first-class debut in 1957 but his regular cricket began two years later when he succeeded Johnny Wardle as Yorkshire's left-arm spinner, winning his Yorkshire cap in 1960. He was then an integral part of Yorkshire's formidable side that won seven County Championship titles between 1959 and 1968. He was tall and wiry, relying on bounce more than savage side spin, and took 100 wickets in a season five times, including three of the seven seasons he was part of the Championship-winning side. He also secured two hat-tricks in 1966.

Derek Underwood owned the left arm spinner's spot in the England side during Wilson's career, but he ventured abroad twice with the national team. He toured India in 1963–64, where he played all five Test matches, and to Australia and New Zealand in 1970–71, where he played against New Zealand, at the end of Ray Illingworth's successful Ashes campaign. He also played twice for England against the Rest of the World in 1970, after the cancellation of the South Africa tour. These were counted as full Test matches at the time, but were later stripped of their status.

Wilson retired from Yorkshire in 1974, disillusioned by Geoffrey Boycott's captaincy, and took up the role as the MCC's chief coach at Lord's, a position he held until 1991. He then continued his lifelong involvement in the game by returning to Yorkshire, as coach at Ampleforth College.

Wilson also played Bradford League Cricket for Manningham Mills In season 1979, along with Phil Sharpe, winning the Priestley Cup.
