= Arthur Robinson (cricketer, born 1946) =

English cricketer

Arthur Leslie Robinson (17 August 1946 – 11 February 2024) was an English first-class cricketer, who played 84 first-class matches for Yorkshire County Cricket Club between 1971 and 1977. He also played in 92 List A one day matches.

Born in Brompton, Northallerton, Robinson was a left arm fast medium bowler who took 196 wickets at an average of 25.13, with best figures of 6 for 61 against Surrey. He took five wickets in an innings seven times. A left-handed tail end batsman, he scored 365 runs at 9.60, with a best of 30 not out against Glamorgan. Robinson took 48 catches in the field.

Robinson took 105 wickets in one day cricket at 24.64, with a best of 4 for 25 against Surrey. He scored 128 runs at 7.52, with a highest of 18 not out against Lancashire and he took 15 catches.

Robinson died on 11 February 2024 at the age of 77.
