= 1971 John Player League =

- Administrator(s): Test and County Cricket Board
- Cricket format: Limited overs cricket (40 overs per innings)
- Tournament format(s): League
- Champions: Worcestershire (1st title)
- Participants: 17
- Matches: 136
- Most runs: 650 Michael Buss (Sussex)
- Most wickets: 33 Keith Boyce (Essex)/Lawrence Williams (Glamorgan)

The 1971 John Player League was the third competing of what was generally known as the Sunday League. The competition was won for the first time by Worcestershire County Cricket Club.

== Standings ==
Team	Pld	W	T	L	N/R	A	Pts	R/R
Worcestershire	16	11	0	5	0	0	44	4.522
Essex	16	11	0	5	0	0	44	4.519
Lancashire	16	10	0	6	0	0	40	4.575
Leicestershire	16	10	0	6	0	0	40	4.335
Somerset	16	9	0	5	1	1	38	4.436
Hampshire	16	9	0	7	0	0	36	4.366
Sussex	16	8	0	8	0	0	32	4.704
Kent	16	8	0	8	0	0	32	4.435
Surrey	16	8	0	8	0	0	32	4.056
Glamorgan	16	7	0	7	2	0	30	4.287
Derbyshire	16	7	0	8	1	0	29	4.111
Nottinghamshire	16	6	0	9	0	1	25	4.365
Middlesex	16	6	0	10	0	0	24	4.721
Northamptonshire	16	6	0	10	0	0	24	4.137
Yorkshire	16	5	0	9	0	2	22	4.347
Gloucestershire	16	5	0	9	0	2	22	4.052
Warwickshire	16	5	0	11	0	0	20	4.695
Team marked (C) finished as champions. Source: CricketArchive

== Batting averages ==
Player	County	Matches	Innings	Runs	Average	Highest Score	100s	50s
Gordon Barker	Essex	12	11	449	56.12	87*	0	4
Ron Headley	Worcestershire	16	16	554	55.40	73*	0	5
Garry Sobers	Nottinghamshire	14	14	587	53.36	116*	1	4
Geoffrey Boycott	Yorkshire	9	9	443	49.22	93	0	5
Brian Close	Somerset	15	14	461	46.10	89*	0	3
Michael Buss	Sussex	16	16	650	40.62	121	1	3
Ian Buxton	Derbyshire	16	16	400	36.36	71*	0	2
John Shepherd	Kent	16	15	415	34.58	65	0	3
Qualification: 400 runs. Source: CricketArchive

== Bowling averages ==
Player	County	Balls	Wickets	Average	Economy	BBI	4wi	5wi
Derek Underwood	Kent	529	24	12.00	3.26	4/25	3	0
Vanburn Holder	Worcestershire	697	32	12.18	3.35	4/17	2	0
Lawrence Williams	Glamorgan	561	33	12.39	4.37	5/31	2	1
Keith Boyce	Essex	730	33	12.69	3.44	8/26	2	1
Peter Sainsbury	Hampshire	618	24	15.16	3.53	4/34	1	0
David Hughes	Lancashire	636	24	15.58	3.52	4/29	1	0
John Shepherd	Kent	723	26	17.07	3.68	4/20	2	0
Stuart Turner	Essex	627	24	17.58	4.03	4/29	2	0
Tony Greig	Sussex	680	28	17.71	4.37	6/28	0	1
Terry Spencer	Leicestershire	678	24	19.50	4.14	4/21	2	0
Qualification: 24 wickets. Source: CricketArchive

== See also ==
- Sunday League
