= 1972 Benson & Hedges Cup =

- Administrator: Test and County Cricket Board
- Cricket format: Limited overs cricket (55 overs per innings)
- Champions: Leicestershire (1st title)
- Participants: 20
- Matches: 47
- Most runs: 284 Mike Proctor (Gloucestershire)
- Most wickets: 18 Garth McKenzie (Leicestershire)

The 1972 Benson & Hedges Cup was the first edition of cricket's Benson & Hedges Cup. The competition was won by Leicestershire County Cricket Club.

== Fixtures and results ==
=== Group stage ===
==== Midlands Group ====
Team	Pld	W	L	BP	Pts	BowSR
Leicestershire	4	4	0	4	16	30.125
Warwickshire	4	3	1	1	10	45.276
Worcestershire	4	2	2	1	7	45.071
Northamptonshire	4	1	3	0	3	66.278
Cambridge University	4	0	4	0	0	77.786

==== Northern Group ====
Team	Pld	W	L	BP	Pts	BowSR
Yorkshire	4	3	1	2	11	34.750
Lancashire	4	3	1	2	11	39.138
Nottinghamshire	4	3	1	1	10	45.276
Derbyshire	4	1	3	0	3	44.786
Minor Counties North	4	0	4	0	0	55.000

==== Southern Group ====
Team	Pld	W	L	BP	Pts	BowSR
Sussex	4	3	1	1	10	34.917
Middlesex	4	3	1	1	10	47.000
Kent	4	2	2	2	8	37.235
Surrey	4	2	2	1	7	37.429
Essex	4	0	4	0	0	43.833

==== Western Group ====
Team	Pld	W	L	BP	Pts	BowSR
Glamorgan	4	3	1	2	11	40.800
Gloucestershire	4	3	1	1	10	33.703
Somerset	4	2	2	2	8	34.270
Hampshire	4	2	2	1	7	34.882
Minor Counties South	4	0	4	0	0	43.321

=== Quarter-finals ===
14 June 1972
(scorecard)

Glamorgan; 104/9 (55 overs)	v	Warwickshire; 108/5 (45.5 overs)
Peter Walker 22; Lance Gibbs 2/5 (11 overs)		Deryck Murray 28 * Don Shepherd 2/22 (11 overs)

Warwickshire won by 5 wickets
Sophia Gardens, Cardiff
Umpires: Ray Julian & Alan Whitehead
Player of the match: Deryck Murray (Warwickshire)

14 June 1972
(scorecard)

Lancashire; 135 all out (55 overs)	v	Leicestershire; 138/3 (49.4 overs)
Barry Wood 29; Ray Illingworth 3/30 (10 overs)		Barry Dudleston 65 * Barry Wood 2/39 (11 overs)

Leicestershire won by 7 wickets
Grace Road, Leicester
Umpires: Sam Cook & George Pope
Player of the match: Barry Dudleston (Leicestershire)

14 June 1972
(scorecard)

Gloucestershire; 238/9 (55 overs)	v	Middlesex; 176 all out (49.5 overs)
Roger Knight 92; Mike Selvey 5/39 (11 overs)		Clive Radley 63; Tony Brown 4/43 (11 overs)

Gloucestershire won by 62 runs
Lord's, London
Umpires: John Arnold & John Langridge
Player of the match: Roger Knight (Gloucestershire)

14, 15 June 1972
(scorecard)

Sussex; 85 all out (51.1 overs)	v	Yorkshire; 89/5 (51 overs)
Roger Prideaux 25; Don Wilson 3/18 (11 overs)		Geoffrey Boycott 24; Tony Greig 3/15 (11 overs)

Yorkshire won by 5 wickets
Park Avenue Cricket Ground, Bradford
Umpires: Eddie Phillipson & Dusty Rhodes
Player of the match: Don Wilson (Yorkshire)

- Reserve day used. Yorkshire were 19/2 (12.3 overs) at the close of the scheduled day’s play

=== Semi-finals ===
28 June 1972
(scorecard)

Warwickshire; 96 all out (39.5 overs)	v	Leicestershire; 98/3 (37.2 overs)
Norman McVicker 23; Garth McKenzie 3/19 (11 overs)		Barry Dudleston 30; Lance Gibbs 3/18 (11 overs)

Leicestershire won by 7 wickets
Grace Road, Leicester
Umpires: Jack Crapp & John Langridge
Player of the match: Ray Illingworth (Leicestershire)

28 June 1972
(scorecard)

Gloucestershire; 131 all out (55 overs)	v	Yorkshire; 134/3 (48.4 overs)
David Shepherd 40; Chris Old 3/13 (11 overs)		Geoffrey Boycott 75 * Tony Brown 2/16 (11 overs)

Yorkshire won by 7 wickets
Headingley, Leeds
Umpires: Charlie Elliott & Peter Wight
Player of the match: Geoffrey Boycott (Yorkshire)

=== Final ===
22 July 1972
(scorecard)

Yorkshire; 136/9 (55 overs)	v	Leicestershire; 140/5 (46.5 overs)
Barrie Leadbeater 32; Garth McKenzie 3/22 (11 overs)		Chris Balderstone 41 * Howard Cooper 2/27 (9 overs)

Leicestershire won by 7 wickets
Lord's, London
Umpires: David Constant & Tom Spencer
Player of the match: Chris Balderstone (Leicestershire)

== See also ==
- Benson & Hedges Cup
