= Lincolnshire County Cricket Club =

English county cricket club

Team information
- Founded: 1906
- Home ground: No fixed location

History
- MCCC wins: 2
- MCCAT wins: 0
- FP Trophy wins: 0
- Official website: Lincolnshire County Cricket Club

Lincolnshire County Cricket Club is one of twenty minor county clubs within the domestic cricket structure of England and Wales. It represents the historic county of Lincolnshire.

The team is currently a member of the Minor Counties Championship Eastern Division and plays in the MCCA Knockout Trophy. Lincolnshire played List A matches occasionally from 1966 until 2004 but is not classified as a List A team per se.

The club is based at Lincoln and plays matches around the county at Lincoln, Bourne, Grantham, London Road, Sleaford and Cleethorpes.

== Honours ==
- Minor Counties Championship (2) – 1966, 2003; shared (1) – 2001
- MCCA Knockout Trophy (0) –

== Earliest cricket ==
Cricket probably reached Lincolnshire in the 18th century. The earliest reference to cricket in the county is dated 1792.

== Origin of club ==
A county organisation was set up in 1853. Grantham's mayor, Arthur Priestley was a prime mover in the development of Lincolnshire cricket, although he played for Nottinghamshire as an amateur. In 1896, he captained an English side in the West Indies. When the Gentlemen of Philadelphia toured England in 1903, they played a Lincolnshire XVI in Grantham with Bart King scoring 176 runs.

The present Lincolnshire CCC was founded on 28 September 1906. It competed in the Minor Counties Championship from 1907 to 1914 and then again from 1924.

== Club history ==
Lincolnshire has won the Minor Counties Championship twice, and also once shared the title. It won the title outright in 1966 and 2003. It shared the accolade in 2001 with Cheshire.

== Knockout Trophy ==
Lincolnshire has never won the MCCA Knockout Trophy since its inception in 1983.

== Notable players ==
The following Lincolnshire cricketers also made an impact on the first-class game:

- Arthur Priestley MP
- Sonny Ramadhin
- Duncan Fearnley
- Somachandra de Silva
- Ivan Madray
- Norman McVicker
- Ian Moore
- Phil Neale - Worcestershire CCC and England cricket coach
- Arnold Rylott, known as Bobby.
- Geoff Cope
- Azeem Rafiq
- Mathew Dowman - Notts CCC and England u23
