= List of Suffolk County Cricket Club List A players =

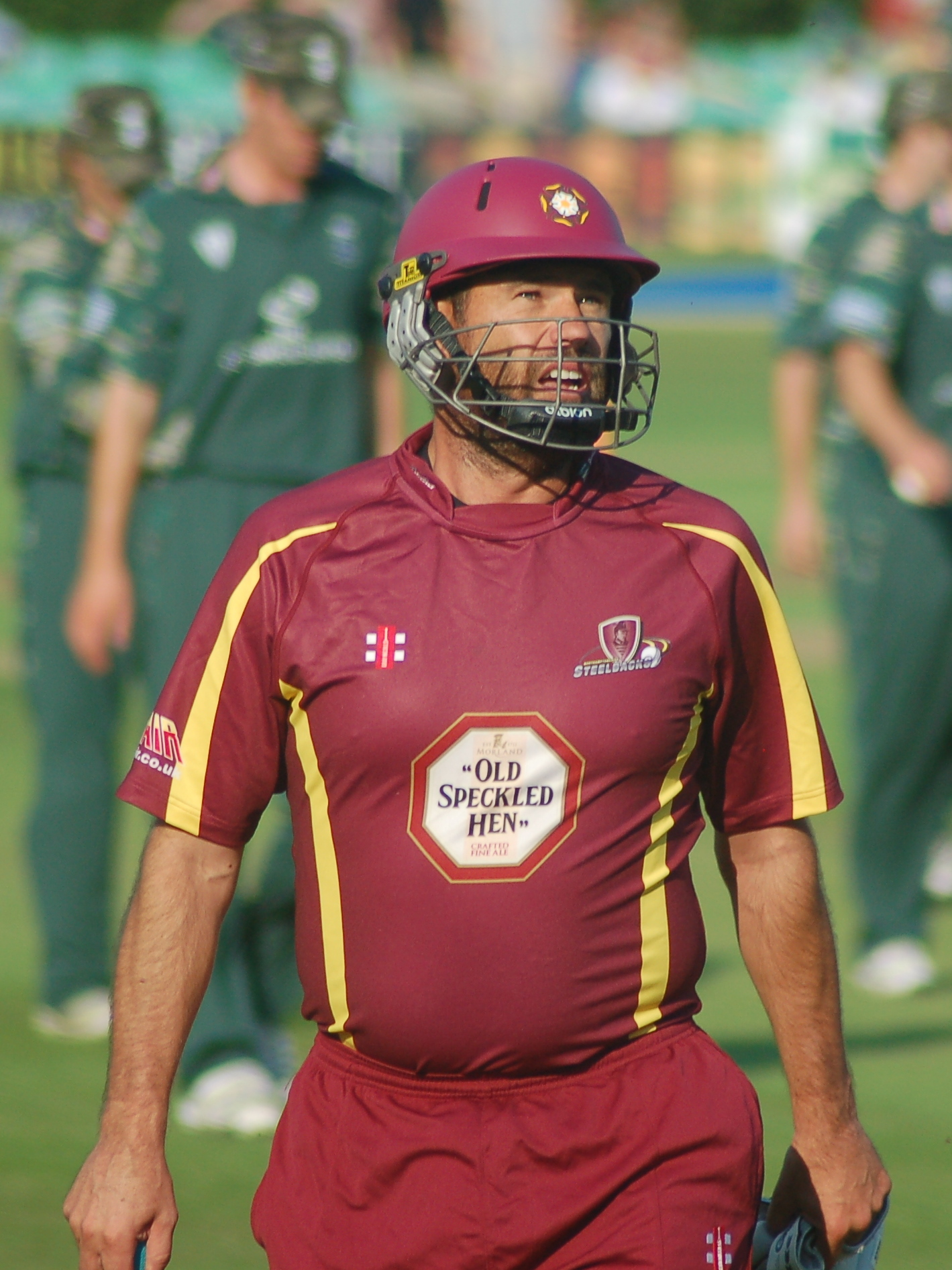
Andrew Hall played one match for Suffolk in 2002, scoring 16 runs and taking 4 wickets

Suffolk County Cricket Club, in its current form, was formed in 1932. The county first competed in the Minor Counties Championship between 1904 and 1914. It then appeared again from 1934 and has been competing continuously since. It has appeared in twenty-eight List A matches, making five Gillette Cup, fourteen NatWest Trophy and nine Cheltenham & Gloucester Trophy appearances. The players in this list have all played at least one List A match. Suffolk cricketers who have not represented the county in List A cricket are excluded from the list.

Players are listed in order of appearance, where players made their debut in the same match, they are ordered by batting order. Players in bold have played first-class cricket.

== Key ==
**General**

- ♠ – Captain
- † – Wicket-keeper
- **First** – Year of debut for Suffolk
- **Last** – Year of latest match played for Suffolk
- **Mat** – Number of matches played for Suffolk
- **Win%** – Winning percentage

**Batting**

- **Inn** – Number of innings batted
- **NO** – Number of innings not out
- **Runs** – Runs scored in career
- **HS** – Highest score
- **100** – Centuries scored
- **50** – Half-centuries scored
- **Avg** – Runs scored per dismissal
- * – Batsman remained not out

**Bowling**

- **Balls** – Balls bowled in career
- **Wkt** – Wickets taken in career
- **BBI** – Best bowling in an innings
- **BBM** – Best bowling in a match
- **Ave** – Average runs per wicket

**Fielding**

- **Ca** – Catches taken
- **St** – Stumpings effected

== List of players ==
| No. | Name | Nationality | First | Last | Mat | Runs | HS | Avg | Balls | Wkt | BBI | Ave | Ca | St |
| No. | Name | Nationality | First | Last | Mat | Batting | | | Bowling | | | | Fielding | |
|---|---|---|---|---|---|---|---|---|---|---|---|---|---|---|
| 1 | **Ian Prior** ♠† | England | 1966 | 1966 | 1 | 41 | 41 | 41.00 | 0 | 0 | – | – | 1 | 0 |
| 2 | Robert Flack | England | 1966 | 1966 | 1 | 46 | 46 | 46.00 | 0 | 0 | – | – | 0 | 0 |
| 3 | Clifford Cunnell | England | 1966 | 1966 | 1 | 3 | 3 | 3.00 | 0 | 0 | – | – | 1 | 0 |
| 4 | Michael Scrutton | England | 1966 | 1966 | 1 | 14 | 14 | 14.00 | 72 | 1 | 1/45 | 45.00 | 0 | 0 |
| 5 | Bob Cunnell♠ | England | 1966 | 1979 | 4 | 55 | 40 | 18.33 | 18 | 1 | 1/28 | 28.00 | 1 | 0 |
| 6 | John Cadman | England | 1966 | 1966 | 1 | 7 | 7 | 7.00 | 24 | 0 | – | – | 0 | 0 |
| 7 | J.E. Green | England | 1966 | 1966 | 1 | 13 | 13* | – | 0 | 0 | – | – | 0 | 0 |
| 8 | Richard English | England | 1966 | 1966 | 1 | 0 | 0 | 0.00 | 42 | 1 | 1/59 | 59.00 | 1 | 0 |
| 9 | John Hargreaves | England | 1966 | 1966 | 1 | 2 | 2 | 2.00 | 66 | 2 | 2/44 | 22.00 | 0 | 0 |
| 10 | Colin Rutterford ♠ | England | 1966 | 1984 | 8 | 57 | 22* | 28.50 | 486 | 7 | 3/14 | 29.28 | 0 | 0 |
| 11 | **Cyril Perkins** | England | 1966 | 1966 | 1 | 0 | – | – | 72 | 0 | – | – | 0 | 0 |
| 12 | **Tony Warrington** | England | 1978 | 1981 | 5 | 44 | 18 | 8.80 | 0 | 0 | – | – | 2 | 0 |
| 13 | John Stuck | England | 1978 | 1978 | 1 | 0 | – | – | 0 | 0 | – | – | 0 | 0 |
| 14 | **Peter Jones** ♠ | England | 1978 | 1981 | 4 | 39 | 16 | 9.75 | 192 | 1 | 1/22 | 91.00 | 2 | 0 |
| 15 | **Simon Clements** ♠ | England | 1978 | 1996 | 13 | 169 | 59 | 13.00 | 228 | 5 | 3/30 | 29.00 | 1 | 0 |
| 16 | Roger Howlett | England | 1978 | 1984 | 5 | 71 | 35* | 17.75 | 18 | 0 | – | – | 1 | 0 |
| 17 | **Stuart Westley** † | England | 1978 | 1983 | 6 | 96 | 28 | 19.20 | 0 | 0 | – | – | 11 | 0 |
| 18 | **Robin Hobbs** | England | 1978 | 1978 | 1 | 4 | 4 | 4.00 | 54 | 1 | 1/18 | 18.00 | 0 | 0 |
| 19 | Richard Robinson | England | 1978 | 1989 | 8 | 95 | 40* | 15.83 | 432 | 8 | 3/59 | 35.75 | 3 | 0 |
| 20 | Hercules Grant | Canada | 1978 | 1978 | 1 | 15 | 15 | 15.00 | 72 | 1 | 1/41 | 41.00 | 0 | 0 |
| 21 | Paul Rice | England | 1979 | 1981 | 4 | 62 | 45 | 15.50 | 0 | 0 | – | – | 0 | 0 |
| 22 | **Timur Mohamed** | Guyana | 1979 | 1980 | 3 | 108 | 85 | 36.00 | 0 | 0 | – | – | 0 | 0 |
| 23 | Stephen Long | England | 1979 | 1979 | 2 | 12 | 7 | 6.00 | 0 | 0 | – | – | 0 | 0 |
| 24 | **Richard Done** | Australia | 1979 | 1980 | 3 | 57 | 53 | 19.00 | 210 | 6 | 3/9 | 15.83 | 0 | 0 |
| 25 | **Keith Bishop** | England | 1979 | 1980 | 2 | 3 | 3* | – | 72 | 1 | 1/27 | 27.00 | 0 | 0 |
| 26 | Brian Mayes | England | 1980 | 1980 | 1 | 13 | 13* | – | 6 | 0 | – | – | 0 | 0 |
| 27 | **Michael Maranta** | Australia | 1981 | 1981 | 1 | 12 | 12 | 12.00 | 72 | 2 | 2/40 | 20.00 | 0 | 0 |
| 28 | **David Barker** | England | 1981 | 1988 | 5 | 35 | 14 | 7.00 | 0 | 0 | – | – | 1 | 0 |
| 29 | Justin Edrich | England | 1983 | 1990 | 5 | 101 | 52 | 20.20 | 2 | 0 | – | – | 1 | 0 |
| 30 | Philip Caley ♠ | England | 1983 | 2005 | 22 | 514 | 88* | 32.12 | 558 | 6 | 2/24 | 84.66 | 7 | 0 |
| 31 | Dick Bond | England | 1983 | 1983 | 1 | 27 | 27 | 27.00 | 0 | 0 | – | – | 0 | 0 |
| 32 | **Russell Green** | England | 1983 | 1990 | 7 | 29 | 8* | 7.25 | 426 | 6 | 3/44 | 39.16 | 1 | 0 |
| 33 | Colin Graham | England | 1983 | 1985 | 3 | 1 | 1 | 1.00 | 187 | 3 | 2/36 | 42.00 | 1 | 0 |
| 34 | Gordon Morgan | England | 1984 | 1988 | 5 | 51 | 40 | 10.20 | 0 | 0 | – | – | 1 | 0 |
| 35 | **Reuben Herbert** | England | 1984 | 1986 | 3 | 26 | 17 | 8.66 | 156 | 1 | 1/37 | 82.00 | 0 | 0 |
| 36 | **Simon Ferguson** | England | 1984 | 1984 | 1 | 12 | 12 | 12.00 | 0 | 0 | – | – | 0 | 0 |
| 37 | **Peter Rawson** | Zimbabwe | 1984 | 1984 | 1 | 28 | 28 | 28.00 | 72 | 1 | 1/26 | 26.00 | 0 | 0 |
| 38 | **Adrian Brown** † | England | 1984 | 1999 | 8 | 67 | 51 | 9.57 | 0 | 0 | – | – | 5 | 2 |
| 39 | **Michael McEvoy** | England | 1985 | 1990 | 6 | 218 | 61 | 36.33 | 0 | 0 | – | – | 0 | 0 |
| 40 | Hedley Wright | England | 1985 | 1989 | 4 | 38 | 16 | 12.66 | 180 | 4 | 3/29 | 31.75 | 3 | 0 |
| 41 | **Kevin Brooks** | England | 1986 | 1987 | 2 | 35 | 26* | 35.00 | 0 | 0 | – | – | 0 | 0 |
| 42 | Mark Bailey ♠ | England | 1986 | 1990 | 5 | 6 | 4 | 2.00 | 253 | 4 | 3/42 | 37.00 | 0 | 0 |
| 43 | Richard Pybus | England | 1986 | 1986 | 1 | 4 | 4 | 4.00 | 24 | 0 | – | – | 0 | 0 |
| 44 | Michael Sturgeon † | England | 1986 | 1986 | 1 | 0 | – | – | 0 | 0 | – | – | 0 | 0 |
| 45 | Simon Halliday † | England | 1987 | 1995 | 5 | 18 | 13 | 3.60 | 0 | 0 | – | – | 1 | 1 |
| 46 | **Chris Gladwin** | England | 1988 | 1990 | 2 | 19 | 14 | 7.50 | 78 | 3 | 3/64 | 23.33 | 1 | 0 |
| 47 | Michael Peck | England | 1990 | 1995 | 2 | 49 | 49 | 24.50 | 0 | 0 | – | – | 1 | 0 |
| 48 | Ian Graham | England | 1990 | 2001 | 11 | 122 | 48 | 11.09 | 536 | 18 | 4/17 | 22.05 | 2 | 0 |
| 49 | **Andrew Golding** | England | 1990 | 1996 | 8 | 57 | 31* | 9.50 | 471 | 6 | 2/15 | 48.66 | 2 | 0 |
| 50 | **Keith Butler** | England | 1993 | 1993 | 1 | 17 | 17 | 17.00 | 0 | 0 | – | – | 1 | 0 |
| 51 | Andrew Squire | England | 1993 | 2001 | 4 | 46 | 29 | 11.50 | 0 | 0 | – | – | 1 | 0 |
| 52 | Craig Miller | England | 1993 | 1996 | 3 | 13 | 7 | 6.50 | 216 | 6 | 2/61 | 33.16 | 1 | 0 |
| 53 | **Ray East** ♠ | England | 1993 | 1993 | 1 | 13 | 13 | 13.00 | 72 | 0 | – | – | 3 | 0 |
| 54 | Paul Douglas | England | 1993 | 1993 | 1 | 2 | 2 | 2.00 | 72 | 0 | – | – | 0 | 0 |
| 55 | John Clinch | England | 1995 | 1995 | 1 | 18 | 18 | 18.00 | 0 | 0 | – | – | 1 | 0 |
| 56 | Robert Gofton | England | 1995 | 1995 | 1 | 6 | 6 | 6.00 | 42 | 0 | – | – | 0 | 0 |
| 57 | Darrell Carter | England | 1995 | 1995 | 1 | 3 | 3* | – | 72 | 3 | 3/31 | 10.33 | 1 | 0 |
| 58 | **Derek Randall** | England | 1996 | 2000 | 2 | 43 | 39 | 21.50 | 0 | 0 | – | – | 1 | 0 |
| 59 | Glucka Wijesuriya | England | 1996 | 1999 | 2 | 171 | 109* | 171.00 | 30 | 0 | – | – | 0 | 0 |
| 60 | Russell Catley | England | 1996 | 2003 | 9 | 152 | 65 | 16.88 | 0 | 0 | – | – | 2 | 0 |
| 61 | Simon Steel | England | 1996 | 1996 | 1 | 0 | – | – | 60 | 1 | 1/62 | 62.00 | 0 | 0 |
| 62 | **Adam Seymour** | England | 1999 | 2000 | 2 | 31 | 22 | 15.50 | 376 | 7 | 3/28 | 35.28 | 0 | 0 |
| 63 | **Dave Callaghan** | South Africa | 1999 | 2001 | 7 | 197 | 59 | 28.14 | 42 | 0 | – | – | 2 | 0 |
| 64 | Chris Seal | England | 1999 | 2001 | 7 | 100 | 41 | 25.00 | 86 | 2 | 1/6 | 39.50 | 1 | 0 |
| 65 | Aidan Baker | England | 1999 | 1999 | 1 | 1 | 1* | – | 37 | 0 | – | – | 0 | 0 |
| 66 | Gary Kirk | England | 1999 | 2000 | 9 | 4 | 3* | 4.00 | 528 | 14 | 3/16 | 21.42 | 0 | 0 |
| 67 | **Justin Bishop** | England | 2000 | 2000 | 1 | 0 | 0 | 0.00 | 42 | 1 | 1/17 | 17.00 | 0 | 0 |
| 68 | Daniel Rock † | England | 2000 | 2000 | 1 | 7 | 7 | 7.00 | 0 | 0 | – | – | 0 | 0 |
| 69 | Paul King | England | 2000 | 2005 | 4 | 31 | 15* | 15.50 | 120 | 2 | 1/40 | 68.00 | 2 | 0 |
| 70 | **Andrew Brown** | England | 2001 | 2002 | 7 | 95 | 44* | 15.83 | 0 | 0 | – | – | 3 | 0 |
| 71 | **Bill Athey** | England | 2001 | 2002 | 5 | 122 | 71 | 30.50 | 0 | 0 | – | – | 1 | 0 |
| 72 | **Christopher Warn** † | England | 2001 | 2005 | 7 | 136 | 52* | 34.00 | 0 | 0 | – | – | 11 | 2 |
| 73 | Matthew Catley | England | 2001 | 2002 | 3 | 15 | 9 | 7.50 | 0 | 0 | – | – | 1 | 0 |
| 74 | Kevin Shaw | England | 2001 | 2002 | 3 | 34 | 34* | 34.00 | 66 | 3 | 2/79 | 27.33 | 2 | 0 |
| 75 | Richard Pineo | England | 2001 | 2002 | 6 | 18 | 11* | 18.00 | 264 | 7 | 3/38 | 25.14 | 1 | 0 |
| 76 | Andrew Poole | England | 2001 | 2001 | 2 | 0 | 0 | 0.00 | 47 | 2 | 1/13 | 13.50 | 1 | 0 |
| 77 | Andrew Burch | England | 2001 | 2001 | 1 | 0 | – | – | 0 | 0 | – | – | 2 | 0 |
| 78 | Chris Swallow | England | 2001 | 2005 | 6 | 49 | 29* | 16.33 | 144 | 1 | 1/62 | 167.00 | 1 | 0 |
| 79 | **Andrew Hall** | South Africa | 2002 | 2002 | 1 | 16 | 16 | 16.00 | 60 | 4 | 4/33 | 8.25 | 1 | 0 |
| 80 | **Trevor Smith** | England | 2002 | 2005 | 4 | 55 | 37 | 13.75 | 204 | 4 | 2/37 | 44.25 | 1 | 0 |
| 81 | Andrew Mawson † | England | 2002 | 2005 | 3 | 67 | 65 | 22.33 | 0 | 0 | – | – | 0 | 0 |
| 82 | Ian Morton | England | 2002 | 2005 | 3 | 98 | 42* | 49.00 | 54 | 0 | – | – | 2 | 0 |
| 83 | **Martin van Jaarsveld** | South Africa | 2003 | 2003 | 1 | 21 | 21 | 21.00 | 60 | 0 | – | – | 3 | 0 |
| 84 | **Pierre Joubert** | South Africa | 2003 | 2003 | 1 | 46 | 46 | 46.00 | 60 | 4 | 4/82 | 20.50 | 0 | 0 |
| 85 | **Ben France** | England | 2003 | 2003 | 1 | 8 | 8 | 8.00 | 0 | 0 | – | – | 0 | 0 |
| 86 | **Doug Watson** | South Africa | 2005 | 2005 | 1 | 6 | 6 | 6.00 | 0 | 0 | – | – | 1 | 0 |
| 87 | **Lou Vincent** | New Zealand | 2005 | 2005 | 1 | 0 | 0 | 0.00 | 42 | 0 | – | – | 0 | 0 |
| 88 | **Andrew McGarry** | England | 2005 | 2005 | 1 | 0 | – | – | 60 | 1 | 1/63 | 63.00 | 1 | 0 |

== List A captains ==
| No. | Name | First | Last | Mat | Won | Lost | Tied | Win% |
|---|---|---|---|---|---|---|---|---|
| 1 | Ian Prior | 1966 | 1966 | 1 | 0 | 1 | 0 | 0% |
| 2 | Bob Cunnell | 1978 | 1979 | 3 | 1 | 2 | 0 | 33.33% |
| 3 | Peter Jones | 1980 | 1981 | 2 | 0 | 2 | 0 | 0% |
| 4 | Colin Rutterford | 1983 | 1984 | 2 | 0 | 2 | 0 | 0% |
| 5 | Simon Clements | 1985 | 1987 | 3 | 0 | 3 | 0 | 0% |
| 6 | Mark Bailey | 1988 | 1990 | 3 | 0 | 3 | 0 | 0% |
| 7 | Ray East | 1993 | 1993 | 1 | 0 | 1 | 0 | 0% |
| 8 | Philip Caley | 1995 | 2005 | 13 | 4 | 9 | 0 | 30.00% |
| **Total** | | 1966 | 2005 | **28** | **5** | **23** | **0** | **18.00%** |
