= 1983 NatWest Trophy =

- Administrator: Test and County Cricket Board
- Cricket format: Limited overs cricket (60 overs per innings)
- Tournament format: Knockout
- Champions: Somerset (2nd title)
- Participants: 32
- Matches: 30
- Most runs: 279 Chris Tavaré (Kent)
- Most wickets: 14 Joel Garner (Somerset)

The 1983 NatWest Trophy was an English limited overs county cricket tournament which was held between 29 June and 3 September 1983. The third NatWest Trophy competition, it was won by Somerset who defeated Kent by 24 runs in the final at Lord's.

== Format ==
The seventeen first-class counties were joined by thirteen Minor Counties. This was a change from the previous versions of the competition, where only five Minor Counties were permitted to take part. The Minor Counties taking part were: Berkshire, Cambridgeshire, Cheshire, Devon, Dorset, Durham, Hertfordshire, Lincolnshire, Norfolk, Oxfordshire, Shropshire, Suffolk and Wiltshire. The Ireland team also participated, along with Scotland national cricket team for the first time. Teams who won in the first round progressed to the second round. The winners in the second round then progressed to the quarter-final stage. Winners from the quarter-finals then progressed to the semi-finals from which the winners then went on to the final at Lord's which was held on 3 September 1983.

=== First round ===
29 June 1983
(scorecard)

Berkshire; 128/9 (60 overs)	v	Yorkshire; 131/3 (50.4 overs)
Graham Roope 29; Graham Stevenson 5/27 (12 overs)		Geoffrey Boycott 48; Martin Lickley 1/15 (5 overs)

Yorkshire won by 3 wickets
Church Road, Reading
Umpires: Ray Julian & Peter Stevens
Player of the match: Graham Stevenson (Yorkshire)

29 June 1983
(scorecard)

Cambridgeshire; 172 all out (58.4 overs)	v	Middlesex; 174/2 (51 overs)
Nigel Gadsby 63; John Emburey 2/27 (12 overs)		Keith Tomlins 80; Gary Rice 1/31 (12 overs)

Middlesex won by 8 wickets
Wisbech Cricket Club Ground, Wisbech
Umpires: Barrie Leadbeater & Jeremy Morley
Player of the match: Nigel Gadsby (Cambridgeshire)

29 June 1983
(scorecard)

Dorset; 111 all out (59.4 overs)	v	Essex; 117/3 (43.2 overs)
Michael Wagstaffe 34*; Neil Foster 3/19 (12 overs)		Ken McEwan 73*; Derek Hayward 3/15 (12 overs)

Essex won by 7 wickets
Dean Park, Bournemouth
Umpires: Lloyd Budd & John Harris
Player of the match: Ken McEwan (Essex)

29 June 1983
(scorecard)

Lancashire; 211/8 (60 overs)	v	Durham; 105 all out (46.3 overs)
David Hughes 71 (123); Simon Davis 7/32 (12 overs)		Peter Birtwisle 34 (56); Jack Simmons 4/25 (12 overs)

Lancashire won by 106 runs
Ropery Lane, Chester-le-Street
Umpires: Terry Spencer & Jack van Geloven
Player of the match: Simon Davis (Durham)

29 June 1983
(scorecard)

Gloucestershire; 297/8 (60 overs)	v	Scotland; 209/6 (60 overs)
Andy Stovold 82; William Morton 4/47 (12 overs)		Terry Racionzer 61; Phil Bainbridge 3/49 (12 overs)

Gloucestershire won by 88 runs
Phoenix County Ground, Bristol
Umpires: Don Oslear & Peter Wight
Player of the match: Phil Bainbridge (Gloucestershire)

29 June 1983
(scorecard)

Hertfordshire; 159/6 (60 overs)	v	Hampshire; 163/1 (48.2 overs)
Francis Collyer 58*; Steve Malone 2/40 (12 overs)		Chris Smith 66*; Robin Johns 1/39 (12 overs)

Hampshire won by 9 wickets
Hitchin Town Cricket Club Ground, Hitchin
Umpires: Barry Dudleston & Arthur Jepson
Player of the match: Francis Collyer (Hertfordshire)

29 June 1983
(scorecard)

Kent; 237/8 (60 overs)	v	Cheshire; 101 all out (57.5 overs)
Chris Tavaré 99; Arthur Sutton 2/50 (12 overs)		Mudassar Nazar 25; Richard Ellison 4/19 (12 overs)

Kent won by 136 runs
St Lawrence Ground, Canterbury
Umpires: John Langridge & Ken Suttle
Player of the match: Chris Tavaré (Kent)

29 June 1983
(scorecard)

Leicestershire; 253/6 (60 overs)	v	Devon; 121 all out (47.1 overs)
Roger Tolchard 71*; Jack Davey 2/45 (12 overs)		Gary Wallen 33; Chris Balderstone 3/9 (5.1 overs)

Leicestershire won by 132 runs
Grace Road, Leicester
Umpires: John Holder & Mervyn Kitchen
Player of the match: Roger Tolchard (Leicestershire)

29 June 1983
(scorecard)

Surrey; 297/6 (60 overs)	v	Lincolnshire; 168 all out (59.5 overs)
Jack Richards 105*; David Marshall 2/34 (12 overs)		Kevin Brooks 51; Ian Payne 5/36 (12 overs)

Surrey won by 129 runs
London Road, Sleaford
Umpires: Dickie Bird & Bob Duckett
Player of the match: Jack Richards (Surrey)

29 June 1983
(scorecard)

Glamorgan; 202/9 (60 overs)	v	Norfolk; 177 all out (56.5 overs)
Rodney Ontong 45; David Pilch 3/15 (4 overs)		Parvez Mir 37; Rodney Ontong 4/49 (9 overs)

Glamorgan won by 25 runs
County Ground, Norwich
Umpires: Billy Ibadulla & Ken Palmer
Player of the match: Rodney Ontong (Glamorgan)

- Andrew Agar (Norfolk) made his List A debut.
- Richard Innes, Philip Ringwood and Peter Thomas (Norfolk) played their only List A match.
- David Pilch (Norfolk) played his final List A match.

29, 30 June 1983
(scorecard)

Somerset; 246 all out (60 overs)	v	Shropshire; 159 all out (55.2 overs)
Viv Richards 74; Brian Perry 4/39 (11 overs)		Brian Perry 43; Joel Garner 3/19 (9 overs)

Somerset won by 87 runs
Orleton Park, Wellington
Umpires: David Shepherd & G.C. Wilson
Player of the match: Brian Perry (Shropshire)

- Match was scheduled for one day but extended to two.

29, 30 June 1983
(scorecard)

Suffolk; 164/8 (60 overs)	v	Derbyshire; 167/4 (56 overs)
Simon Clements 59; Ole Mortensen 3/16 (12 overs)		Alan Hill 52; Philip Caley 2/24 (6 overs)

Derbyshire won by 6 wickets
Victory Ground, Bury St Edmunds
Umpires: Derek Dennis & Terry Spencer
Player of the match: Alan Hill (Derbyshire)

- Match was scheduled for one day but extended to two.

29 June 1983
(scorecard)

Northamptonshire; 285/6 (60 overs)	v	Wiltshire; 120 all out (45 overs)
Allan Lamb 75; John Rice 2/57 (10 overs)		Michael Bailey 31; Richard Williams 3/16 (7 overs)

Northamptonshire won by 165 runs
County Ground, Swindon
Umpires: Bill Alley & Peter Eele
Player of the match: Allan Lamb (Northamptonshire)

29 June 1983
(scorecard)

Nottinghamshire; 169 all out (60 overs)	v	Worcestershire; 167 all out (60 overs)
Tim Robinson 26; Ricardo Ellcock 3/49 (10 overs)		Damian D'Oliveira 48; Kevin Cooper 3/18 (12 overs)

Nottinghamshire won by 2 runs
New Road, Worcester
Umpires: David Constant & Roy Palmer
Player of the match: Damian D'Oliveira (Worcestershire)

29 June 1983
(scorecard)

Sussex; 265/7 (60 overs)	v	Ireland; 141 all out (52.3 overs)
John Barclay 48; Garfield Harrison 3/42 (11 overs)		Afzal Masood 69; Dermot Reeve 3/26 (12 overs)

Sussex won by 124 runs
Castle Avenue, Dublin
Umpires: Jack Birkenshaw & Nigel Plews
Player of the match: Afzal Masood (Ireland)

=== Second round ===
20 July 1983
(scorecard)

Middlesex; 240/8 (60 overs)	v	Derbyshire; 210 all out (58.2 overs)
Graham Barlow 62; Stephen Oldham 2/32 (12 overs)		Kim Barnett 88; Neil Williams 4/36 (9 overs)

Middlesex won by 30 runs
County Ground, Derby
Umpires: Khalid Ibadulla & Barrie Meyer
Player of the match: Kim Barnett (Derbyshire)

20 July 1983
(scorecard)

Kent; 274/8 (60 overs)	v	Essex; 270/9 (60 overs)
Chris Cowdrey 122*; Neil Foster 3/44 (12 overs)		Graham Gooch 122; Richard Ellison 4/54 (12 overs)

Kent won by 4 runs
County Ground, Chelmsford
Umpires: Ray Julian & Terry Spencer
Player of the match: Chris Cowdrey (Kent)

20 July 1983
(scorecard)

Hampshire; 294/5 (60 overs)	v	Glamorgan; 138 all out (41.5 overs)
Gordon Greenidge 108; Charles Rowe 1/32 (5 overs)		Alan Jones 36; Nigel Cowley 4/21 (8.5 overs)

Hampshire won by 156 runs
St. Helen's, Swansea
Umpires: Bill Alley & David Constant
Player of the match: Trevor Jesty (Hampshire)

20 July 1983
(scorecard)

Lancashire; 163/6 (60 overs)	v	Somerset; 164/2 (52.5 overs)
Steve O'Shaughnessy 49*; Viv Richards 2/23 (10 overs)		Nigel Popplewell 68*; Les McFarlane 1/18 (12 overs)

Somerset won by 8 wickets
Old Trafford, Manchester
Umpires: John Holder & Jack van Geloven
Player of the match: Nigel Popplewell (Somerset)

20 July 1983
(scorecard)

Leicestershire; 302/5 (60 overs)	v	Gloucestershire; 306/6 (59.3 overs)
David Gower 138*; David Lawrence 2/51 (12 overs)		Zaheer Abbas 158; Les Taylor 3/45 (12 overs)

Gloucestershire won by 4 wickets
Grace Road, Leicester
Umpires: John Harris & Roy Palmer
Player of the match: Zaheer Abbas (Gloucestershire)

20 July 1983
(scorecard)

Surrey; 138 all out (48.1 overs)	v	Warwickshire; 143/1 (42.5 overs)
David Thomas 37; Bob Willis 3/23 (10.1 overs)		Andy Lloyd 55*; Ian Payne 1/14 (5 overs)

Warwickshire won by 9 wickets
The Oval, London
Umpires: Barrie Leadbeater & David Shepherd
Player of the match: Andy Lloyd (Warwickshire)

20 July 1983
(scorecard)

Sussex; 227/7 (60 overs)	v	Nottinghamshire; 151/8 (60 overs)
Imran Khan 114*; Eddie Hemmings 2/24 (12 overs)		Andrew Pick 34*; John Barclay 3/18 (12 overs)

Sussex won by 76 runs
County Ground, Hove
Umpires: Peter Eele & Mervyn Kitchen
Player of the match: Imran Khan (Sussex)

20 July 1983
(scorecard)

Northamptonshire; 211/7 (60 overs)	v	Yorkshire; 165 all out (55.2 overs)
Allan Lamb 76; Phil Carrick 3/27 (12 overs)		Bill Athey 54; Jim Griffiths 5/33 (10 overs)

Northamptonshire won by 46 runs
Headingley, Leeds
Umpires: Arthur Jepson & Bob White
Player of the match: Jim Griffiths (Northamptonshire)

=== Quarter-finals ===
3 August 1983
(scorecard)

Gloucestershire; 252/8 (60 overs)	v	Hampshire; 256/4 (58.2 overs)
Paul Romaines 82; Nigel Cowley 2/31 (12 overs)		Chris Smith 101*; David Lawrence 1/40 (10.5 overs)

Hampshire won by 6 wickets
Phoenix County Ground, Bristol
Umpires: David Evans & Terry Spencer
Player of the match: Chris Smith (Hampshire)

3 August 1983
(scorecard)

Kent; 251/8 (60 overs)	v	Warwickshire; 146 all out (51.5 overs)
Chris Cowdrey 56; Anton Ferreira 3/43 (12 overs)		Geoff Humpage 31; Kevin Jarvis 4/19 (7.5 overs)

Kent won by 105 runs
St Lawrence Ground, Canterbury
Umpires: Jack van Geloven & Peter Wight
Player of the match: Kevin Jarvis (Kent)

3 August 1983
(scorecard)

Northamptonshire; 198/9 (60 overs)	v	Middlesex; 199/3 (53.4 overs)
Peter Willey 41; Wilf Slack 3/37 (12 overs)		Graham Barlow 77; Neil Mallender 2/37 (12 overs)

Middlesex won by 7 wickets
County Ground, Northampton
Umpires: Dickie Bird & Alan Whitehead
Player of the match: Graham Barlow (Middlesex)

3 August 1983
(scorecard)

Sussex; 65 all out (40.4 overs)	v	Somerset; 69/3 (23.5 overs)
Tony Pigott 17; Joel Garner 4/8 (11 overs)		Jeremy Lloyds 28; Dermot Reeve 2/28 (8.5 overs)

Somerset won by 7 wickets
County Ground, Hove
Umpires: Sam Cook & David Shepherd
Player of the match: Trevor Gard (Somerset)

=== Semi-finals ===
17 August 1983
(scorecard)

Kent; 173 all out (59.2 overs)	v	Hampshire; 102 all out (39.4 overs)
Chris Tavaré 64; Malcolm Marshall 4/15 (12 overs)		Mark Nicholas 28; Eldine Baptiste 5/20 (12 overs)

Kent won by 71 runs
St Lawrence Ground, Canterbury
Umpires: Ken Palmer & Nigel Plews
Player of the match: Eldine Baptiste (Kent)

17 August 1983
(scorecard)

Middlesex; 222/9 (60 overs)	v	Somerset; 222/8 (60 overs)
Keith Tomlins 58; Joel Garner 3/23 (11 overs)		Ian Botham 96*; Norman Cowans 3/48 (12 overs)

Somerset won by losing fewer wickets
Lord's, London
Umpires: Jack Birkenshaw & Don Oslear
Player of the match: Ian Botham (Somerset)

=== Final ===
3 September 1983
(scorecard)

Somerset; 193/9 (50 overs)	v	Kent; 169 all out (47.1 overs)
Viv Richards 51 (59); Graham Dilley 4/29 (10 overs)		Chris Tavaré 39 (80); Vic Marks 3/30 (10 overs)

Somerset won by 24 runs
Lord's, London
Umpires: David Constant & David Evans
Player of the match: Vic Marks (Somerset)

- Match was reduced before play started to 50 overs per side.
