= 1980 Gillette Cup =

- Administrator: Test and County Cricket Board
- Cricket format: Limited overs cricket (60 overs per innings)
- Tournament format: Knockout
- Champions: Middlesex (2nd title)
- Participants: 23
- Matches: 22
- Most runs: 296 Gehan Mendis (Sussex)
- Most wickets: 17 Robin Jackman (Surrey)

The 1980 Gillette Cup was an English limited overs county cricket tournament held between 2 July and 6 September 1980. It was the eighteenth and final Gillette Cup before it was renamed as the NatWest Trophy in 1981. Middlesex won the tournament, defeating Surrey by 7 wickets in the final at Lord's.

== Format ==
The seventeen first-class counties were joined by five Minor Counties: Cornwall, Devon, Durham, Oxfordshire and Suffolk. The tournament also marked the first time that Ireland were included. Teams who won in the first round progressed to the second round. The winners in the second round then progressed to the quarter-final stage. Winners from the quarter-finals then progressed to the semi-finals from which the winners then went on to the final at Lord's which was held on 2 September 1980.

=== First round ===
2 July 1980
(scorecard)

Devon; 229/5 (60 overs)	v	Cornwall; 84 all out (37.1 overs)
Gary Wallen 104; Michael Trenwith 3/51 (12 overs)		Eric Willcock 43; Martyn Goulding 5/21 (10.1 overs)

Devon won by 145 runs
County Ground, Exeter
Umpires: Ken Palmer & Roy Palmer
Player of the match: Gary Wallen (Devon)

2 July 1980
(scorecard)

Ireland; 102 all out (51.4 overs)	v	Middlesex; 105/5 (38.3 overs)
Ivan Anderson 37 (82); Vintcent van der Bijl 5/12 (10.4 overs)		Graham Barlow 39* (92); Michael Halliday 4/22 (12 overs)

Middlesex won by 5 wickets
Lord's, London
Umpires: Terry Spencer & Tom Spencer
Player of the match: Vintcent van der Bijl (Middlesex)

2, 3 July 1980
(scorecard)

Durham; 186 all out (59.1 overs)	v	Nottinghamshire; 187/6 (58.5 overs)
Wasim Raja 53 (60); Peter Hacker 4/30 (11.1 overs)		Clive Rice 48 (84); Peter Kippax 3/25 (12 overs)

Nottinghamshire won by 4 wickets
Trent Bridge, Nottingham
Umpires: Don Oslear & Peter Stevens
Player of the match: Wasim Raja (Durham)

- Match was scheduled for one day but extended to two.

2 July 1980
(scorecard)

Somerset; 165 all out (49.1 overs)	v	Worcestershire; 168/8 (59.2 overs)
Brian Rose 38; Paul Pridgeon 3/25 (9.1 overs)		David Humphries 51; Hugh Gore 3/19 (12 overs)

Worcestershire won by 2 wickets
County Ground, Taunton
Umpires: Sam Cook & Bob Herman
Player of the match: David Humphries (Worcestershire)

2 July 1980
(scorecard)

Northamptonshire; 141 all out (59.5 overs)	v	Surrey; 143/3 (43 overs)
Sarfraz Nawaz 39*; Robin Jackman 6/32 (12 overs)		David Smith 59*; Tim Lamb 1/20 (5 overs)

Surrey won by 7 wickets
The Oval, London
Umpires: Dickie Bird & Ray Julian
Player of the match: Robin Jackman (Surrey)

2 July 1980
(scorecard)

Suffolk; 185/8 (60 overs)	v	Sussex; 186/2 (49.1 overs)
Timur Mohamed 85; Garth Le Roux 3/27 (12 overs)		Paul Phillipson 70*; Richard Done 1/45 (12 overs)

Sussex won by 8 wickets
County Ground, Hove
Umpires: Bill Alley & Lloyd Budd
Player of the match: Imran Khan (Sussex)

2 July 1980
(scorecard)

Warwickshire; 314/6 (60 overs)	v	Oxfordshire; 180/8 (60 overs)
Dennis Amiss 82; Derek Gallop 2/62 (12 overs)		Mike Nurton 67*; Dilip Doshi 3/52 (12 overs)

Warwickshire won by 134 runs
Edgbaston, Birmingham
Umpires: Barrie Meyer & Jack van Geloven
Player of the match: Dennis Amiss (Warwickshire)

=== Second round ===
16 July 1980
(scorecard)

Derbyshire; 215/8 (60 overs)	v	Hampshire; 216/6 (57.5 overs)
Geoff Miller 58; Shaun Graf 3/44 (12 overs)		Trevor Jesty 118; Stephen Oldham 2/49 (11.5 overs)

Hampshire won by 4 wickets
County Ground, Derby
Umpires: Sam Cook & Alan Whitehead
Player of the match: Trevor Jesty (Hampshire)

16 July 1980
(scorecard)

Essex; 310/7 (60 overs)	v	Leicestershire; 197 all out (52.2 overs)
Ken McEwan 119; Nigel Briers 2/29 (4 overs)		Brian Davison 43; Stuart Turner 2/25 (11 overs)

Essex won by 113 runs
Grace Road, Leicester
Umpires: Ron Aspinall & David Evans
Player of the match: Ken McEwan (Essex)

16 July 1980
(scorecard)

Nottinghamshire; 190/7 (60 overs)	v	Middlesex; 194/6 (57.4 overs)
Paul Todd 41; Mike Selvey 2/27 (12 overs)		Mike Gatting 95*; Kevin Cooper 2/17 (12 overs)

Middlesex won by 4 wickets
Trent Bridge, Nottingham
Umpires: Arthur Jepson & Jack van Geloven
Player of the match: Mike Gatting (Middlesex)

16 July 1980
(scorecard)

Surrey; 200 all out (60 overs)	v	Gloucestershire; 192/9 (60 overs)
Roger Knight 59; David Graveney 2/16 (12 overs)		Mike Procter 52; Robin Jackman 4/26 (12 overs)

Surrey won by 8 runs
The Oval, London
Umpires: David Halfyard & Bob Herman
Player of the match: Roger Knight (Surrey)

16 July 1980
(scorecard)

Sussex; 258/7 (60 overs)	v	Glamorgan; 154 all out (48.3 overs)
Gehan Mendis 119; Allan Jones 3/49 (12 overs)		Rodney Ontong 31; Imran Khan 3/19 (8 overs)

Sussex won by 104 runs
County Ground, Hove
Umpires: Derek Dennis & Derek Shackleton
Player of the match: Gehan Mendis (Sussex)

16 July 1980
(scorecard)

Devon; 143/8 (60 overs)	v	Warwickshire; 147/3 (43.2 overs)
Brad Green 59; Dilip Doshi 3/27 (12 overs)		Andy Lloyd 81; Brad Green 1/34 (12 overs)

Warwickshire won by 7 wickets
Edgbaston, Birmingham
Umpires: Don Oslear & Roy Palmer
Player of the match: Brad Green (Devon)

16 July 1980
(scorecard)

Worcestershire; 265/9 (60 overs)	v	Lancashire; 226/9 (60 overs)
Glenn Turner 115; Neal Radford 3/52 (12 overs)		Frank Hayes 63; Paul Pridgeon 3/41 (12 overs)

Worcestershire won by 39 runs
New Road, Worcester
Umpires: David Constant & Peter Wight
Player of the match: Glenn Turner (Worcestershire)

16 July 1980
(scorecard)

Yorkshire; 279/6 (60 overs)	v	Kent; 233 all out (56 overs)
Bill Athey 115; Kevin Jarvis 3/59 (12 overs)		Bob Woolmer 91; Arnie Sidebottom 4/35 (10 overs)

Yorkshire won by 46 runs
Headingley, Leeds
Umpires: Barrie Meyer & Terry Spencer
Player of the match: Bill Athey (Yorkshire)

=== Quarter-finals ===
30 July 1980
(scorecard)

Surrey; 195/7 (60 overs)	v	Essex; 195 all out (59.5 overs)
Grahame Clinton 58; John Lever 3/26 (12 overs)		Brian Hardie 70; Robin Jackman 5/22 (12 overs)

Surrey won by losing fewer wickets
County Ground, Chelmsford
Umpires: Dickie Bird & Alan Whitehead
Player of the match: Robin Jackman (Surrey)

30 July 1980
(scorecard)

Hampshire; 196 all out (59 overs)	v	Yorkshire; 197/3 (54.5 overs)
David Turner 53; Graham Stevenson 3/32 (11 overs)		Bill Athey 93*; Keith Stevenson 1/27 (12 overs)

Yorkshire won by 7 wickets
County Ground, Southampton
Umpires: David Constant & John Langridge
Player of the match: Bill Athey (Yorkshire)

30 July 1980
(scorecard)

Warwickshire; 210/8 (60 overs)	v	Sussex; 214/1 (49.1 overs)
David Smith 64; John Spencer 2/26 (12 overs)		Gehan Mendis 141*; Gladstone Small 1/51 (9 overs)

Sussex won by 9 wickets
County Ground, Hove
Umpires: Ray Julian & Ken Palmer
Player of the match: Gehan Mendis (Sussex)

30 July 1980
(scorecard)

Worcestershire; 126 all out (54.2 overs)	v	Middlesex; 127/0 (44.5 overs)
Glenn Turner 32; Simon Hughes 3/23 (12 overs)		Clive Radley 64*

Middlesex won by 10 wickets
New Road, Worcester
Umpires: Lloyd Budd & Peter Wight
Player of the match: Simon Hughes (Middlesex)

=== Semi-finals ===
13, 14 August 1980
(scorecard)

Yorkshire; 135 all out (53.5 overs)	v	Surrey; 136/6 (47.5 overs)
David Bairstow 26; Sylvester Clarke 4/38 (11.5 overs)		Grahame Clinton 33; Arnie Sidebottom 3/37 (9.5 overs)

Surrey won by 4 wickets
The Oval, London
Umpires: Bill Alley & Tom Spencer
Player of the match: Roger Knight (Surrey)

- Match was scheduled for one day but extended to two.

13, 14 August 1980
(scorecard)

Middlesex; 179 all out (60 overs)	v	Sussex; 115 all out (49.2 overs)
Mike Gatting 32; Geoff Arnold 3/17 (12 overs)		Colin Wells 23; Wayne Daniel 6/15 (10 overs)

Middlesex won by 64 runs
County Ground, Hove
Umpires: Arthur Jepson & Peter Wight
Player of the match: Wayne Daniel (Middlesex)

- Match was scheduled for one day but extended to two.

=== Final ===
6 September 1980
(scorecard)

Surrey; 201 all out (60 overs)	v	Middlesex; 203/3 (53.5 overs)
David Smith 50 (94); Simon Hughes 3/60 (11 overs)		Mike Brearley 96* (161); Robin Jackman 1/31 (11 overs)

Middlesex won by 7 wickets
Lord's, London
Umpires: Dickie Bird & John Langridge
Player of the match: Mike Brearley (Middlesex)
