= 1979 Gillette Cup =

- Administrator: Test and County Cricket Board
- Cricket format: Limited overs cricket (60 overs per innings)
- Tournament format: Knockout
- Champions: Somerset (1st title)
- Participants: 22
- Matches: 21
- Most runs: 266 Viv Richards (Somerset)
- Most wickets: 17 Joel Garner (Somerset)
- Official website: CricketArchive tournament page

The 1979 Gillette Cup was the seventeenth Gillette Cup, an English limited overs county cricket tournament. It was held between 27 June and 8 September 1979. The tournament was won by Somerset County Cricket Club who defeated Northamptonshire County Cricket Club by 45 runs in the final at Lord's.

== Format ==
The seventeen first-class counties, were joined by five Minor Counties: Berkshire, Buckinghamshire, Devon, Durham and Suffolk. Teams who won in the first round progressed to the second round. The winners in the second round then progressed to the quarter-final stage. Winners from the quarter-finals then progressed to the semi-finals from which the winners then went on to the final at Lord's which was held on 8 September 1979.

=== First round ===
27 June 1979
(scorecard)

| Buckinghamshire; 133 all out (60 overs) | v | Suffolk; 137/8 (38 overs) |
| Terence Cordaroy 44; Richard Done 3/9 (11 overs) | | Paul Rice 45; Peter Gooch 3/51 (12 overs) |

Suffolk won by 2 wickets
London Road, High Wycombe
Umpires: John Griffiths & Arthur Jepson
Player of the match: Paul Rice (Suffolk)

27 June 1979
(scorecard)

| Durham; 221/7 (60 overs) | v | Berkshire; 127/7 (60 overs) |
| Stephen Greensword 48*; Jefferson Jones 4/35 (12 overs) | | David Johnston 37; Peter Kippax 3/24 (12 overs) |

Durham won by 94 runs
Green Lane, Durham
Umpires: Tom Spencer & Jack van Geloven
Player of the match: Stephen Greensword (Durham)

27 June 1979
(scorecard)

| Glamorgan; 177/9 (60 overs) | v | Kent; 178/5 (52 overs) |
| Peter Swart 40; Bob Woolmer 3/31 (12 overs) | | Alan Ealham 85*; Rodney Ontong 2/47 (9 overs) |

Kent won by 5 wickets
St. Helen's, Swansea
Umpires: Derek Shackleton & Peter Wight
Player of the match: Alan Ealham (Kent)

27 June 1979
(scorecard)

| Hampshire; 273/6 (60 overs) | v | Gloucestershire; 218 all out (55.2 overs) |
| Nigel Cowley 63*; Mike Procter 3/47 (12 overs) | | Sadiq Mohammad 62; Trevor Jesty 6/46 (11.2 overs) |

Hampshire won by 55 runs
Phoenix County Ground, Bristol
Umpires: Sam Cook & David Halfyard
Player of the match: Trevor Jesty (Hampshire)

27 June 1979
(scorecard)

| Lancashire; 247/5 (60 overs) | v | Essex; 177 all out (53.4 overs) |
| Clive Lloyd 76; Keith Pont 2/25 (12 overs) | | Keith Pont 27; David Hughes 3/22 (12 overs) |

Lancashire won by 70 runs
Old Trafford, Manchester
Umpires: Eddie Phillipson & Terry Spencer
Player of the match: Jack Simmons (Lancashire)

27 June 1979
(scorecard)

| Devon; 111 all out (56 overs) | v | Leicestershire; 114/1 (31.4 overs) |
| Michael Wagstaffe 21; Ken Shuttleworth 3/26 (12 overs) | | John Steele 76*; Tony Allin 1/37 (9 overs) |

Leicestershire won by 9 wickets
Grace Road, Leicester
Umpires: Ron Aspinall & Ray Julian
Player of the match: John Steele (Leicestershire)

=== Second round ===
18 July 1979
(scorecard)

| Durham; 213/9 (60 overs) | v | Yorkshire; 214/6 (59.1 overs) |
| Wasim Raja 52; Howard Cooper 3/39 (12 overs) | | Geoff Boycott 92; Lance Cairns 2/35 (12 overs) |

Yorkshire won by 4 wickets
Ropery Lane, Chester-le-Street
Umpires: Ron Aspinall & Tom Spencer
Player of the match: Geoff Boycott (Yorkshire)

18, 19 July 1979
(scorecard)

| Kent; 278/7 (60 overs) | v | Lancashire; 260/9 (60 overs) |
| Chris Tavaré 87; Jack Simmons 3/53 (10 overs) | | Barry Wood 116; Asif Iqbal 4/18 (6 overs) |

Kent won by 18 runs
St Lawrence Ground, Canterbury
Umpires: Arthur Jepson & Don Oslear
Player of the match: Asif Iqbal (Kent)

- Match was scheduled for one day but extended to two.

18 July 1979
(scorecard)

| Leicestershire; 326/6 (60 overs) | v | Worcestershire; 183 all out (50 overs) |
| Barry Dudleston 125; Younis Ahmed 2/54 (10 overs) | | Younis Ahmed 44; Paddy Clift 3/36 (12 overs) |

Leicestershire won by 143 runs
Grace Road, Leicester
Umpires: Lloyd Budd & Peter Wight
Player of the match: Barry Dudleston (Leicestershire)

18 July 1979
(scorecard)

| Hampshire; 193 all out (54.5 overs) | v | Middlesex; 196/8 (58.5 overs) |
| Gordon Greenidge 87; Wayne Daniel 3/41 (9.5 overs) | | Mike Brearley 31; Nigel Cowley 4/20 (12 overs) |

Middlesex won by 2 wickets
Lord's, London
Umpires: Bill Alley & David Halfyard
Player of the match: Gordon Greenidge (Hampshire)

18 July 1979
(scorecard)

| Surrey; 238/8 (60 overs) | v | Northamptonshire; 240/4 (56 overs) |
| David Smith 61; Tim Lamb 3/37 (12 overs) | | Geoff Cook 114*; Pat Pocock 2/42 (12 overs) |

Northamptonshire won by 6 wickets
County Ground, Northampton
Umpires: Dickie Bird & Alan Whitehead
Player of the match: Geoff Cook (Northamptonshire)

18 July 1979
(scorecard)

| Derbyshire; 224/7 (60 overs) | v | Somerset; 226/2 (56.1 overs) |
| David Steele 81*; Keith Jennings 3/31 (12 overs) | | Brian Rose 88*; Kim Barnett 1/30 (5.1 overs) |

Somerset won by 8 wickets
County Ground, Taunton
Umpires: John Langridge & Ken Palmer
Player of the match: Brian Rose (Somerset)

18 July 1979
(scorecard)

| Suffolk; 158 all out (55.3 overs) | v | Sussex; 159/8 (49.5 overs) |
| Roger Howlett 35*; John Spencer 3/23 (11 overs) | | Imran Khan 37*; Colin Rutterford 3/28 (12 overs) |

Sussex won by 2 wickets
County Ground, Hove
Umpires: Sam Cook & Derek Dennis
Player of the match: Imran Khan (Sussex)

18 July 1979
(scorecard)

| Nottinghamshire; 265 all out (60 overs) | v | Warwickshire; 186 all out (51 overs) |
| Paul Todd 105; Anton Ferreira 4/50 (12 overs) | | John Whitehouse 41; Peter Hacker 3/27 (10 overs) |

Nottinghamshire won by 79 runs
Edgbaston, Birmingham
Umpires: David Evans & Jack van Geloven
Player of the match: Paul Todd (Nottinghamshire)

=== Quarter-finals ===
8, 9 August 1979
(scorecard)

| Middlesex; 216 all out (60 overs) | v | Yorkshire; 146 all out (54.3 overs) |
| Mike Brearley 76; Howard Cooper 4/29 (12 overs) | | Bill Athey 35; Phil Edmonds 3/28 (12 overs) |

Middlesex won by 70 runs
Lord's, London
Umpires: John Langridge & Don Oslear
Player of the match: Mike Brearley (Middlesex)

- Match was scheduled for one day but extended to two.

8 August 1979
(scorecard)

| Leicestershire; 180 all out (59.4 overs) | v | Northamptonshire; 184/2 (55.4 overs) |
| Barry Dudleston 59; Richard Williams 3/15 (12 overs) | | Wayne Larkins 92*; John Steele 1/30 (12 overs) |

Northamptonshire won by 8 wickets
County Ground, Northampton
Umpires: Barrie Meyer & Alan Whitehead
Player of the match: Richard Williams (Northamptonshire)

8 August 1979
(scorecard)

| Somerset; 190 all out (59.2 overs) | v | Kent; 60 all out (28.4 overs) |
| Graham Burgess 50*; Bob Woolmer 4/28 (12 overs) | | Chris Cowdrey 12; Joel Garner 5/11 (9.4 overs) |

Somerset won by 130 runs
County Ground, Taunton
Umpires: David Constant & David Evans
Player of the match: Joel Garner (Somerset)

8 August 1979
(scorecard)

| Nottinghamshire; 200 all out (56.4 overs) | v | Sussex; 201/4 (54.1 overs) |
| Derek Randall 75; Geoff Arnold 3/27 (10 overs) | | Gehan Mendis 55; Peter Hacker 2/44 (12 overs) |

Sussex won by 6 wickets
County Ground, Hove
Umpires: Lloyd Budd & Peter Wight
Player of the match: Derek Randall (Nottinghamshire)

=== Semi-finals ===
22 August 1979
(scorecard)

| Middlesex; 185 all out (57.5 overs) | v | Somerset; 190/3 (50.2 overs) |
| Phil Edmonds 63*; Joel Garner 4/24 (10.5 overs) | | Peter Denning 90*; Mike Selvey 1/31 (11.2 overs) |

Somerset won by 7 wickets
Lord's, London
Umpires: David Halfyard & Ray Julian
Player of the match: Peter Denning (Somerset)

22 August 1979
(scorecard)

| Northamptonshire; 255/7 (60 overs) | v | Sussex; 218 all out (55.2 overs) |
| Allan Lamb 101; Geoff Arnold 3/45 (12 overs) | | Gehan Mendis 69; Tim Lamb 4/52 (12 overs) |

Northamptonshire won by 37 runs
County Ground, Hove
Umpires: Bill Alley & David Evans
Player of the match: Peter Willey (Northamptonshire)

=== Final ===
8 September 1979
(scorecard)

| Somerset; 269/8 (60 overs) | v | Northamptonshire; 224 all out (56.3 overs) |
| Viv Richards 117 (136); Jim Watts 2/34 (12 overs) | | Allan Lamb 78 (127); Joel Garner 6/29 (10.3 overs) |

Somerset won by 45 runs
Lord's, London
Umpires: David Constant & John Langridge
Player of the match: Viv Richards (Somerset)
