= Catley =

Catley is a suburb of Peterborough, UK and a surname. Notable people with the surname include:

- Ann Catley (1745–1789), English singer and actress
- Bob Catley (born 1947), English singer and musician
- Bob Catley (politician) (born 1942), Australian Labor politician
- Christine Cole Catley (1922–2011), New Zealand journalist, publisher and author.
- Elaine M. Catley (1889–1984), Canadian poet
- Glenn Catley (born 1972), British retired professional boxer
- Gwen Catley (1906–1996), English coloratura soprano
- Has Catley (1915–1975), New Zealand rugby union player
- Matthew Catley (born 1975), English cricketer
- Russell Catley (1973–2020), English cricketer
- Steph Catley (born 1994), Australian football
- Timothy Catley (born 1977), English cricketer
- Yasmin Catley, Australian politician
