= Cunnell =

Cunnell is a surname. Notable people with the surname include:

- Bob Cunnell (1942–2023), English cricketer
- Clifford Cunnell (born 1944), English cricketer, brother of Bob
- Donald Cunnell (1893–1917), British aviator

== See also ==
- Connell (surname)
