= Peter Crane (cricketer) =

English cricketer (born 1950)

Personal information
- Full name: Peter John Crane
- Born: 15 March 1950 (age 76); South Shields, County Durham, England
- Batting: Right-handed
- Bowling: Right-arm off break

Domestic team information
- Years: Team
- 1973–1983: Durham

Career statistics
Competition	List A
Matches	2
Runs scored	17
Batting average	17.00
100s/50s	–/–
Top score	17
Balls bowled	–
Wickets	–
Bowling average	–
5 wickets in innings	–
10 wickets in match	–
Best bowling	–
Catches/stumpings	–/–
- Source: Cricinfo, 7 August 2011

Peter John Crane (born 15 March 1950) is a former English cricketer. Crane was a right-handed batsman who bowled right-arm off break. He was born in South Shields, County Durham.

Crane made his debut for Durham against Shropshire in the 1973 Minor Counties Championship. He played Minor counties cricket for Durham from 1973 to 1983, making 64 Minor Counties Championship appearances. He made his List A debut against Yorkshire in the Gillette Cup. He wasn't required to bat in this match, which Durham famously 5 wickets against first-class opposition. He made a further List A appearance against Nottinghamshire in the 1980 Gillette Cup. He was dismissed for 17 runs in this match by Peter Hacker, with Nottinghamshire winning by 4 wickets.
