= Robert Flack =

Robert Flack may refer to:

- Robert Flack (South African cricketer) (1917–1993), South African cricketer who played for Eastern Province
- Robert Flack (English cricketer) (born 1943), English cricketer who played for Suffolk

== See also ==
- Roberta Flack (1937–2025), American singer
