= Colin Graham (disambiguation) =

Colin Graham (1931–2007) was a stage director of opera, theatre, and television

Colin Graham may also refer to:

- Colin Graham (footballer, born 1915) (1915–2000), Australian footballer for Geelong
- Colin Graham (footballer, born 1958), Australian footballer for Melbourne
- Colin Graham (English cricketer) (born 1957), English cricketer
- Colin Graham (New Zealand cricketer) (1929–2020), New Zealand cricketer
