= Peter Hacker (disambiguation) =

Peter Hacker (born 1939) is a philosopher.

Peter Hacker may also refer to:

- Peter Hacker (cricketer) (born 1952), English cricketer
- Peter Hacker, character in The Ambassador
