= Keith Bishop (cricketer) =

English cricketer

Personal information
- Full name: Keith Charles Bishop
- Born: 11 March 1949 (age 77); Bury St Edmunds, Suffolk, England
- Batting: Right-handed
- Bowling: Right-arm medium
- Relatives: Justin Bishop (son)

Domestic team information
- Years: Team
- 1979–1980: Suffolk

Career statistics
Competition	List A
Matches	2
Runs scored	3
Batting average	–
100s/50s	–/–
Top score	3*
Balls bowled	72
Wickets	1
Bowling average	27.00
5 wickets in innings	–
10 wickets in match	–
Best bowling	1/27
Catches/stumpings	–/–
- Source: Cricinfo, 6 July 2011

Keith Charles Bishop (born 11 March 1949) is a former English cricketer. Bishop was a right-handed batsman who bowled right-arm medium pace. He was born in Bury St Edmunds, Suffolk.

Bishop made his debut for Suffolk in a List A match debut against Buckinghamshire in the 1979 Gillette Cup. In this match, he took the wicket of Keith Edwards for the cost of 27 runs from 12 overs, while with the bat he ended the Suffolk innings unbeaten on 0, with Suffolk winning the match by 2 wickets. He played a further List A match, which came in the 1980 Gillette Cup against Sussex. In this match, he scored 3 unbeaten runs, while he wasn't required to bat. He didn't feature in Minor counties cricket for Suffolk.

His son, Justin, played first-class cricket for Essex and Durham UCCE, as well as List A and Minor counties cricket for Suffolk.
