= Paul Douglas =

Paul Douglas may refer to:

- Paul Douglas (Illinois politician) (1892–1976), American economist and U.S. senator
- Paul Douglas (actor) (1907–1959), American film actor
- Paul P. Douglas Jr. (1919–2002), United States Air Force officer
- Paul L. Douglas (1927–2012), Nebraska Attorney General
- Paul Douglas (musician) (born 1950), Jamaican drummer and percussionist
- Paul Douglas (cameraman) (1957–2006), British CBS News cameraman
- Paul Douglas (meteorologist) (born 1958), American meteorologist
- Paul Douglas (boxer) (born 1964), Irish boxer
- Paul Douglas (cricketer) (born 1971), English cricketer
- Rosy Parlane, New Zealand electronic musician, born Paul Douglas
- Paul Douglas (footballer) (born 1997), Bermudan footballer

== See also ==
- Paul Douglass (1905–1988), president of American University
