= Justin Bishop =

Justin Bishop may refer to:

- Justin Bishop (rugby union) (born 1974), Irish rugby union player
- Justin Bishop (cricketer) (born 1982), English cricketer
