= Keith Bishop =

Keith Bishop may refer to:

- Keith Bishop (American football) (born 1957), American football player
- Keith Bishop (The Office), a fictional TV comedy character
- Keith Bishop (cricketer) (born 1949), former English cricketer
