= Gofton =

Gofton is an English surname. Notable people with the surname include:

- Pete Gofton, English musician
- Alan Gofton, English cricketer
- Francis Gofton, English courtier and administrator
- Robert Gofton, English cricketer
- Simon Gofton, part of design team Tappin Gofton
