= Wijesuriya =

Wijesuriya is a Sinhalese surname that may refer to

- Gemunu Wijesuriya (1934–2007), Sri Lankan broadcaster, comedian, singer and radio producer
- Glucka Wijesuriya (born 1957), Sri Lankan-born English cricketer
- Premawathie Manamperi (1949–1971), Sri Lankan Kataragama beauty queen
- Roger Wijesuriya (born 1960), Sri Lankan cricketer
- Suneetha Wijesuriya, Sri Lankan chess player
