= Brian Perry =

Brian Perry may refer to:

- Brian Perry (cricketer) (1943–2017), English cricketer
- Brian Perry (ice hockey) (born 1944), former ice hockey left wing
- Brian Perry (musician) American hard rock bassist for bands like Dirty Looks, Lizzy Borden, and Prong
- Brian Perry (veterinary surgeon) (born 1946), British veterinary surgeon and epidemiologist
