= Ian Prior =

Ian Prior may refer to:

- Ian Prior (cricketer) (1930–2007), English cricketer
- Ian Prior (rugby union) (born 1990), Australian rugby union player
- Ian Prior (doctor) (1923–2009), New Zealand doctor, epidemiologist, environmental campaigner and arts patron
