= London Road, Sleaford =

Cricket ground in Sleaford, England

Coordinates: 52°59′38.62″N 0°24′32.02″W

London Road
- Sleaford Cricket Club
- Interactive map of London Road

Ground information
- Location: Sleaford, Lincolnshire
- Country: England
- Establishment: 1851
- Website: http://www.sleafordcc.co.uk

Team information
Lincolnshire	(1912–present)
- As of 23 May 2010; Source: Ground profile

London Road is a cricket ground in Sleaford, Lincolnshire. It is the home of Sleaford Cricket Club and an occasional venue for Lincolnshire County Cricket Club.

The ground was established in 1851, when Sleaford played an All England Eleven. In 1860 and 1864, two first-class matches were played on the ground in the North v South fixtures. The first Minor Counties Championship match played on the ground was in 1912 between Lincolnshire and Cambridgeshire. To date the ground has hosted 45 Minor Counties matches.

The first List-A match played on the ground came in 1983 NatWest Trophy between Lincolnshire and Surrey. From 1983 to 2002, the ground hosted five List-A matches, the last of which came in the 2002 Cheltenham & Gloucester Trophy between Lincolnshire and Glamorgan.
