= David Marshall (cricketer, born 1946) =

English cricketer

Personal information
- Full name: David Marshall
- Born: 18 May 1946 (age 80); Flixborough, Lincolnshire, England
- Batting: Right-handed
- Bowling: Slow left-arm orthodox

Domestic team information
- Years: Team
- 1979–1991: Lincolnshire

Career statistics
Competition	List A
Matches	4
Runs scored	9
Batting average	3.00
100s/50s	–/–
Top score	5
Balls bowled	288
Wickets	4
Bowling average	53.00
5 wickets in innings	–
10 wickets in match	–
Best bowling	2/34
Catches/stumpings	1/–
- Source: Cricinfo, 25 June 2011

David Marshall (born 18 May 1946) is a former English cricketer. Marshall was a right-handed batsman who bowled slow left-arm orthodox. He was born in Flixborough, Lincolnshire.

Marshall made his debut for Lincolnshire in the 1979 Minor Counties Championship against Cambridgeshire. Marshall played Minor counties cricket for Lincolnshire from 1979 to 1991, which included 107 Minor Counties Championship matches and 11 MCCA Knockout Trophy matches. He made his List A debut against Surrey in the 1983 NatWest Trophy. He played 3 further List A matches for Lincolnshire, the last coming against Nottinghamshire in the 1991 NatWest Trophy. In his 4 matches, he took 4 wickets at an average of 53.00, with best figures of 2/34.

David played all of his club cricket in North Lincolnshire, first as a junior for Alkborough Cricket club before moving to Normanby Park and playing there for almost 30 years. He later moved to West Butterwick where he would turn out for their village side when Normanby didn't have a game and would also play in the Isle of Axholme evening league for Outcasts cricket club in crowle.
