= Martin Lickley =

English cricketer

Personal information
- Full name: Martin Gregory Lickley
- Born: 15 August 1957 (age 69); Windsor, Berkshire, England
- Batting: Right-handed
- Bowling: Right-arm medium

Domestic team information
- Years: Team
- 1981–1993: Berkshire

Career statistics
| Competition | LA |
|---|---|
| Matches | 9 |
| Runs scored | 165 |
| Batting average | 18.33 |
| 100s/50s | –/– |
| Top score | 44 |
| Balls bowled | 54 |
| Wickets | 1 |
| Bowling average | 41.00 |
| 5 wickets in innings | – |
| 10 wickets in match | – |
| Best bowling | 1/15 |
| Catches/stumpings | 1/– |
- Source: Cricinfo, 24 September 2010

Martin Gregory Lickley (born 15 August 1957) is a former English cricketer. Lickley was a right-handed batsman who bowled right-arm medium pace. He was born at Windsor, Berkshire.

Lickley made his Minor Counties Championship debut for Berkshire in 1981 against Buckinghamshire. From 1981 to 1993, he represented the county in 105 Minor Counties Championship matches, the last of which came in the 1993 Championship when Berkshire played Wales Minor Counties. Lickley also played in the MCCA Knockout Trophy for Berkshire. His debut in that competition came in 1983 when Berkshire played Norfolk. From 1983 to 1993, he represented the county in 17 Trophy matches, the last of which came when Berkshire played Hertfordshire in the 1993 MCCA Knockout Trophy.

Additionally, he also played List-A matches for Berkshire. His List-A debut for the county came against Yorkshire in the 1983 NatWest Trophy. From 1983 to 1992, he represented the county in 9 matches, with his final List-A match coming when Berkshire played Derbyshire in the 1992 NatWest Trophy at the County Ground, Derby. In his 9 matches, he scored 165 runs at a batting average of 18.33, with a high score of 44. With the ball he took a single wicket at a cost of 41.00, with best figures of 1/15.
