= Peter Gooch =

English cricketer (born 1949)

Personal information
- Full name: Peter Anthony Gooch
- Born: 2 May 1949 (age 77); Timperley, Cheshire, England
- Batting: Left-handed
- Bowling: Right-arm fast-medium

Domestic team information
- Years: Team
- 1979: Minor Counties South
- 1978: Minor Counties West
- 1976–1979: Buckinghamshire
- 1971: Cheshire
- 1970: Lancashire

Career statistics
Competition	First-class	List A
Matches	4	10
Runs scored	0	24
Batting average	0.00	4.80
100s/50s	–/–	–/–
Top score	0*	8
Balls bowled	499	487
Wickets	6	5
Bowling average	42.00	63.60
5 wickets in innings	–	–
10 wickets in match	–	–
Best bowling	4/52	3/51
Catches/stumpings	3/–	3/–
- Source: Cricinfo, 6 May 2011

Peter Anthony Gooch (born 2 May 1949) is a former English cricketer. Gooch was a left-handed batsman who bowled right-arm fast-medium. He was born in Timperley, Cheshire.

== Career ==
Gooch made his first-class debut for Lancashire against Oxford University in 1970. He played 3 further first-class matches in 1970, the last coming against Glamorgan in the County Championship. In his 4 first-class matches for Lancashire, he took 6 wickets at bowling average of 42.00, with best figures of 4/52. A genuine tailender, Gooch failed to score in any of his first-class matches. It was for Lancashire that he made his List A debut against Gloucestershire in the 1970 Gillette Cup, his only List A appearance for the county.

The following season, having been released by Lancashire, he appeared in a single Minor Counties Championship match for Cheshire against the Lancashire Second XI, a team he had previously played for in the same competition. Five years later he joined Buckinghamshire who he represented in Minor counties cricket until 1979. While playing for Buckinghamshire, Gooch represented Minor Counties West in 4 List A matches in the 1978 Benson & Hedges Cup and Minor Counties South in 4 matches in the 1979 Benson & Hedges Cup. He only appeared once for Buckinghamshire in List A cricket, which was his final appearance in that format, against Suffolk in the 1979 Gillette Cup. In total, Gooch played 10 List A matches, taking 5 wickets at an expensive average of 63.60, with best figures of 3/51.
