= Keith Edwards (cricketer) =

English cricketer

Personal information
- Full name: John Keith Sheridan Edwards
- Born: 26 April 1951 (age 75); Brampton, Cumberland, England
- Batting: Right-handed
- Bowling: Right-arm medium

Domestic team information
- Years: Team
- 1976: Minor Counties West
- 1973–1974: Minor Counties South
- 1971–1986: Buckinghamshire

Career statistics
Competition	List A
Matches	17
Runs scored	258
Batting average	16.12
100s/50s	–/–
Top score	41
Balls bowled	–
Wickets	–
Bowling average	–
5 wickets in innings	–
10 wickets in match	–
Best bowling	–
Catches/stumpings	4/–
- Source: Cricinfo, 7 May 2011

John Keith Sheridan Edwards (born 26 August 1951) is a former English cricketer. Edwards was a right-handed batsman who bowled right-arm medium pace. He was born in Brampton, Cumberland.

Edwards made his debut for Buckinghamshire in the 1971 Minor Counties Championship against Suffolk. Edwards played Minor counties cricket for Buckinghamshire from 1971 to 1986, which included 109 Minor Counties Championship matches and 4 MCCA Knockout Trophy matches. In 1972, he made his List A debut for Buckinghamshire against Cambridgeshire in the Gillette Cup. He played 4 further List A matches for Buckinghamshire, the last coming against Suffolk in the 1979 Gillette Cup. It wasn't for Buckinghamshire that the majority of his List A appearances came for, he also played List A cricket for Minor Counties West and Minor Counties South, which accounted for 12 of his matches. He played for these teams in the 1973, 1974 and 1976 Benson & Hedges Cup's. In total, he played 17 List A matches, scoring 258 runs at a batting average of 16.12, with a high score of 41.
