= Dick Bond (cricketer) =

English cricketer

Personal information
- Full name: Richard John Bond
- Born: 8 February 1948 (age 78); Beck Row, Suffolk, England
- Batting: Right-handed
- Bowling: Right-arm medium

Domestic team information
- Years: Team
- 1981–1987: Suffolk

Career statistics
Competition	List A
Matches	1
Runs scored	27
Batting average	27.00
100s/50s	–/–
Top score	27
Balls bowled	–
Wickets	–
Bowling average	–
5 wickets in innings	–
10 wickets in match	–
Best bowling	–
Catches/stumpings	–/–
- Source: Cricinfo, 5 July 2011

Richard John Bond (born 8 February 1948) is a former English cricketer. Bond was a right-handed batsman who bowled right-arm medium pace. He was born in Beck Row, Suffolk.

Bond made his debut for Suffolk in the 1981 Minor Counties Championship against Norfolk. Bond played Minor counties cricket infrequently for Suffolk from 1981 to 1987, which included 37 Minor Counties Championship appearances and a single MCCA Knockout Trophy match. He made his only List A appearance against Derbyshire in the 1983 NatWest Trophy. In this match, he scored 27 runs before being dismissed by Steve Oldham.
