= 1998 U.S. Open =

1998 U.S. Open may refer to:

- 1998 US Open (court tennis)
- 1998 U.S. Open Cup, a soccer tournament for U.S. teams
- 1998 U.S. Open (golf), a major golf tournament
- 1998 US Open (tennis), a Grand Slam tennis tournament
