= Melvyn Pignon =

English field hockey player

Melvyn Pignon, born Melvyn Hickey, (13 July 1930 – 4 September 2016) was captain of the England women's hockey team in 1966 and 1967. She was dropped from the team following a divorce scandal in 1968.

== Selected publications ==
- Hockey for women. Nicholas Kaye, London, 1962. (2nd 1970)
