= Michael Trenwith =

English cricketer

Personal information
- Full name: Michael Oswald Trenwith
- Born: 12 February 1945 (age 81); Penzance, Cornwall, England
- Batting: Right-handed
- Bowling: Right-arm medium

Domestic team information
- Years: Team
- 1966-1983: Cornwall

Career statistics
Competition	LA
Matches	2
Runs scored	14
Batting average	14.00
100s/50s	–/–
Top score	14*
Balls bowled	144
Wickets	5
Bowling average	14.40
5 wickets in innings	–
10 wickets in match	–
Best bowling	3/51
Catches/stumpings	–/–
- Source: Cricinfo, 18 October 2010

Michael Oswald Trenwith (born 12 February 1945) is a former English cricketer. Trenwith was a right-handed batsman who bowled right-arm medium pace. He was born at Penzance, Cornwall.

Trenwith made his Minor Counties Championship debut for Cornwall in 1966 against Devon. From 1966 to 1983, he represented the county in 56 Minor Counties Championship matches, the last of which came against Berkshire.

Trenwith also represented Cornwall in 2 List A matches. These came against Oxfordshire in the 1975 Gillette Cup and Devon in the 1980 Gillette Cup. In his two List A matches, he scored 14 runs at a batting average of 14.00, with a high score of 14*. With the ball he took five wickets at a bowling average of 14.40, with best figures of 3/51.
