= Terence Cordaroy =

English cricketer

Personal information
- Full name: Terence Michael Cordaroy
- Born: 26 May 1944 (age 82); Hampstead, London, England
- Batting: Right-handed

Domestic team information
- Years: Team
- 1977–1979: Buckinghamshire
- 1968: Middlesex

Career statistics
Competition	First-class	List A
Matches	2	1
Runs scored	104	44
Batting average	34.66	44.00
100s/50s	–/1	–/–
Top score	81	44
Balls bowled	–	–
Wickets	–	–
Bowling average	–	–
5 wickets in innings	–	–
10 wickets in match	–	–
Best bowling	–	–
Catches/stumpings	1/–	–/–
- Source: Cricinfo, 5 May 2011

Terence Michael Cordaroy (born 26 May 1944) is a former English cricketer. Cordaroy was a right-handed batsman. He was born in Hampstead, London.

Cordaroy made his first-class debut for Middlesex in the 1968 County Championship against Leicestershire. It was on debut that he scored his only first-class half century, making 81 runs in the Middlesex first-innings. He played his second and final first-class match in that same season against Surrey. In his two first-class matches, he scored 104 runs at a batting average of 34.66.

He later joined Buckinghamshire, making his debut for the county in the 1977 Minor Counties Championship against Hertfordshire. Cordaroy played Minor counties cricket for Buckinghamshire from 1977 to 1979, which included 22 Minor Counties Championship matches. In 1979, he played in his only List A match, against Suffolk in the Gillette Cup. In this match he scored 44 runs before being run out.
