= Philip Ringwood =

English cricketer (1953–2024)

Philip John Ringwood (7 August 1953 – 20 October 2024) was an English cricketer. He was a right-handed batsman and a right-arm medium-pace bowler who played for Norfolk. He was born in King's Lynn.

Having represented the team in the Minor Counties Championship since 1982, Ringwood made a single List A appearance for the team, in the 1983 NatWest Trophy competition, against Glamorgan.

Ringwood continued to represent Norfolk until the 1987 Minor Counties Championship. In 2004, he made two appearances for Norfolk Over-50s in the Over-50 County Championship.

Ringwood died at home on 20 October 2024, at the age of 71.
