= Afzal Masood =

Pakistani cricketer

Personal information
- Full name: Mohammad Afzal Masood
- Born: 2 May 1952 (age 74); Lahore, Punjab, Pakistan
- Batting: Right-handed
- Bowling: Right-arm medium
- Relatives: Mohammad Akhtar (brother)

Domestic team information
- Years: Team
- 1982–1988: Ireland
- 1972/73: Pakistan International Airlines
- 1971/72: Pakistan International Airlines A
- 1971/72: Lahore
- 1970/71: Pakistan International Airlines B
- 1968/69–1970/71: Punjab University
- 1968/69–1969/70: Sargodha
- 1967/68: Lahore Reds

Career statistics
Competition	First-class	List A
Matches	25	5
Runs scored	1,101	159
Batting average	27.52	31.80
100s/50s	1/6	–/1
Top score	114	69
Balls bowled	98	102
Wickets	2	1
Bowling average	36.00	77.00
5 wickets in innings	–	–
10 wickets in match	–	–
Best bowling	1/4	1/42
Catches/stumpings	20/–	2/–
- Source: Cricinfo, 26 October 2018

Mohammad Afzal Masood (born 2 May 1952) is a former Pakistani first-class cricketer. He also represented Ireland on forty occasions.

== Cricket in Pakistan ==
Born at Lahore in May 1972, Masood is the older brother of the first-class cricketer Mohammad Akhtar. Masood made his debut in first-class cricket for Lahore Reds against Rawalpindi in at Rawalpindi in January 1968. He played two first-class matches for Sargodha in the Quaid-e-Azam Trophy in November 1968. While attending the University of the Punjab, Masood played first-class cricket for the Punjab University cricket team in five matches from December 1968 to November 1970. During this time he also played a further match for Sargodha in September 1969 in the Quaid-e-Azam Trophy, as well as appearing for Central Zone against the touring Marylebone Cricket Club in February 1969. He later played twelve first-class matches for Pakistan International Airlines (including their A and B teams) from January 1971 to April 1973. Masood played 23 first-class matches in Pakistan, scoring 1,057 runs. He made one century, a score of 114 against Karachi Greens in the 1969/70 Ayub Trophy.

== Move to Ireland ==
He came to England in 1972, in search of a contract in county cricket. Though he trialled with Northamptonshire in 1972 and 1973, he was unable to force his way into the first eleven. After briefly playing in the Birmingham League, Masood moved to Dublin to open a chain of boutique shops. He soon started playing club cricket for Phoenix Cricket Club, and scored the first double century in the Leinster League since Gerry Duffy in 1955. His performances at club level caught the eye of the Ireland selectors. He made his debut for Ireland in a List A one-day match against Northamptonshire at Northampton in the 1982 NatWest Trophy. Masood played five List A matches for Ireland from 1982–1988, scoring 159 runs at an average of 31.80, with a high score of 69. This score, which was his only List A fifty, came against Sussex in the 1983 NatWest Trophy. Masood also made two first-class appearances for Ireland, both against Scotland in 1986 and 1987. Imran Khan, playing for Sussex in this match, praised Masood's innings and attempted to persuade him to return to Pakistan to force his way into the Pakistani team. He continued to play club cricket in Ireland into the 1990s, scoring his final century in 1994.
