= Chris Swallow =

English cricketer

Personal information
- Full name: Christopher Andrew Swallow
- Born: 27 November 1981 (age 44); Ipswich, Suffolk, England
- Batting: Right-handed
- Bowling: Right-arm off break

Domestic team information
- Years: Team
- 1999–present: Suffolk

Career statistics
Competition	List A
Matches	6
Runs scored	49
Batting average	16.33
100s/50s	–/–
Top score	29*
Balls bowled	144
Wickets	1
Bowling average	167.00
5 wickets in innings	–
10 wickets in match	–
Best bowling	1/62
Catches/stumpings	1/–
- Source: Cricinfo, 4 July 2011

Christopher Andrew Swallow (born 27 December 1981) is a former English cricketer. Swallow was a right-handed batsman who bowled right-arm off break. He was born in Ipswich, Suffolk.

Swallow made his debut for Suffolk in the 1999 Minor Counties Championship against Bedfordshire. Swallow has played Minor counties cricket for Suffolk from 1999 to present, which has included 55 Minor Counties Championship appearances and 55 MCCA Knockout Trophy matches. He made his List A debut against Denmark in the 1st round of the 2002 Cheltenham & Gloucester Trophy, which was held in 2001. He made 5 further List A appearances for the county, the last of which came against Glamorgan in the 2005 Cheltenham & Gloucester Trophy. In his 6 matches, he scored 49 runs at an average of 16.33, with a high score of 29 not out. With the ball, he took just a single wicket, which came at an overall cost of 167 runs, with best figures of 1/62.
