= Paul Romaines =

English cricketer and teacher

Personal information
- Full name: Paul William Romaines
- Born: 25 December 1955 (age 70); Bishop Auckland, County Durham, England
- Batting: Right-handed
- Bowling: Right-arm off-spin

Domestic team information
- Years: Team
- 1975 to 1976: Northamptonshire
- 1977 to 1981: Durham
- 1982 to 1991: Gloucestershire
- 1984-85: Griqualand West

Career statistics
Competition	First-class	List A
Matches	173	158
Runs scored	8120	3651
Batting average	28.39	28.30
100s/50s	13/41	2/20
Top score	186	125
Balls bowled	257	0
Wickets	4	–
Bowling average	61.75	–
5 wickets in innings	0	–
10 wickets in match	0	n/a
Best bowling	3/42	–
Catches/stumpings	68/–	37/–
- Source: Cricinfo, 19 June 2019

Paul William Romaines (born 25 December 1955) is a former English first-class cricketer who is now a teacher.

== Life and career ==
Born in Bishop Auckland, County Durham, on Christmas Day 1955, Romaines played six first-class matches for Northamptonshire in 1975 and 1976 before returning to his native Durham for five seasons of Minor Counties cricket. An opening or middle-order batsman and occasional off-spinner, he then played ten seasons with Gloucestershire from 1982 to 1991, in which he played 161 first-class matches, and one season (1984–85) in South Africa for Griqualand West.

His 8120 first-class runs at an average of 28.39 included 13 hundreds. His best season was 1984 when he scored 1844 runs for Gloucestershire at 35.46. His highest score was his first century, 186 for Gloucestershire against Warwickshire in 1982.

Romaines became head of PSHE, Cricket and Assistant House Master in North Town at Clifton College in Bristol.
