= Simon Clements =

English cricketer (born 1956)

Personal information
- Full name: Simon Mark Clements
- Born: 29 April 1956 (age 70); Felixstowe, Suffolk, England
- Batting: Left-handed
- Bowling: Right-arm medium

Domestic team information
- Years: Team
- 1983: Minor Counties
- 1979: Combined Universities
- 1976–1979: Oxford University
- 1974–1998: Suffolk

Career statistics
Competition	First-class	List A
Matches	29	18
Runs scored	860	216
Batting average	20.47	12.50
100s/50s	–/4	–/1
Top score	91	59
Balls bowled	312	258
Wickets	3	5
Bowling average	68.33	33.60
5 wickets in innings	–	–
10 wickets in match	–	–
Best bowling	1/29	3/30
Catches/stumpings	18/–	1/–
- Source: Cricinfo, 13 July 2011

Simon Mark Clements (born 29 April 1956) is an English former cricketer. Clements was a left-handed batsman who bowled right-arm medium pace. He was born in Felixstowe, Suffolk.

Clements made his debut in county cricket for Suffolk in the 1974 Minor Counties Championship against Buckinghamshire. He later made his first-class debut for Oxford University against Gloucestershire. He made 28 further first-class appearances for the university, the last of which came against Cambridge University at Lord's in 1979. In his 29 first-class matches, he scored 860 runs at an average of 20.47, with a high score of 91. This score, one of four fifties he made, came against Gloucestershire on debut in 1976. An occasional bowler, he took 3 wickets at a bowling average of 68.33, with best figures of 1/29.

He still played for Suffolk while studying at Oxford, it was for Suffolk that he made his List A debut for against Sussex in the 1978 Gillette Cup. He played 4 List A matches for the Combined Universities in the 1979 Benson & Hedges Cup, and after completing his studies he returned to playing on a regular basis for Suffolk. He appeared in 12 further List A matches for the county, the last of which came against Somerset in the 1996 NatWest Trophy, as well as playing a single List A match for the Minor Counties against Sussex in the 1993 Benson & Hedges Cup. In his 13 List A appearances for Suffolk, he scored 169 runs at an average of 13.00, with a high score of 59. This score, his only fifty in List A cricket, came against Derbyshire in the 1983 NatWest Trophy. With the ball, he took 5 wickets at an average of 29.00, with best figures of 3/30. He retired from representing Suffolk at the end of the 1998 season, having played 175 Minor Counties Championship and 17 MCCA Knockout Trophy matches. He scored 9,219 runs in the Minor Counties Championship, second only to Philip Caley.
