= Philip Caley =

English cricketer

Personal information
- Full name: Philip John Caley
- Born: 18 October 1962 (age 64); Harwich, Essex, England
- Batting: Right-handed
- Bowling: Right-arm off break

Domestic team information
- Years: Team
- 1982–2009: Suffolk

Career statistics
Competition	List A
Matches	22
Runs scored	514
Batting average	32.12
100s/50s	–/–
Top score	88*
Balls bowled	558
Wickets	6
Bowling average	84.66
5 wickets in innings	–
10 wickets in match	–
Best bowling	2/24
Catches/stumpings	7/–
- Source: Cricinfo, 5 July 2011

Philip John Caley (born 18 October 1962) is a former English cricketer. Caley was a right-handed batsman who bowled right-arm off break. He was born at Harwich, Essex.

Caley made his debut for Suffolk in the 1982 Minor Counties Championship against Cambridgeshire. Caley played Minor counties cricket for Suffolk from 1981 to 2009, which included 219 Minor Counties Championship appearances (between 1981 and 2006, he missed just two fixtures) and 54 MCCA Knockout Trophy matches. He made his List A debut against Derbyshire in the 1983 NatWest Trophy. He made 22 further List A appearances, the last of which came against Glamorgan in the 2005 Cheltenham & Gloucester Trophy. In his 22 List A matches, he scored 514 runs at an average of 32.12, with a high score of 88 not out. His score, one of two half centuries he made in List A cricket, came against Somerset in the 1996 NatWest Trophy. He retired at the end of the 2009 season, ending his career as the county's leading run scorer with 9,268 runs, 49 runs ahead of Simon Clements. He is currently the Cricket Chairman of the Minor Counties Cricket Association.
