= Jeremy Morley =

English cricketer (born 1950)

Jeremy Dennis Morley (born 20 October 1950 in Newmarket, Suffolk) is an English former cricketer active from 1969 to 1976 who played for Sussex. He appeared in 72 first-class matches as a lefthanded batsman who bowled right arm medium pace and sometimes kept wicket. He scored 2,752 runs with a highest score of 127 and took no wickets. He completed 27 matches with one stumping.
