= Daniel Rock (cricketer) =

English cricketer

Personal information
- Full name: Daniel John Rock
- Born: 26 October 1981 (age 45); Ipswich, Suffolk, England
- Batting: Left-handed
- Role: Wicket-keeper

Domestic team information
- Years: Team
- 1998–2000: Suffolk

Career statistics
Competition	List A
Matches	1
Runs scored	7
Batting average	7.00
100s/50s	–/–
Top score	7
Balls bowled	–
Wickets	–
Bowling average	–
5 wickets in innings	–
10 wickets in match	–
Best bowling	–
Catches/stumpings	–/–
- Source: Cricinfo, 5 July 2011

Daniel John Rock (born 26 October 1981) is a former English cricketer. Rock is a left-handed batsman who fields as a wicket-keeper. He was born in Ipswich, Suffolk.

Rock made his debut for Suffolk in the 1998 MCCA Knockout Trophy against the Essex Cricket Board. Rock made 4 further MCCA Knockout Trophy appearances, with his last appearance coming in 2000 against Hertfordshire. He made no appearances in the Minor Counties Championship for Suffolk, but did make a single List A appearance against the Lancashire Cricket Board in the 2000 NatWest Trophy. In this match, he scored 7 runs before being run out.

He has previously played Second XI cricket for the Leicestershire, Northamptonshire and Derbyshire Second XI's.
