= Paul King (cricketer) =

English cricketer (born 1979)

Personal information
- Full name: Paul Daniel King
- Born: 25 February 1979 (age 47); Ipswich, Suffolk, England
- Batting: Right-handed
- Bowling: Right-arm fast-medium

Domestic team information
- Years: Team
- 1997–present: Suffolk

Career statistics
Competition	List A
Matches	4
Runs scored	31
Batting average	15.50
100s/50s	–/–
Top score	15*
Balls bowled	120
Wickets	2
Bowling average	68.00
5 wickets in innings	–
10 wickets in match	–
Best bowling	1/40
Catches/stumpings	2/–
- Source: Cricinfo, 5 July 2011

Paul Daniel King (born 25 February 1979) is an English cricketer. King is a right-handed batsman who bowls and right-arm fast-medium. He was born in Ipswich, Suffolk.

King made his debut for Suffolk in the 1997 Minor Counties Championship against Cambridgeshire. King has played Minor counties cricket for Suffolk from 1997 to present, which has included 53 Minor Counties Championship appearances and 23 MCCA Knockout Trophy matches. He made his List A debut against the Lancashire Cricket Board in the 2000 NatWest Trophy. He made 3 further List A appearances, the last of which came against Glamorgan in the 2005 Cheltenham & Gloucester Trophy. In his 4 List A matches, he scored 31 runs at an average of 15.50, with a high score of 15 not out. With the ball, he took 2 wickets at a bowling average of 68.00, with best figures of 1/40.
