= Gehan Mendis =

English and Sri Lankan cricketer

Personal information
- Full name: Gehan Dixon Mendis
- Born: 24 April 1955 (age 71); Colombo, Ceylon
- Batting: Right-handed
- Role: Opening batsman

Domestic team information
- Years: Team
- 1974–1985: Sussex
- 1986–1993: Lancashire

Career statistics
Competition	First-class	List A
Matches	336	313
Runs scored	21,436	8,327
Batting average	36.83	29.42
100s/50s	41/108	8/41
Top score	209*	141*
Balls bowled	177	–
Wickets	1	–
Bowling average	158	–
5 wickets in innings	0	–
10 wickets in match	0	–
Best bowling	1/65	–
Catches/stumpings	144/1	83/0
- Source: CricketArchive, 15 March 2016

Gehan Dixon Mendis (born 24 April 1955) is a former cricketer who was an opening batsman for Sussex and Lancashire between 1974 and 1993. He was part of the Lancashire team that won the 1990 Benson & Hedges Cup and 1990 NatWest Trophy. Mendis scored over 21,000 runs in his first-class career.

== Career ==
As a youngster, Mendis represented the Sussex Young Cricketers, England Schools Cricket Association, and National Association of Young Cricketers teams, and in 1974, Mendis played for Bede College as they won the British Colleges National Knockout Cup. He made his first-class debut for Sussex in a 1974 County Championship match against Worcestershire at the Central Recreation Ground, Hastings. Mendis made one run in the match. In 1977, Mendis was part of a Sussex team that lost to Ireland at Pagham; Mendis scored 42 in the first innings of the match. Mendis scored 1326 runs in the 1980 season, which was the first time that he had scored over 1000 runs in a season. During the season, Mendis scored two double centuries. In addition, he was the top scorer in the 1980 Gillette Cup with 296 runs from 4 innings, including two centuries. Mendis scored 119 against Glamorgan and 141 against Warwickshire, both at the County Ground. As a result, he was named the Sussex Cricket Society Player of the Year for 1980. In 1985, Mendis almost became the twelfth first-class cricketer to score five centuries in six innings; he was 96 not out when Sussex declared in a match against Hampshire.

After 12 seasons with Sussex, Mendis joined Lancashire for the 1986 season. During his time at Lancashire, Mendis frequently practised in the nets with Wasim Akram. In 1988, Mendis carried the bat in a match against Glamorgan at St Helen's, Swansea; Mendis scored 65* in Lancashire's second innings total of 163. In 1990, Mendis was part of the Lancashire team that won both the Benson & Hedges Cup and the NatWest Trophy. He scored 180 runs in a match against Nottinghamshire at Southport. The 1990 Natwest Trophy semi-final was played over three days, and Mendis batted throughout, scoring 121*, eventually receiving the man of the match award. In 1993, Mendis was given a benefit year by Lancashire.

Mendis also appeared in a 1989 match for the Marylebone Cricket Club (MCC) against Scotland at Glenpark.

== Personal life ==
Mendis was born in Ceylon (now Sri Lanka), and his family emigrated to the United Kingdom when he was 12; as a result, he was eligible to play for either Sri Lanka or England, although he did not make international appearances for either. As of 2015, he worked in Wilmslow, Cheshire as a teacher. His nephew Alex Mendis has played for Sussex Second XI in the Second Eleven Championship between 2005 and 2006.
