= Keith Tomlins =

English cricketer (born 1957)

Keith Patrick Tomlins (born 23 October 1957 in Kingston-upon-Thames, Surrey) is an English former cricketer.

Educated at St Benedict's School and Durham University, Tomlins made his debut for Middlesex as a right-handed middle order batsman in 1977 and earned his highest score of 146 against Oxford University in 1982. He moved to Gloucestershire in 1986, and retired the following year having scored nearly 4,000 runs, including five hundreds. After retraining as a landscape architect he played two seasons of minor county cricket for Wiltshire.

Tomlins was appointed to a coaching role with the ECB in 1998.
