= William Morton (cricketer) =

Scottish cricketer (1961–2019)

Personal information
- Born: 21 April 1961
- Died: 19 July 2019 (aged 58)
- Batting: Left-handed
- Bowling: Slow left-arm orthodox

International information
- National side: Scotland

Career statistics
| Competition | First-class | List A |
|---|---|---|
| Matches | 13 | 10 |
| Runs scored | 57 | 60 |
| Batting average | 5.70 | 12.00 |
| 100s/50s | 0/0 | 0/0 |
| Top score | 13* | 18* |
| Balls bowled | 2117 | 482 |
| Wickets | 29 | 15 |
| Bowling average | 34.58 | 22.20 |
| 5 wickets in innings | 0 | 0 |
| 10 wickets in match | 0 | 0 |
| Best bowling | 4/40 | 4/47 |
| Catches/stumpings | 11/– | 3/– |
- Source: CricketArchive, 15 August 2022

William Morton (21 April 1961 – 19 July 2019) was a Scottish cricketer who played with Warwickshire.

A slow left arm orthodox bowler, Morton made his first-class debut in 1982 for Scotland in a match against Ireland. He appeared two more times at first-class level for the Scots and his other 10 games were for Warwickshire.
