= Michael Sturgeon =

English cricketer (born 1958)

Michael Sturgeon (born 1 December 1958) was an English cricketer. He was a right-handed batsman and wicket-keeper who played for Suffolk. He was born in Bury St. Edmunds.

Sturgeon made a single List A appearance for the side, in the 1986 NatWest Trophy, against Sussex. Batting in the tailend, he scored a duck.
