= Francis Collyer =

English cricketer (born 1947)

Personal information
- Full name: Francis Edward Collyer
- Born: 4 February 1947 (age 79); Brentford, Middlesex, England
- Batting: Right-handed
- Role: Wicket-keeper

Domestic team information
- Years: Team
- 1976–1978: Minor Counties West
- 1973–1984: Minor Counties
- 1972–1979: Minor Counties South
- 1967–1969: Cambridge University
- 1967–1987: Hertfordshire

Career statistics
Competition	First-class	List A
Matches	5	58
Runs scored	96	775
Batting average	13.71	16.14
100s/50s	–/–	–/1
Top score	46	58*
Balls bowled	–	–
Wickets	–	–
Bowling average	–	–
5 wickets in innings	–	–
10 wickets in match	–	–
Best bowling	–	–
Catches/stumpings	11/1	48/4
- Source: Cricinfo, 1 October 2011

Francis Edward Collyer (born 4 February 1947) is a former English cricketer. Collyer was a right-handed batsman who fielded as a wicket-keeper. He was born at Brentford, Middlesex.

== Career ==
Collyer made his first-class debut for Cambridge University in May 1967 against Middlesex. He made a further first-class appearance for the university in 1969, against Worcestershire. His debut for Hertfordshire came also in 1967, against Bedfordshire in the Minor Counties Championship. He played Minor counties cricket for Hertfordshire from 1967 to 1987, making 176 Minor Counties Championship and eleven MCCA Knockout Trophy appearances. His List A debut came when Hertfordshire played Devon in the 1969 Gillette Cup. He made twelve further List A appearances for the county, the last of which came against Hampshire in the 1986 NatWest Trophy. In his thirteen List A appearances for Hertfordshire, he scored 187 runs at an average of 17.00, with a high score of 58 not out. Behind the stumps he took 18 catches. He also played for a variety of combined Minor Counties teams. He appeared for Minor Counties South in a List A match in the 1972 Benson & Hedges Cup against Hampshire. He made seventeen further appearances for the team, the last of which came against Glamorgan in the 1979 Benson & Hedges Cup. In his eighteen appearances for the team, he scored 180 runs at an average of 12.85. Behind the stumps he took 14 catches and made a single stumping. His first appearance for Minor Counties West came in the 1976 Benson & Hedges Cup against Gloucestershire, with Collyer playing eleven further matches for the team to 1978, scoring 170 runs at an average of 17.00 and a high score of 35 not out, while taking 7 catches.

Further appearances came for the Minor Counties cricket team, with Collyer making his debut for the team in a first-class match against the touring West Indians in 1973. Two further first-class matches for the Minor Counties followed, in 1974 against the touring Pakistanis and in 1979 against the touring Indians. He scored 95 runs in these three matches, at an average of 23.75, with a high score of 46. Behind the stumps he took 9 catches. In the 1980 Benson & Hedges Cup against Essex, Collyer played his first List A match for the team. He made fourteen further appearances in that format for the Minor Counties, the last of which came against Nottinghamshire in the 1984 Benson & Hedges Cup. In his fifteen List A appearances for the Minor Counties, he scored 238 runs at an average of 18.30, with a high score of 49, while behind the stumps he took 9 catches.
