= Timothy Catley =

English cricketer

Timothy Catley (born 15 September 1977) was an English cricketer. He was a right-handed batsman a right-arm off-break and leg-break bowler who played for Suffolk. He was born in Newmarket.

Catley, who represented the side in the Minor Counties Championship between 1999 and 2006, made a single List A appearance, in 2005, against Glamorgan. From the upper order, he scored 6 runs.

Catley represented Bury St. Edmunds in the East Anglia Premier League between 2005 and 2008, playing extensively for the team in the first two years, in which they won the league.

Catley's brothers, Russell and Matthew, also played List A cricket for Suffolk.
