= Peter Jones (cricketer, born 1935) =

English cricketer

Personal information
- Full name: Peter Henry Jones
- Born: 19 June 1935; Woolwich, London
- Died: 29 December 2007 (aged 72); Wolverhampton
- Batting: Left-handed
- Bowling: Slow left-arm orthodox
- Role: All-rounder

Domestic team information
- Years: Team
- 1953–1967: Kent
- 1978–1981: Suffolk
- FC debut: 29 July 1953 Kent v Yorkshire
- Last FC: 26 August 1967 Kent v Warwickshire
- LA debut: 22 May 1963 Kent v Sussex
- Last LA: 11 July 1981 Suffolk v Derbyshire

Career statistics
Competition	First-class	List A
Matches	141	6
Runs scored	4,196	118
Batting average	20.98	19.66
100s/50s	2/15	0/1
Top score	132	73
Balls bowled	17,098	282
Wickets	231	3
Bowling average	28.35	51.33
5 wickets in innings	6	0
10 wickets in match	1	0
Best bowling	6/41	2/39
Catches/stumpings	99/–	2/–
- Source: CricInfo, 23 February 2018

Peter Henry Jones (19 June 1935 – 29 December 2007) was an English cricketer who played first-class cricket for Kent County Cricket Club between 1953 and 1967, and then Minor Counties Championship matches for Suffolk County Cricket Club between 1971 and 1981. He also appeared in six List A matches for Suffolk between 1978 and 1981. A middle-order left-handed batsman and left-arm slow arm bowler, his debut at 18 years was the first of 141 first-class matches, all but one of which was for Kent. He scored 4,196 first-class runs and took 231 wickets. He was born at Woolwich in London in 1935.

Following career best batting and bowling figures in 1961―scoring 1,262 runs and taking 77 wickets during the season―he was awarded his county cap and established himself in the Kent team. After having his jaw broken by Fred Trueman the following season, he lost his place to the emerging Derek Underwood and his form "fell away". He retired in 1964 but returned to play three matches for Kent in 1967 when Underwood was playing for England. He then played for Suffolk in Minor Counties cricket, making 3,853 runs and taking 297 wickets in career that lasted into the 1980s, with Suffolk winning the Minor Counties Championship in 1977 and 1979. He made four one-day appearances in the Gillette Cup for the team between 1978 and 1981, adding to his two List A matches played for Kent in the early 1960s. He also played football for Hastings United.

He suffered from cancer in later life, dying at Tettenhall near Wolverhampton in December 2007 aged 72.

Suffolk teammate Bobby Cunnell wrote for the East Anglian Daily Times that Jones was "could bowl well in all sorts of conditions... He was a master of containment and I would call on him to break up a partnership if a match was running away from us. Much of our success was brought about by having three good spinners in the team and Peter's role was very important." Derek Underwood, speaking after Jones' death, described him as "genuinely slow, bowling the flighted variety of left-arm spin".
