= Gary Wallen =

English cricketer

Personal information
- Full name: Gary Wallen
- Born: 9 April 1955 (age 71); Exeter, Devon, England
- Batting: Right-handed
- Bowling: Leg break

Domestic team information
- Years: Team
- 1977–1978: Minor Counties West
- 1974–1990: Devon

Career statistics
Competition	List A
Matches	15
Runs scored	322
Batting average	23.71
100s/50s	1/–
Top score	104
Balls bowled	–
Wickets	–
Bowling average	–
5 wickets in innings	–
10 wickets in match	–
Best bowling	–
Catches/stumpings	2/–
- Source: Cricinfo, 12 February 2011

Gary Wallen (born 9 April 1955) is a former English cricketer. Wallen was a right-handed batsman who bowled leg break. He was born in Exeter, Devon.

== Minor counties cricket ==
Wallen made his debut for Devon in the 1974 Minor Counties Championship against Oxfordshire. From 1974 to 1990, he represented the county in 106 Championship matches, the last of which came against Wales Minor Counties. His debut in the MCCA Knockout Trophy came in 1983 against Buckinghamshire. From 1983 to 1990, he represented the county in 7 Trophy matches, the last of which came against Cornwall. He won the Minor Counties Championship once during his Minor counties career with Devon.

== List A cricket ==
Wallen made his debut in List A cricket for Minor Counties West in the 1977 Benson & Hedges Cup against Derbyshire. He played 4 matches for the team in 1977 and 4 in the following seasons Benson & Hedges Cup. He also played List A cricket for Devon at a time when they were permitted to take part in the domestic one-day competition, making his debut in that format for the county against Staffordshire in the 1978 Gillette Cup. He played 5 further List A matches for Devon between 1978 and 1988, the last if which came against Nottinghamshire in the 1988 NatWest Trophy. In his total of 15 List A matches, he scored 332 runs at a batting average of 23.71, with a single century high score of 104, which came against Cornwall in the 1980 Gillette Cup.
