= Braddon Green =

Australian cricketer

Personal information
- Full name: Braddon Clive Green
- Born: 18 January 1958 (age 68); Benalla, Victoria, Australia
- Batting: Right-handed
- Bowling: Right-arm medium
- Role: Batting all-rounder

Domestic team information
- Years: Team
- 1978/79–1982/83: Victoria
- 1980: Devon
- First-class debut: 16 January 1979 Victoria v South Australia
- Last First-class: 25 February 1983 Victoria v Queensland
- List A debut: 2 July 1980 Devon v Cornwall
- Last List A: 6 March 1982 Victoria v Western Australia

Career statistics
Competition	First-class	List A
Matches	12	4
Runs scored	588	150
Batting average	30.94	50.00
100s/50s	0/4	2/0
Top score	82	59
Balls bowled	479	120
Wickets	4	2
Bowling average	51.75	31.50
5 wickets in innings	0	0
10 wickets in match	0	–
Best bowling	2/16	1/8
Catches/stumpings	10/0	4/0
- Source: CricketArchive, 2 November 2011

Braddon Clive Green (born 18 January 1959 in Benalla, Victoria) is a former cricketer who captained the Australian under-19 ODI team on two occasions and played first-class cricket for Devon County Cricket Club and the Victorian cricket team.

== See also ==
- List of Victoria first-class cricketers
