= Colin Graham (English cricketer) =

English cricketer

Personal information
- Full name: Colin Charles Graham
- Born: 5 August 1957 (age 69); Wendover, Buckinghamshire, England
- Batting: Right-handed
- Bowling: Right-arm medium-fast
- Relatives: Ian Graham (brother)

Domestic team information
- Years: Team
- 1980–1991: Suffolk

Career statistics
Competition	List A
Matches	3
Runs scored	1
Batting average	1.00
100s/50s	–/–
Top score	1
Balls bowled	187
Wickets	3
Bowling average	42.00
5 wickets in innings	–
10 wickets in match	–
Best bowling	2/36
Catches/stumpings	1/–
- Source: Cricinfo, 5 July 2011

Colin Charles Graham (born 5 August 1957) is a former English cricketer. Graham was a right-handed batsman who bowled right-arm medium-fast. He was born in Wendover, Buckinghamshire.

Graham made his debut for Suffolk in the 1980 Minor Counties Championship against Buckinghamshire. Graham played Minor counties cricket infrequently for Suffolk from 1980 to 1991, which included 19 Minor Counties Championship appearances and 2 MCCA Knockout Trophy matches. He made his List A debut against Derbyshire in the 1983 NatWest Trophy. He made 2 further List A appearances, against Worcestershire in the 1984 NatWest Trophy and Lancashire in the 1985 NatWest Trophy. In his 3 List A matches, he took 3 wickets at an average of 42.00 with best figures of 2/36.

His brother, Ian, also played List A and Minor counties cricket for Suffolk.
