= Andrew Agar (cricketer) =

English cricketer

Personal information
- Full name: Andrew Charles Agar
- Born: 19 February 1956 (age 70); Sanderstead, Surrey, England
- Batting: Right-handed
- Bowling: Right-arm medium

Domestic team information
- Years: Team
- 1977–1985: Norfolk

Career statistics
Competition	List A
Matches	2
Runs scored	3
Batting average	1.50
100s/50s	–/–
Top score	3
Balls bowled	126
Wickets	2
Bowling average	33.00
5 wickets in innings	–
10 wickets in match	–
Best bowling	2/44
Catches/stumpings	1/–
- Source: Cricinfo, 4 July 2022

Andrew Charles Agar (born 19 February 1956) is an English former cricketer who played as a right-handed batsman and a right-arm medium-pace bowler for Norfolk at List A and Minor Counties level. He was born in Sanderstead.

Agar first represented Norfolk in the Minor Counties Championship in 1977, and represented the team in the league until 1983. Agar made two List A appearances between 1983 and 1984, scoring 3 runs and bowling 21 overs between the two matches.

He played in the Minor Counties Trophy until 1985.
