= Ian Graham (cricketer) =

English cricketer

Personal information
- Full name: Ian Douglas Graham
- Born: 14 March 1969 (age 57); Akrotiri, Cyprus
- Batting: Right-handed
- Bowling: Right-arm fast-medium
- Relatives: Colin Graham (brother)

Domestic team information
- Years: Team
- 1989–2001: Suffolk

Career statistics
Competition	List A
Matches	11
Runs scored	122
Batting average	11.09
100s/50s	–/–
Top score	48
Balls bowled	536
Wickets	18
Bowling average	22.05
5 wickets in innings	–
10 wickets in match	–
Best bowling	4/17
Catches/stumpings	2/–
- Source: Cricinfo, 5 July 2011

Ian Douglas Graham (born 14 March 1969) is a former English cricketer. Graham was a right-handed batsman who bowled right-arm fast-medium. He was born in Akrotiri, Cyprus.

Graham made his debut for Suffolk in the 1989 Minor Counties Championship against Cumberland. Graham played Minor counties cricket for Suffolk from 1989 to 2001, which included 62 Minor Counties Championship appearances and 23 MCCA Knockout Trophy matches. He made his List A debut against Worcestershire in the 1990 NatWest Trophy. He made 10 further List A appearances, the last of which came against Herefordshire in the 2nd round of the 2001 Cheltenham & Gloucester Trophy, which was played in 2001. In his 11 List A matches, he scored 122 runs at an average of 11.09, with a high score of 48. With the ball, he took 18 wickets at a bowling average of 22.05, with best figures of 4/17.

His brother, Colin, also played List A and Minor counties cricket for Suffolk.
