= Paul Rice (cricketer) =

English cricketer

Personal information
- Full name: Christopher Paul Edgar Rice
- Born: 22 February 1948; Exeter, Devon, England
- Died: 16 February 2013 (aged 64); Halesworth, Suffolk, England
- Batting: Left-handed

Domestic team information
- Years: Team
- 1985: Norfolk
- 1979–1982: Suffolk

Career statistics
Competition	List A
Matches	4
Runs scored	62
Batting average	15.50
100s/50s	0/0
Top score	45
Catches/stumpings	0/–
- Source: Cricinfo, 9 July 2011

Christopher Paul Edgar Rice (22 February 1948 – 16 February 2013) was an English cricketer. Rice was a left-handed batsman. He was born at Exeter, Devon.

Rice made his debut for Suffolk in the 1979 Minor Counties Championship against Buckinghamshire. Rice played Minor counties cricket for Suffolk from 1979 to 1982, which included 23 Minor Counties Championship appearances. He made his List A debut against Buckinghamshire in the 1979 Gillette Cup. He made three further List A appearances, the last of which came against Derbyshire in the 1981 NatWest Trophy. In his four List A matches, he scored 62 runs at an average of 15.50, with a high score of 45. In 1985, he made five appearances in the Minor Counties Championship for Norfolk.

He died at Halesworth, Suffolk on 16 February 2013.
