= Alan Jones (cricketer, born 1957) =

Welsh cricketer

Personal information
- Full name: Alan Lewis Jones
- Born: 1 June 1957 (age 69); Alltwen, Glamorgan, Wales
- Batting: Left-handed
- Bowling: Unknown

Domestic team information
- Years: Team
- 1988: Wales Minor Counties
- 1973–1986: Glamorgan

Career statistics
Competition	First-class	List A
Matches	160	112
Runs scored	6,548	2,047
Batting average	25.77	20.47
100s/50s	5/36	–/9
Top score	132	82
Balls bowled	95	4
Wickets	1	–
Bowling average	152.00	–
5 wickets in innings	–	–
10 wickets in match	–	–
Best bowling	1/60	–
Catches/stumpings	104/–	35/–
- Source: Cricinfo, 5 August 2012

Alan Lewis Jones (born 1 June 1957) is a former Welsh cricketer. Jones was a left-handed batsman. He was born at Alltwen, Glamorgan. Because his cricket career coincided largely with that of a different Alan Jones, also an opening batsman for Glamorgan but of longer standing and greater prominence, he was generally known by his full name of "Alan Lewis Jones".
