= Ivan Anderson =

Irish cricketer (born 1944)

Cricket information
- Batting: Right-handed
- Bowling: Right-arm off-break

International information
- National side: Ireland

Career statistics
Competition	First-class	List A
Matches	19	3
Runs scored	947	77
Batting average	37.88	25.66
100s/50s	3/1	0/0
Top score	147	37
Balls bowled	873	126
Wickets	17	0
Bowling average	14.64	–
5 wickets in innings	1	–
10 wickets in match	0	–
Best bowling	5/21	–
Catches/stumpings	9/0	0/–
- Source: CricketArchive, 27 May 2021

Ivan John Anderson (born 13 August 1944) is a former Irish cricketer. He was a right-handed batsman and a right-arm off-break bowler.

He made his debut for the Ireland cricket team against Middlesex in July 1966, and went on to play for his country 86 times in all. Of these matches, 19 had first-class status and three had List A status. He had a highest first-class score of 147, and his best bowling in first-class cricket was 5/21. He had a higher score for Ireland in a non-first-class match, scoring 198 not out against Canada at the Toronto Cricket, Skating and Curling Club in September 1973, an innings that was the highest in all of Ireland's matches until Eoin Morgan broke it in February 2007. He had 86 matches, 141 innings, 25 not out's, 3,777 runs, his average was 32.56, he got thirteen 50's, seven 100's and 48 wickets. He played for Armagh, Queens University, Waringstown and Ireland (1966–1985)
