= Michael Maranta =

Australian cricketer

Personal information
- Full name: Michael Gerard Maranta
- Born: 20 March 1961 (age 65); Brisbane, Queensland, Australia
- Batting: Right-handed
- Bowling: Left-arm medium

Domestic team information
- Years: Team
- 1982/83–1986/87: Queensland
- 1980–1981: Suffolk

Career statistics
| Competition | First-class | List A |
|---|---|---|
| Matches | 3 | 5 |
| Runs scored | 15 | 12 |
| Batting average | 7.50 | 6.00 |
| 100s/50s | –/– | –/– |
| Top score | 11 | 12 |
| Balls bowled | 258 | 246 |
| Wickets | – | 4 |
| Bowling average | – | 41.25 |
| 5 wickets in innings | – | – |
| 10 wickets in match | – | – |
| Best bowling | – | 2/40 |
| Catches/stumpings | 2/– | 2/– |
- Source: Cricinfo, 26 July 2011

Michael Gerard Maranta (born 20 March 1961) is a former Australian cricketer. Maranta was a right-handed batsman who bowled left-arm medium pace. He was born in Brisbane, Queensland.

Maranta made his debut in English county cricket for Suffolk in the 1980 Minor Counties Championship against Hertfordshire. He played Minor counties cricket for Suffolk in 1980 and 1981, making 15 Minor Counties Championship appearances. He made his List A debut for Suffolk against Derbyshire in the 1981 NatWest Trophy. In this match, he scored 12 runs before being dismissed by Barry Wood. While in England he also played Second XI cricket for Essex.

Returning to Australia, he made his first-class debut for Queensland against New South Wales in the 1982–83 Sheffield Shield. He made 2 further first-class appearances for Queensland, against Western Australia in the 1985–86 Sheffield Shield and Victoria in the 1985–86 Sheffield Shield. His 3 first-class matches were without success though, with Maranta scoring 15 runs at an average of 7.50, with a high score of 11, while with the ball he bowled 43 wicket-less overs. He made his first List A appearance for Queensland in the 1982–83 McDonald's Cup against Victoria. He made 3 further List A appearances for Queensland, the last of which came against Tasmania in the 1986–87 McDonald's Cup. In 4 List A appearances for Queensland, Maranta failed to score any runs and took just 2 wickets at a bowling average of 62.50, with best figures of 2/53.
