= Robert Flack (English cricketer) =

English cricketer (born 1943)

Robert Flack (born 7 February 1943) was an English cricketer who played for Suffolk. He was a left-handed batsman.

Flack made a single List A appearance for the side, during the 1966 Gillette Cup, against Kent. Batting in the opening order, Flack scored 46 runs in his only List A innings, finishing the top-scorer in the innings alongside fellow opening batsman Ian Prior.
