= Les McFarlane =

Jamaican-born English cricketer (1952–2019)

Personal information
- Full name: Leslie Leopold McFarlane
- Born: 19 August 1952; Portland, Surrey, Jamaica
- Died: 27 May 2019 (aged 66)
- Batting: Right-handed
- Bowling: Right-arm medium

Domestic team information
- Years: Team
- 1989–1990: Staffordshire
- 1986: Bedfordshire
- 1985: Glamorgan
- 1982–1984: Lancashire
- 1981: Bedfordshire
- 1979: Northamptonshire

Career statistics
Competition	First-class	List A
Matches	56	33
Runs scored	127	18
Batting average	5.77	3.60
100s/50s	–/–	–/–
Top score	15*	6
Balls bowled	6,920	1,323
Wickets	102	30
Bowling average	40.58	30.50
5 wickets in innings	1	–
10 wickets in match	–	–
Best bowling	6/59	4/18
Catches/stumpings	13/–	4/–
- Source: Cricinfo, 28 October 2012

Leslie Leopold McFarlane (19 August 1952 – 27 May 2019) was a Jamaican-born English cricketer. McFarlane was a right-handed batsman who bowled right-arm fast pace. He was born at Portland, Jamaica.

He is best remembered for the County Championship match between Lancashire and Warwickshire in 1982. In Warwickshire's first innings, he was hit for over 8 runs an over as Geoff Humpage and Alvin Kallicharran put on a stand of 470. In Warwickshire's second innings, he took a career best 6 for 59 as Lancashire went on to win by ten wickets.
