= Michael Scrutton =

English cricketer

Personal information
- Full name: Michael Edward Scrutton
- Born: 29 August 1945; West Derby, Liverpool, England
- Died: 26 December 2007 (aged 62); Rhyl, Flintshire, Wales
- Bowling: Right-arm medium-fast
- Role: Bowler

Domestic team information
- Years: Team
- 1966: Suffolk
- Only LA: 30 April 1966 Suffolk v Kent

Career statistics
Competition	List A
Matches	1
Runs scored	14
Batting average	14.00
100s/50s	0/0
Top score	14
Balls bowled	72
Wickets	1
Bowling average	45.00
5 wickets in innings	0
10 wickets in match	0
Best bowling	1/45
Catches/stumpings	0/–
- Source: CricketArchive, 25 September 2011

Michael Edward Scrutton (29 August 1945 – 26 December 2007) was an English cricketer. A right-arm medium-fast bowler, he played two Minor Counties Championship matches for Suffolk in 1964, before playing his only List A game against Kent in 1966, taking the wicket of future England Test player Mike Denness. He later played three matches for Singapore against Hong Kong between 1971 and 1974.
