= Bob Cunnell =

English cricketer (1942–2023)

Personal information
- Full name: Robert Edmund Cunnell
- Born: 16 July 1942; Ipswich, Suffolk, England
- Died: 12 January 2023 (aged 80)
- Batting: Right-handed
- Bowling: Right-arm off break
- Relatives: Clifford Cunnell (brother)

Domestic team information
- Years: Team
- 1960–1979: Suffolk

Career statistics
Competition	List A
Matches	4
Runs scored	55
Batting average	18.33
100s/50s	–/–
Top score	40
Balls bowled	18
Wickets	1
Bowling average	28.00
5 wickets in innings	–
10 wickets in match	–
Best bowling	1/28
Catches/stumpings	1/–
- Source: Cricinfo, 8 July 2011

Robert Edmund Cunnell (16 July 1942 – 12 January 2023) was an English cricketer. Cunnell was a right-handed batsman who bowled right-arm off break.

Cunnell made his debut for Suffolk in the 1960 Minor Counties Championship against Buckinghamshire. Cunnell played Minor counties cricket for Suffolk from 1960 to 1979, which included 116 Minor Counties Championship appearances. He made his List A debut against Kent in the 1966 Gillette Cup. He made 3 further List A appearances, the last of which came against Sussex in the 1979 Gillette Cup. In his 4 List A matches, he scored 55 runs at an average of 18.33, with a high score of 40. With the ball, he took a single wicket which came at a cost of 28 runs.

His brother, Clifford, also played List A and Minor counties cricket for Suffolk.

Bob Cunnell died from pneumonia on 12 January 2023, at the age of 80.
