= Richard Done =

Australian former cricketer

Personal information
- Full name: Richard Philip Done
- Born: 5 August 1955 (age 71); Ryde, New South Wales, Australia
- Batting: Right-handed
- Bowling: Right-arm fast-medium

Domestic team information
- Years: Team
- 1979–1980: Suffolk
- 1978/79–1985/86: New South Wales

Career statistics
Competition	First-class	List A
Matches	10	9
Runs scored	53	133
Batting average	8.83	26.60
100s/50s	–/–	–/1
Top score	13	53
Balls bowled	1,552	534
Wickets	21	14
Bowling average	41.76	19.50
5 wickets in innings	–	1
10 wickets in match	–	–
Best bowling	4/54	5/21
Catches/stumpings	7/–	2/–
- Source: Cricinfo, 27 July 2011

Richard Phillip Done (born 5 August 1955) is an Australian cricket administrator, coach and former player. He played first-class cricket for New South Wales and later held senior development roles with the International Cricket Council (ICC).

== Playing career ==
Done was a right-handed batsman who bowled right-arm fast-medium. He was born in Ryde, New South Wales.

=== Australia ===
Done made his first-class debut for New South Wales against the touring Pakistanis in 1979. He made 9 further first-class appearances for New South Wales, the last of which came against Zimbabwe, when New South Wales toured there in 1986. In his 10 first-class matches, he scored 53 runs at an average of 8.83, with a high score of 13. With the ball he took 21 wickets at a bowling average of 41.76, with best figures of 4/54. He made his List A debut for New South Wales against the touring Pakistanis in 1979. He made 5 further List A appearances for New South Wales, the last of which came against Zimbabwe, when New South Wales toured there in 1986. In 6 List A appearances for New South Wales, he scored 76 runs at an average of 38.00, with a high score of 39 not out. With the ball he took 8 wickets at an average of 22.25, with best figures of 5/21. These figures came against Zimbabwe in 1986.

=== England ===
Done had made his debut in English county cricket for Suffolk in the 1979 Minor Counties Championship against Cambridgeshire. He played Minor counties cricket for Suffolk in 1979 and 1980, making 11 Minor Counties Championship appearances. He made his List A debut for Suffolk against Buckinghamshire in the 1979 Gillette Cup. He made 2 further List A appearances for Suffolk, against Sussex in the 2nd round of the same competition, and against the same opposition in the 1980 Gillette Cup. In this 3 matches, he scored 57 runs at an average of 19.00, with a high score of 53. This score came against Sussex in the 1980 Gillette Cup, a match which Sussex won by 8 wickets. With the ball, he took 6 wickets at an average of 15.83, with best figures of 3/9.

== Coaching and administration ==
Done worked as a senior coach at the Australian Cricket Academy for nine years, including as fast bowling coach where he worked with Glenn McGrath, Brett Lee, Michael Kasprowicz and Jason Gillespie. In 2000 he joined the Queensland Academy of Sport as head cricket coach. He also coached the Australia national under-19 cricket team.

In 2004 Done took up the position of high performance manager (global development) with the International Cricket Council (ICC), overseeing the High Performance Programme.

In 2020, after 15 years with the ICC, Done was appointed as cricket operations director of USA Cricket.

== See also ==
- List of New South Wales representative cricketers
