= Robert Flack (South African cricketer) =

South African cricketer (1917–1993)

Robert Flack (5 April 1917 – 3 November 1993) was a South African cricketer who played for Eastern Province. He was born in Port Elizabeth. Flack made a single first-class appearance for the side, during the 1945–46 season, against Griqualand West. From the middle of the order, he scored 9 runs in the only innings in which he batted.
