= Michael Halliday (cricketer) =

Irish former cricketer (born 1948)

Cricket information
- Batting: Right-handed
- Bowling: Right arm off spin

International information
- National side: Ireland

Career statistics
Competition	First-class	List A
Matches	14	9
Runs scored	250	19
Batting average	25.00	3.80
100s/50s	0/0	0/0
Top score	47	8*
Balls bowled	2,565	534
Wickets	36	11
Bowling average	26.80	27.36
5 wickets in innings	1	0
10 wickets in match	0	0
Best bowling	5/39	4/22
Catches/stumpings	5/–	1/–
- Source: CricketArchive, 16 November 2022

Michael Halliday (born 1948) is an Irish former cricketer. A right-handed batsman and right-arm off spin bowler, he played 93 times for the Ireland cricket team between 1970 and 1989, including fourteen first-class matches and nine List A matches.

== Ireland career ==
=== Early days ===
born 20 August 1948 in Dublin, Republic of Ireland, Halliday first played for Ireland in 1970, making his debut against Scotland in June in a first-class match. He played four more times that year, against the Netherlands, Denmark, the Combined Services and the MCC. He next played for Ireland in September 1973, against the USA at Griffith Park in Los Angeles. 1975 saw him play a second first-class match against Scotland in addition to a match against Denmark.

=== 1976 to 1979 ===
He began to be a more regular fixture in the Ireland side in the second half of the 1970s. 1976 saw games against the MCC, the Netherlands and Scotland in addition to a match against the West Indies, his first match against Test playing opposition. 1977 saw matches against Wales, the MCC and Sussex, his first match against an English county side.

His first match of 1978 was against the MCC at Eglinton in County Londonderry. He took 7/58 in the MCC first innings, which were to remain his best bowling figures for Ireland. He also took three wickets in the second innings, taking ten wickets in a match for the first time. He also played against Denmark, Scotland and Wales that year. In 1979, he played against Surrey, FW Millet's XI, the MCC and Wales, in addition to first-class matches against Sri Lanka and Scotland. In the match against Scotland he took 5/39 in Scotland's second innings, his best bowling performance in first-class cricket.

=== 1980s ===
In 1980, after a match against the MCC, he played twice against the West Indies in Dublin. In the second match, whilst most of the Irish bowlers were expensive, Halliday took 1/29 from his eleven overs, winning the man of the match award in the process. A week later he made his List A debut, playing a Gillette Cup match against Middlesex at Lord's. He took 4/22 in the match, which remained his best List A bowling performance. He finished the year with matches against Wales and Scotland.

He continued the 1980s playing mainly against various county sides, in addition to internationals against Canada, Scotland, Wales, the West Indies, Australia, India and Pakistan. In 1986, he toured Zimbabwe with Ireland, taking eleven wickets in the match against Matabeleand, the second and final time he took ten wickets in a match for Ireland. Later in 1986, he scored 62 not out against the MCC in Dublin, his only half-century for Ireland.

His last match for Ireland was against Wales in Usk in August 1989.

== MCC career ==
Halliday played twice for the MCC. He first played for them in July 1984 against Scotland at Lord's. His next game for them came in July 1999, ten years after his last game for Ireland. He was fifty years old at the time of the second game and he showed no signs of his age, being the pick of the MCC bowlers against the Minor Counties, taking 4/46.

== Statistics ==
In all matches for Ireland, he scored 724 runs at an average of 15.08. He took 192 wickets at an average of 30.31.
