= Andrew Burch =

English cricketer

Personal information
- Full name: Andrew John Burch
- Born: 24 February 1963 (age 63); Ipswich, Suffolk, England
- Batting: Right-handed
- Role: Wicket-keeper

Domestic team information
- Years: Team
- 2001: Suffolk

Career statistics
Competition	List A
Matches	1
Runs scored	0
Batting average	–
100s/50s	–/–
Top score	–
Catches/stumpings	2/–
- Source: Cricinfo, 12 July 2022

Andrew John Burch (born 24 February 1963) was an English cricketer. He was a right-handed batsman and wicket-keeper who played for Suffolk. He was born in Ipswich.

Burch, who played club cricket for Easton, Achilles, and Copdock and Old Ipswichian Cricket Club, made a single List A appearance for Suffolk during the 2001 C&G trophy, against Essex Cricket Board. He failed to score a run in the match.
