= Colin Graham (footballer, born 1915) =

Australian rules footballer

Personal information
- Full name: Colin Johnson Graham
- Born: 12 August 1915; Swan Hill, Victoria
- Died: 21 May 2000 (aged 84); Geelong, Victoria
- Height: 185 cm (6 ft 1 in)
- Weight: 82 kg (181 lb)

Playing career^{1}
Years	Club	Games (Goals)
1939, 1941, 1944–45	Geelong	30 (16)
- ^{1} Playing statistics correct to the end of 1945.

Colin Johnson Graham (12 August 1915 – 21 May 2000) was an Australian rules footballer who played with Geelong in the Victorian Football League (VFL).
