= Robert Gofton =

English cricketer (born 1968)

Personal information
- Full name: Robert Paul Gofton
- Born: 10 September 1968 (age 58); Scarborough, Yorkshire, England
- Batting: Right-handed
- Bowling: Right-arm medium

Domestic team information
- Years: Team
- 1994–1995: Suffolk
- 1992: Leicestershire

Career statistics
Competition	First-class	List A
Matches	5	8
Runs scored	142	10
Batting average	20.28	3.33
100s/50s	–/1	–/–
Top score	75	6
Balls bowled	490	292
Wickets	6	3
Bowling average	58.00	106.66
5 wickets in innings	–	–
10 wickets in match	–	–
Best bowling	4/81	1/33
Catches/stumpings	2/–	2/–
- Source: Cricinfo, 5 July 2011

Robert Paul Gofton (born 10 September 1968) is a former English cricketer. Gofton was a right-handed batsman who bowled right-arm medium pace. He was born in Scarborough, Yorkshire.

Gofton made his first-class debut for Leicestershire against the touring Pakistanis in 1992. He made 4 further first-class appearances in 1992 for Leicestershire, the last of which came against Kent in the County Championship. In his 5 first-class matches, he scored 142 runs at an average of 20.28, with a high score of 75. This score, his only first-class half century, came against Surrey. With the ball, he took 6 wickets at a bowling average of 58.00, with best figures of 4/81. 1992 was his only season at Leicestershire, a season in which he also made his List A debut against Glamorgan in the 1992 Sunday League. He made 6 further List A appearances for Leicestershire, the last of which came against Northamptonshire in the same competition. He struggled with the ball in his 7 limited-overs appearances for the county, taking just 3 wickets at a bowling average of 86.66, with best figures of 1/33.

Gofton joined Suffolk in 1994, making his debut for the county in the Minor Counties Championship against Staffordshire. Gofton played Minor counties cricket for Suffolk from 1994 to 1995, which included 3 Minor Counties Championship appearances and a single MCCA Knockout Trophy match. He made his only List A appearance for Suffolk against Gloucestershire in the 1995 NatWest Trophy. In this match, he bowled 7 wicket-less overs for the cost of 60 runs, while with the bat he scored 6 runs before being dismissed by David Boden.
