= Paul Todd (cricketer) =

English cricketer

Personal information
- Full name: Paul Adrian Todd
- Born: 12 March 1953 (age 73); Morton, Nottinghamshire, England
- Batting: Right-handed
- Bowling: Right-arm medium

Domestic team information
- Years: Team
- 1987–1988: Glamorgan
- 1986–1987: Minor Counties
- 1985–1987: Lincolnshire
- 1972–1982: Nottinghamshire

Career statistics
Competition	First-class	List A
Matches	171	150
Runs scored	7,663	2,890
Batting average	26.79	19.79
100s/50s	9/41	2/11
Top score	178	107
Balls bowled	18	–
Wickets	–	–
Bowling average	–	–
5 wickets in innings	–	–
10 wickets in match	–	–
Best bowling	–	–
Catches/stumpings	119/–	25/–
- Source: Cricinfo, 28 October 2012

Paul Adrian Todd (born 12 March 1953) is a former English cricketer. Todd was a right-handed batsman who bowled right-arm medium pace. He was born at Morton, Nottinghamshire.
