= Matthew Catley =

English cricketer (born 1975)

Personal information
- Full name: Matthew Duncan Catley
- Born: 11 February 1975 (age 51); Huntingdon, Huntingdonshire, England
- Batting: Right-handed
- Bowling: Leg break Right-arm medium
- Relatives: Russell Catley (brother); Timothy Catley (brother)

Domestic team information
- Years: Team
- 1999–2003: Suffolk

Career statistics
Competition	List A
Matches	3
Runs scored	15
Batting average	7.50
100s/50s	–/–
Top score	9
Catches/stumpings	1/–
- Source: Cricinfo, 5 July 2011

Matthew Duncan Catley (born 11 February 1975) is a former English cricketer. Catley was a right-handed batsman who bowled both leg break and right-arm medium pace. He was born in Huntingdon, Cambridgeshire.

Catley made his debut for Suffolk in the 1999 Minor Counties Championship against Bedfordshire. Catley played Minor counties cricket for Suffolk from 1999 to 2003, which included 12 Minor Counties Championship appearances and 8 MCCA Knockout Trophy matches. He made his List A debut against Lincolnshire in the 1st round of the 2001 Cheltenham & Gloucester Trophy. He made 2 further List A appearances, against the Essex Cricket Board in the 2nd round of same competition, and Buckinghamshire in the 1st round of the 2003 Cheltenham & Gloucester Trophy, which was held in 2002. In his 3 List A matches, he scored 15 runs at an average of 7.50, with a high score of 9.

His brothers, Russell and Timothy, both played List A and Minor counties cricket for Suffolk.
