= Clifford Cunnell =

English cricketer (1944–2016)

Clifford "Cliff" James Cunnell (31 August 1944 - 5 October 2016) was an English cricketer. He was a right-handed batsman who played for Suffolk. He was born in Ipswich.

Cunnell made his Minor Counties Championship debut during the 1965 season, and with one season's exception, continued to play for the team until 1972. Cunnell made a single List A appearance for the team, during the 1966 Gillette Cup, against Kent.

Cunnell's brother, Bob, made four appearances for Suffolk over a 13-year timespan.

Cunnell died on 5 October 2016, aged 72.
