= Colin Rutterford =

English cricketer

Personal information
- Full name: Colin Rutterford
- Born: 1 August 1943 (age 83); Lakenheath, Suffolk, England
- Batting: Right-handed
- Bowling: Right-arm fast-medium

Domestic team information
- Years: Team
- 1978: Minor Counties East
- 1965–1986: Suffolk

Career statistics
Competition	List A
Matches	11
Runs scored	58
Batting average	11.60
100s/50s	–/–
Top score	28*
Balls bowled	666
Wickets	11
Bowling average	29.63
5 wickets in innings	–
10 wickets in match	–
Best bowling	3/14
Catches/stumpings	–/–
- Source: Cricinfo, 8 July 2011

Colin Rutterford (born 1 August 1943) is a former English cricketer. Rutterford was a right-handed batsman who bowled right-arm fast-medium. He was born in Lakenheath, Suffolk.

Rutterford made his debut for Suffolk in the 1965 Minor Counties Championship against Buckinghamshire. Rutterford played Minor counties cricket for Suffolk from 1965 to 1986, making 119 Minor Counties Championship appearances and 4 MCCA Knockout Trophy appearances. Rutterford took 431 wickets in the Minor Counties Championship for Suffolk, second only to Cyril Perkins, who took 779. He made his List A debut against Kent in the 1966 Gillette Cup. He made seven further List A matches for Suffolk, the last of which came against Worcestershire in the 1984 NatWest Trophy. In his eight List A matches for Suffolk, he scored 57 runs at an average of 28.50, with a high score of 22 not out. With the ball, he took 7 wickets at a bowling average of 29.28, with best figures of 3/14.

Playing for Suffolk allowed Rutterford to represent Minor Counties East in the 1978 Benson & Hedges Cup, with him making three appearances against Middlesex, Sussex and Northamptonshire. In these matches, he took 4 wickets at an average of 30.25, with best figures of 2/16.
