= Paul Douglas (cricketer) =

English cricketer (born 1971)

Personal information
- Full name: Paul Julian Douglas
- Born: 12 October 1971 (age 55); Barnstaple, Devon, England
- Batting: Right-handed
- Bowling: Right-arm fast-medium

Domestic team information
- Years: Team
- 1993: Suffolk

Career statistics
Competition	List A
Matches	1
Runs scored	2
Batting average	2.00
100s/50s	–/–
Top score	2
Balls bowled	72
Wickets	–
Bowling average	–
5 wickets in innings	–
10 wickets in match	–
Best bowling	–
Catches/stumpings	–/–
- Source: Cricinfo, 5 July 2011

Paul Julian Douglas (born 12 October 1971) is a former English cricketer. Douglas was a right-handed batsman who bowled right-arm fast-medium. He was born in Barnstaple, Devon.

Douglas made his debut for Suffolk in the 1993 Minor Counties Championship against Bedfordshire. Douglas played 3 further Minor Counties Championship matches in 1993. In what was his only season with the county, he made a single List A appearance against Essex in the 1993 NatWest Trophy. In this match, he bowled 12 wicket-less overs for the cost of 54 runs, while with the bat he scored 2 runs before being dismissed by Saleem Malik.
