= Brian Perry (cricketer) =

English cricketer (1943–2017)

Personal information
- Full name: Brian James Perry
- Born: 3 June 1943; Shrewsbury, Shropshire, England
- Died: 7 November 2017 (aged 74); Shrewsbury, Shropshire, England
- Batting: Left-handed
- Bowling: Right-arm fast-medium

Domestic team information
- Years: Team
- 1975: Minor Counties North
- 1970–1986: Shropshire

Career statistics
Competition	List A
Matches	6
Runs scored	87
Batting average	21.75
100s/50s	–/–
Top score	43
Balls bowled	186
Wickets	7
Bowling average	15.28
5 wickets in innings	–
10 wickets in match	–
Best bowling	4/39
Catches/stumpings	3/–
- Source: Cricinfo, 4 July 2011

Brian James Perry (3 June 1943 – 7 November 2017) was an English cricketer. Perry was a left-handed batsman who bowled right-arm fast-medium. He was born in Shrewsbury, Shropshire, where he was educated at Harlescott County Secondary School.

Perry made his debut for Shropshire in the 1970 Minor Counties Championship against Lincolnshire. Perry played Minor counties cricket for Shropshire from 1970 to 1986, which included 134 Minor Counties Championship appearances and 4 MCCA Knockout Trophy matches. He made his List A debut against Essex in the 1974 Gillette Cup. He made 4 further List A appearances for the county, the last of which came against Warwickshire in the 1984 NatWest Trophy. In his 5 List A matches for Shropshire, he scored 79 runs at an average of 19.75, with a high score of 43. With the ball, he took 7 wickets at a bowling average of 15.28, with best figures of 4/39.

In 1975, he played a single match for Minor Counties North against Derbyshire in the Benson & Hedges Cup. In this match, he scored 8 not out. He played club cricket for Wem.

For 26 years Perry was employed as a groundsman at Shrewsbury Town's former football ground at Gay Meadow. He died at his home in Shrewsbury on 7 November 2017 and was buried on 29 November in Shrewsbury Cemetery.
