= Russell Catley =

English cricketer (1973–2020)

Personal information
- Full name: Russell James Catley
- Born: 11 February 1973; Cambridge, Cambridgeshire, England
- Died: 1 December 2020 (aged 47); Great Shelford, Cambridgeshire, England
- Batting: Right-handed
- Bowling: Leg break
- Relatives: Matthew Catley (brother); Timothy Catley (brother)

Domestic team information
- Years: Team
- 1992–2003: Suffolk

Career statistics
Competition	List A
Matches	9
Runs scored	152
Batting average	16.88
100s/50s	–/1
Top score	65
Catches/stumpings	2/–
- Source: Cricinfo, 5 July 2011

Russell James Catley (11 May 1973 – 1 December 2020) was an English cricketer.

== Biography ==
Catley was born at Cambridge in May 1973. He was educated at Ely College, before undertaking sixth form studies at Ipswich School. From Ipswich he went up to Loughborough University, before completing his masters studies at the University of Reading. Catley made his debut for Suffolk, then captained by Ray East, in the 1992 Minor Counties Championship against Cumberland. He played Minor counties cricket for Suffolk from 1992 to 2003, which included 63 Minor Counties Championship appearances and 26 MCCA Knockout Trophy appearances. He made his List A debut against Somerset in the 1996 NatWest Trophy. He made eight further List A appearances, the last of which came against Devon in the 1st Round of the 2004 Cheltenham & Gloucester Trophy, which was held in 2003. In his nine List A matches, he scored 152 runs at an average of 16.88, with a high score of 65. This score, which was his only List A half century, came against Buckinghamshire in the 2003 Cheltenham & Gloucester Trophy. Catley is notable for being James Anderson's first competitive wicket, when playing for the Lancashire Cricket Board against Suffolk in the 2000 NatWest Trophy.

Catley was diagnosed with a brain tumor in 2004, which curtailed his cricket career. He survived for 16 years after his initial diagnosis, before succumbing to his brain tumour on 1 December 2020 at the Arthur Rank Hospice at Great Shelford, Cambridgeshire. His brothers, Matthew and Timothy, both played List A and Minor counties cricket for Suffolk. When all three brothers played against Bedfordshire in 1999, it was the first time since the Second World War that three brothers had appeared in the same team in minor counties cricket.
