= Roger Howlett =

English cricketer

Personal information
- Full name: Roger Frederick Howlett
- Born: 27 April 1948 (age 78); Bury St Edmunds, Suffolk, England
- Batting: Right-handed
- Bowling: Right-arm medium

Domestic team information
- Years: Team
- 1967–1984: Suffolk
- 1978: Minor Counties East

Career statistics
Competition	List A
Matches	6
Runs scored	102
Batting average	25.50
100s/50s	0/0
Top score	35*
Balls bowled	18
Wickets	0
Bowling average	–
5 wickets in innings	–
10 wickets in match	–
Best bowling	–
Catches/stumpings	1/–
- Source: Cricinfo, 26 July 2011

Roger Frederick Howlett (born 27 April 1948) is a former English cricketer. Howlett was a right-handed batsman who bowled right-arm medium pace. He was born in Bury St Edmunds, Suffolk.

Howlett made his debut for Suffolk in the 1967 Minor Counties Championship against Norfolk. He played Minor counties cricket for Suffolk from 1967 to 1984, which included 121 Minor Counties Championship appearances and a single MCCA Knockout Trophy match. He made his List A debut for Minor Counties East against Middlesex in the 1978 Benson & Hedges Cup. In this match, he scored 31 unbeaten runs. His List A debut for Suffolk came in the same year against Sussex in the Gillette Cup. He made 4 further List A appearances for the county, the last of which came against Worcestershire in the 1984 NatWest Trophy. In his 5 List A matches for Suffolk, he scored 71 runs at an average of 17.75, with a high score of 35 not out.
