= Justin Bishop (cricketer) =

English cricketer (born 1982)

Personal information
- Full name: Justin Edward Bishop
- Born: 4 January 1982 (age 44); Bury St Edmunds, Suffolk, England
- Nickname: Bish
- Batting: Left-handed
- Bowling: Left-arm medium-fast
- Relatives: Keith Bishop (father)

Domestic team information
- Years: Team
- 2005–present: Suffolk
- 2003: British Universities
- 2002–2004: Durham UCCE
- 2000: Suffolk
- 1999–2005: Essex

Career statistics
Competition	First-class	List A
Matches	25	23
Runs scored	433	58
Batting average	15.46	5.80
100s/50s	–/4	–/–
Top score	66	16*
Balls bowled	3,432	828
Wickets	57	26
Bowling average	39.43	28.61
5 wickets in innings	1	–
10 wickets in match	–	–
Best bowling	5/148	3/33
Catches/stumpings	7/–	4/–
- Source: Cricinfo, 6 July 2011

Justin Edward Bishop (born 4 January 1982) is an English cricketer. Bishop is a left-handed batsman and a left-arm medium-fast bowler.

Born in Bury St. Edmunds, Bishop attended County Upper School followed by Durham University. He played 25 first-class games for Essex from 1999 to 2005. Having first represented Essex in August 1999 in the CGU National League, he would later appear throughout the Division Two seasons of 1999–2002, before Essex's promotion into the First Division, playing in 23 List A one-day games in all. He made 4 first-class fifties and took 57 wickets in all. Justin Bishop now plays in the England Over 40’s side, representing them in the Over 40’s World Cup in South Africa in 2023

Bishop has since participated in the Minor Counties Championship Eastern Division for Suffolk, making his debut against Cumberland on 7 August 2005.
