= Jack van Geloven =

Personal information
- Full name: Jack van Geloven
- Born: 4 January 1934; Guiseley, Leeds, Yorkshire
- Died: 21 August 2003 (aged 69); Edinburgh, Scotland
- Batting: Right-handed
- Bowling: Right-arm medium

Career statistics
Competition	First-class	List A
Matches	247	3
Runs scored	7,522	86
Batting average	19.43	43.00
100s/50s	5/29	0/1
Top score	157*	60*
Balls bowled	31,583	161
Wickets	486	1
Bowling average	28.62	140.00
5 wickets in innings	14	0
10 wickets in match	1	0
Best bowling	7/56	1/63
Catches/stumpings	137/–	0/–
- Source: CricketArchive, 11 May 2020

Jack van Geloven (4 January 1934 – 21 August 2003) was an English first-class cricketer, who played three matches for Yorkshire County Cricket Club in 1955, and then joined Leicestershire on special registration for the 1956 season. He was a regular in the Leicestershire side for ten seasons and won his county cap in 1959.

He was born in Guiseley in Leeds where his name was registered as Jack Geloven.

== Career ==
Van Geloven was the son of a Dutch professional footballer, and played football in his youth before deciding to pursue a cricket career. A right-handed middle-order batsman and medium-paced bowler, he played 247 first-class matches, scoring 7,522 runs at a batting average of 19.43 runs per innings, taking 486 wickets at a bowling average of 28.62 runs per wicket and holding 137 catches. Throughout his time with Leicestershire the side was among the weakest in the County Championship, finishing last or second-last seven times between 1956 and 1965, and van Geloven's consistency made him more valuable than his figures might appear. He completed 1,000 runs in a season three times, with a best of 1,324 runs in 1959. But his best season overall was 1962, when he scored 1,055 runs and took exactly 100 wickets for his first, and only double. He completed the feat by taking the tenth wicket in the second innings of the last match of the season. He was the last Leicestershire player to achieve the double.

== Later years ==
After 1962, van Geloven's batting declined, and he left first-class cricket after the 1965 season. He then played for Northumberland in Minor Counties cricket until 1973, and, from 1977 to 1983, he served as a first-class umpire. During the 70s and 80s, he lived in Scarborough, North Yorkshire. After retiring from the umpiring list, van Geloven spent 12 years as the coach and groundsman at Fettes College in Edinburgh. He died in Edinburgh in August 2003, aged 69.
