= Ian Prior (cricketer) =

English cricketer (born 1930)

Ian Prior (26 July 1930 – 13 November 2007) was an English cricketer. He was a right-handed batsman and wicket-keeper. He was born in Battersea and died in Ipswich.

Prior made 3 first-class appearances for the Minor Counties. The first was against the West Indies in 1966, the second against Pakistan batting in the lower order alongside Norman McVicker, Prior scored 21 runs in the first innings and a duck in the second and finally against Australia in 1968.

Prior made a single List A appearance, for Suffolk, during the 1966 Gillette Cup, having played Minor Counties cricket since 1953 with Suffolk and Essex's Second XI. Prior continued to play for Suffolk in the Minor Counties Championship until 1968.
