= Rodney Ontong =

South Africa cricketer

Personal information
- Full name: Rodney Craig Ontong
- Born: 9 September 1955 (age 71); Johannesburg, Transvaal, South Africa
- Batting: Right-handed
- Bowling: Right-arm off-break; Right-arm fast-medium
- Role: All-rounder

Domestic team information
- Years: Team
- 1972/73–1984/85: Border
- 1975–1989: Glamorgan
- 1976/77–1977/78: Transvaal
- 1978/79–1994/95: Northern Transvaal

Career statistics
Competition	FC	List A
Matches	367	293
Runs scored	15,234	5,865
Batting average	29.46	28.19
100s/50s	20/78	2/28
Top score	204*	100*
Balls bowled	53,649	12,613
Wickets	845	261
Bowling average	31.34	32.50
5 wickets in innings	33	1
10 wickets in match	4	0
Best bowling	8/67	5/30
Catches/stumpings	179/–	91/–
- Source: CricketArchive, 15 August 2022

Rodney Craig Ontong (born 9 September 1955) is a former first-class cricketer who played for Glamorgan County Cricket Club in the UK, and for various South African teams.

Ontong was born in Johannesburg, and originally came to the UK from South Africa to pursue a football career; he had trials with Chelsea in the early 1970s. He did not impress enough to join their books, instead turning to cricket, after some success as a club cricketer in London. The South African earned a place on the MCC groundstaff and coach Len Muncer later recommended him to Glamorgan, Muncer's former county. Ontong made his Glamorgan debut against the touring Australian team at Swansea in 1975. From 1977 he was a regular in the Glamorgan team and would return to South Africa at the conclusion of each British summer to play more first-class cricket.

Early in his career he was a right-arm fast-medium pace bowler but in 1983 he took up off-spin for the first time and it became his preferred craft. Around the same time Ontong moved from the middle and lower order to the number three position. Following Mike Selvey's sudden retirement halfway into the 1984 season, Ontong became captain of Glamorgan and he finished the summer with a career best 74 wickets. He also achieved his highest first-class score that season, an innings of 204 not out against Middlesex at Swansea.

He had arguably his best season in 1985 when he won the 'Cricket Society Wetherall Award' for the 'Leading All-Rounder in English First-Class Cricket' after making 1121 runs at 48.73 and taking 64 wickets at 27.76. In a match against Nottinghamshire at Trent Bridge he took figures of 5/39 and 8/67 as well as scoring 130. He was just the second Glamorgan cricketer to achieve the feat of making a century and taking 10 wickets in a first-class match.

As Ontong had met the qualifying requirements to represent England in international cricket, he was said to have been close to being picked as the country's Test all-rounder and was also in consideration for a spot in their 1987 World Cup squad.

Over the course of his career at Glamorgan he passed 1000 runs in a season on five occasions and was their 'Player of the Year' in both 1982 and 1985. While in Wales he met and married the daughter of former Glamorgan player Jim Pressdee.

In August 1988, Ontong was badly injured in a car accident when he was travelling from Essex to Northamptonshire. The damage to his knee ended his career at Glamorgan although in the early 1990s he appeared in some matches for Northern Transvaal, a team he would go on to coach. He has also served as the Director of Coaching at Gauteng.

In April 2025, Ontong was charged with rape, sexual assault, and other crimes allegedly committed against two children.

Rodney Ontong is not related to South African Test cricketer Justin Ontong.
