= Peter Hacker (cricketer) =

English cricketer

Peter Hacker (born 16 July 1952) is an English former cricketer. He was a right-handed batsman and a left-arm medium-fast bowler.

Hacker made his County Championship debut for Nottinghamshire in 1975, having played in a tour by the Pakistanis nearly a year previous. He had represented the Second XI since 1973.

Hacker spent seven years at Nottinghamshire, between 1975 and 1981, and spent some time in the 1979/80 season in South Africa playing in the Castle Bowl for the fourth-placed Orange Free State. He found himself out of the Nottinghamshire team after the following year's action, joining Derbyshire in time for the beginning of the 1982 season.

The 1982 season was Hacker's final season of first-class cricket. Hacker was a part of the 1984 Minor Counties Championship runners-up team of Cheshire, and, in 1993, joined Lincolnshire.

Hacker was a tailend batsman for Nottinghamshire, making his way up to the lower-order for Derbyshire. Hacker took part in one match during the warm-ups for the 1975 World Cup, and the semi-finals of the 1979 and 1981 Tilcon Trophy.
