= List of Staffordshire County Cricket Club List A players =

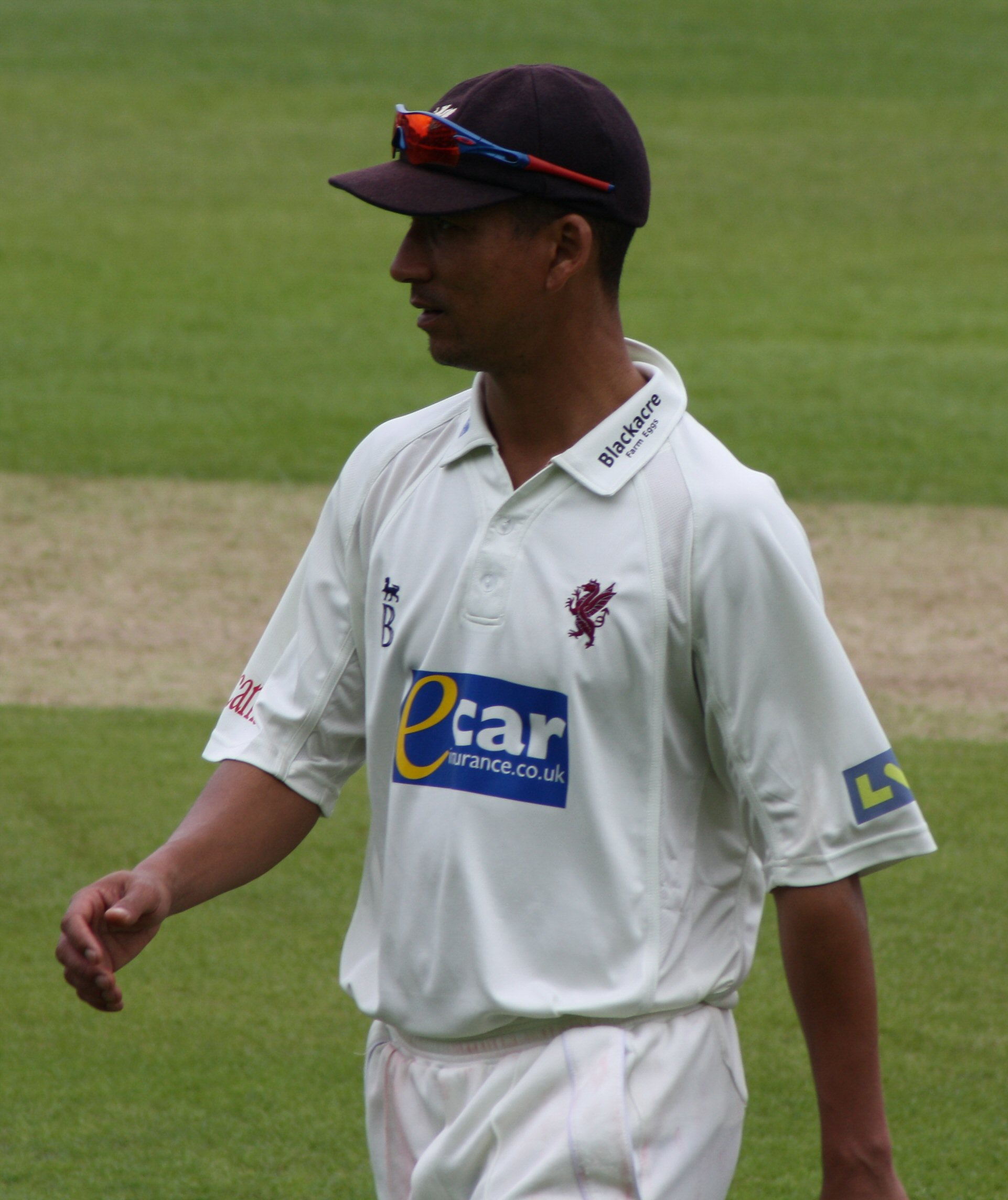
Alfonso Thomas played one match for Staffordshire in 2005, scoring 21 runs and taking 2 wickets

Staffordshire County Cricket Club was formed in 1871. The county first competed in the Minor Counties Championship in 1895. They then appeared again in 1899 and have been competing continuously ever since. They have appeared in forty List A matches, making seven Gillette Cup, twenty-five NatWest Trophy and eight Cheltenham & Gloucester Trophy appearances. The players in this list have all played at least one List A match. Staffordshire cricketers who have not represented the county in List A cricket are excluded from the list.

Players are listed in order of appearance, where players made their debut in the same match, they are ordered by batting order. Players in bold have played first-class cricket.

== Key ==
**General**

- ♠ – Captain
- † – Wicket-keeper
- **First** – Year of debut for Staffordshire
- **Last** – Year of latest match played for Staffordshire
- **Mat** – Number of matches played for Staffordshire
- **Win%** – Winning percentage

**Batting**

- **Inn** – Number of innings batted
- **NO** – Number of innings not out
- **Runs** – Runs scored in career
- **HS** – Highest score
- **100** – Centuries scored
- **50** – Half-centuries scored
- **Avg** – Runs scored per dismissal
- * – Batsman remained not out

**Bowling**

- **Balls** – Balls bowled in career
- **Wkt** – Wickets taken in career
- **BBI** – Best bowling in an innings
- **BBM** – Best bowling in a match
- **Ave** – Average runs per wicket

**Fielding**

- **Ca** – Catches taken
- **St** – Stumpings effected

== List of players ==
No.	Name	Nationality	First	Last	Mat	Runs	HS	Avg	Balls	Wkt	BBI	Ave	Ca	St
No.	Name	Nationality	First	Last	Mat	Batting			Bowling				Fielding	
1	David Hancock ♠	England	1971	1978	6	129	68	21.50	0	0	–	–	1	0
2	**Peter Gill** ♠	England	1971	1984	7	178	52	25.42	0	0	–	–	3	0
3	**Christopher Marks**	England	1971	1973	2	5	3	2.50	18	0	–	–	0	0
4	**Nasim -ul-Ghani**	Pakistan	1971	1978	5	134	85	26.80	360	1	1/46	191.00	0	0
5	John Moore	England	1971	1978	6	79	49*	15.80	0	0	–	–	0	0
6	**Michael Ikin**	England	1971	1978	7	89	47	12.71	288	6	3/13	29.50	2	0
7	**Richard Downend**	England	1971	1975	4	76	24	19.00	180	6	3/35	21.00	1	0
8	Douglas Henson ♠	England	1971	1973	3	49	28	24.50	177	4	3/16	16.75	1	0
9	**Roger de Ville**	England	1971	1973	2	2	1	1.00	42	1	1/18	42.00	0	0
10	Peter Swanwick †	England	1971	1971	1	1	1*	–	0	0	–	–	1	0
11	**Peter Timmis**	England	1971	1973	3	8	8*	4.00	174	3	2/9	25.33	0	0
12	**Peter Gibbs**	England	1973	1973	2	16	13	8.00	0	0	–	–	1	0
13	Colin Price	England	1973	1973	2	64	52	32.00	0	0	–	–	0	0
14	Brian James	England	1973	1973	2	19	19	9.50	110	3	3/35	16.66	0	0
15	Sidney Owen †	England	1973	1973	2	6	6	6.00	0	0	–	–	5	1
16	Thomas Pearsall	England	1975	1978	3	49	34	16.33	0	0	–	–	1	0
17	Leslie Lowe	England	1975	1975	1	7	7*	–	72	0	–	–	1	0
18	Michael Green †	England	1975	1978	4	49	27*	24.50	0	0	–	–	0	0
19	Keith Stride	England	1975	1978	4	1	1*	1.00	288	9	2/66	18.22	0	0
20	Richard Boothroyd	England	1975	1976	2	0	0	0.00	144	1	1/50	82.00	0	0
21	**Graham Warner**	England	1976	1986	4	127	56	31.75	0	0	–	–	1	0
22	Stanley Trafford	England	1976	1976	1	1	1	1.00	0	0	–	–	0	0
23	Derek Nicholls	England	1976	1978	3	21	13*	10.50	216	5	3/44	36.40	0	0
24	Roger Lancaster	England	1976	1976	1	4	4*	–	72	1	1/61	61.00	0	0
25	Martin Hill	England	1978	1978	2	20	14	10.00	0	0	–	–	0	0
26	Malcolm Milward	England	1978	1978	1	0	0	–	72	0	–	–	0	0
27	**Brian Gessner**	South Africa	1978	1978	1	9	9*	–	72	1	1/51	51.00	0	0
28	David Cartledge	England	1984	1995	9	124	26	13.77	114	3	2/21	29.00	2	0
29	**Brendan McArdle**	Australia	1984	1989	2	38	37	19.00	60	1	1/40	63.00	0	0
30	Nicolas Archer ♠	England	1984	1995	12	198	45	16.50	0	0	–	–	4	0
31	Christopher Clements	England	1980	1987	3	9	5	3.00	0	0	–	–	0	0
32	Paul Marshall	England	1984	1985	2	2	1	1.00	0	0	–	–	1	0
33	**Alan Griffiths** †	England	1984	1988	5	46	33	9.20	0	0	–	–	5	2
34	David Blank	England	1984	1990	7	60	23*	20.00	468	9	3/75	38.55	0	0
35	**Russell Flower**	England	1984	1988	4	20	9*	10.00	198	2	2/34	71.50	0	0
36	**Mervyn Brooker**	England	1984	1984	1	14	14*	–	72	0	–	–	0	0
37	**Keith Maguire**	England	1984	1986	3	0	0*	–	162	4	3/64	31.75	0	0
38	**Dilip Vengsarkar**	India	1985	1985	1	4	4	4.00	0	0	–	–	0	0
39	David Wenlock	England	1985	1985	1	0	0	0.00	72	0	–	–	0	0
40	**Andrew Webster**	England	1985	1988	4	34	30	8.50	288	7	4/38	25.57	0	0
41	**Steven Dean** ♠	England	1986	2002	21	302	72	14.38	0	0	–	–	12	0
42	David Banks	England	1986	1994	5	125	62*	31.25	48	2	2/49	24.50	2	0
43	**Joey Benjamin**	England	1986	1987	2	24	19	12.00	138	3	2/37	34.00	0	0
44	**Jonathan Addison**	England	1987	1991	7	36	11	7.20	18	0	–	–	0	0
45	**Dipak Patel**	New Zealand	1987	1987	1	0	0	0.00	72	2	2/26	13.00	0	0
46	Andrew Hawkins	England	1987	1987	1	7	7	7.00	66	1	1/38	38.00	1	0
47	Jonathan Waterhouse	England	1988	1996	3	76	52	25.33	0	0	–	–	2	0
48	**Philip Oliver**	England	1988	1990	3	45	28	15.00	0	0	–	–	0	0
49	Anthony Dutton	England	1988	1996	6	126	34	21.00	316	2	1/31	106.50	0	0
50	**Steve Perryman**	England	1988	1988	1	1	1*	–	72	1	1/34	34.00	0	0
51	**Harshad Patel**	England	1989	1989	1	63	63	63.00	0	0	–	–	0	0
52	Andrew Mackelworth †	England	1989	1989	1	2	2	2.00	0	0	–	–	0	0
53	**Paul Taylor**	England	1989	1990	2	14	9	7.00	144	0	–	–	0	0
54	**Steve Monkhouse**	England	1989	1989	1	11	11	11.00	72	0	–	–	1	0
55	Robert Grant	England	1989	1990	2	0	0*	–	144	0	–	–	0	0
56	**Mark Humphries** †	England	1990	2003	18	183	41*	18.30	0	0	–	–	18	1
57	Robert Dyer	England	1990	1992	2	0	0	0.00	90	0	–	–	0	0
58	**Paul Newman**	England	1991	1995	5	73	28*	24.33	298	2	1/29	98.00	0	0
59	Russell Spiers	England	1991	1994	3	22	13*	22.00	144	0	–	–	0	0
60	Gary Williams	England	1991	1991	1	7	7	7.00	72	0	–	–	0	0
61	Nigel Hackett	England	1991	1994	4	2	2*	2.00	222	4	3/45	39.00	1	0
62	Ross Salmon	England	1992	1992	1	0	0	0.00	0	0	–	–	2	0
63	Anthony Hobson	England	1992	1992	1	0	0	0.00	0	0	–	–	0	0
64	**Simon Myles**	Hong Kong	1992	1994	3	138	71	46.00	58	1	1/15	45.00	0	0
65	Derrick Page	England	1992	1992	1	6	6*	–	54	1	1/46	46.00	0	0
66	Paul Shaw	England	1993	2004	12	310	62	28.18	0	0	–	–	3	0
67	**Paul Allott**	England	1993	1993	1	3	3	3.00	72	1	1/45	45.00	0	0
68	Timothy Heap	England	1994	1995	2	7	7	7.00	108	2	2/58	40.50	0	0
69	Kaushik Patel †	England	1995	1996	2	1	1	0.50	0	0	–	–	0	0
70	**Laurie Potter**	England	1995	2001	8	211	105*	30.14	372	9	4/9	21.33	5	0
71	Peter Ridgway	England	1995	1996	2	47	47*	–	120	5	4/62	20.60	1	0
72	**Jason Brown**	England	1995	1995	1	0	0	–	72	1	1/72	72.00	0	0
73	Christopher Feltham	England	1996	1997	2	24	18	24.00	11	0	–	–	0	0
74	Denton Brock	England	1996	1999	3	25	19	12.50	124	2	1/21	42.50	0	0
75	**Alan Richardson**	England	1996	1996	3	3	3	1.00	168	1	1/48	116.00	0	0
76	Ian Stokes	England	1997	1998	2	22	18	11.00	0	0	–	–	0	0
77	David Pashley	England	1997	1997	1	5	5	5.00	0	0	–	–	0	0
78	David Womble	England	1997	2005	11	151	49	16.77	384	6	3/42	66.83	1	0
79	Simon Horsfall	England	1997	1998	2	2	2	1.00	72	1	1/28	43.00	0	0
80	**Peter Wellings**	England	1998	2000	4	54	28*	18.00	82	4	2/9	11.25	1	0
81	Mark Steele	England	1998	1998	1	24	24	24.00	0	0	–	–	0	0
82	Richard Harvey ♠	England	1998	2005	11	201	66	25.12	18	0	–	–	2	0
83	**David Boden**	England	1998	2000	4	25	12	8.33	197	1	1/43	172.00	0	0
84	Jonathan Gray	England	1999	1999	1	1	1	1.00	0	0	–	–	1	0
85	Richie Jervis	England	1999	1999	1	0	0	0.00	36	2	2/36	18.00	2	0
86	**Tim Tweats**	England	2000	2000	2	12	10	6.00	18	0	–	–	0	0
87	**Graeme Archer**	England	2000	2004	9	371	89*	53.00	0	0	–	–	4	0
88	**David Follett**	England	2000	2005	7	12	9*	–	372	16	4/17	14.00	3	0
89	Iain Carr	England	2000	2000	2	1	1	1.00	107	5	3/34	17.00	2	0
90	Andrew Jones	England	2000	2000	1	0	0*	–	60	2	2/52	26.00	0	0
91	Jamie Jervis	England	2001	2001	1	19	19	19.00	0	0	–	–	0	0
92	Greg Wright	England	2001	2001	1	1	1	1.00	0	0	–	–	0	0
93	**Ottis Gibson**	Barbados	2001	2001	3	143	102*	71.50	150	3	2/49	32.33	0	0
94	Richard Cooper	England	2001	2003	6	1	1	0.33	265	14	5/42	16.42	0	0
95	Greg Willott	England	2001	2003	2	4	4	4.00	78	3	2/47	22.66	1	0
96	Guy Bulpitt	England	2001	2004	7	4	2*	2.00	328	8	3/39	23.00	2	0
97	Michael Longmore	England	2001	2002	3	63	40	21.00	0	0	–	–	1	0
98	David Edwards	England	2001	2002	2	5	5	5.00	120	1	1/28	73.00	1	0
99	Geoffrey Crook	England	2002	2002	1	0	0	0.00	60	2	2/43	21.50	0	0
100	**Gavin Franklin**	England	2002	2003	2	102	63	51.00	0	0	–	–	2	0
101	**Mike Rindel**	South Africa	2002	2002	1	13	13	13.00	52	4	4/21	5.25	0	0
102	**Rob Bailey**	England	2002	2002	1	19	19	19.00	24	3	3/16	5.33	0	0
103	**Kim Barnett**	England	2003	2005	3	44	21	14.66	78	1	1/41	62.00	1	0
104	Robert King	England	2004	2004	1	6	6	6.00	0	0	–	–	0	0
105	**Dinesh Mongia**	India	2004	2004	1	31	31	31.00	60	2	2/42	21.00	3	0
106	Paul Goodwin †	England	2004	2005	2	34	31	17.00	0	0	–	–	4	2
107	**Imran Tahir**	Pakistan	2004	2005	2	42	41*	41.00	114	4	3/31	13.50	0	0
108	Jamie Benstead	England	2005	2005	1	5	5	5.00	0	0	–	–	1	0
109	Christopher Howell	England	2005	2005	1	16	16	16.00	0	0	–	–	0	0
110	**Peter Wilshaw**	England	2005	2005	1	20	20	20.00	0	0	–	–	1	0
111	**Alfonso Thomas**	South Africa	2005	2005	1	21	21	21.00	59	2	2/55	27.50	0	0
112	**Simon Renshaw**	England	2005	2005	1	1	1	1.00	60	0	–	–	0	0

== List A captains ==
No.	Name	First	Last	Mat	Won	Lost	Tied	Win%
1	Douglas Henson	1971	1973	3	1	2	0	33%
2	David Hancock	1975	1978	4	1	3	0	25%
3	Peter Gill	1984	1984	1	0	1	0	0%
4	Nicolas Archer	1985	1995	11	0	11	0	0%
5	Steven Dean	1996	2002	11	3	8	0	27%
6	Richard Harvey	2003	2005	3	0	3	0	0%
**Total**		1971	2005	**32**	**5**	**27**	**0**	**16%**
