= 1973 Gillette Cup =

- Administrator: Test and County Cricket Board
- Cricket format: Limited overs cricket (60 overs per innings)
- Tournament format: Knockout
- Champions: Gloucestershire (1st title)
- Participants: 22
- Matches: 21
- Most runs: 242 Peter Graves (Sussex)
- Most wickets: 11 Roger Knight (Gloucestershire)
- Official website: CricketArchive tournament page

The 1973 Gillette Cup was the eleventh Gillette Cup, an English limited overs county cricket tournament. It was held between 30 June and 1 September 1973. The tournament was won by Gloucestershire County Cricket Club who defeated Sussex County Cricket Club by 40 runs in the final at Lord's.

== Format ==
The seventeen first-class counties, were joined by five Minor Counties: Bedfordshire, Dorset, Durham, Staffordshire and Wiltshire. Teams who won in the first round progressed to the second round. The winners in the second round then progressed to the quarter-final stage. Winners from the quarter-finals then progressed to the semi-finals from which the winners then went on to the final at Lord's which was held on 1 September 1973. The tournament was notable for Durham (then a minor county) defeating Yorkshire. In doing so, Durham became the first ever minor county to beat a first class county in this competition.

=== First round ===
30 June 1973
(scorecard)

Bedfordshire; 148 all out (54.2 overs)	v	Lancashire; 275/3 (60 overs)
Tony Durley 75; Peter Lever 2/3 (5 overs)		Barry Wood 88; Graham Jarrett 1/51 (11 overs)

Lancashire won by 127 runs
Wardown Park, Luton
Umpires: Barrie Meyer & Hugo Yarnold
Player of the match: Frank Hayes (Lancashire)

30 June 1973
(scorecard)

Gloucestershire; 230/9 (60 overs)	v	Glamorgan; 196 all out (57.1 overs)
Roger Knight 75; Lawrence Williams 3/44 (12 overs)		Alan Jones 61; Tony Brown 3/29 (10.1 overs)

Gloucestershire won by 34 runs
Sophia Gardens, Cardiff
Umpires: Lloyd Budd & Henry Horton
Player of the match: Roger Knight (Gloucestershire)

30 June 1973
(scorecard)

Wiltshire; 82 all out (49.2 overs)	v	Hampshire; 86/3 (27 overs)
Paul Meehan 20; David O'Sullivan 4/13 (12 overs)		Gordon Greenidge 27; John Alford 2/29 (12 overs)

Hampshire won by 7 wickets
County Ground, Southampton
Umpires: Sam Cook & Ken Palmer
Player of the match: David O'Sullivan (Hampshire)

30 June 1973
(scorecard)

Sussex; 225/8 (60 overs)	v	Northamptonshire; 195 all out (56.9 overs)
Roger Prideaux 81; Bob Cottam 3/43 (12 overs)		David Steele 60; John Snow 3/23 (10.3 overs)

Sussex won by 30 runs
County Ground, Northampton
Umpires: David Constant & John Langridge
Player of the match: Roger Prideaux (Sussex)

30 June 1973
(scorecard)

Staffordshire; 163/9 (60 overs)	v	Dorset; 84 all out (45.3 overs)
Peter Gill 40; Derek Shackleton 4/11 (12 overs)		Timothy Hall 23; Michael Ikin 3/13 (11 overs)

Staffordshire won by 79 runs
Lichfield Road, Stone
Umpires: George Pope & Dusty Rhodes
Player of the match: Derek Shackleton (Dorset)

30 June 1973
(scorecard)

Yorkshire; 135 all out (58.4 overs)	v	Durham; 138/5 (51.3 overs)
Colin Johnson 44; Brian Lander 5/15 (11.4 overs)		Russell Inglis 47; Phil Carrick 2/32 (12 overs)

Durham won by 5 wickets
St George's Road, Harrogate
Umpires: Charlie Elliott & Arthur Jepson
Player of the match: Brian Lander (Durham)

=== Second round ===
11 July 1973
(scorecard)

Sussex; 203/9 (60 overs)	v	Derbyshire; 92 all out (47.3 overs)
Peter Graves 84*; Ian Buxton 4/27 (12 overs)		Brian Bolus 33; John Spencer 4/25 (11.3 overs)

Sussex won by 111 runs
Queen's Park, Chesterfield
Umpires: Dickie Bird & Henry Horton
Player of the match: Peter Graves (Sussex)

11 July 1973
(scorecard)

Durham; 134 all out (56.4 overs)	v	Essex; 137/3 (45.4 overs)
Derek Soakell 36; John Lever 4/30 (12 overs)		Bruce Francis 44; Alan Old 1/23 (12 overs)

Essex won by 7 wickets
Ropery Lane, Chester-le-Street
Umpires: Arthur Jepson & George Pope
Player of the match: John Lever (Essex)

11 July 1973
(scorecard)

Gloucestershire; 169/7 (60 overs)	v	Surrey; 150 all out (54.1 overs)
David Shepherd 72*; Geoff Arnold 4/38 (12 overs)		Younis Ahmed 33; Mike Procter 3/21 (9.1 overs)

Gloucestershire won by 19 runs
Ashley Down Ground, Bristol
Umpires: David Constant & Ray Julian
Player of the match: David Shepherd (Gloucestershire)

11 July 1973
(scorecard)

Hampshire; 205 all out (58.5 overs)	v	Kent; 206/2 (52.5 overs)
Gordon Greenidge 100; John Shepherd 4/43 (12 overs)		Brian Luckhurst 114*; David O'Sullivan 1/32 (12 overs)

Kent won by 8 wickets
St Lawrence Ground, Canterbury
Umpires: Ron Aspinall & Lloyd Budd
Player of the match: Brian Luckhurst (Kent)

11 July 1973
(scorecard)

Staffordshire; 137 all out (58.5 overs)	v	Lancashire; 141/4 (35.2 overs)
Colin Price 52; Peter Lee 3/24 (11 overs)		David Lloyd 85*; Brian James 3/35 (10.2 overs)

Lancashire won by 6 wickets
Old Trafford, Manchester
Umpires: Bill Alley & Sam Cook
Player of the match: David Lloyd (Lancashire)

11 July 1973
(scorecard)

Nottinghamshire; 162/7 (60 overs)	v	Middlesex; 165/6 (54 overs)
Garfield Sobers 75*; Keith Jones 2/20 (12 overs)		John Murray 36; Carlton Forbes 2/20 (12 overs)

Middlesex won by 4 wickets
Lord's, London
Umpires: Alan Whitehead & Hugo Yarnold
Player of the match: Garfield Sobers (Nottinghamshire)

11 July 1973
(scorecard)

Somerset; 212 all out (59.1 overs)	v	Leicestershire; 215/8 (59 overs)
Peter Robinson 67; Ken Higgs 4/27 (11.1 overs)		Chris Balderstone 119*; Allan Jones 2/45 (12 overs)

Leicestershire won by 2 wickets
County Ground, Taunton
Umpires: Jack Crapp & David Evans
Player of the match: Chris Balderstone (Leicestershire)

11 July 1973
(scorecard)

Worcestershire; 213/9 (60 overs)	v	Warwickshire; 200 all out (58.3 overs)
Basil D'Oliveira 54; Bob Willis 4/19 (12 overs)		Dennis Amiss 54; Brian Brain 4/31 (12 overs)

Worcestershire won by 13 runs
Edgbaston, Birmingham
Umpires: Charlie Elliott & Eddie Phillipson
Player of the match: Brian Brain (Worcestershire)

=== Quarter-finals ===
1 August 1973
(scorecard)

Gloucestershire; 236/9 (60 overs)	v	Essex; 206 all out (56.5 overs)
Roger Knight 60; Brian Edmeades 4/71 (12 overs)		Keith Fletcher 45; Jack Davey 4/35 (10.5 overs)

Gloucestershire won by 30 runs
County Ground, Chelmsford
Umpires: Eddie Phillipson & Alan Whitehead
Player of the match: Roger Knight (Gloucestershire)

1, 2 August 1973
(scorecard)

Lancashire; 224/6 (60 overs)	v	Middlesex; 225/6 (59 overs)
Harry Pilling 90; Dennis Marriott 3/42 (12 overs)		Mike Smith 90; Jack Simmons 3/46 (12 overs)

Middlesex won by 4 wickets
Lord's, London
Umpires: Ray Julian & Cec Pepper
Player of the match: Mike Smith (Middlesex)

- Match was scheduled for one day but extended to two.

1 August 1973
(scorecard)

Sussex; 263/6 (60 overs)	v	Kent; 135 all out (43.1 overs)
Roger Prideaux 79; Derek Underwood 2/59 (12 overs)		Graham Johnson 65; Tony Buss 3/26 (12 overs)

Sussex won by 128 runs
County Ground, Hove
Umpires: Barrie Meyer & Peter Wight
Player of the match: Roger Prideaux (Sussex)

1 August 1973
(scorecard)

Worcestershire; 202/9 (60 overs)	v	Leicestershire; 146 all out (53.5 overs)
Basil D'Oliveira 51; Ray Illingworth 3/15 (12 overs)		Brian Davison 61*; Norman Gifford 3/13 (12 overs)

Worcestershire won by 56 runs
New Road, Worcester
Umpires: Bill Alley & Jack Crapp
Player of the match: Basil D'Oliveira (Worcestershire)

=== Semi-finals ===
15 August 1973
(scorecard)

Sussex; 174/8 (60 overs)	v	Middlesex; 169 all out (59.1 overs)
Tony Greig 61; Phil Edmonds 2/18 (12 overs)		Fred Titmus 41; Tony Greig 4/27 (11.1 overs)

Sussex won by 5 runs
Lord's, London
Umpires: David Evans & Tom Spencer
Player of the match: Tony Greig (Sussex)

15 August 1973
(scorecard)

Gloucestershire; 243/8 (60 overs)	v	Worcestershire; 238/9 (60 overs)
Mike Procter 101; Basil D'Oliveira 2/36 (12 overs)		Glenn Turner 109; Mike Procter 3/31 (12 overs)

Gloucestershire won by 5 runs
New Road, Worcester
Umpires: John Langridge & Ken Palmer
Player of the match: Mike Procter (Gloucestershire)

=== Final ===
1 September 1973
(scorecard)

Gloucestershire; 243/8 (60 overs)	v	Sussex; 208 all out (56.5 overs)
Mike Procter 94; John Snow 3/31 (12 overs)		Geoff Greenidge 76; Roger Knight 4/47 (10 overs)

Gloucestershire won by 40 runs
Lord's, London
Umpires: Arthur Fagg & Tom Spencer
Player of the match: Tony Brown (Gloucestershire)
