= Jack Davey (cricketer) =

English cricketer (born 1944)

Personal information
- Full name: Jack Davey
- Born: 4 September 1944 (age 82); Tavistock, Devon, England
- Batting: Left-handed
- Bowling: Left-arm fast-medium

Domestic team information
- Years: Team
- 1964–1965: Devon
- 1966–1978: Gloucestershire
- 1981–1985: Devon

Career statistics
Competition	First-class	List A
Matches	175	150
Runs scored	918	135
Batting average	7.77	5.00
100s/50s	0/1	0/0
Top score	53*	16
Balls bowled	24,350	7,157
Wickets	411	173
Bowling average	28.51	26.26
5 wickets in innings	9	0
10 wickets in match	0	0
Best bowling	6/95	4/11
Catches/stumpings	32/–	17/–
- Source: Cricinfo, 7 June 2011

Jack Davey (born 4 September 1944) is a former English cricketer. Davey was a left-handed batsman who bowled left-arm fast-medium. An opening bowler, Davey had a successful career with Gloucestershire County Cricket Club which spanned from the 1966 season to the 1978 season. His name sometimes appeared in reports and on scorecards as J.J. Davey, although this was not accurate: the second initial was a mischievous creation by his county captain Tony Brown and the writer Alan Gibson, whose campaign to embellish Davey's name even extended to the production of a commemorative tie, in Davey's testimonial season, with "J.J?" on it.

== Early life ==
Born in Tavistock, Davey was the son of an auctioneer's clerk who played and administered club cricket for over 30 years, as well as playing for Devon. He was educated at Tavistock Grammar School and Tavistock Comprehensive School, where when playing cricket for the school, as well as in his early club cricket days, Davey wanted to be a slow left-arm bowler. It wasn't until when he was playing for his village club side, Milton Abbot, that the team found itself short of a seam bowler. Davey, who at the time was 14, was given the new ball. He performed so well in his new role, that for the rest of his career he would become a seam bowler.

Upon leaving school, he began an apprenticeship as a compositor for the Tavistock Gazette. After performing well in club cricket, he later made his debut in county cricket for Devon in the 1964 Minor Counties Championship against Cornwall. Davey played Minor counties cricket for Devon on four more occasions in 1965.

== Gloucestershire ==
It was in 1965 that he came to Gloucestershire's attention, appearing for the county Second XI on a couple of occasions in that year. The following season, Davey made his first-class debut for the county against Cambridge University, although he spent the majority of 1966 in the county Second XI. 1967 saw Davey establish himself in the Gloucestershire team, making regular first-class appearances, as well as making his List A debut against Lancashire in the Gillette Cup. His first full season playing for Gloucestershire was a successful one, with his left-arm bowling taking 60 wickets at a bowling average of 27.65. He took his first five wicket haul, one of two that season, against Surrey when he took 5/40. However, it was in that season that he took his career best bowling figures, 6/95 against Nottinghamshire.

Standing over 6 feet tall, Davey was an opening bowler, often sharing the new ball with South Africa Test cricketer Mike Procter, who had joined Gloucestershire in the season before Davey's debut. With South Africa being banned from international cricket due to their governments apartheid policies, this ended Procter's international career, thus allowing him and Davey to form a highly productive partnership over the next decade. Throughout the 1970s, Davey played an important support role for Procter, taking over 40 wickets in 1971 and 1972, plus chipping in with 26 in 1973. Davey was just as successful in the limited-overs arena. He was played in the famous semi-final of the 1971 Gillette Cup, which didn't end until five-to-nine, with Davey bowling 11 overs for the cost of 22 runs. Despite this, Lancashire won the match and proceeded to the final. He considers this the bowling performance he is most proud of. Davey made a notable performance in the semi-final of the 1972 Benson & Hedges Cup against Yorkshire, when he bowled 9 overs, conceding just 6 runs. 7 of his maiden overs came with Geoffrey Boycott at one end, a batsman though not known for his fast scoring rate. He won the 1973 Gillette Cup with Gloucestershire, playing through the majority of the tournament with painkilling injections in both his knees, a fact kept quiet among his contemporaries in cricket. The lumps of fat under both his kneecaps were removed in an operation, which caused Davey to miss a large part of the 1974 season. He consistently averaged in the mid to low twenties with the ball in hand between over 20 wickets for 4 straight seasons from 1972 to 1974.

His most successful first-class season was in 1975, in which he took 64 wickets at an average of 26.26, and which included his highest quantity of five wicket hauls, claiming 5 of them in 20 matches. However, after the 1976 season, in which his bowling performances dipped in both forms of the game when compared to preceding seasons, he played less often for Gloucestershire thereafter. With his time at the county coming to an end, Davey had his benefit year in 1978, alongside teammate and close friend David Shepherd. He did though make 15 first-class appearances in his last season in 1978, taking 30 wickets at a respectable average of exactly 30. His final first-class match came against Yorkshire at North Marine Road Ground, Scarborough. This was his 175th first-class match for Gloucestershire. His career with Gloucestershire spanned 13 seasons, during which time he took 411 wickets at an average of 28.51, with Davey taking a five wicket haul on 9 occasions, although he never took a ten wicket haul in a match. Davey generally batted at number 11 in the Gloucestershire batting order, and was well known as a blocker. An example of his defensive nature came against Glamorgan on the last day of the 1973 season. Davey came to the crease with Gloucestershire 210/9, still requiring 57 runs to win. Davey scored 17 runs off 94 balls, supporting number 10 John Mortimore, who scored the majority of the runs in their partnership as Gloucestershire went on to win. He scored 918 runs during his first-class career, at a batting average of 7.77. He made a solitary half century, which came against Glamorgan in 1977, which was his only first-class appearance that season. His final season also saw him play 9 List A matches, the last coming against Lancashire in the 2nd round of the 1978 Gillette Cup. His List A career with the county spanned 12 season, during which time he took 170 wickets at an average of 26.21, with best figures of 4/11.

== Later life ==
With the end of his career with Gloucestershire, Davey embarked on new pursuits. In an interview for the Wisden Cricketers' Almanack in 1975, he stated his desire to become a heavy goods vehicle driver on a full-time basis, having worked as one for the winters of 1973 and 1974 after acquiring his licence. In previous winters he had worked as a carpet salesman in Bristol, where he had made his home with his wife, Melora, who was originally from Princetown, Devon. The end of his professional cricketing career did not bring an end to his cricketing endeavours. He appeared for Devon in a single Minor Counties Championship match in 1981 against Cornwall, as well as making 2 List A appearances in the 1983 NatWest Trophy against Leicestershire and Warwickshire in the 1985 NatWest Trophy. He later ran the Court Farm pub in Abbotskerswell for many years.

Davey appeared in the 1997 documentary Grace & Favour: A Portrait of Gloucestershire County Cricket Club, alongside former teammates Zaheer Abbas and David Allen, and later Gloucestershire player Mark Alleyne. In 2009, he appeared in a short comedy film entitled Dow Jones, where he played the part of Dow Jones' girlfriend. When his lifelong friend and former teammate David Shepherd died, Davey described him as being "like a brother". At the time of Shepherd's funeral, Davey was semi-retired and living in Topsham, Devon.
