= Boothroyd =

Boothroyd may refer to:

== People ==
- Aidy Boothroyd (born 1971), English former footballer and the manager of the England national under-21 football team
- Allen Boothroyd (1943–2020), industrial designer
- Basil Boothroyd (1910–1988), English humourist
- Benjamin Boothroyd (1768–1836), English clergyman and Hebrew scholar
- Betty Boothroyd (1929–2023), British politician who was the first female Speaker of the House of Commons
- Clement G. Boothroyd (died 1952), English First World War flying ace
- David Boothroyd, author of The History of British Political Parties
- Eric Boothroyd (1927–2022), English international motorcycle speedway rider
- Fin Boothroyd (born 1999), Canadian field hockey player
- Geoffrey Boothroyd (1925–2001), English firearms expert and author
- Giles Boothroyd (born 1969), English rugby league footballer
- John C. Boothroyd, Canadian microbiologist
- Richard Boothroyd (born 1944), English cricketer
- Boothroyd Fairclough (c. 1825–1911), American actor

== Fictional characters ==
- Q (James Bond), the quartermaster in the James Bond books and movies, identified as Major Boothroyd

== Other uses ==
- Boothroyd, British Columbia, Canada, a settlement
  - Boothroyd First Nation, a First Nations band government in British Columbia, Canada
- Boothroyd, West Yorkshire, England, a village
