= Robert Dyer =

Robert Dyer may refer to:

- Robert Dyer (clergyman) (1808–1887), Canadian minister and educator
- Robert Dyer (Australian cricketer) (1860–1950), Australian cricketer
- Robert Allen Dyer (1900–1987), South African botanist and taxonomist
- Bob Dyer (Robert Neal Dyer, 1909–1984), American-born vaudeville entertainer, radio personality and quiz show host
- Bobby Dyer (politician) (Robert M. Dyer, born 1950), mayor of Virginia Beach, Virginia
- Robert Dyer (English cricketer) (born 1959), English cricketer
- Robert Dyer (bomber), convicted in a 2001 extortion case in England
- Robert William Dyer (1859–1939), solicitor, judge and mayor of Hamilton, New Zealand

== See also ==
- Robert Dwyer (disambiguation)
