= 1973 English cricket season =

The 1973 English cricket season was the 74th in which the County Championship had been an official competition. Hampshire win the championship and Kent dominated the limited overs tournaments.

== Honours ==
- County Championship - Hampshire
- Gillette Cup - Gloucestershire
- Sunday League - Kent
- Benson & Hedges Cup - Kent
- Minor Counties Championship - Shropshire
- Second XI Championship - Essex II
- Wisden - Keith Boyce, Bevan Congdon, Keith Fletcher, Roy Fredericks, Peter Sainsbury

== Test series ==
1973 saw New Zealand and West Indies tour England. Whilst beating New Zealand 2–0 in the three match series, England went down 2–0 to the West Indies, losing the final test by an innings and 226 runs.

== Leading batsmen ==
1973 English cricket season – leading batsmen by average
Name	Innings	Runs	Highest	Average	100s
Glenn Turner	44	2416	153*	67.11	9
Maurice Foster	20	828	127	63.69	1
Geoffrey Boycott	30	1527	141*	63.62	5
Rohan Kanhai	22	1129	230*	62.72	4
Mike Procter	29	1475	152	61.45	6

1973 English cricket season – leading batsmen by aggregate
Name	Innings	Runs	Highest	Average	100s
Glenn Turner	44	2416	153*	67.11	9
John Jameson	43	1948	168	48.70	5
Michael Smith	41	1677	116	45.32	2
Gordon Greenidge	38	1656	196*	48.70	5
Pasty Harris	40	1655	201*	43.55	4

== Leading bowlers ==
1973 English cricket season – leading bowlers by average
Name	Balls	Maidens	Runs	Wickets	Average
Tom Cartwright	4864	349	1410	89	15.84
Peter Sainsbury	3295	253	945	53	17.83
Bishan Bedi	5186	308	1884	105	17.94
Peter Lee	4443	182	1901	101	18.82
Tony Nicholson	3323	165	1232	65	18.95

1973 English cricket season – leading bowlers by aggregate
Name	Balls	Maidens	Runs	Wickets	Average
Bishan Bedi	5186	308	1884	105	17.94
Peter Lee	4443	182	1901	101	18.82
Robin Jackman	3912	141	1888	92	20.52
John Shepherd	4803	229	2054	92	22.32
Tom Cartwright	4864	349	1410	89	15.84

== Annual reviews ==
- Playfair Cricket Annual 1974
- Wisden Cricketers' Almanack 1974
