= Brian Lander =

English cricketer (born 1942)

Personal information
- Full name: Brian Richard Lander
- Born: 9 January 1942 (age 84); Bishop Auckland, County Durham, England
- Batting: Right-handed
- Bowling: Right-arm medium

Domestic team information
- Years: Team
- 1976–1978: Minor Counties East
- 1973–1974: Minor Counties North
- 1963–1986: Durham

Career statistics
Competition	List A
Matches	26
Runs scored	122
Batting average	6.77
100s/50s	–/–
Top score	28
Balls bowled	1,402
Wickets	25
Bowling average	34.36
5 wickets in innings	1
10 wickets in match	–
Best bowling	5/15
Catches/stumpings	2/–
- Source: Cricinfo, 7 August 2011

Brian Richard Lander (born 9 January 1942) is a former English cricketer. Lander was a right-handed batsman who bowled right-arm medium pace.

== Early life ==
Lander was born in Bishop Auckland, County Durham.

== Career ==
Lander made his debut for Durham against Staffordshire in the 1963 Minor Counties Championship. He played Minor counties cricket for Durham from 1963 to 1986, making 90 Minor Counties Championship appearances and a single MCCA Knockout Trophy appearance.

He made his List A debut against Oxfordshire in the 1972 Gillette Cup. He made 10 further List A appearances for Durham, the last of which came against Surrey in the 1982 NatWest Trophy. In his 11 List A matches for Durham, he took 14 wickets at an average of 27.71, with best figures of 5/15. These figures, his only five wicket haul in List A cricket, came against Yorkshire in the 1973 Gillette Cup, when he captained Durham to victory by 5 wickets. It was the first time a minor county had beaten one of the 17 senior counties in the Gillette Cup. With the bat, he scored 73 runs at a batting average of 12.16, with a high score of 28. He captained Durham from 1973 to 1979.

He also played List A cricket for Minor Counties North, who he made his debut for against Derbyshire in the 1973 Benson & Hedges Cup. He made two further List A appearances for the team, both in the 1974 Benson & Hedges Cup against Yorkshire and Lancashire, taking just a single wicket in these matches. It was though for Minor Counties East that he made most of his List A appearances for, debuting for the team in the 1976 Benson & Hedges Cup against Nottinghamshire. He made 11 further List A appearances for the team, the last of which came against Northamptonshire in the 1978 Benson & Hedges Cup. In his 12 matches for the team, he took 10 wickets at an average of 42.90, with best figures of 3/39.
