= Pashley =

Pashley is a surname, and may refer to:

- Anne Pashley (1935–2016), British sprinter and opera singer
- Cecil Pashley (1891–1969), British aviator
- David Pashley (born 1972), English cricketer
- Jacqueline Pashley (born 1979), Dutch cricketer
- John Pashley (1933–2015), Australian rugby union player
- Robert Pashley (1805–1859), English traveler and economist
- Terry Pashley (born 1956), English footballer

== See also ==
- Pashley Cycles, British bicycle manufacturer
- Pashley Manor, historic house in East Sussex, England
