= Ikin =

Ikin is a surname. People bearing the name include:

- Ben Ikin (born 1977), Australian rugby player
- David Ikin (born 1946), English football player
- Humphrey Ikin (born 1957), New Zealander furniture designer
- Jack Ikin (1918–1984), English cricket player for Lancashire, father of Michael Ikin
- Michael Ikin (born 1946), English cricket player for Staffordshire, son of Jack Ikin
- Van Ikin (born 1951), Australian author
