= 1978 Gillette Cup =

- Administrator: Test and County Cricket Board
- Cricket format: Limited overs cricket (60 overs per innings)
- Tournament format: Knockout
- Champions: Sussex (3rd title)
- Participants: 22
- Matches: 21
- Most runs: 361 Viv Richards (Somerset)
- Most wickets: 12 Geoff Arnold (Sussex)
- Official website: CricketArchive tournament page

The 1978 Gillette Cup was the sixteenth Gillette Cup, an English limited overs county cricket tournament. It was held between 5 July and 2 September 1978. The tournament was won by Sussex County Cricket Club who defeated Somerset County Cricket Club by 5 wickets in the final at Lord's.

== Format ==
The seventeen first-class counties, were joined by five Minor Counties: Devon, Durham, Shropshire, Staffordshire and Suffolk. Teams who won in the first round progressed to the second round. The winners in the second round then progressed to the quarter-final stage. Winners from the quarter-finals then progressed to the semi-finals from which the winners then went on to the final at Lord's which was held on 2 September 1978.

=== First round ===
5 July 1978
(scorecard)

Devon; 205/8 (60 overs)	v	Staffordshire; 208/6 (58 overs)
Barrie Matthews 66; Derek Nicholls 3/44 (12 overs)		Peter Gill 52; Martyn Goulding 2/38 (12 overs)

Staffordshire won by 4 wickets
Recreation Ground, Torquay
Umpires: David Halfyard & Alan Whitehead
Player of the match: John Moore (Staffordshire)

5 July 1978
(scorecard)

Shropshire; 148/9 (60 overs)	v	Surrey; 149/6 (53.4 overs)
Doug Slade 54; Pat Pocock 2/20 (12 overs)		John Edrich 72*; Peter Ranells 3/38 (10.4 overs)

Surrey won by 4 wickets
Orleton Park, Wellington
Umpires: Dusty Rhodes & Tommy Wilson
Player of the match: John Edrich (Surrey)

5 July 1978
(scorecard)

Warwickshire; 292/5 (60 overs)	v	Somerset; 297/4 (57.1 overs)
John Whitehouse 94; Dennis Breakwell 2/51 (12 overs)		Viv Richards 139*; Bob Willis 1/43 (12 overs)

Somerset won by 6 wickets
County Ground, Taunton
Umpires: Jack Crapp & David Evans
Player of the match: Viv Richards (Somerset)

5 July 1978
(scorecard)

Suffolk; 101 all out (39.1 overs)	v	Sussex; 102/4 (33.1 overs)
Stuart Westley 25*; John Spencer 3/11 (3.5 overs)		Paul Parker 53; Richard Robinson 2/19 (5.1 overs)

Sussex won by 6 wickets
County Ground, Hove
Umpires: Sam Cook & Don Oslear
Player of the match: Paul Parker (Sussex)

5, 6 July 1978
(scorecard)

Derbyshire; 158/9 (60 overs)	v	Worcestershire; 153 all out (59.4 overs)
Geoff Miller 59*; James Cumbes 3/23 (12 overs)		Phil Neale 32; Eddie Barlow 5/30 (12 overs)

Derbyshire won by 5 runs
New Road, Worcester
Umpires: Fred Goodall & Ray Julian
Player of the match: Eddie Barlow (Derbyshire)

- Match was scheduled for one day but extended to two.

5, 6, 7 July 1978
(scorecard)

Yorkshire; 249/6 (45 overs)	v	Durham; 136/7 (45 overs)
John Hampshire 110 (96); Peter Kippax 3/64 (11 overs)		Neil Riddell 52 (103); Chris Old 4/9 (12 overs)

Yorkshire won by 113 runs
Acklam Park, Middlesbrough
Umpires: Ron Aspinall & Jack van Geloven
Player of the match: John Hampshire (Yorkshire)

- Match was scheduled for one day but extended to three. Match was reduced to 45 overs per side.

=== Second round ===
19, 20 July 1978
(scorecard)

Middlesex; 199 all out (59.2 overs)	v	Derbyshire; 166 all out (54 overs)
Ian Gould 58; Eddie Barlow 3/47 (11.2 overs)		Alan Hill 72; Phil Edmonds 2/17 (12 overs)

Middlesex won by 33 runs
County Ground, Derby
Umpires: Arthur Jepson & John Langridge
Player of the match: Alan Hill (Derbyshire)

- Match was scheduled for one day but extended to two.

19, 20 July 1978
(scorecard)

Essex; 268/9 (60 overs)	v	Surrey; 196 all out (58.1 overs)
Mike Denness 71; Hugh Wilson 3/59 (12 overs)		Roger Knight 34; John Lever 4/25 (11.1 overs)

Essex won by 72 runs
Castle Park Cricket Ground, Colchester
Umpires: Ron Aspinall & Cec Pepper
Player of the match: Mike Denness (Essex)

- Match was scheduled for one day but extended to two.

19, 20 July 1978
(scorecard)

Somerset; 330/4 (60 overs)	v	Glamorgan; 260 all out (60 overs)
Peter Denning 145; Peter Swart 2/71 (12 overs)		Rodney Ontong 64; Keith Jennings 3/51 (12 overs)

Somerset won by 70 runs
Sophia Gardens, Cardiff
Umpires: Eddie Phillipson & Dusty Rhodes
Player of the match: Peter Denning (Somerset)

- Match was scheduled for one day but extended to two.

19, 20 July 1978
(scorecard)

Gloucestershire; 266/5 (60 overs)	v	Lancashire; 267/3 (57.3 overs)
Zaheer Abbas 73; Bob Ratcliffe 2/39 (12 overs)		David Lloyd 121*; Brian Brain 2/42 (12 overs)

Lancashire won by 7 wickets
Old Trafford, Manchester
Umpires: Dickie Bird & Barrie Meyer
Player of the match: David Lloyd (Lancashire)

- Match was scheduled for one day but extended to two.

19, 20 July 1978
(scorecard)

Leicestershire; 214/8 (60 overs)	v	Hampshire; 140 all out (51.2 overs)
Chris Balderstone 73; Andy Roberts 3/40 (12 overs)		Trevor Jesty 31; Les Taylor 3/11 (6.2 overs)

Leicestershire won by 74 runs
Grace Road, Leicester
Umpires: David Halfyard & Jack van Geloven
Player of the match: Chris Balderstone (Leicestershire)

- Match was scheduled for one day but extended to two.

19 July 1978
(scorecard)

Northamptonshire; 248/9 (60 overs)	v	Kent; 249/5 (59.5 overs)
Peter Willey 77; John Shepherd 4/38 (12 overs)		Graham Johnson 76; Sarfraz Nawaz 2/41 (12 overs)

Kent won by 5 wickets
County Ground, Northampton
Umpires: Fred Goodall & Alan Whitehead
Player of the match: Peter Willey (Northampton)

19, 20 July 1978
(scorecard)

Sussex; 221/6 (60 overs)	v	Staffordshire; 219/9 (60 overs)
Paul Parker 61; Keith Stride 2/39 (12 overs)		Nasim-ul-Ghani 85; Imran Khan 4/27 (12 overs)

Sussex won by 2 runs
Lichfield Road, Stone
Umpires: David Constant & Ray Julian
Player of the match: Geoff Arnold (Sussex)

- Match was scheduled for one day but extended to two.

19, 20 July 1978
(scorecard)

Nottinghamshire; 225/7 (60 overs)	v	Yorkshire; 226/9 (59.3 overs)
Clive Rice 71; Graham Stevenson 3/41 (12 overs)		Geoff Boycott 62; Clive Rice 2/23 (12 overs)

Yorkshire won by 1 wicket
Park Avenue, Bradford
Umpires: Don Oslear & Roderick Wilson
Player of the match: Clive Rice (Nottinghamshire)

- Match was scheduled for one day but extended to two.

=== Quarter-finals ===
2, 3 August 1978
(scorecard)

Kent; 120 all out (53.5 overs)	v	Somerset; 122/5 (47 overs)
Asif Iqbal 48; Colin Dredge 4/23 (12 overs)		Vic Marks 30; John Shepherd 2/16 (12 overs)

Somerset won by 5 wickets
St Lawrence Ground, Canterbury
Umpires: Lloyd Budd & John Langridge
Player of the match: Colin Dredge (Somerset)

- Match was scheduled for one day but extended to two.

2, 3, 4 August 1978
(scorecard)

Lancashire; 279/6 (60 overs)	v	Middlesex; 258 all out (57.5 overs)
Andrew Kennedy 131; Phil Edmonds 2/52 (12 overs)		Mike Gatting 62; David Hughes 4/69 (11.5 overs)

Lancashire won by 21 runs
Old Trafford, Manchester
Umpires: Dickie Bird & Peter Wight
Player of the match: Andrew Kennedy (Lancashire)

- Match was scheduled for one day but extended to three.

2, 3, 4 August 1978
(scorecard)

Essex; 73/2 (10 overs)	v	Leicestershire; 70/8 (10 overs)
Norbert Phillip 24*; Les Taylor 1/31 (5 overs)		Brian Davison 24; John Lever 4/27 (5 overs)

Essex won by 3 runs
Grace Road, Leicester
Umpires: Bill Alley & Ken Palmer
Player of the match: John Lever (Essex)

- Match was scheduled for one day but extended to three. Match was reduced before play started to 10 overs per side.

2, 3, 4 August 1978
(scorecard)

Yorkshire; 174/7 (52 overs)	v	Sussex
Kevin Sharp 61; Paul Phillipson 3/23 (6 overs)

No result
Headingley, Leeds
Umpires: Eddie Phillipson & Tom Spencer

- Match was scheduled for one day but extended to three. Match was replayed on 4 August.

4 August 1978
(scorecard)

Sussex; 68/6 (10 overs)	v	Yorkshire; 59/8 (10 overs)
Javed Miandad 27; Graham Stevenson 3/36 (5 overs)		Kevin Sharp 21; Imran Khan 3/22 (5 overs)

Sussex won by 9 runs
Headingley, Leeds
Umpires: Eddie Phillipson & Tom Spencer
Player of the match: Imran Khan (Sussex)

- Match was reduced before play started to 10 overs per side.

=== Semi-finals ===
16 August 1978
(scorecard)

Somerset; 287/6 (60 overs)	v	Essex; 287 all out (60 overs)
Viv Richards 116; Norbert Phillip 2/56 (11 overs)		Graham Gooch 61; Ian Botham 2/48 (12 overs)

Somerset won by losing fewer wickets
County Ground, Taunton
Umpires: David Evans & Arthur Jepson
Player of the match: Viv Richards (Somerset)

16 August 1978
(scorecard)

Sussex; 277/8 (60 overs)	v	Lancashire; 141 all out (51.4 overs)
Javed Miandad 75; Colin Croft 3/53 (12 overs)		Clive Lloyd 40; John Barclay 3/27 (12 overs)

Sussex won by 136 runs
County Ground, Hove
Umpires: Cec Pepper & Cec Pepper
Player of the match: Javed Miandad (Sussex)

=== Final ===
2 September 1978
(scorecard)

Somerset; 207/7 (60 overs)	v	Sussex; 211/5 (53.1 overs)
Ian Botham 80; John Barclay 2/21 (12 overs)		Paul Parker 62*; Ian Botham 2/65 (12 overs)

Sussex won by 5 wickets
Lord's, London
Umpires: Dickie Bird & Barrie Meyer
Player of the match: Paul Parker (Sussex)
