= Martin Hill (cricketer) =

English cricketer

Personal information
- Full name: Martin R Hill
- Born: 1 April 1945 (age 81); Quarry Bank, Brierley Hill, England
- Batting: Right-handed

Domestic team information
- Years: Team
- 1966 & 1978: Staffordshire

Career statistics
Competition	List A
Matches	2
Runs scored	20
Batting average	10.00
100s/50s	0/0
Top score	14
Catches/stumpings	0/–
- Source: Cricinfo, 17 June 2011

Martin R Hill (born 1 April 1945) is a former English cricketer. Hill was a right-handed batsman. He was born in Quarry Bank, Brierley Hill, Staffordshire.

Hill made his debut for Staffordshire in the 1966 Minor Counties Championship against Bedfordshire. Hill next played for Staffordshire in 1978, playing 5 further Minor Counties Championship matches. It was in 1978 that he made his List A debut against Devon in the 1st round of Gillette Cup. He made a further List A appearance, against Sussex in the 2nd round of the same tournament. In his 2 List A matches, he scored 20 runs at an average of 10.00, with a high score of 14.
