= Douglas Henson =

English cricketer

Personal information
- Full name: Douglas Henry Henson
- Born: 27 May 1930; Shrewsbury, Shropshire, England
- Died: 6 June 2003 (aged 73); Stoke-on-Trent, Staffordshire, England
- Batting: Right-handed
- Bowling: Right-arm medium

Domestic team information
- Years: Team
- 1963–1973: Staffordshire

Career statistics
Competition	List A
Matches	3
Runs scored	49
Batting average	24.50
100s/50s	–/–
Top score	28
Balls bowled	177
Wickets	4
Bowling average	16.75
5 wickets in innings	–
10 wickets in match	–
Best bowling	3/16
Catches/stumpings	1/–
- Source: Cricinfo, 20 June 2011

Douglas Henry Henson (27 May 1930 – 6 June 2003) was an English cricketer. Henson was a right-handed batsman who bowled right-arm medium pace. He was born in Shrewsbury, Shropshire.

Henson made his debut for Staffordshire in the 1963 Minor Counties Championship against the Lancashire Second XI. Henson played Minor counties cricket for Staffordshire from 1963 to 1973, which included 82 Minor Counties Championship matches. In 1971, he made his List A debut against Glamorgan in the Gillette Cup. He played 2 further List A matches for Staffordshire, against Dorset and Lancashire in the 1973 Gillette Cup. In his 3 matches, he scored 49 runs at an average of 24.50, with a high score of 28. With the ball, he took 4 wickets at a bowling average of 16.75, with best figures of 3/16. He also captained Staffordshire during his time with the county.

He died in Stoke-on-Trent, Staffordshire on 6 June 2003.
