= Malcolm Milward =

English cricketer (born 1948)

Personal information
- Full name: Malcolm Milward
- Born: 22 August 1948 (age 78); Stoke-on-Trent, Staffordshire, England
- Batting: Right-handed
- Bowling: Right-arm medium

Domestic team information
- Years: Team
- 1976–1978: Staffordshire

Career statistics
Competition	List A
Matches	1
Runs scored	–
Batting average	–
100s/50s	–/–
Top score	–
Balls bowled	72
Wickets	–
Bowling average	–
5 wickets in innings	–
10 wickets in match	–
Best bowling	–
Catches/stumpings	–/–
- Source: Cricinfo, 18 June 2011

Malcolm Milward (born 22 August 1948) is a former English cricketer. Milward was a right-handed batsman who bowled right-arm medium pace. He was born in Stoke-on-Trent, Staffordshire.

Milward made a single appearance for Staffordshire in the 1976 Minor Counties Championship against Lincolnshire. In Staffordshires' first-innings, he was dismissed for a duck by Somachandra de Silva, while in their second-innings he ended unbeaten on 2. With the ball, he took the wicket of Michael Hodson in Lincolnshires' first-innings for the cost of 9 runs from 4 overs, while he didn't bowl in their second-innings. He next played for Staffordshire in 1978, making his only List A appearance against Devon in the Gillette Cup. In this match, he didn't bat and bowled 12 wicket-less overs.
