= Sidney Owen =

Sidney, Sid, or Syd Owen may refer to:

- Sid Owen (born 1972), British actor who appeared in EastEnders
- Sidney Owen (cricketer) (born 1942), English cricketer for Staffordshire
- Sidney M. Owen (1838–1910), American politician
- Syd Owen (1922–1999), English football player and manager
- Syd Owen (footballer, born 1885) (1885–1925), English football player
