= Thomas Pearsall =

Thomas Pearsall may refer to:

- Thomas Pearsall (Australian politician) (1920–2003), Australian politician
- Thomas Pearsall (cricketer) (born 1943), English cricketer
- Thomas J. Pearsall (1903–1981), American attorney, politician and philanthropist from North Carolina
