= Colin Price =

English cricketer

Personal information
- Full name: Colin Leonard Price
- Born: 24 October 1943 (age 83); Birmingham, Warwickshire, England
- Batting: Right-handed

Domestic team information
- Years: Team
- 1966–1976: Staffordshire

Career statistics
Competition	List A
Matches	2
Runs scored	64
Batting average	32.00
100s/50s	–/1
Top score	52
Balls bowled	–
Wickets	–
Bowling average	–
5 wickets in innings	–
10 wickets in match	–
Best bowling	–
Catches/stumpings	–/–
- Source: Cricinfo, 20 June 2011

Colin Leonard Price (born 24 October 1943) is a former English cricketer. Price was a right-handed batsman. He was born in Birmingham, Warwickshire.

Price made his debut for Staffordshire in the 1966 Minor Counties Championship against Norfolk. Price played Minor counties cricket for Staffordshire from 1966 to 1976, which included 24 Minor Counties Championship matches. In 1973, he made his List A debut against Dorset in the Gillette Cup. In this match, Price scored 12 runs before being dismissed by Derek Shackleton, with Staffordshire going on to win the match by 79 runs. He made his second and last List A appearance in the following round against Lancashire. Price scored 52 runs in this match, before being dismissed by Peter Lee.

Colin Price played most of his cricket in the Birmingham League for Aston Unity Cricket Club, with a crowning achievement of being the first ever amateur cricketer in the history of the Birmingham League (the oldest organized cricket league in the world) to score more than 1,000 runs in a season, scoring 1093 runs, reaching this feat in the same year as professional Australian test cricketer Graham Yallop, and at the time of writing only 10 other players have ever managed this accolade.

Price also captained the league winning side of 1977, where he both provided top order batting and unusually captained the side from the wicket keeping field position.
