= Michael Green =

Michael or Mike Green may refer to:

== Academics ==
- Michael Green (biologist) (1954–2023), professor at the University of Massachusetts Amherst
- Michael Green (physicist) (born 1946), professor at Queen Mary University
- Michael Jonathan Green (born 1961), professor at Georgetown
- Michael Cawood Green (born 1954), South African born academic and writer

== Entertainment ==
- Michael Green (agent) (fl. 1990s–2010s), American talent manager and film producer
- Michael Green (artist) (1929–2022), British painter and sculptor
- Michael Green (humorist) (1927–2018), British author and journalist
- Michael Green (radio) (fl. 1970s–1990s), British former controller of BBC Radio 4
- Michael Green (writer) (fl. 2000s–2020s), American screenwriter, comics writer, and television producer
- Michael Green (youtuber) (fl. 2010s), American vlogger, son of The Angry Grandpa
- Mikey Green (fl. 2000s), British musician

== Politics ==
- Michael Green (diplomat) (died 2012), New Zealand
- Mike Green (Michigan politician) (1948–2024)
- Mike Green (West Virginia politician) (born 1973)

== Sports ==
=== American football ===
- Mike Green (defensive back) (born 1976)
- Mike Green (defensive end) (born 2003)
- Mike Green (American football, born 1961) (linebacker)
- Mike Green (running back) (born 1976)
- Mike Green (outside linebacker) (born 2003)

=== Association football ===
- Michael Green (soccer, born 1978), American defender
- Mike Green (footballer, born 1946), English centre half
- Mike Green (footballer, born May 1989), English full back
- Mike Green (footballer, born July 1989), English goalkeeper

=== Other sports ===
- Michael Green (Australian rules footballer) (born 1948)
- Michael Green (British Army officer) (1891–1971), English cricketer
- Michael Green (cricketer, born 1951), English cricketer
- Michael Green (field hockey) (born 1972), German field hockey player
- Michael Green (sailor) (born 1954), Olympic sailor
- Michael Green (sprinter) (born 1970), Jamaican
- Michael Green (swimmer) (born 1963), British
- Michael Green (tennis) (born 1937), American player in the 1950s and 60s
- Mike Green (basketball, born 1951), American
- Mike Green (basketball, born 1985), American
- Mike Green (ice hockey, born 1979), Canadian ice hockey centre
- Mike Green (ice hockey, born 1985), Canadian ice hockey defenceman
- Mike Green (racquetball) (born 1973), Canadian

== Other ==
- Michael Green (architect) (born 1966), Canadian architect
- Michael Green (murder victim) (died 1878), American lynching victim
- Michael Green (New York lawyer) (born 1961), district attorney for Monroe County, New York
- Sir Michael Green (judge) (born 1964), British High Court judge
- Michael Green (theologian) (1930-2019), British Anglican priest
- Michael Joseph Green (1917–1982), US Catholic bishop
- Michael P. Green (born 1947), British businessman
- Mickey Green (1942–2020), English criminal
- "Michael Green", pseudonym used by UK politician Grant Shapps as a web marketer
  - "Michael Green", name used by activist/comedian Heydon Prowse when running against Shapps in the 2015 United Kingdom general election

== See also ==
- Michael Greene (1933–2020), film & TV actor
- Mike Greene (disambiguation)
- JaMychal Green (born 1990), American basketball player
