= Peter Ranells =

English cricketer (born 1954)

Personal information
- Full name: Peter Laurence Ranells
- Born: 26 December 1954 (age 71); Bramhall, Cheshire, England
- Batting: Right-handed
- Bowling: Right-arm fast-medium

Domestic team information
- Years: Team
- 1974–1986: Shropshire

Career statistics
Competition	List A
Matches	2
Runs scored	13
Batting average	13.00
100s/50s	–/–
Top score	13
Balls bowled	136
Wickets	3
Bowling average	35.66
5 wickets in innings	–
10 wickets in match	–
Best bowling	3/38
Catches/stumpings	–/–
- Source: Cricinfo, 4 July 2011

Peter Laurence Ranells (born 26 December 1954) is a former English cricketer. Ranells was a right-handed batsman who bowled right-arm fast-medium. He was born in Bramhall, Cheshire and educated at Adams Grammar School at Newport, Shropshire, Glossop Grammar School and Rossall School.

Ranells made his debut for Shropshire in the 1974 Minor Counties Championship against Staffordshire. Ranells played Minor counties cricket for Shropshire from 1974 to 1986, which included 52 Minor Counties Championship appearances and 4 MCCA Knockout Trophy matches. He made his List A debut against Surrey in the 1978 Gillette Cup. In this match, took 3 wickets for the cost of 38 runs from 10.4 overs. He made a further List A appearance against Northamptonshire in the 1985 NatWest Trophy. He bowled 12 wicket-less overs for the cost of 69 runs, while with the bat he scored 13 runs before being dismissed by Robin Boyd-Moss. He also appeared in Warwickshire's Second XI and played at club level in Shropshire for Newport.
