= Robert King (cricketer, born 1978) =

English cricketer (born 1978)

Personal information
- Full name: Robert Daniel King
- Born: 10 July 1978 (age 48); Stoke-on-Trent, Staffordshire, England
- Nickname: Kingy
- Batting: Right-handed
- Bowling: Right-arm off break

Domestic team information
- Years: Team
- 2003–2007: Staffordshire

Career statistics
Competition	List A
Matches	1
Runs scored	6
Batting average	6.00
100s/50s	–/–
Top score	6
Balls bowled	–
Wickets	–
Bowling average	–
5 wickets in innings	–
10 wickets in match	–
Best bowling	–
Catches/stumpings	–/–
- Source: Cricinfo, 13 June 2011

Robert Daniel King (born 10 July 1978) is an English cricketer. King was a right-handed batsman who bowled right-arm off break. He was born in Stoke-on-Trent, Staffordshire.

King made his debut for Staffordshire in the 2003 Minor Counties Championship against Buckinghamshire. King played Minor counties cricket for Staffordshire from 2003 to 2007, which included 22 Minor Counties Championship matches and 11 MCCA Knockout Trophy matches. In 2004, he made his only List A appearance against Lancashire in the Cheltenham & Gloucester Trophy. In this match, he scored 6 runs opening the batting, before being dismissed by Dominic Cork.
