= Timothy Heap =

English cricketer

Personal information
- Full name: Timothy Bubba Heap
- Born: 2 March 1969 (age 57); Wakefield, Yorkshire, England
- Batting: Right-handed
- Bowling: Right-arm medium

Domestic team information
- Years: Team
- 1992–1995: Staffordshire

Career statistics
Competition	List A
Matches	2
Runs scored	7
Batting average	7.00
100s/50s	–/–
Top score	7
Balls bowled	108
Wickets	2
Bowling average	40.50
5 wickets in innings	–
10 wickets in match	–
Best bowling	2/58
Catches/stumpings	–/–
- Source: Cricinfo, 15 June 2011

Timothy Michael Heap (born 2 March 1969) is a former English cricketer. Heap was a right-handed batsman who bowled right-arm medium. He was born in Wakefield, Yorkshire.

Heap made his debut for Staffordshire in the 1992 Minor Counties Championship against Lincolnshire. Heap played Minor counties cricket for Staffordshire from 1992 to 1995, which included 19 Minor Counties Championship matches and 7 MCCA Knockout Trophy matches. In 1994, he made his List A debut against Surrey in the NatWest Trophy. He played a further List A match against Kent in the 1995 NatWest Trophy. In his 2 List A matches, he scored 7 runs, while with the ball, he took 2 wickets at a bowling average of 40.50, with best figures of 2/58.
