= Russell Inglis =

English cricketer

Personal information
- Born: 13 June 1936; Consett, County Durham, England
- Died: 28 April 1982 (aged 45); Gosforth, Northumberland, England
- Batting: Right-handed
- Bowling: Right-arm medium

Domestic team information
- Years: Team
- 1965–1969: Minor Counties
- 1956–1973: Durham

Career statistics
Competition	First-class	List A
Matches	3	8
Runs scored	91	152
Batting average	18.20	19.00
100s/50s	0/0	0/0
Top score	43	47
Balls bowled	72	192
Wickets	2	2
Bowling average	12.00	41.50
5 wickets in innings	0	0
10 wickets in match	0	n/a
Best bowling	2/2	1/23
Catches/stumpings	5/–	3/–
- Source: Cricinfo, 6 August 2011

Russell Inglis (13 June 1936 – 28 April 1982) was an English cricketer. Inglis was a right-handed batsman who bowled right-arm medium pace. He was born in Consett, County Durham.

Inglis made his debut for Durham against the Warwickshire Second XI in the 1956 Minor Counties Championship. He played Minor counties cricket for Durham from 1956 to 1973, making 130 Minor Counties Championship appearances. He made his List A debut against Hertfordshire in the 1964 Gillette Cup. He made 7 further List A appearances, the last of which came against Essex in the 1973 Gillette Cup. In his 7 List A matches, he scored 152 runs at an average of 19.00, with a high score of 47. With the ball, he took 2 wickets at a bowling average of 41.50, with best figures of 1/23. By the time serious illness led to an early retirement from the game, Inglis had scored 6,457 runs for Durham in the Minor Counties Championship, at the time a county record. He captained Durham in 1972.

He also played first-class cricket for the Minor Counties during his career. His first-class debut came against the touring South Africans in 1965. He made 2 further first-class appearances for the team, against the touring Pakistanis in 1967, and the touring West Indians in 1969. In his 3 first-class matches, he scored 91 runs at an average of 18.20, with a high score of 43. With the ball, he took 2 wickets at an average of 12.00, with best figures of 2/2.

Inglis died from a heart attack on 28 April 1982. His place of death is given as Chester-le-Street in his obituary in the 1983 edition of the Wisden Cricketers' Almanack, although authoritative sites ESPNcricinfo and CricketArchive have his place of death as Gosforth, Northumberland.
