= 1975 English cricket season =

The 1975 English cricket season was the 76th in which the County Championship had been an official competition. The inaugural Cricket World Cup was won by West Indies, who defeated Australia in an exciting final. Australia toured England to compete for the Ashes and won the series 1–0. Leicestershire won their first County Championship title.

== Honours ==
- County Championship - Leicestershire
- Gillette Cup - Lancashire
- Sunday League - Hampshire
- Benson & Hedges Cup - Leicestershire
- Minor Counties Championship - Hertfordshire
- Second XI Championship - Surrey II
- Wisden - Ian Chappell, Peter Lee, Rick McCosker, David Steele, Bob Woolmer

== Test series ==
England played a four-Test Ashes series against Australia but lost the first at Edgbaston following Mike Denness's surprising decision to put Australia in. The other three were drawn, the one at Headingley being abandoned in controversial circumstances when the pitch was destroyed overnight by political protestors. Australia therefore retained the Ashes.

Cumulative record - Test wins	1876–1975
England	71
Australia	87
Drawn	66

== Leading batsmen ==
1975 English cricket season – leading batsmen by average
Name	Innings	Runs	Highest	Average	100s
Rohan Kanhai	22	1073	178*	82.53	3
Geoffrey Boycott	34	1915	201*	73.65	6
Clive Lloyd	27	1423	167*	61.86	6
Doug Walters	18	784	103*	60.30	3
Barry Richards	32	1621	135*	60.03	3

1975 English cricket season – leading batsmen by aggregate
Name	Innings	Runs	Highest	Average	100s
Geoffrey Boycott	34	1915	201*	73.65	6
David Steele	39	1756	126*	48.77	3
Tony Greig	37	1699	226	47.19	5
Mike Brearley	39	1656	150	53.41	4
Barry Richards	32	1621	135*	60.03	3

== Leading bowlers ==
1975 English cricket season – leading bowlers by average
Name	Balls	Maidens	Runs	Wickets	Average
David Steele	453	34	148	11	13.45
Andy Roberts	2511	141	901	57	15.80
Mike Hendrick	2959	148	1077	68	15.83
Bernard Julien	1620	76	707	40	17.67
Peter Lever	2515	116	1098	61	18.00

1975 English cricket season – leading bowlers by aggregate
Name	Balls	Maidens	Runs	Wickets	Average
Peter Lee	4799	199	2067	112	18.45
Sarfraz Nawaz	4342	173	2051	101	20.30
John Lever	4225	155	1807	85	21.25
Bishan Bedi	4640	227	1973	85	23.21
Malcolm Nash	4412	192	2002	85	23.55

== Annual reviews ==
- Playfair Cricket Annual 1976
- Wisden Cricketers' Almanack 1976
