= Roger Lancaster (cricketer) =

English cricketer

Personal information
- Full name: Roger Lancaster
- Born: 4 February 1951 (age 75); Biddulph, Staffordshire, England
- Batting: Right-handed
- Bowling: Right-arm fast-medium

Domestic team information
- Years: Team
- 1976–1979: Staffordshire

Career statistics
Competition	List A
Matches	1
Runs scored	4
Batting average	–
100s/50s	0/0
Top score	4*
Balls bowled	72
Wickets	1
Bowling average	61.00
5 wickets in innings	0
10 wickets in match	0
Best bowling	1/61
Catches/stumpings	0/–
- Source: Cricinfo, 17 June 2011

Roger Lancaster (born 4 February 1951) is a former English cricketer. Lancaster was a right-handed batsman who bowled right-arm fast-medium. He was born in Biddulph, Staffordshire.

Lancaster made his debut for Staffordshire in the 1976 Minor Counties Championship against Shropshire. Lancaster played Minor counties cricket for Staffordshire from 1976 to 1979, which included 13 Minor Counties Championship matches. In 1976, he made his only List A appearance against Essex in the Gillette Cup. In this match, he scored 4 unbeaten runs and with the ball he took the wicket of Ken McEwan for the cost of 61 runs from 12 overs.
