= Tony Durley =

English cricketer

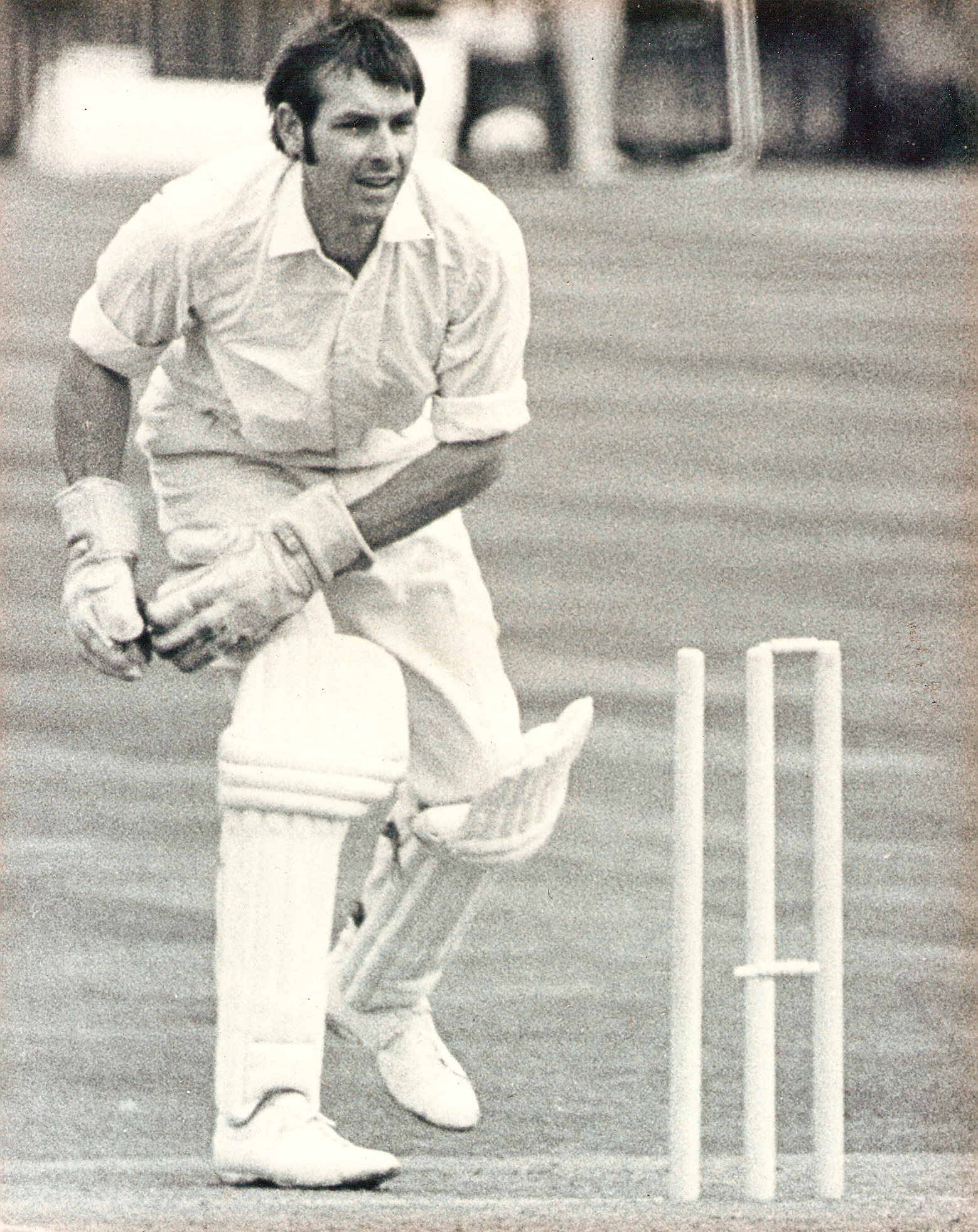

Personal information
- Full name: Anthony William Durley
- Born: 30 September 1933; Ilford, Essex
- Died: 1 January 1993 (aged 59); Luton, Bedfordshire
- Batting: Right-handed
- Role: Wicket-keeper

Domestic team information
- Years: Team
- 1957: Essex
- 1960–1976: Bedfordshire

Career statistics
Competition	First-class	List A
Matches	5	6
Runs scored	38	140
Batting average	4.75	23.33
100s/50s	0/0	0/1
Top score	16	75
Catches/stumpings	3/–	3/–
- Source: Cricinfo, 5 September 2011

Anthony William Durley (30 September 1933 – 1 January 1993) was an English cricketer. Durley was a right-handed batsman who fielded as a wicket-keeper. He was born in Ilford, Essex.

Durley made his first-class debut for Essex against Derbyshire in the 1957 County Championship. He made four further first-class appearances in what would be his only season in first-class cricket. He struggled in these five matches, scoring 38 runs at an average of 4.75, with a high score of 16.

He joined Bedfordshire in 1960, making his debut for the county in the Minor Counties Championship against Cambridgeshire. He played Minor counties cricket for Bedfordshire from 1960 to 1976, making 96 Minor Counties Championship appearances. He made his List A debut for the county against Northamptonshire in the 1967 Gillette Cup. He made five further List A appearances, the last of which came against Lancashire in the 1973 Gillette Cup. In his six List A matches, he scored 140 runs at an average of 23.33, with a high score of 75. This score, which was his only List A fifty, came against Lancashire in 1973.

He died on New Year's Day in 1993 at Luton, Bedfordshire.
