= Keith Maguire =

English cricketer

Personal information
- Full name: Keith Robert Maguire
- Born: 20 March 1961 (age 65); Marston Green, Warwickshire, England
- Batting: Right-handed
- Bowling: Right-arm medium

Domestic team information
- Years: Team
- 1984–1986: Staffordshire
- 1982: Warwickshire

Career statistics
| Competition | First-class | List A |
|---|---|---|
| Matches | 3 | 5 |
| Runs scored | 3 | 0 |
| Batting average | 1.00 | 0.00 |
| 100s/50s | –/– | –/– |
| Top score | 2 | 0* |
| Balls bowled | 210 | 258 |
| Wickets | 1 | 5 |
| Bowling average | 123.00 | 42.40 |
| 5 wickets in innings | – | – |
| 10 wickets in match | – | – |
| Best bowling | 1/32 | 3/64 |
| Catches/stumpings | –/– | 1/– |
- Source: Cricinfo, 7 July 2011

Keith Robert Maguire (born 20 March 1961) is a former English cricketer. Maguire was a right-handed batsman who bowled right-arm medium pace. He was born in Marston Green, Warwickshire.

Maguire made his first-class debut for Warwickshire against Northamptonshire in the 1982 County Championship. He made two further first-class appearances for Warwickshire, against Somerset and Middlesex, both in the 1982 County Championship. A bowler, he took just a single wicket in his 3 first-class matches, which came at an overall cost of 123 runs, with best figures of 1/32. He made his List A debut for Warwickshire in the 1982 John Player League against Northamptonshire, with him playing a further match in that season's competition against Middlesex. He again took just a single wicket, which came at an overall cost of 85.00, with Maguire taking best figures of 1/43.

He left Warwickshire at the end of the 1982 season, playing for the Leicestershire Second XI in 1983, before joining Staffordshire in 1984. He made his debut for the county in the Minor Counties Championship against Lincolnshire. He played Minor counties cricket for Staffordshire from 1984 to 1986, making 17 Minor Counties Championship appearances, and 2 MCCA Knockout Trophy appearances. He made his first List A appearance for Staffordshire against Gloucestershire in the 1984 NatWest Trophy. He made two further List A appearances for Staffordshire, against Nottinghamshire in the 1985 NatWest Trophy and Glamorgan in the 1986 NatWest Trophy. In his 3 List A matches for the county, he took 4 wickets at an average of 31.75, with best figures of 3/64.
