= Timothy Hall =

English cricketer

Timothy Hall (born 25 July 1944) is a retired English cricketer. He was a right-handed batsman and a right-arm slow bowler who played for Dorset. He was born in Bristol.

Hall, who made his Second XI Championship debut in 1964 for Gloucestershire, played in the Minor Counties Championship for the first time in 1971.

Hall made his only List A appearance during the 1973 Gillette Cup competition, against Staffordshire. From the upper-middle order, Hall scored 23 runs, the team's highest score in a 79-run defeat.

Hall made just one further Minor Counties match, in the 1973 season.
