= David Hancock (cricketer) =

English cricketer

Personal information
- Full name: David Arthur Hancock
- Born: 28 March 1940 (age 86); Newcastle-under-Lyme, Staffordshire, England
- Batting: Left-handed

Domestic team information
- Years: Team
- 1977–1978: Minor Counties East
- 1972–1975: Minor Counties North
- 1958–1983: Staffordshire

Career statistics
Competition	List A
Matches	24
Runs scored	330
Batting average	13.75
100s/50s	–/1
Top score	68
Balls bowled	–
Wickets	–
Bowling average	–
5 wickets in innings	–
10 wickets in match	–
Best bowling	–
Catches/stumpings	4/–
- Source: Cricinfo, 21 June 2011

David Arthur Hancock (born 28 March 1940) is a former English cricketer. Hancock was a left-handed batsman. He was born in Newcastle-under-Lyme, Staffordshire.

Hancock made his debut for Staffordshire in the 1958 Minor Counties Championship against the Yorkshire Second XI. Hancock played Minor counties cricket for Staffordshire from 1958 to 1983, which included 204 Minor Counties Championship matches. In his entire Minor Counties Championship career for Staffordshire, he scored 9,303 runs at an average of 27.93, making 51 half centuries and 8 centuries, which included a high score of 148.

He made his List A debut for Staffordshire against Glamorgan in the 1971 Gillette Cup. Hancock made 5 further List A appearances for Staffordshire, the last coming against Sussex in the 1979 Gillette Cup. He scored 129 runs in these matches, which included his highest score in List A cricket, 68 against Sussex in 1979. However the majority of his List A appearances came for Minor Counties team in one form or another. He played for Minor Counties East in 5 matches and for Minor Counties North in 13 matches, representing both teams in the Benson & Hedges Cup. He scored 174 runs at an average of 13.38 for Minor Counties North, while for Minor Counties East he scored just 27 runs at an average of 5.40.
