= Michael Longmore =

English cricketer

Personal information
- Full name: Michael Colin Longmore
- Born: 19 September 1979 (age 47); Stoke-on-Trent, Staffordshire, England
- Batting: Right-handed

Domestic team information
- Years: Team
- 1999–2005: Staffordshire

Career statistics
Competition	List A
Matches	3
Runs scored	63
Batting average	21.00
100s/50s	0/0
Top score	40
Catches/stumpings	1/–
- Source: Cricinfo, 13 June 2011

Michael Colin Longmore (born 19 September 1979) is an English former cricketer. Longmore was a right-handed batsman. He was born in Stoke-on-Trent, Staffordshire.

Longmore made his debut for Staffordshire in the 1999 Minor Counties Championship against Cambridgeshire. Longmore played Minor counties cricket for Staffordshire from 1999 to 2005, which included 17 Minor Counties Championship matches and a single MCCA Knockout Trophy match. In 2001, he made his List A debut against Hertfordshire in the first round of the Cheltenham & Gloucester Trophy. His second appearance came against Northumberland in the second round of the same competition, with both rounds being played in 2001. He played a further List A match against Warwickshire in the third round of the same competition which was played in 2002. In his three List A matches, he scored 63 runs at an average of 21.00, with a high score of 41.
