= Neil Riddell =

English cricketer

Personal information
- Full name: Neil Anthony Riddell
- Born: 16 July 1947 (age 79); Staindrop, County Durham, England
- Batting: Left-handed
- Bowling: Right-arm medium

Domestic team information
- Years: Team
- 1979: Minor Counties North
- 1976–1978: Minor Counties East
- 1976–1986: Minor Counties
- 1973–1990: Durham

Career statistics
Competition	First-class	List A
Matches	3	54
Runs scored	84	1,098
Batting average	16.80	21.96
100s/50s	–/–	1/4
Top score	23	109*
Balls bowled	6	5
Wickets	–	–
Bowling average	–	–
5 wickets in innings	–	–
10 wickets in match	–	–
Best bowling	–	–
Catches/stumpings	4/–	16/–
- Source: Cricinfo, 2 January 2012

Neil Anthony Riddell (born 16 July 1947) is a former English cricketer. Riddell was a left-handed batsman who bowled right-arm medium pace. He was born at Staindrop, County Durham.

== Early career ==
Riddell made his debut for Durham in the 1972 Minor Counties Championship against Cumberland. He played Minor counties cricket for Durham throughout the remainder of the 1970s. In the 1973 Gillette Cup Riddell made his List A debut for Durham against Yorkshire, in what was a famous victory over their County Championship opponents. He made seven further List A appearances for Durham in the 1970s. In 1976 he made his first-class debut for the Minor Counties against the touring West Indians, and in the same year in which he made his debut for Minor Counties East in a List A match in the Benson & Hedges Cup against Northamptonshire. He played for Minor Counties East from 1976 to 1978, making nine List A appearances, scoring a total of 205 runs at an average of 25.62, with a high score of 109 not out. This score was his only List A century and came against Northamptonshire on debut for the team in 1976. In 1979, he made four List A appearances for Minor Counties North in the Benson & Hedges Cup.

== Durham captaincy ==
He was appointed Durham captain in 1980. In 1981, he played for the Minor Counties in List A cricket for the first time, making his debut in that format for the team against Hampshire in the Benson & Hedges Cup. He played List A cricket for the Minor Counties in the Benson & Hedges Cup until 1986, making 21 appearances. In these, he scored a total of 462 runs at an average of 23.10, with a high score of 74, one of four half centuries he made for the team. He also made two further first-class appearances for the Minor Counties in this decade, against the touring Zimbabweans in 1985 and the touring New Zealanders in 1986. All the while he continued to play Minor counties cricket for Durham throughout this decade, which included making his MCCA Knockout Trophy debut in 1983 against Cheshire. He made twelve further List A appearances for Durham, with his final appearance coming in the 1990 NatWest Trophy against Lancashire. In total, Riddell made twenty List A appearances for Durham, scoring a total of 347 runs at an average of 18.26, with a high score of 52.

He remained Durham captain throughout the 1980s, and finally retired from county cricket at the end of the 1990 season, having played 175 Minor Counties Championship matches and fourteen MCCA Knockout Trophy matches. Under his captaincy Durham won the Minor Counties Championship three times (1980, 1981 and 1984) and the MCCA Knockout Trophy in 1985. Two years after his retirement, Durham had been granted first-class status and were admitted to the County Championship.
