= Derek Soakell =

English cricketer

Personal information
- Full name: Derek William Soakell
- Born: 7 December 1939 (age 86); Haswell, County Durham, England
- Batting: Right-handed
- Bowling: Right-arm medium

Domestic team information
- Years: Team
- 1973: Durham
- 1970–1972: Northumberland
- 1966–1968: Durham

Career statistics
Competition	List A
Matches	2
Runs scored	46
Batting average	23.00
100s/50s	–/–
Top score	36
Balls bowled	–
Wickets	–
Bowling average	–
5 wickets in innings	–
10 wickets in match	–
Best bowling	–
Catches/stumpings	–/–
- Source: Cricinfo, 7 August 2011

Derek William Soakell (born 7 December 1939) is a former English cricketer. Soakell was a right-handed batsman who bowled right-arm medium pace in the late 1960s and early 1970s. He was born in Haswell, County Durham.

Soakell made his debut for Durham against the Warwickshire Second XI in the 1966 Minor Counties Championship. He played Minor counties cricket for Durham from 1966 to 1968, making 4 Minor Counties Championship appearances, before joining Northumberland in 1970. He played Minor counties cricket for Northumberland from 1970 to 1972, making 14 Minor Counties Championship appearances for Northumberland. He rejoined Durham in 1973, making 4 appearances that season in the Minor Counties Championship. 1973 saw him make his List A debut against Yorkshire in the Gillette Cup. In this match, he scored 10 unbeaten runs to guide Durham to a famous 5 wicket win. He made a further List A appearance against Essex in the following round of the same competition. He was dismissed for 36 runs in this match by Keith Pont, with Essex winning by 7 wickets.
