= Robert Grant (cricketer) =

English cricketer

Personal information
- Full name: Robert John Grant
- Born: 28 July 1965; Leamington Spa, Warwickshire, England
- Died: 30 October 2022 (aged 57)
- Batting: Right-handed
- Bowling: Right-arm medium

Domestic team information
- Years: Team
- 1989–1990: Staffordshire

Career statistics
Competition	List A
Matches	2
Runs scored	0
Batting average	–
100s/50s	0/0
Top score	0*
Balls bowled	144
Wickets	0
Bowling average	–
5 wickets in innings	–
10 wickets in match	–
Best bowling	–
Catches/stumpings	0/–
- Source: Cricinfo, 19 June 2011

Robert John Grant (28 July 1965 – 30 October 2022) was an English cricketer. Grant was a right-handed batsman who bowled right-arm medium pace. He was born in Leamington Spa, Warwickshire.

Grant made his debut for Staffordshire in the 1989 MCCA Knockout Trophy against Cheshire. Grant played Minor counties cricket for Staffordshire from 1989 to 1990, playing a further MCCA Knockout Trophy match against Shropshire in 1990, while having made a single Minor Counties Championship appearance in 1989 against Bedfordshire. In 1989, he made his List A debut against Glamorgan in the NatWest Trophy. He played a further List A match against Northamptonshire in the 1990 NatWest Trophy. In his two List A matches, Grant did not score any runs and bowled 24 wicket-less overs.
