= John Moore (cricketer, born 1943) =

English cricketer

Personal information
- Full name: John David Moore
- Born: 19 May 1943; Newcastle-under-Lyme, Staffordshire, England
- Died: 17 th November 2004
- Batting: Right-handed
- Bowling: Right-arm medium

Domestic team information
- Years: Team
- 1977: Minor Counties East
- 1975: Minor Counties North
- 1961–1980: Staffordshire

Career statistics
Competition	List A
Matches	12
Runs scored	128
Batting average	12.80
100s/50s	–/–2
Top score	49*
Balls bowled	–
Wickets	–
Bowling average	–
5 wickets in innings	–
10 wickets in match	–
Best bowling	–
Catches/stumpings	2/–
- Source: Cricinfo, 7 July 2011

John David Moore (19 May 1943 – 17 November 2004) was an English cricketer. Moore was a right-handed batsman who bowled right-arm medium pace. He was born in Newcastle-under-Lyme, Staffordshire.

Moore made his debut for Staffordshire in the 1961 Minor Counties Championship against Norfolk. He played Minor counties cricket for Staffordshire from 1961 to 1980, making 123 Minor Counties Championship appearances. He made his List A debut against Glamorgan in the 1971 Gillette Cup. He made five further List A appearances for Staffordshire, the last coming against Sussex in the 1978 Gillette Cup. In his six List A matches for Staffordshire, he scored 79 runs at an average of 15.80, with a high score of 49*.

Playing for Staffordshire allowed him to represent Minor Counties North, making his debut for the team in the 1975 Benson & Hedges Cup against Derbyshire. He made three further List A appearances for the team, the last of which came against Lancashire in the same competition. He scored 39 runs at an average of 13.00, with a high score of 28. He also made two List A appearances for Minor Counties East in the 1977 Benson & Hedges Cup against Essex and Middlesex. He also played club cricket at Wolverhampton and Penn cricket club in the 80's and 90's, becoming the first team captain with Penn and helping in the youth development of the club.
