= Lichfield Road, Stone =

Cricket ground in Stone, England

Coordinates: 52°53′51″N 2°08′16″W

Lichfield Road
Ground information
- Location: Stone, Staffordshire
- Establishment: 1948

Team information
Staffordshire	(1948–present)
- As of 24 June 2010; Source: Ground profile

Lichfield Road is a cricket ground in Stone, Staffordshire. The ground was established in 1948, when Staffordshire played Buckinghamshire in the grounds first Minor Counties Championship match. From 1948 to the present day, it has hosted 43 Minor Counties Championship matches.

The first List-A match played on the ground came in the 1973 Gillette Cup between Staffordshire and Dorset. From 1973 to 2004, the ground played host to 13 List-A matches, the last of which saw Staffordshire play Lancashire in the 2004 Cheltenham & Gloucester Trophy. In July 1974, the ground played host to a match between the England U-19 cricket team and West Indian U-19 cricket team, which was the first U-19 match for both teams.

In local domestic cricket, Lichfield Road is the home ground of Stone Cricket Club who play in the North Staffordshire and South Cheshire League.
