= Jamie Jervis =

English cricketer (born 1980)

Personal information
- Full name: Jamie Francis Jervis
- Born: 5 August 1980 (age 46); Stoke-on-Trent, Staffordshire, England
- Batting: Left-handed
- Bowling: Right-arm off break
- Relatives: Richie Jervis (brother)

Domestic team information
- Years: Team
- 1999–2001: Staffordshire

Career statistics
Competition	List A
Matches	1
Runs scored	19
Batting average	1.00
100s/50s	–/–
Top score	19
Balls bowled	–
Wickets	–
Bowling average	–
5 wickets in innings	–
10 wickets in match	–
Best bowling	–
Catches/stumpings	–/–
- Source: Cricinfo, 13 June 2011

Jamie Francis Jervis (born 5 August 1980) is a former English cricketer. Jervis was a left-handed batsman who bowled right-arm off break. He was born in Stoke-on-Trent, Staffordshire.

Jervis made his debut for Staffordshire in the 1999 MCCA Knockout Trophy against the Leicestershire Cricket Board. Jervis played Minor counties cricket for Staffordshire from 1999 to 2001, which included 14 Minor Counties Championship matches and 5 MCCA Knockout Trophy matches. In 2001, he made his only List A appearance against the Worcestershire Cricket Board in the Cheltenham & Gloucester Trophy. In this match, he scored 19 runs before being dismissed by Jonathan Wright.

His brother, Richie, also played Minor counties and List A cricket for Staffordshire.
