= Derek Nicholls =

English cricketer

Personal information
- Full name: Derek George Nicholls
- Born: 10 July 1947; Walsall, Staffordshire, England
- Died: 14 July 2010 (aged 63); Walsall, Staffordshire, England
- Batting: Right-handed
- Bowling: Right-arm fast-medium

Domestic team information
- Years: Team
- 1982: Minor Counties
- 1976–1983: Staffordshire

Career statistics
| Competition | List A |
|---|---|
| Matches | 5 |
| Runs scored | 38 |
| Batting average | 9.50 |
| 100s/50s | –/– |
| Top score | 15 |
| Balls bowled | 348 |
| Wickets | 14 |
| Bowling average | 18.28 |
| 5 wickets in innings | 1 |
| 10 wickets in match | – |
| Best bowling | 6/43 |
| Catches/stumpings | –/– |
- Source: Cricinfo, 17 June 2011

Derek George Nicholls (18 July 1947 – 14 July 2010) was an English cricketer. Nicholls was a right-handed batsman who bowled right-arm fast-medium. He was born in Walsall, Staffordshire.

Nicholls made his debut for Staffordshire in the 1976 Minor Counties Championship against Cheshire. Nicholls played Minor counties cricket for Staffordshire from 1976 to 1983, which included 42 Minor Counties Championship matches and a single MCCA Knockout Trophy match. In 1976, he made his List A debut for Staffordshire against Essex in the Gillette Cup. He made 2 further appearances in List A cricket for the county, against Devon in the 1st round of the 1978 Gillette Cup and Sussex in the 2nd round of the same competition. He later made 2 List A appearances for the Minor Counties cricket team in the 1982 Benson & Hedges Cup against Worcestershire and Yorkshire. In his total of 5 List A matches, he scored 38 runs at an average of 9.50, with a high score of 15. With the ball, he took 14 wickets at a bowling average of 18.28. He took a single five wicket haul with the ball, which came for the Minor Counties against Worcestershire, with him taking figures of 6/43 from 11 overs. Despite this effort, which earned him the man-of-the-match award, Worcestershire still won the match by 97 runs.

Nicholls died in Walsall on 14 July 2010, as a result of a stroke.
