= Michael Greene (disambiguation) =

Michael Greene (1933–2020) was an American actor.

Michael or Mike Greene may also refer to:

- Mike Greene (American football) (born 1999), American football player
- Michael F. Greene (1884–1951), Irish-born American labor union leader
- Mike Greene (arts executive) (fl. 1980s–2000s), American arts executive
- Mike Greene (British entrepreneur) (fl. 2010s), British entrepreneur and political candidate

== See also ==
- Michael Green (disambiguation)
