= Richard Harvey (cricketer) =

English cricketer (born 1974)

Personal information
- Full name: Richard Peter Harvey
- Born: 3 August 1974 (age 52); Stoke-on-Trent, Staffordshire, England
- Batting: Left-handed
- Bowling: Slow left-arm orthodox
- Relatives: Wife Lucy Harvey children Jack and Tilly-Jane born 2006

Domestic team information
- Years: Team
- 1997–present: Staffordshire

Career statistics
Competition	List A
Matches	11
Runs scored	201
Batting average	25.12
100s/50s	–/1
Top score	66
Balls bowled	18
Wickets	–
Bowling average	–
5 wickets in innings	–
10 wickets in match	–
Best bowling	–
Catches/stumpings	2/–
- Source: Cricinfo, 14 June 2011

Richard Peter Harvey (born 3 August 1974) is an English cricketer. Harvey is a left-handed batsman who bowled slow left-arm orthodox. He was born in Stoke-on-Trent, Staffordshire.

Harvey made his debut for Staffordshire in the 1997 Minor Counties Championship against Buckinghamshire. Harvey has played Minor counties cricket for Staffordshire from 1997 to present, which has included 71 Minor Counties Championship matches and 41 MCCA Knockout Trophy matches. In 1998, he made his List A debut against Leicestershire in the NatWest Trophy. He made 10 further appearances in List A cricket, the last coming against Surrey in the 2005 Cheltenham & Gloucester Trophy. In his 11 List A matches, he scored 201 runs at an average of 25.12, with a high score of 66. His highest score came against the Durham Cricket Board in the 1999 NatWest Trophy.
