= Sidney Owen (cricketer) =

English cricketer (born 1942)

Personal information
- Full name: Sidney Charles Owen
- Born: 5 May 1942 (age 84); Wellington, Shropshire, England
- Batting: Right-handed
- Role: Wicket-keeper

Domestic team information
- Years: Team
- 1972–1977: Staffordshire

Career statistics
Competition	List A
Matches	2
Runs scored	6
Batting average	6.00
100s/50s	–/–
Top score	6
Balls bowled	–
Wickets	–
Bowling average	–
5 wickets in innings	–
10 wickets in match	–
Best bowling	–
Catches/stumpings	5/1
- Source: Cricinfo, 17 June 2011

Sidney Charles Owen (born 5 May 1942) is a former English cricketer. Owen was a right-handed batsman who fielded as a wicket-keeper. He was born in Wellington, Shropshire.

Owen made his debut for Staffordshire in the 1972 Minor Counties Championship against Cheshire. Owen played Minor counties cricket for Staffordshire from 1972 to 1977, which included 25 Minor Counties Championship matches. In 1973, he made his List A debut against Dorset in the 1st round of the Gillette Cup. He wasn't required to bat in the match, but did take 4 catches and a single stumping in the Dorset innings. He made a further List A appearance, against Lancashire in the 2nd round of the same competition. He scored 6 runs in this match, before being dismissed by Peter Lever, while behind the stumps he took a single catch.
