= Andrew Mackelworth =

English cricketer

Personal information
- Full name: Andrew Nicholas Mackelworth
- Born: 15 May 1963 (age 63); Wolverhampton, Staffordshire, England
- Batting: Right-handed
- Role: Wicket-keeper

Domestic team information
- Years: Team
- 1994–2000: Shropshire
- 1989–1990: Staffordshire

Career statistics
Competition	List A
Matches	2
Runs scored	2
Batting average	1.00
100s/50s	–/–
Top score	2
Balls bowled	–
Wickets	–
Bowling average	–
5 wickets in innings	–
10 wickets in match	–
Best bowling	–
Catches/stumpings	–/–
- Source: Cricinfo, 17 June 2011

Andrew Nicholas Mackelworth (born 15 May 1963) is a former English cricketer. Mackelworth was a right-handed batsman who fielded as a wicket-keeper. He was born in Wolverhampton, Staffordshire and educated at Wolverhampton Grammar School.

Mackelworth made his debut for Staffordshire in the 1989 Minor Counties Championship against Bedfordshire. He played Minor counties for Staffordshire from 1989 to 1990, which included 8 Minor Counties Championship matches and 3 MCCA Knockout Trophy matches. He played a single List A match for Shropshire in the 1989 NatWest Trophy against Glamorgan. He was dismissed for 2 runs in this match by Adrian Dale. Mackelworth later joined Shropshire in 1994, making his debut for the county in the Minor Counties Championship against Wiltshire. He played Minor counties cricket for Shropshire from 1994 to 2000, making 36 Minor Counties Championship appearances and 8 MCCA Knockout Trophy appearances. Additionally, he also made a single List A appearance for the county in the 1997 NatWest Trophy against Sussex. He was dismissed for a duck in the match by James Kirtley. While playing for both counties, he played club cricket for Walsall and Wolverhampton.
