= Thomas Pearsall (cricketer) =

English cricketer (born 1943)

Personal information
- Full name: Thomas Pearsall
- Born: 18 May 1943 (age 83); West Bromwich, Staffordshire, England
- Batting: Left-handed
- Bowling: Right-arm (unknown style)

Domestic team information
- Years: Team
- 1979: Minor Counties North
- 1974–1981: Staffordshire

Career statistics
Competition	List A
Matches	5
Runs scored	66
Batting average	13.20
100s/50s	–/–
Top score	34
Balls bowled	–
Wickets	–
Bowling average	–
5 wickets in innings	–
10 wickets in match	–
Best bowling	–
Catches/stumpings	1/–
- Source: Cricinfo, 17 June 2011

Thomas A Pearsall (born 18 May 1943) is a former English cricketer. Pearsall was a left-handed batsman who was a right-arm bowler, but his bowling style is unknown. He was born in West Bromwich, Staffordshire.

Pearsall made his debut for Staffordshire in the 1974 Minor Counties Championship against Shropshire. Pearsall played Minor counties cricket for Staffordshire from 1974 to 1981, which included 29 Minor Counties Championship matches. In 1975, he made his List A debut for Staffordshire against Leicestershire in the Gillette Cup. He made 2 further appearances in List A cricket for the county, against Devon in the 1st round of the 1978 Gillette Cup and Sussex in the 2nd round of the same competition. In his 3 List A matches for the county, he scored 49 runs at an average of 16.33, with a high score of 34. He later made 2 List A appearances for the Minor Counties North in the 1979 Benson & Hedges Cup against Middlesex and Kent. In these matches, he scored 17 runs at an average of 8.50, with a high score of 9.
