= Ian Stokes =

English cricketer

Personal information
- Full name: Ian William Edward Stokes
- Born: 22 February 1964 (age 62); Solihull, Warwickshire, England
- Batting: Left-handed

Domestic team information
- Years: Team
- 1997–1998: Staffordshire

Career statistics
Competition	List A
Matches	2
Runs scored	22
Batting average	11.00
100s/50s	–/–
Top score	18
Balls bowled	–
Wickets	–
Bowling average	–
5 wickets in innings	–
10 wickets in match	–
Best bowling	–
Catches/stumpings	–/–
- Source: Cricinfo, 15 June 2011

Ian William Edward Stokes (born 22 February 1964) is a former English cricketer. Stokes was a left-handed batsman. He was born in Solihull, Warwickshire.

Stokes made his debut for Staffordshire in the 1997 MCCA Knockout Trophy against Buckinghamshire. Stokes played Minor counties cricket for Staffordshire from 1997 to 1998, which included 6 Minor Counties Championship matches and 4 MCCA Knockout Trophy matches. In 1997, he made his List A debut against Nottinghamshire in the NatWest Trophy. He played a further List A match against Leicestershire in the 1998 NatWest Trophy. In his 2 List A matches, he scored 22 runs at an average of 11.00, with a high score of 18.
