= Brian James (cricketer, born 1941) =

English cricketer

Personal information
- Full name: Brian George James
- Born: 21 March 1941; Wolverhampton, Staffordshire, England
- Died: 6 November 2002 (aged 61); Wolverhampton, Staffordshire, England
- Batting: Right-handed
- Bowling: Right-arm fast-medium

Domestic team information
- Years: Team
- 1962–1973: Staffordshire

Career statistics
Competition	List A
Matches	2
Runs scored	19
Batting average	9.50
100s/50s	–/–
Top score	19
Balls bowled	110
Wickets	3
Bowling average	16.66
5 wickets in innings	–
10 wickets in match	–
Best bowling	3/35
Catches/stumpings	–/–
- Source: Cricinfo, 17 June 2011

Brian George James (21 March 1941 – 6 November 2002) was an English cricketer. James was a right-handed batsman who bowled right-arm fast-medium. He was born in Wolverhampton, Staffordshire.

James made his debut for Staffordshire in the 1962 Minor Counties Championship against Durham. James played Minor counties cricket for Staffordshire from 1962 to 1973, which included 39 Minor Counties Championship matches. In 1973, he made his List A debut against Dorset in the Gillette Cup. He made a further appearance in List A cricket, against Lancashire in the 2nd round of the same tournament. In his 2 List A matches, he scored 19 runs, while with the ball he took 3 wickets at a bowling average of 16.66, with best figures of 3/35.

He died in his hometown on 6 November 2002.
