= Nick Archer (cricketer) =

English former cricketer

Nicolas Archer
Personal information
- Full name: Nicolas Archer
- Born: 30 August 1955 (age 71); Walsall, England
- Batting: Right-handed
- Bowling: Right-arm fast-medium

Domestic team information
- Years: Team
- 1984–1995: Staffordshire
- LA debut: 4 July 1984 Staffordshire v Gloucestershire
- Last LA: 27 June 1995 Staffordshire v Kent

Career statistics
Competition	List A
Matches	12
Runs scored	198
Batting average	16.50
100s/50s	0/0
Top score	45
Catches/stumpings	4/–
- Source: CricketArchive, 17 January 2009

Nicolas Archer (born 30 August 1955) is an English former first-class cricketer. He was a right-handed batsman and a right-arm medium-pace bowler who played for Staffordshire. He was born in Walsall.

Archer made his Minor Counties Championship debut the week before his 18th birthday, though he would not make another appearance in the competition for five years. He made his List A debut during the 1984 season, and made a single List A appearance in every season up to 1995, as Staffordshire lost every one of their first-round NatWest Trophy matches of that period.

A lower-middle order batsman, Archer remained the team's captain from his second to his final match, wherein that time he became their highest run-scorer with a run total of 10,651 runs.

Archer also held a great passion for rugby, where he played as a fly-half for Walsall and later moved on to Mosley rugby.

From 2000 to 2023 he served as the general manager of the Birmingham and District Premier League. He is chairman of the National Counties Cricket Association and prior to this did a stint as Staffordshire cricket chairman and before that 10 years as their secretary.
