= Richard Robinson (cricketer) =

English cricketer

Personal information
- Full name: Richard John Robinson
- Born: 5 May 1950; Ipswich, Suffolk, England
- Died: 20 March 2002 (aged 51); Ipswich, Suffolk, England
- Batting: Right-handed
- Bowling: Right-arm medium-fast

Domestic team information
- Years: Team
- 1968–1989: Suffolk

Career statistics
| Competition | List A |
|---|---|
| Matches | 8 |
| Runs scored | 95 |
| Batting average | 15.83 |
| 100s/50s | –/– |
| Top score | 40* |
| Balls bowled | 432 |
| Wickets | 8 |
| Bowling average | 35.75 |
| 5 wickets in innings | – |
| 10 wickets in match | – |
| Best bowling | 3/59 |
| Catches/stumpings | 3/– |
- Source: Cricinfo, 11 July 2011

Richard John Robinson (5 May 1950 – 20 March 2002) was an English cricketer. Robinson was a hard hitting right-handed batsman who bowled right-arm medium-fast. He was born in Ipswich, Suffolk.

Robinson made his debut for Suffolk in the 1968 Minor Counties Championship against Norfolk. Robinson played Minor counties cricket for Suffolk from 1968 to 1989, which included 95 Minor Counties Championship appearances and 2 MCCA Knockout Trophy appearances. He made his List A debut against Sussex in the 1978 Gillette Cup. He made 7 further List A appearances, the last of which came against Northamptonshire in the 1989 NatWest Trophy. In his 8 List A matches, he scored 95 runs at an average of 15.83, with a high score of 40 not out. With the ball, he took 8 wickets at a bowling average of 35.75, with best figures of 3/59.

He died in the town of his birth on 20 March 2002.
