= Ross Salmon =

English cricketer

Ross Salmon (born 6 November 1964) is a retired English cricketer. He was a right-handed batsman and right-arm medium-pace bowler who played for Staffordshire.

He was born in Leek, Staffordshire. Ross, who played for Derbyshire Second XI in 1983, made a single List A appearance for Staffordshire, during the 1992 NatWest Trophy competition, against Warwickshire. From the opening order, he scored a duck, the first of five victims of Allan Donald.

Ross took two catches in the match.

Ross played club cricket for Ashcombe Park, Little Stoke and Knypersley in the North Staffordshire and South Cheshire Cricket League. He was a club professional for 14 years.

He was a Physical Education teacher at St. Edward's C. of E. Academy in Leek, Staffordshire.
