= Keith Stride =

English cricketer (born 1944)

Personal information
- Full name: Keith Harvey Stride
- Born: 10 January 1944 (age 82); Dunstall, Staffordshire, England
- Batting: Right-handed
- Bowling: Left-arm fast-medium

Domestic team information
- Years: Team
- 1975: Minor Counties North
- 1970–1978: Staffordshire

Career statistics
Competition	List A
Matches	5
Runs scored	1
Batting average	1.00
100s/50s	–/–
Top score	1*
Balls bowled	354
Wickets	9
Bowling average	21.77
5 wickets in innings	–
10 wickets in match	–
Best bowling	3/66
Catches/stumpings	–/–
- Source: Cricinfo, 17 June 2011

Keith Harvey Stride (born 10 January 1944) is a former English cricketer. Stride was a right-handed batsman who bowled left-arm fast-medium. He was born in Dunstall, Staffordshire.

Stride made his debut for Staffordshire in the 1970 Minor Counties Championship against Norfolk. Stride played Minor counties cricket for Staffordshire from 1970 to 1978, which included 37 Minor Counties Championship matches. In 1975, he made his debut in List A cricket for Minor Counties North in the Benson & Hedges Cup against Lancashire. It was in that same season that he made his debut in that format for Staffordshire against Leicestershire in the Gillette Cup. He made 3 further appearances in List A cricket for the county, the last coming against Sussex in the 1978 Gillette Cup. In his 4 List A matches for the county, he took 9 wickets an average of 18.22, with best figures of 3/66.
