= Michael Green (cricketer, born 1951) =

English cricketer (born 1951)

Personal information
- Full name: Michael Redvers Green
- Born: 17 September 1951 (age 75); Stafford, Staffordshire, England
- Batting: Right-handed
- Role: Wicket-keeper

Domestic team information
- Years: Team
- 1971–1979: Staffordshire

Career statistics
Competition	List A
Matches	4
Runs scored	49
Batting average	24.50
100s/50s	–/–
Top score	27*
Balls bowled	–
Wickets	–
Bowling average	–
5 wickets in innings	–
10 wickets in match	–
Best bowling	–
Catches/stumpings	3/–
- Source: Cricinfo, 17 June 2011

Michael Redvers Green (born 17 September 1951) is a former English cricketer. Green was a right-handed batsman who fielded as a wicket-keeper. He was born in Stafford, Staffordshire.

Green made his debut for Staffordshire in the 1971 Minor Counties Championship against Northumberland. Green played Minor counties cricket for Staffordshire from 1971 to 1979, which included 41 Minor Counties Championship matches. In 1975, he made his List A debut against Leicestershire in the Gillette Cup. He made 3 further appearances in List A cricket, the last coming against Sussex in the 1978 Gillette Cup. In his 4 List A matches, he scored 49 runs at an average of 24.50, with a high score of 27 not out.
