= Richie Jervis =

English cricketer

Richie Jervis (born 12 October 1976) is an English cricketer. He is a right-handed batsman and right-arm medium-fast bowler who played for Staffordshire. He was born in Newcastle-under-Lyme.

Jervis, who represented Staffordshire in the Minor Counties Championship between 1997 and 1999, made a single List A appearance for the side during the 1999 season. From the tailend, Jervis did not bat in the match, but bowled four overs, taking two wickets. His brother, Jamie, also played Minor counties and List A cricket for Staffordshire.

Richie now plays for Wood Lane in the North Staffs and South Cheshire Cricket League.
