= Peter Graves (cricketer) =

English cricketer (born 1946)

Peter John Graves (born 19 May 1946) is a former English first-class cricketer. He represented Sussex and Orange Free State as a batsman. He served as vice-captain under Tony Greig at Sussex and later coached at the club.
