= Robert Dyer (English cricketer) =

English cricketer (born 1959)

Personal information
- Full name: Robert John Dyer
- Born: 21 April 1959 (age 67); Birmingham, Warwickshire, England
- Batting: Right-handed
- Bowling: Right-arm off break

Domestic team information
- Years: Team
- 1989–1992: Staffordshire

Career statistics
Competition	List A
Matches	2
Runs scored	0
Batting average	0.00
100s/50s	–/–
Top score	0
Balls bowled	72
Wickets	–
Bowling average	–
5 wickets in innings	–
10 wickets in match	–
Best bowling	–
Catches/stumpings	–/–
- Source: Cricinfo, 15 June 2011

Robert John Dyer (born 21 April 1959) is a former English cricketer. Dyer was a right-handed batsman who bowled right-arm off break. He was born in Birmingham. he is father to former Aston Villa and burton Albion footballer Jack Dyer.

Dyer made his debut for Staffordshire in the 1989 Minor Counties Championship against Norfolk. Dyer played Minor counties cricket for Staffordshire from 1989 to 1992, which included 5 Minor Counties Championship matches and 4 MCCA Knockout Trophy matches. In 1990, he made his List A debut against Northamptonshire in the NatWest Trophy. He played a further List A match against Warwickshire in the 1992 NatWest Trophy. In his 2 List A matches, he failed to score any runs and failed to take any wickets in the 15 overs be bowled.
