= John C. Boothroyd =

American academic

John Charles Boothroyd is the Burt and Marion Avery Professor in the Department of Microbiology and Immunology at Stanford University, best known for his studies on parasitology. In 2016 he was elected to the National Academy of Sciences in Microbial Biology and Animal, Nutritional, and Applied Microbial Sciences.

== Early life and education ==
Raised in Canada, Boothroyd has a BSc from McGill University in Montreal, Canada in 1975. He earned his PhD from the University of Edinburgh, Scotland, in molecular biology in 1979.

== Career ==
Boothroyd worked as a scientist at Wellcome Research Laboratories in the Department of Immunochemistry and Molecular Biology. He joined the faculty at Stanford University in 1982. In the period 1982-1999, Boothroyd's research focused on the cell and molecular biology of Trypanosoma brucei and, after 1983, also the cell biology and pathogenesis of the Apicomplexan parasite, Toxoplasma gondii.

Boothroyd was appointed to the position of the Burt and Marion Avery Professor of Immunology in February 2015 at the Stanford School of Medicine.

At Stanford, Boothroyd has served as senior associate dean for research and training at the School of Medicine (2002–2005), as a member of the Stanford President’s Commission on Graduate Education (2004-2005), and, from 2008, as Associate Vice Provost for Graduate Education and Postdoctoral Affairs. In 2018 he was chosen to be the faculty director of the Stanford-hosted global meeting of the 2018-2019 Schmidt Science Fellows. He has served as advisor to more than 65 Ph.D. and postdoctoral students.

== Honors ==
In 2008 he was awarded the Leuckart Medal from the German Society for Parasitology. In 2016 he was elected to become a member of the US National Academy of Sciences.
