= David Pashley =

English cricketer

Personal information
- Full name: David Kent Pashley
- Born: 25 May 1972 (age 54); Stoke-on-Trent, Staffordshire, England
- Batting: Left-handed

Domestic team information
- Years: Team
- 1996–1998: Staffordshire

Career statistics
Competition	List A
Matches	1
Runs scored	5
Batting average	5.00
100s/50s	–/–
Top score	5
Balls bowled	–
Wickets	–
Bowling average	–
5 wickets in innings	–
10 wickets in match	–
Best bowling	–
Catches/stumpings	–/–
- Source: Cricinfo, 14 June 2011

David Kent Pashley (born 24 May 1972) is a former English cricketer. Pashley was a left-handed batsman. He was born in Stoke-on-Trent, Staffordshire.

Pashley made his debut for Staffordshire in the 1996 Minor Counties Championship against Cambridgeshire. Pashley played Minor counties cricket for Staffordshire from 1996 to 1998, which included 15 Minor Counties Championship matches and 3 MCCA Knockout Trophy matches. In 1997, he made his only List A appearance against Nottinghamshire in the NatWest Trophy. In this match, he scored 5 runs before being dismissed by Nathan Astle, with Nottinghamshire winning the match by 10 wickets.
