= Dennis Marriott =

English cricketer

Personal information
- Full name: Dennis Alston Marriott
- Born: 29 November 1939; Saint Thomas, Jamaica
- Died: 5 December 2014 (aged 75); Croydon, Greater London, England
- Batting: Right-handed
- Bowling: Left-arm fast-medium
- Role: Bowler
- Source: Cricinfo, 31 March 2016

Dennis Alston Marriott (29 November 1939 – 5 December 2014) was a Jamaican-born cricketer. He played first-class cricket for Middlesex and Surrey.
