= Martyn Goulding =

English cricketer

Martyn Goulding (born 31 July 1954) was an English cricketer. He was a right-handed batsman and a right-arm medium-fast bowler who played for Devon. He was born in Westminster.

Goulding represented Devon for the first time in the Minor Counties Championship in 1974. Despite making seven appearances in the Gillette Cup and NatWest Trophy between 1978 and 1985, Goulding played in only three innings, from the tailend of the batting order.

Goulding scored no runs during his List A career, bowling 67.1 overs, and taking career-best figures of 5–21 against Cornwall.

Goulding made a single appearance for Gloucestershire Second XI in 1979.

Since 1996 he has been the landlord of the infamous Leeds' pub 'The Original Oak' and hit the headlines in the Yorkshire Post when he allowed a group of Australian cricket fans to pitch up their tents on the pub's beer garden when their hotel accommodation fell through
