= Clement G. Boothroyd =

British fighter pilot

Clement Graham Boothroyd
- Born: 25 August 1899; Halifax, Yorkshire, England
- Died: 6 February 1952 (aged 52); Jesmond, Newcastle on Tyne, England
- Military career
- Allegiance: England
- Branch: Aviation
- Rank: Lieutenant
- Unit: No. 20 Squadron RAF
- Awards: Distinguished Flying Cross, Mentioned in dispatches

Lieutenant Clement Graham Boothroyd DFC became an ace during the First World War. He flew as an observer/gunner in a Bristol F.2 Fighter, and in conjunction with his pilots, was credited with 12 confirmed aerial victories.

== First World War service ==
Boothroyd's initial aerial success with 20 Squadron came on 2 July 1918, when he destroyed a Fokker D.VII near Geluwe. On 11 August, he destroyed a kite balloon south of Heule. Then, on 20 September, he began a streak of ten victories that took him through double wins on 23 and 30 October; for this latter pair of double triumphs, he was piloted by fellow ace Capt.Horace Percy Lale. His final tally was: one balloon busted, one Fokker D.VII set afire in mid-air, nine others destroyed in flight, and one sent down out of control.

== Post-war ==
Boothroyd remained in the service post-war. On 1 August 1920, Observer Officer Clement Graham Boothroyd was mentioned in despatches by General C. C. Monro for exemplary service in Waziristan. On 12 December 1922, Boothroyd transferred to the Class A Reserve. Exactly four years later, he surrendered his commission.

== Honors and awards ==
The citation for his Distinguished Flying Cross reads as follows:

2nd Lieut. Clement Graham Boothroyd. (FRANCE) An officer of high courage. On 23 October, after attacking with bombs a railway station the formation with which this officer was flying was engaged with about fifteen enemy scouts; of these, he destroyed one and his pilot accounted for a second. In all he has to his credit eight enemy aircraft and one kite balloon.
