= Kevin Sharp (cricketer) =

English cricket coach and a former first-class cricketer (born 1959)

Personal information
- Full name: Kevin Sharp
- Born: 6 April 1959 (age 67); Leeds, Yorkshire, England
- Batting: Left-handed
- Bowling: Right-arm off break

Career statistics
Competition	First-class	List A
Matches	218	217
Runs scored	9,962	5,049
Batting average	30.84	27.44
100s/50s	14/47	3/30
Top score	181	114
Balls bowled	1,262	187
Wickets	12	6
Bowling average	73.91	28.83
5 wickets in innings	0	0
10 wickets in match	0	0
Best bowling	2/13	4/40
Catches/stumpings	107/–	71/–
- Source: CricketArchive, 16 August 2022

Kevin Sharp (born 6 April 1959) is an English cricket coach and a former first-class cricketer. He was educated at Abbey Grange High School in Leeds.

He had a fourteen-year first-class career playing for Yorkshire County Cricket Club and Griqualand West cricket team. He was a left-handed batsman and bowled right-arm off-spin.

Unlike his contemporary David Gower, this curly haired left-handed batsman failed to do justice to his talent, and did not win the England cap predicted, after he scored 260* for England Young Cricketers in 1978.

Sharp made his first-class debut for Yorkshire County Cricket Club in 1976, and was awarded his cap in 1982. As well as Yorkshire, he spent three seasons with Griqualand West in South Africa between 1981 and 1984, playing seventeen first-class matches, and averaging just under 40.

After finishing his Yorkshire first-class career in 1990, Sharp played for Shropshire in the Minor Counties from 1993 to 1997, while playing club cricket for Bridgnorth, and Ossett in Yorkshire.

After retiring from the game he has worked as a batting coach for Yorkshire, and as an umpire. He was appointed as Head Coach of Worcestershire on 12 January 2018 in succession to Steve Rhodes.
