= Richard Boothroyd =

English cricketer (born 1944)

Personal information
- Full name: Richard Boothroyd
- Born: 25 November 1944 (age 81); Huddersfield, Yorkshire, England
- Batting: Right-handed
- Bowling: Right-arm fast-medium

Domestic team information
- Years: Team
- 1974–1980: Staffordshire

Career statistics
Competition	List A
Matches	2
Runs scored	0
Batting average	0.00
100s/50s	–/–
Top score	0
Balls bowled	144
Wickets	1
Bowling average	82.00
5 wickets in innings	–
10 wickets in match	–
Best bowling	1/50
Catches/stumpings	–/–
- Source: Cricinfo, 17 June 2011

Richard Boothroyd (born 25 November 1944) is a former English cricketer. Boothroyd was a right-handed batsman who bowled right-arm fast-medium. He was born in Huddersfield, Yorkshire.

Boothroyd made his debut for Staffordshire in the 1974 Minor Counties Championship against Northumberland. Boothroyd played Minor counties of English and Welsh cricket for Staffordshire 1974 to 1980, playing 27 Minor Counties Championship matches. In 1975, he made his List A debut against Leicestershire in the 1st round of Gillette Cup. He made a further List A appearance against Essex in the 1976 Gillette Cup. In his 2 List A matches, he took a single wicket at a cost of 82 runs.
