= Peter Swart (cricketer) =

Rhodesian cricketer (1946–2000)

Cricket information
- Batting: Right-handed
- Bowling: Right-arm medium

Career statistics
Competition	First-class	List A
Matches	167	82
Runs scored	6,093	1554
Batting average	25.60	25.47
100s/50s	6/33	0/10
Top score	122	85*
Balls bowled	21,880	3672
Wickets	370	89
Bowling average	25.31	25.14
5 wickets in innings	5	0
10 wickets in match	1	0
Best bowling	6/85	4/35
Catches/stumpings	114/–	19/–
- Source: Cricket Archive, 3 February 2023

Peter Douglas Swart (27 April 1946 - 13 March 2000) was a Rhodesian cricketer who played most of his cricket in South Africa for Western Province.

Born in Bulawayo, Swart was an all rounder. He played just one first class innings for Rhodesia in 1965 when he was dismissed for a duck and failed to take a wicket. However, he represented Western Province with distinction between 1967/68 and 1980/81. In both the 1978 and 1979 English summers he was an overseas player for Glamorgan and in the former season won their player of the year award. He had scored over 1000 runs during the season for the Welsh county and managed his career best of 122 against Worcestershire at Swansea.

Swart retired in 1985 having performed the double of 2000 runs and 200 wickets in the Currie Cup.
