= Andrew Kennedy (cricketer, born 1949) =

English cricketer

Personal information
- Full name: Andrew Kennedy
- Born: 4 November 1949 (age 77); Blackburn, Lancashire, England
- Batting: Left-handed
- Bowling: Right-arm medium

Domestic team information
- Years: Team
- 1984: Minor Counties
- 1983–1987: Dorset
- 1970–1982: Lancashire

Career statistics
Competition	FC	LA
Matches	150	154
Runs scored	6,298	4,010
Batting average	28.24	29.27
100s/50s	6/26	3/24
Top score	180	131
Balls bowled	786	463
Wickets	10	8
Bowling average	39.80	41.00
5 wickets in innings	–	–
10 wickets in match	–	–
Best bowling	3/58	2/1
Catches/stumpings	85/–	35/–
- Source: Cricinfo, 31 May 2010

Andrew Kennedy (born 4 November 1949) is a former English cricketer. Kennedy was a left-handed batsman and a right-arm medium pace bowler.

Kennedy made his first-class debut for Lancashire in the 1970 season against the touring Jamaicans. Kennedy would go on to represent the club 149 times in first-class matches from 1970 to 1982, where he would score 6,232 runs at a batting average of 28.19, with 6 centuries and 26 half centuries and a high score of 180.

Kennedy made his List-A debut for Lancashire against Sussex in the 1972 John Player League. During his time with Lancashire, he would also go onto win the 1975 Gillette Cup when Lancashire defeated Middlesex and in the same season he won the Young-Cricketer-of-the-Year award. Kennedy represented Lancashire in 147 List-A matches from 1972 to 1982, where he scored 3,903 runs at an average of 30.02. He made 3 centuries and 24 half centuries and made a high score of 131.

At the end of the 1982 season, he departed Lancashire after struggling for form over the previous seasons and joined Dorset, where from 1983 to 1987 he represented the county in the Minor Counties Championship, with his final game coming against Cornwall in 1987. He also represented Dorset in 3 List-A matches, with his final List-A match for Dorset coming in the 1987 NatWest Trophy against Hampshire.

As well as representing Lancashire and Dorset in one-day cricket, he also played 3 matches for a combined Minor Counties team in the 1983 Benson & Hedges Cup.
