= Robert Dwyer =

Robert Dwyer may refer to:

- R. Budd Dwyer (1939–1987), American politician who was the 30th Treasurer of Pennsylvania
- Robert Joseph Dwyer (1908–1976), American archbishop
- Bob Dwyer (born 1940), Australian rugby union coach
