= Michael J. Smith (cricketer) =

English cricketer

Mike Smith
Personal information
- Full name: Michael John Smith
- Born: 4 January 1942; Enfield, Middlesex, England
- Died: 12 November 2004 (aged 62); Enfield, London, England
- Batting: Right-handed
- Bowling: Slow left-arm orthodox

International information
- National side: England
- ODI debut: 5 September 1973 v West Indies
- Last ODI: 2 September 1974 v Pakistan

Domestic team information
- Years: Team
- 1959–1980: Middlesex

Career statistics
Competition	ODI	FC	LA
Matches	5	422	229
Runs scored	70	19,814	5,957
Batting average	14.00	31.65	26.95
100s/50s	0/0	40/86	4/30
Top score	31	181	123
Balls bowled	–	4,125	56
Wickets	–	57	2
Bowling average	–	32.73	27.50
5 wickets in innings	–	0	0
10 wickets in match	–	0	–
Best bowling	–	4/13	1/5
Catches/stumpings	1/–	218/–	61/–
- Source: Cricinfo, 3 November 2022

Michael John Smith (4 January 1942 – 12 November 2004) was an English cricketer, who played most of his cricket as an opening batsman for Middlesex County Cricket Club. Together with Mike Brearley he formed a successful opening partnership. He also played five One Day Internationals for England in 1973 and 1974.

In first-class cricket Smith made 19,814 runs at an average of 31.65 in a career that lasted from 1959 to 1980, a total that included 40 centuries. His highest score was 181 against Lancashire County Cricket Club at Old Trafford in 1967. Although he batted right-handed he took 57 wickets, with a bowling average of 32.73, with slow left-arm deliveries. He also took 218 catches in the field. In 1994 he became the official Scorer for Middlesex. In total Smith spent 22 seasons on the staff at Lord's Cricket Ground.

He was educated at Enfield Grammar School. Smith was twice married and had three daughters, Debbie, Libby, Emma, and a son, Jonathan.

== Quotations ==
Mike Brearley, Smith's fellow opening batsman at Middlesex, in his book The Art of Captaincy wrote about how Smith prepared for his innings: "Mike Smith would be having his last-minute 'net' in front of the dressing-room mirror. He clicks his tongue on the roof of his mouth to represent ball on bat as he plays an immaculate forward defensive shot." He also recalled Smith's approach to batting: "You can never trust bowlers: they develop something new each year".
