= Tony Brown (English cricketer) =

English cricketer and administrator (1936–2020)

Personal information
- Full name: Anthony Stephen Brown
- Born: 24 June 1936; Clifton, Bristol
- Died: 27 May 2020 (aged 83)
- Batting: Right-handed
- Bowling: Right-arm fast-medium

Domestic team information
- Years: Team
- 1953–1976: Gloucestershire

Career statistics
Competition	First-class	List A
Matches	496	164
Runs scored	12,851	2,017
Batting average	18.12	17.69
100s/50s	3/41	0/2
Top score	116	77*
Balls bowled	71,576	7,626
Wickets	1,230	230
Bowling average	25.64	20.62
5 wickets in innings	54	1
10 wickets in match	8	0
Best bowling	8/80	5/44
Catches/stumpings	496/–	68/–
- Source: CricketArchive (subscription required), 27 May 2020

Anthony Stephen Brown (24 June 1936 – 27 May 2020) was an English cricketer and administrator.

A middle to lower order right-handed batsman and a medium-fast right-arm bowler, Tony Brown was a successful county cricketer with Gloucestershire County Cricket Club for 20 years and was county captain between 1969 and 1976. He joined the club as a teenager running errands, among other duties, for Tom Graveney.

Initially used primarily as an opening bowler for a county that had traditionally relied heavily on spin bowling, Brown took more than 100 wickets in both the 1959 and 1962 seasons and formed an effective new-ball partnership with the England Test player David Smith, used before the Test spin trio of David Allen, John Mortimore and Sam Cook were brought into action. His best bowling figures of 8 for 80 came against Essex at Leyton in 1963, his victims including Trevor Bailey and Keith Fletcher.

Later in his career, his batting developed significantly, and he passed 1,000 runs in the 1964 season. He was also an excellent close fielder, and in 1966, playing for Gloucestershire against Nottinghamshire at Trent Bridge, he held seven catches in an innings, equalling the world record for a fielder set in 1957 by Micky Stewart. In his first-class cricket career, he scored more than 12,000 runs and took more than 1,200 wickets, holding 493 catches. His highest score of 116 was made against Somerset at Bristol in 1971.

Brown was Man of the Match in the 1973 Gillette Cup final, when he became the first Gloucestershire captain to win a major trophy since 1877.

As an administrator, he succeeded Grahame Parker as Secretary of Gloucestershire on his retirement from first-class cricket in 1976. In 1982 he became Secretary of Somerset, a post that he held for six years, during one of the more turbulent periods in the county's history, with the decision not to retain Garner and Richards, and the subsequent departure of Ian Botham upsetting many of the club's supporters. In 1984 he was appointed Manager of the England Team that toured India and Australia in 1984/85 when the Test Series v India was won 2–1, by the team captained by David Gower and the ODI Series by 4–1; India were World ODI Cup Champions at that time. He was also Manager of the England Tour which toured West Indies in 1986. In 1988 he succeeded Brian Langley as Administration Secretary of the then TCCB (Test and County Cricket Board), now ECB (England and Wales Cricket Board) until his retirement in 1997. He was Chairman of Cricket at Gloucestershire County Cricket Club from 1999 until 2007 and President of Gloucestershire County Cricket Club from 2008 to 2011, when he was succeeded by his former team-mate, David Allen. He was nominated by the club's supporters to be featured in the Gloucestershire Legends Walkway at the County ground which is due to be installed before the start of the 2021 season.

Tony Brown died on 27 May 2020.
