= Peter Lee (cricketer) =

English cricketer (1945–2026)

Personal information
- Full name: Peter Granville Lee
- Born: 27 August 1945; Arthingworth, Northamptonshire, England
- Died: 28 January 2026 (aged 80)
- Batting: Right-handed
- Bowling: Right-arm fast-medium

Career statistics
Competition	First-class	List A
Matches	202	190
Runs scored	779	149
Batting average	8.11	6.77
100s/50s	0/0	0/0
Top score	26	27*
Balls bowled	33,369	8,743
Wickets	599	230
Bowling average	25.60	22.53
5 wickets in innings	29	0
10 wickets in match	7	0
Best bowling	8/34	4/7
Catches/stumpings	29/–	25/–
- Source: CricketArchive, 11 October 2024

Peter Granville Lee (27 August 1945 – 28 January 2026), known as "Leapy", was an English cricketer who played for Northamptonshire and Lancashire County Cricket Clubs. He was a right-arm fast-medium bowler who moved the ball off the seam and became among the most effective bowlers in English county cricket during the 1970s. In 1975 he became the last Lancashire bowler to take 100 wickets in a season and was chosen as one of Wisden’s five Cricketers of the Year. He never played international cricket but did tour South Africa twice with teams organised by Derrick Robins.

Born at Arthingworth, Northamptonshire, Lee played for five seasons from 1967 for Northamptonshire without ever becoming a regular in the side. He moved to Lancashire in 1972 largely as insurance for the likelihood that regular opening bowlers Peter Lever and Ken Shuttleworth would be called up for Test cricket by England, but with those bowlers doing badly, Lee became their first choice opening bowler. 1973 saw Lee surpass his first season's promise and become the mainstay of Lancashire's bowling, actually taking more wickets in the County Championship than any other bowler.

In 1974 Lee was consistently handicapped by injuries and illness: he played about half his county's matches but was at no point fully fit. Nevertheless, he returned for a full season and even greater success in 1975. His 112 first-class wickets was the highest by any bowler that season: indeed the highest by any England-qualified bowler during the 1970s. He was named as a Wisden Cricketer of the Year in the 1976 edition of the almanack.

Having reached the top of the tree as a bowler, Lee remained one of the most persistent and hard-working county bowlers during 1976 and 1977, though he took only two-thirds as many wickets as he did in 1975. However, 1978 saw Lee play only one match due to a serious shoulder injury, which led to a delayed operation after weeks of examination. Lee made a "gallant" return to fitness in 1979 but completely lost form, finishing with 22 wickets for 40 runs apiece that season. He took a career-best eight for 34 against Oxford University in 1980. He dismissed Geoffrey Boycott in the 1982 Roses Match which ended up being the last of his 599 first class wickets, and at the end of 1982 he was released by Lancashire. After that, he played for Durham in the Minor Counties Championship during the 1983 season, but took only 16 wickets for 29.56 apiece and was released.

In 2024, Lee was inducted into the Lancashire Cricket Hall of Fame. His death was announced by Lancashire on 29 January 2026. Lee was 80.
