= Staffordshire County Cricket Club =

English cricket club

Team information
- Colours
- Founded: 1871

History
- National Counties Cricket Championship wins: 11
- NCCA Knockout Trophy wins: 2
- Official website: Staffordshire CCC

Staffordshire County Cricket Club is one of twenty national county clubs within the domestic cricket structure of England and Wales. It represents the historic county of Staffordshire. The team is currently a member of the National Counties Championship Eastern Division and plays in the NCCA Knockout Trophy. Staffordshire played List A matches occasionally from 1971 until 2005 but is not classified as a List A team per se.

== History ==
The earliest known reference to cricket being played in Staffordshire is as late as 1817. The present Staffordshire county club was founded on 24 November 1871 and took part in the first Minor Counties Championship in 1895. Membership then lapsed for four years as the club could not arrange sufficient fixtures, but it has been a member continuously since 1900.

Staffordshire has won the Minor/National Counties Championship 11 times, more than any other county. It won the title outright in 1906, 1908, 1911, 1920, 1921, 1927, 1991, 1992, 1993, 1998 and 2014. The 1914 title was disputed as the war prevented several matches from being played, and is regarded by the NCCA as void. Staffordshire's years of great success before and after the First World War were in part due to the great bowler, Sydney Barnes, who played for the county from 1904 to 1914 and from 1924 to 1934 (when he was 61). He took 1,441 wickets at an average of 8.15 runs each. However, Barnes did not play for the county in 1920 or 1921, two of Staffordshire's title-winning seasons. The leading player then was Aaron Lockett. The most recent title in 2014 was won after a play-off final against the Western Division league leaders, Wiltshire, at the South Wilts Sports Club ground in Salisbury. Staffordshire has won the NCCA Knockout Trophy twice (1991 and 1993) since its inception in 1983.

=== Honours ===
- Minor/National Counties Championship (11): 1906, 1908, 1911, 1920, 1921, 1927, 1991, 1992, 1993, 1998 & 2014
- NCCA Knockout Trophy (2): 1991 & 1993 (runners-up in 1992, 2009 & 2016)

== County grounds ==
See List of Staffordshire County Cricket Club grounds

The club has always played its matches at club grounds around the county. It began playing at the old County Ground on Victoria Road in Stoke-on-Trent. That closed before the Second World War. In recent years, some of the grounds have been:

- Four Trees, Uttoxeter Road, Checkley (starting in 2017, home of Checkley CC)
- Lichfield Road, Stone (home of Stone SPCC)
- Sandwell Park, Birmingham Road, West Bromwich (home of West Bromwich Dartmouth CC)
- Trentham Road, Longton, Stoke-on-Trent (home of Longton CC)
- Tunstall Road, Knypersley, Stoke-on-Trent (home of Knypersley Victoria SC)

== Notable players ==
See List of Staffordshire County Cricket Club List A players and Category:Staffordshire cricketers

The following cricketers with Staffordshire associations (club and/or county) made an impact on the first-class game:

- Rob Bailey
- Sydney Barnes
- Kim Barnett
- Dilip Vengsarkar
- Joey Benjamin
- Dominic Cork
- Brian Crump
- Ken Higgs
- Jack Ikin
- Imran Tahir
- Vincent Lindo
- Nasim-ul-Ghani
- Charles Palmer
- Ernest Perry
- David Steele
- John Steele
- Bob Taylor
