= 1982 NatWest Trophy =

- Administrator: Test and County Cricket Board
- Cricket format: Limited overs cricket (60 overs per innings)
- Tournament format: Knockout
- Champions: Surrey (1st title)
- Participants: 23
- Matches: 22
- Most runs: 263 David Smith (Surrey)
- Most wickets: 12 Robin Jackman (Surrey)

The 1982 NatWest Trophy was an English limited overs county cricket tournament which was held between 3 July and 4 September 1982. It was the 2nd NatWest Trophy, after it had been renamed from the Gillette Cup the previous year. The tournament was won by Surrey who defeated Warwickshire by 9 wickets in the final at Lord's.

== Format ==
The seventeen first-class counties, were joined by five Minor Counties: Bedfordshire, Cambridgeshire, Cheshire, Durham and Norfolk. The Ireland national cricket team also participated. Teams who won in the first round progressed to the second round. The winners in the second round then progressed to the quarter-final stage. Winners from the quarter-finals then progressed to the semi-finals from which the winners then went on to the final at Lord's which was held on 4 September 1982.

=== First round ===
3 July 1982
(scorecard)

Bedfordshire; 153/9 (60 overs)	v	Somerset; 154/6 (48.2 overs)
Andrew Pearson 39; Viv Richards 3/15 (9 overs)		Vic Marks 31; Steven Lines 3/28 (10 overs)

Somerset won by 4 wickets
Goldington Bury, Bedford
Umpires: Jack Birkenshaw & Don Oslear
Player of the match: Rodney Dethridge (Bedfordshire)

3 July 1982
(scorecard)

Norfolk; 164/7 (60 overs)	v	Leicestershire; 166/2 (48.2 overs)
Pervez Mir 55; Les Taylor 4/34 (12 overs)		David Gower 65*; Terry Barnes 1/34 (12 overs)

Leicestershire won by 8 wickets
Grace Road, Leicester
Umpires: David Constant & David Evans
Player of the match: David Gower (Leicestershire)

3 July 1982
(scorecard)

Cheshire; 104 all out (51 overs)	v	Middlesex; 106/2 (31.3 overs)
Ian Gemmell 20*; Phil Edmonds 5/12 (12 overs)		Wilf Slack 54*; Neil O'Brien 1/16 (6 overs)

Middlesex won by 8 wickets
Lincoln Road, Enfield
Umpires: Roy Palmer & Nigel Plews
Player of the match: Phil Edmonds (Middlesex)

3 July 1982
(scorecard)

Ireland; 155 all out (56.3 overs)	v	Northamptonshire; 156/3 (39.5 overs)
Jack Short 37; Tim Lamb 3/25 (8.3 overs)		Peter Willey 72*; Simon Corlett 2/34 (12 overs)

Northamptonshire won by 7 wickets
County Ground, Northampton
Umpires: Barrie Leadbeater & Ken Palmer
Player of the match: Peter Willey (Northamptonshire)

3 July 1982
(scorecard)

Surrey; 279/7 (60 overs)	v	Durham; 168/6 (60 overs)
Monte Lynch 129 (143); Simon Davis 5/51 (12 overs)		Stephen Greensword 73 (155); David Thomas 3/16 (10 overs)

Surrey won by 111 runs
The Oval, London
Umpires: Bob Herman & Khalid Ibadulla
Player of the match: Monte Lynch (Surrey)

3 July 1982
(scorecard)

Sussex; 113 all out (50.1 overs)	v	Nottinghamshire; 114/1 (29.4 overs)
Allan Green 41; Clive Rice 6/18 (11.1 overs)		Tim Robinson 44*; Ian Greig 1/37 (10 overs)

Nottinghamshire won by 9 wickets
County Ground, Hove
Umpires: Mervyn Kitchen & Terry Spencer
Player of the match: Clive Rice (Nottinghamshire)

3 July 1982
(scorecard)

Warwickshire; 300/6 (60 overs)	v	Cambridgeshire; 180 all out (50.1 overs)
Dennis Amiss 135; Derek Wing 3/50 (12 overs)		Michael McEvoy 52; Simon Sutcliffe 3/40 (10 overs)

Warwickshire won by 120 runs
Edgbaston, Birmingham
Umpires: Sam Cook & Peter Eele
Player of the match: Dennis Amiss (Warwickshire)

=== Second round ===
14 July 1982
(scorecard)

Essex; 269/7 (60 overs)	v	Kent; 139 all out (41 overs)
Keith Fletcher 97; Derek Underwood 3/40 (12 overs)		Laurie Potter 45; Stuart Turner 4/23 (12 overs)

Essex won by 130 runs
County Ground, Chelmsford
Umpires: Ray Julian & Terry Spencer
Player of the match: Keith Fletcher (Essex)

14, 15 July 1982
(scorecard)

Glamorgan; 169 all out (60 overs)	v	Warwickshire; 170/4 (57 overs)
Rodney Ontong 54; Gladstone Small 3/22 (12 overs)		Andy Lloyd 52; Malcolm Nash 2/14 (10 overs)

Warwickshire won by 6 wickets
Sophia Gardens, Cardiff
Umpires: Dickie Bird & Peter Eele
Player of the match: Andy Lloyd (Warwickshire)

- Match was scheduled for one day but extended to two.

14 July 1982
(scorecard)

Derbyshire; 239/5 (60 overs)	v	Hampshire; 242/4 (56.4 overs)
Peter Kirsten 110*; Trevor Jesty 2/28 (12 overs)		Gordon Greenidge 83; Barry Wood 3/23 (12 overs)

Hampshire won by 6 wickets
County Ground, Southampton
Umpires: Bill Alley & Ken Palmer
Player of the match: Peter Kirsten (Derbyshire)

14, 15, 16 July 1982
(scorecard)

Middlesex; 204/9 (60 overs)	v	Lancashire; 202/9 (60 overs)
Mike Brearley 66; Paul Allott 3/26 (12 overs)		David Lloyd 48; Norman Cowans 4/26 (12 overs)

Middlesex won by 2 runs
Lord's, London
Umpires: Sam Cook & Arthur Jepson
Player of the match: Norman Cowans (Middlesex)

- Match was scheduled for one day but extended to three.

14, 15 July 1982
(scorecard)

Nottinghamshire; 142 all out (45 overs)	v	Gloucestershire; 145/1 (51.4 overs)
Basher Hassan 27; John Shepherd 3/16 (12 overs)		Andy Stovold 76*; Kevin Cooper 1/21 (12 overs)

Gloucestershire won by 9 wickets
Trent Bridge, Nottingham
Umpires: Jack Birkenshaw & Jack van Geloven
Player of the match: Andy Stovold (Gloucestershire)

- Match was scheduled for one day but extended to two.

14, 15 July 1982
(scorecard)

Somerset; 271/5 (60 overs)	v	Leicestershire; 208/9 (60 overs)
Peter Denning 73; Les Taylor 2/55 (12 overs)		David Gower 60; Joel Garner 4/12 (12 overs)

Somerset won by 63 runs
County Ground, Taunton
Umpires: Khalid Ibadulla & David Shepherd
Player of the match: Vic Marks (Somerset)

- Match was scheduled for one day but extended to two.

14, 15, 16 July 1982
(scorecard)

Northamptonshire; 239/5 (60 overs)	v	Surrey; 242/4 (58.5 overs)
Peter Willey 55; Sylvester Clarke 1/34 (2 overs)		David Smith 103*; Peter Willey 1/29 (12 overs)

Surrey won by 6 wickets
The Oval, London
Umpires: David Evans & Barrie Meyer
Player of the match: David Smith (Surrey)

- Match was scheduled for one day but extended to three.

14, 15 July 1982
(scorecard)

Worcestershire; 286/5 (60 overs)	v	Yorkshire; 290/7 (59.3 overs)
Glenn Turner 105; Geoff Boycott 2/35 (8 overs)		David Bairstow 92; John Inchmore 4/47 (12 overs)

Yorkshire won by 3 wickets
Headingley, Leeds
Umpires: Bob Herman & Don Oslear
Player of the match: David Bairstow (Yorkshire)

- Match was scheduled for one day but extended to two.

=== Quarter-finals ===
4 August 1982
(scorecard)

Middlesex; 215/9 (60 overs)	v	Gloucestershire; 212/8 (60 overs)
Clive Radley 45; John Childs 2/43 (12 overs)		Chris Broad 98; Norman Cowans 2/33 (12 overs)

Middlesex won by 3 runs
Phoenix County Ground, Bristol
Umpires: Dickie Bird & Alan Whitehead
Player of the match: Chris Broad (Nottinghamshire)

4 August 1982
(scorecard)

Hampshire; 119 all out (45.2 overs)	v	Surrey; 120/2 (33.2 overs)
David Turner 52; Robin Jackman 6/22 (10.2 overs)		David Smith 62*; Kevin Emery 1/26 (6 overs)

Surrey won by 8 wickets
County Ground, Southampton
Umpires: Bill Alley & Barrie Meyer
Player of the match: Robin Jackman (Surrey)

4, 5 August 1982
(scorecard)

Somerset; 259/9 (60 overs)	v	Warwickshire; 261/5 (53.3 overs)
Ian Botham 85; Anton Ferreira 4/53 (12 overs)		Alvin Kallicharran 141*; Colin Dredge 2/48 (7.3 overs)

Warwickshire won by 5 wickets
County Ground, Taunton
Umpires: Lloyd Budd & David Constant
Player of the match: Alvin Kallicharran (Warwickshire)

- Match was scheduled for one day but extended to two.

4 August 1982
(scorecard)

Essex; 132 all out (56.5 overs)	v	Yorkshire; 133/1 (39 overs)
Stuart Turner 50*; Arnie Sidebottom 3/21 (12 overs)		Martyn Moxon 78*; Keith Pont 1/27 (4.2 overs)

Yorkshire won by 9 wickets
Headingley, Leeds
Umpires: Arthur Jepson & Ray Julian
Player of the match: Martyn Moxon (Yorkshire)

=== Semi-finals ===
18, 19 August 1982
(scorecard)

Surrey; 205/9 (60 overs)	v	Middlesex; 80 all out (41.5 overs)
Alan Butcher 53; Wayne Daniel 4/24 (8 overs)		Roland Butcher 21; Sylvester Clarke 4/10 (7 overs)

Surrey won by 125 runs
The Oval, London
Umpires: David Shepherd & Alan Whitehead
Player of the match: Sylvester Clarke (Surrey)

- Match was scheduled for one day but extended to two.

18 August 1982
(scorecard)

Yorkshire; 216/9 (60 overs)	v	Warwickshire; 219/3 (59.5 overs)
Geoff Boycott 51; Anton Ferreira 3/34 (12 overs)		David Smith 113; Phil Carrick 2/35 (9 overs)

Warwickshire won by 7 wickets
Edgbaston, Birmingham
Umpires: Roy Palmer & Peter Wight
Player of the match: David Smith (Warwickshire)

=== Final ===
4 September 1982
(scorecard)

Warwickshire; 158 all out (57.2 overs)	v	Surrey; 159/1 (33.4 overs)
Asif Din 45 (111); David Thomas 3/26 (11 overs)		Alan Butcher 86* (128); Christopher Lethbridge 1/23 (6 overs)

Surrey won by 9 wickets
Lord's, London
Umpires: Dickie Bird & Barrie Meyer
Player of the match: David Thomas (Surrey)
