= List of Middlesex County Cricket Club grounds =

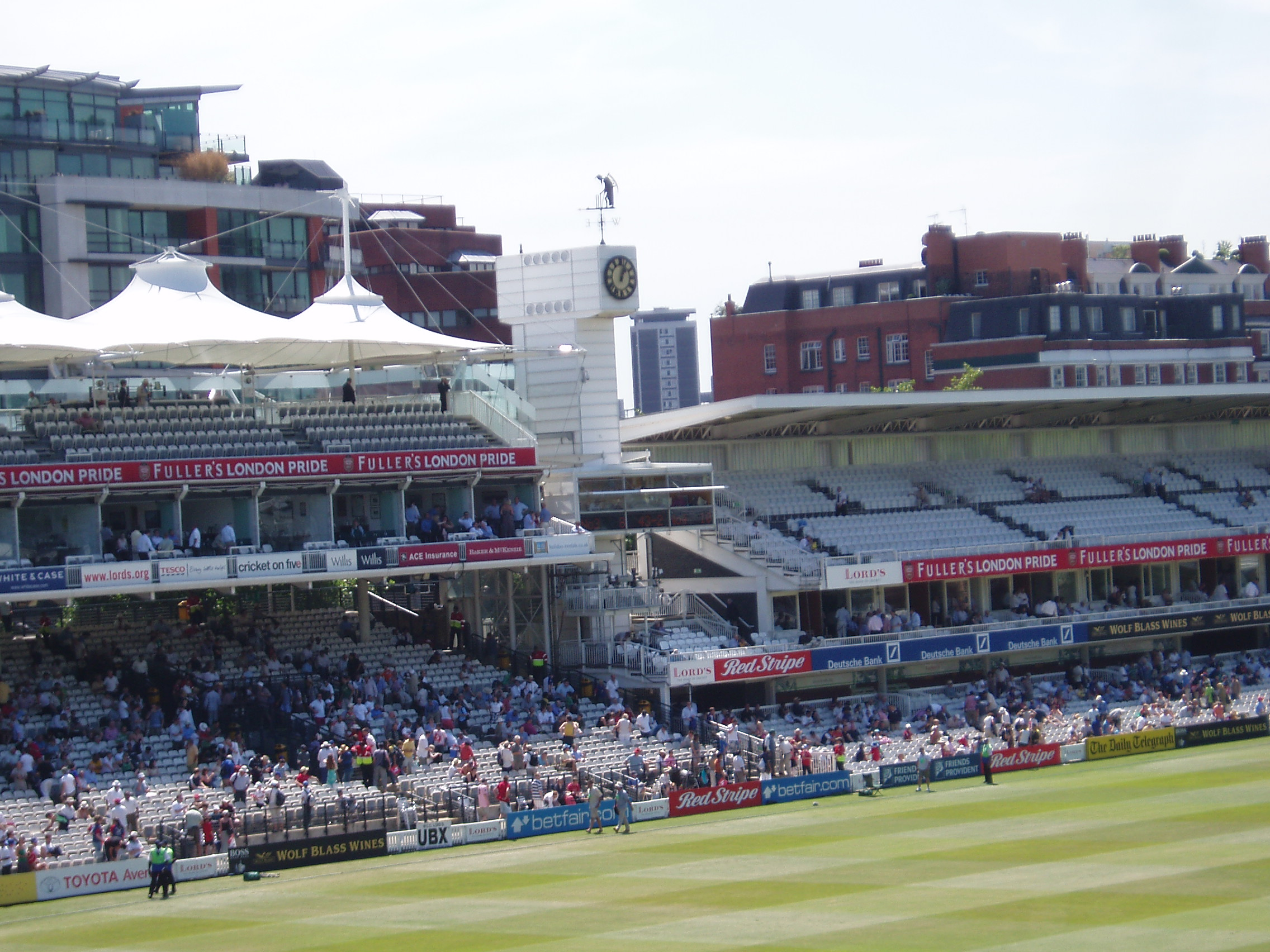
Lord's became Middlesex's home ground in 1869. It is often referred to as "the home of cricket".

Middlesex County Cricket Club was established on 2 February 1864; before then there had been an informal county team, which had played first-class cricket from 1787. Middlesex County Cricket Club has played first-class cricket from 1864, List A cricket from 1963 and Twenty20 cricket from 2003,^{[A]} using a number of home grounds during that time. The Cattle Market Ground in Islington hosted the club's first home fixture in first-class cricket against Sussex in 1864; Lord's in St John's Wood hosted the club's first home List A match against Northamptonshire in 1963; and the club's first home fixture in Twenty20 cricket against Kent in 2003 was at the Old Deer Park in Richmond. Middlesex have played home matches at fourteen grounds, but have played the majority of their home fixtures at Lord's, which also holds Test, One Day International and Twenty20 International cricket matches.

The administrative county of Middlesex ceased to exist in 1965 when its county council was dissolved, and the majority of the county club's grounds are now in Greater London.

== Grounds ==
Below is a complete list of grounds used by Middlesex County Cricket Club for first-class, List A and Twenty20 matches. Statistics are complete through to the end of the 2014 season. Only matches played by Middlesex CCC at the grounds are recorded in the table. Matches abandoned without any play occurring are not included.

Name	Location	First	Last	Matches	First	Last	Matches	First	Last	Matches	Refs
Name	Location	First-class			List A			Twenty20			Refs
Cattle Market Ground	Islington	6 June 1864 v Sussex	20 August 1868 v Surrey	16	–	–	0	–	–	0	(Note: Only the first-class matches played at the ground by Middlesex are recorded in the table.)
Lord's	St John's Wood	12 July 1869 v Surrey	9 September 2014 v Durham	1,332	12 June 1963 v Northamptonshire	14 August 2014 v Nottinghamshire	441	15 July 2004 v Surrey	24 July 2014 v Surrey	32	(Note: Only the first-class, List A and Twenty20 matches played at the ground by Middlesex following the county club's formation in 1864 are recorded in the table.)
Lillie Bridge	West Brompton	18 May 1871 v Surrey	Ground defunct	1	–	–	0	–	–	0	(Note: The Gentlemen of the North and the Gentlemen of the South played one first-class match here in 1871. Only the first-class match played at the ground by Middlesex is recorded in the table.)
Prince's Cricket Ground	Chelsea	23 May 1872 v Yorkshire	10 July 1876 v Nottinghamshire	18	–	–	0	–	–	0	(Note: Only the first-class matches played at the ground by Middlesex are recorded in the table.)
Chiswick Park	Chiswick	23 June 1887 v Oxford University	no other matches to date	1	–	–	0	–	–	0	(Note: CI Thornton's XI played a first-class match here against the touring Australians in 1886. Only the first-class match played at the ground by Middlesex is recorded in the table.)
Tivoli Road	Hornsey	8 July 1959 v Hampshire	no other matches to date	1	–	–	0	–	–	0	
Uxbridge Cricket Club Ground	Uxbridge	20 August 1980 v Derbyshire	7 July 2014 v Somerset	45	17 May 1983 v Glamorgan	5 August 2012 v Worcestershire	20	23 June 2003 v Hampshire	7 July 2013 v Kent	12	
Woodside	Watford	–	–	0	25 June 1981 v Sri Lankans	no other matches to date	1	–	–	0	(Note: Woodside is located in the adjacent county of Hertfordshire. Minor Counties West, Minor Counties South, and a combined Minor Counties cricket team played four List A matches here between 1977–1980. Only the List A match played at the ground by Middlesex is recorded in the table.)
Lincoln Road	Enfield	–	–	0	3 July 1982 v Cheshire	no other matches to date	1	–	–	0	
John Walker's Ground	Southgate	26 June 1998 v Essex	28 April 2009 v Leicestershire	20	2 June 1991 v Kent	3 May 2009 v Kent	20	12 July 2004 v Essex	10 July 2011 v Somerset	5	(Note: Prior to the formation of Middlesex County Cricket Club in 1864, a team representative of Middlesex played a first-class match here against Kent in 1859. Only the first-class matches played at the ground by Middlesex are recorded in the table. The Middlesex Cricket Board played seven List A matches here between 1999–2002. Only the List A matches played at the ground by Middlesex are recorded in the table.)
Old Deer Park	Richmond	–	–	0	28 August 2000 v Nottinghamshire	5 July 2004 v Scotland	4	19 June 2003 v Kent	3 July 2014 v Glamorgan	9	(Note: The Old Deer Park was historically located in the adjacent county of Surrey until 1965. Surrey have also played Second XI games here. The Middlesex Cricket Board played a single List A match here against Berkshire in the 2001 Cheltenham & Gloucester Trophy. Only the List A matches played at the ground by Middlesex are recorded in the table.)
Denis Compton Oval	Shenley	11 May 2002 v Sri Lankans	30 May 2003 v Zimbabweans	2	15 September 2002 v Lancashire	25 May 2003 v Northamptonshire	2	–	–	0	(Note: The Denis Compton Oval is located in the adjacent county of Hertfordshire. The Marylebone Cricket Club played three first-class matches here between 1996–1999, while the ground played host to a first-class match between Sri Lanka A and the touring West Indians in 2004. Only the first-class matches played at the ground by Middlesex are recorded in the table. The Marylebone Cricket Club also played a single List A match here against the touring Pakistanis in 1996. Only the List A matches played at the ground by Middlesex are recorded in the table.)
Merchant Taylors' School	Northwood	31 March 2012 v Durham MCCU	no other matches to date	1	–	–	0	25 May 2014 v Hampshire	no other matches to date	1	
Brunton Memorial Ground	Radlett	–	–	0	27 May 2013 v Yorkshire	no other matches to date	1	–	–	0	(Note: Brunton Memorial Ground is located in the adjacent county of Hertfordshire. Hertfordshire played two List A matches at the ground in the 1999 NatWest Trophy. Only the List A match played at the ground by Middlesex is recorded in the table.)

Middlesex played a home game against Somerset at the County Ground Chelmsford, Essex in August 1977; the match having been scheduled for the previous week at Lord's but postponed due to a rearrangement of a one-day cup semi-final.

The Middlesex v Notts game on 15/18 July 1939 was played at the Kennington Oval due to rescheduling of games due to the preparations for an imminent war.

== Notes ==
A. First-class cricket matches are designed to be contested over multiple days, with each team permitted two innings with no limit to the number of overs in an innings. List A matches are intended to be completed in a single day and restrict each team to a single innings of between 40 and 60 overs, depending on the specific competition. Twenty20 matches restrict each team to a single innings of 20 overs.
