= Firfield Community School =

School in Newcastle upon Tyne, England

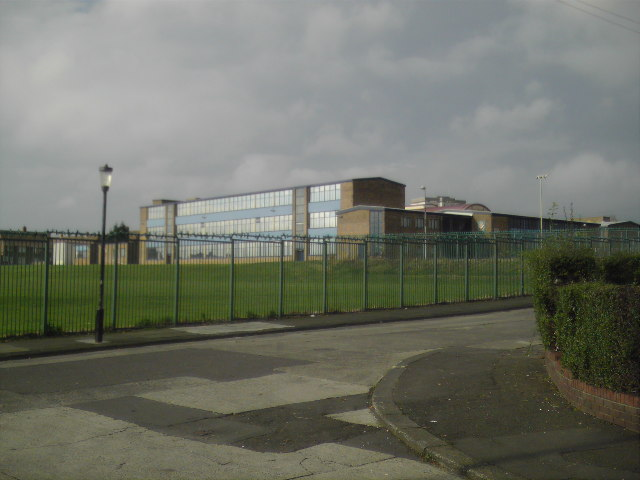

Location
- Firfield Road, Blakelaw; Newcastle upon Tyne, Tyne and Wear, NE5 3HU; England, United Kingdom; 54.9960°N 1.6660°W

Information
- Type: Community school
- Established: 1998 (Fresh Start)
- Closed: 2002
- Local authority: Newcastle City Council
- Department for Education URN: 131985 Tables
- Head teacher: Russ Wallace
- Gender: Mixed
- Age: 11 to 18
- Enrolment: 410
- Capacity: 700

Firfield Community School was an 11 to 18 mixed, community secondary school in the Blakelaw ward of Newcastle upon Tyne, in the English county of Tyne and Wear. It received prominence in the media as the first school to relaunch under the Fresh Start programme; a government initiative where failing schools reopen with renovations and new names, staff and headteachers. Firfield reopened in September 1998, replacing the failed Blakelaw Comprehensive School, which had been considered by Channel 4 and the government to be "the worst school in Britain". The school closed in 2002 after a financial deficit and decline in student numbers.

== History ==
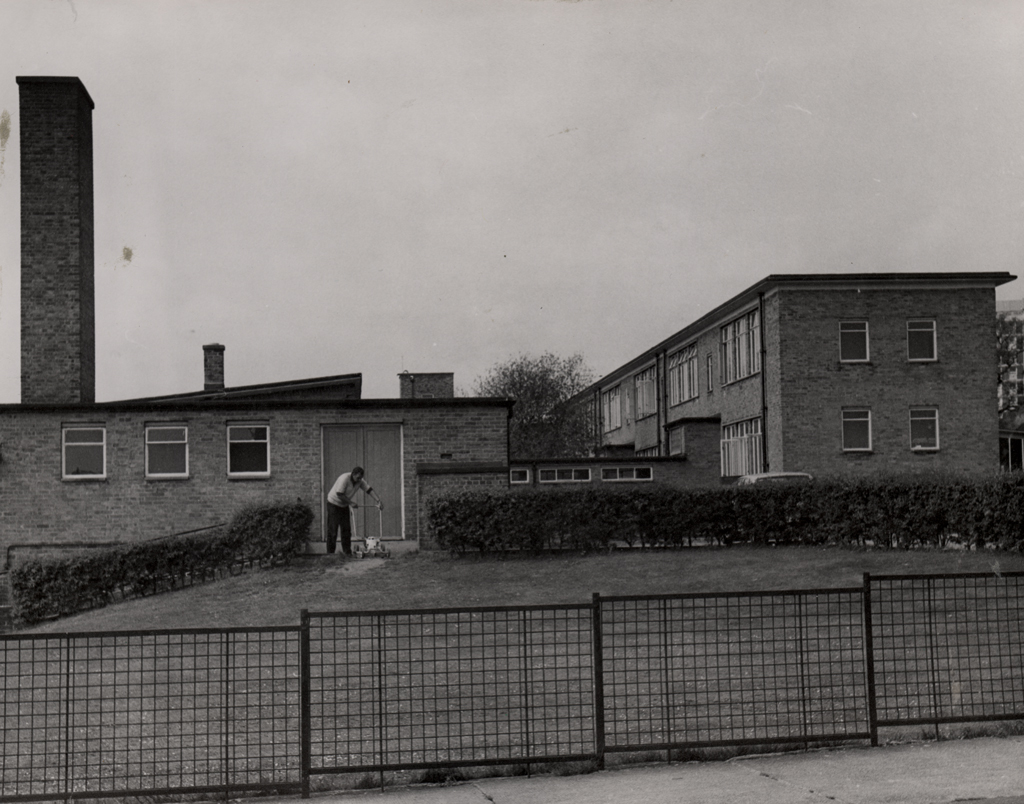
Blakelaw Comprehensive in 1971

=== Blakelaw Comprehensive School ===
Blakelaw Comprehensive dates back to the early 1950s. The school was legally called Firfield County Secondary School until November 1967, when it was legally renamed to Blakelaw School. It retained this legal name until it reopened as Firfield Community School in September 1998.

In 1997, the newly elected Labour government's education secretary David Blunkett named 18 schools which he believed were the country's worst, including Blakelaw Comprehensive School. Newcastle City Council had planned to close the school in Summer 1997, but these plans were dropped after over 250 of its students staged a protest in March 1997.

The government announced a plan to improve the 18 schools by providing them with expertise from successful advisory headteachers and staff. Blakelaw was given William Atkinson, the headteacher of Phoenix High School. Phoenix High School was previously failing but Atkinson gave the school a "fresh start" and brought it to successful standards. This would form the rationale for the government's Fresh Start programme. Atkinson worked with Russ Wallace, the new headteacher of Blakelaw Comprehensive, to bring changes to its curriculum and decrease illiteracy.

In November 1997, the school was still open and Newcastle City Council applied to have it join the Fresh Start programme. The application was approved and the school reopened in September 1998 under new leadership as Firfield Community School, therefore making it the first Fresh Start school in the country.

=== Firfield Community School ===
Firfield Community School was in receipt of an extra £1.5 million in funding through the Fresh Start programme. Two thirds of the staff were replaced and a new headteacher, Carol McAlpine, was appointed. Russ Wallace had applied to keep the post but instead became one of two deputies (the other being Lynne Ackland). The new regime evaluated its students and found that 80% of Year 7 students had a reading age below their actual age and that 46% of all students in Years 7, 8 and 9 combined had a reading age that was four years below average. As a result, the curriculum was modified to focus on English and mathematics. An average of around 129 students were absent every day out of a population of 411. The school was given a deadline of five years to reduce absence and truancy, along with illiteracy and innumeracy, and had to have over 700 students enrolled within three years to receive more Fresh Start funding.

Headteacher McAlpine agreed to allow Channel 4 to film a six-episode television documentary about the Fresh Start programme throughout Firfield's first school year. The documentary was named Making the Grade and was filmed in fly on the wall format. It was broadcast weekly in November and December 1999 on Channel 4's Sunday prime time slot. Included in the documentary was a visit by schools minister Estelle Morris, who congratulated McAlpine for bringing some improvements to the school in only eight months. Morris previously visited the school at its reopening. Other improvements included a 17% rise in attendance from 70% to 87% and an increasing number of successful GCSE results. Despite this, the documentary proved detrimental to the school's reputation and morale. This led to a reduction of students enrolling to the school, meaning that further Fresh Start funding could no longer be received, thereby resulting in two teachers possibly being sacked due to staff cuts.

In March 2000, without informing the school's governing body, Carol McAlpine abruptly resigned from her post in order to take over an education action zone in Norfolk. She cited "unrealistic targets" as the reason for her resignation. Another believed reason was off-rolling, which had been done by the school to remove troublesome students. Deputy headteacher Russ Wallace took her post, a position he previously held as the last headteacher of Blakelaw Comprehensive. The council offered a £70,000 salary for a new, permanent headteacher, but when one arrived Wallace and his new deputy declined the support. They claimed that bringing improvement to the school "required a team effort, not the supposed magic of one individual". After McAlpine's resignation, the general secretary of the teaching union NASUWT, Nigel de Gruchy, disclosed that Firfield's teachers nearly went on strike six weeks prior due to students' misbehaviour. However, inspectors concluded that behaviour had improved and instead criticised the school's continued absence, innumeracy and inconsistent teaching.

In April 2000, it was reported that Newcastle City Council had considered closing Firfield. Negotiations between the council, school governors and the Department for Education and Employment began. By this time, the school had experienced a financial deficit of £200,000 due to a continued decline in student numbers. In May, the council consulted parents with plans to close both Firfield and the neighbouring West Denton School. If they agreed, the plans would go ahead.

By 2002, Firfield Community School had attained a good Ofsted report. Despite this, plans had materialised for the school and West Denton to be replaced by a new school named All Saints College in September. Like Blakelaw Comprehensive, Firfield and West Denton were closed and given a fresh start as the unified All Saints College. The new school was situated on West Denton's site.

== Campus ==
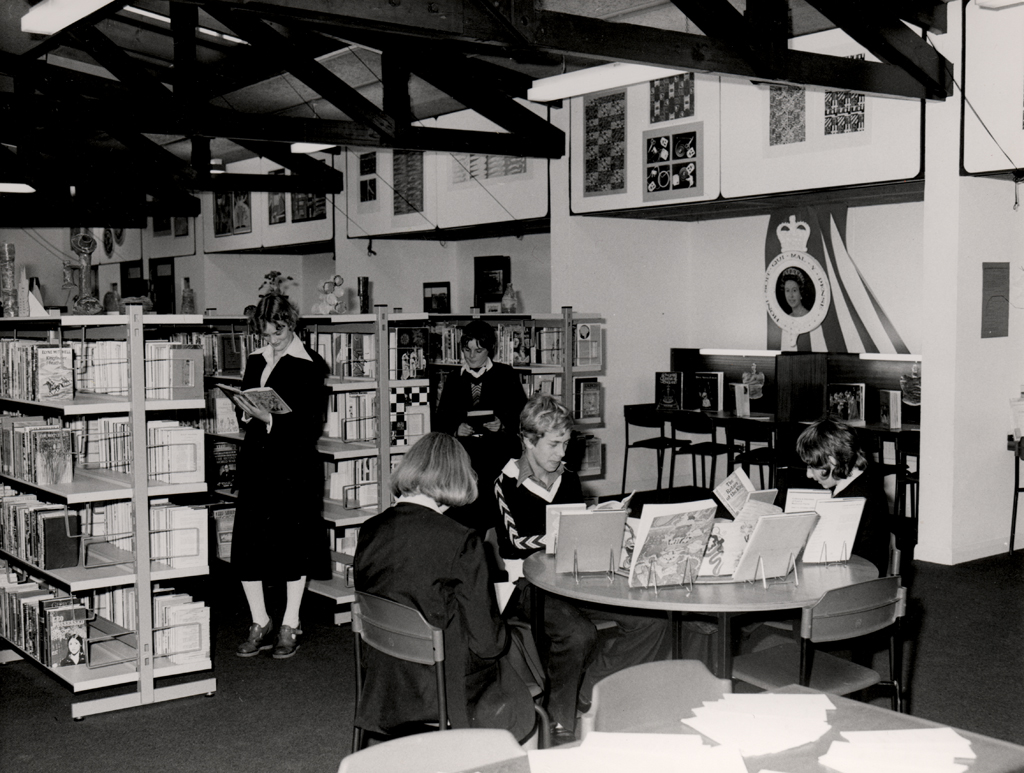
Blakelaw Comprehensive's library in 1977

In 1989 Blakelaw Comprehensive's Hugh White building was built. The building cost £680,000 and was encased in cladding produced by Eternit RAC. By 1998 all of Blakelaw's buildings had dilapidated.

In the summer of 1998, headteacher appointee Carol McAlpine was given £2.4 million from the Fresh Start programme to renovate the school's campus. £300,000 perimeter fences standing at 10 feet were erected and the school's interiors were given an overhaul. An additional new building was constructed, which included the installation of 130 new computers. Security was also installed.

The school's catchment area consisted of the deprived areas of Blakelaw and Cowgate.

== Partnerships ==
Firfield Community School benefitted from business partnerships with British Telecom and Marks & Spencer. Transco sponsored an initiative at the school where Year 11 and 12 students were paid every term for good behaviour and going to school and work experience. These payments reached up to £80.

== Headteachers ==
- Jeffery Curd (1988–1996)
- Russ Wallace (1997–1998)
- Carol McAlpine (1998–2000)
- Russ Wallace (2000–2002)

== See also ==
- Fresh Start programme
