= Dethridge =

Dethridge is a surname. Notable people with the surname include:

- George Dethridge (1863–1938), Australian judge
- Kate Dethridge (born 1962), British educator
- Rodney Dethridge (born 1961), British cricketer
