= Studio West =

Studio West may refer to:

- Studio West (school), a school in Newcastle upon Tyne in England
- Studio West (film studio), a film and television studio in West Auckland, New Zealand
