= Robert Newbolt =

English cricketer and British Army officer

Personal information
- Full name: Robert Henry Newbolt
- Born: 29 April 1833; Brentwood, Essex, England
- Died: 10 April 1885 (aged 51); Dresden, Saxony, Germany
- Batting: Unknown

Career statistics
Competition	First-class
Matches	1
Runs scored	10
Batting average	10.00
100s/50s	0/0
Top score	10
Balls bowled	–
Wickets	–
Bowling average	–
5 wickets in innings	–
10 wickets in match	–
Best bowling	–
Catches/stumpings	–/–
- Source: Cricinfo, 29 September 2018

Robert Henry Newbolt (29 April 1833 – 10 August 1885) was an English first-class cricketer and British Army officer.

Newbolt graduated as an officer cadet in June 1851, joining the Royal Artillery as a second lieutenant, with promotion to first lieutenant in November 1853. Promotion to Second Captain followed in June 1858. He played in a first-class cricket match in 1865, when he represented the Gentlemen of England against the Gentlemen of Middlesex at Islington. He gained the rank of captain in May 1866. In July 1872, he was promoted to the rank of major. He gained the rank of lieutenant colonel in May 1877. He died in Dresden, Germany in August 1885.
