= Kate Dethridge =

British educator

Dame Kathleen Dethridge, DBE (née Caldon; born 1962), known as Kate Dethridge, is a British educator who has been the Regional Director for South East since September 2022. Regional directors are part of the Department for Education, and work locally across children’s social care, SEND, schools and area-based programmes on behalf of the Secretary of State for Education.

Dethridge was born in Barking, Essex, to Frederick and Patricia Caldon. After attending Brentwood Ursuline Convent, she studied at Durham University, graduating with a Bachelor of Arts degree in Geography. She subsequently received a postgraduate certificate in education from the University.

Dethridge became a teacher in 1985 and married Rod Dethridge the following year. In 1988, she became a deputy head teacher and in 1998 became head teacher of Churchend Primary School in Reading. She was an Ofsted Inspector from 2000 and sat on several of its reform groups since 2011. She was a school improvement adviser between 2005 and 2010, a national leader of education from 2008, and an associate director of the National Education Trust from 2011. She was also a founding trustee of Claim your College to create a College of Teaching.

In 2015, Dethridge published 'A Practical Guide to the Early Years Foundation Stage and was appointed a Dame Commander of the Order of the British Empire (DBE). She also became Regional Schools Commissioner for North West London and South Central England. In September 2022 she became Regional Director for South East.

In October 2026 it was announced that Dethridge would leave her role as Regional Director to return to schools.
