= Goodgame =

Goodgame is a surname. Notable people with the surname include:

- Matthew Goodgame (born c. 1980), British actor
- Randall Goodgame (born 1974), American singer-songwriter
- Rebecca Goodgame Ebinger (born 1975), American judge
- Tony Goodgame (1946–2022), English footballer

== See also ==
- Capt. Goodgame House
- Goodgame Studios
