= Fresh Start programme =

Educational initiative in England, Wales and Northern Ireland

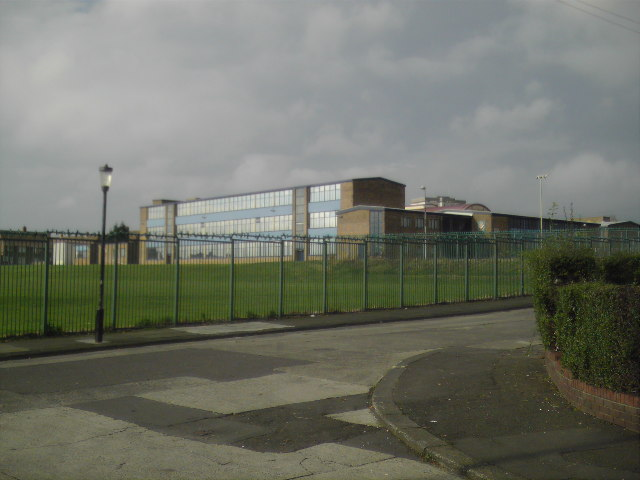
Blakelaw Comprehensive was the first school in the programme, reopening with a new headteacher as Firfield Community School in 1998

The Fresh Start programme, also known as the Fresh Start scheme, is an educational initiative in England, Wales and Northern Ireland introduced by the first Blair government in 1998. The programme aims to improve underperforming schools in inner cities by reopening them with renovated buildings and new names, curricula, staff and leadership (a "fresh start"). These schools, known as Fresh Start schools, benefit from an additional £400,000 every two years and have further financial support from their local education authorities.

== Description ==
The Fresh Start programme was first proposed in the Labour manifesto for the 1997 general election. Schools deemed to be failing would be given a "fresh start", reopening with new names and leadership. Some would also fall under the control of successful schools located nearby. This was expanded by the newly elected Labour government's 1997 education white paper Excellence in Schools. The white paper cited the successful "fresh start" of Phoenix High School (previously Hammersmith School), which was failing until the appointment of William Atkinson as headteacher in 1995. Atkinson and the school's local education authority renovated the school's site and introduced a new uniform, name and administration. The first three Fresh Start schools reopened in September 1998; this number raised to ten by May 2000.

As an alternative to a "fresh start", the programme has enabled education secretaries and local authorities, via the School Standards and Framework Act 1998, to close failing schools (their students moving to good schools close by) or merge them with another school. Some Fresh Start schools have been established from mergers. Another alternative is a "collaborative restart", where a failing school reopens with strong links to another school nearby.

Under the New Labour governments over 51 Fresh Start schools were created, of which 23 schools were primary, 27 secondary and one special. More have been created since then, such as Corelli College, which was given a fresh start as The Halley Academy in 2018. To qualify for a fresh start, a school originally needed below 15% of its students to pass five GCSE exams for three years in a row. This was raised to 30% by 2006. Typically, the school must also be in special measures or require improvement. Fresh Start schools are expected to improve within a year of reopening and are rigorously scrutinised by inspectors until they attain acceptable standards.

== Implementation ==
The first three Fresh Start schools reopened in September 1998, the first of which was Blakelaw Comprehensive which reopened as Firfield Community School. The government invested £1.5 million into the school and appointed new leadership. More schools received a fresh start the next year, including George Orwell School which reopened as Arts and Media School, Islington. The school's new headteacher Torsten Friedag earned an exceptional salary of £70,000 and was named Britain's first "super head". Super heads became a feature of the Fresh Start programme.

After the resignation of three Fresh Start super heads in March 2000, Education Secretary David Blunkett began contemplating changes to the programme. Scepticism around the programme began to grow after the third super head was found to have resigned because of a failed attempt to hide a critical letter from her school. The letter criticised the school's expulsion and truancy rates and bad behaviour and morale. Blunkett warned that "the alternative to Fresh Start is closure." At the same time, he announced the city academies programme. The programme would improve failing schools in inner cities and was originally seen as an extension of Fresh Start, being introduced as a "radical relaunch" of the programme. City academies were supported by Torsten Friedag, one of the Fresh Start super heads who resigned. City academies were later renamed as academies and became independent from Fresh Start.

In April and June 2000 two Fresh Start schools, including Firfield Community School, began failing. Firfield had experienced a deficit of £200,000 due to low student numbers and had suffered from a loss of reputation and morale after a Channel 4 documentary exposed failures within the school. Plans for Firfield's closure were announced by Newcastle City Council and a consultation process with parents began. The council also considered merging the school with another nearby. Over £2.5 million was invested into Firfield in what became an "embarrassment" for David Blunkett. It was later revealed that only two out of 16 Fresh Start schools had improved. The Conservative Party and its shadow education secretary Theresa May criticised the programme as failing. Blunkett admitted to dissatisfaction with some headteacher appointments in the programme and directed the Department for Education and Employment to take further control of the programme, introducing a two-year grant of £400,000 to its schools as a result.

By December 2000 the fourth super head had resigned and another Fresh Start school was set for closure. David Blunkett and his schools minister Estelle Morris began disfavouring the programme; Morris began pushing local authorities to close failing schools instead of giving them a fresh start and Blunkett began restricting the programme's extent. Fresh starts have thereafter been reserved for situations where "closure is not an option" and improvements are likely to be made.

== Other countries ==
=== United States ===
Fresh Start schools have been proposed in the United States by the Republican Party as part of its bid for school choice. Like British Fresh Start schools, these schools would replace failing schools and may fall under the control of a successful school nearby, benefiting from extra funds amounting to $2000 per pupil. Failing schools would have three years to improve before possibly being given a forced fresh start or may alternatively volunteer for a fresh start. The policy has already been implemented in parts of Minnesota, Tennessee and Illinois and has been put forward for approval in Arizona as part of a bill that focuses on school improvement.

The National Association of Charter School Authorizers have adopted the policy under the name Start Fresh, in response to the growing movement for school improvement that was enabled by the No Child Left Behind Act.

=== South Africa ===
The Fresh Start Schools Programme (FSSP) was launched by the National Education Collaboration Trust in 2015. Schools participating in the programme were given extra equipment and had their sites renovated. The programme was delivered through the Trust's District Intervention Programme, which aims to boost curricular provision and coordination between schools and their districts and local communities. 409 schools are part of the programme.

== See also ==
- Academy (English school)
- Education in England
- Education in Wales
