= Kenneth Smith (cricketer) =

English cricketer

Personal information
- Full name: Kenneth Desmond Smith
- Born: 30 April 1922; Bishop Auckland, County Durham, England
- Died: 31 May 1998 (aged 76); Selly Oak, Warwickshire, England
- Batting: Right-handed
- Bowling: Right-arm fast-medium
- Relatives: Paul Smith (son)

Domestic team information
- Years: Team
- 1949: Northumberland
- 1950–1951: Leicestershire
- 1953–1961: Northumberland

Career statistics
Competition	First-class
Matches	26
Runs scored	621
Batting average	17.25
100s/50s	–/2
Top score	70*
Balls bowled	192
Wickets	3
Bowling average	34.33
5 wickets in innings	–
10 wickets in match	–
Best bowling	2/37
Catches/stumpings	12/–
- Source: Cricinfo, 19 June 2022

Kenneth Desmond Smith (30 April 1922, Bishop Auckland, Durham; – 31 May 1998, Selly Oak, Birmingham) was an English cricketer.

Kenneth Smith was a right-handed batsman who played regularly for Leicestershire County Cricket Club between 1951 and 1952. He made an unbeaten 70 at Northampton in 1950. He scored 621 runs in 26 first-class matches at an average of 17.25 with two fifties and taking 12 catches.

He had three sons, Anthony, David and Paul, with latter both representing Warwickshire.
