= Steven Lines =

English cricketer (born 1963)

Personal information
- Full name: Steven John Lines
- Born: 16 March 1963 (age 63); Luton, Bedfordshire
- Batting: Right-handed
- Bowling: Right-arm medium

Domestic team information
- Years: Team
- 1980–1990: Bedfordshire
- 1983: Northamptonshire

Career statistics
Competition	First-class	List A
Matches	1	2
Runs scored	29	3
Batting average	29.00	1.50
100s/50s	0/0	0/0
Top score	29	2
Balls bowled	–	66
Wickets	–	4
Bowling average	–	10.25
5 wickets in innings	–	0
10 wickets in match	–	0
Best bowling	–	3/28
Catches/stumpings	1/–	2/–
- Source: Cricinfo, 2 August 2011

Steven John Lines (born 16 March 1963) is a former English cricketer. Lines was a right-handed batsman who bowled right-arm medium pace. He was born in Luton, Bedfordshire.

Lines made his debut for Bedfordshire against Buckinghamshire in the 1980 Minor Counties Championship. He played Minor counties cricket for Bedfordshire from 1980 to 1990, making 51 Minor Counties Championship appearances and 6 MCCA Knockout Trophy appearances. He made his List A debut against Somerset in the 1982 NatWest Trophy. He was dismissed for a single run by Hallam Moseley in Bedfordshire's innings, while with the ball he took the wickets of Peter Roebuck, Ian Botham and Nigel Popplewell for the cost of 28 runs from 10 overs. He made a further List A appearance against Gloucestershire in the 1985 NatWest Trophy. In this match, he took the wicket of Kevin Curran for the cost of 13 runs from a single over, while with the bat he was dismissed for 2 runs by David Graveney.

Lines also made a single first-class appearance, which came for Northamptonshire against Oxford University in 1983. He batted once in this match, scoring 29 runs in Northamptonshire's first-innings before being dismissed by Jonathan Turnbull.
