= Phoenix Academy, Shepherd's Bush =

Phoenix Academy
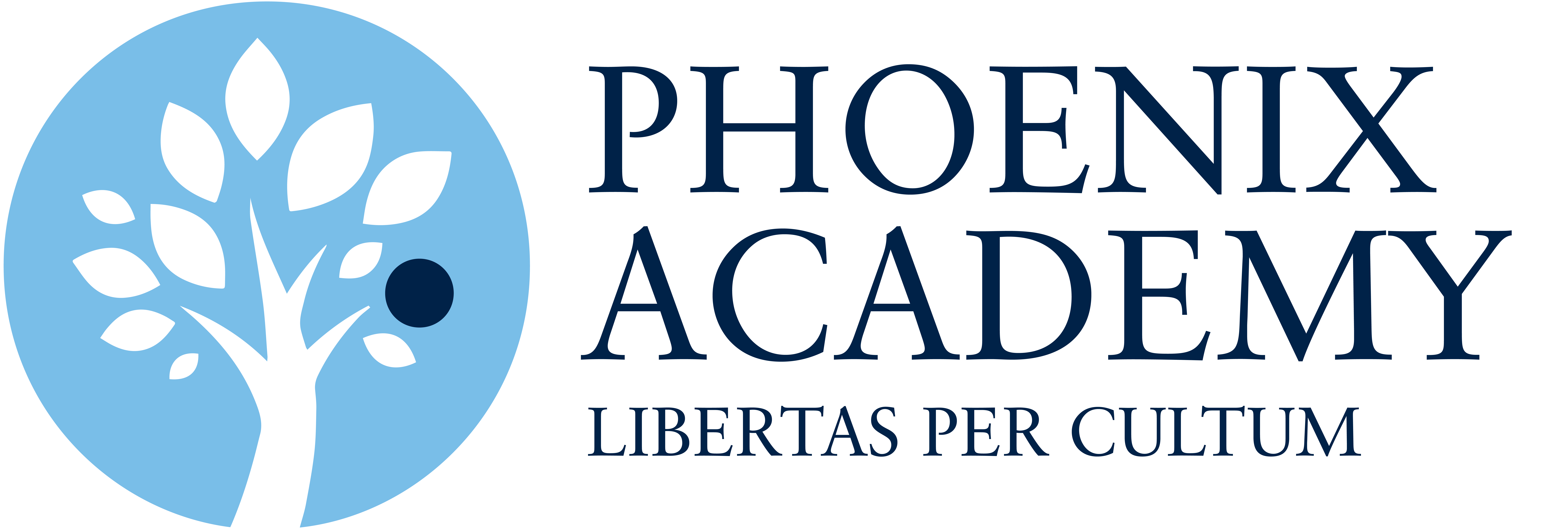

Location
- The Curve; Shepherd's Bush; London, W12 0RQ; England; 51.5127°N 0.2379°W

Information
- Type: Academy
- Established: 1995
- Local authority: Hammersmith and Fulham
- Trust: Future Academies
- Department for Education URN: 143129 Tables
- Ofsted: Reports
- Principal: Tony Macdowall
- Gender: Coeducational
- Age: 11 to 19
- Enrolment: 442
- Website: www.phoenix.futureacademies.org

Phoenix Academy is a coeducational secondary school and sixth form located in White City area of Shepherd's Bush, London, England.

== History ==
Prior to 1982 there were two schools on the current site of Phoenix High School: Christopher Wren Boys' School and Hammersmith County Girls' School.

In 1982, these two single-sex schools were merged into one co-educational comprehensive school on a single campus. This school was named Hammersmith School, with the two major wings named Wren Wing and County Wing to denote the previous school buildings. At the time of merging, the combined pupil population was 2,200.

By the early 1990s, both the pupil population and educational standards at Hammersmith School had fallen and it was judged by OFSTED to be a failing school. A relaunching and rebranding of the school to The Hammersmith School failed to improve standards, and in November 1991 a major fire started by pupils in Wren Wing building caused extensive damage.

In 1994 the school had been placed in special measures and was listed as one of the eight most challenging schools in England and the school population had fallen to 500 pupils. 'Superhead' William Atkinson was appointed as headteacher to attempt to turn around the school's fortunes, and it was relaunched as Phoenix High School.

In 2003 it had 759 students, of whom 429 were boys.

In 2007 it was reported by The Guardian to be the "most improved school" in the United Kingdom, judged by "league tables" of results. Headmaster Atkinson was knighted in the 2008 Queen's Birthday Honours for "services to education and community relations".

Following Sir William's departure, the school once again declined into special measures, in May 2016. Following this, Michael Taylor took over the leadership of the school. the school became an academy in September 2016 and was renamed Phoenix Academy. Michael Taylor left at the end of the 2017 academic year, making way for a new leadership team for 2017/18.

== Description ==
This is a small academy that is managed by Future Academies Trust, who strongly believe in a knowledge centred curriculum, and one that is focused on the classics normally only taught in private schools. As such all Key Stage 3 pupils are taught Latin, though this is not offered in Key Stage 4. In the sixth form students can study Ancient History and Latin.

The cohort of student contains a higher than average number from disadvantaged backgrounds and a higher than average number who speak English as a second language, while the number of students with Special Education Needs is broadly the same as in other English schools.

== Notable former pupils ==
- Wes Foderingham (b. 1991), professional footballer
- Chris Moore (footballer, born 1980)

=== Christopher Wren Boys' School ===
- Vigen Boyadjian (b. 1949), founder of the information technology company Viglen
- Jeff Chandler (b. 1959), professional footballer
- Paul Cook (b. 1956), punk music drummer
- Les Ferdinand (b.1966-), former professional footballer, director at Queens Park Rangers, F.C.
- Tony Goodgame (1946-2022), professional footballer
- Steve Jones (b.1955–), punk music guitarist
- Jeffery Kissoon (b. 1947), actor
- George Lawrence (b. 1962) former professional footballer
- Wally Nightingale (1956–1996), founder of the band that went on to become The Sex Pistols
- Steve Parsons (b 1957), former professional footballer
- Don Shanks (b 1952), professional footballer
- Alex Stewart (1964–2016), professional boxer
- Very Rev Victor Stock (b. 1944), clergyman
- Stray, pop music band
- Mike Trim (b. 1945), artist
- John Weider (b. 1947), pop musician
- Kevin McGrath DL OBE (b.1963) High Sheriff of Greater London 2014/15
- Dennis Wise (b. 1966), professional footballer

=== Hammersmith County Girls' School ===
- Mo Abudu (b. 1964), television presenter
- Sheyla Bonnick, singer
- Heather Small (b. 1965) singer

=== Hammersmith School (co-educational) ===
- Betty Boo (b. 1970) singer
