= David Smith (Warwickshire cricketer, born 1956) =

English cricketer and administrator

Personal information
- Full name: Kenneth David Smith
- Born: 9 July 1956 (age 70); Newcastle, Northumberland, England
- Batting: Right-handed
- Bowling: Unknown
- Relatives: Kenneth Smith (father); Paul Smith (brother); Alan Oakman (father-in-law)

Domestic team information
- Years: Team
- 1973–1985: Warwickshire

Career statistics
| Competition | First-class | List A |
|---|---|---|
| Matches | 197 | 108 |
| Runs scored | 8,734 | 2,772 |
| Batting average | 27.55 | 28.87 |
| 100s/50s | 9/55 | 2/19 |
| Top score | 140 | 113 |
| Balls bowled | 12 | 0 |
| Wickets | 0 | – |
| Bowling average | – | – |
| 5 wickets in innings | – | – |
| 10 wickets in match | – | – |
| Best bowling | – | – |
| Catches/stumpings | 34/– | 18/– |
- Source: Cricinfo, 19 June 2022

Kenneth David Smith (born 9 July 1956) is an English cricket administrator and former first-class cricketer.

David Smith was born in Newcastle upon Tyne, Northumberland. He represented Warwickshire County Cricket Club as a right-handed batsman in 197 first-class matches (1973–1985) passing 1,000 runs four times and 108 ListA matches (1975–1984). He frequently opened the innings with Dennis Amiss during his career. His best season was in 1980, when he scored 1,582 runs at an average of 36.79 with two hundreds and 12 fifties. As his first-class career declined, he became successful in the limited-over format. He played in one Youth Test in 1974 versus the West Indies scoring 41.

Upon retiring, he led a successful business career and served on the Warwickshire Committee for nine years. He later spent two years with Leicestershire as chief executive (2008–2010) and three years in a similar role with Northamptonshire (2011–2014).

== Family ==
His father Kenneth played regularly for Leicestershire in 1950–1951, his former father-in-law Alan Oakman represented Sussex (1947–1968) and England in 1956, while his younger brother Paul also played for Warwickshire (1982–1996)
