= Kenton School =

School in Newcastle upon Tyne, England

Kenton Academy (Newcastle)
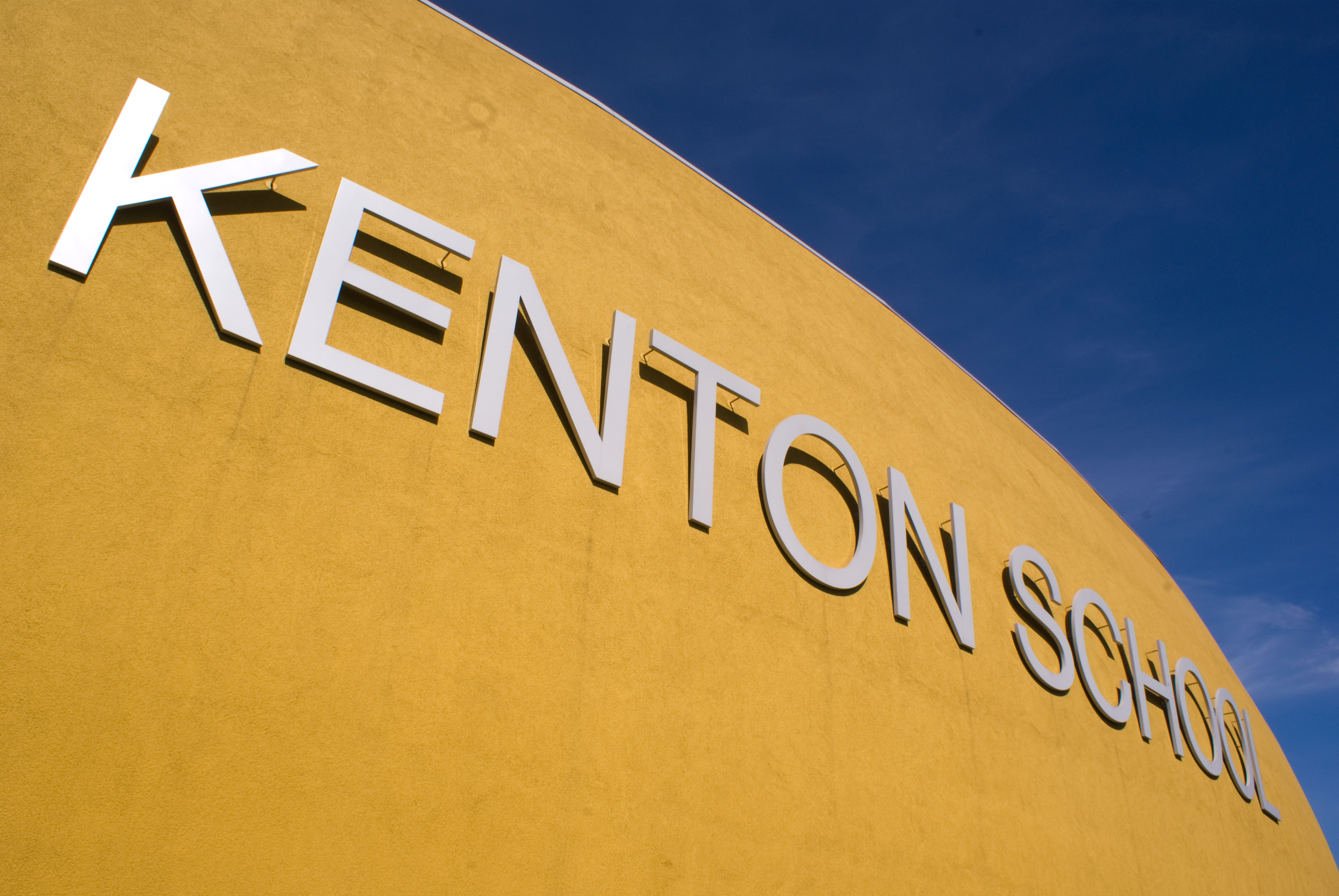

Location
- Kenton Lane and Drayton Road; Newcastle upon Tyne; England; 55.0029°N 1.65742°W

Information
- Type: Academy, Sixth form
- Motto: All Different, All Equal
- Department for Education URN: 138120 Tables
- Ofsted: Reports
- Age: 11 to 18
- Enrolment: 1,797
- Website: ks.northernleaderstrust.org

Kenton School is an Academy located in Newcastle upon Tyne, in Tyne and Wear, England. It is near Kenton Lane in Kenton and provides education for students in Key Stage 3 – 5, specifically Years 7 – 11.

Kenton School is a specialist Arts and Technology School and has achieved a Gold Artsmark from the Arts Council of England and a Sportsmark.

The school's sixth form building is used by both sixth formers and students attending the main academy, as well as serving as a local community college known as Kenton College. In a 2012 Ofsted report, the school was rated as Good, a decline from its previous Outstanding status obtained in 2009. The school was later rated as requires improvement in 3 separate reports by Ofsted in 2016, 2019 and 2022.

== History ==
Construction on the original Kenton School began in 1958, and the school was opened by Lord Morrison of Lambeth, better known as Herbert Morrison, on Friday, March 17, 1961.

The development of the school progressed with the addition of new buildings. East Block was the first to be constructed, followed by West Block in 1961. The plans for these buildings were submitted in 1957 and approved in 1958.

In 1971, South Block was added to the school site, and it was connected to the main school through the construction of a corrugated green fibreglass-clad bridge. This bridge served as a link between South Block and West Block. Over time, the Green Bridge lost its original colour and was reclad in grey-painted corrugated metal. The bridge remained in place until the demolition of the buildings between 2008 and 2009. Additionally, the school had its own adjoining swimming pool.

In 1978, North Block was added to the rear of East Block, following the closure of the adjacent Roman Catholic school, and in 1999, a new College Building was added to the campus. The College Building was officially opened by the then School's Minister, Estelle Morris.

Following 47 years in the original school buildings, the school moved into a new state-of-the-art building in Autumn 2008 and had its official opening on Friday, 2 July 2010.

The new school was officially opened by the film director and former Kenton School pupil, Mike Figgis.

== Former headteachers ==
Kenton School as seen from the main entrance on Kenton Lane

- Eric Hackett (1960–1)
- Charles Jary (1965–1972)
- Doreen Inness (1972–1981)
- Barbara Payne (1981–1992)
- Fran Done (1992–1993) (acting)
- Mike Gibbons (1994–1997)
- Fran Done (1997–1998) (acting)
- David Pearmain (1998–2015)
- Sarah Holmes-Carne (2015–2022)
- Richard Devlin (2022) (acting)
- Bill Jordon (2022) (acting)
- Jason Holt (2023)
- Moira Green (2023) (acting)
- Sinead Green (2023–present)
- Nichola Roberts (2024) (acting)

David Pearmain stepped down as headteacher in August 2015 and became the chief executive of Kenton Schools Academy Trust, under which Kenton School and Studio West operate. In 2017, Pearmain stepped down as chief executive, and was replaced by Kevin McDermid. In 2022, Ian Kershaw was appointed chief executive of the Trust, which rebranded as Northern Leaders Trust in May of that year. Lee Kirtley succeeded Kershaw as chief executive of the Trust in January 2023.

Kenton School's current principal is Sinead Green.

== Academy conversion ==
In 2011, the school undertook consultation to investigate conversion to Academy status. This was met with criticism by the NAS/UWT, the NUT, and the ATL, representatives of whom took strike action in September of that year. On 1 May 2012 Kenton School officially converted to an Academy. Throughout the process it was decided that the school's name would not change although for legal reasons Kenton School (Newcastle) is its registered name.

== Studio school ==
In September 2014, Kenton Academy opened a new studio school, Studio West, in the West Denton area of Newcastle upon Tyne. Studio West is based on the All Saints College site, after All Saints College closed in the summer of 2014.

== Notable alumni ==
- Chi Onwurah – Labour MP for Newcastle Central
- Paul Dummett – Former Newcastle United footballer
- Mike Figgis – Film director
- Muzoon Almellehan – Syrian activist
- Jamie Mole – Former Heart of Midlothian footballer
- Michael Richardson – Former Accrington Stanley footballer
- Danielle George – Engineer, astrophysicist and president of the Institution of Engineering & Technology
- Lauren Pattison – Comedian
- Ami Campbell – Former Manchester Originals cricketer
