= Kevin McGrath =

British businessperson (born 1963)

Kevin David McGrath OBE DL (born March 1963) is a British businessman, philanthropist. and executive producer of films and theatre productions including the Oscar- and BAFTA-winning short film An Irish Goodbye and the 2025 West End production of Othello, starring David Harwood and Toby Jones.

== Early career ==
McGrath graduated from the Polytechnic of the South Bank (renamed London South Bank University in 1989) with a BSc (Distinction) in Estate Management. He obtained a post-graduation RICS Diploma in Property Investment (Award Winner) from The College of Estate Management Reading. McGrath was elected a member of the Royal Intuition of Chartered Surveyors in 1990 and became a Chartered Surveyor. He has worked in the property industry for 40+ years and is a member of the Royal Institution of Chartered Surveyors., the Worshipful Company of Chartered Surveyors and is a Freeman of the City of London.

McGrath is Principal of The McGrath Family Office; Founder and Executive Chairman of M&M Portfolio Ltd and Former Non-Executive Chairman of Regional REIT Plc, and was previously managing director and Senior Adviser of F&C REIT Asset Management, which rebranded as BMO Real Estate Partners in July 2016. Kevin became a None Executive Director of Chris Harper Productions Ltd in September 2025.

Prior to F&C REIT, McGrath was a founding equity Partner in REIT Asset Management, a property investment finance and asset management partnership, which managed a global commercial property portfolio. Previous to REIT Asset Management, Kevin was a Senior Investment Surveyor with Hermes Investment Management, the Fund Manager for the British Telecommunication and Post Office Pension Schemes. Before that he worked for various local authorities in a variety of property related positions. And prior to that he worked in manufacturing and banking.

== Politics ==
McGrath was a candidate for the European Parliament 2009 Election; a candidate for the North East Hampshire Parliamentary constituency at the 2005 General Election; a candidate for Ealing Council in the 2006 London Council Elections and for the London Assembly in the 2012 London Elections.

== Other ==
Appointed as an Officer of the Most Excellent Order of the British Empire in the Queen's 2016 Birthday Honours List for Services to Charities

McGrath was The High Sheriff of the County of Greater London 2014/15

He is the Representative Deputy Lieutenant for the London Borough of Hammersmith and Fulham. 2015 - Current

McGrath was awarded an Honorary Degree of Doctor of the University from the University of Surrey in 2017 in recognition of an outstanding contribution to the arts.

McGrath was awarded an Honorary Degree of Doctor of Letters from the London South Bank University in 2022 in recognition of an outstanding contribution to business and charity.

He is Executive Producer of a number of short and full length feature films including An Irish Goodbye Winner of an Oscar for Best Live Action Short Film at the 95th Academy Awards and Winner of the Best British Short Film at the 76th BAFTA Awards.

McGrath is also Executive Producer of a number of theatre productions including Othello starring David Harewood and Toby Jones which opened in the West End in November 2025.

McGrath is Founder and Chair of the McGrath Charitable Trust, 2000 - current

McGrath is Deputy Chairman and co-founder of The Clink Prison Restaurant Charity, the first and only public restaurant to be built inside working British prisons 2010 - current

McGrath was appointed a Trustee of the Moorfields Eye Charity in 2022.

Chair of The Lyric Theatre Hammersmith 2005 - 2015

Trustee of The Old Vic Theatre, 2012-2021

He is Non-Executive Property Advisory Board Member of The Reserve Forces and Cadets Association for Greater London

McGrath was a former Director and Chairman of Queens Park Rangers Football Club plc; Plays Off 2003 and Promotion 2004

McGrath is Vice Chair of the QPR Sport in the Community Trust. and is Chair of QPR Women's Football Club.

He was Proprietor of Tribune Magazine;

Chair of Arts Education Schools, 2018 - 2021

McGrath served as a Commissioner on the Independent Commission on English Prisons Today under the leadership of Cherie Booth and sat on the Criminal Justice Policy Working Group under the Leadership of the Rt Hon Sadiq Kahn MP Shadow Justice Minister and the Independent Alcohol and Crime Commission Chaired by John Podmore and is a Commissioner on the independent Commission on Political Power convened by Baroness Frances D`Souza . He was a member of the Rt Hon Ed Balls Shadow Chancellors advisory team and the London Mayor Sadiq Khans pre-election Mayoralty Business Engagement Board.

He is a former Chair of the UNITED in Hammersmith and Fulham Charity, and Former Trustee and Chair of The Islamix Foundation;

McGrath is also an Ambassador for the Commonwealth Youth Enterprise Project and The Prison Advise and Care Trust (PACT); a London South Bank University Court Member; Honorary Vice President of the Commonwealth Youth Orchestra & Choir; and Patron of Clean Break Charity and of The Forgiveness Project.

Former Board Governor of the London South Bank University; and Trustee of The Chartered Surveyors Training Trust; The WAVE Trust; The Guildford School of Acting; The Howard League for Penal Reform; The National Education Trust; and The Prison Advice and Care Trust; and Council Member of The Victoria League for Commonwealth Friendship. He is a former member of Liberty Human Rights Policy Executive Board, UCLH Cancer Centre Development Board member and Ambassador for The Make Justice Work Charity. He was a school Governor for Canberra School; The Phoenix High School and The Eleanor Wilkinson School for Girls.

== Personal life ==
Born in West London and currently living in Ealing, Kevin is married to Kate and they have two children.
