= Cowgate, Newcastle upon Tyne =

Coordinates: 54.990°N 1.657°W

Cowgate
- Locality
- Location within the United Kingdom
- OS grid reference: NZ220662
- Ceremonial county: Tyne and Wear
- Country: England
- Sovereign state: United Kingdom

Cowgate is a locality in the north-west of Newcastle upon Tyne, England. It lies 2.8 miles Northwest of the City Centre. Initially it was in the Kenton ward up until 2018 which it was in the Blakelaw ward. The name is believed to come from the gate the local farmers would use from the Nuns Moor area to herd their livestock to the Newcastle cattle market.

The Cowgate estate was built in the 1920s.

In 2007 the Index of Multiple Deprivation identified the southern part of the estate as the most deprived area in the city and the 28th most deprived in England.

Carricks Bakery, which was later acquired by Greggs, was located in the area. The bakery was closed in 2005, and the work was transferred to other facilities in Newcastle.
