= Muzoon Almellehan =

Syrian activist and refugee resettled

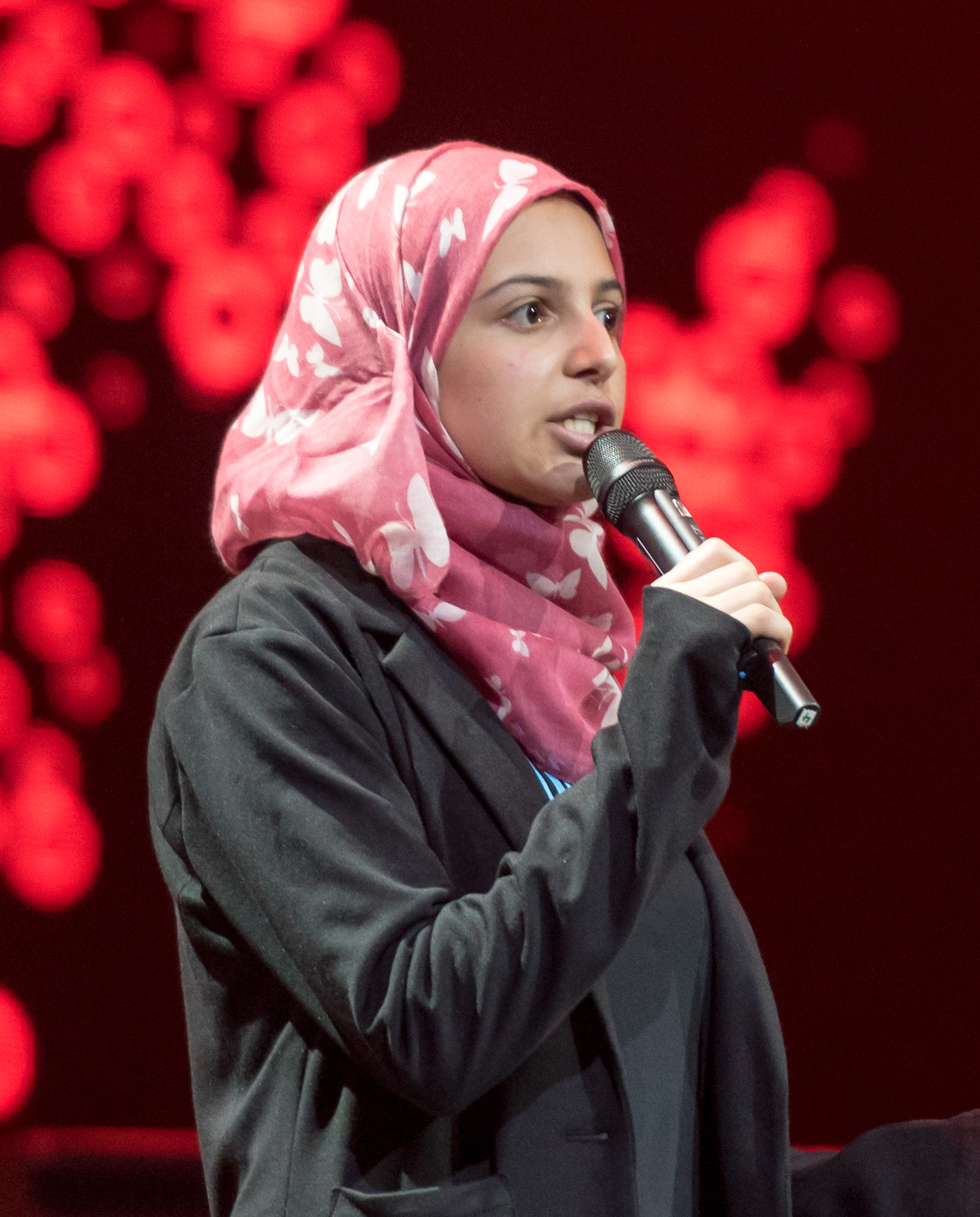
Muzoon Almellehan at the Global Citizen Festival in Hamburg (2017)

Muzoon Almellehan (Arabic: مزون المليحان; born 1999) is a Syrian activist and refugee resettled in the United Kingdom. She is known for her work to keep Syrian girls in school, and has been referred to as the "Malala of Syria". In June 2017, she became the youngest GoodWill Ambassador of UNICEF.

== Biography ==
Almellehan was born on April 16, 1999, to Eman and Rakan Almellehan, and brought up in the Syrian city of Daraa. Her father was a schoolteacher. She has two brothers and a sister, who are between one and four years younger than her. After the Syrian civil war broke out, their city was besieged by the government. In early 2013, her family moved to Jordan when the fighting became severe in 2014 and lived in refugee camps for three years. The Almellehan family was forced to move multiple times. When her family fled from Daraa for the first time to take refuge in the Jordan refugee camps, she claims that all she took with her were her books because education was the most important thing for her. The first camp they lived in was Za'atari, from where they moved to Azraq, another Jordanian camp. While there, her family received offers to move to Canada or Sweden. Almellehan's father rejected these for logistical reasons. Almellehan later negotiated her family's move to the United Kingdom under a plan announced in September 2015 by David Cameron, by which the British government planned to accept 20,000 Syrian refugees. The family was brought to Newcastle two and a half months later, being among the first Syrian refugees admitted to the UK. The Almellehan children were enrolled in a local school. Almellehan was among nine refugee children at Kenton School, and has expressed interest in becoming a journalist. She has stated that she found adjusting to the local variant of English difficult.

== Activism ==
Almellehan was led to advocate for girls' education by the fact that half of the 40 girls in her class at Za'atari dropped out of school to get married. Child marriage, although not particularly common in Syria, increased dramatically after the civil war began. Almellehan became known for trying to persuade parents to leave their children, particularly girls, in refugee schools rather than making them marry early. She also tried to persuade children to remain in school, and to prevent child marriage.

Almellehan is a friend of Malala Yousafzai, whom she met in 2014 when Yousafzai was visiting the refugee camp Almellehan was staying in. Yousafzai later invited Almellehan to the ceremony at which the former received the Nobel Peace Prize. Yousafzai also visited Almellehan upon the latter's arrival in the UK. Almellehan's activism received recognition in a number of countries, and has led to her receiving the sobriquet "Malala of Syria." In 2015, she was listed as one of BBC's 100 Women.

On October 16, 2017, Muzoon travelled back to Jordan for the first time after her migration to meet, support and help the students of the war stricken country, who were determined to gain education even during the toughest circumstances within the country.

Almellehan became the youngest GoodWill Ambassador of UNICEF in June 2017.

== See also ==
- Malala Yousafzai
