= 1986 English cricket season =

The 1986 English cricket season was the 87th in which the County Championship had been an official competition. Essex won the title for the third time in four seasons. England were defeated in both their Test series against New Zealand and India.

== Honours ==
- County Championship – Essex
- NatWest Trophy – Sussex
- Sunday League – Hampshire
- Benson & Hedges Cup – Middlesex
- Minor Counties Championship – Cumberland
- MCCA Knockout Trophy – Norfolk
- Second XI Championship – Lancashire II
- Wisden – John Childs, Graeme Hick, Dilip Vengsarkar, Courtney Walsh, James Whitaker

== Zimbabwe visit ==
The Zimbabwe national cricket team made a short visit to England and played a single limited overs match against Northamptonshire, the county winning by 7 wickets.

== Rest of the World team ==
The Rest of the World XI played a one-day versus a West Indies XI for the Sport Aid charity at Edgbaston Cricket Ground in Birmingham. The match was a no result due to rain.

== Annual reviews ==
- Playfair Cricket Annual 1987
- Wisden Cricketers' Almanack 1987
