= Blakelaw =

Coordinates: 54.994°N 1.671°W

- Ward
- Blakelaw highlighted within Newcastle upon Tyne

- Location within Tyne and Wear
- OS grid reference: NZ211666
- Metropolitan borough: Newcastle upon Tyne
- Metropolitan county: Tyne and Wear
- Ceremonial county: Tyne and Wear
- Region: North East
- Country: England
- Sovereign state: United Kingdom
- Post town: Newcastle upon Tyne
- Postcode district: NE5
- Police: Northumbria
- Fire: Tyne and Wear
- Ambulance: North East
- UK Parliament: Newcastle upon Tyne Central
- Councillors: Dr Juna Sathian (Labour); Linda Hobson (Labour); Marion Williams (Independent)

Blakelaw is an electoral ward situated in the North of the city of Newcastle upon Tyne in North East England. The population of the ward is 11,186, which is 4.6% of the city's population. Car ownership in the area is 50.6%: this is lower than the city average of 54.7%, increasing to 11,507 at the 2011 Census. House prices in this area average at £114,000 (Feb 2007).

Blakelaw was developed in the early part of the 20th century in order to meet demand for more housing in the North East. During the Second World War a secret war centre was built in the old quarry and extended many levels below ground. This was the headquarters for No 13 Group, who played a vital part in the Battle of Britain. Five posts have been installed in Blakelaw Park as part of a 'listening trail' which tells the story of the life of the bunkers and people who worked in them.

In terms of the Demographics of Blakelaw, it is very similar to many other parts of Newcastle. For age groups, 26.3% were 17 years old and under, 59.2% of its population was between the ages of 18 and 64, and 14.5% were over 65. In terms of Ethnicity it was 87.2% White, 6.8% Asian, 3.4% Black and 1.5% mixed which is a similar ethnic make up to quite a few parts of Newcastle but significantly less diverse as parts of the West End.

== Education ==
The ward has one Nursery, Willow Avenue Community Nursery and three primary schools: Hilton Primary Academy on Hilton Avenue, Thomas Walling Primary Academy, and English Martyrs'. The now closed Firfield Community School (formerly Blakelaw Comprehensive School) was also located in the ward.

== Recreation and leisure ==
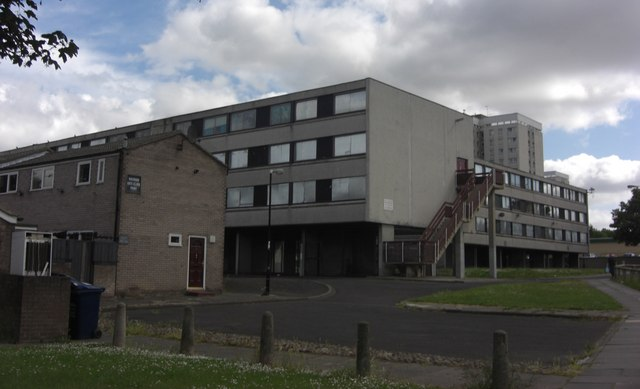
The Moulton Place flate were deck access flats, now demolished

The Blakelaw Centre houses a library, a community centre and a community cafe. The centre is operated by the Blakelaw Ward Community Partnership. Open green spaces in the ward are Blakelaw Park and the Cowgate sports ground.

== Boundary ==
The boundary of Blakelaw ward begins at the A1 junction with the Woolsington Bypass and Ponteland Road. It heads south-west along the A1 to the Stamfordham Road junction and south to Slatyford Lane bus depot. The boundary joins Silver Lonnen and continues down to Netherby Drive and Fenham Hall Drive. It heads north up Moorside Road North to Ponteland Road where it continues back to the starting point of the A1 junction.

== Political ==
Blakelaw is represented by three councillors: Councillor Marion Williams (Labour), Councillor Dr Juna Sathian (Labour), Councillor Linda Hobson (Labour). It is also part of Newcastle Central constituency and represented by Labour MP, Chi Onwurah.

There is also a community council for Blakelaw and North Fenham.

== Charts and tables ==
Age group	Number
Under 18	2,798
18-64	6,309
65+	1550

Ethnicity	Number	%
White	9,046	87.2%
Black	353	3.4%
Asian	702	6.8%
Arab	68	0.7%
Mixed	156	1.5%

The ward has 4,882 housing spaces of which 3.2% are vacant this is lower than the city average of 5.3%. Owner occupied property stands at 52% slightly lower than the city average of 53.3%. The properties are as follows.

Property type	Number	%
Detached	231	4.7
Semi-detached	2,470	50.7
Terraced	1,169	24
Flats	1,005	20.6
Other	0	0

== See also ==
- RAF Blakelaw
