= Christopher Lethbridge (cricketer) =

English cricketer (1961–2025)

Personal information
- Full name: Christopher Lethbridge
- Born: 23 June 1961; Castleford, Yorkshire, England
- Died: 31 January 2025 (aged 63)
- Batting: Right-handed
- Bowling: Right-arm medium

Domestic team information
- Years: Team
- 1986–1991: Cambridgeshire
- 1981–1985: Warwickshire

Career statistics
Competition	First-class	List A
Matches	50	58
Runs scored	1,033	272
Batting average	22.95	16.00
100s/50s	–/3	–/–
Top score	87*	57*
Balls bowled	4,995	2,529
Wickets	77	59
Bowling average	38.90	32.89
5 wickets in innings	1	1
10 wickets in match	–	–
Best bowling	5/68	5/47
Catches/stumpings	16/–	15/–
- Source: Cricinfo, 26 October 2011

Christopher Lethbridge (23 June 1961 – 31 January 2025) was an English cricketer. Lethbridge was a right-handed batsman who bowled right-arm medium pace. He was born at Castleford, Yorkshire.

Lethbridge made his first-class debut for Warwickshire against Yorkshire in the 1981 County Championship. He dismissed Geoffrey Boycott with his maiden first class delivery. He made 49 further first-class appearances for the county, the last of which came against Derbyshire in the 1985 County Championship. In his 50 first-class matches, he scored a total of 1,033 runs at an average of 22.95, with a high score of 87 not out. This score, which was one of three first-class fifties he made, came against Somerset in 1982. An all-rounder, with the ball he took 77 wickets at a bowling average of 38.90, with best figures of 5/68. These figures, which were his only first-class five wicket haul, came against Glamorgan in 1982.

He made his List A debut for Warwickshire in the 1981 John Player League against Worcestershire. He made 55 further List A appearances for the county, the last of which came against Derbyshire in the 1985 John Player Special League. In his 55 List A matches for Warwickshire, he scored 271 runs at an average of 18.06, with a high score of 57 not out. This score, which was his only one-day half century, came against Somerset in 1982. With the ball, he took 57 wickets at an average of 33.38, with best figures of 5/47. These figures represented his only five wicket haul in List A cricket and came against Northamptonshire in 1982. He left Warwickshire at the end of the 1985 season.

He joined Cambridgeshire for the 1986 season, making his debut for the county against Staffordshire in the Minor Counties Championship. He played Minor counties cricket for Cambridgeshire from 1986 to 1991, making 21 Minor Counties Championship and seven MCCA Knockout Trophy appearances. He also made two List A appearances for the county, one in the 1986 NatWest Trophy against Yorkshire and another against Derbyshire in the 1987 NatWest Trophy, taking two wickets.

Lethbridge died on 31 January 2025.
