= Kitty's Drift =

Early railway tunnel in Newcastle upon Tyne, UK

Coordinates: 54.98994°N 1.67755°W

Kitty's Drift is an early 3-mile (4.8 km) railway tunnel in the west of the English city of Newcastle upon Tyne. It was built around 1770 to transport coal underground from the East Kenton Colliery, at Kenton, to staithes on the Tyne at Scotswood. As built it was a single track waggonway with wooden rails and passing places for horsedrawn waggons.

The wagonway through the tunnel was abandoned in the first decade of the 19th century, with the colliery's output being transferred to the Kenton and Coxlodge Waggonway, which ran on the surface to the Tyne at Wallsend. However the tunnel continued in use as drainage for the colliery. In the 1930s the tunnel was again used to carry coal, in this case by the Montague Colliery from their Caroline Pit to the screens at their View Pit. In this case the wagons were cable-hauled, initially by steam power and latterly by electric power. The tunnel closed with the Montague Colliery in 1959, and its exact route is no longer known.
