= Ian Gemmell =

English cricketer (born 1953)

Personal information
- Full name: Ian James Gemmell
- Born: 6 April 1953 (age 73); Ashton-under-Lyne, Lancashire, England
- Batting: Right-handed
- Bowling: Right-arm fast-medium

Domestic team information
- Years: Team
- 1981–1982: Minor Counties
- 1979: Minor Counties North
- 1978–1983: Cheshire

Career statistics
Competition	List A
Matches	10
Runs scored	59
Batting average	7.37
100s/50s	–/–
Top score	20*
Balls bowled	455
Wickets	7
Bowling average	45.71
5 wickets in innings	–
10 wickets in match	–
Best bowling	2/58
Catches/stumpings	2/–
- Source: Cricinfo, 13 April 2011

Ian James Gemmell (born 6 April 1953) is a former English cricketer. Gemmell was a right-handed batsman who bowled right-arm fast-medium. He was born in Ashton-under-Lyne, Lancashire.

Gemmell made his debut for Cheshire in the 1978 Minor Counties Championship against the Somerset Second XI. Gemmell played Minor counties cricket for Cheshire from 1978 to 1983, including 48 Minor Counties Championship matches and two MCCA Knockout Trophy matches. In 1964, he made his List A debut for Minor Counties North in the 1979 Benson & Hedges Cup, playing two matches against Middlesex and Yorkshire. He later represented the Minor Counties cricket team in the 1981 and 1982 competitions, playing five matches for the team. His debut in List A cricket for Cheshire did not come until the 1981 NatWest Trophy when Cheshire played Hampshire. He played two further List A matches for Cheshire, in 1982 against Middlesex and in 1983 against Kent. In total he ten List A matches, scoring 59 runs at a batting average of 7.37, with a high score of 20*. With the ball he took 7 wickets at a bowling average of 45.71, with best figures of 2/58.
