= Studio West (school) =

Studio school in Newcastle upon Tyne, England

Location
- West Denton Way, West Denton; Newcastle upon Tyne, Tyne and Wear, NE5 2SZ; England, United Kingdom; 54.99429°N 1.69872°W

Information
- Type: Studio school
- Established: September 2014
- Department for Education URN: 140965 Tables
- Ofsted: Reports
- Principal: Julie Roberts
- Age: 11 to 19 (Sixth form)
- Website: www.studiowestnewcastle.com

Studio West, opened in September 2014, is a studio school situated in Newcastle upon Tyne in Tyne and Wear, England.

Studio West opened on the old All Saints College site in West Denton. Along with Kenton School, it is part of the Northern Leaders Trust. All Saints College opened in September 2002, and formed All Saints Church of England College Trust in 2010. It closed in the summer of 2014, just 12 years after opening. West Denton High School was originally based on the site.

== History ==
All Saints College was an 11 to 18 Church of England faith school with foundation status in West Denton, Newcastle upon Tyne, England. It was established in 2002 as a Fresh Start school, replacing West Denton High School and Firfield Community School, with it being located on the site of the former, and two middle schools. It was jointly founded and administered by the Diocese of Newcastle, Newcastle City Council and Newcastle University. In 2006 it became a specialist school in Business and Enterprise and in 2010 it became a trust school, forming the All Saints Church of England College Trust in May 2010. After a negative Ofsted inspection in 2014, Newcastle City Council closed the school and allowed the neighbouring Kenton School to establish a new studio school on its site. The new Studio West opened in September 2014.

== Principals ==
Julie Roberts is the Principal of Studio West.

All Saints College had 5 principals in its 12 years:

- James Colquhoun (2002–03)
- Russ Wallace (Acting) (2004)
- David Scott (2004-2009)
- Lesley Craig (2009-2013)
- Sue Huntley (Acting) (2014)

== Ofsted judgements ==
As of 2024, the school has received two Ofsted judgements one in 2017, where it was rated requires improvement and another where it was rated Good.
