= Lincoln Road Ground, Enfield =

Cricket ground in England

Coordinates: 51.64696°N 0.07619°W

Lincoln Road Ground
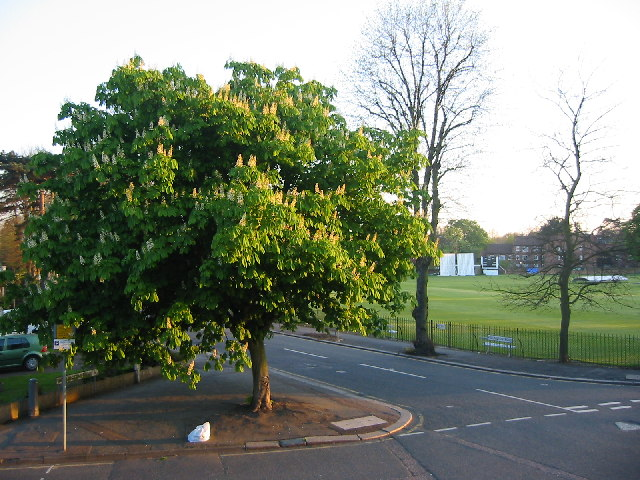

Ground information
- Location: Enfield, London
- Country: England
- Establishment: 1940 (first recorded match)

Team information
Middlesex	(1982)
- As of 2 September 2010; Source: Ground profile

Lincoln Road Ground is a cricket ground in Enfield, London, in the historic county of Middlesex. The first recorded match on the ground was in 1940, when Enfield played a British Empire XI.

Throughout its history, the ground has played host to a total of 39 Second XI fixtures for the Middlesex Second XI in the Minor Counties Championship, Second XI Championship and Second XI Trophy.

In 1982, the ground held its only List-A match when Middlesex played Cheshire in the 1982 NatWest Trophy.

In local domestic cricket, the ground is the home venue of Enfield Cricket Club.

Current Head Groundsman of the venue is Ayden King.
