= Tivoli Road =

Cricket ground in Hornsey, London, England

Coordinates: 51.58236°N 0.13121°W

Ground information
- Location: Hornsey, London
- Establishment: 1870

Team information
Middlesex	(1959)
- As of 2 September 2010; Source: Ground profile

Tivoli Road is a cricket ground in Hornsey, London (formerly Middlesex). First established in 1870, the first recorded match on the ground was in 1936, when the Middlesex Second XI played the Kent Second XI in the Minor Counties Championship. The ground has also held 14 Second XI Championship matches for the Middlesex Second XI between 1960 and 1981.

The only first-class match held on the ground came in 1959 when Middlesex played Hampshire in the County Championship.

The ground is today the home venue of Hornsey Cricket Club.
