= David Thomas (cricketer, born 1959) =

English cricketer

Personal information
- Full name: David James Thomas
- Born: 30 May 1959; Solihull, Warwickshire, England
- Died: 28 July 2012 (aged 53); Chalfont St Peter, Buckinghamshire, England
- Nickname: Teddy
- Batting: Left-handed
- Bowling: Left-arm medium-fast

Domestic team information
- Years: Team
- 1977–1987: Surrey
- 1980/81: Northern Transvaal
- 1983/84: Natal
- 1985: Marylebone Cricket Club
- 1988: Gloucestershire
- FC debut: 13 August 1977 Surrey v Lancashire
- Last FC: 1 June 1987 Gloucestershire v Oxford University
- LA debut: 14 August 1977 Surrey v Lancashire
- Last LA: 28 August 1988 Gloucestershire v Essex

Career statistics
Competition	First-class	List A
Matches	150	153
Runs scored	3,044	1,556
Batting average	20.02	18.74
100s/50s	2/8	0/6
Top score	119	72
Balls bowled	21,447	6,637
Wickets	336	142
Bowling average	33.97	33.71
5 wickets in innings	7	0
10 wickets in match	1	0
Best bowling	6/36	4/13
Catches/stumpings	50/–	24/–
- Source: CricketArchive, 1 August 2012

David James Thomas (30 June 1959 – 28 July 2012) was an English cricketer who played for Surrey.

David Thomas was a left-arm medium-fast swing bowler who represented the England Young Cricketers in 1978 and was tipped as a future Test cricketer. He was also a hard-hitting tail-end batsman good enough to score two centuries in first-class cricket.

He played his part in taking Surrey to four Lord's finals between 1979 and 1982. He was awarded the Man of the Match Award for his 3–26 versus Warwickshire in the 1982 NatWest Trophy final which helped Surrey to win the match, and was awarded his county cap during the same season. He claimed 57 first-class wickets in 1983 and 60 in 1984. In 1983 he also came close to 1,000 first-class runs, with 937 at an average of 36.03, scoring two centuries. The closest he came to Test selection was that season, being twelfth man for the Trent Bridge Test against New Zealand.

He spent two close seasons representing the South African teams Natal and Northern Transvaal in the Currie Cup. He remained popular with his team-mates but a short-lived move to Gloucestershire in 1988 was cut short when he was forced to retire through multiple sclerosis aged 29. He became an active fundraiser for the charity for the rest of his life. He died from complications arising from the disease in July 2012 aged 53. He left a widow Louise and four children.
