= Kenton, Newcastle upon Tyne =

Coordinates: 55.003°N 1.649°W

Kenton
- Ward
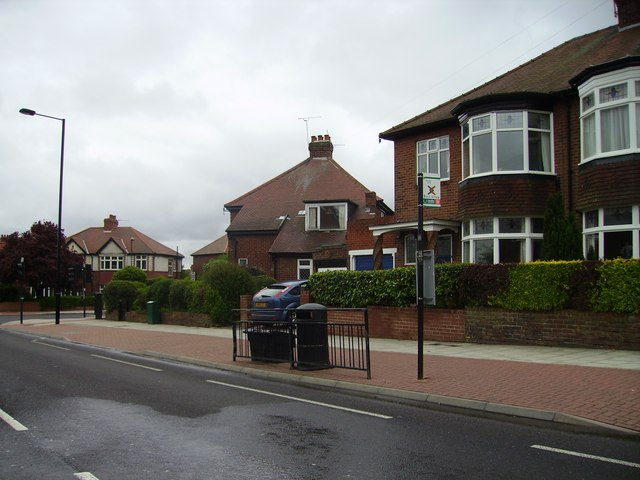
- Kenton Lane

- Kenton highlighted within Newcastle upon Tyne

- Location within Tyne and Wear
- OS grid reference: NZ225676
- Metropolitan borough: Newcastle upon Tyne
- Metropolitan county: Tyne and Wear
- Ceremonial county: Tyne and Wear
- Region: North East
- Country: England
- Sovereign state: United Kingdom
- Post town: Newcastle upon Tyne
- Postcode district: NE3
- Dialling code: 0191
- Police: Northumbria
- Fire: Tyne and Wear
- Ambulance: North East
- UK Parliament: Newcastle upon Tyne North

Kenton is a suburb and electoral ward in the north west of Newcastle upon Tyne, in the county of Tyne and Wear, England. It borders the Town Moor and Gosforth. Kenton also has close road links to Newcastle Airport. The ward population at the 2011 Census was 11,605.

The area borders Kingston Park, notable for the Kingston Park shopping centre, as well as Kenton School, one of the largest schools in the UK with approximately 2000 students.

The nearest Tyne and Wear Metro station is Fawdon, with stations at Kingston Park and Bank Foot the other side of the A1 Western bypass. Nearby places include Fawdon and Cowgate.

== Etymology ==
The name Kenton is of Old English origin. It is derived from the elements cyne ("kingly, royal") and tūn ("farm, estate, settlement").

== Residential ==
Kenton contains a wide range of residential areas and developments. These residential areas range from Council housing estates to modern middle class new-builds and privately owned residential estates. In North Kenton and Kenton Bar, the housing is predominantly council owned. Kenton Lane, which runs through the heart of Kenton, contains traditional 1930s housing on both sides of the road, with more affluent households lining the streets behind.

== Places of interest ==
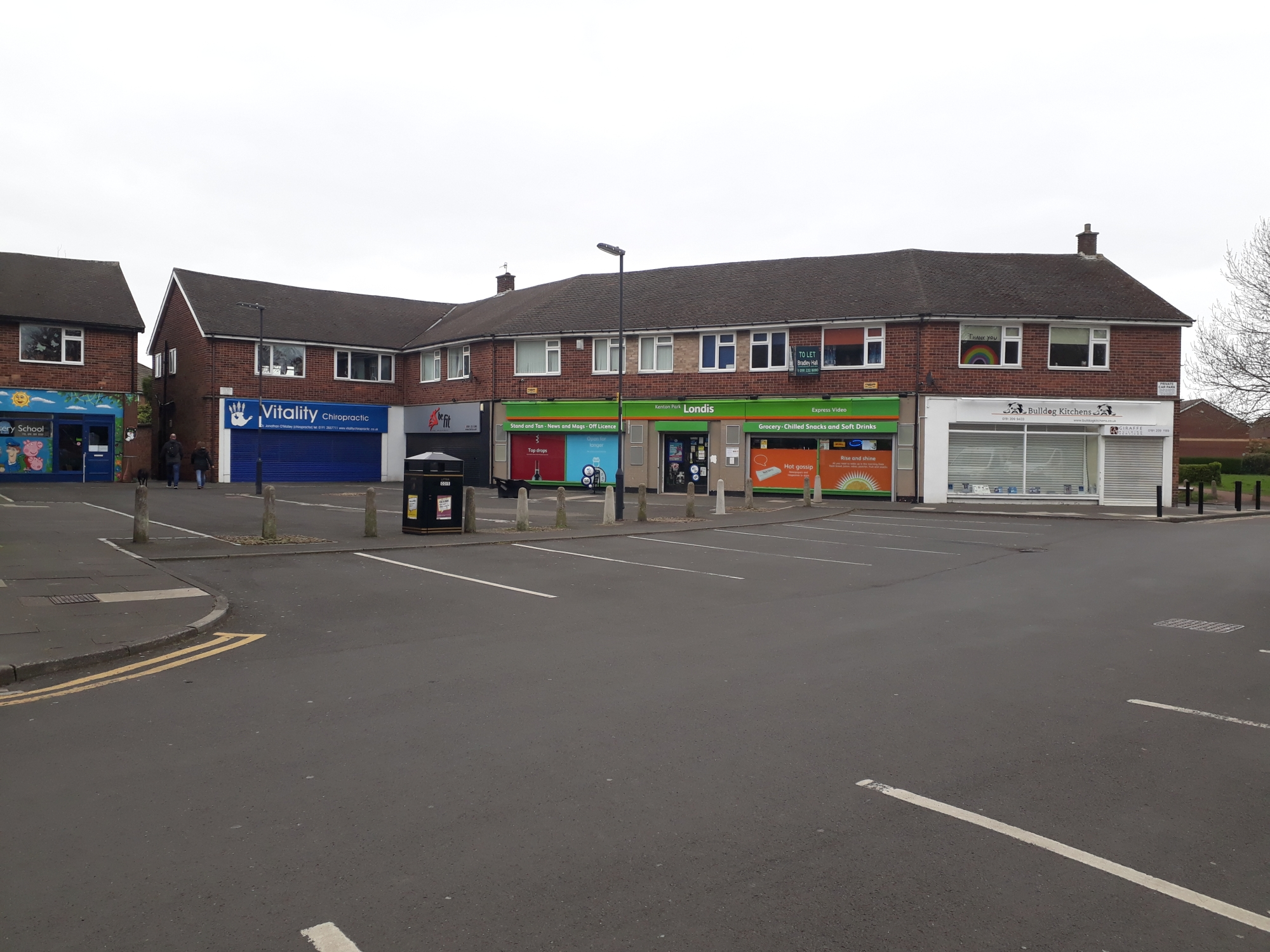
One of the numerous shopping areas in Kenton, the Kenton Park Shops

Kenton contains a wide range of amenities and services for the local community, although some of these amenities are considered to be in Kingston Park and/or bordering Gosforth.

Kenton borders Kingston Park, home to the flagship Tesco Extra store, and has a smaller Tesco Express on Kenton Lane.

North Kenton hosts a shoppings centre locally known as Kenton Retail. The Shopping Centre dates back to the 1950s as it was built with the grown demand of houses. The centre is part of an ongoing renovation project that started late 2014, where it has been transformed into a refreshed centre.

The shopping centre shares a car park with the Kenton Centre. The Kenton Centre is located on Hillsview Avenue also includes a GP surgery, library, housing office and a social services team.

Kenton Dene is a large green space between Kenton, Montague and Cowgate that exists to the side of Kenton Lane. It has been host to many local events and festivals and is a popular area for dog walkers and walkers alike. Kenton Riding School is situated next to Kenton Dene. The dene also leads onto part of the Newcastle Moor.

== History ==
Possibly the first Kenton streets, Shiney Row & Low Row, were built for Kenton Colliery which was situated in what is now Montagu Estate. The colliery was the supply point for Kitty's Drift, a 3-mile underground railway tunnel used for transporting coal to the Bells Close staiths on the Tyne near Scotswood.

Kenton was formerly a township in the parish of Gosforth, in 1866 Kenton became a separate civil parish, on 1 April 1935 the parish was abolished and merged with Newcastle upon Tyne. In 1931 the parish had a population of 417. In 1974 it became part of the metropolitan district of Newcastle upon Tyne.

== Local representation ==
Kenton is currently represented locally by three Labour City Councillors; Ged Bell, Stephen Lambert and Paula Maines Nationally, Kenton is incorporated into the Newcastle upon Tyne Central constituency which is represented by Chi Onwurah.

== Schools ==
Kenton has four primary schools, as follows.

- Mountfield Primary
- St Cuthbert's Roman Catholic Primary
- Wyndham Primary
- Kenton Bar Primary

Secondary education and Sixth Form is provided by Kenton School.
