= Paul Smith (cricketer, born 1964) =

English cricketer

Personal information
- Full name: Paul Andrew Smith
- Born: 15 April 1964 (age 62); Gosforth, Northumberland, England
- Batting: Right-handed
- Bowling: Right-arm fast-medium
- Relatives: Kenneth Smith (father)

Domestic team information
- Years: Team
- 1982–1996: Warwickshire
- 1997: Shropshire

Career statistics
Competition	First-class	List A
Matches	221	270
Runs scored	8,173	4,430
Batting average	26.44	22.83
100s/50s	4/48	–/15
Top score	140	93*
Balls bowled	15,931	8,047
Wickets	283	234
Bowling average	35.72	28.57
5 wickets in innings	7	3
10 wickets in match	–	–
Best bowling	6/91	5/36
Catches/stumpings	60/–	44/–
- Source: Cricinfo, 19 June 2022

Paul Andrew Smith (born 15 April 1964) in Gosforth, Northumberland is a former English cricketer who played for Warwickshire from 1982 to 1996. He represented England in the Hong Kong and Singapore Sixes.

He was educated at Heaton Grammar School, Newcastle upon Tyne.

== Cricket career ==
A mercurial allrounder, Smith was a big-hitting right-handed batsman, and a genuinely fast right-arm bowler. He made four first-class hundreds in his 221-game career, the first when he was just 19, and in 1986 he became the youngest Warwickshire player to score 1,500 runs in a season. He was a key player in the side which won an unprecedented Treble in 1994 (County Championship, Sunday League, and Benson & Hedges trophy), taking the Man of the Match award in the final of the Benson & Hedges trophy against Worcestershire. The following year, in 1995, he again played an important role as Warwickshire completed the double of County Championship and Natwest Trophy. In all, Smith played in six Lord's one-day finals during his career.

Along with opening partner Andy Moles, Smith holds a world record, after the pair shared eight consecutive opening partnerships of 50-plus. In first-class cricket, he scored a total of 8,173 runs at 26.44, with a best of 140. With the ball, he took 283 wickets at 35.72, which included two hat-tricks and a best of 6 for 91. Always a potent force in the one-day game, able to turn a match with bat or ball, he won three titles with Warwickshire in the 50-over game, and won all domestic trophies several times. His one-day career saw him amass combined totals 4,430 runs and 234 wickets.

Late in his career, Smith drew great pride from becoming the first white cricketer to play for Cape Town club St. Augustine’s during the dismantling of apartheid. This sprang directly from the recommendation of former Warwickshire coach Bob Woolmer, and carried a cultural significance as St. Augustine’s C.C. had famously once been the cricketing home of the legendary Basil D’Oliviera.

He retired in 1996, and soon afterwards was quoted in a Sunday tabloid as having admitted to drug use in the latter stages of his career. The ECB subsequently banned him for two years. Smith formed CWB (Cricket Without Boundaries) with Pertemps Group Chairman Tim Watts, with the aim of linking sport to the classroom and then employment. CWB saw a 40% participant return to work. Other projects he initiated included Coachright, who linked sport to academic accreditation. Over 150 schools and 20 community groups benefited from the initiative.

He struggled with life after cricket, and moved to the U.S.A. for a time, where he became involved with the Compton Cricket Club in Los Angeles, which seeks to use the spirit and disciplines of cricket to turn youngsters away from crime. This led to Smith being awarded a Certificate of Appreciation from Los Angeles City in 2003. He also works with the Prince's Trust in the U.K.

In 2007, Smith published a revealing autobiography entitled Wasted?, described by one reviewer as "far from a conventional read" and a work of "refreshing honesty".The book was nominated for the shortlist of the Sunday Times Newspaper Book of the Year Award.

== Media Work ==
- Wrote a weekly article for the Birmingham Post 1998 – 1999 – 2000. Has since written articles for a variety of magazines.
- Has a Hospitality room named after him at Edgbaston Cricket Ground.
- Global Ambassador for the Compton Cricket Club.

== Sources ==
- Wasted?, by Paul Smith, published by Know the score books (2007), ISBN 978-1-905449-45-3
