= Neil O'Brien (cricketer) =

English former cricketer

Personal information
- Full name: Neil Terence O'Brien
- Born: 9 March 1945 (age 81); Heaton Moor, Cheshire, England
- Nickname: Nob/Oby
- Batting: Right-handed
- Bowling: Right-arm medium

Domestic team information
- Years: Team
- 1979: Minor Counties North
- 1979–1989: Minor Counties
- 1977–1978: Minor Counties East
- 1970–1991: Cheshire

Career statistics
Competition	First-class	List A
Matches	2	34
Runs scored	27	378
Batting average	13.50	12.60
100s/50s	–/–	–/1
Top score	14	51*
Balls bowled	186	1,536
Wickets	1	22
Bowling average	101.00	37.90
5 wickets in innings	–	–
10 wickets in match	–	–
Best bowling	1/23	4/15
Catches/stumpings	1/–	11/–
- Source: Cricinfo, 11 August 2011

Neil Terence O'Brien (born 9 March 1945) is a former English cricketer. O'Brien was a right-handed batsman who bowled right-arm medium pace. He was born in Heaton Moor, Lancashire.

O'Brien made his debut for Cheshire in the 1970 Minor Counties Championship against the Yorkshire Second XI. Prior to playing for Cheshire O'Brien had represented Lancashire County Cricket Club at Colt and Second team level. He played Minor counties cricket for Cheshire from 1970 to 1991, making 194 Minor Counties Championship appearances and 23 MCCA Knockout Trophy appearances. He made his List A debut for Cheshire against Hampshire in the 1981 NatWest Trophy. He made a further 8 List A appearances for the county, the last of which came against Hampshire in the 1989 NatWest Trophy. In his 9 List A appearances for Cheshire, O'Brien scored 134 runs at an average of 14.88, with a high score of 28. With the ball, he took 2 wickets which came at an expensive bowling average of 139.00, with best figures of 1/16.

During his career he also played for an assortment of Minor counties teams. It was for Minor Counties East that he made his overall List A debut for, which came against Essex in the 1977 Benson & Hedges Cup. He went on to make 7 further List A appearances for Minor Counties East, scoring 72 runs at an average of 9.00, with a high score of 31, while with the ball he took 9 wickets at an average of 21.44, with best figures of 4/15. He made more List A appearances for Minor Counties cricket team than any other, making his debut for the team against Hampshire in the 1981 Benson & Hedges Cup. He made 12 further List A appearances for the team, the last of which came against Nottinghamshire in the 1989 Benson & Hedges Cup. In his 13 appearances for the team, he scored 156 runs at an average of 15.60, with a high score of 51 not out. This score, which was his only fifty in List A cricket, came against Surrey in the 1981 Benson & Hedges Cup. During his Benson and Hedges career O'Brien won two Man of the Match Gold Medals against Leicestershire and Surrey. With the ball, he took 10 wickets at an average of 24.30, with best figures of 3/19. He also played first-class cricket for the Minor Counties on two occasions. The first of these came against the touring Indians in 1979, with the second coming against the touring Sri Lankans in 1981.O'Brien also represented The Minor Counties against Australia, New Zealand and Pakistan. He also made four List A appearances for Minor Counties North, though with limited success.O'Brien also represented Cheshire at Table Tennis and has played golf off a single figure handicap for the last 50yrs.
