= Michael McEvoy =

Indian-born English cricketer

Personal information
- Full name: Michael Stephen Anthony McEvoy
- Born: 25 January 1956 (age 70); Jorhat, Assam, India
- Batting: Right-handed
- Bowling: Right-arm medium

Domestic team information
- Years: Team
- 1976–1981: Essex
- 1982: Cambridgeshire
- 1983–1984: Worcestershire
- 1985–1990: Suffolk

Career statistics
Competition	FC	LA
Matches	69	33
Runs scored	2,128	514
Batting average	19.17	22.34
100s/50s	1/10	0/3
Top score	103	61
Balls bowled	180	0
Wickets	3	0
Bowling average	34.33	–
5 wickets in innings	0	0
10 wickets in match	0	N/A
Best bowling	3/20	–
Catches/stumpings	70/0	0/0
- Source: CricketArchive, 18 November 2008

Michael Stephen Anthony McEvoy (born 25 January 1956) is an Indian-born former English first-class cricketer who played first-class and List A cricket between 1976 and 1990, with the bulk of his career being between 1980 and 1984.

He was playing for the Essex Second XI at the age of 17, but his debut in first-class cricket was in a County Championship match against Middlesex in August 1976; he scored 18 and 13, opening the batting in both innings. At the start of September, he scored his maiden first-class half-century, producing an innings of 61 against Somerset.

McEvoy remained a bit-part player in the Essex side for the rest of the 1970s, but this changed in 1980 when he played in 16 first-class and eight List A games. His final aggregate of 600 first-class runs was the most he scored in any season, albeit with only two fifties and an average of little more than 20. He again played a fair number of first-team games in 1981, and claimed his only three first-class wickets when he took 3/20 against Middlesex at Lord's, but he was confined to the Second XI after mid-July and left Essex at the end of the season.

Without a first-class county to play for in 1982, McEvoy turned out for Cambridgeshire in minor counties cricket, and made his maiden List A half-century in scoring 52 against Warwickshire in the NatWest Trophy. In 1983, he returned to senior cricket with Worcestershire, and near the end of the season hit his only first-class hundred when he struck 103 against Warwickshire. He averaged 22.76 in scoring 569 first-class runs that summer, his highest in any season, but in 1984 that figure collapsed to 14.46, and his total of 188 runs from 13 innings told its own story.

That was that as far as McEvoy's first-class career was concerned, but he then enjoyed several seasons with Suffolk, playing quite regularly from 1985 until 1990, and then occasionally until 1992. He scored four centuries in the space of six weeks in 1989, and appeared in Suffolk's losing Championship final against Cheshire in 1985, though he was dismissed for just 5. He played one List A game in the NatWest Trophy each year from 1985 to 1990.
