= National Education Trust =

The National Education Trust (NET) is an independent, not-for-profit charity devoted to "positive change in education". It is a small organisation based in Saunderton, Buckinghamshire, UK.

== History ==
The National Education Trust was founded in September 2006 by Roy Blatchford, who has held a number of posts in education including head of Walton High, HM Inspector of Schools and lecturer / commentator on all education issues.

The NET is chaired by Richard Howard, honorary fellow of Oxford Brookes University and former Chief Education Adviser in Oxfordshire. Its board of trustees include Hilary Hodgson, head of education at the Esmée Fairbairn Charitable Trust, and a trustee of the Sutton Trust; Sir David Winkley, fellow of Nuffield College, Oxford, and founder of the National Primary Trust; and Pat Jefferson, an educational consultant and former senior advisor at the Department for Education. Former trustees include Mike Baker, who worked as BBC education correspondent and was an honorary fellow of the College of Teachers. The annual NET lecture is dedicated to his memory.

== Activities ==
The National Education Trust organizes a range of activities based around three main aims: to provide a national resource for sharing best practice; to provide high quality school improvement and continuing professional development training; and to contribute to national policy discussions. To promote the sharing of best practice, NET has built a network of advocacy schools that demonstrate aspirational nature and form a body of knowledge that other schools can benefit from. The trust holds ‘Invitation Seminars’, where leaders from other schools can visit advocacy schools and gain knowledge of best practice.

Another important project has been that run in conjunction with the Inner Temple, aiming at raising the awareness of children to the opportunities inherent in a legal career.

NET is a provider of Continuing Professional Development (CPD) training for school leaders and staff at all levels of education. Recent training courses have covered how to start a successful academy and addressing changes to the primary school curriculum.

In addition to the CPD events, the National Education Trust aims to promote debate and discussion on policy issues surrounding education. Past lecturers have included Estelle Morris, who spoke in March 2008 on the dichotomy between policy pronouncements and their implementation in the classroom. Shami Chakrabarti gave the third annual lecture in March 2009, and Alan Milburn delivered the 2010 lecture on 'Unleashing Aspiration'. This continued along the lines of the report he produced in the summer of 2009 regarding equal access from all social classes to the professions.

== NET Academies Trust ==
The NET Academies Trust is a Department for Education approved multi academy sponsor. The charity is currently a sponsor for Battle Primary Academy in Reading; and Henry Hinde Junior School in Rugby.
