= Rodney Dethridge =

English cricketer

Personal information
- Full name: Frank Rodney Dethridge
- Born: 13 September 1961 (age 65); Pembury, Kent
- Batting: Right-handed
- Bowling: Right-arm fast-medium

Domestic team information
- Years: Team
- 1982–1983: Bedfordshire

Career statistics
Competition	List A
Matches	1
Runs scored	31
Batting average	31.00
100s/50s	0/0
Top score	31
Balls bowled	42
Wickets	1
Bowling average	21.00
5 wickets in innings	0
10 wickets in match	0
Best bowling	1/21
Catches/stumpings	0/–
- Source: Cricinfo, 28 May 2011

Frank Rodney Dethridge (born 13 September 1961) is a former English cricketer. Dethridge was a right-handed batsman who bowled right-arm fast-medium. He was born in Pembury, Kent.

Dethridge made his debut for Bedfordshire in the 1982 Minor Counties Championship against Hertfordshire. Dethridge played Minor counties cricket for Bedfordshire until 1983, which included 11 Minor Counties Championship matches. He made his only List A appearance against Somerset in the 1982 NatWest Trophy. In this match, he scored 31 runs before being run out. With the ball, he claimed a single wicket, that of Vic Marks, for the cost of 21 runs from 7 overs. His performance in this match earned him the man-of-the-match award.

Dethridge also played for Durham University, where he took a degree in Zoology followed by a teaching certificate. He was part of the Kent Second XI (1982) in the Second XI Championship and later represented Berkshire (1985) and Free Foresters (1994–1998).
