= William Atkinson (teacher) =

British head teacher (born 1950)

Sir William Atkinson DL
- Born: William Samuel Atkinson; 9 April 1950; Jamaica
- Occupation: Educator
- Years active: 1971–2014
- Known for: Head teacher of Phoenix High School

Sir William Samuel Atkinson DL (born 9 April 1950) is a Jamaican-born British head teacher who "turned around" Phoenix High School, a secondary school near White City, London. He also contributed to Channel 4's The Unteachables, and was the inspiration behind Lenny Henry's character in the 1999 BBC TV series Hope and Glory. He is a graduate of King's College London (MA, 1980), and has helped many students with their lives.

== Biography ==
William Atkinson was born in Jamaica and moved to England at the age of seven, settling with his family in Battersea, South London.

Atkinson was knighted in the 2008 Birthday Honours for services to Education and to Community Relations.
