= Cattle Market Ground =

Cricket ground in Islington, London, England

Coordinates: 51.54463°N 0.12121°W

Ground information
- Location: Islington, London
- Establishment: 1863

Team information
Middlesex	(1864-1868)
South	(1864)
Gentlemen of Middlesex	(1865)
Gentlemen of the South	(1867)
- As of 3 September 2010; Source: profile

Cattle Market Ground was a cricket ground in Islington, London (formerly Middlesex). The first recorded match on the ground was in 1863, when Middlesex Clubs played a United England Eleven.

In 1864, the ground held its first first-class match when Middlesex played Sussex. From 1864 to 1868, the ground played host to 16 first-class matches involving Middlesex, the last of which saw them play Surrey. The ground also held first-class matches for the South in 1864, Gentlemen of Middlesex in 1865 and the Gentlemen of the South in 1867.

The last recorded match held on the ground came in September 1868 when the Gentlemen of Middlesex played the Australian Aboriginals during their tour of England. The ground closed when the owner of the hotel whose pitch it was decided to sell the land for development. The hotel itself was situated next to the Metropolitan Cattle Market, although its exact placing is unknown.
