= John Childs (cricketer) =

English cricketer

Personal information
- Full name: John Henry Childs
- Born: 15 August 1951 (age 75); Lipson, Plymouth, Devon, England
- Nickname: Charlie
- Batting: Left-handed
- Bowling: Slow left-arm orthodox

International information
- National side: England
- Test debut: 30 June 1988 v West Indies
- Last Test: 4 August 1988 v West Indies

Career statistics
Competition	Test	First-class
Matches	2	381
Runs scored	2	1,690
Batting average	–	9.08
100s/50s	0/0	0/0
Top score	2*	43
Balls bowled	516	70,667
Wickets	3	1,028
Bowling average	61.00	29.76
5 wickets in innings	0	52
10 wickets in match	0	8
Best bowling	1/13	9/56
Catches/stumpings	1/–	116/–
- Source: CricInfo, 10 September 2022

John Henry Childs (born 15 August 1951) is a former cricketer who played in two Test matches for England in 1988. At the age of 36 years 320 days, Childs became the oldest player since Dick Howorth in 1947 to make his England debut. He was a left-arm spin bowler, and played his domestic cricket for Gloucestershire and Essex.

== Life and career ==
Childs began his professional cricket career with Gloucestershire, staying there for ten seasons. He was released at the end of the 1984 season, and was taken on by Essex for the following season. Cricket writer, Colin Bateman, noted, "A change of county at the age of 33 proved an inspired move for John Childs. In his first season he played in every championship game but took only three wickets. Called to county HQ around Christmas, he expected to be discharged but, instead was sent to see Fred Titmus who spotted his delivery had slowed down and the following season he took 106 wickets and never looked back. Coaching at Essex, particularly from Fred Titmus, extended his run-up and brought success".

He was named a Wisden cricketer of the year in 1987, having helped Essex to the County Championship.

Childs was England's oldest debutant for forty one years when he was selected to play against the West Indies at Old Trafford in 1988. He took one wicket for 91 runs, dismissing Carl Hooper lbw and scored two runs without being out in either innings, as England fell to an innings defeat. He played one further Test in that series, at The Oval, taking the wickets of Malcolm Marshall and Gordon Greenidge and being left not out without scoring in both innings, as the West Indies won by 8 wickets. He was selected to tour India the following winter; that trip was cancelled on political grounds.

In July 1992, Childs, by now aged 40, was selected for the England squad again for the game at Headingley against Pakistan, but failed to make the final Test team. He eventually retired from professional cricket, having played 381 first-class games and taken over 1,000 first-class wickets at under 30 apiece.
