= Tony Goodgame =

English footballer (1946–2022)

- Born: Anthony Alan Goodgame; 19 February 1946; Hammersmith, Greater London, England
- Died: 17 November 2022 (aged 76); Chichester, West Sussex, England
- Other names: Henry Goodforth (nickname)
- Occupation: Professional footballer (left back)
- Years active: 1966–1983
- Known for: Fulham F.C.; Leyton Orient F.C.; Hillingdon Borough F.C.; Crawley Town F.C.; Ruislip F.C.
- Spouse: Shirley Scrivener (m. 1971)
- Children: 2

Anthony Alan Goodgame (19 February 1946 – 17 November 2022) was an English professional left back footballer. In a career that spanned nearly 17 years, he appeared in the Football League as a left back, and was best known as a Fulham F.C., Leyton Orient F.C., Hillingdon Borough F.C., Crawley Town F.C., and Ruislip F.C. player.

== Career ==
Goodgame, a left back, made his debut as a professional footballer at Fulham F.C. in May 1966, at the age of 20. He transferred to Leyton Orient F.C. in 1966, before transferring to Crawley Town F.C. in 1966. He made appearances for other teams, including Tonbridge Angels F.C., Valley United FC, and Chelsea F.C., amongst others. In 1976, Ruislip F.C. signed the former Hillingdon Borough F.C. player.

Goodgame retired in June 1983, after nearly 17 years in the industry, aged 37.

== Controversies ==
On 17 October 1966, following a 2–2 result against Colchester United F.C., Goodgame and Dick Graham, the then-manager of Leyton Orient F.C., were punched by angry fans as they left the Layer Road stadium. Terry Bradbury came to Graham's defense, punching two teenagers.

Goodgame's surname often got a reaction from fans when his name was revealed.

== Personal life ==
Goodgame married Shirley Scrivener five years after meeting her at a dance at the Hammersmith Palais. They had two children.

Goodgame died at his home in Chichester, West Sussex, on 17 November 2022. He was 76.
