= 1986 NatWest Trophy =

- Administrator(s): Test and County Cricket Board
- Cricket format: Limited overs cricket (60 overs per innings)
- Tournament format(s): Knockout
- Champions: Sussex (4th title)
- Participants: 32
- Matches: 31
- Most runs: 202 Allan Green (Sussex)
- Most wickets: 11 Imran Khan (Sussex)

The 1986 NatWest Trophy was the 6th NatWest Trophy. It was an English limited overs county cricket tournament which was held between 25 June and 6 September 1986. The tournament was won by Sussex who defeated Lancashire by 7 wickets in the final at Lord's.

== Summary ==
The seventeen first-class counties, were joined by thirteen Minor Counties: Berkshire, Cambridgeshire, Cheshire, Cornwall, Cumberland, Devon, Dorset, Durham, Hertfordshire, Northumberland, Oxfordshire, Staffordshire and Suffolk. The Ireland and Scotland teams also participated.

Teams who won in the first round progressed to the second round. The winners in the second round then progressed to the quarter-final stage. Winners from the quarter-finals then progressed to the semi-finals from which the winners then went on to the final at Lord's which was held on 6 September 1986.

In the first round at Derby, Derbyshire batsmen Alan Hill and Iain Anderson put on a then record partnership for any wicket in limited overs cricket. 286, for the 2nd wicket versus Cornwall. The semi-final between Worcestershire and Sussex at Worcester took three days to complete due to bad weather. Sussex won by 5 wickets and Imran Khan was the man of the match. At The Oval, Lancashire won by 4 runs Trevor Jesty scored 112 and was man of the match for Surrey.

In the final, Ian Gould's Sussex beat Lancashire by 7 wickets. Medium pace bowler Dermot Reeve took 4-20 and was man of the match. Paul Parker scored the highest score of the game, 85. This was the last big game for Lancashire, and former West Indies, captain Clive Lloyd who retired at the end of the season.

=== First round ===
25 June 1986
(scorecard)

Gloucestershire; 249/9 (60 overs)	v	Berkshire; 129 all out (37.3 overs)
Andy Stovold 58; Peter Lewington 3/23 (12 overs)		Mark Simmons 26; David Lawrence 4/36 (8 overs)

Gloucestershire won by 120 runs
Courages Cricket Ground, Reading
Umpires: Derek Dennis & David Evans
Player of the match: David Lawrence (Gloucestershire)

25 June 1986
(scorecard)

Surrey; 198/9 (60 overs)	v	Cheshire; 159 all out (55.4 overs)
Grahame Clinton 49; Barry Wood 4/56 (12 overs)		Neil O'Brien 23; Tony Gray 3/23 (12 overs)

Surrey won by 39 runs
Oxton Cricket Club Ground, Oxton
Umpires: Barrie Meyer & Clive Smith
Player of the match: Alan Butcher (Surrey)

25 June 1986
(scorecard)

Derbyshire; 365/3 (60 overs)	v	Cornwall; 161 all out (58.1 overs)
Alan Hill 153; David Toseland 2/41 (12 overs)		Philip Stephens 54; Reg Sharma 4/29 (12 overs)

Derbyshire won by 204 runs
County Ground, Derby
Umpires: Arthur Jepson & Mervyn Kitchen
Player of the match: Alan Hill (Derbyshire)

25 June 1986
(scorecard)

Nottinghamshire; 212/8 (60 overs)	v	Devon; 153/8 (60 overs)
Derek Randall 53; Keith Donohue 3/42 (12 overs)		Nick Gaywood 49; Richard Hadlee 2/10 (9 overs)

Nottinghamshire won by 59 runs
The Maer Ground, Exmouth
Umpires: John Harris & David Shepherd
Player of the match: Nick Gaywood (Devon)

25 June 1986
(scorecard)

Hertfordshire; 122 all out (58.3 overs)	v	Hampshire; 124/6 (41.2 overs)
Francis Collyer 26; Nigel Cowley 3/19 (12 overs)		Chris Smith 25; Robert Hailey 4/32 (12 overs)

Hampshire won by 4 wickets
County Ground, Southampton
Umpires: John Holder & Ray Julian
Player of the match: Robert Hailey (Hertfordshire)

25 June 1986
(scorecard)

Cumberland; 178/5 (60 overs)	v	Lancashire; 179/2 (51.2 overs)
Steven Sharp 40*; John Abrahams 2/26 (12 overs)		John Abrahams 67*; David Halliwell 1/29 (12 overs)

Lancashire won by 8 wickets
Old Trafford, Manchester
Umpires: Mike Hendrick & Allan Jones
Player of the match: John Abrahams (Lancashire)

25 June 1986
(scorecard)

Leicestershire; 305/5 (60 overs)	v	Ireland; 138/4 (60 overs)
David Gower 121*; Hugh Milling 4/63 (12 overs)		Mark Cohen 32; Phil DeFreitas 1/18 (7 overs)

Leicestershire won by 167 runs
Grace Road, Leicester
Umpires: Bob Duckett & Nigel Plews
Player of the match: David Gower (Leicestershire)

25 June 1986
(scorecard)

Northamptonshire; 259 all out (60 overs)	v	Middlesex; 262/3 (59 overs)
Allan Lamb 80; Wayne Daniel 4/33 (12 overs)		Mike Gatting 118*; David Capel 1/29 (12 overs)

Middlesex won by 7 wickets
County Ground, Northampton
Umpires: Kevin Lyons & Peter Wight
Player of the match: Mike Gatting (Middlesex)

25 June 1986
(scorecard)

Essex; 298/9 (60 overs)	v	Northumberland; 219/5 (60 overs)
Alan Lilley 113; Peter Graham 2/28 (12 overs)		Kenneth Pearson 61; Neil Foster 2/30 (12 overs)

Essex won by 79 runs
Osborne Avenue, Jesmond
Umpires: Barrie Leadbeater & David Lloyd
Player of the match: Alan Lilley (Essex)

25 June 1986
(scorecard)

Dorset; 132 all out (54.1 overs)	v	Somerset; 135/2 (33.2 overs)
Andrew Kennedy 39; Joel Garner 4/36 (9 overs)		Nigel Felton 59*; Andrew Kennedy 1/6 (4 overs)

Somerset won by 8 wickets
County Ground, Taunton
Umpires: Sam Cook & David Halfyard
Player of the match: Nigel Felton (Somerset)

25 June 1986
(scorecard)

Glamorgan; 205/7 (60 overs)	v	Staffordshire; 144 all out (49.3 overs)
Rodney Ontong 54*; David Cartledge 2/21 (8 overs)		David Banks 37; Geoff Holmes 3/21 (12 overs)

Glamorgan won by 61 runs
Lichfield Road, Stone
Umpires: John Jameson & Terry Spencer
Player of the match: Rodney Ontong (Glamorgan)

25 June 1986
(scorecard)

Suffolk; 108 all out (49 overs)	v	Sussex; 109/3 (35.1 overs)
Kevin Brooks 26*; Imran Khan 3/27 (12 overs)		Paul Parker 40*; Peter Hayes 1/8 (9 overs)

Sussex won by 7 wickets
County Ground, Hove
Umpires: Barry Dudleston & Donald Thompsett
Player of the match: Dermot Reeve (Sussex)

25 June 1986
(scorecard)

Warwickshire; 317/8 (60 overs)	v	Durham; 182 all out (55.1 overs)
Alvin Kallicharran 99 (119); Peter Kippax 3/61 (12 overs)		Ashok Patel 59 (64); Anton Ferreira 3/28 (10 overs)

Warwickshire won by 135 runs
Edgbaston, Birmingham
Umpires: Roy Palmer & Alan Whitehead
Player of the match: Alvin Kallicharran (Warwickshire)

25 June 1986
(scorecard)

Worcestershire; 292/6 (60 overs)	v	Oxfordshire; 148/3 (60 overs)
Damian D'Oliveira 99; Simon Porter 3/58 (11 overs)		Geoffrey Ford 50; Dipak Patel 1/8 (7 overs)

Worcestershire won by 244 runs
New Road, Worcester
Umpires: Peter Eele & Bob White
Player of the match: Damian D'Oliveira (Worcestershire)

25 June 1986
(scorecard)

Cambridgeshire; 176/8 (60 overs)	v	Yorkshire; 177/3 (53.1 overs)
Justin Benson 85; Peter Hartley 3/49 (12 overs)		Martyn Moxon 75; Martin Stephenson 1/42 (10 overs)

Yorkshire won by 7 wickets
Headingley, Leeds
Umpires: Don Oslear & Harold Rhodes
Player of the match: Justin Benson (Cambridgeshire)

25 June 1986
(scorecard)

Scotland; 165 all out (58.5 overs)	v	Kent; 166/2 (53.2 overs)
Richard Swan 64*; Graham Dilley 5/29 (9.5 overs)		Chris Cowdrey 62*; Alan Stevenson 1/31 (9 overs)

Kent won by 8 wickets
Myreside, Edinburgh
Umpires: John Hampshire & Tommy Wilson
Player of the match: Graham Dilley (Kent)

=== Second round ===
9 July 1986
(scorecard)

Surrey; 229/7 (60 overs)	v	Derbyshire; 167 all out (53.5 overs)
Jack Richards 53*; Martin Jean-Jacques 3/43 (12 overs)		Kim Barnett 47; Andrew Needham 4/32 (12 overs)

Surrey won by 62 runs
County Ground, Derby
Umpires: Don Oslear & Bob White
Player of the match: Jack Richards (Surrey)

9, 10 July 1986
(scorecard)

Gloucestershire; 177 all out (55.4 overs)	v	Leicestershire; 179/4 (56.1 overs)
Tony Wright 43; Winston Benjamin 3/28 (10 overs)		Chris Balderstone 66; Phil Bainbridge 2/45 (11 overs)

Leicestershire won by 6 wickets
The Royal & Sun Alliance County Ground, Bristol
Umpires: John Harris & Kevin Lyons
Player of the match: Chris Balderstone (Leicestershire)

- Match was scheduled for one day but extended to two.

9 July 1986
(scorecard)

Worcestershire; 278/5 (60 overs)	v	Hampshire; 212 all out (53.1 overs)
Tim Curtis 94; Cardigan Connor 2/30 (12 overs)		Robin Smith 39; Phil Newport 3/62 (12 overs)

Worcestershire won by 66 runs
County Ground, Southampton
Umpires: Jack Birkenshaw & Allan Jones
Player of the match: Tim Curtis (Worcestershire)

9 July 1986
(scorecard)

Kent; 161/9 (60 overs)	v	Nottinghamshire; 162/4 (41.4 overs)
Simon Hinks 44; Kevin Evans 4/30 (12 overs)		Chris Broad 73; Eldine Baptiste 2/46 (12 overs)

Nottinghamshire won by 6 wickets
Trent Bridge, Nottingham
Umpires: John Jameson & Mervyn Kitchen
Player of the match: Chris Broad (Nottinghamshire)

9 July 1986
(scorecard)

Lancashire; 221 all out (60 overs)	v	Somerset; 218/9 (60 overs)
Gehan Mendis 72; Nick Taylor 3/47 (12 overs)		Jon Hardy 53; Mike Watkinson 3/44 (12 overs)

Lancashire won by 3 runs
County Ground, Taunton
Umpires: David Evans & Ray Julian
Player of the match: Gehan Mendis (Lancashire)

9 July 1986
(scorecard)

Sussex; 269/8 (60 overs)	v	Glamorgan; 240 all out (59.2 overs)
Allan Green 102; Simon Base 2/49 (12 overs)		John Hopkins 47; Imran Khan 3/16 (11.2 overs)

Sussex won by 29 runs
County Ground, Hove
Umpires: Barry Dudleston & Roy Palmer
Player of the match: Imran Khan (Sussex)

9 July 1986
(scorecard)

Warwickshire; 225 all out (59.5 overs)	v	Essex; 191 all out (51.4 overs)
Geoff Humpage 70; Graham Gooch 3/31 (12 overs)		John Stephenson 55; Brian McMillan 3/54 (11.4 overs)

Warwickshire won by 64 runs
Edgbaston, Birmingham
Umpires: John Hampshire & John Holder
Player of the match: Geoff Humpage (Warwickshire)

9, 10 July 1986
(scorecard)

Yorkshire; 205/9 (60 overs)	v	Middlesex; 185 all out (57.3 overs)
Phil Robinson 66; Norman Cowans 4/24 (10 overs)		Andrew Miller 34; Paul Jarvis 3/32 (10.3 overs)

Yorkshire won by 20 runs
Headingley, Leeds
Umpires: Barrie Leadbeater & Peter Wight
Player of the match: Martyn Moxon (Yorkshire)

- Match was scheduled for one day but extended to two.

=== Quarter-finals ===
30, 31 July, 1 August 1986
(scorecard)

Leicestershire; 223/8 (60 overs)	v	Lancashire; 226/4 (53.3 overs)
Phil DeFreitas 69; Paul Allott 4/28 (12 overs)		Neil Fairbrother 93*; Les Taylor 2/35 (9 overs)

Lancashire won by 6 wickets
Grace Road, Leicester
Umpires: Barrie Leadbeater & Don Oslear
Player of the match: Neil Fairbrother (Lancashire)

- Match was scheduled for one day but extended to three.

30 July 1986
(scorecard)

Surrey; 204/9 (60 overs)	v	Nottinghamshire; 158 all out (51.5 overs)
David Thomas 65; Richard Hadlee 5/17 (12 overs)		Richard Hadlee 55; Graham Monkhouse 3/35 (8.5 overs)

Surrey won by 46 runs
The Oval, London
Umpires: David Constant & Nigel Plews
Player of the match: Richard Hadlee (Nottinghamshire)

30, 31 July 1986
(scorecard)

Warwickshire; 136/8 (60 overs)	v	Worcestershire; 137/2 (39.3 overs)
Alvin Kallicharran 39; Neal Radford 3/23 (12 overs)		David Smith 62; Anton Ferreira 1/24 (9.3 overs)

Worcestershire won by 8 wickets
New Road, Worcester
Umpires: David Evans & David Shepherd
Player of the match: David Smith (Worcestershire)

- Match was scheduled for one day but extended to two.

30, 31 July 1986
(scorecard)

Sussex; 213/7 (60 overs)	v	Yorkshire; 125 all out (38.3 overs)
Ian Gould 88; Peter Hartley 3/47 (12 overs)		Phil Carrick 54; Garth Le Roux 4/17 (10.3 overs)

Sussex won by 88 runs
Headingley, Leeds
Umpires: Jack Birkenshaw & John Holder
Player of the match: Ian Gould (Sussex)

- Match was scheduled for one day but extended to two.

=== Semi-finals ===
13 August 1986
(scorecard)

Lancashire; 229 all out (58.3 overs)	v	Surrey; 225 all out (58.5 overs)
Clive Lloyd 65; Sylvester Clarke 4/21 (11.3 overs)		Trevor Jesty 112; Paul Allott 3/47 (12 overs)

Lancashire won by 4 runs
The Oval, London
Umpires: Nigel Plews & Alan Whitehead
Player of the match: Trevor Jesty (Surrey)

13, 14, 15 August 1986
(scorecard)

Worcestershire; 125 all out (51 overs)	v	Sussex; 126/5 (49 overs)
Tim Curtis 22; Imran Khan 3/26 (12 overs)		Colin Wells 45*; Neal Radford 3/20 (12 overs)

Sussex won by 5 wickets
New Road, Worcester
Umpires: Don Oslear & Roy Palmer
Player of the match: Imran Khan (Sussex)

- Match was scheduled for one day but extended to three.

=== Final ===
6 September 1986
(scorecard)

Lancashire; 242/8 (60 overs)	v	Sussex; 243/3 (58.2 overs)
Neil Fairbrother 63 (108); Dermot Reeve 4/20 (12 overs)		Paul Parker 85 (112); Jack Simmons 1/31 (12 overs)

Sussex won by 7 wickets
Lord's, London
Umpires: Dickie Bird & Ken Palmer
Player of the match: Dermot Reeve (Sussex)
