= 1987 NatWest Trophy =

- Administrator: Test and County Cricket Board
- Cricket format: Limited overs cricket (60 overs per innings)
- Tournament format: Knockout
- Champions: Nottinghamshire (1st title)
- Participants: 32
- Matches: 31
- Most runs: 294 Wayne Larkins (Northamptonshire)
- Most wickets: 10 Derek Underwood (Kent); 10 Allan Donald (Warwickshire)

The 1987 NatWest Trophy was the 7th NatWest Trophy. It was an English limited overs county cricket tournament which was held between 24 June and 5 September 1987. The tournament was won by Nottinghamshire who defeated Northamptonshire by 3 wickets in the final at Lord's.

== Format ==
The seventeen first-class counties, were joined by thirteen Minor Counties: Buckinghamshire, Cambridgeshire, Cheshire, Cumberland, Devon, Dorset, Durham, Hertfordshire, Northumberland, Oxfordshire, Staffordshire, Suffolk and Wiltshire. The Ireland and Scotland teams also participated. Teams who won in the first round progressed to the second round. The winners in the second round then progressed to the quarter-final stage. Winners from the quarter-finals then progressed to the semi-finals from which the winners then went on to the final at Lord's which was held on 5 September 1987.

=== First round ===
24 June 1987
(scorecard)

Buckinghamshire; 154 all out (59.5 overs)	v	Somerset; 147 all out (59.3 overs)
Andrew Harwood 47; Neil Mallender 2/27 (12 overs)		Ricky Bartlett 56; Stephen Burrow 3/32 (9 overs)

Buckinghamshire won by 7 runs
London Road, High Wycombe
Umpires: Sam Cook & Barrie Meyer
Player of the match: Stephen Edwards (Buckinghamshire)

24 June 1987
(scorecard)

Cambridgeshire; 97 all out (40.3 overs)	v	Derbyshire; 92/4 (38.4 overs)
Mike Garnham 31; Alan Warner 3/20 (9 overs)		Bruce Roberts 33; Adrian Wykes 2/14 (7 overs)

Derbyshire won by 6 runs
Wisbech Cricket Club Ground, Wisbech
Umpires: Bob Duckett & Peter Wight
Player of the match: Alan Warner (Derbyshire)

24 June 1987
(scorecard)

Durham; 151/8 (60 overs)	v	Middlesex; 155/3 (50.2 overs)
Stephen Greensword 56 (156); John Emburey 2/14 (12 overs)		Mike Gatting 45* (58); Peter Kippax 2/24 (12 overs)

Middlesex won by 7 wickets
Feethams Cricket Ground, Darlington
Umpires: John Hampshire & Tommy Wilson
Player of the match: Peter Kippax (Durham)

24 June 1987
(scorecard)

Glamorgan; 230/7 (60 overs)	v	Cheshire; 85 all out (38.1 overs)
Geoff Holmes 57; John O'Brien 2/38 (12 overs)		Ian Tansley 17; Steve Monkhouse 5/32 (12 overs)

Glamorgan won by 145 runs
Sophia Gardens, Cardiff
Umpires: Derek Dennis & Mervyn Kitchen
Player of the match: Geoff Holmes (Glamorgan)

24 June 1987
(scorecard)

Hampshire; 304/2 (60 overs)	v	Dorset; 95 all out (29.4 overs)
Chris Smith 140*; Christopher Stone 1/41 (12 overs)		Ian Stuart 23*; Kevan James 3/22 (7.4 overs)

Hampshire won by 209 runs
County Ground, Southampton
Umpires: Dickie Bird & John Harris
Player of the match: Chris Smith (Hampshire)

24 June 1987
(scorecard)

Gloucestershire; 277/7 (60 overs)	v	Lancashire; 236 all out (55.2 overs)
Tony Wright 88; Jack Simmons 3/39 (12 overs)		Neil Fairbrother 87; David Lawrence 4/49 (10.2 overs)

Gloucestershire won by 41 runs
Old Trafford, Manchester
Umpires: Jack Birkenshaw & Barrie Leadbeater
Player of the match: David Graveney (Gloucestershire)

24 June 1987
(scorecard)

Oxfordshire; 181/8 (60 overs)	v	Leicestershire; 185/4 (47.5 overs)
Simon Porter 44; Jon Agnew 3/31 (12 overs)		Russell Cobb 66*; David Hale 2/35 (10 overs)

Leicestershire won by 6 wickets
Grace Road, Leicester
Umpires: Barry Dudleston & David Shepherd
Player of the match: Russell Cobb (Leicestershire)

24 June 1987
(scorecard)

Northamptonshire; 198 all out (59.1 overs)	v	Ireland; 110 all out (49.4 overs)
Geoff Cook 50; Jon Garth 3/28 (11.1 overs)		Garfield Harrison 23; Alan Walker 4/7 (9 overs)

Northamptonshire won by 88 runs
County Ground, Northampton
Umpires: Roy Palmer & Bob White
Player of the match: Alan Walker (Northamptonshire)

24, 25, 26 June 1987
(scorecard)

Essex; 247/8 (60 overs)	v	Northumberland; 71 all out (43.2 overs)
Graham Gooch 76; Mike Younger 2/32 (9 overs)		Paul Dutton 18; Neil Foster 4/9 (8 overs)

Essex won by 176 runs
Osborne Avenue, Jesmond
Umpires: Brian Harrison & John Jameson
Player of the match: Neil Foster (Essex)

- Match was scheduled for one day but extended to three.

24 June 1987
(scorecard)

Suffolk; 94 all out (49 overs)	v	Nottinghamshire; 95/2 (25.2 overs)
Michael McEvoy 27; Clive Rice 4/19 (11 overs)		Chris Broad 37; Peter Hayes 2/14 (8 overs)

Nottinghamshire won by 8 wickets
Trent Bridge, Nottingham
Umpires: Ray Julian & Ken Palmer
Player of the match: Kevin Cooper (Nottinghamshire)

24 June 1987
(scorecard)

Warwickshire; 226/6 (60 overs)	v	Staffordshire; 149 all out (56.4 overs)
Geoff Humpage 76; Dipak Patel 2/26 (12 overs)		Steven Dean 72; Allan Donald 5/24 (10.4 overs)

Warwickshire won by 77 runs
Ind Coope Ground, Burton upon Trent
Umpires: Nigel Plews & Harold Rhodes
Player of the match: Geoff Humpage (Warwickshire)

24 June 1987
(scorecard)

Hertfordshire; 162/8 (60 overs)	v	Surrey; 164/2 (45 overs)
Stephen Dean 42; Ian Greig 3/32 (8 overs)		Alec Stewart 66*; Brian Collins 1/22 (9 overs)

Surrey won by 8 wickets
The Oval, London
Umpires: Arthur Jepson & Don Oslear
Player of the match: Alec Stewart (Surrey)

24 June 1987
(scorecard)

Cumberland; 182/8 (60 overs)	v	Sussex; 187/2 (43.3 overs)
Grahame Clarke 61; Tony Pigott 3/25 (12 overs)		Allan Green 84; Malcolm Woods 2/33 (8 overs)

Sussex won by 8 wickets
County Ground, Hove
Umpires: Kevin Lyons & Terry Spencer
Player of the match: Allan Green (Sussex)

24 June 1987
(scorecard)

Yorkshire; 304/7 (60 overs)	v	Wiltshire; 175 all out (58 overs)
Ashley Metcalfe 85; Richard Cooper 2/38 (9 overs)		Jeremy Newman 62; Kevin Sharp 4/40 (9 overs)

Yorkshire won by 129 runs
Trowbridge Cricket Club Ground, Trowbridge
Umpires: David Evans & David Halfyard
Player of the match: Ashley Metcalfe (Yorkshire)

24 June 1987
(scorecard)

Worcestershire; 404/3 (60 overs)	v	Devon; 105 all out (36 overs)
Graeme Hick 172*; John Tierney 2/84 (12 overs)		Hiley Edwards 17; Richard Illingworth 4/20 (8 overs)

Worcestershire won by 299 runs
New Road, Worcester
Umpires: Basher Hassan & Allan Jones
Player of the match: Graeme Hick (Worcestershire)

24 June 1987
(scorecard)

Scotland; 74 all out (35.1 overs)	v	Kent; 75/4 (23 overs)
Sandy Brown 18; Derek Underwood 8/31 (11.1 overs)		Chris Cowdrey 34*; Peter Duthie 2/23 (9 overs)

Kent won by 6 wickets
Myreside, Edinburgh
Umpires: John Holder & David Lloyd
Player of the match: Derek Underwood (Kent)

=== Second round ===
8 July 1987
(scorecard)

Essex; 194/9 (60 overs)	v	Worcestershire; 179 all out (56.3 overs)
Graham Gooch 34; Neal Radford 3/56 (12 overs)		Graeme Hick 55; Don Topley 4/36 (12 overs)

Essex won by 15 runs
County Ground, Chelmsford
Umpires: Ray Julian & Bob White
Player of the match: Don Topley (Essex)

8 July 1987
(scorecard)

Kent; 232/8 (60 overs)	v	Derbyshire; 233/9 (59.2 overs)
Neil Taylor 85; Paul Newman 3/40 (12 overs)		Bruce Roberts 60; Alan Igglesden 3/54 (12 overs)

Derbyshire won by 1 wicket
St Lawrence Ground, Canterbury
Umpires: John Jameson & Barrie Leadbeater
Player of the match: Michael Holding (Derbyshire)

8 July 1987
(scorecard)

Leicestershire; 341/6 (60 overs)	v	Hampshire; 326/9 (60 overs)
Peter Willey 154; Tim Tremlett 2/81 (12 overs)		Mark Nicholas 60; Winston Benjamin 3/57 (12 overs)

Leicestershire won by 15 runs
Grace Road, Leicester
Umpires: Alan Whitehead & Peter Wight
Player of the match: Peter Willey (Leicestershire)

8 July 1987
(scorecard)

Nottinghamshire; 279 all out (59.3 overs)	v	Middlesex; 219 all out (57.2 overs)
Tim Robinson 79; Wayne Daniel 3/37 (11.3 overs)		Mike Gatting 73; Andrew Pick 3/39 (12 overs)

Nottinghamshire won by 60 runs
Uxbridge Cricket Club Ground, Uxbridge
Umpires: Allan Jones & Don Oslear
Player of the match: Tim Robinson (Nottinghamshire)

8 July 1987
(scorecard)

Surrey; 211 all out (58.3 overs)	v	Northamptonshire; 213/5 (58.5 overs)
Alec Stewart 44; Roger Harper 3/40 (12 overs)		Allan Lamb 88; Sylvester Clarke 2/41 (12 overs)

Northamptonshire won by 5 wickets
County Ground, Northampton
Umpires: David Constant & John Harris
Player of the match: Allan Lamb (Northamptonshire)

8 July 1987
(scorecard)

Sussex; 242/8 (60 overs)	v	Gloucestershire; 243/5 (58.3 overs)
Allan Green 84; David Graveney 4/48 (12 overs)		Tony Wright 76; Tony Pigott 2/36 (12 overs)

Gloucestershire won by 5 wickets
County Ground, Hove
Umpires: Jack Birkenshaw & Kevin Lyons
Player of the match: David Graveney (Gloucestershire)

8 July 1987
(scorecard)

Warwickshire; 329/5 (60 overs)	v	Buckinghamshire; 128 all out (41.4 overs)
Andy Moles 127; Gary Black 2/54 (10 overs)		Andrew Harwood 57; Norman Gifford 4/9 (7 overs)

Warwickshire won by 201 runs
Edgbaston, Birmingham
Umpires: John Hampshire & David Lloyd
Player of the match: Andy Moles (Warwickshire)

8 July 1987
(scorecard)

Glamorgan; 83 all out (28.2 overs)	v	Yorkshire; 84/1 (24 overs)
Greg Thomas 33; Arnie Sidebottom 5/27 (9 overs)		Martyn Moxon 43*; Ian Smith 1/18 (4 overs)

Yorkshire won by 9 wickets
Headingley, Leeds
Umpires: Mervyn Kitchen & Nigel Plews
Player of the match: Arnie Sidebottom (Yorkshire)

=== Quarter-finals ===
29, 30 July 1987
(scorecard)

Nottinghamshire; 268/8 (60 overs)	v	Derbyshire; 211 all out (55.5 overs)
Chris Broad 67; Martin Jean-Jacques 3/73 (12 overs)		Iain Anderson 54*; Eddie Hemmings 3/28 (12 overs)

Nottinghamshire won by 57 runs
County Ground, Derby
Umpires: Mervyn Kitchen & Barrie Leadbeater
Player of the match: Eddie Hemmings (Nottinghamshire)

- Match was scheduled for one day but extended to two.

29, 30 July 1987
(scorecard)

Essex; 204/5 (60 overs)	v	Northamptonshire; 205/4 (56.4 overs)
Brian Hardie 56; Richard Williams 2/33 (9 overs)		Wayne Larkins 121*; Allan Border 1/1 (0.4 overs)

Northamptonshire won by 5 wickets
County Ground, Chelmsford
Umpires: John Hampshire & Ray Julian
Player of the match: Wayne Larkins (Northamptonshire)

- Match was scheduled for one day but extended to two.

29 July 1987
(scorecard)

Warwickshire; 203/7 (60 overs)	v	Gloucestershire; 207/5 (46.2 overs)
Geoffrey Tedstone 55*; Courtney Walsh 2/42 (12 overs)		Andy Stovold 94; Allan Donald 2/37 (9 overs)

Gloucestershire won by 5 wickets
The Royal & Sun Alliance County Ground, Bristol
Umpires: David Constant & Ken Palmer
Player of the match: Andy Stovold (Gloucestershire)

29, 30 July 1987
(scorecard)

Leicestershire; 236/9 (60 overs)	v	Yorkshire; 200 all out (56.5 overs)
David Gower 49; Paul Jarvis 4/41 (12 overs)		Ashley Metcalfe 73; Phil DeFreitas 5/34 (10.5 overs)

Leicestershire won by 36 runs
Headingley, Leeds
Umpires: Barry Dudleston & Roy Palmer
Player of the match: Phil DeFreitas (Leicestershire)

- Match was scheduled for one day but extended to two.

=== Semi-finals ===
12 August 1987
(scorecard)

Nottinghamshire; 225/8 (60 overs)	v	Gloucestershire; 82 all out (35.1 overs)
Chris Broad 65; David Graveney 2/41 (12 overs)		Phil Bainbridge 18; Andrew Pick 5/22 (9.1 overs)

Nottinghamshire won by 143 runs
The Royal & Sun Alliance County Ground, Bristol
Umpires: John Harris & John Holder
Player of the match: Andrew Pick (Nottinghamshire)

12, 13 August 1987
(scorecard)

Northamptonshire; 249/6 (60 overs)	v	Leicestershire; 164 all out (51.2 overs)
Wayne Larkins 58; Peter Willey 1/16 (5 overs)		James Whitaker 37; Richard Williams 4/10 (8 overs)

Northamptonshire won by 85 runs
Grace Road, Leicester
Umpires: Kevin Lyons & Barrie Meyer
Player of the match: David Capel (Northamptonshire)

- Match was scheduled for one day but extended to two.

=== Final ===
5, 7 September 1987
(scorecard)

Northamptonshire; 228/3 (50 overs)	v	Nottinghamshire; 231/7 (49.3 overs)
Wayne Larkins 87 (124); Andrew Pick 1/36 (10 overs)		Richard Hadlee 70(*) (61); Alan Walker 2/38 (10 overs)

Nottinghamshire won by 3 wickets
Lord's, London
Umpires: David Shepherd & Alan Whitehead
Player of the match: Richard Hadlee (Nottinghamshire)

- Match was scheduled for one day but extended to two. Match was reduced to 50 overs per side.
