= 1984 NatWest Trophy =

- Administrator: Test and County Cricket Board
- Cricket format: Limited overs cricket (60 overs per innings)
- Tournament format: Knockout
- Champions: Middlesex (3rd title)
- Participants: 32
- Matches: 31
- Most runs: 396 Alvin Kallicharran (Warwickshire)
- Most wickets: 11 Wayne Daniel (Middlesex)

The 1984 NatWest Trophy was an English limited overs county cricket tournament which was held between 4 July and 1 September 1984. The fourth NatWest Trophy tournament, it was won by Middlesex who defeated Kent by 4 wickets in the final at Lord's.

== Format ==
The seventeen first-class counties were joined by thirteen Minor Counties: Berkshire, Buckinghamshire, Cumberland, Devon, Durham, Hertfordshire, Norfolk, Northumberland, Oxfordshire, Shropshire, Staffordshire, Suffolk and Wiltshire. The Ireland and Scotland teams also participated. Teams who won in the first round progressed to the second round. The winners in the second round then progressed to the quarter-final stage. Winners from the quarter-finals then progressed to the semi-finals from which the winners then went on to the final at Lord's which was held on 1 September 1984.

=== First round ===
4 July 1984
(scorecard)

Cumberland; 121 all out (59.2 overs)	v	Derbyshire; 124/1 (25.1 overs)
Malcolm Woods 36; Kim Barnett 6/24 (9.2 overs)		John Wright 73*; David Lupton 1/27 (6 overs)

Derbyshire won by 9 wickets
Netherfield Cricket Club Ground, Kendal
Umpires: Ray Julian & Tommy Wilson
Player of the match: John Wright (Derbyshire)

4 July 1984
(scorecard)

Northamptonshire; 209/8 (60 overs)	v	Durham; 198 all out (58.5 overs)
Wayne Larkins 77 (148); Stephen Greensword 4/28 (12 overs)		David Jackson 40 (85); Neil Mallender 2/16 (12 overs)

Northamptonshire won by 11 runs
Feethams Cricket Ground, Darlington
Umpires: Arthur Jepson & Jack van Geloven
Player of the match: Stephen Greensword (Durham)

4 July 1984
(scorecard)

Essex; 327/6 (60 overs)	v	Scotland; 137 all out (43.2 overs)
Graham Gooch 133; Dale de Neef 3/37 (12 overs)		Richard Swan 41; David Acfield 3/9 (12 overs)

Essex won by 190 runs
County Ground, Chelmsford
Umpires: Bob Duckett & Barrie Meyer
Player of the match: Graham Gooch (Essex)

4 July 1984
(scorecard)

Glamorgan; 147/9 (60 overs)	v	Nottinghamshire; 148/4 (42.2 overs)
John Steele 31; Kevin Cooper 2/22 (5 overs)		Derek Randall 71; Charles Rowe 2/37 (10 overs)

Nottinghamshire won by 6 wickets
St. Helen's, Swansea
Umpires: John Harris & John Jameson
Player of the match: Derek Randall (Nottinghamshire)

4 July 1984
(scorecard)

Somerset; 153/9 (60 overs)	v	Hertfordshire; 137 all out (59.2 overs)
Brian Rose 36*; William Merry 3/27 (12 overs)		Brian Evans 46; Vic Marks 3/15 (12 overs)

Somerset won by 16 runs
Clarence Park, St Albans
Umpires: Dickie Bird & Barry Dudleston
Player of the match: Brian Evans (Hertfordshire)

4 July 1984
(scorecard)

Kent; 232/7 (60 overs)	v	Berkshire; 143/9 (60 overs)
Chris Cowdrey 64; Paul New 2/28 (12 overs)		Martin Lickley 44; Derek Underwood 3/19 (12 overs)

Kent won by 89 runs
St Lawrence Ground, Canterbury
Umpires: Jack Birkenshaw & Lloyd Budd
Player of the match: Chris Cowdrey (Kent)

4 July 1984
(scorecard)

Lancashire; 272/7 (60 overs)	v	Buckinghamshire; 199/8 (60 overs)
Graeme Fowler 101; Andrew Lyon 3/71 (12 overs)		David Smith 54; Paul Allott 4/34 (11 overs)

Lancashire won by 73 runs
Old Trafford, Manchester
Umpires: David Constant & Bob White
Player of the match: Graeme Fowler (Lancashire)

4 July 1984
(scorecard)

Hampshire; 239/8 (60 overs)	v	Norfolk; 121 all out (43.2 overs)
Mark Nicholas 63; Andrew Agar 2/44 (9 overs)		Quorn Handley 40 (48); Nigel Cowley 5/24 (11.2 overs)

Hampshire won by 118 runs
County Ground, Norwich
Umpires: Don Oslear & Peter Wight
Player of the match: Nigel Cowley (Hampshire)

4 July 1984
(scorecard)

Middlesex; 233/9 (60 overs)	v	Northumberland; 148 all out (54 overs)
Clive Radley 64*; Norman Graham 3/30 (12 overs)		Mike Younger 57; John Emburey 3/20 (12 overs)

Middlesex won by 85 runs
Osborne Avenue, Jesmond
Umpires: Barrie Leadbeater & Tom Spencer
Player of the match: Mike Younger (Northumberland)

4 July 1984
(scorecard)

Shropshire; 229/5 (60 overs)	v	Yorkshire; 192 all out (57.5 overs)
Mushtaq Mohammad 80; Stephen Oldham 2/44 (12 overs)		Phil Carrick 37; Mushtaq Mohammad 3/26 (12 overs)

Shropshire won by 37 runs
St George's Cricket Ground, Telford
Umpires: Allan Jones & Mervyn Kitchen
Player of the match: Mushtaq Mohammad (Shropshire)

4 July 1984
(scorecard)

Staffordshire; 151/8 (60 overs)	v	Gloucestershire; 152/2 (37 overs)
Brendan McArdle 37; John Shepherd 4/20 (12 overs)		Bill Athey 70*; David Blank 1/25 (10 overs)

Gloucestershire won by 8 wickets
Lichfield Road, Stone
Umpires: John Holder & Terry Spencer
Player of the match: John Shepherd (Gloucestershire)

4 July 1984
(scorecard)

Ireland; 157/7 (60 overs)	v	Surrey; 161/3 (48.5 overs)
Stephen Warke 77; Roger Knight 3/13 (12 overs)		Grahame Clinton 79; Garfield Harrison 1/8 (4 overs)

Surrey won by 7 wickets
The Oval, London
Umpires: Ken Palmer & Donald Thompsett
Player of the match: Stephen Warke (Ireland)

4 July 1984
(scorecard)

Sussex; 231/8 (60 overs)	v	Devon; 169/9 (60 overs)
Allan Green 74; Agha Zahid 2/34 (9 overs)		Nick Folland 39; John Barclay 5/53 (12 overs)

Sussex won by 62 runs
County Ground, Hove
Umpires: Derek Dennis & Alan Whitehead
Player of the match: Allan Green (Sussex)

4 July 1984
(scorecard)

Warwickshire; 392/5 (60 overs)	v	Oxfordshire; 165/8 (60 overs)
Alvin Kallicharran 206; Derek Gallop 2/106 (12 overs)		Geoffrey Ford 62; Alvin Kallicharran 6/32 (12 overs)

Warwickshire won by 227 runs
Edgbaston, Birmingham
Umpires: Sam Cook & Roy Palmer
Player of the match: Alvin Kallicharran (Warwickshire)

4 July 1984
(scorecard)

Leicestershire; 354/7 (60 overs)	v	Wiltshire; 209/6 (60 overs)
James Whitaker 155; John Spencer 4/82 (12 overs)		John Rice 75*; Gordon Parsons 2/11 (6 overs)

Leicestershire won by 145 runs
County Cricket Ground, Swindon
Umpires: Bill Alley & Malcolm Heath
Player of the match: James Whitaker (Leicestershire)

4 July 1984
(scorecard)

Suffolk; 149 all out (57.3 overs)	v	Worcestershire; 152/4 (39.1 overs)
Philip Caley 29; Dipak Patel 4/22 (7.2 overs)		Tim Curtis 54*; Colin Graham 2/36 (8.1 overs)

Worcestershire won by 6 wickets
New Road, Worcester
Umpires: Peter Eele & Clive Smith
Player of the match: Tim Curtis (Worcestershire)

=== Second round ===
18 July 1984
(scorecard)

Essex; 121 all out (56.5 overs)	v	Surrey; 122/5 (46.1 overs)
Graham Gooch 64; Roger Knight 2/19 (12 overs)		Alan Butcher 35*; Neil Foster 2/24 (12 overs)

Surrey won by 5 wickets
County Ground, Chelmsford
Umpires: Arthur Jepson & Barrie Leadbeater
Player of the match: Graham Gooch (Essex)

18 July 1984
(scorecard)

Lancashire; 349/6 (60 overs)	v	Gloucestershire; 281 all out (56.5 overs)
Graeme Fowler 122; Gary Sainsbury 3/58 (12 overs)		Paul Romaines 56; Jack Simmons 5/37 (12 overs)

Lancashire won by 68 runs
Phoenix County Ground, Bristol
Umpires: Bill Alley & Ken Palmer
Player of the match: Graeme Fowler (Lancashire)

18 July 1984
(scorecard)

Kent; 250/8 (60 overs)	v	Hampshire; 99 all out (43.3 overs)
Chris Cowdrey 71; Elvis Reifer 4/46 (12 overs)		Trevor Jesty 35; Terry Alderman 4/21 (9.3 overs)

Kent won by 151 runs
County Ground, Southampton
Umpires: John Harris & Nigel Plews
Player of the match: Chris Cowdrey (Kent)

18, 19 July 1984
(scorecard)

Leicestershire; 301/7 (60 overs)	v	Derbyshire; 181 all out (48.4 overs)
David Gower 156; Dallas Moir 2/39 (12 overs)		John Wright 46; Peter Willey 3/33 (12 overs)

Leicestershire won by 120 runs
Grace Road, Leicester
Umpires: Mervyn Kitchen & Bob White
Player of the match: David Gower (Leicestershire)

- Match was scheduled for one day but extended to two.

18 July 1984
(scorecard)

Northamptonshire; 247/5 (60 overs)	v	Worcestershire; 117 all out (36 overs)
Richard Williams 94; John Inchmore 2/29 (12 overs)		Dipak Patel 28; Neil Mallender 7/37 (12 overs)

Northamptonshire won by 130 runs
County Ground, Northampton
Umpires: John Holder & John Jameson
Player of the match: Neil Mallender (Northamptonshire)

18 July 1984
(scorecard)

Middlesex; 228 all out (59.5 overs)	v	Nottinghamshire; 223/8 (60 overs)
Mike Gatting 67; Kevin Saxelby 4/28 (11.5 overs)		Chris Broad 65; Norman Cowans 2/53 (9 overs)

Middlesex won by 5 runs
Trent Bridge, Nottingham
Umpires: Jack Birkenshaw & Ray Julian
Player of the match: John Emburey (Middlesex)

18 July 1984
(scorecard)

Somerset; 288/3 (60 overs)	v	Sussex; 220/9 (60 overs)
Martin Crowe 114; John Barclay 2/46 (8 overs)		Gehan Mendis 55; Ian Botham 3/35 (12 overs)

Somerset won by 68 runs
County Ground, Hove
Umpires: Sam Cook & Barry Dudleston
Player of the match: Martin Crowe (Somerset)

18 July 1984
(scorecard)

Warwickshire; 305/8 (60 overs)	v	Shropshire; 202 all out (59.4 overs)
Robin Dyer 119; Steve Ogrizovic 2/44 (12 overs)		John Foster 56; Paul Smith 3/10 (3.4 overs)

Warwickshire won by 103 runs
Edgbaston, Birmingham
Umpires: Peter Eele & Peter Wight
Player of the match: Robin Dyer (Warwickshire)

=== Quarter-finals ===
1 August 1984
(scorecard)

Middlesex; 276/8 (60 overs)	v	Lancashire; 105 all out (29.4 overs)
Graham Barlow 158; Mike Watkinson 3/63 (12 overs)		Alan Ormrod 19; Wayne Daniel 5/14 (8.4 overs)

Middlesex won by 171 runs
Lord's, London
Umpires: Ken Palmer & Alan Whitehead
Player of the match: Graham Barlow (Middlesex)

1 August 1984
(scorecard)

Leicestershire; 238/9 (60 overs)	v	Northamptonshire; 242/7 (59.1 overs)
Ian Butcher 81; Duncan Wild 3/47 (12 overs)		Robin Boyd-Moss 88*; Paddy Clift 2/43 (12 overs)

Northamptonshire won by 3 wickets
County Ground, Northampton
Umpires: John Holder & Mervyn Kitchen
Player of the match: Robin Boyd-Moss (Northamptonshire)

1 August 1984
(scorecard)

Kent; 275/5 (60 overs)	v	Somerset; 265/5 (60 overs)
Chris Tavaré 103; Martin Crowe 3/33 (12 overs)		Nigel Felton 87; Terry Alderman 2/58 (12 overs)

Kent won by 10 runs
County Ground, Taunton
Umpires: Ray Julian & David Shepherd
Player of the match: Chris Tavaré (Kent)

1 August 1984
(scorecard)

Warwickshire; 303/5 (60 overs)	v	Surrey; 195 all out (51.1 overs)
Alvin Kallicharran 101; Sylvester Clarke 2/42 (12 overs)		David Thomas 53; Chris Old 4/45 (11.1 overs)

Warwickshire won by 110 runs
Edgbaston, Birmingham
Umpires: Roy Palmer & Nigel Plews
Player of the match: Alvin Kallicharran (Warwickshire)

=== Semi-finals ===
15, 16 August 1984
(scorecard)

Northamptonshire; 226/6 (60 overs)	v	Middlesex; 228/2 (54.5 overs)
Rob Bailey 56*; Wayne Daniel 3/33 (12 overs)		Mike Gatting 88*; Duncan Wild 1/50 (11 overs)

Middlesex won by 8 wickets
Lord's, London
Umpires: Roy Palmer & David Shepherd
Player of the match: Wilf Slack (Middlesex)

- Match was scheduled for one day but extended to two.

15 August 1984
(scorecard)

Warwickshire; 224 all out (59.3 overs)	v	Kent; 226/4 (58 overs)
Alvin Kallicharran 86; Terry Alderman 3/55 (11.3 overs)		Mark Benson 113; Anton Ferreira 2/34 (12 overs)

Kent won by 6 wickets
Edgbaston, Birmingham
Umpires: Barrie Leadbeater & Alan Whitehead
Player of the match: Mark Benson (Kent)

=== Final ===
1 September 1984
(scorecard)

Kent; 232/6 (60 overs)	v	Middlesex; 236/6 (60 overs)
Chris Cowdrey 58 (56); Wayne Daniel 2/41 (12 overs)		Clive Radley 67 (82); Kevin Jarvis 3/47 (12 overs)

Middlesex won by 4 wickets
Lord's, London
Umpires: Dickie Bird & Barrie Meyer
Player of the match: Clive Radley (Middlesex)
