= Justin Benson =

Justin Benson may refer to:

- Justin Benson (cricketer) (born 1967), former Irish cricketer
- Justin Benson (filmmaker) (born 1983), American filmmaker
