= 1894–95 Swindon Town F.C. season =

Swindon Town
1895–96 season
- Chairman: Committee
- Ground: County Ground
- Southern League Div 1: 9th
- FA Cup: 2nd Qualifying Round
- Top goalscorer: League: Robbie Reynolds (6); All: Robbie Reynolds (8)
- Highest home attendance: 6,000 vs. Millwall Athletic; 9 February 1895
- Lowest home attendance: 1,000 vs. New Brompton; 27 April 1895
Home colours

The 1894–95 season was Swindon Town's first season in the Southern League, the club's first season within a league structure. Swindon also competed in the FA Cup.

== League table ==
Pos	Team	Pld	W	D	L	GF	GA	GR	Pts	Qualification
5	Reading	16	6	2	8	33	38	0.868	14	
6	Chatham Town	16	4	5	7	22	25	0.880	13	
7	Royal Ordnance Factories	16	3	6	7	20	30	0.667	12	Relegation test matches
8	Clapton	16	5	1	10	22	38	0.579	11	Relegation test matches
9	Swindon Town	16	4	1	11	24	48	0.500	9	Relegation test matches

Source: The system of using goal average to separate two teams tied on points was used up until the 1976-77 season. The points system: 2 points for a win, 1 point for a draw and 0 points for losing.

== Results ==
=== Southern League Division One ===
22 September 1894 SLD1 1	Swindon Town	3–4	Reading	County Cricket Ground
	B. Andrews; R. Reynolds	Report	Moore; Fletcher; Kelsey; Stewart	Attendance: 3,000; Referee: N. Whittaker

29 September 1894 SLD1 2	Millwall Athletic	9–0	Swindon Town	Isle Of Dogs
	J. Wilson; W. Jones; J. Matthew; W. Richardson .' (o.g.)	Report		Attendance: 2,000; Referee: N. Whittaker

6 October 1894 SLD1 3	Ilford	1–0	Swindon Town	Lynn Road
	A. Linnard	Report		Attendance: 2,000; Referee: S.R. Carr

10 November 1894 SLD1 4	Reading	0–3	Swindon Town	Caversham Cricket Ground
		Report	W. Mantell; B. Andrews; C. Hamlin	Attendance: 2,000; Referee: R.H. Clark

22 December 1894 SLD1 5	Swindon Town	0–2	Chatham	County Cricket Ground
		Report	A. Humphreys; J. Guthrie	Referee: H. Walker

29 December 1894 SLD1 6	Swindon Town	3–1	Royal Ordnance Factories	County Cricket Ground
	R. Reynolds; B. Walman	Report		Referee: M. LeGrand

26 January 1895 SLD1 7	Clapton	3–0	Swindon Town	The Old Spotted Dog Ground
	F. Hughes; A. Milton; W. Bonning	Report		Referee: S.R. Carr

9 February 1895 SLD1 8	Swindon Town	1–5	Millwall Athletic	County Cricket Ground
	B. Shaw	Report	A. Wilson; J. Gettins; A. McKenzie; H. Robertson	Attendance: 6,000; Referee: F.J. Leese

23 February 1895 SLD1 9	Swindon Town	2–3	Southampton St. Mary's	County Cricket Ground
	B. Walman; B. Shaw	Report	H. Ward; C. Baker; G. Nineham	Referee: E.G. McDonald

2 March 1895 SLD1 10	Swindon Town	7–3	Ilford	County Cricket Ground
	R. Reynolds; W. Richardson .' (pen.); D. Jones; G. Kemp	Report	A. Porter; G. Moore; Watts	Referee: S.R. Carr

9 March 1895 SLD1 11	Luton Town	2–0	Swindon Town	Dallow Lane
	W. Gallacher; W. Prentice	Report		Attendance: 2,500; Referee: F.J. Leese

23 March 1895 SLD1 12	Royal Ordnance Factories	0–0	Swindon Town	Maze Hill
		Report		Referee: T.W. Saywell

30 March 1895 SLD1 13	Southampton St. Mary's	7–1	Swindon Town	Antelope Ground
	H. Ward; J. Angus; F. Hollands; J. Dorkin	Report	W. Jeffrey .' (o.g.)	Attendance: 4,000; Referee: A. Rostoe-Bourke

6 April 1895 SLD1 14	Swindon Town	0–3	Luton Town	County Cricket Ground
		Report	H. Galbraith; G. Ross .' (o.g.)	Referee: E.G. McDonald

13 April 1895 SLD1 15	Chatham	2–4	Swindon Town	The Lines
	A. Humphreys; H. Lawrence; J. Stanford	Report	A. Humphreys .' (o.g.); B. Andrews	Referee: E.G. McDonald

20 April 1895 SLD1 16	Swindon Town	2–1	Clapton	County Cricket Ground
	B. Andrews; J. Hayward	Report	E. Langhorne	Referee: H. Walker

=== Test Match ===
27 April 1895 Test Match	New Brompton	5–1	Swindon Town	Neutral Venue
	H. Buckland; A. Rule	Report	C. Lawless	Attendance: 1,000; Referee: N. Whittaker

=== FA Cup ===
13 October 1894 1QR (Division VII)	Swindon Town	4–2	St George	County Cricket Ground
	D. Jones; B. Andrews; R. Reynolds	Report	R. Lane; W. Britton	Referee: S.R. Carr

3 November 1894 2QR (Division VII)	Marlow	4–2	Swindon Town	Crown Meadow
	F. Jennings; C. Shaw	Report	W. Richardson; R. Reynolds	Referee: W.J. Wilson

== Appearances and goals ==
As of 13 August 2014

No.	Pos	Nat	Player	Total		Southern League		FA Cup		League Cup		Other	
No.	Pos	Nat	Player	Apps	Goals	Apps	Goals	Apps	Goals	Apps	Goals	Apps	Goals
	DF	(England) ENG	Tommy Allen	2	0	2	0	0	0	0	0	0	0
	MF	(England) ENG	Babe Andrews	17	5	15	4	2	1	0	0	0	0
	DF	(England) ENG	Arthur Dibsdale	9	0	7	0	2	0	0	0	0	0
	FW	(England) ENG	A. Dodd	1	0	1	0	0	0	0	0	0	0
	MF	(England) ENG	Charlie Done	7	0	7	0	0	0	0	0	0	0
	DF	(England) ENG	Bob Fulton	6	0	4	0	2	0	0	0	0	0
	FW	(England) ENG	Billy Griffin	1	0	1	0	0	0	0	0	0	0
	FW	(England) ENG	Cliff Hamlin	3	1	2	1	1	0	0	0	0	0
	MF	(England) ENG	Sid Hamlin	1	0	1	0	0	0	0	0	0	0
	FW	(England) ENG	Jimmy Hayward	15	1	14	1	1	0	0	0	0	0
	MF	(England) ENG	Alf Hobson	5	0	5	0	0	0	0	0	0	0
	FW	(England) ENG	Harry Jerrom	3	0	3	0	0	0	0	0	0	0
	MF	(England) ENG	Arthur Jones	0	0	0	0	0	0	0	0	0	0
	FW	(Wales) WAL	Dick Jones	15	5	13	3	2	2	0	0	0	0
	FW	(England) ENG	George Kemp	2	1	2	1	0	0	0	0	0	0
	MF	(England) ENG	Chris Lawless	7	1	7	1	0	0	0	0	0	0
	MF	(England) ENG	Will Mantell	3	1	2	1	1	0	0	0	0	0
	FW	(England) ENG	Percy Mills	4	0	3	0	0	0	1	0	0	0
	MF	(England) ENG	George Nash	1	0	1	0	0	0	0	0	0	0
	DF	(England) ENG	Will Noble	10	0	10	0	0	0	0	0	0	0
	FW	(England) ENG	Frank Paynter	1	0	1	0	0	0	0	0	0	0
	DF	(England) ENG	Will Pope	1	0	1	0	0	0	0	0	0	0
	FW	(England) ENG	Wally Price	2	0	1	0	1	0	0	0	0	0
	FW	(England) ENG	Robbie Reynolds	14	8	12	6	2	2	0	0	0	0
	DF	(Scotland) SCO	Wally Richardson	18	2	16	1	2	1	0	0	0	0
	FW	(England) ENG	Rogers	1	0	1	0	0	0	0	0	0	0
	MF	(England) ENG	Ginger Ross	7	0	7	0	0	0	0	0	0	0
	MF	(England) ENG	Charlie Shelwood	7	0	5	0	2	0	0	0	0	0
	FW	(England) ENG	Binky Shaw	7	2	7	2	0	0	0	0	0	0
	GK	(England) ENG	Harry Southall	5	0	3	0	2	0	0	0	0	0
	MF	(England) ENG	Harry Spackman	2	0	2	0	0	0	0	0	0	0
	DF	(England) ENG	Bert Vowles	1	0	1	0	0	0	0	0	0	0
	FW	(England) ENG	Bert Walman	14	2	12	2	2	0	0	0	0	0
	MF	(England) ENG	Harry Webb	1	0	1	0	0	0	0	0	0	0
	FW	(England) ENG	W. Webb	2	0	2	0	0	0	0	0	0	0
	GK	(England) ENG	Charlie Williams	14	0	14	0	0	0	0	0	0	0

== Matchday squads ==
=== Southern League Division One line-ups ===
Date	Opposition	V	Score	Goalkeeper	Outfield	Outfield	Outfield	Outfield	Outfield	Outfield	Outfield	Outfield	Outfield	Outfield
22/09/1894	Reading	H	3-4	Williams	Allen	Richardson	Spackman	Dibsdall	Selwood	Reynolds	D. Jones	Walman	Andrews	Mills
29/09/1894	Millwall Athletic	A	0-9	Southall	Allen	Richardson	Spackman	H. Webb	Selwood	Reynolds	D. Jones	Andrews	Walman	Mills
06/10/1894	Ilford	A	0-1	Southall	Pope	Richardson	Mantell	Dibsdall	Selwood	Price	D. Jones	Walman	Jerrom	Mills
10/11/1894	Reading	H	3-0	Southall	Fulton	Richardson	S. Hamlin	Mantell	Selwood	Reynolds	C. Hamlin	Andrews	Walman	Hayward
22/12/1894	Chatham	A	0-2	Williams	Fulton	Vowles	Done	Dibsdall	Selwood	Reynolds	D. Jones	Andrews	Walman	Hayward
29/12/1894	Royal Ordnance Factories	H	3-1	Williams	Noble	Richardson	Done	Andrews	Lawless	Reynolds	D. Jones	Dodd	Walman	Hayward
26/01/1895	Clapton	A	0-3	Williams	Noble	Richardson	Fulton	Andrews	Done	Reynolds	D. Jones	C. Hamlin	Walman	Hayward
09/02/1895	Millwall Athletic	H	1-5	Williams	Noble	Richardson	Done	A. Jones	Fulton	Shaw	D. Jones	Griffin	Walman	Hayward
23/02/1895	Southampton St. Mary's	H	2-3	Williams	Noble	Richardson	Hobson	Andrews	Lawless	Reynolds	Shaw	D. Jones	Walman	Hayward
02/03/1895	Ilford	H	7-3	Williams	Noble	Richardson	Hobson	Andrews	Ross	Reynolds	D. Jones	Shaw	Kemp	Hayward
09/03/1895	Luton Town	A	0-2	Williams	Noble	Richardson	Hobson	Andrews	Ross	Reynolds	D. Jones	Shaw	Kemp	Hayward
23/03/1895	Royal Ordnance Factories	A	0-0	Williams	Noble	Richardson	Hobson	Andrews	Ross	Reynolds	Rogers	Done	Shaw	Hayward
30/03/1895	Southampton St. Mary's	A	1-7	Williams	Noble	Richardson	Ross	Lawless	Hobson	Reynolds	Walman	Andrews	Shaw	Hayward
06/04/1895	Luton Town	H	0-3	Williams	Noble	Richardson	Lawless	Dibsdall	Ross	Jerrom	Walman	Andrews	D. Jones	Hayward
13/04/1895	Chatham	A	2-4	Williams	Dibsdall	Richardson	Nash	Lawless	Ross	W. Webb	Walman	Andrews	Jerrom	Hayward
20/04/1895	Clapton	H	2-1	Williams	Dibsdall	Richardson	Done	Lawless	Ross	Paynter	W. Webb	Andrews	D. Jones	Hayward

=== Test Match line-ups ===
Date	Opposition	V	Score	Goalkeeper	Outfield	Outfield	Outfield	Outfield	Outfield	Outfield	Outfield	Outfield	Outfield	Outfield
27/04/1895	New Brompton	N	1-5	Williams	Dibsdall	Richardson	Done	Lawless	Andrews	Shaw	Reynolds	Noble	D. Jones	Hayward

=== FA Cup line-ups ===
Date	Opposition	V	Score	Goalkeeper	Outfield	Outfield	Outfield	Outfield	Outfield	Outfield	Outfield	Outfield	Outfield	Outfield
13/10/1894	St. George	H	4-2	Southall	Fulton	Richardson	Mantell	Dibsdall	Selwood	Price	Reynolds	Andrews	D. Jones	Walman
03/11/1894	Marlow	A	2-4	Southall	Fulton	Richardson	C. Hamlin	Dibsdall	Selwood	Hayward	Reynolds	Andrews	D. Jones	Walman
