= Geoffrey Ford =

Geoffrey Ford may refer to:

- Geoffrey Ford (businessman), British businessman
- Geoffrey Ford (cricketer) (born 1961), former English cricketer
