= Malcolm Heath =

English cricketer (1934–2019)

Personal information
- Full name: Malcolm Brewster Heath
- Born: 9 March 1934; Ferndown, Dorset, England
- Died: 17 December 2019 (aged 85); Stroud, Gloucestershire, England
- Height: 6 ft 4 in (1.93 m)
- Batting: Left-handed
- Bowling: Right-arm fast-medium

Domestic team information
- Years: Team
- 1954–1962: Hampshire

Career statistics
Competition	First-class
Matches	143
Runs scored	569
Batting average	5.86
100s/50s	–/–
Top score	33
Balls bowled	28,998
Wickets	527
Bowling average	25.11
5 wickets in innings	18
10 wickets in match	5
Best bowling	8/43
Catches/stumpings	42/–
- Source: Cricinfo, 20 February 2010

Malcolm Brewster Heath (9 March 1934 — 17 December 2019) was an English cricketer who played first-class cricket for Hampshire from 1954 to 1962. Playing in over 140 first-class matches as a fast-medium bowler, Heath partnered opening bowler Derek Shackleton early in his career, before being utilised as a first-change bowler upon the arrival of Butch White. He was a member of the Hampshire team which won the County Championship for the first time in 1961. He took 527 wickets for Hampshire, before a hip-injury led to the end of his career in 1962. He later became a coach at St Paul's School, London.

== Cricket career ==
Heath was born in Ferndown in March 1934. Aged 15, he played for the Hampshire Second XI as a right-arm fast-medium bowler in 1949. As a young up-and-coming cricketer, he built up his strength by spending the winter months felling trees at Stuart Surridge's willow plantation, where he worked alongside Alan Moss. A period of National Service followed, before he eventually made his debut in first-class cricket for Hampshire against Leicestershire at Leicester in the 1954 County Championship, replacing the injured medium-pacer Victor Cannings. He took 17 wickets at an average of 15.41 from six matches in 1949; he took his maiden five wicket haul, with 5 for 41 against Yorkshire. He notably dismissed Len Hutton in both Yorkshire innings. The following season, he made a further eight appearances and took 33 wickets at an average of 20.45, with a further two five wicket hauls; Heath was one of just thirteen players used by Hampshire in 1955, as they finished third in the County Championship for the first time.

Heath made a further eleven first-class appearances in 1956, taking 36 wickets at an average of 26.05. It was in the 1957 season that he established himself in the Hampshire eleven, making 21 first-class appearances. He gained his county cap in that season, having taken 76 wickets at an average of 27.06; he claimed two five wicket hauls during the season, and took ten wickets in a match for the first time against Somerset at Bath, with match figures of 11 for 106. With Cannings career beginning to come to an end, Heath began to form a new ball partnership with Derek Shackleton. He had his most prolific season during the wet summer of 1958, when he took 126 wickets at an average of 16.42 from 28 appearances; he took a five wicket haul on ten occasions, in addition to taking ten wickets in a match thrice. He twice took 13 wickets in a match during the season, against Derbyshire at Burton and Sussex at Portsmouth. Hampshire, who had been top of the County Championship table in mid-August, ended up losing the match at Burton, despite Heath's 13 wickets. This defeat helped Surrey to surpass Hampshire in the latter matches of the Championship to claim their seventh successive title.

The summer of 1959 was described as having "endless sun", resulting in hard pitches. It was also the first season to feature covered wickets, which disadvantaged Heath. He also had to contend with the arrival of the faster and more aggressive Butch White, who replaced Heath as Shackleton's opening bowling partner; this resulted in Heath being utilised as a first-change bowler thereon. He took 71 wickets across the season from twenty matches, though his average of 38.84 was more than double that of the previous season. He played the same number of matches in 1960, taking 74 wickets at an average of 28.82. Heath's 54 wickets in the 1961 County Championship contributed towards securing Hampshire's first ever County Championship title. He struggled with a hip injury during the 1962 season, making just twelve appearances during the season and taking 31 wickets at an average of 35.22. On the day the Hampshire committee met to decide his future, Heath ran laps around the County Ground to prove to them his fitness. However, this was in vain as a decision was met to release him, alongside Bernard Harrison. A bowler who was able to achieve hostile pace and sharp lift, he took 527 wickets in 143 matches, at an average of 25.11; he claimed a five wicket haul on eighteen occasions, and took ten wickets in a match on five occasions. His career best bowling figures, 8 for 43, came against Sussex in 1958.

== Later life ==
Following his release, Heath was granted a testimonial in 1963. By 1964, he had relocated to Lincoln, where he played for Lindum Cricket Club, before joining Bourne later in 1964. Following the 1965 season, Heath joined Scarborough as their professional ahead of the 1966 season. He played for Scarborough in the Yorkshire League until 1974, retiring alongside teammate and former Yorkshire cricketer Bill Foord. Heath later as stood an umpire in three first-class matches during the 1984, in addition to standing in a single List A one-day match between Wiltshire and Leicestershire at Swindon in the 1984 NatWest Trophy. He spent ten years as cricket coach at St Paul's School in Barnes, London, before retiring in 2001, and had a coaching role at Lord's.

Following his retirement, he moved to Stroud with his wife, Margaret. Heath died in December 2019. He had a brother, Nigel, who was a prominent club cricketer in Hampshire.
