= Andrew Harwood =

Andrew Harwood may refer to:

- Andrew Harwood (television host) (1945–2008), Australian quiz show host, announcer and actor
- Andrew Harwood (cricketer) (born 1964), former English cricketer
- Andrew A. Harwood (1802–1884), admiral in the US Navy
