= Gaywood =

Gaywood may refer to:

- Gaywood, Norfolk, England
- Gaywood River, Norfolk, England
- Nick Gaywood (born 1963), English cricketer
- Richard Gaywood (fl. 1650–1680), English engraver
