= Keith Donohue (cricketer) =

English cricketer

Personal information
- Full name: Keith Donohue
- Born: 11 October 1963 (age 63); Chatham, Kent, England
- Batting: Right-handed
- Bowling: Right-arm medium-fast

Domestic team information
- Years: Team
- 1985–2000: Devon

Career statistics
Competition	List A
Matches	11
Runs scored	110
Batting average	15.71
100s/50s	–/–
Top score	31
Balls bowled	686
Wickets	13
Bowling average	41.84
5 wickets in innings	–
10 wickets in match	–
Best bowling	3/41
Catches/stumpings	2/–
- Source: Cricinfo, 10 February 2011

Keith Donohue (born 11 October 1963) is an English cricketer. Donohue is a right-handed batsman who bowled right-arm medium-fast. He was born in Chatham, Kent.

Donohue made his debut for Devon in the 1985 Minor Counties Championship against Cornwall, in doing so beginning a 15-year playing career with the county. From 1985 to 2000, he represented the county in 88 Championship matches, the last of which came against Cheshire. He made his MCCA Knockout Trophy debut for the county in 1986 against Cornwall. From 1986 to 2000, he represented the county in 34 Trophy matches, the last of which came against Cornwall. During this playing career with Devon, he won two Minor Counties Championships and three MCCA Knockout Trophy's. He played List A cricket for Devon at a time when they were permitted to take part in the domestic one-day competition, making his debut in that format in the 1986 NatWest Trophy against Nottinghamshire. From 1986 to 2000, he represented Devon in 11 List A matches, the last of which came in the 2000 NatWest Trophy against Staffordshire. In his 11 List A matches, he scored 110 runs at a batting average of 15.71, with a high score of 31. With the ball he took 13 wickets at a bowling average of 41.84, with best figures of 3/41 against Essex in the 1996 NatWest Trophy.

He currently plays club cricket for Plympton Cricket Club in the Devon Cricket League.
