= Ian Tansley =

English cricketer

Personal information
- Full name: Ian Joseph Tansley
- Born: 22 January 1962 (age 64); Stockport, Cheshire, England
- Batting: Right-handed

Domestic team information
- Years: Team
- 1983–1990: Cheshire

Career statistics
Competition	List A
Matches	3
Runs scored	35
Batting average	11.66
100s/50s	–/–
Top score	18
Balls bowled	–
Wickets	–
Bowling average	–
5 wickets in innings	–
10 wickets in match	–
Best bowling	–
Catches/stumpings	1/–
- Source: Cricinfo, 7 April 2011

Ian Joseph Tansley (born 22 January 1962) is a former English cricketer. Tansley was a right-handed batsman. He was born in Stockport, Cheshire.

Tansley made his debut for Cheshire in the 1983 Minor Counties Championship against Buckinghamshire. Tansley played Minor counties cricket for Cheshire from 1983 to 1990, including 47 Minor Counties Championship matches and 20 MCCA Knockout Trophy matches. In 1985, he made his List A debut against Yorkshire in the NatWest Trophy. He played two further List A matches for Cheshire, against Glamorgan in the 1987 NatWest Trophy and Northamptonshire, which Cheshire famously won by 1 wicket, in the 1988 NatWest Trophy. In his three List A matches, he scored 35 runs at a batting average of 11.66, with a high score of 18.

He also played Second XI cricket for the Warwickshire Second XI and the Derbyshire Second XI.
