= Paul Dutton (cricketer) =

English cricketer (born 1965)

Personal information
- Full name: Paul Nicholas Symon Dutton
- Born: 6 August 1965 (age 61); Manchester, Lancashire, England
- Batting: Right-handed
- Bowling: Right-arm medium

Domestic team information
- Years: Team
- 1986–1996: Northumberland

Career statistics
| Competition | List A |
|---|---|
| Matches | 4 |
| Runs scored | 49 |
| Batting average | 16.33 |
| 100s/50s | –/– |
| Top score | 26* |
| Balls bowled | 36 |
| Wickets | – |
| Bowling average | – |
| 5 wickets in innings | – |
| 10 wickets in match | – |
| Best bowling | – |
| Catches/stumpings | 1/– |
- Source: Cricinfo, 1 July 2011

Paul Nicholas Symon Dutton (born 6 August 1965) is a former English cricketer. Dutton was a right-handed batsman who bowled right-arm medium pace. He was born in Manchester, Lancashire.

Dutton made his debut for Northumberland in the 1986 Minor Counties Championship against Lincolnshire. Dutton played Minor counties cricket for Northumberland from 1986 to 1996, which included 66 Minor Counties Championship matches and 16 MCCA Knockout Trophy matches. He made his List A debut against Essex in the 1987 NatWest Trophy. He made 3 further List A matches for the county, the last coming against Nottinghamshire in the 1994 NatWest Trophy. In his 4 List A matches, he scored 49 runs at an average of 16.33, with a high score of 26 not out.
