= David Cartledge =

English cricketer

Personal information
- Full name: David Cartledge
- Born: 11 July 1956 (age 70); Stoke-on-Trent, Staffordshire, England
- Batting: Right-handed
- Bowling: Right-arm off break

Domestic team information
- Years: Team
- 1979–1998: Staffordshire

Career statistics
Competition	List A
Matches	9
Runs scored	124
Batting average	13.77
100s/50s	–/–
Top score	26
Balls bowled	114
Wickets	3
Bowling average	29.00
5 wickets in innings	–
10 wickets in match	–
Best bowling	2/21
Catches/stumpings	2/–
- Source: Cricinfo, 17 June 2011

David Cartledge (born 11 July 1956) is a former English cricketer. Cartledge was a right-handed batsman who bowled right-arm off break. He was born in Stoke-on-Trent, Staffordshire.

Cartledge made his debut for Staffordshire in the 1979 Minor Counties Championship against Lincolnshire. Cartledge played Minor counties cricket for Staffordshire from 1979 to 1998, which included 114 Minor Counties Championship matches and 20 MCCA Knockout Trophy matches. In 1984, he made his List A debut against Gloucestershire in the NatWest Trophy. He made 8 further appearances in List A cricket, the last coming against Kent in the 1995 NatWest Trophy. In his 9 List A matches, he scored 124 runs at an average of 13.77, with a high score of 26. With the ball, he took 3 wickets at a bowling average of 29.00, with best figures of 2/21.
