= Peter Duthie =

Scottish cricketer

Personal information
- Full name: Peter Gordon Duthie
- Born: 16 April 1959 (age 67); Greenock, Renfrewshire, Scotland
- Batting: Right-handed
- Bowling: Right-arm medium

Domestic team information
- Years: Team
- 1984–1994: Scotland

Career statistics
Competition	First-class	List A
Matches	5	29
Runs scored	122	163
Batting average	24.40	10.18
100s/50s	–/1	–/–
Top score	54*	33
Balls bowled	1,032	1,643
Wickets	11	27
Bowling average	40.72	41.77
5 wickets in innings	–	–
10 wickets in match	–	–
Best bowling	3/99	3/31
Catches/stumpings	5/–	4/–
- Source: Cricinfo, 19 June 2022

Peter Gordon Duthie (born 16 April 1959) is a Scottish chief executive and former cricketer.

Duthie was born at Greenock in April 1959. A club cricketer for Greenock Cricket Club, Duthie made his debut for Scotland in a List A one-day match against Essex at Chelmsford in the 1984 NatWest Trophy. He was a regular in the Scottish eleven in one-day cricket from 1984 to 1994, making 29 appearances across the Benson & Hedges Cup and the NatWest Trophy. In his 29 one-day matches, he scored 163 runs with a highest score of 33. With his right-arm medium pace bowling, he took 27 wickets at an average of 41.77, with best figures of 3 for 31. In addition to playing one-day cricket for Scotland, Duthie also made five appearances in first-class cricket against Ireland from 1984 to 1991, scoring 122 runs at an average of 24.40, recording one half century, a score of 54 not out. With the ball, he took 11 wickets at an average of 40.72, with best figures of 3 for 99.

Duthie began employment with the Scottish Exhibition Centre (SEC) in 1984 and became a member of its senior management team in 1991. He was appointed chief executive of the SEC in 2014. He resides in Kilmacolm and is married with two daughters.
