= David Hale (English cricketer) =

English cricketer (born 1966)

Personal information
- Full name: David Andrew Hale
- Born: 20 March 1966 (age 60); Oxford, Oxfordshire, England
- Batting: Right-handed
- Bowling: Right-arm fast-medium

Domestic team information
- Years: Team
- 1989: Minor Counties
- 1984–1991: Oxfordshire

Career statistics
Competition	List A
Matches	6
Runs scored	58
Batting average	11.60
100s/50s	–/–
Top score	33
Balls bowled	266
Wickets	5
Bowling average	41.20
5 wickets in innings	–
10 wickets in match	–
Best bowling	2/35
Catches/stumpings	1/–
- Source: Cricinfo, 20 May 2011

David Andrew Hale (born 20 March 1966) is a former English cricketer. Hale was a right-handed batsman who bowled right-arm fast-medium. He was born in Oxford, Oxfordshire.

Hale made his debut for Oxfordshire in the 1984 Minor Counties Championship against Berkshire. Hale played Minor counties cricket for Oxfordshire from 1984 to 1991, which included 31 Minor Counties Championship matches and 10 MCCA Knockout Trophy matches. He made his List A debut against Leicestershire in the 1987 NatWest Trophy. He played 3 further List A matches for Oxfordshire, the last coming against Surrey in the 1991 NatWest Trophy. In his 6 List A matches, he scored 50 runs at a batting average of 10.00, with a high score of 30.

Playing for Oxfordshire entitled Hale to represent the Minor Counties cricket team. He played 2 List A matches for the team in the 1989 Benson & Hedges Cup against Nottinghamshire and Derbyshire. In total, he made 6 List A appearances. In these he scored 58 runs at a batting average of 11.60, with a high score of 33. With the ball, he took 5 wickets at a bowling average of 41.20, with best figures of 2/35.

He had previously played Second XI cricket for the Hampshire Second XI in 1983 and 1984.
