= Steve Monkhouse =

English cricketer (born 1962)

Personal information
- Full name: Steven Monkhouse
- Born: 24 November 1962 (age 63); Bury, Lancashire, England
- Batting: Right-handed
- Bowling: Left-arm fast-medium

Domestic team information
- Years: Team
- 1989: Staffordshire
- 1987–1988: Glamorgan
- 1985–1986: Warwickshire

Career statistics
Competition	First-class	List A
Matches	11	5
Runs scored	30	11
Batting average	4.28	5.50
100s/50s	–/–	–/–
Top score	15	11
Balls bowled	1,056	240
Wickets	18	8
Bowling average	32.00	19.87
5 wickets in innings	–	1
10 wickets in match	–	–
Best bowling	3/37	5.32
Catches/stumpings	2/–	4/–
- Source: Cricinfo, 7 July 2011

Steven Monkhouse (born 24 November 1962) is a former English cricketer. Monkhouse was a right-handed batsman who bowled left-arm fast-medium. He was born in Bury, Lancashire.

Monkhouse made his debut in county cricket for Warwickshire in a first-class match against Surrey in the County Championship. He made a further first-class appearance the following season against Lancashire in the 1986 County Championship. He took 2 wickets in his 2 matches, at 47.50 a piece. He joined Glamorgan in 1987, making his first-class debut for the county against Oxford University. He made 7 further first-class appearances for Glamorgan, the last of which came against Yorkshire in the 1988 County Championship. In his 8 first-class matches, he took 16 wickets at a respectable average of 30.06, with best figures of 3/37. It was for Glamorgan that he made his List A debut in the 1987 Refuge Assurance League against Northamptonshire. He made 3 further List A appearances for Glamorgan, all coming in 1987, with his final appearance coming against Hampshire. In his 4 limited-overs appearances for the county, he took 8 wickets at an average of 11.62, with best figures of 5/32. His best bowling figures came against Cheshire in the 1987 NatWest Trophy.

Leaving Glamorgan at the end of the 1988 season, Monkhouse later made a single List A appearance for Staffordshire against Glamorgan in the 1989 NatWest Trophy. In this match, he was dismissed for 11 runs by Michael Cann, while with the ball he bowled 12 wicket-less overs for the cost of 66 runs. He never appeared in Minor counties cricket for Staffordshire.
