= Thomas Jameson (cricketer, born 1946) =

English cricketer (born 1946)

Personal information
- Full name: Thomas Edward Neville Jameson
- Born: 23 July 1946 (age 80); Bombay, Bombay Presidency, British India
- Batting: Left-handed
- Bowling: Right-arm medium
- Relatives: John Jameson (brother)

Domestic team information
- Years: Team
- 1970: Warwickshire
- 1970: Cambridge University

Career statistics
Competition	First-class
Matches	10
Runs scored	181
Batting average	12.06
100s/50s	0/0
Top score	32
Balls bowled	1,291
Wickets	10
Bowling average	53.10
5 wickets in innings	0
10 wickets in match	0
Best bowling	2/21
Catches/stumpings	12/–
- Source: Cricinfo, 14 July 2012

Thomas Edward Neville Jameson (born 23 July 1946) is an English former cricketer. Jameson was a left-handed batsman who bowled right-arm medium pace.

Jameson was born in Bombay and educated at Taunton School. He studied initially at Durham University (1966–1969). Later enrolling at the University of Cambridge, where he gained a cricketing Blue, Jameson made his first-class debut for Cambridge University against Warwickshire at Fenner's in 1970.

He made eight further first-class appearances for the university in that season, the last of which came against Oxford University in The University Match at Lord's. In his nine appearances for the university, he scored 118 runs at an average of 9.07, with a high score of 31 not out. With the ball, he took 10 wickets at a bowling average of 45.60, with best figures of 2/21. Jameson also made a single first-class appearance in 1970 for Warwickshire against Cambridge University at Edgbaston, making scores of 31 and 32 in a drawn match.

His brother, John, played Test cricket for England.
