= John O'Brien (cricketer, born 1961) =

English cricketer (born 1961)

Personal information
- Full name: John Francis Martin O'Brien
- Born: 29 May 1961 (age 65); Birkenhead, Cheshire, England
- Batting: Right-handed
- Bowling: Slow left-arm orthodox

Domestic team information
- Years: Team
- 1986–1995: Cheshire

Career statistics
Competition	List A
Matches	8
Runs scored	61
Batting average	30.50
100s/50s	–/–
Top score	14*
Balls bowled	432
Wickets	11
Bowling average	26.36
5 wickets in innings	–
10 wickets in match	–
Best bowling	4/40
Catches/stumpings	5/–
- Source: Cricinfo, 5 April 2011

John Francis Martin O'Brien (born 29 May 1961) is a former English cricketer. O'Brien was a right-handed batsman who bowled slow left-arm orthodox. He was born in Birkenhead, Cheshire.

O'Brien made his debut for Cheshire in the 1986 Minor Counties Championship against Dorset. O'Brien played Minor counties cricket for Cheshire from 1986 to 1995, including 71 Minor Counties Championship matches and 18 MCCA Knockout Trophy matches. In 1987, he made his List A debut against Glamorgan in the NatWest Trophy. He played seven further List A matches for Cheshire, the last of which came against Essex in the 1995 NatWest Trophy. In his eight List A matches, he scored 61 runs, with a high score of 14*. With the ball he took 11 wickets at a bowling average of 26.36. His best figures of 4/40 came against Derbyshire in the 1988 NatWest Trophy.

He also played Second XI cricket for the Warwickshire Second XI in 1988.
