= Paul New =

English cricketer (born 1953)

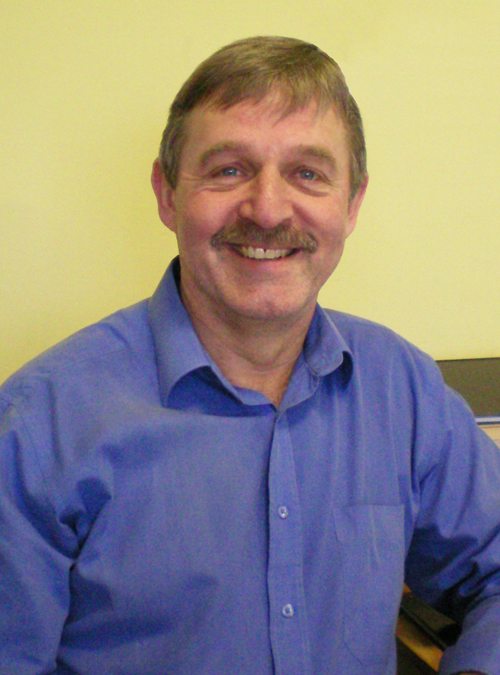

Personal information
- Full name: Paul Michael New
- Born: 30 September 1953 (age 73); Wokingham, Berkshire, England
- Batting: Left-handed
- Bowling: Right-arm medium-fast

Domestic team information
- Years: Team
- 1974-1987: Berkshire

Career statistics
Competition	LA
Matches	4
Runs scored	25
Batting average	6.25
100s/50s	–/–
Top score	13
Balls bowled	280
Wickets	6
Bowling average	25.33
5 wickets in innings	–
10 wickets in match	–
Best bowling	3/58
Catches/stumpings	1/–
- Source: Cricinfo, 20 September 2010

Paul Michael New (born 30 September 1953) is a former English cricketer. New was a right-handed batsman who bowled right-arm medium-fast. He was born at Wokingham, Berkshire.

New made his Minor Counties Championship debut for Berkshire in 1974 against Wiltshire. From 1974 to 1987, he represented the county in 47 Minor Counties Championship matches, the last of which came in the 1987 Championship when Berkshire played Cheshire. New also played in the MCCA Knockout Trophy for Berkshire. His debut in that competition came in 1983 when Berkshire played Norfolk. From 1983 to 1987, he represented the county in 9 Trophy matches, the last of which came when Berkshire played Buckinghamshire in the 1987 MCCA Knockout Trophy.

Additionally, he also played List-A matches for Berkshire. His List-A debut for the county came against Yorkshire in the 1983 NatWest Trophy. From 1983 to 1986, he represented the county in 4 List-A matches, with his final List-A match coming in the 1986 NatWest Trophy when Berkshire played Gloucestershire at Courages Cricket Ground in Reading. In his 4 matches, he took 6 wickets at a bowling average of 25.33, with best figures of 3/58.
