= Grahame Clarke =

English cricketer

Personal information
- Full name: Grahame Jeffrey Clarke
- Born: 1 August 1965 (age 61); Lancaster, Lancashire, England
- Batting: Right-handed

Domestic team information
- Years: Team
- 1985–1997: Cumberland

Career statistics
Competition	List A
Matches	7
Runs scored	132
Batting average	18.85
100s/50s	–/1
Top score	61
Balls bowled	–
Wickets	–
Bowling average	–
5 wickets in innings	–
10 wickets in match	–
Best bowling	–
Catches/stumpings	1/–
- Source: Cricinfo, 31 March 2011

Grahame Jeffrey Clarke (born 1 August 1965) is a former English cricketer. Clarke was a right-handed batsman. He was born in Lancaster, Lancashire.

Clarke made his debut for Cumberland in the 1985 Minor Counties Championship against Bedfordshire. Clarke played Minor counties cricket for Cumberland from 1985 to 1998, including 64 Minor Counties Championship matches and 13 MCCA Knockout Trophy matches. In 1985, he made his List A debut against Middlesex in the NatWest Trophy. He played six further List A matches for Cumberland, the last of which came against Northamptonshire in the 1997 NatWest Trophy. In his seven List A matches, he scored 132 runs at a batting average of 18.85, with a high score of 61. His highest score came against Sussex in the 1987 NatWest Trophy.

He also played Second XI cricket for the Lancashire Second XI.
