= Andrew Harwood (cricketer) =

English cricketer

Personal information
- Full name: Andrew Robert Harwood
- Born: 6 January 1964 (age 62); Aylesbury, Buckinghamshire, England
- Batting: Left-handed
- Bowling: Right-arm medium

Domestic team information
- Years: Team
- 1983–1995: Buckinghamshire

Career statistics
Competition	List A
Matches	7
Runs scored	143
Batting average	20.42
100s/50s	–/1
Top score	57
Balls bowled	–
Wickets	–
Bowling average	–
5 wickets in innings	–
10 wickets in match	–
Best bowling	–
Catches/stumpings	2/–
- Source: Cricinfo, 5 May 2011

Andrew Robert Harwood (born 6 January 1964) is a former English cricketer. Harwood was a left-handed batsman who bowled right-arm medium pace. He was born in Aylesbury, Buckinghamshire.

Harwood made his debut for Buckinghamshire in the 1983 Minor Counties Championship against the Somerset Second XI. Harwood played Minor counties cricket for Buckinghamshire from 1983 to 1995, which included 66 Minor Counties Championship matches and 27 MCCA Knockout Trophy matches. In 1984, he made his List A debut against Lancashire in the NatWest Trophy. He played 6 further List A matches for Buckinghamshire, the last of which came against Sussex in the 1992 NatWest Trophy. In his 7 List A matches, he scored 143 runs at a batting average of 20.42, with a single half century score of 57. This came against Warwickshire in the 1987 NatWest Trophy, with his innings being ended by Norman Gifford.

He has also played Second XI cricket for the Middlesex Second XI, the Gloucestershire Second XI and the Northamptonshire Second XI.
