= Steven Sharp =

English cricketer

Personal information
- Full name: Steven Sharp
- Born: 22 September 1962 (age 64); Barrow-in-Furness, Lancashire, England
- Batting: Right-handed

Domestic team information
- Years: Team
- 1990: Minor Counties
- 1982–2002: Cumberland

Career statistics
Competition	List A
Matches	8
Runs scored	212
Batting average	35.33
100s/50s	0/1
Top score	75
Balls bowled	18
Wickets	0
Bowling average	–
5 wickets in innings	–
10 wickets in match	–
Best bowling	–
Catches/stumpings	1/–
- Source: Cricinfo, 1 April 2011

Steven Sharp (born 22 September 1962) is a former English cricketer. Sharp was a right-handed batsman. He was born in Barrow-in-Furness, Lancashire.

Sharp made his debut for Cumberland in the 1982 Minor Counties Championship against Durham. Sharp played Minor counties cricket for Cumberland from 1982 to 2002, including 65 Minor Counties Championship matches and 19 MCCA Knockout Trophy matches. In 1986, he made his List A debut against Lancashire in the NatWest Trophy. He played five further List A matches for Cumberland, the last of which came against Leicestershire in the 1994 NatWest Trophy. He also played two List A matches for the Minor Counties cricket team in the 1990 Benson and Hedges Cup against Sussex and Derbyshire. In his eight List A matches, he scored 212 runs at a batting average of 35.33, with a high score of 75. His only half century for Cumberland came against Essex in the 1992 NatWest Trophy. He also played Second XI cricket for the Lancashire Second XI.

Sharp is chairman of Cumberland County Cricket Club and works as a waste manager at Sellafield.
