= Stephen Edwards (cricketer) =

English cricketer (born 1951)

Personal information
- Full name: Stephen James Edwards
- Born: 23 June 1951 (age 75); Highgate, Middlesex, England
- Batting: Right-handed
- Bowling: Slow left-arm orthodox Left arm medium

Domestic team information
- Years: Team
- 1988: Minor Counties
- 1985–1992: Buckinghamshire

Career statistics
Competition	List A
Matches	4
Runs scored	29
Batting average	29.00
100s/50s	–/–
Top score	25*
Balls bowled	240
Wickets	3
Bowling average	41.33
5 wickets in innings	–
10 wickets in match	–
Best bowling	2/14
Catches/stumpings	1/–
- Source: Cricinfo, 4 May 2011

Stephen James Edwards (born 23 June 1951) is a former English cricketer. Edwards was a right-handed batsman who bowled both slow left-arm orthodox and left-arm medium pace. He was born in Highgate, Middlesex.

Edwards made his debut for Buckinghamshire in the 1985 Minor Counties Championship against the Somerset Second XI. Edwards played Minor counties cricket for Buckinghamshire from 1985 to 1992, which included 33 Minor Counties Championship matches and 6 MCCA Knockout Trophy matches. In 1987, he made his List A debut against Somerset in the NatWest Trophy. He played 2 further List A matches for Buckinghamshire, the last coming against Sussex in the 1992 NatWest Trophy. He also played a single List A match for the combined Minor Counties cricket team in the 1988 Benson & Hedges Cup against Nottinghamshire. In total, Edwards played 4 List A matches, scoring 29 runs and taking 3 wickets at a bowling average of 41.33, with best figures of 2/14.

He also played Second XI cricket for the Essex Second XI in 1976.
