= David Lupton =

English cricketer (1948–2023)

Personal information
- Full name: David John Lupton
- Born: 7 August 1948; Millom, Cumberland, England
- Died: 14 August 2023 (aged 75); Millom, Cumberland, England
- Batting: Right-handed
- Bowling: Right-arm fast-medium

Domestic team information
- Years: Team
- 1975–1986: Cumberland

Career statistics
Competition	List A
Matches	1
Runs scored	0
Batting average	0.00
100s/50s	–/–
Top score	0
Balls bowled	36
Wickets	1
Bowling average	27.00
5 wickets in innings	–
10 wickets in match	–
Best bowling	1/27
Catches/stumpings	–/–
- Source: Cricinfo, 27 August 2023

David John Lupton (7 August 1948 – 14 August 2023) was an English cricketer.

Lupton was born at Millom in August 1948. He made his debut in minor counties cricket for Cumberland against the Lancashire Second XI in the 1975 Minor Counties Championship. He played in the Minor Counties Championship for Cumberland until 1985, making 48 appearances. Playing as a right-arm fast-medium bowler, he took 146 wickets at an average of 24.22; he took a five wicket haul on six occasions and took ten wickets in a match on three occasions. In 1984, he became the first Cumberland bowler to take a hat-trick in the Minor Counties Championship, which he achieved against Durham at Hartlepool. He also made four one-day appearances in the MCCA Knockout Trophy between 1983 and 1986. Lupton made a single appearance in List A one-day cricket for Cumberland against Derbyshire at Kendal in the 1984 NatWest Trophy. He was dismissed for a duck by Kim Barnett in Cumberland's innings, but did himself dismiss Barnett in Derbyshire's innings, finishing with figures of 1 for 27 from six overs.

In club cricket, he played for Millom Cricket Club from 1969 to 1997 in the North Lancashire League (truncated by three seasons as a professional for Kendal Cricket Club from 1978 to 1980). He captained Millom in 1987 and 1988. Outside of cricket, he worked at Sellafield. Lupton died at Millom on 14 August 2023, at the age of 75. He was survived by his wife, Susan.
