= Brendan McArdle =

Australian cricketer

Personal information
- Full name: Brendan Joseph McArdle
- Born: 2 March 1952 (age 74); Melbourne, Victoria, Australia
- Batting: Right-handed
- Bowling: Right-arm medium-fast
- Role: Batsman

Domestic team information
- Years: Team
- 1976/77–1978/79: Victoria
- 1984; 1989: Staffordshire

Career statistics
Competition	First-class	List A
Matches	11	2
Runs scored	600	38
Batting average	30.81	19.00
100s/50s	0/3	0/0
Top score	78	37
Balls bowled	1,172	60
Wickets	13	1
Bowling average	43.00	63.00
5 wickets in innings	0	0
10 wickets in match	0	0
Best bowling	3/40	1/40
Catches/stumpings	3/–	0/–
- Source: Cricinfo, 12 September 2020

Brendan Joseph McArdle (born 2 March 1952) is a former Australia first-class cricketer. McArdle played as a right-handed batsman who bowled right-arm medium-fast. He was born in Melbourne, Victoria.

McArdle made his first-class cricket debut for Victoria against South Australia in the 1976–77 Sheffield Shield. He made 10 further first-class appearances for Victoria, the last coming against Tasmania in the 1978–79 Sheffield Shield. An all-rounder, McArdle scored 339 runs at an average of 30.81. He made three half centuries, with a high score of 78. This came against South Australia on debut. With the ball, McArdle took 13 wickets at a bowling average of 43.00, with best figures of 3/40. An infrequent player for Victoria, the 1978–79 season was his last for the state.

In the early 1980s, McArdle played for a number of teams in the Lancashire League as a professional. He also played for Staffordshire County Cricket Club, making his debut against Hertfordshire in the 1984 Minor Counties Championship. He made his List A cricket debut for the county against Gloucestershire, scoring 37 runs. McArdle continued to feature in the Lancashire League, returning to Staffordshire to play his second and final List A match against Glamorgan in the 1989 NatWest Trophy.
