= Tony Pigott =

English cricketer (1958–2026)

Personal information
- Full name: Anthony Charles Shackleton Pigott
- Born: 4 June 1958; Fulham, London, England
- Died: 1 February 2026 (aged 67); Royal Tunbridge Wells, Kent, England
- Batting: Right-handed
- Bowling: Right-arm fast-medium

International information
- National side: England
- Only Test (cap 504): 3 February 1984 v New Zealand

Career statistics
Competition	Test	First-class
Matches	1	260
Runs scored	12	4,841
Batting average	12.00	19.28
100s/50s	0/0	1/20
Top score	8*	104*
Balls bowled	102	38,053
Wickets	2	672
Bowling average	37.50	30.99
5 wickets in innings	0	26
10 wickets in match	0	2
Best bowling	2/75	7/74
Catches/stumpings	0/–	121/–
- Source: CricInfo, 7 November 2022

Anthony Charles Shackleton Pigott (4 June 1958 – 1 February 2026) was an English cricketer, who played in one Test for England in 1984, when he was called up as an emergency replacement in New Zealand. He was playing provincial cricket there at the time of an injury crisis, although according to Martin Williamson of Cricinfo, Pigott "would not have been high in the selectors' minds".

At that time, Pigott was a fast bowler of some promise, playing in Wellington, New Zealand, for experience during the traditional winter's break from the domestic game in his homeland. Pigott was due to get married, and the surprise call-up meant he had to postpone his wedding to represent his country. Pigott got off to a good start, taking a New Zealand wicket with only his seventh delivery. However, with a depleted side, England were twice bowled out for less than 100, and lost the match within twelve hours of actual playing time.

== Biography ==
Pigott was born on 4 June 1958. He played first-class cricket for Sussex and later for Surrey. His initial three first-class wickets came in his third first-class game, in the form of a hat-trick for Sussex against Surrey. However, his career became blighted by back injuries and petered out altogether after his move to play for Surrey. In total, he took 672 first-class wickets at marginally under 31 each. His only first-class century was 104 not out against Warwickshire in 1986.

After turning to coaching Surrey's second XI, he returned as Chief Executive at Sussex following an acrimonious coup. "I'm a Sussex boy and it horrifies me to see the club in such a state with no one prepared to take the blame for it," added Pigott. He became unhappy with the vagaries of his responsibilities, and resigned for personal reasons in 1999.

Pigott died from a heart attack on 1 February 2026, aged 67.

== See also ==
- One-Test wonder
