= Robert Hailey =

English cricketer

Personal information
- Full name: Robert John Hailey
- Born: 25 July 1951 (age 75); Gosforth, Northumberland, England
- Batting: Right-handed
- Bowling: Slow left-arm orthodox

Domestic team information
- Years: Team
- 1978–1988: Hertfordshire
- 1982: Minor Counties

Career statistics
| Competition | List A |
|---|---|
| Matches | 7 |
| Runs scored | 11 |
| Batting average | 11.00 |
| 100s/50s | 0/0 |
| Top score | 7* |
| Balls bowled | 384 |
| Wickets | 6 |
| Bowling average | 42.83 |
| 5 wickets in innings | 0 |
| 10 wickets in match | 0 |
| Best bowling | 4/32 |
| Catches/stumpings | 2/– |
- Source: Cricinfo, 6 June 2011

Robert John Hailey (born 25 July 1951) is a former English cricketer. Hailey was a right-handed batsman who bowled slow left-arm orthodox. He was born in Gosforth, Northumberland.

Hailey made his debut for Hertfordshire in the 1978 Minor Counties Championship against Norfolk. Hailey played Minor counties cricket for Hertfordshire from 1978 to 1988, which included 67 Minor Counties Championship matches and 12 MCCA Knockout Trophy matches. He made his List A debut for the Minor Counties cricket team against Derbyshire in the 1982 Benson & Hedges Cup, in what was his only appearance for the team. His debut in List A cricket for Hertfordshire came against Hampshire in the 1983 NatWest Trophy. He made 5 further List A appearances for the county, the last coming against Middlesex in the 1988 NatWest Trophy. In his 6 List A matches for the county, he took 6 wickets at an average of 35.33, with best figures of 4/32.
