= Adrian Wykes =

English cricketer

Adrian Paul Acheson 'Percy' Wykes (born 7 February 1958) is an English cricketer. He is a right-handed batsman and right-arm medium-pace bowler who played for Cambridgeshire and Luxembourg. He was born in Westminster. He is a Level 2 E.C.B. coach and an M.C.C. life-member.

Wykes is the only bowler to have taken the wickets of both Steve Waugh (Cambridge University Crusaders versus Essex IIs, second innings, King's and Selwyn, 1985) and Mike Atherton (Cambridgeshire versus Cambridge University, Fenner's, 1989) in Cambridge. He made his Minor Counties Championship debut in 1987, and made three List A appearances in the NatWest Trophy between 1987 and 1989. Wykes took five wickets with the ball in his one-day career (Morris, Roberts, Din, Humpage, Smith), from 25.1 overs of bowling at an average of 15.60. He caught one catch (Moles), and made one run-out (Lloyd). Curtis and Hick, however, saw him off without trouble in 1989. In just a single appearance at the crease, Wykes scored 0 not out while testing out the authenticity of Michael Holding's nickname 'Whispering Death' by closing his eyes at the non-striker's end.

As Percy Pavilion he wrote songs and poems about cricket between 1982 and 1998, releasing records, a c.d., and a cassette. His anti-apartheid songs were "Dolly" Mixture (about Basil D’Oliveira) and Mercenaries Cricket Club (about the rebel tours of South Africa).

In the early 1990s, Adrian was associated with Manningtree's greatest band until Anna's Bones , The Perfect Gift. The group made a tape in Adrian's studio, containing a mixing desk bought from The Shadows. Because the band were poor, Adrian let them do the tape for free, as long as they dug the footings for part of the building. The tape was a great success, and was nearly given to the then manager of Blur, but Adrian forgot to bring the tape to the gig. This later was recognised as an act of mercy.

He became captain of the Optimists Cricket Club and Luxembourg (1999–2001) and then President of the Luxembourg Cricket Federation, being heavily involved in developing a ground at Évrange and several net facilities at various local sites. He helped run the Luxembourg juniors when his twin daughters started to play and his daughter Lydie Wykes-Templeman has now progressed to play T20 internationals for France.

He now teaches Latin, Geography, History, Sociology, Ethics, and Economics at the Luxembourg II European School. He has written a book about cricket, Economics, Cambridge, and Keynes whose central theme is the Pax Schuman in Europe.
