= Simon Porter (cricketer) =

English cricketer (1950–2017)

Personal information
- Full name: Simon Robert Porter
- Born: 9 August 1950; Cowley, Oxfordshire, England
- Died: 9 February 2017 (aged 66)
- Batting: Right-handed
- Bowling: Right-arm off break

Domestic team information
- Years: Team
- 1973: Oxford University
- 1971–1988: Oxfordshire

Career statistics
Competition	First-class	List A
Matches	7	11
Runs scored	76	71
Batting average	7.60	8.87
100s/50s	–/–	–/–
Top score	20	44
Balls bowled	1,370	612
Wickets	18	10
Bowling average	33.33	49.90
5 wickets in innings	–	–
10 wickets in match	–	–
Best bowling	4/26	3/58
Catches/stumpings	2/–	2/–
- Source: Cricinfo, 24 May 2011

Simon Robert Porter (9 August 1950 – 9 February 2017) was an English cricketer. Porter was a right-handed batsman who bowled right-arm off break. He was born in Cowley, Oxfordshire.

== Oxford University ==
Simon Porter attended Peers School, Littlemore, before going up to St Edmund Hall, Oxford. He made his first-class debut for Oxford University against Worcestershire in 1973. He played 6 further first-class matches for the university, the last coming against Cambridge University in the same year. In his 7 first-class matches, he scored 76 runs at a batting average of 7.60, with a high score of 20. With the ball, he took 18 wickets at a bowling average of 33.33, with best figures of 4/26.

It was Oxford University that he made his debut in List A cricket for, against Warwickshire in the 1973 Benson & Hedges Cup. He made 2 further appearances for the university in that season's competition, against Northamptonshire and Worcestershire.

== Oxfordshire ==
Porter made his debut for Oxfordshire before playing for Oxford University, first appearing in the 1971 Minor Counties Championship against Wiltshire. Porter played Minor counties cricket for Oxfordshire from 1971 to 1988 which included 118 Minor Counties Championship matches and 9 MCCA Knockout Trophy matches. He played his first List A match for Oxfordshire against Cornwall in the 1975 Gillette Cup. He played 7 further List A matches for Oxfordshire, the last of which came against Leicestershire in the 1987 NatWest Trophy. In his 8 List A matches for the county, he scored 55 runs at an average of 9.16, with a high score of 44. He took 9 wickets at a bowling average of 45.33, with best figures of 3/58.
