= Philip Stephens (cricketer) =

English cricketer

Philip John Stephens (born 7 May 1960) is a former English cricketer. He was a right-handed batsman who played for Cornwall. He was born in Hertford.

Stephens, who played Minor Counties cricket for Cornwall between 1983 and 1990, made his only List A appearance in June 1986, against Derbyshire. Batting at number three, he top-scored for Cornwall with 54, but they lost by 204 runs.
