= Alan Stevenson (cricketer) =

Scottish cricketer

Personal information
- Full name: Alan William John Stevenson
- Born: 2 October 1962 (age 64); Coatbridge, Lanarkshire, Scotland
- Batting: Right-handed
- Bowling: Right-arm off break

Domestic team information
- Years: Team
- 1985–1987: Scotland

Career statistics
Competition	First-class	List A
Matches	3	7
Runs scored	9	7
Batting average	9.00	1.40
100s/50s	–/–	–/–
Top score	9	5
Balls bowled	570	292
Wickets	11	3
Bowling average	20.45	65.66
5 wickets in innings	–	–
10 wickets in match	–	–
Best bowling	4/38	1/20
Catches/stumpings	3/–	1/–
- Source: Cricinfo, 19 June 2022

Alan William John Stevenson (born 2 October 1962) is a Scottish former cricketer.

Stevenson was born at Coatbridge and was educated in the town at Coatbridge High School. A club cricketer for Drumpellier Cricket Club, Stevenson made his debut for Scotland in a first-class match against Ireland at Dublin in 1985. He would make two further first-class appearances against Ireland in 1986 and 1987, taking 11 wickets with his off break bowling at an average of 20.45, with best figures of 4 for 18. In addition to playing first-class cricket for Scotland, Stevenson also played List A one-day cricket between 1985 and 1987, making seven appearances against English county opponents in the Benson & Hedges Cup and the NatWest Trophy. As a bowler, he struggled in one-day cricket, taking just 3 wickets at an expensive average of 65.66. Outside of cricket, Stevenson was by profession an electronics technician.
