= Sandy Brown (cricketer) =

Scottish cricketer (born 1950)

Personal information
- Full name: Alexander Brown
- Born: 7 October 1950 (age 76); Coatbridge, Lanarkshire, Scotland
- Batting: Right-handed
- Role: Wicket-keeper

Domestic team information
- Years: Team
- 1977–1987: Scotland

Career statistics
Competition	First-class	List A
Matches	9	21
Runs scored	256	281
Batting average	19.69	14.05
100s/50s	–/2	–/–
Top score	74	47
Catches/stumpings	13/3	15/3
- Source: Cricinfo, 14 June 2022

Alexander Brown (born 7 October 1950) is a Scottish former first-class cricketer.

== Biography ==
Brown was born at Coatbridge in October 1950. He was educated in Coatbridge at St Patrick's School, before going up to Bell College of Technology in Hamilton. A wicket-keeper who played club cricket for both Drumpellier Cricket Club and Uddingston Cricket Club, Brown first played for Scotland in a first-class match against Ireland at Dublin in 1977. He played for Scotland until 1987, making nine first-class appearances, eight of which came against Ireland, and one against the touring New Zealanders. In List A one-day cricket he made 21 appearances across the Benson & Hedges Cup and the NatWest Trophy. Brown scored 256 runs in first-class cricket at an average of 19.69, with two half centuries and a highest score of 74; as wicket-keeper, he took 13 catches and made three stumpings. In one-day cricket, he scored 281 runs at an average of 14.05, with a highest score of 47; as wicket-keeper he took 15 catches and made three stumpings.
