= Jeremy Newman =

English cricketer (born 1962)

Personal information
- Full name: Jeremy John Newman
- Born: 5 June 1962 (age 64); Malmesbury, Wiltshire, England
- Batting: Right-handed

Domestic team information
- Years: Team
- 1981–1993: Wiltshire

Career statistics
Competition	LA
Matches	5
Runs scored	102
Batting average	25.50
100s/50s	–/1
Top score	62
Balls bowled	–
Wickets	–
Bowling average	–
5 wickets in innings	–
10 wickets in match	–
Best bowling	–
Catches/stumpings	3/–
- Source: Cricinfo, 10 October 2010

Jeremy John Newman (born 5 June 1962) is a former English cricketer. Newman was a right-handed batsman. He was born at Malmesbury, Wiltshire.

Newman made his Minor Counties Championship debut for Wiltshire in 1981 against Oxfordshire. From 1981 to 1993, he represented the county in 62 Minor Counties Championship matches, the last of which came against Devon. Newman also represented Wiltshire in the MCCA Knockout Trophy, making his debut in that competition came against Devon in 1985. From 1985 to 1987, he represented the county in 5 Trophy matches, the last of which came against Cambridgeshire.

Newman also represented Wiltshire in List A matches. His debut List A match came against Northamptonshire in the 1983 NatWest Trophy. From 1983 to 1989, he represented the county in 5 List A matches, the last of which came against Warwickshire in the 1989 NatWest Trophy. In his 5 List A matches, he scored 102 runs at a batting average of 25.50, with a single half century high score of 62. In the field he took 3 catches.
