= County Cricket Ground, Swindon =

Cricket ground in Wiltshire, England

County Ground
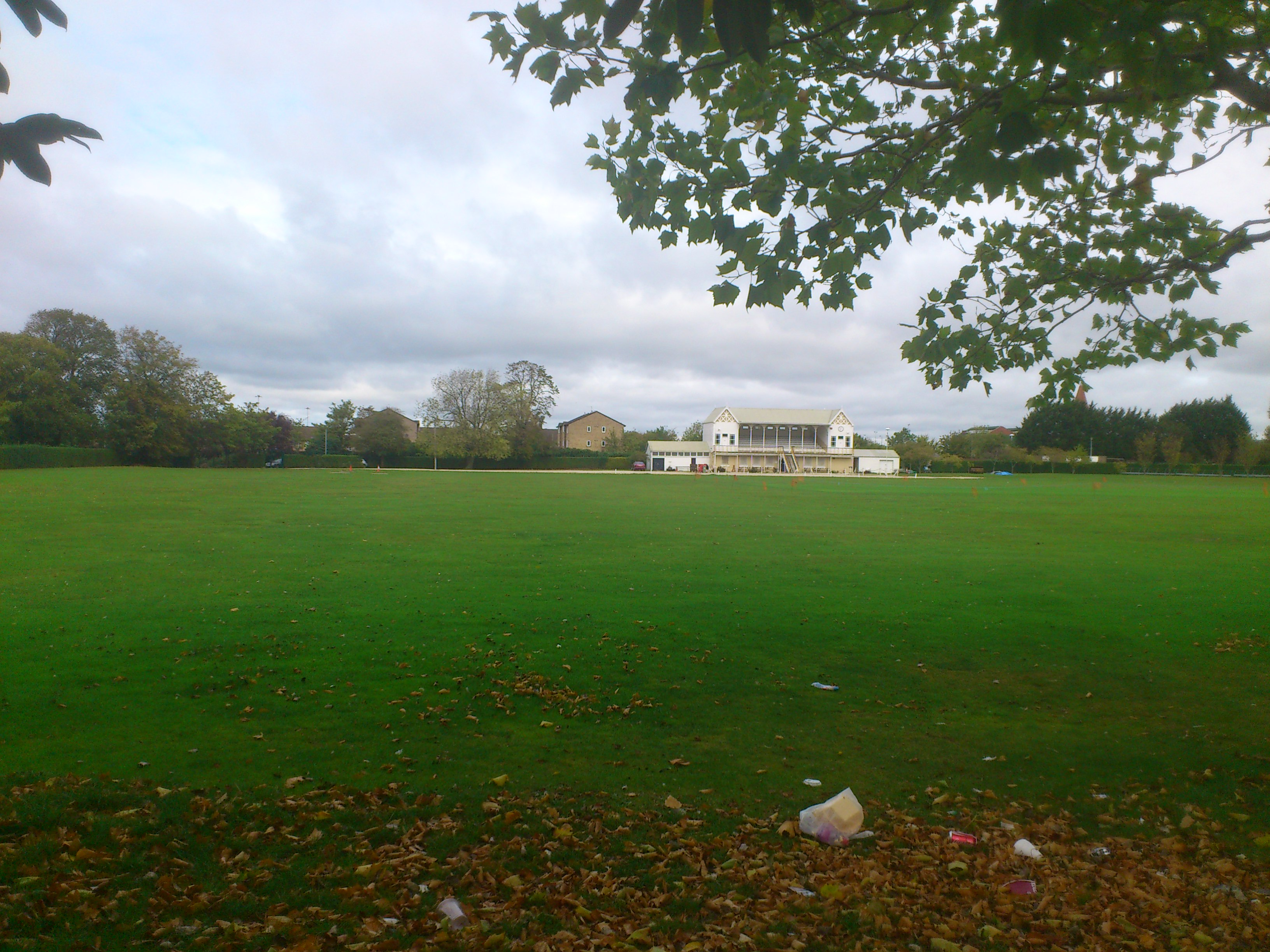
- Interactive map of County Ground

Ground information
- Location: Swindon, Wiltshire
- Country: England
- Coordinates: 51.5657°N 1.7721°W
- Establishment: 1895
- End names
- Pavilion End; Football Ground End

Team information
Wiltshire	(1897–2002)
Gloucestershire	(1970–1992)
- As of 23 May 2010; Source: Ground profile

The County Ground is a cricket ground in Swindon, Wiltshire. The ground is located to the north of the County Football Ground used by Swindon Town. It has played host to first-class and List A cricket matches, in addition to playing host to Wiltshire County Cricket Club in minor counties cricket.

== History ==
Swindon Cricket Club was founded in 1844. The cricket club originally played at a ground where the Upham Road is, before moving to a new ground in the Greywethers Avenue area of Swindon in 1849. The cricket club merged with Swindon Rangers F.C. in 1860, with whom they shared a ground called the Sands in the Goddard Avenue area. In the early 1890s, a group of Swindon businessmen joined together with £700 to buy and develop 5.5 acres (22,000 m^{2}) of land. The County Ground was constructed on this land, with the cricket club (which had recently merged with the Great Western Railway Cricket Club) moving there in 1895. Wiltshire first played minor counties cricket there in 1897, when the County Ground played host to Glamorgan. The ground played host to the strong Wiltshire sides of the first decade of the 20th century, with the county winning the Minor Counties Championship in 1907 and 1909.

During the Second World War the ground was requisitioned by the War Office and became a temporary prisoner-of-war camp. Following the war, Wiltshire continued to play minor counties fixtures there at least once a season. The County Ground played host to its only first-class cricket match in 1967, when a combined Minor Counties cricket team played the touring Pakistanis, which the tourists narrowly won by 23 runs. Three years later Gloucestershire first used the County Ground as an outground when they played Sussex in a List A one-day match in the John Player League. Further one-day matches were hosted there in the 1973 Benson & Hedges Cup when the Minor Counties South cricket team hosted Gloucestershire, followed a decade later by Wiltshire playing two one-day matches in the 1983 and 1984 NatWest Trophy, in which the record attendance of 3,500 was set.

The County Ground played host to international cricket when it hosted two matches in the 1982 ICC Trophy, with Bangladesh versus East Africa and Canada versus Gibraltar. Gloucestershire returned to the County Ground in the 1985 John Player Special League, playing one match in the competition there; this was also the case in the 1986 John Player Special League and 1987 Refuge Assurance League. In 1988, Warwickshire were due as visitors, in addition to Worcestershire against the Minor Counties cricket team in the Benson and Hedges Cup, however the pitch was damaged by weedkiller and the fixtures were moved to Bristol and Haden Hill respectively. After a gap of three years, Gloucestershire played their final batch of three one-day matches at the County Ground in the 1990 and 1991 Refuge Assurance League's, and in the 1992 Sunday League. Wiltshire have not used the ground for minor counties matches since 2002. A campaign was launched in 2006 by the adjacent football club to bring the County Ground back up to county cricket standards, though these plans failed to materialise.

The ground includes a pavilion, which has first floor seating for members. Overshadowing the ground at the Football Ground End is the home ground of Swindon Town F.C.

== Records ==
=== First-class ===
- Highest team total: 218 all out by Pakistanis v Minor Counties, 1967
- Lowest team total: 164 all out by Pakistanis v Minor Counties, as above
- Highest individual innings: 74 by Faqir Aizazuddin for Pakistanis v Minor Counties, as above
- Best bowling in an innings: 8-61 by Intikhab Alam, as above
- Best bowling in a match: 12-119 by Intikhab Alam, as above

=== List A ===
- Highest team total: 354 for 7 by Leicestershire v Wiltshire, 1984
- Lowest team total: 120 all out by Wiltshire v Northamptonshire, 1983
- Highest individual innings: 155 by James Whitaker for Leicestershire v Wiltshire, 1984
- Best bowling in an innings: 4-82 by John Spencer, Wiltshire v Leicestershire, as above
