= Gary Sainsbury =

English cricketer

Personal information
- Full name: Gary Edward Sainsbury
- Born: 17 January 1958 (age 68); Wanstead, Essex
- Batting: Right-handed
- Bowling: Left-arm medium
- Role: Bowler

Domestic team information
- Years: Team
- 1979–1980: Essex
- 1980–1987: Gloucestershire

Career statistics
Competition	First-class	List A
Matches	74	79
Runs scored	179	49
Batting average	5.59	3.76
100s/50s	0/0	0/0
Top score	14*	7*
Balls bowled	11,811	3,533
Wickets	172	77
Bowling average	33.23	31.27
5 wickets in innings	7	0
10 wickets in match	0	0
Best bowling	7/38	4/28
Catches/stumpings	15/–	15/–
- Source: CricInfo, 12 June 2013

Gary Edward Sainsbury (born 17 January 1958) is a former English cricketer. A left-arm medium pace bowler from Wanstead in Essex, Sainsbury played briefly for Essex between 1979 and 1980 following three years in the Essex Second XI. He appeared in only three matches that season, taking eight wickets. He then joined Gloucestershire where he played until 1987, taking 164 First Class and 74 List-A wickets.
