= Martin Stephenson =

English cricketer (born 1949)

Personal information
- Full name: Martin Graham Stephenson
- Born: 25 March 1949 (age 77); Huntingdon, Huntingdonshire, England
- Batting: Right-handed
- Bowling: Right-arm off break

Domestic team information
- Years: Team
- 1972–1993: Cambridgeshire

Career statistics
| Competition | List A |
|---|---|
| Matches | 7 |
| Runs scored | 15 |
| Batting average | 5.00 |
| 100s/50s | 0/0 |
| Top score | 8* |
| Balls bowled | 334 |
| Wickets | 3 |
| Bowling average | 72.00 |
| 5 wickets in innings | 0 |
| 10 wickets in match | – |
| Best bowling | 1/42 |
| Catches/stumpings | 4/– |
- Source: Cricinfo, 26 January 2011

Martin Graham Stephenson (born 25 March 1949) is a former English cricketer. Stephenson was a right-handed batsman who bowled right-arm off break. He was born at Huntingdon, Huntingdonshire.

Stephenson made his debut for Cambridgeshire in the 1972 Minor Counties Championship against Bedfordshire. This marked the beginning of a 21-year career with the county, in which he played 107 Minor Counties Championship matches and following its introduction in 1983, nineteen MCCA Knockout Trophy matches, the last of which came against Bedfordshire in 1993.

It was in the 1972 Gillette Cup that he made his debut in List A cricket for the county against Buckinghamshire. From 1972 to 1992, he represented Cambridgeshire in 7 List A matches, the last of which came against Northamptonshire in the 1992 NatWest Trophy. In his twenty-year List A spell, he scored 15 runs at a batting average of 5.00, with a high score of 8 not out. With the ball he took 3 wickets at a bowling average of 72.00, with best figures of 1/42.

Stephenson currently serves on the Cambridgeshire County Cricket Club Committee.
