= Alan Lilley =

English cricketer (born 1959)

Personal information
- Full name: Alan William Lilley
- Born: 8 May 1959 (age 67); Ilford, Essex, England
- Batting: Right-handed
- Bowling: Right-arm medium

Domestic team information
- Years: Team
- 1978–1990: Essex

Career statistics
Competition	First-class	List A
Matches	120	200
Runs scored	4,495	2,800
Batting average	25.68	18.42
100s/50s	3/24	2/8
Top score	113*	119
Balls bowled	519	93
Wickets	8	6
Bowling average	70.62	11.16
5 wickets in innings	0	0
10 wickets in match	0	–
Best bowling	3/116	2/0
Catches/stumpings	67/–	34/–
- Source: Cricinfo, 15 June 2022

Alan William Lilley (born 8 May 1959) is a former English first-class cricketer.

Lilley was born in Ilford and played for Essex from 1978 to 1990 during the most successful period in their history. A right-handed opening batsman, he scored 4,495 runs in 120 first-class matches and a further 2,800 runs in one day games. Opening the batting with Graham Gooch, he scored a century on his first-class debut in the last match of the 1978 County Championship, helping Essex to a nine-wicket victory over Nottinghamshire.

Lilley top-scored in the final of the Benson & Hedges Cup in 1989 with 95 not out, although he finished on the losing side on this occasion as Nottinghamshire won off the last ball. He also played at Lord's as Essex beat Nottinghamshire in the final of the 1985 NatWest Trophy (although not required to bat on that occasion). Essex won four County Championships while he was with the county, in 1979, 1983, 1984 and 1986. Lilley later worked for the county club as an administrator.

In May 2011, Lilley was arrested for sexual assault. In October 2010 he had resigned from his role as an executive at the Essex County Cricket Club shortly after an investigation was launched into allegations that he had committed a sexual assault at the club's cricket ground. The charges were eventually dropped.
