= Bill Merry =

English cricketer

Personal information
- Full name: William Gerald Merry
- Born: 8 August 1955 (age 71); Newbury, Berkshire, England
- Height: 6 ft 1 in (1.85 m)
- Batting: Right-handed
- Bowling: Right-arm medium

Domestic team information
- Years: Team
- 1984–1987: Minor Counties
- 1984–1991: Hertfordshire
- 1979–1983: Middlesex
- 1978: Minor Counties West
- 1976–1978: Hertfordshire

Career statistics
Competition	First-class	List A
Matches	29	53
Runs scored	50	87
Batting average	6.25	5.80
100s/50s	–/–	–/–
Top score	14*	13
Balls bowled	3,518	2,387
Wickets	52	55
Bowling average	33.15	27.65
5 wickets in innings	–	–
10 wickets in match	–	–
Best bowling	4/24	3/19
Catches/stumpings	6/–	5/–
- Source: Cricinfo, 7 December 2011

William Gerald Merry (born 8 August 1955) is a former English cricketer. Merry was a right-handed batsman who bowled right-arm medium pace. He was born at Newbury, Berkshire and educated at Chells Secondary Modern in Staffordshire.
