= Malcolm Woods =

English cricketer (born 1955)

Personal information
- Full name: Malcolm David Woods
- Born: 22 July 1955 (age 71); Carlisle, Cumberland, England
- Batting: Right-handed
- Bowling: Right-arm off break

Domestic team information
- Years: Team
- 1977–1994: Cumberland

Career statistics
Competition	List A
Matches	7
Runs scored	110
Batting average	22.00
100s/50s	–/–
Top score	36
Balls bowled	336
Wickets	4
Bowling average	68.50
5 wickets in innings	–
10 wickets in match	–
Best bowling	2/33
Catches/stumpings	2/–
- Source: Cricinfo, 31 March 2011

Malcolm David Woods (born 22 July 1955) is a former English cricketer. Woods was a right-handed batsman who bowled right-arm off break. He was born in Carlisle, Cumberland.

Woods made his debut for Cumberland in the 1977 Minor Counties Championship against Lincolnshire. Woods played Minor counties cricket for Cumberland from 1977 to 1994, including 127 Minor Counties Championship matches and 17 MCCA Knockout Trophy matches. In 1984, he made his List A debut against Derbyshire in the NatWest Trophy. He played six further List A matches for Cumberland, the last of which came against Essex in the 1992 NatWest Trophy. In his seven List A matches, he scored 110 runs at a batting average of 22.00, with a high score of 36. With the ball he took 4 wickets at a bowling average of 68.50, with best figures of 2/33.
