= Graham Monkhouse =

English cricketer (born 1954)

Personal information
- Full name: Graham Monkhouse
- Born: 26 April 1954 (age 72); Langwathby, Cumberland, England
- Batting: Right-handed
- Bowling: Right-arm medium

Domestic team information
- Years: Team
- 1987: Cumberland
- 1981–1986: Surrey
- 1973–1979: Cumberland

Career statistics
Competition	First-class	List A
Matches	75	94
Runs scored	1,158	395
Batting average	21.84	13.62
100s/50s	1/3	–/–
Top score	100*	27
Balls bowled	10,126	4,350
Wickets	173	103
Bowling average	27.06	29.64
5 wickets in innings	2	–
10 wickets in match	–	–
Best bowling	7/51	3/20
Catches/stumpings	35/–	20/–
- Source: Cricinfo, 6 December 2011

Graham Monkhouse (born 26 April 1954) is a former English cricketer. Monkhouse was a right-handed batsman who bowled right-arm medium pace. He was born at Langwathby, near Penrith, Cumberland.
