= Brian Evans (Hertfordshire cricketer) =

English cricketer

Brian Gordon Evans (born 23 May 1964, in Preston, Lancashire, England, United Kingdom) is an English cricketer. He was educated at St Chad's College, Durham University. He captained the Durham University XI (1985) and was a member of the university squad 1984–1990. He played for Hertfordshire from 1983 to 1991 as a right-hand batsman, appearing in four "List A" one-day matches. He also played for Middlesex and Gloucestershire (2nd XIs).
