= David Jackson (cricketer) =

English cricketer

Personal information
- Full name: David Christopher Jackson
- Born: 29 June 1953 (age 73); Alnwick, Northumberland, England
- Batting: Right-handed

Domestic team information
- Years: Team
- 1982–1988: Durham

Career statistics
Competition	List A
Matches	4
Runs scored	64
Batting average	16.00
100s/50s	–/–
Top score	40
Balls bowled	–
Wickets	–
Bowling average	–
5 wickets in innings	–
10 wickets in match	–
Best bowling	–
Catches/stumpings	4/–
- Source: Cricinfo, 7 August 2011

David Christopher Jackson (born 9 June 1953) is a former English cricketer. Jackson was a right-handed batsman. He was born in Alnwick, Northumberland.

Jackson made his debut for Durham against Northumberland in the 1982 Minor Counties Championship. He played Minor counties cricket for Durham from 1982 to 1988, making 33 Minor Counties Championship appearances and 7 MCCA Knockout Trophy appearances. He made his List A debut against Lancashire in the 1983 NatWest Trophy. He made 3 further List A appearances, the last of which came against Kent in the 1985 NatWest Trophy. In his 4 List A matches, he scored 64 runs at an average of 16.00, with a high score of 40.
