= Ashok Sitaram Patel =

Kenyan cricketer (born 1956)

Personal information
- Full name: Ashok Sitaram Patel
- Born: 23 September 1956 (age 70); Nairobi, Kenya
- Batting: Left-handed
- Bowling: Slow left-arm orthodox

Domestic team information
- Years: Team
- 1986: Minor Counties
- 1981–1991: Durham
- 1977–1978: Middlesex

Career statistics
Competition	First-class	List A
Matches	3	17
Runs scored	93	334
Batting average	23.25	27.83
100s/50s	–/–	–/1
Top score	30	59
Balls bowled	138	270
Wickets	2	6
Bowling average	48.00	35.16
5 wickets in innings	–	–
10 wickets in match	–	–
Best bowling	2/55	3/26
Catches/stumpings	2/–	3/–
- Source: CricketArchive, 16 October 2011

Ashok Sitaram Patel (born 23 September 1956 in Nairobi, Kenya) is a Kenyan-born cricketer.

Ashok Patel represented Middlesex and Durham as a left-handed batsman and a slow left-arm orthodox bowler in three first-class matches (1978 – 1986) and 17 List A matches (1977 – 1991).

Patel studied at Durham University, where he earned a Palatinate for cricket.
