= Andrew Miller (cricketer, born 1963) =

English cricketer (born 1963)

Personal information
- Full name: Andrew John Trevor Miller
- Born: 30 May 1963 (age 63); Chesham, Buckinghamshire, England
- Nickname: Dusty, Wino
- Height: 5 ft 11 in (1.80 m)
- Batting: Left-handed
- Bowling: Unknown

Domestic team information
- Years: Team
- 1982–1985: Oxford University
- 1983–1987: Middlesex
- 1988–1989: Hertfordshire

Career statistics
| Competition | First-class | List A |
|---|---|---|
| Matches | 69 | 25 |
| Runs scored | 3,131 | 792 |
| Batting average | 31.62 | 36.00 |
| 100s/50s | 3/18 | 1/3 |
| Top score | 128* | 101 |
| Balls bowled | 24 | 6 |
| Wickets | 1 | 0 |
| Bowling average | 14.00 | – |
| 5 wickets in innings | – | – |
| 10 wickets in match | – | – |
| Best bowling | 1/4 | – |
| Catches/stumpings | 20/– | 6/– |
- Source: Cricinfo, 21 September 2023

Andrew John Trevor Miller, born at Chesham, Buckinghamshire on 30 May 1963, was a cricketer who played first-class cricket for Oxford University and Middlesex in the mid-1980s.

Miller was a left-handed opening batsman and an occasional bowler. Having made his debut in one match for Oxford University in 1982, he was highly successful for both the university and his county in the 1983 season, making in total 1,002 runs in just 15 matches at a batting average of more than 43. He won a Blue in that year and in the two following seasons, when he played less frequently. His only full season of county cricket was 1986, when he made 963 runs, but he left the first-class game at the end of the following season.

He later played Minor Counties cricket for Hertfordshire.
