= Ian Smith (English cricketer) =

English cricketer

Ian Smith (born 11 March 1967) is a former English cricketer. Born in Shotley Bridge, County Durham, he was a right-handed batsman and a right-arm medium-fast bowler who played for Glamorgan and Durham.

Smith's first-class debut came during a 1985 Zimbabwean tour of England, a match which Glamorgan drew in spite of a near double-century from the opposition's representative powerhouse, Zimbabwean-born Graeme Hick. Though Smith made his debut in the County Championship at the front end of the 1985 season, he became more of a force during the second half, in spite of a couple of his appearances during the season being cut short by external factors. Having finished the 1985 season in twelfth place in the County Championship, Glamorgan crumbled the following season, picking up just two victories from twenty-four games in the whole of 1986, and finishing bottom of the County Championship, while Smith participated in just one of these victories.

1987 produced a minor upturn in fortunes, and even though Glamorgan finished in the bottom half of the table during this season, they found themselves situated directly behind the 1986 County Championship victors, Essex. Glamorgan's consistency during this time, however, was lacking, at one time winning and losing alternate matches by innings margins. Smith spent the following year out of the first-class game, becoming instead, for the first time for four years, a regular starter in the Second XI, following a hip injury.

Smith returned in 1989, and although in the matches in the first half of the season in which Smith was present, Glamorgan courageously played out several draws in games in which other teams looked strong, the second half of the season was poor, the form on the big occasion deserting the squad. However 1989 was also the season in which Smith hit his first-class best, an innings of 116 against Kent. 1990 was much more positive, with Smith getting back into the rhythm of the first-class game after his troubles, making the season's first showing in the second match of the season, in which Jimmy Cook made what was, at the time, Somerset's second-highest single-innings total by a player.

The Glamorgan team took on Zimbabwe during a tour in the spring of 1991, in which Smith played in one fixture, before returning for the beginning of the domestic season. However, this would be his final season for Glamorgan, with the team still languishing in the bottom half of the table. Smith was subsequently signed by newly established County cricket team Durham, who became the eighteenth members of the County Championship and began in the 1992 season.

Durham's first year was rocky, winning just two matches, though they had amongst their ranks Ian Botham and Simon Brown, along with the Australian Dean Jones. Smith played just one further season for the team, in which they finished bottom of the County Championship with just two victories, following which they had a mass-clearout of the team, with several new players coming into the squad both from other teams and appearing in first-class cricket for the first time. Smith was one of these players to leave the side. After retiring from first-class cricket, Smith emigrated to South Africa, where he still lives today.

Smith appeared in five Youth Test matches between 1985 and 1986, his first coming in an England tour of the West Indies, with his final three coming during a Sri Lankan tour of England. Smith's top score in these matches was a score of 97 achieved in his final Youth Test match. He also appeared in five Youth One-Day Internationals.
