= Robin Dyer =

English cricketer and headmaster

Personal information
- Full name: Robin Ian Henry Benbow Dyer
- Born: 22 December 1958 (age 67); Hertford, Hertfordshire, England
- Batting: Right-handed
- Role: Opening batsman

Domestic team information
- Years: Team
- 1981 to 1986: Warwickshire

Career statistics
Competition	FC	List A
Matches	65	42
Runs scored	2,843	704
Batting average	27.07	19.55
100s/50s	3/18	1/2
Top score	109*	119
Catches/stumpings	39/–	9/–
- Source: Cricinfo, 8 April 2026

Robin Ian Henry Benbow Dyer (born 22 December 1958) is a schoolmaster and former English cricketer who was, until December 2022, the Headmaster of Ampleforth College, a co-educational Catholic boarding school in North Yorkshire.

== Early life and education ==
Dyer was born in Hertford. He was educated at West House School, Birmingham (1966 to 1972) before moving to Wellington College (1972 to 1977) where he captained the College cricket team.

Heading to Durham University (Collingwood College) in 1978, he again captained the cricket team, having already made appearances for the Warwickshire 2nd XI. He graduated from Durham in 1981 with a degree in Politics.

== Cricket career ==
Dyer appeared in 65 first-class matches, all of them for Warwickshire, between 1981 and 1986 as a right-handed opening batsman. He scored 2,843 runs, making three first-class hundreds and 18 fifties, with a highest score of 109 not out. He held 39 catches. In one day cricket, he played 42 matches for Warwickshire, making one century and two scores of fifty, and played in the 1984 Benson & Hedges Cup final at Lord's, when Warwickshire lost to Lancashire.

== Teaching career ==
After leaving Warwickshire in 1986, Dyer became a schoolmaster, returning to his alma mater Wellington College to teach Politics. He was a Housemaster there from 1990 to 2002 and was promoted to Second Master in 2002, continuing until 2019 and serving as Acting Master in the Michaelmas term of 2005 and again in the Lent term of 2014. He worked on the project to create Wellington College International Tianjin and its sister schools in Shanghai and also on the partnership with the Wellington College Academy. He was also in charge of the cricket 1st XI from 1989 to 2003.

In July 2019, Dyer retired from Wellington College after some 33 years, but was promptly appointed as Headmaster of Ampleforth College where he steered the school through turbulent times. With the turnaround completed in November 2022, he retired in December 2022.
