= Alan Walker (English cricketer) =

English cricketer (born 1962)

Personal information
- Born: 7 July 1962 (age 64); Emley, Yorkshire, England
- Batting: Left-handed
- Bowling: Right-arm fast-medium

Domestic team information
- Years: Team
- ????–1993: Liversedge CC
- 1994–1998 and 2004: Durham
- 1988: Marylebone Cricket Club
- 1983–1993: Northamptonshire

Career statistics
Competition	FC	LA
Matches	127	213
Runs scored	917	408
Batting average	11.60	11.33
100s/50s	–/–	–/–
Top score	41*	30
Balls bowled	18,694	9,488
Wickets	298	236
Bowling average	32.26	30.25
5 wickets in innings	6	–
10 wickets in match	1	–
Best bowling	8/118	4/7
Catches/stumpings	43/–	47/–
- Source: Cricinfo, 23 December 2009

Alan Walker (born 7 July 1962 in Emley, Yorkshire) is a former English cricketer. Walker was a left-handed batsman who bowled right-arm fast-medium. His primary role was as a bowler.
