= Mike Younger =

English cricketer

Personal information
- Full name: Michael Edward Younger
- Born: 29 November 1951 (age 74); Corbridge, Northumberland, England
- Batting: Left-handed
- Bowling: Slow left-arm orthodox

Domestic team information
- Years: Team
- 1974–1994: Northumberland

Career statistics
| Competition | List A |
|---|---|
| Matches | 5 |
| Runs scored | 123 |
| Batting average | 30.75 |
| 100s/50s | –/1 |
| Top score | 57 |
| Balls bowled | 204 |
| Wickets | 2 |
| Bowling average | 75.50 |
| 5 wickets in innings | – |
| 10 wickets in match | – |
| Best bowling | 2/32 |
| Catches/stumpings | –/– |
- Source: Cricinfo, 30 June 2011

Michael Edward Younger (born 29 November 1951) is a former English cricketer. Younger was a left-handed batsman who bowled slow left-arm orthodox. He was born in Corbridge, Northumberland.

Younger made his debut for Northumberland in the 1974 Minor Counties Championship against Durham. Younger played Minor counties cricket for Northumberland from 1974 to 1994, which included 156 Minor Counties Championship matches and 20 MCCA Knockout Trophy matches. He made his List A debut for Northumberland against Middlesex in the 1984 NatWest Trophy. He made 4 further List A matches for the county, the last coming against Nottinghamshire in the 1994 NatWest Trophy. In his 5 List A matches, he scored 123 runs at a batting average of 30.75. He made his only half century when he scored 57 against Middlesex in the 1984 NatWest Trophy. With the ball, he took 2 wickets at a bowling average of 75.50, with best figures of 2/32.
