= Nick Gaywood =

English cricketer

Personal information
- Full name: Nicholas Richard Gaywood
- Born: 30 April 1963 (age 63); Newton Abbot, Devon, England
- Batting: Left-handed
- Bowling: Slow left-arm orthodox

Domestic team information
- Years: Team
- 1993–1998: Minor Counties
- 1981–1999: Devon

Career statistics
Competition	List A
Matches	12
Runs scored	228
Batting average	19.00
100s/50s	–/1
Top score	69
Balls bowled	2
Wickets	–
Bowling average	–
5 wickets in innings	–
10 wickets in match	–
Best bowling	–
Catches/stumpings	3/–
- Source: Cricinfo, 6 February 2011

Nicholas 'Nick' Richard Gaywood (born 30 April 1963) is a former English cricketer. Gaywood was a left-handed batsman who bowled slow left-arm orthodox. He was born in Newton Abbot, Devon.

== Minor Counties cricket ==
Gaywood made his debut for Devon in 1981 against the Oxfordshire in the Minor Counties Championship. From 1981 to 1999, he represented Devon in 123 Championship matches, the last of which came against Cornwall. In 1986, he made his debut in the MCCA Knockout Trophy for the county against Durham. From 1986 to 1998, he represented the county in 26 further Trophy matchesm the last of which came against Shropshire.

== List A cricket ==
Gaywood's List A debut for Devon came against Warwickshire in the 1st round of the 1985 NatWest Trophy. From 1985 to 1998, he played in 8 List A matches for Devon, the last of which came against Yorkshire in the 1st round of the 1998 NatWest Trophy. In his 8 List A matches for Devon, he scored 169 runs at a batting average of 20.25, with a single half century high score of 69. In 1993, he was selected to represent a combined Minor Counties team in the 1993 Benson & Hedges Cup. He played a single match in the competition for team, against Durham. He played 2 further List A matches for the team, twice in 1997 and once in 1998.
