= John Spencer (cricketer, born 1954) =

English cricketer

John Spencer (born Arthur John Spencer; 18 August 1954 in Wigan, Lancashire) was an English cricketer. He was a left-handed batsman and right-arm medium-fast swing bowler who played for Wiltshire.

Spencer made a single List A appearance for the team, during the 1984 season, having made a single Second XI appearance for Gloucestershire v Northants while still studying at St Paul's P.E College in Cheltenham, ten seasons previously. Spencer did not bat in the match, and bowled 12 overs, taking figures of 4-82, claiming the prized wickets of David Gower and Peter Wiley in the process.
