= Richard Swan (cricketer) =

Scottish cricketer (born 1951)

Personal information
- Full name: Richard Gilroy Swan
- Born: 6 December 1951 (age 74); Duns, Berwickshire, Scotland
- Batting: Right-handed
- Bowling: Right-arm medium

International information
- National side: Scotland

Domestic team information
- Years: Team
- 1980–1992: Scotland

Career statistics
Competition	First-class	List A
Matches	12	54
Runs scored	374	1251
Batting average	22.00	24.05
100s/50s	–/2	–/6
Top score	77	69
Balls bowled	4	–
Wickets	–	–
Bowling average	–	–
5 wickets in innings	–	–
10 wickets in match	–	–
Best bowling	–	–
Catches/stumpings	8/–	16/–
- Source: Cricinfo, 29 March 2018

Richard Gilroy Swan (born 6 December 1951) is a former Scottish cricketer.

Swan was educated at St. Mary's School, Melrose, Merchiston Castle School, Edinburgh, and Durham University. He played for Durham University cricket team when they won the 1972 University Athletics Union (UAU) title.
