= Geoffrey Ford (cricketer) =

English cricketer

Personal information
- Full name: Geoffrey Charles Ford
- Born: 26 September 1961 (age 65); Oxford, Oxfordshire, England
- Batting: Right-handed
- Bowling: Right-arm medium

Domestic team information
- Years: Team
- 1983–1992: Oxfordshire

Career statistics
| Competition | List A |
|---|---|
| Matches | 8 |
| Runs scored | 187 |
| Batting average | 26.71 |
| 100s/50s | –/2 |
| Top score | 62 |
| Balls bowled | – |
| Wickets | – |
| Bowling average | – |
| 5 wickets in innings | – |
| 10 wickets in match | – |
| Best bowling | – |
| Catches/stumpings | –/– |
- Source: Cricinfo, 20 May 2011

Geoffrey Charles Ford (born 26 September 1961) is a former English cricketer. Ford was a right-handed batsman who bowled right-arm medium pace. He was born in Oxford, Oxfordshire.

Ford made his debut for Oxfordshire in the 1983 Minor Counties Championship against Cheshire. Ford played Minor counties cricket for Oxfordshire from 1983 to 1992, which included 42 Minor Counties Championship matches and 17 MCCA Knockout Trophy matches. He made his List A debut against Warwickshire in the 1984 NatWest Trophy. He played 7 further List A matches, the last coming against Surrey in the 1991 NatWest Trophy. In his 7 List A matches, he scored 187 runs at a batting average of 26.71, with a high score of 62. This came against Warwickshire in his first List A match, with his innings being ended by Alvin Kallicharran.
