= Nigel Felton =

English cricketer

Personal information
- Full name: Nigel Alfred Felton
- Born: 24 October 1960 (age 66); Guildford, Surrey, England
- Height: 5 ft 7 in (1.70 m)
- Batting: Left-handed
- Bowling: Right arm off spin
- Role: Batsman

Domestic team information
- Years: Team
- 1982–1988: Somerset
- 1989–1994: Northamptonshire
- FC debut: 31 July 1982 Somerset v Hampshire
- Last FC: 18 July 1994 Northamptonshire v South Africans
- LA debut: 15 July 1984 Somerset v Glamorgan
- Last LA: 6 July 1994 Northamptonshire v Middlesex

Career statistics
Competition	First-class	List A
Matches	211	160
Runs scored	10242	3564
Batting average	30.12	25.27
100s/50s	15/61	0/22
Top score	173*	96
Balls bowled	288	12
Wickets	2	0
Bowling average	172.50	–
5 wickets in innings	0	–
10 wickets in match	0	–
Best bowling	1/48	–
Catches/stumpings	122/–	47/–
- Source: CricketArchive, 30 September 2008

Nigel Felton (24 October 1960) is an English former first-class cricketer. A left-handed batsman, Felton played county cricket for Northamptonshire and Somerset and was also an occasional off spin bowler. He scored 15 first-class centuries with a highest score of 173 not out, and scored 1000 runs in a season on five occasions.

He captained England Young Cricketers in two test matches and a one-day international on their 1978-79 tour of Australia.

After playing for Kent second XI, he moved to Somerset, where he played more than 100 first-class matches between 1982 and 1988. He received his county cap in 1986. At the end of the 1988 season he moved counties to Northamptonshire, where he was a regular in the team until 1994. His best season was in 1990, scoring 1538 first-class runs at an average of 41.56. He played in two Natwest Trophy finals for Northamptonshire, finishing on the losing side against Lancashire in 1990, and beating Leicestershire two years later.

Since retiring from cricket, he has maintained links with Northamptonshire County Cricket Club, being Commercial director from 1999 to 2002, and serving on both the cricket and general committees. He is currently managing director of a company providing frost and rain protection for sports pitches and racecourses.
