= Justin Benson (cricketer) =

Irish cricketer

Personal information
- Full name: Justin David Ramsay Benson
- Born: 1 March 1967 (age 59); Dublin, Ireland
- Batting: Right-handed
- Bowling: Right arm medium
- Role: Batsman

Domestic team information
- Years: Team
- 1986: Cambridgeshire
- 1988–1993: Leicestershire
- 1994–1997: Ireland
- FC debut: 28 April 1988 Leicestershire v Northamptonshire
- Last FC: 11 August 1997 Ireland v Scotland
- LA debut: 25 June 1986 Cambridgeshire v Yorkshire
- Last LA: 24 June 1997 Ireland v Yorkshire

Career statistics
| Competition | FC | LA | ICC T |
|---|---|---|---|
| Matches | 57 | 101 | 17 |
| Runs scored | 2,158 | 1,556 | 459 |
| Batting average | 28.39 | 19.45 | 32.78 |
| 100s/50s | 4/6 | 0/3 | 0/2 |
| Top score | 153 | 85 | 74* |
| Balls bowled | 824 | 1,645 | 18 |
| Wickets | 11 | 53 | 1 |
| Bowling average | 48.36 | 28.81 | 22.00 |
| 5 wickets in innings | 0 | 0 | 0 |
| 10 wickets in match | 0 | 0 | 0 |
| Best bowling | 2/24 | 4/27 | 1/22 |
| Catches/stumpings | 66/– | 41/0 | 8/– |
- Source: CricketArchive, 30 September 2008

Justin David Ramsay Benson (born 1 March 1967) is a former Irish cricketer. He was a right-handed batsman and right-arm medium pace bowler as well as an occasional wicket-keeper.

Benson attended St Faith's School in Cambridge, England. Though born in Ireland, he spent the early part of his cricket career playing solely in England, starting by playing minor counties cricket with Cambridgeshire before moving on to play first-class cricket with Leicestershire. A highlight of his time at Leicestershire came in helping them to the final of the 1992 NatWest Trophy, Benson being at the wicket at the tight conclusion to a semi-final victory over then County Champions Essex.

He spent five years with Leicestershire from 1988 to 1993 and as his career with them was winding down, he began to play for the country of his birth shortly after they gained associate membership of the International Cricket Council in 1993. He made his debut for Ireland against Australia in 1993 and was then selected for the 1994 ICC Trophy.

He carried on playing for Ireland whilst also again playing minor counties cricket for Cambridgeshire, playing in one more ICC Trophy in 1997 as well as the inaugural European Championship in 1996. His last match came against the MCC at Lord's in August 1997 at which point he had represented Ireland 59 times. He was captain in all his games in 1996 and 1997.
