= John Jameson (cricketer) =

English cricketer (1941–2025)

John Jameson MBE
Personal information
- Full name: John Alexander Jameson
- Born: 30 June 1941; Bombay, Bombay Province, British India
- Died: 13 September 2025 (aged 84)
- Batting: Right-handed
- Bowling: Right-arm medium; Right-arm off-break
- Relatives: Thomas Jameson (brother)

International information
- National side: England
- Test debut: 5 August 1971 v India
- Last Test: 6 March 1974 v West Indies
- ODI debut: 7 September 1973 v West Indies
- Last ODI: 11 June 1975 v New Zealand

Domestic team information
- Years: Team
- 1960–1976: Warwickshire

Career statistics
Competition	Test	ODI	FC	LA
Matches	4	3	361	173
Runs scored	214	60	18,941	4,492
Batting average	26.75	20.00	33.34	28.07
100s/50s	0/1	0/0	33/90	6/20
Top score	82	28	240*	123*
Balls bowled	42	12	7275	1,012
Wickets	1	0	89	36
Bowling average	17.00	–	42.49	21.63
5 wickets in innings	0	–	0	1
10 wickets in match	0	–	0	0
Best bowling	1/17	–	4/22	5/60
Catches/stumpings	0/–	0/–	255/1	61/–
- Source: ESPNcricinfo, 20 September 2025

John Alexander Jameson MBE (30 June 1941 – 13 September 2025) was an English cricketer who played in four Test matches and three One Day Internationals for the England cricket team between 1971 and 1975. Jameson played for Warwickshire County Cricket Club from 1960 until 1976.

Primarily a hard-hitting top-order batsman, Jameson was also a useful occasional off-spin or medium-pace bowler. A capable slip fielder, he occasionally kept wicket. On one occasion, Jameson was a member of a Warwickshire team that boasted three international wicket-keepers, but he had to keep wicket nonetheless: Deryck Murray was injured, Rohan Kanhai had given up keeping, and A.C. Smith had been selected for his bowling.

Cricket correspondent, Colin Bateman, noted, "Born into the era of Boycott, Edrich and Amiss, John Jameson had precious few opportunities to break into Test cricket. A brave, attacking opener who was at his best trying to hammer fast bowling out of the ground, he played a couple of Tests in 1971 but did not help his cause by being run out in three of his first four innings". He is unique in being the only England cricketer to be run out in both innings of a Test match. In addition, he is the only Test cricketer ever to be similarly dismissed in three successive Test innings.

== Early life and career ==
Jameson made his Test debut against India in 1971, scoring 82 in his second Test. His only Test tour was the West Indies tour of 1973–74, on which he was selected for one One Day International and two Tests, without personal success with the bat. He also played two ODIs during the 1975 Cricket World Cup.

Jameson scored 240 not out, his highest first-class score, against Gloucestershire at Edgbaston in 1974, sharing with Kanhai (who scored 213 not out) an unbeaten second-wicket partnership of 465, which remains a record for the second wicket in County cricket.

His brother Thomas Jameson appeared for Warwickshire and Cambridge University in 1970.

== Later career ==
Jameson was born in Bombay, Bombay Province, British India on 30 June 1941. Being born in the sub-continent, Jameson always took a special interest in South Asian cricket. He visited Bangladesh twice with Marylebone Cricket Club (MCC) sides, first in 1978–79 and again in 1980–81. He became an instant hit with the cricket lovers of Dhaka, not so much for his cricket, but more for his rather bulky figure. Later, he served Bangladesh cricket as a coach and helped in the early development of cricket in Bangladesh.

Jameson was a first-class umpire between 1984 and 1987, as well as working as a pitch inspector for the ECB. He was well known for his expertise on the laws of cricket, being called before the Daryll Hair tribunal in 2007 as an expert witness.

He coached at Sussex and was appointed MCC cricket secretary in 1989. Jameson was appointed Member of the Order of the British Empire (MBE) in the 2010 New Year Honours for services to cricket.

== Personal life and death ==
Jameson was diagnosed with diabetes mellitus type 2 in 2004.

Jameson died from a suspected heart attack on 13 September 2025, at the age of 84.
