= Allan Green (cricketer) =

English cricketer (born 1960)

Personal information
- Full name: Allan Michael Green
- Born: 28 May 1960 (age 66); Pulborough, Sussex, England
- Batting: Right-handed
- Bowling: Right-arm off-break
- Role: Batter, occasional wicketkeeper

Domestic team information
- Years: Team
- 1980–1989: Sussex
- 1984/85–1986/87: Orange Free State

Career statistics
Competition	First-class	List A
Matches	164	99
Runs scored	7,932	2,333
Batting average	28.94	26.21
100s/50s	9/35	1/14
Top score	179	102
Balls bowled	4,036	79
Wickets	49	4
Bowling average	44.73	16.50
5 wickets in innings	1	–
10 wickets in match	–	–
Best bowling	6/82	3/16
Catches/stumpings	85/–	26/–
- Source: CricketArchive, 17 November 2024

Allan Michael Green (born 28 May 1960) is an English former cricketer who played for Sussex between 1980 and 1989 and in South Africa for Orange Free State from the 1984/85 season to the 1986/87 season.

He appeared in 164 first-class matches as a righthanded batsman who often opened the batting; he also bowled occasional off breaks. He scored 7,932 runs with a highest score of 179 among nine centuries and took 49 wickets with a best performance of six for 82.
