= List of Devon County Cricket Club List A players =

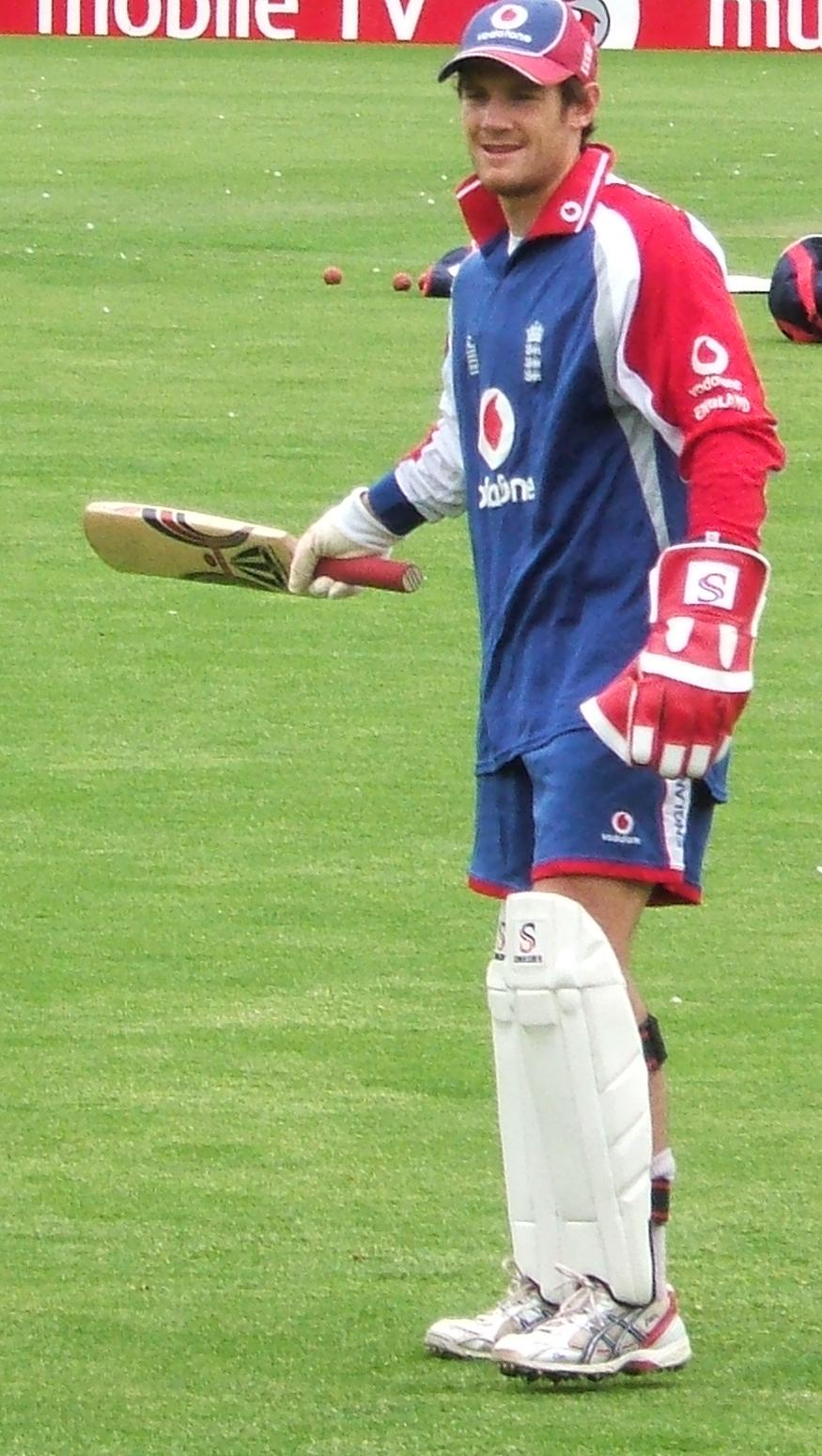
Chris Read, who made three appearances for Devon went on to play 52 times for England.

Devon County Cricket Club was formed in England on 26 November 1899, and first competed in the Minor Counties Championship in 1901. Their first appearance in List A cricket was in 1969, and in total they have played thirty-three matches, making five Gillette Cup, nineteen NatWest Trophy and nine Cheltenham & Gloucester Trophy appearances. (Note: The Gillette Cup, NatWest Trophy and Cheltenham & Gloucester Trophy were all the same competition, under different sponsorship guises.) On five occasions the county progressed to the third round of the competition: in 1999, 2000, 2002, 2003, and 2004. Minor counties teams were excluded from the competition from the 2006 season; Devon's last match was against Essex in the first round of the 2004 competition.

In their thirty-three List A matches, 101 players have represented Devon. Andrew Pugh has appeared the most times for the county, playing in eighteen matches, closely followed by Nick Folland, who made sixteen appearances. Robert Dawson recorded the highest score in List A cricket for Devon, scoring 139 runs against Cumberland in 2002. Dawson, who played 64 first-class matches for Gloucestershire is Devons's leading run-scorer, having scored 492 runs in his thirteen appearances for the county. Andrew Procter's fourteen wickets for the county is the most by any player, but Robert Healey has the best bowling figures, having taken six wickets against Hertfordshire in his only match in 1969. Andrew Hele, who appeared for Devon on six occasions, has claimed the most dismissals as wicket-keeper, taking eight catches and making two stumpings. Ten non-English players have appeared for Devon; Australia's Braddon Green and Stuart MacGill, Malaysia's Arul Suppiah, New Zealand's Roger Twose, Pakistan's Agha Zahid and Aqeel Ahmed, South Africa's JP Duminy and Vernon Philander and Wales' Kevin Barrett and Steve Tomlinson.

The players in this list have all played at least one List A match. Devon cricketers who have not represented the county in List A cricket are not included in the list. Players are initially listed in order of appearance; where players made their debut in the same match, they are initially listed by batting order. Players in bold have played first-class cricket.

== Key ==
**General**

- ♠ – Captain
- † – Wicket-keeper
- **First** – Year of debut for Devon
- **Last** – Year of latest match played for Devon
- **Mat** – Number of matches played for Devon
- **Win%** – Winning percentage

**Batting**

- **Inn** – Number of innings batted
- **NO** – Number of innings not out
- **Runs** – Runs scored in career
- **HS** – Highest score
- **100** – Centuries scored
- **50** – Half-centuries scored
- **Avg** – Runs scored per dismissal
- * – Batsman remained not out

**Bowling**

- **Balls** – Balls bowled in career
- **Wkt** – Wickets taken in career
- **BBI** – Best bowling in an innings
- **BBM** – Best bowling in a match
- **Ave** – Average runs per wicket

**Fielding**

- **Ca** – Catches taken
- **St** – Stumpings effected

== List of players ==
No.	Name	Nationality	First	Last	Mat	Runs	HS	Avg	Balls	Wkt	BBI	Ave	Ca	St
No.	Name	Nationality	First	Last	Mat	Batting			Bowling				Fielding	
1	Robert Staddon	England	1969	1969	1	1	1	1.00	0	0	–	–	0	0
2	Barrie Matthews ♠	England	1969	1984	7	119	66	17.00	0	0	–	–	4	0
3	David Traylor	England	1969	1969	1	4	4	4.00	0	0	–	–	0	0
4	**Jeffrey Tolchard** †	England	1969	1983	5	49	24	9.80	0	0	–	–	2	0
5	**Chris Greetham**	England	1969	1969	1	32	32	32.00	0	0	–	–	1	0
6	**John Solanky**	England	1969	1969	1	3	3	3.00	72	1	1/41	41.00	0	0
7	**Derek Cole** ♠	England	1969	1969	1	1	1	1.00	72	1	1/25	25.00	2	0
8	**Peter Eele**	England	1969	1969	1	2	2	2.00	0	0	–	–	2	0
9	Gerald Trump	England	1969	1969	1	1	1	1.00	72	1	1/42	42.00	0	0
10	**Doug Yeabsley**	England	1969	1987	9	34	22*	17.00	572	6	2/15	52.50	1	0
11	**Robert Healey**	England	1969	1969	1	3	3	3.00	67	6	6/14	2.33	0	0
12	John Tolliday	England	1978	1979	2	10	10	5.00	0	0	–	–	0	0
13	Gary Wallen	England	1978	1988	7	209	104	29.85	0	0	–	–	1	0
14	Ray Tolchard	England	1978	1984	6	77	40	15.40	0	0	–	–	0	0
15	Bob Harriott	England	1978	1980	4	58	27*	19.33	0	0	–	–	0	0
16	**Michael Wagstaffe**	England	1978	1980	3	44	21	14.66	124	2	2/48	38.00	0	0
17	Peter Walker	England	1978	1978	1	2	2	2.00	72	0	–	–	0	0
18	**Bob Cottam**	England	1978	1978	1	2	2	2.00	66	1	1/40	40.00	2	0
19	Geoff Evans †	England	1978	1978	1	2	2*	–	0	0	–	–	0	0
20	Martyn Goulding	England	1978	1985	7	0	0*	0.00	403	11	5/21	21.72	0	0
21	Edwin Picton	England	1979	1980	3	21	17	10.50	0	0	–	–	0	0
22	**Tony Allin**	England	1979	1995	11	30	17	5.00	744	9	2/43	53.55	0	0
23	**Braddon Green**	Australia	1980	1980	2	113	59	56.50	96	1	1/34	42.00	2	0
24	Ian Roberts	England	1980	1980	1	–	–	–	42	0	–	–	0	0
25	**Agha Zahid**	Pakistan	1983	1985	3	70	31	23.33	198	4	2/34	25.00	0	0
26	Christopher Melhuish	England	1983	1983	1	4	4	4.00	0	0	–	–	0	0
27	Joe Oliver †	England	1983	1985	3	57	33*	–	0	0	–	–	2	0
28	**Jack Davey**	England	1983	1985	2	1	1	1.00	120	3	2/45	29.33	0	0
29	**Nick Folland** ♠	England	1984	2001	16	410	104	25.62	20	1	1/52	55.00	12	0
30	**Christopher Rudd**	England	1984	1985	2	41	30	20.50	132	1	1/42	86.00	0	0
31	Martin Taylor	England	1984	1987	2	17	12	8.50	132	1	1/52	149.00	1	0
32	Kevin Rice †	England	1985	1991	6	167	107	27.83	36	0	–	–	0	0
33	Nick Gaywood	England	1985	1998	8	162	69	20.25	2	0	–	–	1	0
34	Hiley Edwards ♠	England	1985	1991	6	52	22*	10.40	6	0	–	–	2	0
35	Christopher Edwards	England	1985	1985	1	5	5	5.00	0	0	–	–	0	0
36	John Tierney	England	1985	1991	5	43	26	8.60	318	5	3/47	50.40	0	0
37	Neil Folland	England	1986	1986	1	30	30	30.00	0	0	–	–	0	0
38	Keith Donohue	England	1986	2000	11	110	31	15.71	686	13	3/41	41.84	2	0
39	Paul Brown	England	1986	1990	3	93	67*	93.00	144	2	2/49	66.00	0	0
40	Richard Turpin ♠	England	1986	1990	4	59	29*	19.66	0	0	–	–	2	0
41	**Martin Olive**	England	1987	1987	1	9	9	9.00	0	0	–	–	0	0
42	Timothy Ward	England	1987	1993	4	37	17	9.25	262	5	3/60	49.80	4	0
43	Richard Twose	England	1988	1988	1	1	1	1.00	6	0	–	–	0	0
44	**Roger Twose**	New Zealand	1988	1988	1	56	56	56.00	60	1	1/48	48.00	1	0
45	Michael Cottam	England	1988	1988	1	0	0	–	72	0	–	–	0	0
46	Mark Woodman	England	1988	1995	6	9	8	3.00	402	3	1/16	70	1	0
47	Andrew Pugh	England	1990	2002	18	271	54	16.93	192	7	2/4	24.57	10	0
48	**Robert Dawson** ♠	England	1990	2005	13	492	138	37.84	66	2	1/15	32.00	2	0
49	Charlie Pritchard †	England	1991	1994	4	1	1*	1.00	0	0	–	–	2	0
50	Michael Record	England	1991	1991	1	8	8*	–	36	0	–	–	0	0
51	Steven Willis	England	1992	1994	3	102	42	34.00	0	0	–	–	1	0
52	**Giles White**	England	1992	1993	2	11	11	5.50	72	1	1/45	45.00	2	0
53	David Tall	England	1992	1992	1	23	23	23.00	18	0	–	–	0	0
54	Greg Hill	England	1992	1992	1	14	14	14.00	0	0	–	–	0	0
55	David Butcher	England	1992	1992	1	1	1	1*	72	2	2/48	24.00	1	0
56	**Julian Wyatt**	England	1993	1995	3	24	15	8.00	42	1	1/25	55.00	3	0
57	David Townsend	England	1993	1993	1	29	29	29.00	0	0	–	–	0	0
58	**Peter Roebuck** ♠	England	1993	2001	9	200	83	40.00	534	11	3/37	25.09	2	0
59	**Andy Cottam**	England	1993	1998	4	24	22*	12.00	212	1	1/45	135.00	1	0
60	**Gareth Townsend**	England	1994	2001	11	249	60	22.63	0	0	–	–	2	0
61	Orlando le Fleming	England	1994	1996	2	0	0	0.00	114	2	2/42	50.00	2	0
62	**Chris Read** †	England	1995	1997	3	47	37	20.00	0	0	–	–	1	1
63	John Rhodes	England	1995	2001	3	0	0	0.00	144	1	1/65	137.00	0	0
64	**Haydn Morgan**	England	1996	1996	1	34	34	34.00	0	0	–	–	0	0
65	Ryan Horrell	England	1996	2000	3	25	25*	25.00	96	2	1/33	35.00	0	0
66	Richard Baggs	England	1997	1999	2	23	18	11.50	0	0	–	–	0	0
67	**Stuart MacGill**	Australia	1997	1998	2	4	4	2.00	120	2	1/29	29.50	0	0
68	**Paul Warren**	England	1997	2001	4	12	12*	–	156	3	1/24	42.66	6	2
69	Kevin Barrett	Wales	1998	2002	2	9	6	4.50	0	0	–	–	0	0
70	Andrew Hele †	England	1998	2001	6	40	19	13.33	0	0	–	–	8	2
71	**Ian Bishop**	England	1998	2004	5	9	7	4.50	270	4	2/90	55.50	0	0
72	Ian Gompertz	England	1999	2000	3	41	18	13.66	48	1	1/5	39.00	0	0
73	Neil Hancock	England	1999	2005	10	324	113*	46.28	531	15	3/18	27.13	5	0
74	**Richard Dawson**	England	1999	2000	3	14	7	4.66	131	4	2/32	22.00	1	0
75	Adrian Small	England	1999	1999	2	84	52	42.00	0	0	–	–	0	0
76	Iain Bond	England	1999	1999	2	0	0	0.00	102	3	2/38	25.66	1	0
77	Russell Bryan	England	1999	2003	2	0	0	0.00	54	0	–	–	0	0
78	Mathew Theedom	England	1999	2002	4	28	19*	28.00	150	5	5/18	25.00	0	0
79	David Lye	England	2000	2005	10	265	121	29.44	16	0	–	–	3	0
80	**Matthew Wood**	England	2000	2003	2	56	43	28.00	0	0	–	–	0	0
81	Andrew Procter	England	2000	2005	10	114	29*	28.50	582	14	3/26	30.07	1	0
82	Steve Tomlinson	Wales	2001	2001	1	30	30	30.00	48	2	2/38	19.00	0	0
83	Russell Jones	England	2001	2001	1	–	–	–	60	2	2/38	19.00	0	0
84	Jeremy Williams †	England	2001	2002	2	45	40	22.50	0	0	–	–	1	2
85	David Court	England	2001	2005	6	104	47	20.80	252	6	2/23	28.66	3	0
86	Stuart Priscott	England	2002	2004	5	206	74	41.20	0	0	–	–	0	0
87	Stuart Stoneman	England	2002	2002	1	2	2	2.00	42	0	–	–	1	0
88	Matthew Hunt	England	2002	2005	3	11	11*	11	180	6	4/22	19.33	0	0
89	David Mitchell	England	2002	2002	1	10	10	10.00	12	0	–	–	0	0
90	Tom Wright	England	2002	2003	2	6	6	6.00	18	1	1/19	19.00	1	0
91	Mark Gribble	England	2002	2002	1	6	6*	–	0	0	–	–	1	0
92	Mark Richards	England	2002	2005	3	11	11*	11.00	180	6	4/22	19.33	0	0
93	Matthew Allin †	England	2002	2003	2	23	19	23.00	0	0	–	–	3	1
94	Trevor Anning	England	2002	2005	2	5	5	5.00	83	3	3/40	20.00	0	0
95	**JP Duminy**	South Africa	2003	2003	1	25	25	25.00	18	0	–	–	0	0
96	**Arul Suppiah**	Malaysia	2003	2005	4	72	36	18.00	102	2	1/24	54.00	0	0
97	Christopher Mole †	England	2003	2005	4	44	40	11.00	0	0	–	–	1	2
98	Robbie Newman	England	2003	2003	1	–	–	–	60	3	3/48	16.00	0	0
99	**Aqeel Ahmed**	Pakistan	2003	2004	2	1	1*	–	92	1	1/27	85.00	0	0
100	**Vernon Philander**	South Africa	2004	2004	2	23	15	11.50	120	2	1/25	46.50	1	0
101	Sandy Allen	England	2005	2005	1	5	5	5.00	0	0	–	–	0	0

== List A captains ==
No.	Name	First	Last	Mat	Won	Lost	Tied	Win%
1	Derek Cole	1969	1969	1	0	1	0	0%
2	Barrie Matthews	1978	1984	6	1	5	0	15%
3	Hiley Edwards	1985	1991	5	0	5	0	0%
4	Kevin Rice	1990	1990	1	0	1	0	0%
5	Nick Folland	1992	2001	4	1	3	0	25%
6	Peter Roebuck	1993	2001	9	2	7	0	22%
7	Robert Dawson	2002	2005	7	3	4	0	43%
**Total**		1969	2005	**33**	**7**	**26**	**0**	**21.00%**
