= Cardiff Metropolitan University =

University in Cardiff, Wales

Coordinates: 51.4843°N 3.1649°W

- Welsh: Prifysgol Metropolitan Caerdydd
- Former names: University of Wales Institute, Cardiff
- Motto: Welsh: Gorau Meddiant Gwybodaeth
- Motto in English: The most valuable possession is knowledge
- Type: Public
- Established: 2011; 15 years ago Cardiff Metropolitan University, 1996; 30 years ago University of Wales Institute, Cardiff (UWIC), 1990; 36 years ago Cardiff Institute of Higher Education (CIHE), 1976; 50 years ago South Glamorgan Institute of Higher Education, 1865; 161 years ago Cardiff School of Art
- Affiliations: Association of Commonwealth Universities; Wallace Group
- President: Rachael Langford
- Students: 12,265 (2024/25)
- Undergraduates: 9,410 (2024/25)
- Postgraduates: 2,855 (2024/25)
- Location: Cardiff, Wales
- Campus: Llandaff, Cyncoed
Colours
- Website: cardiffmet.ac.uk

Cardiff Metropolitan University (Welsh: Prifysgol Metropolitan Caerdydd) is a public university located in Cardiff, Wales. It was formerly known as the University of Wales Institute, Cardiff (UWIC; Welsh: Athrofa Prifysgol Cymru, Caerdydd, APCC) which was established in 1996.

The university offers degree courses in a variety of disciplines. Study is available at undergraduate and postgraduate levels, full-time and part-time, and research opportunities are offered. In the 2021/22 academic year, the university has 11,500 students from over 140 countries studying on two campuses in Cardiff, and more than 10,000 at 17 partner institutions in 15 countries around the world.

In November 2021, Cardiff Met was awarded the title of UK and Ireland University of the Year 2021 by the Times Higher Education. In September 2020, Cardiff Met was named the Times and Sunday Times Welsh University of the Year. In the same year, Cardiff Met was deemed to be the most financially sustainable university in Wales by the Wales Governance Centre.

In January 2023, Professor Cara Aitchison announced that she would retire as Vice-Chancellor and President of the university, and in November 2023, the university announced that Professor Rachael Langford would be the next Vice-Chancellor and President, taking up the role in February 2024.

== History ==
=== Predecessor institutions ===
In 1865 the Cardiff School of Art opened in the Old Free Library Building, St Mary Street. The School of Art moved to the Technical Buildings in Dumfries Place in 1900, then The Friary in 1949, then to a new campus in Howard Gardens in 1965.

In 1940, Cardiff College of Food Technology and Commerce opened at Crwys Road. The Cardiff College of Food Technology and Commerce moved to a new Colchester Avenue Campus in 1966, home to management, business, leisure, hospitality, tourism and food students.

In 1950 Cardiff Teacher Training College opened at Heath Park. Llandaff Technical College opened in 1954 at Western Avenue, home to health sciences, design and engineering students. In 1962 the college moved to Cyncoed, now home to the schools of Education & Social Policy and Sport & Health Sciences .

=== Merging of the colleges ===
In 1976, the four colleges merged to form South Glamorgan Institute of Higher Education. The name changed to Cardiff Institute of Higher Education in 1990, in preparation for Incorporation. In 1992, the Institute joined the University of Wales as an autonomous body. The first Teaching Degree Awarding Powers were granted by the Privy Council in 1993. The institute was given the power to award its own degrees in August but placed the powers in abeyance, choosing instead to strengthen their links with the University of Wales. In 1996, it was granted University College status within the University of Wales and named the University of Wales Institute, Cardiff (UWIC).

In 2003, UWIC became a constituent institution of the University of Wales, and considered merging with the University of Glamorgan. 2004 saw the launch of the FE2HE-UWIC Consortium: a partnership between further and higher education institutions established with Barry, Bridgend, Coleg Glan Hafren and Ystrad Mynach further education colleges, with St David's College joining in 2009. Tony Chapman became Senior Vice-Chancellor and Chief Executive of the University of Wales.

In 2005 the university entered into and then ended merger talks with the University of Wales, Newport. A vote of no confidence was passed by the staff in the Vice Chancellor Tony Chapman. London School of Commerce became an Associate College in 2006.

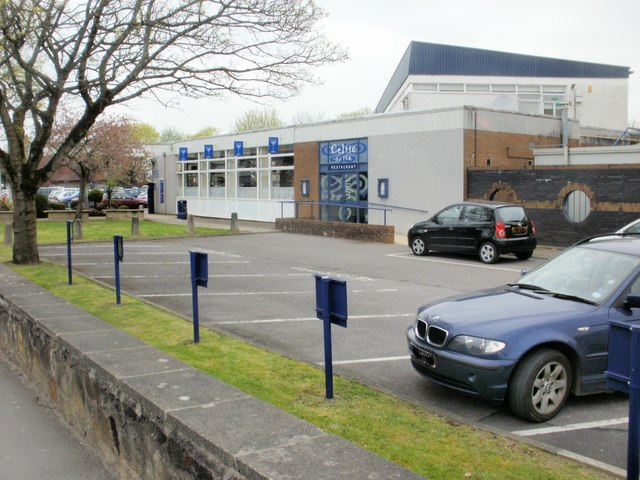
The former Colchester Avenue campus in 2010

In October 2010, the new building for the Cardiff School of Management opened in Llandaff with the closure of the Colchester Avenue campus. In June 2011, the new Learning Centre on the Llandaff campus was officially opened. Merger talks with Swansea Metropolitan and Trinity St David universities were discussed.

=== Split from University of Wales ===
UWIC formally ended its association with the University of Wales, and was renamed Cardiff Metropolitan University in November 2011. The university now awards all of its degrees in its own name. Despite this 'withdrawal' from the University of Wales, the new Cardiff Metropolitan University retains close formal links with it. Until summer 2012 they shared the same Pro Vice Chancellor of Research. Cardiff Metropolitan University briefly continued to supply its staff for the University of Wales to use as moderators for their overseas franchised degrees.

From 2004 to 2007, Cardiff Metropolitan University's Vice Chancellor, Tony Chapman, was the Senior Vice-Chancellor and Chief Executive of the University of Wales, whilst also holding the post of Vice Chancellor at UWIC.

=== Pressure to merge with other HE institutions ===
In December 2003, UWIC withdrew from merger talks with the University of Glamorgan, stating that it was not in the 'best interests of UWIC and the students'. In December 2004, UWIC announced merger talks with University of Wales, Newport, but withdrew from merger talks in July 2005 when the Higher Education Funding Council for Wales stated they indicated that any proposed merger must also include the University of Glamorgan.

On 4 July 2011, UWIC pulled out of merger talks with both Swansea Metropolitan University and the University of Wales Trinity Saint David, for a new University of Wales citing the fact that it was 'dissatisfied with a lack of attention to good governance, due process and administration (in the University of Wales)'. This was despite the fact that its own Pro-Vice Chancellor for Research, Professor Robert Brown, was also one of the most senior figures in the University of Wales, serving as a member of the University of Wales Council. In December 2011 the newly established Cardiff Metropolitan University rejected the plans of the Higher Education Funding Council for Wales for the future structure of Wales' universities which proposed merging it with the universities of Glamorgan and Newport to form the UK's largest higher education institution.

Pressure on Cardiff Met to merge continued to mount throughout 2011 and 2012, however, in line with Leighton Andrews' controversial Higher Education agenda. This included a plan to create a new super-university of 45,000 students in the Welsh Valleys, involving the University of Glamorgan, the University of Wales, Newport, and Cardiff Metropolitan. Newport had already agreed to merger plans put forward by Glamorgan, although it was described as a 'bilateral arrangement' with neither institution technically taking precedence. This merger plan left open the possibility of a third university becoming involved, which was recognised as a reference to Cardiff Met's position.

Cardiff Metropolitan continued to oppose a merger with its neighbours, citing the lack of a business case, concerns that the new institution (which would be the largest campus university in Britain) would simply be too big to manage properly. In response to their efforts, Leighton Andrews (a strong supporter of the mergers on any terms) threatened to forcibly dissolve Cardiff Metropolitan and hand its assets over to the university formed by Glamorgan and Newport's merger. As of October 2012, more time had been granted to consider a three-way merger, but Cardiff Metropolitan still demanded more evidence before committing to further talks. Cardiff Metropolitan has described the existing plans as high cost and high risk, and have threatened to refer the matter to spending watchdogs, including the Auditor General. However, Cardiff Metropolitan stressed that it retained an 'open mind' on the subject of a merger, and has ruled out moving to the private sector.

On 6 November 2012, the threat of dissolution was removed when the Education Minister made a statement to the Senedd that he had taken the decision to cancel the previous consultation on the proposed dissolutions because of a request from the chairs of the University of Glamorgan and the University of Wales, Newport.

== Campuses ==
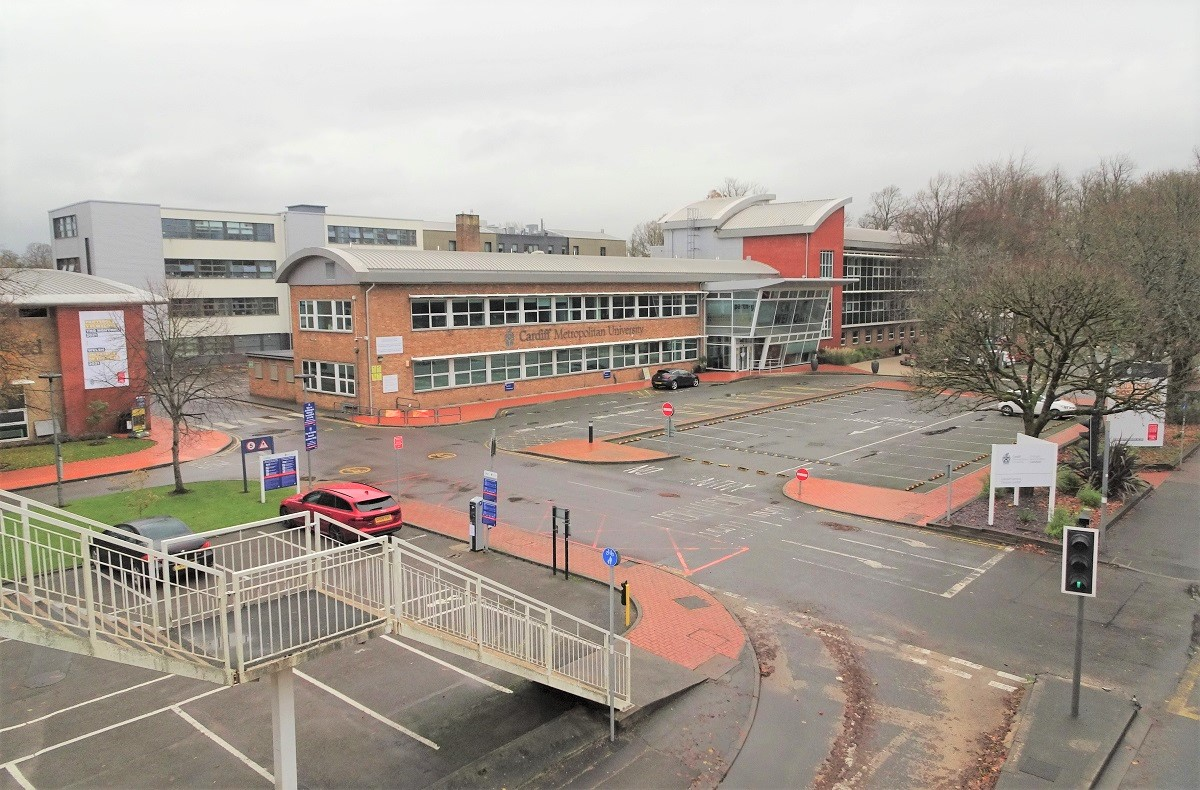
Cardiff Met's Llandaff campus

Cardiff Met has two campus – one at Llandaff and the other Cyncoed.

=== Llandaff ===
Llandaff is the home of the Cardiff School of Sport & Health Sciences (Llandaff), Cardiff School of Management, Cardiff School of Technologies and the Cardiff School of Art & Design. The campus is located approximately two miles from the city centre, surrounded by numerous parks, playing fields and the historic village of Llandaff. This campus is also located near Cardiff Met's Plas Gwyn residential campus.

=== Cyncoed ===
Cyncoed is home to the Cardiff School of Education & Social Policy and the Cardiff School of Sport & Health Sciences (Cyncoed). It offers on-site accommodation and a new purpose-built Campus Centre. The campus offers sporting facilities, an on-site shop, coffee bars and a refectory. The campus also acts as the head office for the Students' and Athletics Union.

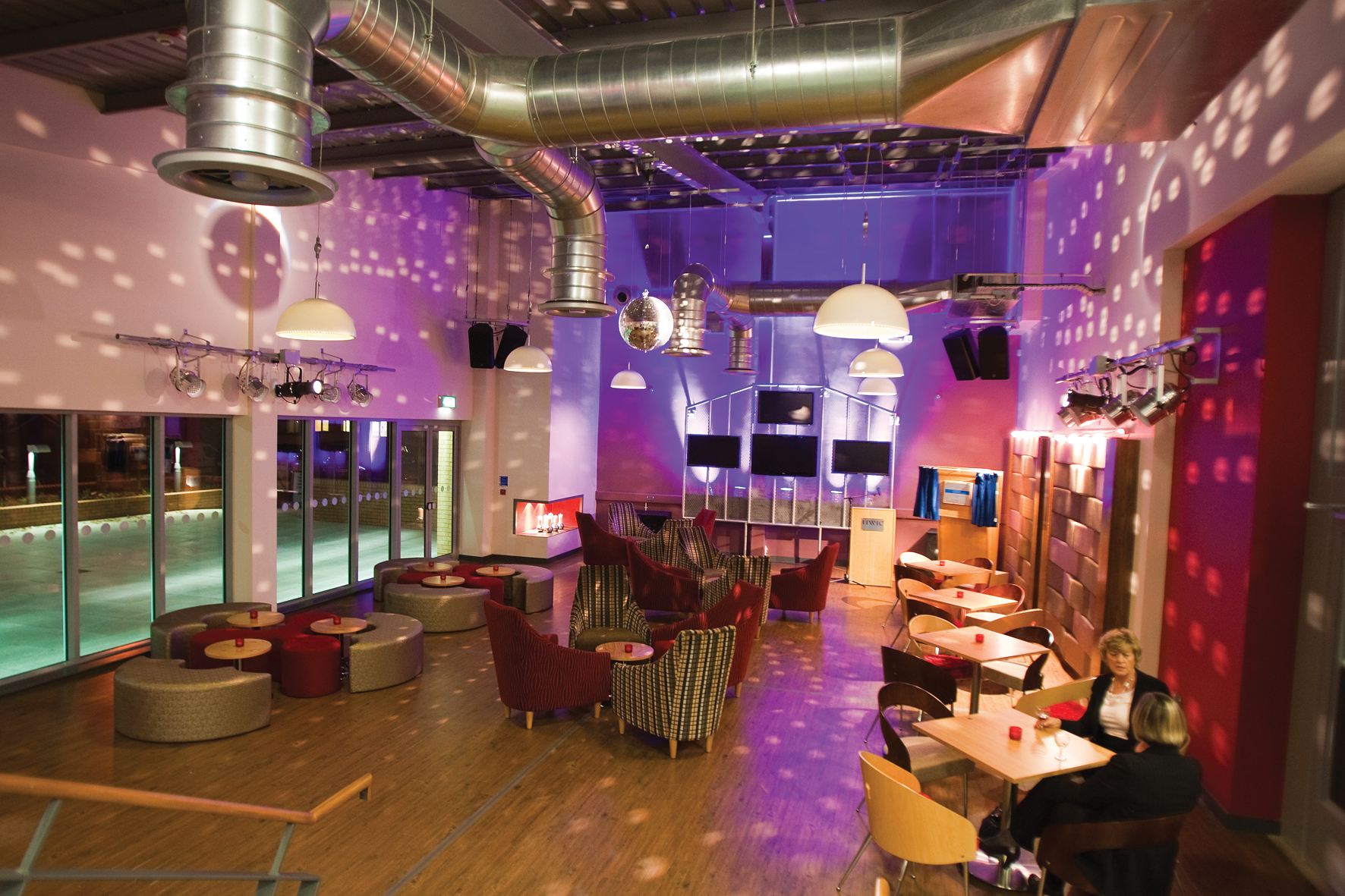
UWIC's Student Centre at Cyncoed

The Student I-Zone opened in October 2010 to provide information to students from one location.

== Organisation ==
Cardiff Metropolitan University is made up of five academic schools:

- Cardiff School of Art & Design
- School of Education & Social Policy
- Cardiff School of Management
- Cardiff School of Sport and Health Sciences
- Cardiff School of Technology

=== Cardiff School of Art & Design ===
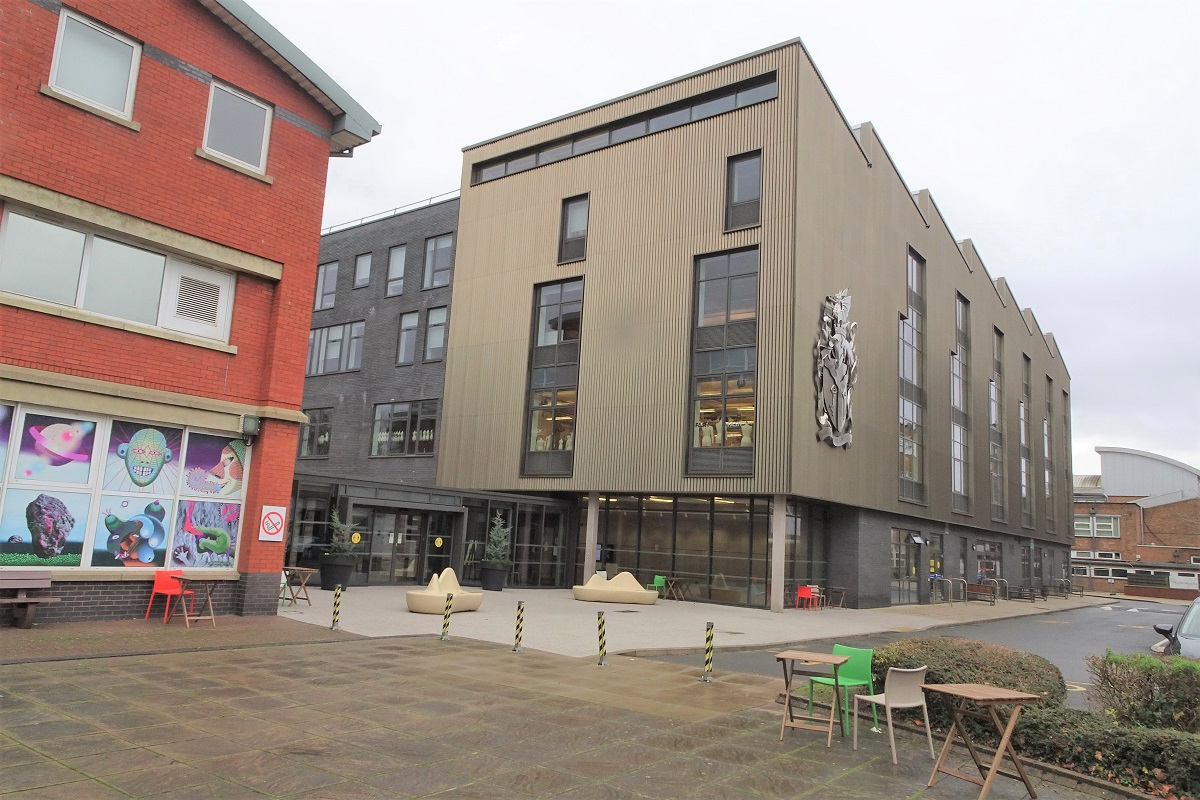
School of Art and Design main building

Cardiff School of Art & Design opened in 1865 as the Cardiff School of Art and is the oldest constituent part of the university. As of 2025, CSAD offers fifteen undergraduate degrees and eleven postgraduate master's degrees.

The school is housed in a modern building on the Llandaff Campus. The School houses the FabLab and Perceptual Experience Laboratory that are open to both the public and the student body. Workshop facilities for all subject areas are open to students on a cross-disciplinary basis and include access to digital and manual processes including 3D scanning, chemical photographic developing, foundry casting and printmaking on and with ceramic, plastics and paper including one Columbia Press which is as old as the School itself.

The school was assessed as number 39 of the top 80 destinations to study art and design in the UK by the Guardian's University Guide in 2010.

=== Cardiff School of Education & Social Policy ===
The School of Education & Social Policy has over 2000 students and over 100 academic and administrative staff. The School was established in 1951 to provide Initial Teacher Education Training (ITET) provision in Cardiff, and it remains the largest in Wales.

In September 2017, the university's Health and Social Care, Social Work and Housing Studies programmes merged into school of education to become the School of Education & Social Policy.

=== Cardiff School of Management ===
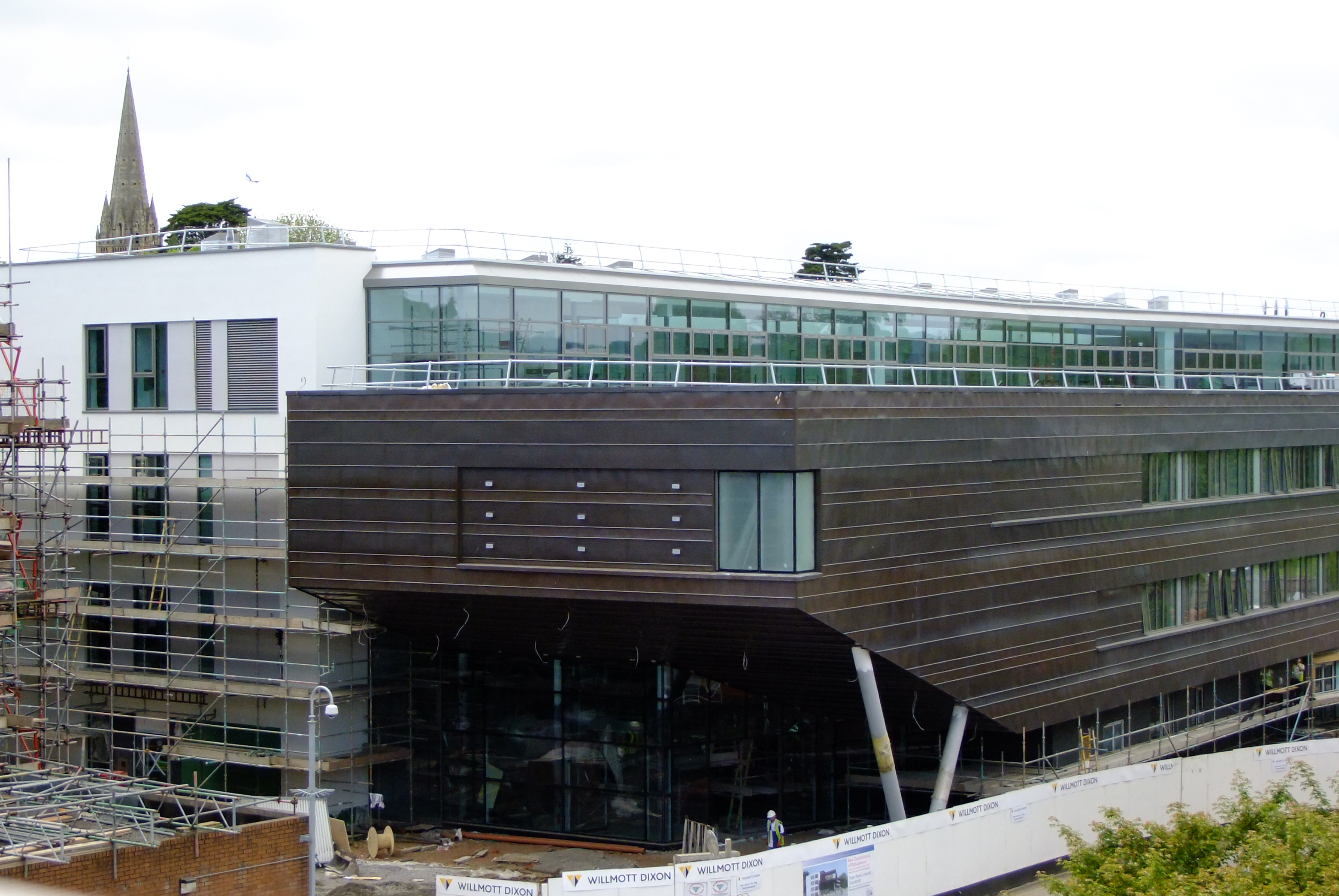
Cardiff Met's Cardiff School of Management Building

The School of Management is based at the Llandaff Campus. It moved to a new building in October 2010 following the closure of the Colchester Avenue campus. Research activities at the School are organised into five broad themes within business and management and six Research Centres in specific areas.

=== Cardiff School of Sport and Health Sciences ===
In September 2017, the Cardiff School of Sport merged with the Cardiff School of Health Sciences creating the Cardiff School of Sport and Health Sciences. The school is currently split between the university's two campuses, with sports at based at Cyncoed and health sciences at Llandaff; however, the university plans to unite the school at the Cyncoed campus following investment in new facilities.

School of Health Sciences

The School of Health Sciences is made up of 9 areas and provides applied research and consultancy services. These include: the Centre for Biomedical Research, the Centre for Health, Safety & the Environment, the Food Research & Consultancy Unit, the Zero2Five Food Industry Centre, the Wales Centre for Podiatric Studies and the Department of Applied Psychology.

School of Sport

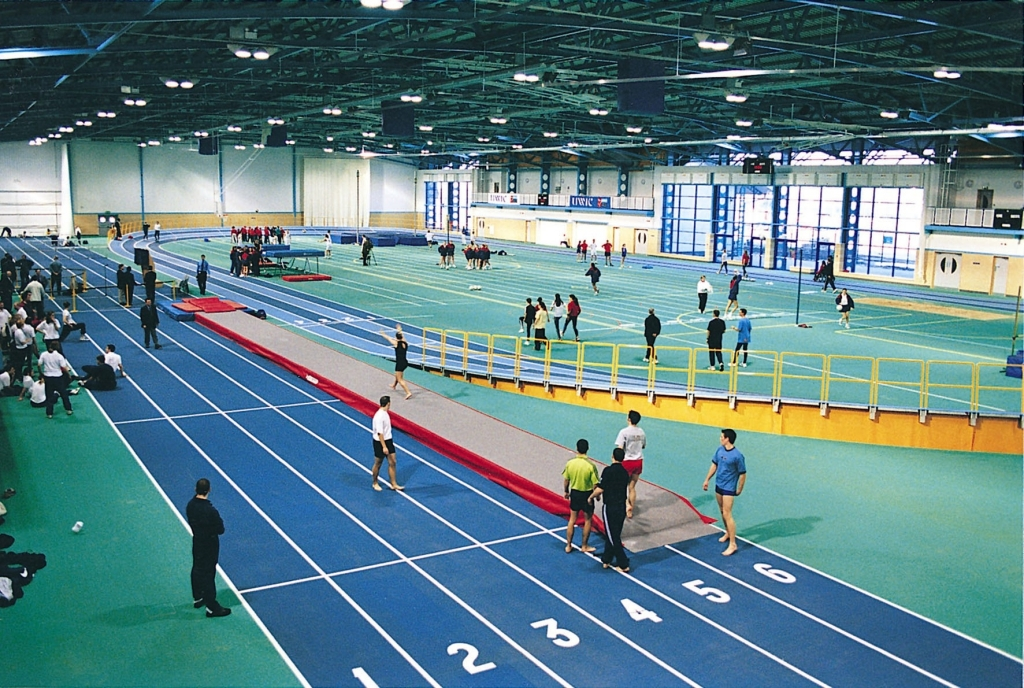
The National Indoor Athletics Centre at Cyncoed

The School of Sport is based at the Cyncoed Campus, Cardiff.

The National Indoor Athletics Centre is an indoor athletics centre housed at the university's Cyncoed campus and was opened in January 2000 by Colin Jackson. The centre offers multi-sport provision and includes a sports injuries clinic and biomechanics laboratory. It is the only designated 'High Performance Centre' in Wales.

=== Cardiff School of Technology ===
The Cardiff School of Technology was created in 2018.

=== Research & Enterprise Centres ===
Cardiff Metropolitan University's research includes a number of research centres, offering applied research and consultancy to business and industry, and to local and national government across the UK and abroad. This includes the ZERO2FIVE Food Industry Centre and the National Centre for Product Design & Development Research (PDR).

== Academic profile ==
=== Reputation and rankings ===
Rankings
National rankings
- Complete (2027): 66
- Guardian (2027): 89
- Times / Sunday Times (2027): 78=

Global rankings
- THE (2026): 1001–1200

As of 2016 the university is ranked as the top 'new' university in Wales by the major university guides – The Guardian University Guide 2013, the Complete University Guide 2013 published in The Independent and the Times Good University Guide 2013.

Cardiff Metropolitan University has been independently acclaimed for its academic standards, with an old Quality Assurance Agency for Higher Education Institutional Report (2008) stating that 'confidence can be placed in the soundness of the institution's current and likely future management of the quality of its programmes and of the academic standards of the associated awards.'

In 2021, the university won the Times Higher Education University of the Year award.

== Student life ==
=== Accommodation ===
Cardiff Metropolitan University has student accommodation available close to its campuses in Cyncoed and at Plas Gwyn. The university also has agreements with private residences such as Tŷ Pont Haearn in the city centre, which has 179 beds reserved for students and Victoria Hall which is located near to the Llandaff Campus and has 198 beds reserved for students.

=== Sport ===
Sports teams

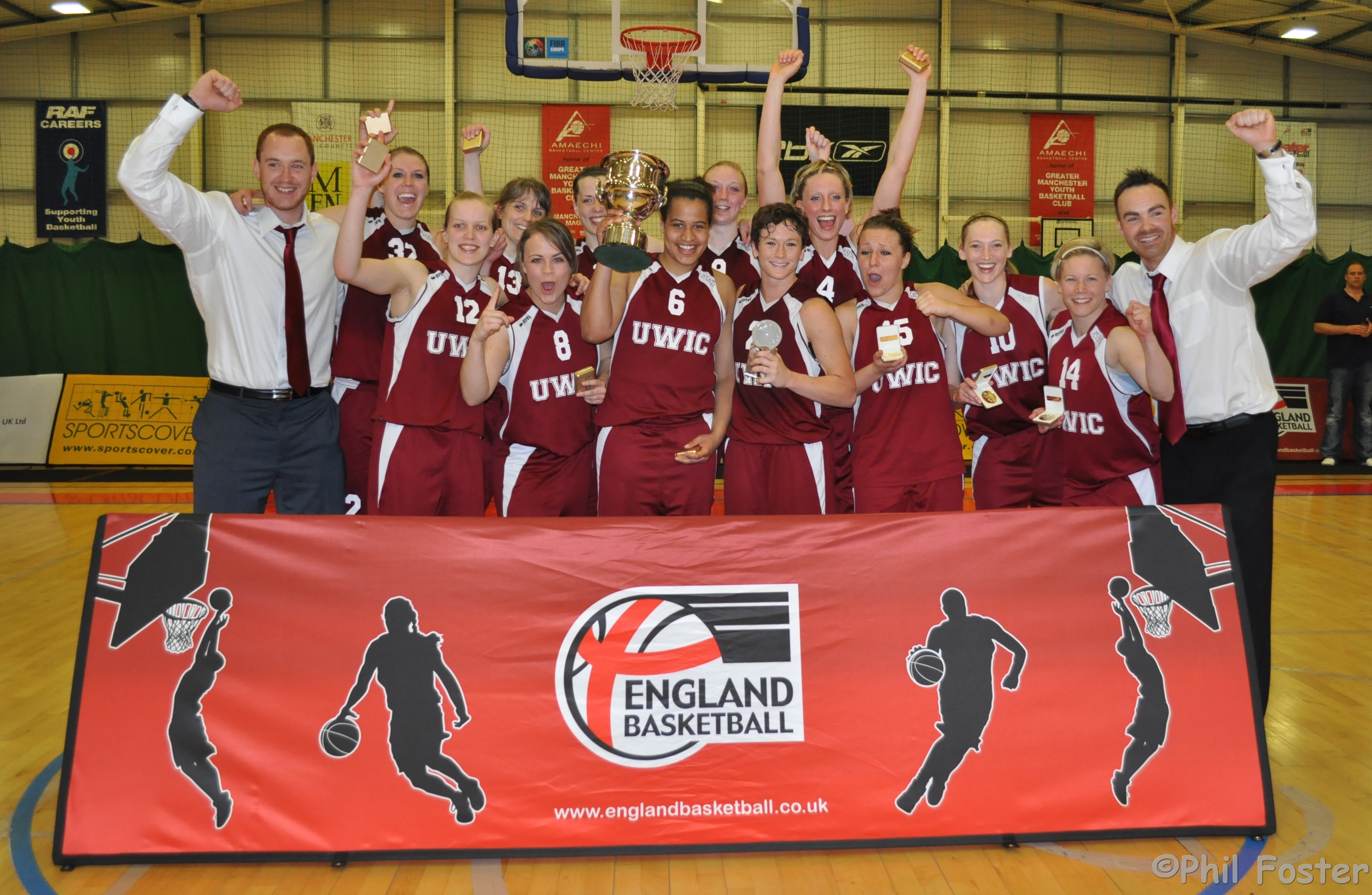
Cardiff Metropolitan University Archers

- Cardiff Metropolitan University RFC
- Cardiff Metropolitan University F.C.
- Cardiff Metropolitan University Archers
- Cardiff Metropolitan Universityuwic Gaelic Football Club

=== National Indoor Athletics Centre ===
This large indoor sporting facility is a venue for many sporting events such as the Welsh Open Taekwon-Do Championships hosted there each year by the United Kingdom Taekwon-Do Association. The UK Open Taekwon-Do Championship is often held there too.

== Notable alumni ==
Cardiff Metropolitan University (formerly UWIC) has alumni in the fields of sport, art, education, design, nutrition, business, healthcare and media.

Arts

- Phil Carradice
- Ken Elias
- David Emanuel
- Karl Hyde
- Neil Jackson
- Julian Kostov
- Julien Macdonald

Media

- Michael Buerk
- Jill Dando
- John Inverdale
- Sue Lawley
- Jane Moore
- Rick O'Shea
- Roy Noble
- Phil Steele
- Rhodri Williams

Sport

- Rory Burns – international cricketer
- Sophie Burton – sport and exercise biomechanist
- Gareth Cooper
- Kieran Crawford
- Ellie Curson
- Lynn Davies – Olympic Gold Medallist
- John Devereux
- Alex Dombrandt
- Gareth Edwards
- Ben Evans
- Non Evans
- Gable Garenamotse
- Helen Glover – Olympic Gold Medallist
- Greg Holmes, cricketer
- Alex Jones, cricketer
- Ryan Jones
- Ieuan Lloyd
- Hugh Morris
- Brett Morse – Olympic Discus thrower
- Elli Norkett
- Ken Owens
- Nicky Piper
- David Richards
- Steve Tomlinson
- Ben Simons – Olympic Bobsleigh Athlete
- Colin Smart
- Asa Tribe – cricketer
- J. J. Williams

Businesspeople and entrepreneurs

- Blandina Khondowe
- Brian Hancock

Politics

- Alun Michael, Former First Minister of Wales
- Joshua Reynolds, Member of UK Parliament
- Chris Elmore, Member of the UK Parliament
- Gareth Bennett

== See also ==
- Armorial of UK universities
- Education in Wales
- List of UK universities
- List of universities in Wales
