= John Rhodes =

John Rhodes may refer to:

== Politics and law ==
- Sir John Rhodes, 2nd Baronet (1884–1955), British businessman and MP
- John Q. Rhodes Jr. (1892–1959), American politician in Virginia
- John Jacob Rhodes (1916–2003), U.S. Representative from Arizona
- John Rhodes (Canadian politician) (1929–1978), Canadian politician in Ontario
- John Jacob Rhodes III (1943–2011), U.S. Representative from Arizona
- John W. Rhodes (fl. 2003–2007), American politician in North Carolina

== Sports ==
- John Rhodes (sailor) (1870–1947), English sailor and Olympic gold medalist
- John Rhodes (coach) (1902–1951), American football and baseball player and coach
- Gordon Rhodes (John Gordon Rhodes, 1907–1960), American baseball player
- John Rhodes (racing driver) (born 1927), British Formula One driver
- John Rhodes (cricketer) (born 1962), English cricketer
- John Rhodes (basketball) (born 1965), American basketball coach and player
- John Rhodes (baseball) (born 2000), American baseball player

== Others ==
- John Rhodes (17th century) (fl. 1624–1665), English theatrical figure
- John Milson Rhodes (1847–1909), English general practitioner and pioneer of social reform
- John Harold Rhodes (1891–1917), English recipient of the Victoria Cross
- John Rhodes (mathematician) (born 1937), American mathematician, co-developer of Krohn–Rhodes theory
- John M. Rhodes, United States National Guard general

== See also ==
- Johnny Rhodes (disambiguation)
