= Folland =

Folland is a surname. Notable people with the surname include:

- Alison Folland (born 1978), American actress and filmmaker
- Gerald Folland (born 1947), American mathematician
- Henry Folland (1889–1954), British aviation engineer and aircraft designer
- Leah Norah Folland (1874–1957), British educationalist, philanthropist and politician
- Michael Fleming Folland (1949–1969), United States Army soldier
- Neil Folland (born 1960), British cricketer
- Nicholas Folland (born 1967), Australian artist and arts educator
- Nick Folland (born 1963), British cricketer
- Rob Folland (born 1979), British footballer
- William H. Folland (c. 1878–1941), associate justice of the Utah Supreme Court

== See also ==
- Folland (disambiguation)
