= Kevin Barrett =

Kevin Barrett may refer to:

== Sportsmen ==
- Kevin Barrett (cricketer) (born 1975), Welsh cricketer
- Kevin Barrett (footballer) (1915–1984), Australian rules footballer
- Kevin Barrett (rugby union, born 1980), English rugby union player
- Kevin Barrett (rugby union, born 1966), New Zealand rugby union player

== Other ==
- Kevin Barrett (game designer), role-playing game designer
- Kevin Barrett, 9/11 conspiracy theorist
