= NIAC =

NIAC may refer to:

- NASA Institute for Advanced Concepts, an external NASA program that closed in 2007
- NASA Innovative Advanced Concepts, an internal NASA program that began in 2010
- National Immunisation Advisory Committee, an immunization advisory committee in Ireland
- National Indoor Athletics Centre, an indoor track and field athletics sports venue in Cardiff, Wales
- National Infrastructure Advisory Council, a council of the United States Department of Homeland Security
- National Infrastructure Assurance Council, replaced by the National Infrastructure Advisory Council as of the signing of U.S. Executive Order 13231
- National Iranian American Council, an association of Iranian-Americans
- Nationwide Investigation Advisory Committee a committee within the United States Department of Justice (DOJ)
- Nebraska Intercollegiate Athletic Conference or Nebraska-Iowa Athletic Conference, former names of the Great Plains Athletic Conference, American college athletic conference
- Non-International Armed Conflict, a type of conflict defined in International Humanitarian Law
- Nonprofits Insurance Alliance of California, the first and largest organization in the Nonprofits Insurance Alliance Group
- Northern Ireland Assembly Commission, the corporate body of the Northern Ireland Assembly
- Northern Indiana Athletic Conference, an IHSAA Athletic Conference based in South Bend, Indiana.
- Northern Intercollegiate Athletic Conference, a college athletic conference in North Dakota, Minnesota and Manitoba
- Nuclear Industry Assessment Committee, an organization that shares auditing services among its members
