= Staddon =

Staddon is a surname. Notable people with the surname include:

- Bradley Staddon (born 1984), Zimbabwean cricketer
- Ernest Staddon (1882–1965), English cricketer
- J. E. R. Staddon, British-born American psychologist
- Jessica Staddon, American computer scientist
- Robert Staddon (disambiguation), multiple people

== See also ==
- Stadden, another surname
