= Peter Walker =

Peter or Pete Walker may refer to:

== Politics ==
- Peter Walker (Australian politician) (1922–1987)
- Peter Walker, Baron Walker of Worcester (1932–2010), British politician
- Peter Walker (RAF officer) (1949–2015), Lieutenant Governor of Guernsey

== Sports ==
- Peter Walker (cricketer, born 1936) (1936–2020), English cricketer and broadcaster
- Peter Walker (cricketer, born 1952), English cricketer for Devon
- Peter Walker (footballer) (1942–2010), Australian rules footballer
- Peter Walker (golfer), Scottish golfer
- Peter Walker (racing driver) (1912–1984), British racing driver
- Pete Walker (baseball) (born 1969), baseball player for the Toronto Blue Jays

== Other ==
- Peter Walker (actor) (born 1927), American film, stage and television actor
- Peter Walker (brewer) (died 1879), Scottish brewer
- Peter Walker (bishop) (1919–2010), Anglican bishop
- Peter Walker (guitarist) (born 1937), American folk guitarist
- Peter Walker (dancer), American ballet dancer
- Peter Walker (landscape architect) (born 1932), American
- Pete Walker (director) (born 1939), British film director
- Peter J. Walker (1916–2003), British musician and audio engineer, founder of Quad Electroacoustics
- Peter Walker (sculptor) (born 1974), British sculptor
