= Adrian Aymes =

English cricketer (born 1964)

Adi Aymes
Personal information
- Full name: Adrian Nigel Aymes
- Born: 4 June 1964 (age 62); Southampton, Hampshire, England
- Batting: Right-handed
- Role: Wicket-keeper

Domestic team information
- Years: Team
- 1987–2002: Hampshire
- FC debut: 13 June 1987 Hampshire v Surrey
- Last FC: 14 August 2002 Hampshire v Somerset
- LA debut: 14 June 1987 Hampshire v Derbyshire
- Last LA: 15 August 2001 Hampshire v Durham

Career statistics
Competition	First-class	List A
Matches	215	221
Runs scored	7,338	2,210
Batting average	31.22	23.26
100s/50s	8/38	0/6
Top score	133	73*
Balls bowled	246	–
Wickets	6	–
Bowling average	73.00	–
5 wickets in innings	0	–
10 wickets in match	0	–
Best bowling	2/101	–
Catches/stumpings	516/44	215/53
- Source: CricketArchive, 11 November 2007

Adrian Nigel Aymes (born 4 June 1964), known as Adi Aymes, was a first-class cricketer for Hampshire County Cricket Club, where he was a right-handed batsman and wicket-keeper for fifteen years, winning the Natwest Trophy in 1991. His interest in both football and cricket saw him play the former in his youth, making appearances for Bristol Rovers reserves and becoming assistant-manager of Lymington Town before becoming a full-time cricketer aged 24.

On retiring from first-class cricket, he returned to football, becoming joint manager of Fleet Town. He is the fitness coach and general manager of Havant and Waterlooville.

== Early career ==
Aymes attended Bellemoor School, and began playing for his local village side, Hursley Park, aged 11. Hampshire turned Aymes down as a schoolboy, but Aymes practised hard, and was still in the Hursley Park side when they competed in the National Village Championship final nine years later at Lord's in 1984. Hampshire were unable to ignore his heavy run-scoring any longer, and Aymes made a successful debut for Hampshire Second XI against Middlesex Second XI in August 1985. He had a hand in five dismissals (four catches and one stumping), and scoring 53 runs not out in the second innings. He became a Second XI regular for the 1986 season, and also competed in the Warwick Under-25 Competition. Between 1985 and 1990, Aymes played 116 matches for the Second XI, scoring 2920 runs which included 8 half-centuries and 3 centuries (although his highest score was only 105 not out).

Aymes' first-class debut was against Surrey in June 1987, deputising for Bobby Parks. He scored 58 runs in the first innings and took one catch. He also made his debut in the List A game against Derbyshire, played on a rest day during a first-class fixture, taking two catches and effecting one stumping. He deputised for two matches in the 1988 season, and one in the 1989 before finally displacing Parks in August 1990.

== First-class career ==
Having previously made Second XI Championship appearances since his debut in 1985 (playing most extensively between 1986 and 1990) he broke into first-class cricket with sporadic appearances from August 1990, including a match against a team of Sri Lankans during a tour of England in 1990. He continued to play first-class cricket extensively for the next twelve years.

He is considered by the Hampshire Cricket Society to be the best wicket-keeper to wear the gloves regularly. Although Bobby Parks made the most dismissals (700), and Neil McCorkell (between 1932 and 1951) scored the most runs (15,834, including the five highest scores by a Hampshire 'keeper), Aymes is considered to combine the two skills to the greatest effect. McCorkell passed the benchmark '1000 runs in a season' 9 times, a feat Aymes failed to match. This is in part due to Aymes only averaging 27 innings per season compared with McCorkell's 46. Only 12 players have a higher Hampshire batting average than Aymes' 31.22, undoubtedly helped by Aymes remaining undefeated in 25% of his visits to the crease.

Aymes was a technically correct batsman who prided himself on not giving his wicket away, and was often required to shore up batting inadequacies in the side. Hampshire struggled in their two seasons in Division 1 (in 2000 and 2000); this unfortunately coincided with Aymes' hand and knee injuries. Aymes was regarded as the best wicket-keeper in the County Championship, being equally adept at standing back to the West Indies fast bowler Malcolm Marshall and standing up to the leg spin of Shane Warne. It was in standing up to his medium pace bowlers that brought the downfall of David Ward in the 1991 Natwest Trophy Final, which turned the fate of the match. Aymes was also unlucky not to participate in the 1998–99 tour of Australia after a slight dip of form towards the end of the season.

His benefit year in 2000 raised £174,995, and included the first cricket match of the new millennium in Hambledon, the site of the first cricket club. Throughout 2002 he suffered with a knee injury, which only allowed him to play 5 matches. With the up-and-coming Nic Pothas taking his place, he ended his Hampshire contract with one year still to serve, and retired from professional cricket.

== Post first-class career ==
On retirement from first-class cricket, Adi returned to captain his village side, Hursley Park, competing in the ECB Southern Premier League. Alan Jones, the Hursley chairman said, "We're delighted to have Adi back with us. His ability and sheer enthusiasm for the game will give everyone at the club a boost." Aymes, who last played for Hursley Park in 1989, marked his return to recreational cricket with 119 in a record club league opening-partnership of 231 with Roman Prendergast.

As a favour to chairman Martin Griffiths (who was in charge of Aymes' benefit committee in 2000), he became joint manager of football side Fleet Town in 2002–03 alongside Mark Dennis, steering them away from near-certain relegation, and winning the Russell Cotes Cup. It was even necessary for Aymes to put on his boots and play in goal for Fleet. When goalkeeper Tyrone King fell awkwardly and went to hospital, Aymes played in goal for the second half. He let in two goals as Fleet lost to Sittingbourne 3–0. After Dennis left the club to become Director of Football at Eastleigh Town in June 2003, Aymes followed him out of Fleet saying it was "geographically not possible" to stay on in charge at Calthorpe Park for another season. On joining Havant & Waterlooville as fitness coach during the 2005–06 season he had a "tremendous impact on the stamina of the players", and took on the responsibilities of the club manager the following year.
