= Melhuish =

Melhuish is an English surname. Notable people with the surname include:

- Christopher Melhuish (born 1955), English cricketer
- Edward Melhuish (born 1950), English developmental psychologist
- Francis Melhuish (born 1857), English cricketer
- John Melhuish (fl. 1550s), English merchant and politician
- Sara Melhuish (1861–1939), British educationalist
