= Traylor =

Traylor is a surname. Notable people with the surname include:

- Austin Traylor (born 1993), American football player
- Bill Traylor (1853–1949), American artist
- Chet D. Traylor (born 1945), American jurist
- Craig Lamar Traylor (born 1989), American actor
- David Traylor (born 1943), English cricketer
- John H. Traylor (1839–1925), American politician, developer and mayor of Dallas 1917-1919
- Kayana Traylor (born 2001), American basketball player
- Keith Traylor (born 1969), American football nose tackle
- Melvin Alvah Traylor (1878–1934), American lawyer and banker
- Melvin Alvah Traylor, Jr. (1915–2008), American ornithologist
- Morton Traylor (1918–1996), American fine artist, designer and serigrapher
- Ray Traylor (1963–2004), American wrestler
- Robert Traylor (1977–2011), American basketball player
- Steve Traylor (born 1951), American college baseball coach
- William Traylor (1930–1989), American actor and acting coach

== See also ==
- Traylor Howard
