= Anning =

Anning may refer to:

== Places ==
- Anning, Yunnan (安宁市) city, China
- Anning District (安宁区), Lanzhou prefecture, Gansu, China

== People ==
- Anning (name)
