= Gareth Townsend =

English cricketer

Personal information
- Full name: Gareth Terence John Townsend
- Born: 28 June 1968 (age 58); Tiverton, Devon, England
- Batting: Right-handed
- Role: Batsman
- Relatives: David Townsend (brother)

Domestic team information
- Years: Team
- 1996: Minor Counties
- 1995: Surrey
- 1994–2003: Devon
- 1990–1992: Somerset
- First-class debut: 23 August 1990 Somerset v Sussex
- Last First-class: 4 August 1992 Somerset v Warwickshire
- List A debut: 3 September 1990 Somerset v Sri Lankans
- Last List A: 13 September 2001 Devon v Bedfordshire

Career statistics
Competition	First-class	List A
Matches	12	20
Runs scored	414	495
Batting average	20.70	24.75
100s/50s	–/1	–/3
Top score	53	77
Balls bowled	–	–
Wickets	–	–
Bowling average	–	–
5 wickets in innings	–	–
10 wickets in match	–	–
Best bowling	–	–
Catches/stumpings	10/–	4/–
- Source: CricketArchive, 7 April 2011

Gareth Terence John Townsend (born 28 June 1968) played first-class and List A cricket for Somerset from 1990 to 1992. He later played List A cricket for Devon, Surrey and the Minor Counties. He was born at Tiverton, Devon.

Townsend was a right-handed opening batsman. He made an impressive second eleven debut for Somerset as a 19-year-old in 1987, scoring 81 and 115 not out in the match against Hampshire 2nds. He continued to score well in second eleven matches and made his first-class debut in a couple of games in the 1990 season. He was not successful in these, but in a 55-over one-day match against the Sri Lankans he scored 77, which was to remain his highest List A score. He played a few further first-class and List A matches for Somerset in 1991 and in the first-class game against the 1991 Sri Lankans he made 53, his highest first-class score and shared a first-wicket partnership of 158 with Jimmy Cook. In 1992, he was given a greater chance in the Somerset first-team, playing in seven first-class games, but though he made useful runs he failed to reach 50 in any innings and at the end of the 1992 season his engagement with Somerset came to an end.

From 1994, Townsend started playing regularly for Devon, his native county, and appearing most seasons up to 2001 in one or two limited overs matches in the NatWest Trophy. His highest score in these games was 60 against Shropshire in 2001. In addition to matches for Devon, he also appeared for the Minor Counties representative side in the Benson and Hedges Cup and had one match for Surrey against a Young England side, all of these being limited-overs games.

As of 2012, he is the director of Surrey County Cricket Club's Academy.
