= Russell Bryan =

English cricketer

Russell Barnaby Bryan (born 14 February 1981) is an English former cricketer and current police officer. He was born in Maidstone, Kent, England. He was a right-handed batsman and a right-arm medium-fast bowler who played for Devon in List A cricket between 1999 and 2003, having also played for Middlesex in Second XI cricket.

Bryan also represented Middlesex in the Second XI trophy in 1999 and 2000.

Russell played an overseas season in Tauranga, New Zealand, for Otumoetai Cadets now the IMF Westland Cadets. He had a phenomenal season with the ball including several 5 wicket hauls. On his return he played in the C&G Trophy for Devon against Lancashire. He retired from cricket in 2004 and is now a Metropolitan Police Officer. He lives in London.
