= Robbie Newman =

English cricketer

rnew
Personal information
- Full name: Robbie James Newman
- Born: 7 March 1997 (age 29); Birmingham, Warwickshire, England
- Nickname: Bigred
- Batting: Right-handed
- Bowling: Right-arm off break

Domestic team information
- Years: Team
- 2003–2008: Devon

Career statistics
Competition	List A
Matches	1
Runs scored	–
Batting average	–
100s/50s	–/–
Top score	–
Balls bowled	60
Wickets	3
Bowling average	16.00
5 wickets in innings	–
10 wickets in match	–
Best bowling	3/48
Catches/stumpings	–/–
- Source: Cricinfo, 30 January 2011

Robbie James Newman (born 26 February 1981) is an English cricketer. Newman is a right-handed batsman who bowls right-arm off break. He was born at Birmingham, Warwickshire.

Newman made his debut for Devon in the 2003 Minor Counties Championship against Wales Minor Counties. Between 2003 and 2008, he represented the county in 13 Championship matches, the last of which came against Shropshire. In the same season he made his debut for the county, he also made his only List A appearance for them against Suffolk at The Maer Ground in the 1st round of the 2004 Cheltenham & Gloucester Trophy which was played in 2003. He took 3 wickets for the cost of 48 runs in the match.

He had to wait until the 2006 season to play in the MCCA Knockout Trophy for Devon, which he did against Dorset before playing a further Trophy match the following season against Cheshire.
