= Stadden =

Stadden is a surname. Notable people with the surname include:

- Isabelle Stadden (born 2002), American swimmer
- William Stadden (1861–1906), Welsh international rugby union player

== See also ==
- Staddon, another surname
