= John Tolliday =

English cricketer (born 1947)

John Tolliday (born 14 December 1947) was an English cricketer. He was a right-handed batsman who played for Devon. He was born in Exeter.

Tolliday, who made his Minor Counties Championship debut for the team in the 1967 season, made two List A appearances in the Gillette Cup, the first in 1978 and the second the following year.

Having scored a duck from the opening order in his debut, he was moved slightly down the order in his second match, in which he scored 10 runs.

Wilfred Rhodes Trophy 1971
