= Tom Wright (cricketer) =

English cricketer (born 1983)

Tom Wright (born 1 May 1983) was an English cricketer. He was a left-handed batsman and a right-arm medium-fast bowler who played for Devon. He was born in Barnstaple.

Wright, who made his cricketing debut in the 2000 38-County Cup, and who played for Devon in the Minor Counties Championship between 2000 and 2003, made two first-class appearances for the team, the first in the C&G Trophy in September 2002, and the second a year later. In the only innings in which he batted, he scored 6 runs.
