= Cardiff School of Sport =

Department of Cardiff Metropolitan University, Wales

- Type: Academic school department
- Established: c. 1949
- Parent institution: Cardiff Metropolitan University
- Affiliations: Cardiff School of Sport and Health Sciences
- Dean: Prof. Leigh Robinson
- Location: Cardiff, Wales
- Campus: Cyncoed
- Website: www.cardiffmet.ac.uk/schoolofsport

The Cardiff School of Sport is a department of the Cardiff School of Sport and Health Sciences at Cardiff Metropolitan University, that provides sport, physical education and dance degrees in Cardiff, Wales. The school was originally established in c. 1949, however following the merger with the Cardiff School of Health Sciences in September 2017, it became part of the Cardiff School of Sport and Health Sciences.

== Description ==
The Cardiff School of Sport is situated on the Cyncoed campus just outside Cardiff city centre. The School has international recognition and attracts students from many countries. School staff are involved in coaching, advising international sports squads, contributing to UK boards of governance in sport and are members of advisory panels that shape the future of the British sport, PE and recreation industry. Seventeen staff and former students attended the 2008 Summer Olympics and 2008 Summer Paralympics.

According to the results of the 2008 Research Assessment Exercise, 70% of the Cardiff School of Sport's research has international impact with a quarter being classified as internationally excellent or world leading. The university power rankings calculated by Research Fortnight, based on the quality and quantity of research output, places the University of Wales Institute, Cardiff as ranked 6th in the UK and 1st in Wales in Unit of Assessment 46 – Sports-Related Subjects. There were 38 institutions submitted in this subject field with UWIC returning the second largest number of research active staff.

The undergraduate programmes offer sport-related courses designed to meet current market needs. The curricula are based on mixes of theoretical studies, laboratory based work and practical workshops. Related provision at UWIC includes degrees in Sports Biomedicine and Nutrition, Dance, and Educational Studies: Sport and Physical Activity. The subjects studied and skills learnt are designed to give sport graduates the opportunity to continue their education to Master and Doctorate level; the Cardiff School of Sport offers eight pathways in its postgraduate scheme in sport studies. It also offers an MSc Sport and Exercise Medicine.

Facilities include: a Lawn Tennis Association designated I.T.I. Centre, the Wales Sports Centre for the Disabled, a sand-dressed artificial pitch, and the National Indoor Athletics Centre (NIAC). NIAC is home to The UK Athletics Talent Development Academy. UWIC is an MCC University Centre of Excellence for Cricket.

UWIC student teams, organised and administered by UWIC's Students' Union, compete in the British Universities Sports Association competition and National League competitions.

== Roll of honour ==
The UWIC Sporting Roll of Honour includes over 300 International performers from 30 different sports. The Roll includes:-
8 Captains of the Welsh Rugby Team
15 British Lions
7 National Rugby Coaches
25 Netball Internationals
International Gymnastics Coaches who produced British Internationals for every Commonwealth, European, World and Olympic Championship from 1976 to 1992
Technical Directors for GB Gymnastics, English Swimming and the England and Wales Cricket Board
National coaches for athletics, basketball and weightlifting
7 Welsh, 2 English, 1 Scottish and 1 Irish squash internationals

== Notable sporting alumni ==
- Ryan Jones
- Tanni Grey-Thompson
- Jamie Roberts
- John McFall
- Gable Garenamotse
- Tom Parsons
- Michaela Breeze
- Emma Ania

== See also ==
- Cardiff Metropolitan University RFC
- Cardiff Metropolitan University F.C.
