= Tony Allin =

English cricketer (born 1954)

Personal information
- Full name: Anthony William Allin
- Born: 20 April 1954 (age 72); Raleigh Park, Barnstaple, Devon, England
- Batting: Right-handed
- Bowling: Slow left-arm orthodox
- Role: Bowler
- Relatives: Tom Allin (son); Matthew Allin (son)

Domestic team information
- Years: Team
- 1975–1998: Devon
- 1976: Glamorgan
- 1980–1981: Minor Counties

Career statistics
Competition	FC	LA
Matches	13	19
Runs scored	108	50
Batting average	13.50	5.55
100s/50s	0/0	0/0
Top score	32	17
Balls bowled	2,001	1,150
Wickets	44	15
Bowling average	22.97	50.73
5 wickets in innings	4	0
10 wickets in match	1	–
Best bowling	8/63	3/37
Catches/stumpings	3/–	1/–
- Source: CricketArchive, 16 January 2010

Anthony William Allin (born 20 April 1954) is a former English first-class and List A cricketer who played for Glamorgan and Devon.

Allin played all his first-class matches for Glamorgan in 1976. He played List A cricket for Glamorgan, Devon and the Minor Counties. His best first-class innings figures were 8 for 63 in Glamorgan's victory over Sussex. Two weeks later he took his best match figures, 6 for 133 and 5 for 59 against Middlesex, but this time Glamorgan lost.

After one outstanding season for Glamorgan in 1976, Allin decided professional cricket was not for him, and returned to the family dairy farm in Devon. He continued to play for Devon, playing 89 matches for them in the Minor Counties Cricket Championship between 1975 and 1998. He is the father of the Warwickshire cricketer Tom Allin.

After many years as a dairy farmer, Allin successfully converted his farm near Bideford to worm-farming.
