= Aqeel Ahmed (cricketer) =

Pakistani cricketer

Personal information
- Full name: Aqeel Ahmed
- Born: 1 October 1982 (age 44); Faisalabad, Punjab, Pakistan
- Batting: Right-handed
- Bowling: Right-arm off break

Domestic team information
- Years: Team
- 2009/10–present: Faisalabad Wolves
- 2003–2004: Devon
- 2000/01–2008/09: Water and Power Development Authority
- 1999/00–present: Faisalabad
- 2010–present: Pontymister Cricket Club

Career statistics
Competition	FC	LA
Matches	51	47
Runs scored	444	60
Batting average	9.25	5.45
100s/50s	–/–	–/–
Top score	61	9
Balls bowled	9,227	2,437
Wickets	194	71
Bowling average	26.26	24.23
5 wickets in innings	14	–
10 wickets in match	5	–
Best bowling	7/98	4/12
Catches/stumpings	32/–	15/–
- Source: Cricinfo, 13 February 2011

Aqeel Ahmed (born 1 October 1982) is a Pakistani cricketer. Ahmed is a right-handed batsman who bowls right-arm off break. He was born in Faisalabad, Punjab.

Ahmed made his first-class debut for Faisalabad in the 1999–00 season against Islamabad. He followed this up by making his List A debut in the same season against the Water and Power Development Authority. Ahmed has played for a number of teams in Pakistan since making his debut, representing the Water and Power Development Authority between 2000–01 and 2008–09 and Faisalabad Wolves, who alongside the main Faisalabad team he currently represents. To date he has played 51 first-class matches and 47 List A matches. A bowler, Ahmed has taken nearly 200 wickets in first-class cricket and over 50 in List A cricket.

In 2003, he had a taste of county cricket in England when he joined Devon, playing a single List A match in the 1st round of the 2004 Cheltenham & Gloucester Trophy which was played in 2003 against Suffolk. The following season he returned to play in the 2nd round of the same competition against first-class opponents Leicestershire, which Devon famously won. Despite playing List A cricket for the county, he did not represent them in Minor counties cricket.

Ahmed Signed for South Wales club Pontymister cricket club in May 2010, in his first season took 60 wickets at an average of 12.65 and scored over 500 runs with 2 hundreds at and average of 46.09.
