= Tom Allin =

English cricketer (1987–2016)

Personal information
- Full name: Thomas William Allin
- Born: 27 November 1987; Bideford, Devon, England
- Died: 4 January 2016 (aged 28); Bideford, Devon, England
- Batting: Right-handed
- Bowling: Right-arm medium-fast
- Role: Bowler
- Relatives: Tony Allin (father); Matthew Allin (brother)

Domestic team information
- Years: Team
- 2011–2013: Warwickshire (squad no. 87)
- Only First-class: 8 May 2013 Warwickshire v Middlesex
- Only List A: 17 August 2011 Warwickshire v Surrey

Career statistics
Competition	FC	LA
Matches	1	1
Runs scored	0	2
Batting average	0.00	–
100s/50s	0/0	0/0
Top score	0	2*
Balls bowled	102	12
Wickets	0	0
Bowling average	–	–
5 wickets in innings	–	–
10 wickets in match	–	n/a
Best bowling	–	–
Catches/stumpings	0/–	0/–
- Source: CricketArchive, 18 May 2013

Thomas William Allin (27 November 1987 – 4 January 2016) was an English cricketer who played for Warwickshire County Cricket Club.

Tom Allin was a right-arm medium-fast pace bowler who also batted right-handed. He made his debut for the county in the 2011 Clydesdale Bank 40 against Surrey, and his first-class debut came against Middlesex in May 2013.

Allin suffered serious injuries in a road accident in October 2015. He gradually recovered physically, but suffered from mood swings. He died of suicide on 4 January 2016 aged 28 in Bideford, North Devon, by jumping from the A39 River Torridge Bridge.
