= Upper Shirley High School =

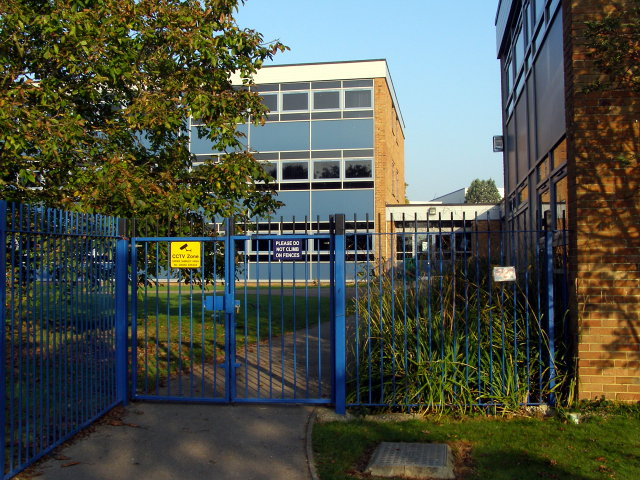

Location
- Bellemoor Road; Southampton, Hampshire, SO15 7QU; England; 50°55′46″N 1°25′25″W

Information
- Type: Academy
- Motto: Learning without limits
- Local authority: Southampton
- Department for Education URN: 137037 Tables
- Ofsted: Reports
- Headteacher: Chris Sykes
- Gender: Mixed
- Age: 11 to 16
- Enrolment: 990
- Colours: Navy blue and orange
- Former name: Bellemoor School
- Website: http://www.uppershirleyhigh.org/

Upper Shirley High School is a coeducational secondary school with academy status serving the local community of Upper Shirley in Southampton. Formerly Bellemoor School, Upper Shirley High opened under the new name in September 2008.

== Academics ==
The most recent Ofsted inspection was on 19 May 2011. In a previous inspection on 29 September 2006. The inspectors' report stated that "The school has made good progress since being subject to special measures following the last inspection in November 2004. It now provides an acceptable standard of education and, from the evidence of the significant improvements made; there is a clear capacity to continue this improvement under the direction of the headteacher and senior leadership team." In 2011, they reported that "Upper Shirley High School is a good school. Under the inspirational leadership of the principal, the school has continued on its journey of improvement. Student achievement has continued to rise in spite of the challenges presented by the move from a boys' to a mixed school".

Key stage 3 maths results now place the school in top the 25% of UK schools, and a successful start to accelerated curriculum resulted in high number of GCSE level 8 awards.

Results for GCSE students in 2007 were 41% of pupils managing to gain 5 A*-C grades, and 36% managing to gain A*-C grades in English and maths. 50% of students gained at least 5 A*-C grades including English and maths in 2008, 43% achieved this in 2009, and 47.5% in 2010. In 2012, 52% of all pupils attained five GCSEs grade A* to C including English and mathematics.

New developments will be the taking on of the British Council International Award and development of the International Baccalaureate, both of which will impact on students' learning through international pathways. Other partnerships include Johannesburg in South Africa and Gdańsk in Poland.

The feeder schools for USH are Shirley Junior School, Hollybrook Junior School and Wordsworth Primary School The catchment area for Upper Shirley High School is mostly within Shirley but also includes a bit of Bassett and Lordswood.

== Notable alumni ==
- Adrian Aymes, former Hampshire County Cricket Club wicket keeper
- Francis Benali, Southampton Football Club defender
- Chris Ship, ITV Royal Editor
- Craig David, R&B singer
- Billy Morgan, snowboarder
