= Christopher Edwards (cricketer) =

English cricketer

Christopher Edwards (born 18 May 1958) was an English cricketer. He was a left-handed batsman who played for Devon. He was born in Torquay.

Edwards, who represented the side in the Minor Counties Championship and Minor Counties Trophy between 1982 and 1986, made a single List A appearance for the side, during the 1985 NatWest Trophy, against Warwickshire. From the lower-middle order, he scored 5 runs.

Edwards' brother, Hiley, also played List A cricket, and was Devon's captain between 1985 and 1991.
