= Matthew Allin =

English cricketer (1978–2024)

Personal information
- Full name: Matthew Lee Allin
- Born: 23 September 1978; Bideford, Devon, England
- Died: 28 November 2024 (aged 46); Exeter, Devon, England
- Batting: Right-handed
- Role: Wicket-keeper
- Relatives: Tony Allin (father); Tom Allin (brother)

Domestic team information
- Years: Team
- 2002–2003: Devon

Career statistics
Competition	LA
Matches	2
Runs scored	23
Batting average	23
100s/50s	0/0
Top score	19
Catches/stumpings	3/1
- Source: Cricinfo, 6 August 2008

Matthew Lee Allin (23 September 1978 – 28 November 2024) was an English cricketer. He was a right-handed batsman and wicket-keeper who played for Devon.

Allin was born in Bideford. He made two appearances for Devon in the Cheltenham & Gloucester Trophy competition, the first game in September 2002 and the second in May 2003. He scored 23 runs and made three catches and one stumping. Allin died in Exeter, Devon on 28 November 2024, at the age of 46.
