= Edwin Picton =

English cricketer

Personal information
- Full name: Edwin Philip Picton
- Born: 23 August 1949 (age 77); Blackpool, Lancashire, England
- Batting: Left-handed

Domestic team information
- Years: Team
- 1978–1984: Devon

Career statistics
| Competition | List A |
|---|---|
| Matches | 3 |
| Runs scored | 21 |
| Batting average | 10.50 |
| 100s/50s | –/– |
| Top score | 17 |
| Balls bowled | – |
| Wickets | – |
| Bowling average | – |
| 5 wickets in innings | – |
| 10 wickets in match | – |
| Best bowling | – |
| Catches/stumpings | –/– |
- Source: Cricinfo, 6 February 2011

Edwin Philip Picton (born 23 August 1949) is a former English cricketer. Picton was a left-handed batsman. He was born in Blackpool, Lancashire.

After playing age group cricket in Lancashire, Picton later represented the Lancashire Second XI in the Minor Counties Championship, making his debut for the team in 1967 against Durham. He represented the Second XI in both the Minor Counties Championship and the Second XI Championship until 1973. Picton never represented the senior Lancashire team. Moving to Devon, he later made his debut for Devon in the 1978 Minor Counties Championship against Cornwall. Picton represented the county until 1979, playing 13 Championship matches in that time. In 1979, he made his debut in List A cricket in the 1979 Gillette Cup against Leicestershire. The following season he played two further List A matches in the 1980 Gillette Cup against Cornwall and in the following round, Warwickshire. In those 3 List A matches, he scored 21 runs at a batting average of 10.50, with a high score of 17. Five seasons after his final Minor Counties Championship match, Picton returned to play a final match for Devon in the 1984 Minor Counties Championship against the Somerset Second XI.
