= Richard Turpin (cricketer) =

English cricketer

Personal information
- Full name: Richard Charles Turpin
- Born: 5 May 1967 (age 59); Solihull, Warwickshire, England
- Batting: Right-handed
- Role: Wicket-keeper

Domestic team information
- Years: Team
- 1984–1990: Devon

Career statistics
Competition	List A
Matches	4
Runs scored	59
Batting average	19.66
100s/50s	0/0
Top score	29*
Catches/stumpings	2/0
- Source: Cricinfo, 30 December 2010

Richard Charles Turpin (born 5 May 1967) is an English former cricketer. Turpin was a right-handed batsman who played as a wicket-keeper. He was born at Solihull, Warwickshire.

Turpin made his debut for Devon in the 1984 Minor Counties Championship against Oxfordshire. From 1984 to 1990, he represented the county in 29 Championship matches, the last of which came against Cornwall. His MCCA Knockout Trophy debut for the county came against Oxfordshire in 1984. From 1984 to 1990, he represented the county in 7 Trophy matches, the last of which came against Lincolnshire.

He also represented Devon in List A cricket. His debut List A match came against Nottinghamshire in the 1986 NatWest Trophy. From 1986 to 1990, he represented the county in 4 List A matches, the last of which came against Somerset in the 1990 NatWest Trophy. In his 4 matches, he scored 59 runs at a batting average of 19.66, with a high score of 29*. Behind the stumps he took 2 catches.
