= Robert Staddon =

Robert Staddon may refer to:

- Robert Staddon (English sportsman) (born 1944), English cricketer and rugby union footballer
- Robert Staddon (swimmer) (born 1960), Australian Paralympic swimmer
