= Hiley Edwards =

English cricketer

Personal information
- Full name: John Hiley Edwards
- Born: 10 March 1951; Newton Abbot, Devon, England
- Died: 8 November 2009 (aged 58); Torquay, Devon, England
- Batting: Left-handed
- Relatives: Christopher Edwards (brother)

Domestic team information
- Years: Team
- 1974–1991: Devon

Career statistics
Competition	List A
Matches	6
Runs scored	52
Batting average	10.40
100s/50s	–/–
Top score	22*
Balls bowled	6
Wickets	–
Bowling average	–
5 wickets in innings	–
10 wickets in match	–
Best bowling	–
Catches/stumpings	2/–
- Source: Cricinfo, 6 February 2011

John Hiley Edwards (10 March 1951 – 8 November 2009) was an English cricketer. Edwards was a left-handed batsman. He played for and later captained Devon County Cricket Club, leading the county to their first cup final at Lord's in 1991.

== Early life ==
Edwards was born at Newton Abbot, Devon. He was educated at Watcombe County Primary School before starting his secondary education at Torquay Boys' Grammar School. At school he was a junior table tennis champion. He learnt his cricket at local club Cockington Corinthians Cricket Club in 1965, before moving to Torquay Cricket Club, who he spent 17 seasons with, scoring over 16,000 runs in the process.

== County career ==
In 1974, Edwards made his debut for Devon against the Somerset Second XI in the Minor Counties Championship. This marked the start of an 18-year association with the county.

Throughout the course of his career with Devon, Edwards played 86 Minor Counties Championship matches, scoring nearly 2,700 runs. His final Championship match came in 1991 against Cheshire. In 1984, Edwards played his first MCCA Knockout Trophy match, in what was the tournaments inaugural season, against Cornwall. From 1984 to 1991, he represented the county in 17 Trophy matches, the last of which came against Staffordshire in the final of the 1991 MCCA Trophy at Lord's which Devon lost by 4 wickets.

As well as playing Minor counties cricket for Devon, Edwards also appeared in List A cricket for them when the county was permitted to take part in the domestic one-day competition which involved the first-class counties. His List A debut came against Warwickshire in the 1st round of the 1985 NatWest Trophy. From 1985 to 1991, he represented the county in 6 List A matches, the last of which came against Essex. In the 6 List A match he played, he scored 52 runs at a batting average of 10.40, with a high score of 22*. Edwards captained Devon between 1985 and 1991, being replaced the following season by Nick Folland. He continued to play club cricket for Paignton Cricket Club, until hanging up his gloves in 1995.

== Outside cricket ==
When not playing for Devon, Edwards worked his entire life in the travel industry. He started working for Renwicks Group based in Paignton and later worked for Lunn Poly, where he became a regional manager. Edwards played rugby union at amateur level for Torquay RFC, Newton Abbot RFC and Totnes RFC. He also played football at an amateur level for St Marychurch Spurs and Sunday pub side Coombe Cellars F.C.

== Later life ==
In 1997, Edwards was diagnosed with a brain tumor, which led to a gradual decline in his health. On 8 November 2009 he succumbed to disease following a sudden decline in his health. He was survived by his wife of 33 years and his two sons, one of whom played Minor Counties cricket for Devon in 2002. He was also survived by his brothers, Christopher, who also played List A cricket for Devon, and Paul, who played semi-professional football for Bideford. Edwards' funeral took place at Upton Vale Baptist Church in Torquay.
