= Bob Harriott =

English cricketer

Personal information
- Full name: Robert Frank Harriott
- Born: 30 November 1947 (age 78); Birmingham, Warwickshire, England
- Batting: Right-handed

Domestic team information
- Years: Team
- 1971–1986: Devon

Career statistics
Competition	List A
Matches	4
Runs scored	58
Batting average	19.33
100s/50s	–/–
Top score	27*
Balls bowled	–
Wickets	–
Bowling average	–
5 wickets in innings	–
10 wickets in match	–
Best bowling	–
Catches/stumpings	–/–
- Source: Cricinfo, 12 February 2011

Robert 'Bob' Frank Harriott (born 30 November 1947) is a former English cricketer. Harriott was a right-handed batsman. He was born in Birmingham, Warwickshire.

Harriott made his debut for Devon in the 1971 Minor Counties Championship against Oxfordshire. From 1971 to 1986, he represented the county in 85 Championship matches, the last of which came against Cornwall. Harriott also played List A cricket for Devon at a time when they were permitted to take part in the domestic one-day competition, making his debut in that format against Staffordshire in the 1978 Gillette Cup. He played 3 further List A matches for Devon between 1978 and 1980, the last if which came against Warwickshire in the 1980 Gillette Cup. In his 4 List A matches, he scored 58 runs at a batting average of 19.33, with a high score of 27*.
