= Martin Taylor (cricketer) =

English cricketer (born 1957)

Martin Taylor (born 10 April 1957) was an English cricketer. He was a left-handed batsman and a left-arm medium-pace bowler who played for Devon. He was born in Liverpool.

He played for Devon in the Minor Counties Championship from 1981 to 1987. Taylor made two appearances for the team in the NatWest Trophy, the first in 1984 and the second in 1987. He scored 12 runs in the first match and 5 runs in the second.
