= Derek Cole =

English cricketer

Personal information
- Full name: Derek Henry Cole
- Born: 9 March 1925; Dawlish, Devon, England
- Died: 7 April 2006 (aged 81); Chippenham, Wiltshire, England
- Height: 6 ft 4 in (1.93 m)
- Batting: Right-handed
- Bowling: Right-arm off break Right-arm fast-medium

Domestic team information
- Years: Team
- 1959–1967: Minor Counties
- 1947–1970: Devon

Career statistics
Competition	First-class	List A
Matches	3	1
Runs scored	86	1
Batting average	21.50	1.00
100s/50s	–/–	–/–
Top score	36	1
Balls bowled	162	72
Wickets	2	1
Bowling average	41.00	25.00
5 wickets in innings	–	–
10 wickets in match	–	–
Best bowling	1/11	1/25
Catches/stumpings	1/–	2/–
- Source: Cricinfo, 11 February 2011

Derek Henry Cole (9 March 1925 – 7 April 2006) was an English cricketer. Cole was a right-handed batsman who bowled both right-arm off break and right-arm fast-medium. He was born in Dawlish, Devon.

== Cricket career ==
Cole made his debut for Devon in the 1947 Minor Counties Championship against the Surrey Second XI. From 1947 to 1970, he represented the county in 186 Championship matches, the last of which came against Cornwall. He played a single List A match for the county against Hertfordshire in the 1969 Gillette Cup. In this match he scored a single run before being dismissed by Roy Wacey. With the ball he took a single wicket at a cost of 25 runs. Cole captained Devon in this match and in Minor counties cricket.

Cole made a number of appearances in first-class cricket during his career. The first came for the South in the North v South fixture of 1956. His next two first-class appearances came for the combined Minor Counties cricket team against the touring Indians in 1959 and against eight years later against the touring Pakistanis. Cole captained the side in the 1967 fixture. In his 3 first-class matches he scored 86 runs at a batting average of 21.50, with a high score of 36. With the ball he took 2 wickets at a bowling average of 41.00, with best figures of 1/11.

== Personal life ==
He was educated at Teignmouth Grammar School, later returning to the school as a teacher. He was the president of Devon County Cricket Club from 1974 to 1996. He died in Chippenham, Wiltshire on 7 April 2006.
