= Anning (name) =

Anning is both a surname and a masculine given name. Notable people with the name include:

Surname:

- Anning (surname)

Given name:

- Anning Smith Prall (1870–1937), American politician
