= Folland (disambiguation) =

Folland may refer to:

- Folland (surname), an English-language surname
- Folland Aircraft, a British aviation manufacturer, later merged into Hawker-Siddeley
- Folland Sports F.C., Hamble-le-Rice, Hampshire, England, UK; a soccer team
- Folland Park, Enfield, South Australia, Australia; a park
