= Johnny Rhodes =

Johnny Rhodes may refer to:

- Johnny Rhodes (rugby league) (born 1947), Australian rugby league footballer
- Johnny Rhodes (basketball), American basketball player in Maryland Terrapins men's basketball
- Johnny Rhodes, presenter on KGRR

== See also ==
- John Rhodes (disambiguation)
