= Andrew Hele =

English cricketer

Personal information
- Full name: Andrew Keith Hele
- Born: 3 September 1967 (age 59); Exeter, Devon, England
- Batting: Right-handed
- Role: Wicket-keeper
- Relatives: Sonny Baker (nephew)

Domestic team information
- Years: Team
- 1997–2004: Devon

Career statistics
| Competition | List A |
|---|---|
| Matches | 6 |
| Runs scored | 40 |
| Batting average | 13.33 |
| 100s/50s | –/– |
| Top score | 19 |
| Catches/stumpings | 8/2 |
- Source: Cricinfo, 6 February 2011

Andrew Keith Hele (born 3 September 1967) is a former English cricketer. Hele was a right-handed batsman who fielded primarily as a wicket-keeper. He was born in Torquay, Devon.

Hele made his debut for Devon in 1997 against Berkshire in the Minor Counties Championship. From 1997 to 2001, he represented Devon in 28 Championship matches, the last of which came against Cheshire. In 1998, he made his debut MCCA Knockout Trophy appearance for the county against Dorset. From 1998 to 2004, he represented the county in 20 Trophy matches, the last of which came against Suffolk. In the same season as he made his MCCA Knockout Trophy debut, Hele also made his List A debut for Devon against Yorkshire in the 1st round of the 1998 NatWest Trophy. From 1998 to 2001, he played in 6 List A matches, the last of which came against Shropshire in the 1st round of the 2001 Cheltenham & Gloucester Trophy. In his 6 List A matches, he scored 40 runs at a batting average of 13.33, with a high score of 19. Behind the stumps he took 8 catches and made 2 stumpings.
