= Times Higher Education University of the Year =

Annual award for higher education institutions

THE University of the Year
- Awarded for: Recognition in Higher Education
- Country: United Kingdom and Ireland
- Presented by: Times Higher Education
- First award: 2005; 21 years ago
- Currently held by: Teesside University
- Website: www.the-awards.co.uk

The THE University of the Year is an annual award given to an Irish or British university or other higher education institution by Times Higher Education. The current University of the Year for 2025 is Teesside University.

The annual award was established in 2005, with shortlisted universities announced in September and winners announced in a ceremony in October/November. The winner is chosen by a panel of judges including the editor of the publication, senior university administrators, and senior members of research and funding councils.

Although similar in name, this award has no connection to the Sunday Times University of the Year award given by The Times.

== List of winners ==
Year	Winner	Shortlisted
2025	Teesside University	University of East London; Heriot-Watt University; University of Hertfordshire; Queen Mary University of London; University of Worcester
2024	Ulster University	London Metropolitan University; University of Leicester; University of Stirling; University of Sunderland; University of Surrey
2023	Anglia Ruskin University	University of East London; University of Exeter; Liverpool School of Tropical Medicine; University of South Wales; University of York
2022	Northumbria University	Edinburgh Napier University; Loughborough University; Newcastle University; University of Plymouth; Sheffield Hallam University
2021	Cardiff Metropolitan University	Aston University; London School of Hygiene and Tropical Medicine; The Open University; University of Sunderland; University of York
2020	University of Glasgow	Edge Hill University; Keele University; The Open University; Staffordshire University; University of Worcester
2019	University of Strathclyde	University of Derby; Harper Adams University; Solent University; Ulster University; University of Worcester
2018	University of Essex	Keele University; Newcastle University; Swansea University; University of West London; University of York
2017	Nottingham Trent University	City, University of London; University of Dundee; Liverpool John Moores University; Northumbria University; University of Winchester
2016	London School of Hygiene and Tropical Medicine	Abertay University; City, University of London; Loughborough University; University of Nottingham; University of Worcester
2015	Coventry University	University of Glasgow; University of Kent; Lancaster University; Loughborough University; The Open University
2014	Edge Hill University	Birkbeck, University of London; University of Glasgow; Harper Adams University; Institute of Education, University of London; Swansea University
2013	University of Huddersfield	University of Birmingham; University of East Anglia; Newcastle University; University of Northampton; York St John University
2012	University of Strathclyde	Brunel University; University of Exeter; University of Nottingham; Plymouth University; University of Sunderland
2011	University of Sheffield	University of Dundee; Edge Hill University; University of Nottingham; University of Southampton; University of Sussex
2010	University of York	Birkbeck, University of London; Edge Hill University; Lancaster University; Newcastle University
2009	Teesside University	Bournemouth University; University of Nottingham; Queen Mary, University of London; University of Warwick; University of Winchester
2008	University of Leicester	
2007	University of Exeter	
2006	University of Nottingham	
2005	University of Manchester	

=== Universities with multiple wins and shortlists ===
Universities with 3+ Shortlists
University	Shortlists
Newcastle University	4
University of Nottingham	4
University of Worcester	4
Edge Hill University	3
Loughborough University	3
The Open University	3
University of Sunderland	3
University of York	3

Universities with 2+ Wins
University	Wins
University of Strathclyde	2
