= David Townsend (Devon cricketer) =

English cricketer (born 1965)

Personal information
- Full name: David Edward John Townsend
- Born: 22 October 1965 (age 61); Tiverton, Devon, England
- Batting: Right-handed
- Bowling: Right-arm medium
- Relatives: Gareth Townsend (brother)

Domestic team information
- Years: Team
- 1993–2002: Devon

Career statistics
Competition	LA
Matches	1
Runs scored	29
Batting average	29.00
100s/50s	–/–
Top score	29
Balls bowled	–
Wickets	–
Bowling average	–
5 wickets in innings	–
10 wickets in match	–
Best bowling	–
Catches/stumpings	–/–
- Source: Cricinfo, 30 December 2010

David Edward John Townsend (born 26 October 1965) is a former English cricketer. Townsend was a right-handed batsman who bowled right-arm medium pace. He was born at Tiverton, Devon.

Townsend made his debut for Devon in the 1993 Minor Counties Championship against Wiltshire. From 1993 to 2002, he represented the county in 10 Championship matches, the last of which came against Oxfordshire. His MCCA Knockout Trophy debut for the county came against Dorset in 1993. He played one further Trophy match for Devon, which came in 2002 against Wiltshire.

He also represented Devon in a single List A match against Derbyshire in the 1993 NatWest Trophy. In this match, he scored 29 runs before being bowled by Matthew Vandrau.

His younger brother, Gareth, played first-class cricket for Somerset. He also played List A cricket for Surrey, Devon and a combined Minor Counties team.
