= Teignmouth Community School =

Location
- Exeter Road, Teignmouth, Devon, TQ14 9HZ. Teignmouth, Devon, TQ14 9HZ; England; 50.5505°N 3.5002°W

Information
- Type: Academy
- Motto: Carpé Diem
- Local authority: Devon County Council
- Trust: Osprey Learning Trust
- Department for Education URN: 136495 Tables
- Ofsted: Reports
- Chair of trust: Tony Smith
- Head teacher: Rachel Wickham
- Gender: Coeducational
- Age: 3 to 18
- Enrolment: 942
- Website: http://www.teignmouth.devon.sch.uk/

Teignmouth Community School is coeducational primary and secondary school located over two sites in Teignmouth in the English county of Devon.

== History ==
=== Primary department ===
The primary department of the school is located on Mill Lane in Teignmouth.

It was previously known as Inverteign Community Nursery and Primary School, and was administered as a community school by Devon County Council.

In March 2011 the school converted to academy status as part of the Osprey Learning Trust. The school was then renamed Teignmouth Community School. While legally separate from the secondary department, both schools are administered by the Osprey Learning Trust and share facilities and support staff.

=== Secondary department ===
The secondary department of the school is located on Exeter Road in Teignmouth. The site had previously been the Everest Officers' Hospital, a World War I military hospital. It resulted from the 1979 merger of two earlier schools, Teignmouth Grammar School and Teignmouth Secondary Modern, into Teignmouth High School.

From a peak student population in 1980, year numbers gradually declined and many temporary and duplicated structures were closed and demolished.

In the late 1980s the name was changed to Teignmouth Community College.

The college became a specialist in maths and computing in 2004. A February 2010 Ofsted inspection report allocated the school an overall Grade 2 (Good) for its performance, with a Grade 1 (outstanding) on some points.

In March 2011 the school converted to academy status as part of the Osprey Learning Trust. The school was then renamed Teignmouth Community School. While legally separate from the primary department, both schools are administered by the Osprey Learning Trust and share facilities and support staff.

As well as the primary department of the school, feeder primary schools in the area include Our Lady and St Patricks RC primary school, Hazeldown Primary, Inverteign community nursery and primary school, Bishopsteignton primary school, Stokeinteignhead and Shaldon primary schools.

== Curriculum ==
Core subjects follow the National Curriculum with sixth form pupils following A-level, AS-level and BTEC courses. The college also offers vocational courses including NVQs in hairdressing and BTEC Diplomas in courses such as health and social care, information technology, travel and tourism, horticulture, construction and mechanics as well as many GCSE, A level and AS courses. Students from nearby Teign School also attend the college's vocational programmes.

== Notable former pupils ==
- Matt Bellamy, lead singer, guitarist and pianist of rock group Muse
- John Bainbridge, author and countryside campaigner
- Derek Cole, cricketer
- Dominic Howard, drummer, Muse
- Chris Wolstenholme, bassist, Muse
- Laura Rossi, composer
