= Barrie Matthews =

English cricketer

Personal information
- Full name: Barrie Lloyd Matthews
- Born: 4 August 1943 (age 83); Ashburton, Devon, England
- Batting: Right-handed

Domestic team information
- Years: Team
- 1965–1984: Devon
- 1974: Minor Counties South

Career statistics
Competition	List A
Matches	8
Runs scored	125
Batting average	15.62
100s/50s	–/1
Top score	66
Catches/stumpings	4/–
- Source: Cricinfo, 6 February 2011

Barrie Lloyd Matthews (born 4 August 1943) is a former English cricketer. Matthews was a right-handed batsman. He was born in Ashburton, Devon.

== Minor Counties cricket ==
Matthews made his debut for Devon in 1965 against the Somerset Second XI in the Minor Counties Championship. From 1965 to 1984, he represented Devon in 135 Championship matches, the last of which came against the Somerset Second XI. In 1983, he made his debut in the MCCA Knockout Trophy for the county against Buckinghamshire. From 1983 to 1984, he represented the county in 2 further Trophy matches against Cornwall and Oxfordshire. He captained Devon between 1973 and 1984, before handing the captaincy to Hiley Edwards following his retirement. During his time playing for Devon, he amassed over 5,000 runs.

== List A cricket ==
Matthews' List A debut for Devon came against Hertfordshire in the 1st round of the 1969 Gillette Cup. From 1969 to 1984, he played in 7 List A matches for Devon, the last of which came against Sussex in the 1st round of the 1984 NatWest Trophy. In his 7 List A matches for Devon, he scored 119 runs at a batting average of 17.00, with a single half century high score of 66. In 1974, he was selected to represent Minor Counties South in the 1974 Benson & Hedges Cup. He played a single match in the competition for team, against Somerset. He scored 6 runs in the match before being dismissed by Tom Cartwright.

== Personal life ==
Outside of the county game, he played club cricket for Torquay Cricket Club, for whom he scored over 30,000 runs. Matthews currently lives in the Province of Alicante in southern Spain. In November 2010 he represented the Spain Over-60s cricket team. He has recently published a book about his life around cricket for Torquay Cricket Club and Devon County Cricket Club entitled Memories from the Pavilion Bar. It is available at Torquay Cricket pavilion priced at 4.99. All proceeds going to Torquay Cricket Club funds.
