= Anning (surname) =

Anning is a surname, and may refer to:

- Amber Anning (born 2000), British runner
- Fraser Anning (born 1949), Australian politician
- Les Anning (1927–2008), Canadian ice hockey player
- Mary Anning (1799–1847), British fossil collector, paleontologist and dealer
- Norman H. Anning (1883–1963), American mathematician and academic
- Raymon Anning (1930–2020), Hong Kong police commissioner
- Sam Anning, Australian jazz bassist
- Trevor Anning (born 1982), English cricketer
