= Zero2Five Food Industry Centre =

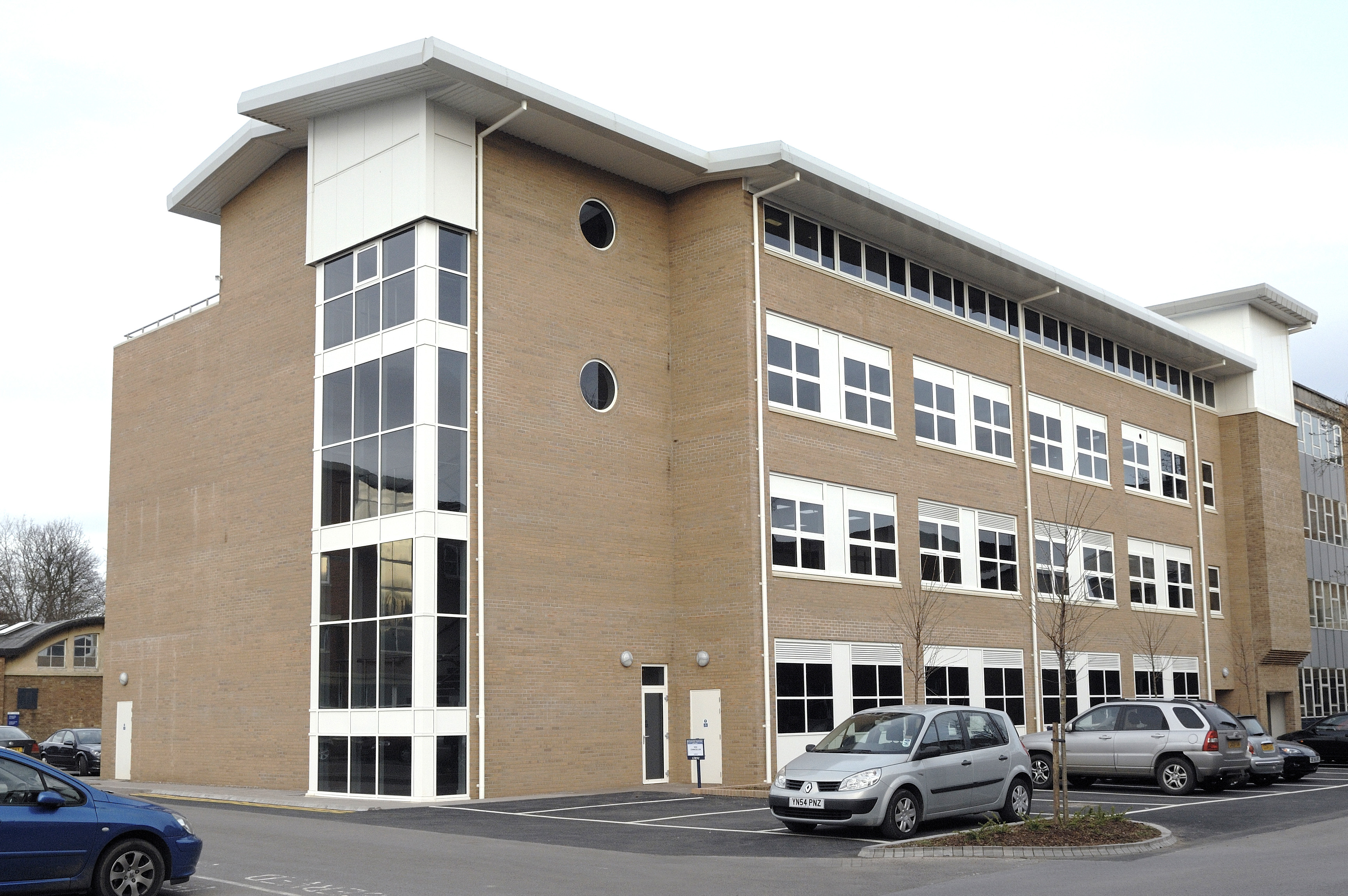
- Interactive map of the Zero2Five Food Industry Centre area

General information
- Type: Research Centre
- Location: Cardiff Metropolitan University, Llandaff Campus, Western Avenue, Cardiff, Wales
- Coordinates: 51.496°N 3.212°W
- Construction started: 2007
- Completed: 2009

Design and construction
- Main contractor: Willmott Dixon

The Zero2Five Food Industry Centre at Cardiff Metropolitan University is a Welsh research and education organisation designed to address issues of food safety and food-related health concerns. Its mission also includes supporting the Welsh food industry. The centre, which is part of the School of Sport and Health Sciences at the university's Llandaff campus, was launched in 1999. A new facility for the centre opened on 21 April 2009 and was built at a cost of £5,000,000.
