= Neil Folland =

English cricketer

Neil Geoffrey Folland (born 27 June 1960) is an English former cricketer. He played as a right-handed batsman and was born in Bristol.

Folland made his List A debut for Devon County Cricket Club in 1986, scoring 30 runs and represented the team in the Minor Counties Championship between 1985 and 1988. He joined Bedfordshire in 1990, for whom he played in the Minor Counties Championship until 1994. He made a single List A appearance for Bedfordshire, in the 1991 NatWest Trophy, against Worcestershire, scoring 10 runs.

His brother, Nick Folland, played first-class cricket for Somerset as well as List A and Minor Counties cricket for Devon.
