= Kevin Barrett (cricketer) =

Welsh cricketer

Kevin Andrew Owen Barrett (born 16 November 1975) is a former Welsh cricketer. Born in Swansea, he was a left-handed batsman and right-arm medium-pace bowler who played for Devon.

Barrett studied at Millfield School and Durham University. He played for the Second XIs of Essex, Surrey, and Somerset between 1995 and 2000. This included spending two seasons (1999 and 2000) on the Surrey C.C.C. playing staff.

Barrett's debut List A appearance came in the 1998 NatWest Trophy against Yorkshire, against whom he scored three runs.

Barrett made his second and final List A appearance four years later, in the 2002 Cheltenham & Gloucester Trophy, again facing Yorkshire, in which he scored 6 runs.
