= Kieran Crawford =

Welsh rugby union player

Kieran Crawford (born 13 July 1983) is a Welsh rugby union player. He played his club rugby for Bedwas RFC.

After spending 5 seasons at the Welsh regional side Newport Gwent Dragons, Crawford was released from his contract at the end of the 2007–08 season after making 30 appearances. Crawford went on to join Welsh Premiership side Cardiff RFC, helping the team to secure the league title during the 2008–09 season.

Crawford joined Welsh Premiership rivals Bedwas RFC at the start of the 2009–10 season. Following a successful first season with his new club, it was announced that Crawford would captain Bedwas RFC for the 2010–11 season.
