= Christopher Melhuish =

English cricketer (born 1955)

Christopher Melhuish (born 6 January 1955) was an English cricketer. He was a right-handed batsman who played for Devon. He was born in Exeter.

Melhuish, who played for Devon in the Minor Counties Championship between 1981 and 1986, made a single List A appearance for the team, during the 1983 NatWest Trophy. From the upper-middle order, he scored 4 runs.
