= Robert Staddon (English sportsman) =

English cricketer and rugby union footballer

Robert Staddon (born 11 December 1944 (age 80)) was an English cricketer and rugby union footballer. He played cricket for Devon and rugby for Devon and Exeter. He was born in Exeter.

Staddon made a single List A cricketing appearance, in the 1969 Gillette Cup, against Hertfordshire. As an opener, he scored a single run in the only List A innings in which he batted.

Staddon represented Devon in the Minor Counties Championship between 1967 and 1976.
