= National Indoor Athletics Centre =

Indoor sports venue in Cardiff, Wales

Coordinates: 51.510°N 3.162°W

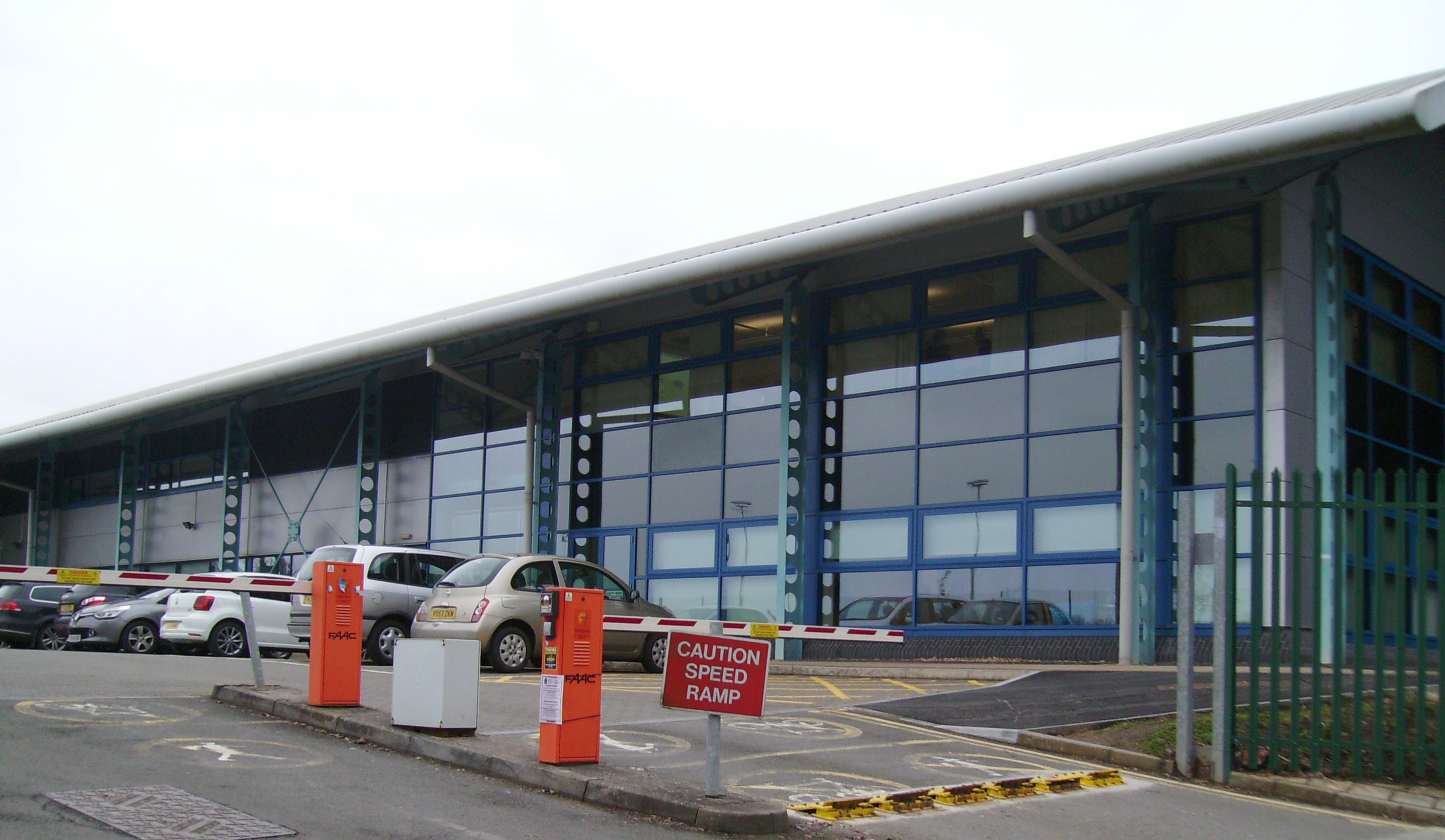
National Indoor Athletics Centre

The National Indoor Athletics Centre is an indoor track and field athletics sports venue in the Cyncoed area of Cardiff, Wales. It is sited on the Cardiff Metropolitan University Campus and is one of the main facilities used by Welsh Athletics, which organises the Cardiff branch of the Athletics Development Centre at the National Indoor Athletics Centre.

== Facilities ==
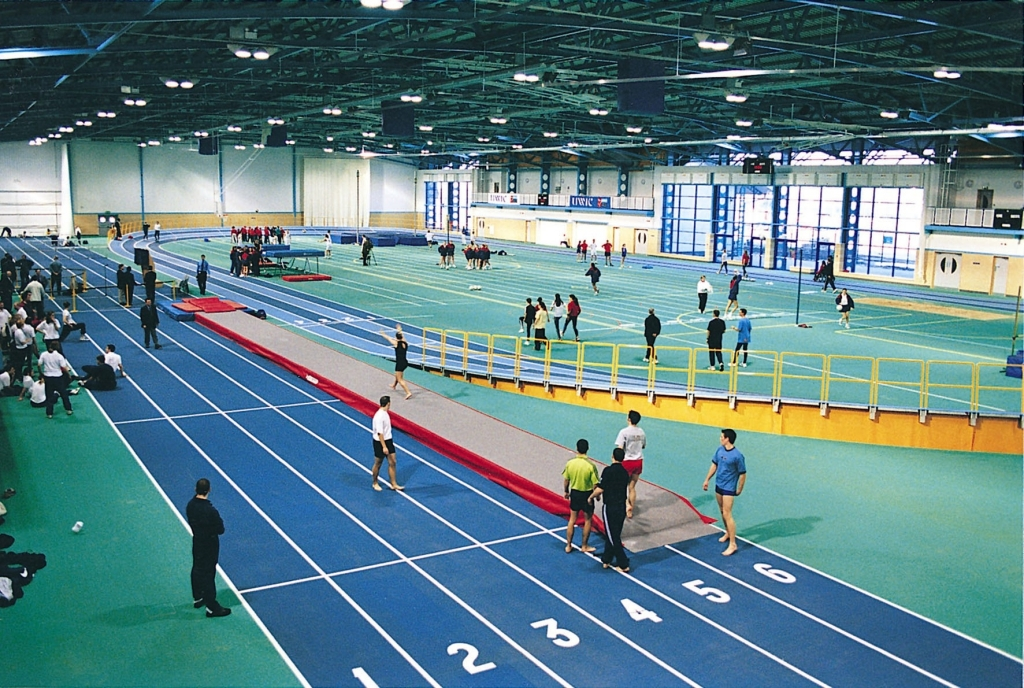
Inside the National Indoor Athletics Centre

The track facilities include:

- 200m, 4 lane banked track
- 60m, 8 lane straight track
- 120m, 6 lane straight track which finishes outside the main arena

The National Indoor Athletics Centre (NIAC) at Cardiff Metropolitan University's Cyncoed campus was officially opened on January 27, 2000, by Colin Jackson, Jamie Baulch, and the Mayor of Cardiff. As the UK's first purpose-built indoor athletics track.

The development of the National Indoor Athletics Centre (NIAC) at Cardiff Metropolitan University (formerly UWIC) was primarily led by Sean Power. Key parties responsible for its creation and oversight include: Project Leadership: In the late 1990s, Sean Power, then Associate Dean in the Faculty of Education and Sport, headed the team responsible for developing both the indoor centre and the floodlit 8-lane outdoor track. Funding: The project cost approximately £7 million and was largely funded by a £5.6 million grant from the Sports Council for Wales' SPORTLOT Fund. It was the largest lottery-funded project in Wales at the time. Design & Architecture: The architectural firm Austin-Smith:Lord was responsible for more recent extensions to the facility. Ownership: The facility is owned and operated by Cardiff Metropolitan University.

== See also ==
- Sport in Cardiff
