= Sunday Times University of the Year =

University of the Year
- Awarded for: Recognition in Higher Education
- Country: United Kingdom
- Presented by: The Times and The Sunday Times
- First award: 1999; 27 years ago
- Currently held by: Durham University
- Website: www.thetimes.com/uk-university-rankings

The Sunday Times University of the Year is an annual award given to a British university or other higher education institution by The Sunday Times. The current University of the Year for 2027 is Imperial College London.

The award is given as part of the annual Times and Sunday Times University Guide since the second supplement's second edition in 1999. Though the guide contains a league table of UK universities compiled from various statistics, the award is not necessarily given to the university at the top (in fact, it only has been in 2007, 2010 and 2025). Instead, a university is chosen by a panel of experts based on all round academic excellence.

In addition to the winner, shortlisted universities are also named. A runners-up position was introduced in 2006.

From 2009 onwards, the University Guide took the year of its name from the following year (so the guide published in 2009 is known as 2010, the guide published in 2010 is known as 2011 etc.)

Although similar in name, this award has no connection to the "University of the Year" award given by Times Higher Education.

== List of winners ==
| Year | Winner | Runner-up | Also shortlisted |
|---|---|---|---|
| 2027 | Imperial College London | University of Birmingham | |
| 2026 | Durham University | University of Strathclyde | University of Bath; University of Birmingham |
| 2025 | London School of Economics and Political Science | University of Sheffield | Durham University; University of Leicester; University of Warwick |
| 2024 | University College London | University of Exeter | University of Buckingham; University of Liverpool; London School of Economics and Political Science; University of York |
| 2023 | University of Bath | University of Exeter | University of Birmingham; University of Oxford; University of Surrey |
| 2022 | Imperial College London | University of Warwick | Edge Hill University; Ulster University; University of York |
| 2021 | University of Oxford | Queen Mary, University of London | University of Bath; Coventry University; University of Strathclyde |
| 2020 | University of St Andrews | Harper Adams University | London School of Economics and Political Science; Royal Holloway, University of London; Staffordshire University |
| 2019 | Loughborough University | Swansea University | University of Aberdeen; University of Nottingham; University of St Andrews |
| 2018 | Lancaster University | Loughborough University | University of Essex; University of Glasgow; University of Nottingham |
| 2017 | University of Leeds | University of St Andrews | University of Dundee |
| 2016 | University of Surrey | University of Leeds | Durham University; Imperial College London; University of Kent |
| 2015 | University of Warwick | University of Leeds | Coventry University; Loughborough University; University of St Andrews |
| 2014 | University of Birmingham | University of Leicester | Coventry University; University of St Andrews; University of Surrey |
| 2013 | University of Exeter | University of Leicester | Plymouth University |
| 2012 | University of Bath | University of Exeter | University of Leeds; The Robert Gordon University; University of Surrey |
| 2011 | King's College London | University of Nottingham | Edge Hill University; University of Exeter; London School of Economics and Political Science; Oxford Brookes University |
| 2010 (Published 2009) | University of Oxford | University College London | University of Birmingham; Edge Hill University; University of Glasgow; University of Stirling |
| 2009 | Change in name to represent forthcoming year. | | |
| 2008 | Loughborough University | Imperial College London | Aston University; University of Sheffield; University of Southampton |
| 2007 | University of Cambridge | University of St Andrews | Edge Hill University; Harper Adams University College; University of Leicester; Queen's University Belfast |
| 2006 | University of Manchester | University of Exeter | King's College London; Lancaster University; University of St Andrews |
| 2005 | Durham University | | University of Bath; University of East Anglia; University of Hull; Loughborough University |
| 2004 | University College London | | University of Dundee; Durham University; Kingston University; University of Manchester |
| 2003 | University of York | | Cardiff University; University of Exeter; Loughborough University; Oxford Brookes University |
| 2002 | University of St Andrews | | The London Institute; University of Plymouth; University of Southampton; University of Warwick |
| 2001 | University of Sheffield | | University of Exeter; The London Institute; Oxford Brookes University; University of Ulster; University of Warwick |
| 2000 | University of Newcastle upon Tyne | | University of Bath; Kingston University; University of Nottingham; University of York |
| 1999 | University of Brighton | | University of Bristol; Loughborough University; University of Northumbria at Newcastle |

=== Universities with multiple appearances ===
Universities with 3+ Shortlists
| University | Shortlists |
|---|---|
| University of Bath | 4 |
| Edge Hill University | 4 |
| University of St Andrews | 4 |
| University of Birmingham | 3 |
| Coventry University | 3 |
| Durham University | 3 |
| University of Exeter | 3 |
| Imperial College London | 3 |
| London School of Economics and Political Science | 3 |
| Loughborough University | 3 |
| University of Nottingham | 3 |
| Oxford Brookes University | 3 |
| University of Surrey | 3 |
| University of Warwick | 3 |
| University of York | 3 |

Universities with 2+ Runner-ups
| University | Runner-Ups |
|---|---|
| University of Exeter | 4 |
| University of Leeds | 2 |
| University of Leicester | 2 |
| University of St Andrews | 2 |

Universities with 2+ Wins
| University | Wins |
|---|---|
| University of Bath | 2 |
| Durham University | 2 |
| Imperial College London | 2 |
| Loughborough University | 2 |
| University of Oxford | 2 |
| University of St Andrews | 2 |
| University College London | 2 |
