= John M. Rhodes =

US Army major general (born 1965)

Major General John M. Rhodes
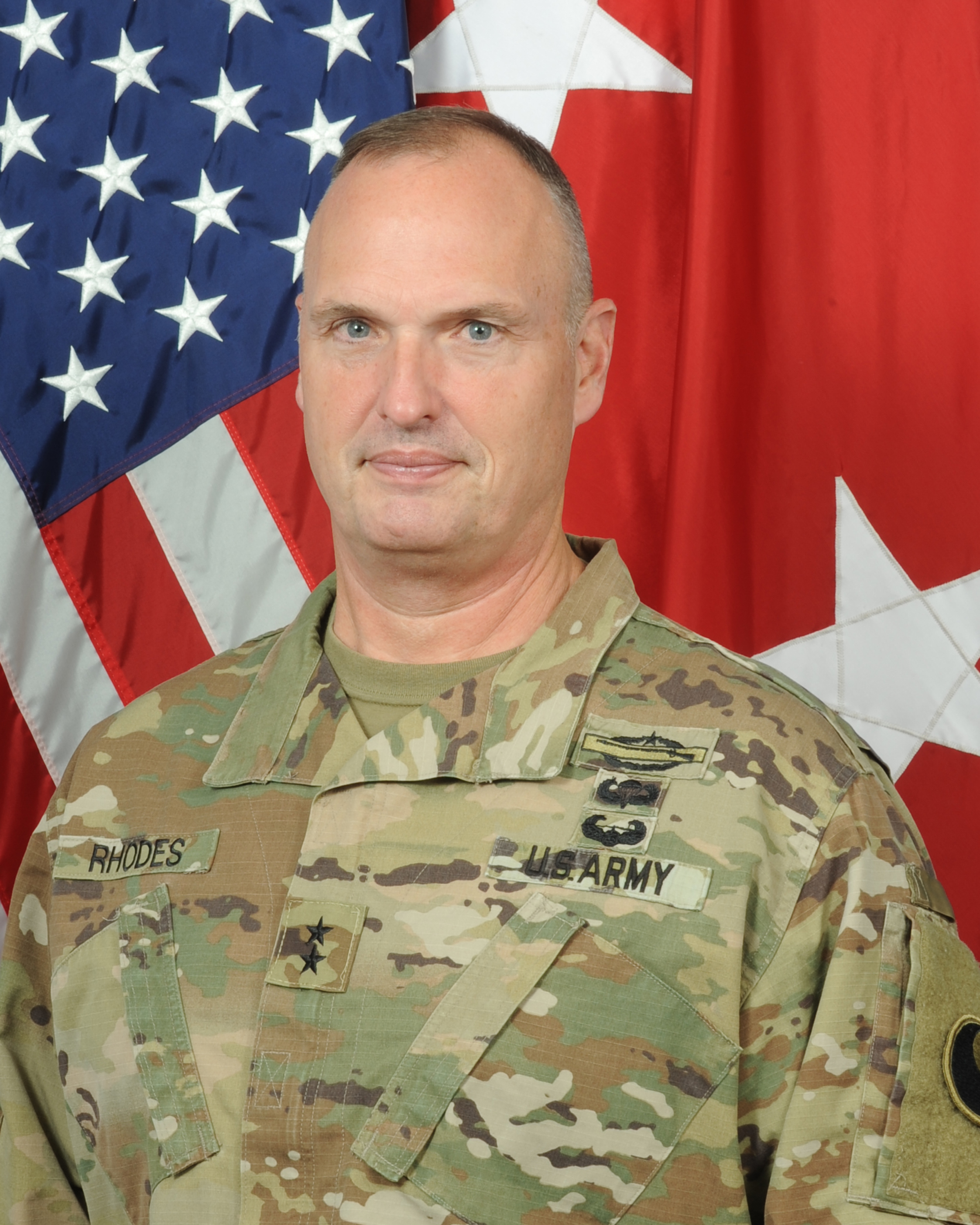
- Born: 1965 (age 60–61)
- Military career
- Service: United States Army; Mississippi Army National Guard
- Service years: 1987–Present
- Rank: Major General
- Commands: 29th Infantry Division; 66th Troop Command; 155th Armored Brigade Combat Team; 155th Infantry Regiment

John M. Rhodes is a General in the United States National Guard.
