= Steve Tomlinson =

Barbadian-born Welsh cricketer

Personal information
- Full name: Steven Charles Benjamin Tomlinson
- Born: 21 December 1978 (age 47); Bridgetown, Saint Michael, Barbados
- Batting: Right-handed
- Bowling: Right-arm medium-fast

Domestic team information
- Years: Team
- 1998: Glamorgan
- 1999–2001: Devon

Career statistics
Competition	List A
Matches	3
Runs scored	32
Batting average	16.00
100s/50s	0/0
Top score	30
Balls bowled	96
Wickets	2
Bowling average	39.50
5 wickets in innings	0
10 wickets in match	0
Best bowling	2/38
Catches/stumpings	1/–
- Source: Cricinfo, 6 February 2011

Steven Charles Benjamin Tomlinson (born 21 December 1978) is a Barbadian born former Welsh cricketer. Tomlinson was a right-handed batsman who bowled right-arm medium-fast. He was born in Bridgetown, Barbados.

Tomlinson was educated at The Oratory School, where he was awarded the Wetherall Award for the leading All-Rounder in English Schools in both 1996 and 1997. Having played age group and Second XI cricket for Glamorgan, Tomlinson made his debut for county at senior level in a List A match against Surrey in the Sunday League. He played one further match for Glamorgan, which came in the same competition against Warwickshire.

In 1999, he joined Devon, making his debut for the county in the Minor Counties Championship against Cheshire. Between 1999 and 2000 he played in 11 Championship matches for Devon, the last of which came against Cornwall. He played just a single match for Devon in 2001, in a List A fixture against Shropshire in the first round of the 2001 Cheltenham & Gloucester Trophy.
