= Trevor Anning =

English cricketer (born 1982)

Personal information
- Full name: Trevor Sean Anning
- Born: 22 March 1982 (age 44); Exeter, Devon, England
- Batting: Right-handed
- Bowling: Right-arm medium-fast

Domestic team information
- Years: Team
- 2002–2016: Devon
- LA debut: 12 September 2002 Devon v Cumberland
- Last LA: 3 May 2005 Devon v Essex

Career statistics
Competition	List A
Matches	2
Runs scored	5
Batting average	5.00
100s/50s	0/0
Top score	5
Balls bowled	83
Wickets	3
Bowling average	20
5 wickets in innings	0
10 wickets in match	0
Best bowling	3/40
Catches/stumpings	0/–
- Source: CricketArchive, 15 August 2008

Trevor Sean Anning (born 22 March 1982) is an English cricketer who plays for Devon County Cricket Club.

Although Anning has only played two List A matches for Devon, he has been a regular in the Minor Counties Championship and the Minor Counties Trophy. His highest batting score came in his Minor Counties Championship debut against Wiltshire County Cricket Club, scoring 75 whilst batting at number 9 in a partnership worth 129 with veteran Peter Roebuck. His best bowling performance was 7–86 against Hereford in July 2007.

Both of Anning's List A matches have come in the Cheltenham & Gloucester Trophy. In September 2002 (playing in the preliminary rounds to the 2003 competition), Anning did not bat against fellow Minor County Cumberland, but he took three wickets in a comfortable win for Devon. Anning also played in the 2005 competition, against a very strong Essex side, containing no fewer than 7 full internationals. Anning finished with highly-respectable bowling figures of 6–0–20–0 as Essex posted a target of 264 from 50 overs. Devon were 23 for 6 before Neil Hancock and Sandy Allen added 24 before Allen was caught behind by James Foster. Anning then successfully defended his wicket for 33 balls, scoring just 5 runs in half an hour, before being caught by Ravi Bopara off the spin bowling of Zimbabwean international Grant Flower. He was the last man out as Devon lost by 180 runs.

He also played 13 Second Eleven Trophy games for the Minor Counties under 25s.

Anning is leading the Devon bowling averages for 2008 with 24 wickets at an average of 21.71.
