= John Rhodes (cricketer) =

English cricketer

John Rhodes (born 4 September 1962) was an English cricketer. He was a right-handed batsman and right-arm medium-pace bowler who played for Devon. He was born in Lancaster.

Rhodes made his debut for Devon in the Minor Counties Championship of 1990, and played in the competition until 2001.

Rhodes made his first List A appearance for the team in 1995, in a game against Sussex, in which he took figures of 0–45 with the ball, but didn't bat in the match. Similarly in his second match, he did not bat, and was noted in the scorecard as being "absent hurt".

Having played consistently in the Minor Counties Championship for the following six years, he made his final appearance for the team in the C&G Trophy in September 2001.
