= Peter Walker (cricketer, born 1952) =

English cricketer

Peter Walker (born 20 August 1952) was an English cricketer. He was a left-handed batsman and right-arm medium-fast bowler who played for Devon. He was born in Stretford.

Walker, who played in the Minor Counties Championship for Devon between 1974 and 1978, made a single List A appearance for the team, during the 1978 Gillette Cup. From the lower-middle order, he scored 2 runs, and took figures of 0–40 from twelve overs of bowling.

In 1980, Walker played in the Minor Counties Championship for Bedfordshire.
