= Nick Folland =

English cricketer (born 1963)

Personal information
- Full name: Nicholas Arthur Folland
- Born: 17 September 1963 (age 63); Bristol, England
- Batting: Left-handed
- Bowling: Right-arm medium
- Role: Middle-order batsman
- Relatives: Neil Folland (brother)

Domestic team information
- Years: Team
- 1984–2001: Devon
- 1992–1994: Somerset
- FC debut: 11 July 1990 Minor Counties v Indians
- Last FC: 15 August 1994 Somerset v Middlesex
- LA debut: 4 July 1984 Devon v Sussex
- Last LA: 1 May 2001 Devon v Shropshire

Career statistics
Competition	First-class	List A
Matches	32	68
Runs scored	1,755	2,058
Batting average	34.41	33.19
100s/50s	2/10	3/15
Top score	108*	107*
Balls bowled	–	26
Wickets	–	1
Bowling average	–	55.00
5 wickets in innings	–	0
10 wickets in match	–	0
Best bowling	–	1/52
Catches/stumpings	206/–	35/–
- Source: CricketArchive, 8 December 2008

Nicholas Arthur Folland (born 17 September 1963) is a former first-class cricketer, who represented Somerset County Cricket Club between 1992 and 1994. He is now a school headmaster.

== Life and career ==
Nick Folland studied at Loughborough University, gaining a BSc and a PGCE. After graduating, he taught young deaf people for three years before joining the staff at Blundell's School in Devon.

Folland came into county cricket unusually late; following success at Minor Counties level with Devon, he was persuaded by Somerset that he could combine his teaching with a professional cricket career and made his debut in regular first-class cricket in 1992, at the age of 28. He had played one first-class match earlier for the Minor Counties representative side against the Indian tourists in 1990.

Folland went on to play 32 first-class matches and 68 at List A level. The highlight of his career was the two first-class centuries in a match that he made in 1993 against Sussex. These turned out to be the only two first-class hundreds of his career. He left regular cricket midway through the 1994 season, deciding, according to Wisden, that "regular first-class cricket was not for him".

He was the Head of Blundell's preparatory school for ten years. He became Head of St John's on the Hill Preparatory School in Chepstow, Monmouthshire, in 2011. From 2015 to 2021, he was Headmaster of Sherborne Prep.

His brother, Neil, taught at Haberdashers' Aske's Boys School with his Devon teammate Doug Yeabsley.
