= Sri Lankan cricket team in England in 1990 =

The Sri Lanka national cricket team toured England in the 1990 season to play six first-class matches and two limited overs matches against county teams.

The first-class fixtures were against:

- Glamorgan at Eugene Cross Park, Ebbw Vale
- Nottinghamshire at Cleethorpes
- Warwickshire at Edgbaston
- Sussex at Hove
- Lancashire at Old Trafford
- Hampshire at Southampton

== External sources ==
CricketArchive – tour itineraries

== Annual reviews ==
- Playfair Cricket Annual 1991
- Wisden Cricketers' Almanack 1991
