= Devon County Cricket Club =

English Cricket Club

Personnel
- Captain: Jamie Stephens
- Coach: David Tall

Team information
- Colors: Black, yellow and Blue bands
- Founded: 1899
- Home ground: Various

History
- National Counties Championship wins: 6
- MCCA Knockout Trophy wins: 5
- Official website: Devon CCC (Devon Cricket)

Devon County Cricket Club (Devon Cricket) is one of 20 minor county clubs within the domestic cricket structure of England and Wales. It represents the historic county of Devon.

The team is currently a member of the National Counties Championship Western Division Two and plays in the NCCA Knockout Trophy. Devon played List A matches occasionally from 1969 until 2005 but is not classified as a List A team 'per se'.

The Western Division Two of the National Counties Championship is made up of five teams with each team playing the others in three-day fixtures throughout the season. Devon also play in the 50-overs-a-side MCCA Knock Out Trophy. The county has an outstanding record in both the Championship and the one-day knockout trophy, which it has won five times, most recently in 2014.

The National Counties Championship is based on matches of two innings per side over three days. Counties are arranged into two geographical groups of ten – Eastern and Western sections – and sub-divided into divisions one and two with promotion and relegation between them.

At the end of the season, the team with the best record from the Eastern Division One plays the winner of the Western Division One for the National Counties Championship, over four days.

The NCCA Trophy is a 50-overs-a-side competition in which all teams initially play in a different group of five sides, organised geographically. The winner and runner-up in each of the four groups play in a series of knockout stages, culminating in a final.

== Honours ==
- Minor Counties Championship (7) - 1978, 1994, 1995, 1996, 1997, 2006, 2011; shared (1) - 2004
- MCCA Knockout Trophy (5) - 1992, 1994, 1998, 2008, 2014

== History ==
=== Earliest cricket ===
The earliest reference to cricket in the county dates from the 1790s. An embryo county organization existed in the 1820s, and a county club was initially founded in 1861. It went out of existence briefly in 1897 but was re-formed on 26 November 1899, and joined the Minor Counties’ Championship in 1901. At present twenty Minor Counties participate in three competitions.

Devon was the scene of a county club's foundation on 18 August 1875, but not its own. Somerset County Cricket Club was set up by some Somerset Gentlemen players at a meeting at Sidmouth CC, immediately after a match against the Gentlemen of Devon.

An application was made for first-class status and entry to the County Championship in 1948. However, the county was turned down. Devon has won the Minor Counties Championship eight times, one of them shared. It first won it in 1978 when Barrie Matthews was captain, and then under the captaincy of Peter Roebuck, it won for four consecutive years from 1994 to 1997, a record for the competition. There was a shared title with Bedfordshire in 2004, another success in 2006 and the most recent achievement was a victory against Cambridgeshire in the Championship final at March in September 2011.

Devon has won the MCCA Knockout Trophy four times since its inception in 1983 – in 1992, 1994, 1998 and 2008.

The county first played List A cricket in the 1969 Gillette Cup against Hertfordshire and appeared in 33 List A matches from 1969 to 2005, winning seven and losing 26, the majority of which were against first-class opponents. The county claimed the first-class scalp once, defeating Leicestershire in the 2004 Cheltenham & Gloucester Trophy. The right to play List A cricket was lost in 2006 when the Minor Counties were excluded from the Cheltenham & Gloucester Trophy from that onward.

=== Origin of club ===
The present Devon County Cricket Club was founded on 26 November 1899 and joined the Minor Counties Championship for the 1901 season.

=== Club history ===
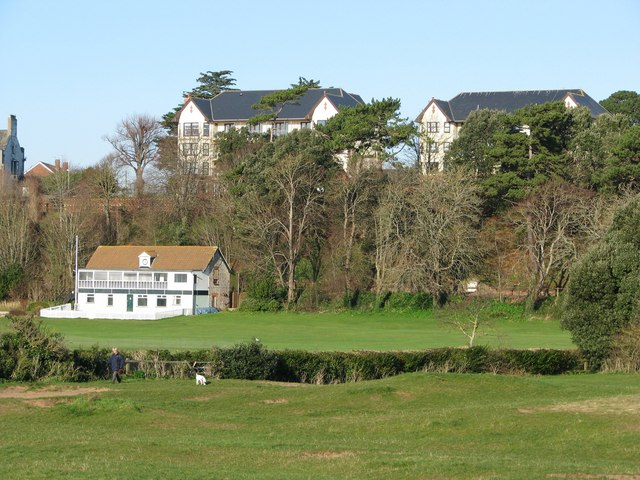
The Maer, the scene of Devon's victory over Leicestershire in the 2004 Cheltenham & Gloucester Trophy

Devon applied for first-class status and to join the County Championship in 1948. However, they were turned down. Wisden Cricketer's Almanack on page 952 of its 1950 edition, recorded that the application was discussed at the Advisory County Cricket Committee of existing first-class counties on 15 March 1949. It said: "No decision was made, but at the meeting, the counties could not find anything to support the application."

Devon has won the Minor Counties Championship seven times, one of them shared. It first won in 1978, when Barrie Matthews was skipper, and for four consecutive years from 1994 to 1997, a record for the competition, under the leadership of the late Peter Roebuck. There was a shared title with Bedfordshire in 2004 and another title in 2006. Their most recent success came in 2011 when they defeated Cambridgeshire in the championship final. Devon has won the MCCA Knockout Trophy five times since its inception in 1983. It won in 1992, 1994, 1998, 2008 and 2014.

The county first played List A cricket in the 1969 Gillette Cup against Hertfordshire. The county appeared in 33 List A matches from 1969 to 2005, winning seven and losing 26, the majority of which were against first-class opponents. The county claimed a first-class scalp once, defeating Leicestershire in the 2004 Cheltenham & Gloucester Trophy. Devon lost the right to play List A cricket when the Minor counties were excluded from the Cheltenham & Gloucester Trophy from the 2006 season onward.

In 2011, the Club set up a Development XI, the Devon Lions, to help bring on new players. It has links to the recently a formed charity, the David Shepherd Cricket Foundation, one of whose objectives is to nurture young cricketing talent in Devon. The Lions play some competitive games against university and county 2nd XI teams.

== Grounds ==
The club has no fixed home, but play their matches at various grounds across the county. Grounds used during the 2011 season include:

- North Devon Cricket Club Ground, Instow
- Recreation Ground, Bovey Tracey
- Recreation Ground, Torquay
- The Fortfield, Sidmouth
- The Maer Ground, Exmouth
- Creedy Park, nr Crediton
- County Ground, Exeter

== See also ==
- Devon Cricket League
- Devon Women cricket team

== External sources ==
- Devon Cricket
