= 1969 Gillette Cup =

- Administrator: Test and County Cricket Board
- Cricket format: Limited overs cricket (60 overs per innings)
- Tournament format: Knockout
- Champions: Yorkshire (2nd title)
- Participants: 22
- Matches: 21
- Most runs: 183 – Geoffrey Boycott (Yorkshire)
- Most wickets: 12 – Don Wilson (Yorkshire)

The 1969 Gillette Cup was the seventh Gillette Cup, an English limited overs county cricket tournament. It was held between 10 May and 6 September 1969. The tournament was won by Yorkshire who defeated Derbyshire by 69 runs in the final at Lord's.

== Format ==
The 17 first-class counties were joined by five Minor Counties: Buckinghamshire, Devon, Hertfordshire, Norfolk and Wiltshire. Teams who won in the first round progressed to the second round. The winners in the second round then progressed to the quarter-final stage. Winners from the quarter-finals then progressed to the semi-finals from which the winners then went on to the final at Lord's which was held on 6 September 1969.

== First round ==
10, 11 May 1969
Scorecard

Essex; 272/6 (60 overs)	v	Wiltshire; 147 (53.4 overs)
Brian Ward 73; James Merryweather 3/41 (12 overs)		Ian Lomax 63; Robin Hobbs 4/55 (12 overs)

Essex won by 125 runs
County Ground, Chelmsford
Umpires: Laurie Gray and Alan Oakman
Player of the match: Ian Lomax (Wilts)

- Match was scheduled for one day but extended to two.

10, 11, 12 May 1969
Scorecard

Hertfordshire; 173 (58.1 overs)	v	Devon; 75 (41.3 overs)
Alan Day 53; Robert Healey 6/14 (11.1 overs)		Chris Greetham 32; Brian Collins 3/21 (6.3 overs)

Hertfordshire won by 98 runs
Ditchmore Lane, Stevenage
Umpires: Lofty Herman and Eddie Phillipson
Player of the match: Robert Healey (Devon)

- Match was scheduled for one day but extended to three.

10, 11, 12 May 1969
Scorecard

Middlesex; 232/7 (60 overs)	v	Buckinghamshire; 104 (44.5 overs)
John Murray 47; Chris Pickett 3/26 (12 overs)		Brian Poll 23; Fred Titmus 4/17 (12 overs)

Middlesex won by 128 runs
Lord's, London
Umpires: John Langridge and Hugo Yarnold
Player of the match: Fred Titmus (Middx)

- Match was scheduled for one day but extended to three.

10, 11 May 1969
Scorecard

Yorkshire; 167 (44.4 overs)	v	Norfolk; 78 (50.4 overs)
John Hampshire 55; Tracey Moore 6/48 (10.4 overs)		James Donaldson 21; Chris Old 3/14 (7.4 overs)

Yorkshire won by 89 runs
County Ground, Norwich
Umpires: Freddie Jakeman and George Pope
Player of the match: John Hampshire (Yorks)

- Match was scheduled for one day but extended to two.

10, 12 May 1969
Scorecard

Glamorgan; 191/8 (60 overs)	v	Northamptonshire; 112 (45.2 overs)
Alan Jones 61; Mushtaq Mohammad 3/36 (12 overs)		Laurence Johnson 27; Majid Khan 5/24 (12 overs)

Glamorgan won by 79 runs
County Ground, Northampton
Umpires: David Constant and Arthur Jepson
Player of the match: Majid Khan (Glam)

- Match was scheduled for one day but extended to two.

10, 11 May 1969
Scorecard

Somerset; 144 (59 overs)	v	Derbyshire; 146/7 (59.3 overs)
Tony Clarkson 30; Fred Rumsey 3/19 (9 overs)		Peter Gibbs 47; Ken Palmer 4/26 (11.3 overs)

Derbyshire won by 3 wickets
County Ground, Taunton
Umpires: Lloyd Budd and Peter Wight
Player of the match: Fred Rumsey (Derbys)

- Match was scheduled for one day but extended to two.

== Second round ==
7 June 1969
Scorecard

Worcestershire; 156/6 (60 overs)	v	Derbyshire; 157/6 (58.1 overs)
Tom Graveney 61*; Peter Eyre 3/31 (12 overs)		Derek Morgan 33; Basil D'Oliveira 2/26 (12 overs)

Derbyshire won by 4 wickets
County Ground, Derby
Umpires: Charlie Elliott and Tom Spencer
Player of the match: Tom Graveney (Worcs)

7 June 1969
Scorecard

Glamorgan; 244/6 (60 overs)	v	Hertfordshire; 159/9 (60 overs)
Tony Lewis 96; Roy Wacey 2/44 (12 overs)		Henry Tilly 36; Malcolm Nash 3/18 (12 overs)

Glamorgan won by 85 runs
St Helen's, Swansea
Umpires: Harry Mellows and Peter Wight
Player of the match: Tony Lewis (Glam)

7 June 1969
Scorecard

Hampshire; 238/8 (60 overs)	v	Surrey; 239/7 (58.5 overs)
Barry Richards 78; Geoff Arnold 2/22 (12 overs)		John Edrich 59; Bob Cottam 2/46 (12 overs)

Surrey won by 3 wickets
County Ground, Southampton
Umpires: Jack Crapp and Lofty Herman
Player of the match: Barry Richards (Hants)

7 June 1969
Scorecard

Lancashire; 173/8 (60 overs)	v	Yorkshire; 174/3 (48.5 overs)
David Hughes 29*; Don Wilson 3/32 (12 overs)		Phil Sharpe 68; Peter Lever 3/37 (10 overs)

Yorkshire won by 7 wickets
Old Trafford, Manchester
Umpires: David Constant and Eddie Phillipson
Player of the match: Phil Sharpe (Yorks)

7 June 1969
Scorecard

Kent; 172 (59.4 overs)	v	Leicestershire; 175/7 (59.1 overs)
Mike Denness 69; Peter Marner 4/26 (10 overs)		Brian Booth 65; Norman Graham 2/31 (11.1 overs)

Leicestershire won by 3 wickets
Grace Road, Leicester
Umpires: Syd Buller and George Pope
Player of the match: Peter Marner (Leics)

7 June 1969
Scorecard

Middlesex; 231/6 (60 overs)	v	Nottinghamshire; 235/3 (56.1 overs)
Peter Parfitt 119; Garfield Sobers 3/26 (12 overs)		Basher Hassan 78; Ronald Hooker 1/40 (12 overs)

Nottinghamshire won by 7 wickets
Trent Bridge, Nottingham
Umpires: Dusty Rhodes and Hugo Yarnold
Player of the match: Peter Parfitt (Middx)

7 June 1969
Scorecard

Gloucestershire; 86 (49.2 overs)	v	Sussex; 87/2 (18.5 overs)
David Shepherd 19; Mike Buss 4/14 (12 overs)		Mike Buss 54*; Tony Brown 2/39 (6 overs)

Sussex won by 8 wickets
County Ground, Hove
Umpires: John Arnold and Arthur Fagg
Player of the match: Mike Buss (Sussex)

7 June 1969
Scorecard

Warwickshire; 146 (54.1 overs)	v	Essex; 147/3 (45.1 overs)
Jim Stewart 50; Brian Edmeades 3/28 (12 overs)		Keith Fletcher 54*; Norman McVicker 2/34 (10 overs)

Essex won by 7 wickets
Edgbaston, Birmingham
Umpires: Freddie Jakeman and Arthur Jepson
Player of the match: Brian Edmeades (Essex)

== Quarter-finals ==
2 July 1969
Scorecard

Glamorgan; 117 (54.4 overs)	v	Derbyshire; 121/1 (43.2 overs)
Tony Lewis 60; Harold Rhodes 4/18 (12 overs)		David Smith 49; Lawrence Williams 1/28 (10 overs)

Derbyshire won by 9 wickets
Sophia Gardens, Cardiff
Umpires: Lloyd Budd and Jack Crapp
Player of the match: Harold Rhodes (Derbys)

2 July 1969
Scorecard

Essex; 180/9 (60 overs)	v	Nottinghamshire; 182/8 (59.1 overs)
Keith Fletcher 74; Barry Stead 2/17 (12 overs)		Brian Bolus 37; Keith Boyce 2/20 (12 overs)

Nottinghamshire won by 2 wickets
Trent Bridge, Nottingham
Umpires: Bill Alley and Cec Pepper
Player of the match: Keith Fletcher (Essex)

2 July 1969
Scorecard

Yorkshire; 272 (59.4 overs)	v	Surrey; 134 (41.3 overs)
Brian Close 96; Stewart Storey 3/67 (11.4 overs)		Stewart Storey 33; Don Wilson 4/31 (8.3 overs)

Yorkshire won by 138 runs
The Oval, London
Umpires: John Langridge and Alan Oakman
Player of the match: Brian Close (Yorks)

2 July 1969
Scorecard

Sussex; 191 (59.3 overs)	v	Leicestershire; 131 (45.4 overs)
Jim Parks 51; Peter Marner 4/30 (12 overs)		Peter Marner 40; Mike Buss 4/24 (8.4 overs)

Sussex won by 60 runs
County Ground, Hove
Umpires: John Arnold and Laurie Gray
Player of the match: Peter Marner (Leics)

== Semi-finals ==
30 July 1969
Scorecard

Derbyshire; 136 (56.4 overs)	v	Sussex; 49 (35.2 overs)
Peter Gibbs 44; Tony Buss 4/27 (10.4 overs)		Jim Parks 16; Peter Eyre 6/18 (10.2 overs)

Derbyshire won by 87 runs
Queen's Park, Chesterfield
Umpires: Ron Aspinall and Harry Mellows
Player of the match: Peter Eyre (Derbys)

30 July 1969
Scorecard

Yorkshire; 191 (59.4 overs)	v	Nottinghamshire; 123 (50.5 overs)
Phil Sharpe 67; Barry Stead 3/46 (11.4 overs)		Pasty Harris 31; Peter Stringer 3/4 (4.5 overs)

Yorkshire won by 68 runs
North Marine Road, Scarborough
Umpires: Cec Pepper and George Pope
Player of the match: Phil Sharpe (Yorks)

== Final ==
6 September 1969
Scorecard

Yorkshire; 219/8 (60 overs)	v	Derbyshire; 150 (54.4 overs)
Barrie Leadbeater 76; Alan Ward 3/31 (12 overs)		Ian Buxton 34; Brian Close 3/36 (11 overs)

Yorkshire won by 69 runs
Lord's, London
Umpires: Tom Spencer and Hugo Yarnold
Player of the match: Barrie Leadbeater (Yorks)
