= 1963 Gillette Cup =

- Administrator: MCC
- Cricket format: Limited overs cricket (65 overs)
- Tournament format: Knockout
- Champions: Sussex (1st title)
- Participants: 17
- Matches: 16
- Most runs: 277 – Jim Parks, Jr. (Sussex)
- Most wickets: 14 – Jack Flavell (Worcestershire)

The 1963 Gillette Cup was an English county cricket tournament, held between 1 May and 7 September 1963. The tournament was won by Sussex.

== Preliminary round ==
1–2 May 1963
Scorecard

Lancashire; 304/9 (65 overs)	v	Leicestershire; 203 (53.3 overs)
Peter Marner 121; John Savage 4/54 (8)		Maurice Hallam 106; Brian Statham 5/28 (12)

Lancashire won by 101 runs
Old Trafford, Manchester
Umpires: Ron Aspinall and Hugo Yarnold
Player of the match: Peter Marner (Lancs)

== First round ==
22 May 1963
Scorecard

Glamorgan; 207/8 (65 overs)	v	Somerset; 197 (62.2 overs)
Bernard Hedges 103*; Fred Rumsey 4/24 (15)		Brian Langford 56; Jeff Jones 3/34 (15)

Glamorgan won by 10 runs
Cardiff Arms Park
Umpires: Arthur Jepson and Buddy Oldfield
Player of the match: Bernard Hedges (Glam)

22 May 1963
Scorecard

Middlesex; 170 (64.3 overs)	v	Gloucestershire; 131 (51.5 overs)
Ted Clark 42; David Allen 4/28 (15)		Ron Nicholls 44; Alan Moss 4/14 (11.5)

Middlesex won by 39 runs
County Cricket Ground, Bristol
Umpires: Charlie Elliott and Jim Hammond
Player of the match: Don Bennett (Middx)

22 May 1963
Scorecard

Derbyshire; 250/9 (65 overs)	v	Hampshire; 244 (64.3 overs)
Ian Hall 61; Dennis Baldry 4/70 (15)		Mike Barnard 98; Derek Morgan 2/49 (15)

Derbyshire won by 6 runs
Dean Park, Bournemouth
Umpires: Arthur Fagg and Frank Lee
Player of the match: Derek Morgan (Derbys)

22 May 1963
Scorecard

Sussex; 314/7 (65 overs)	v	Kent; 242 (56.2 overs)
Ken Suttle 104; Alan Brown 3/63 (15)		Peter Richardson 127; Ted Dexter 2/35 (11)

Sussex won by 72 runs
Nevill Ground, Tunbridge Wells
Umpires: John Arnold and David Smith
Player of the match: Peter Richardson (Kent)

22 May 1963
Scorecard

Lancashire; 213 (59.2 overs)	v	Essex; 132 (45.1 overs)
Jack Dyson 60*; Trevor Bailey 4/47 (14)		Gordon Barker 44; Jack Dyson 5/47 (13.1)

Lancashire won by 81 runs
Old Trafford, Manchester
Umpires: Paul Gibb and Hugo Yarnold
Player of the match: Jack Dyson (Lancs)

22 May 1963
Scorecard

Warwickshire; 140 (56.2 overs)	v	Northamptonshire; 141/4 (57.5 overs)
Dennis Amiss 34; David Larter 3/38 (15)		Roger Prideaux 52*; Raymond Hitchcock 2/32 (11)

Northamptonshire won by 6 wickets
County Cricket Ground, Northampton
Umpires: Jim Parks, Sr. and Dusty Rhodes
Player of the match: Roger Prideaux (Northants)

22 May 1963
Scorecard

Worcestershire; 229/9 (65 overs)	v	Surrey; 115 (47.2 overs)
Ron Headley 83; Peter Loader 3/35 (15)		Micky Stewart 49; Jim Standen 5/14 (15)

Worcestershire won by 114 runs
New Road, Worcester
Umpires: Jack Crapp and Ron Lay
Player of the match: Jim Standen (Worcs)

22 May 1963
Scorecard

Nottinghamshire; 159 (64 overs)	v	Yorkshire; 160/6 (55 overs)
Brian Bolus 100*; Fred Trueman 4/30 (15)		Doug Padgett 38; Keith Gillhouley 4/33 (14)

Yorkshire won by 4 wickets
Acklam Park, Middlesbrough
Umpires: Bill Copson and Freddie Jakeman
Player of the match: Brian Bolus (Notts)

== Quarter-finals ==
12 June 1963
Scorecard

Worcestershire; 238/8 (65 overs)	v	Glamorgan; 192 (51 overs)
Tom Graveney 93; Jeff Jones 3/54 (15)		Euros Lewis 78; Jack Flavell 5/43 (14)

Worcestershire won by 46 runs
The Gnoll, Neath
Umpires: Bill Copson and Fred Gardner
Player of the match: Tom Graveney (Worcs)

12 June 1963
Scorecard

Derbyshire; 148 (57.3 overs)	v	Lancashire; 149/5 (49.4 overs)
Ian Hall 31; Colin Hilton 3/30 (12.3)		Robert Entwistle 48; Harold Rhodes 2/33 (11.4)

Lancashire won by 5 wickets
Old Trafford, Manchester
Umpires: Ron Aspinall and Charlie Elliott
Player of the match: Robert Entwistle (Lancs)

12 June 1963
Scorecard

Middlesex; 129 (40.1 overs)	v	Northamptonshire; 132/4 (39 overs)
Ronald Hooker 43; David Larter 4/22 (11)		Colin Milburn 84; Alan Moss 2/23 (12)

Northamptonshire won by 6 wickets
Lord's Cricket Ground, London
Umpires: Lofty Herman and John Langridge
Player of the match: Colin Milburn (Northants)

12 June 1963
Scorecard

Sussex; 292 (64 overs)	v	Yorkshire; 270 (63.3 overs)
Jim Parks, Jr. 90; Brian Close 4/60 (15)		Geoffrey Boycott 71; Ian Thomson 3/52 (15)

Sussex won by 22 runs
County Cricket Ground, Hove
Umpires: Laurie Gray and Fred Price
Player of the match: Jim Parks, Jr. (Sussex)

== Semi-finals ==
10 July 1963
Scorecard

Sussex; 292 (62.1 overs)	v	Northamptonshire; 187 (49.3 overs)
Ted Dexter 115; David Larter 4/68 (14.1)		Roger Prideaux 73; Ian Thomson 4/33 (13.3)

Sussex won by 105 runs
County Cricket Ground, Northampton
Umpires: Syd Buller and David Smith
Player of the match: Ted Dexter (Sussex)

10 July 1963
Scorecard

Lancashire; 59 (31.1 overs)	v	Worcestershire; 60/1 (10.1 overs)
Brian Booth 21; Jack Flavell 6/14 (13)		Martin Horton 29*; Ken Higgs 1/19 (5)

Worcestershire won by 9 wickets
New Road, Worcester
Umpires: Paul Gibb and Arthur Jepson
Player of the match: Jack Flavell (Worcs)

== Final ==
7 September 1963
Scorecard

Sussex; 168 (60.2 overs)	v	Worcestershire; 154 (63.2 overs)
Jim Parks, Jr. 57; Norman Gifford 4/33 (15)		Roy Booth 33*; John Snow 3/13 (8)

Sussex won by 14 runs
Lord's Cricket Ground, London
Umpires: Fred Gardner and Frank Lee
Player of the match: Norman Gifford (Worcs)
