= Ian Jones (sportsman, born 1934) =

English sportsman (1934–2016)

Kim Jones
Personal information
- Born: 11 October 1934 Leeds, England
- Died: 24 November 2016 (aged 82) Norfolk, England
- Height: 178 cm (5 ft 10 in)
- Weight: 72 kg (159 lb)

Sport
- Sport: Field hockey
Senior career
Years	Team	Caps	Goals
1959–1963	Southgate	-	-
1964–1968	Bishop's Stortford	-	-
National team
Years	Team	Caps	Goals
–	Great Britain		-
–	England		-

Ian Jones
Cricket information
- Batting: Unknown
- Bowling: Right-arm medium

Domestic team information
- Years: Team
- 1959: Cambridge University
- 1959–1969: Hertfordshire

Career statistics
Competition	First-class	List A
Matches	2	2
Runs scored	44	19
Batting average	14.66	9.50
100s/50s	–/–	–/–
Top score	44	19
Balls bowled	–	–
Wickets	–	–
Bowling average	–	–
5 wickets in innings	–	–
10 wickets in match	–	–
Best bowling	–	–
Catches/stumpings	1/–	–/–
- Source: Cricinfo, 1 August 2011

Charles Ian McMillan Jones, also known as Kim Jones FRSA (11 October 1934 – 24 November 2016) was an English sportsman and academic who served as teacher and educational administrator from 1960 to 1997. He represented Great Britain at field hockey and participated at the 1960 and the 1964 Summer Olympics. He also played cricket at a high level, between 1959 and 1969, including appearing in the 1969 Gillette Cup.

== Biography ==
Born in Leeds, Jones was educated at Bishop's Stortford College and at St John's College, Cambridge. He was a second lieutenant in the Royal Artillery, between 1953 and 1955, head of the geography department at Bishop's Stortford College, between 1960 and 1970, and vice-principal of King William's College, between 1971 and 1975. He was headmaster of Bedford School, between 1975 and 1986, director of studies at Britannia Royal Naval College, between 1986 and 1988, and project director at CfBT Education Trust, between 1988 and 1997.

== Hockey ==
Jones played field hockey for Hertfordshire, Cambridge University, England and Great Britain, representing Great Britain in the 1960 and the 1964 Olympic Games. He was manager of the England Schoolboy Hockey XI, between 1967 and 1974, manager of the England Hockey XI, between 1968 and 1969, and president of the English Schoolboys Hockey Association, between 1980 and 1988.

== Cricket ==
Jones' batting style remains to be described, but it is known that he bowled right-arm medium pace. He made his first-class debut for Cambridge University against Worcestershire in 1959. He batted once in this match, in the course of which he was dismissed for a duck by Derek Pearson. He made a further first-class appearance for the university, which came in that season against Middlesex. In this match, Jones was dismissed for a duck in the Cambridge first-innings by Robert Caple, while in their second-innings he scored 44 runs before being dismissed by Bob Hurst.

In 1959, Jones made his debut for Hertfordshire against Cambridgeshire in the Minor Counties Championship. He played minor counties cricket for Hertfordshire between 1959 and 1969, making 33 Minor Counties Championship appearances. He made his List A debut against Devon in the 1st round of the 1969 Gillette Cup, scoring 19 runs before being dismissed by Robert Healey, in a match which Hertfordshire won by 98 runs. He made his second and final List A appearance in the second round of the same competition against Glamorgan. In this match, he was dismissed for a duck by Malcolm Nash, with Glamorgan winning the match by 85 runs.

== Death ==
Jones died in Norfolk on 24 November 2016, at the age of 82.
