= Simon Jones (cricketer) =

Welsh cricketer

Simon Jones MBE
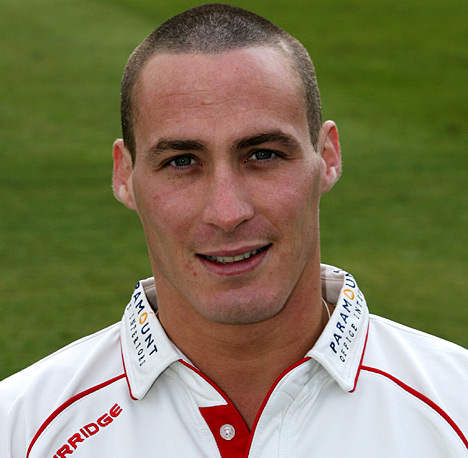

Personal information
- Full name: Simon Philip Jones
- Born: 25 December 1978 (age 47); Morriston, Swansea, Wales
- Nickname: Horse, Shoe Pie
- Height: 6 ft 3 in (1.91 m)
- Batting: Left-handed
- Bowling: Right-arm fast
- Relatives: Jeff Jones (father)

International information
- National side: England (2002–2005)
- Test debut (cap 610): 25 July 2002 v India
- Last Test: 28 August 2005 v Australia
- ODI debut (cap 186): 4 December 2004 v Zimbabwe
- Last ODI: 12 July 2005 v Australia

Domestic team information
- Years: Team
- 1998–2007: Glamorgan
- 2008–2009: Worcestershire
- 2009–2011: Hampshire (squad no. 10)
- 2011: → Glamorgan (loan) (squad no. 50)
- 2012–2013: Glamorgan (squad no. 50)

Career statistics
Competition	Test	ODI	FC	LA
Matches	18	8	91	54
Runs scored	205	1	904	82
Batting average	15.76	1.00	11.89	11.71
100s/50s	0/0	0/0	0/0	0/0
Top score	44	1	46	26
Balls bowled	2,821	348	13,374	2,193
Wickets	59	7	267	55
Bowling average	28.23	39.28	30.49	36.00
5 wickets in innings	3	0	15	1
10 wickets in match	0	0	1	0
Best bowling	6/53	2/43	6/45	5/32
Catches/stumpings	4/–	0/–	18/–	4/–
- Source: Cricinfo, 18 October 2012

Simon Philip Jones MBE (born 25 December 1978) is a Welsh former cricketer, who played internationally for the England cricket team. Jones played in eighteen Test matches for England, before injury ended his international career. He played county cricket for Glamorgan, Worcestershire and Hampshire, before retiring in 2013. His father, Jeff Jones, played cricket for Glamorgan and England in the 1960s.

== Early career ==
A tall (6 ft 3 in (1.91 m)) right-arm fast bowler and left-handed tail-end batsman, Jones, whose father, Jeffrey, had played for England and Glamorgan, made his county cricket debut for Glamorgan against Derbyshire at Sophia Gardens, Cardiff, on 22 August 1998.

Jones made his Test match debut at Lord's Cricket Ground against India on 25 July 2002, at the age of 23. After making an impressive 44 from 43 deliveries with the bat, Jones ended the Indian first innings with figures of 2–61 off 21 overs, dismissing Ajay Ratra and Ajit Agarkar. In England's second innings, Jones did not bat, as England declared for 301–6, setting India a target of 568 to win. As India chased, Jones took 2–68, bowling Virender Sehwag, and having VVS Laxman caught by Michael Vaughan for 74, with England winning the match by 170 runs. Jones was left out of the subsequent three Tests, with the four-match series ending in a 1–1 draw.

After impressing in that one Test, Jones was then selected for the 2002/2003 Ashes tour. However, on the first morning of the first Test at Brisbane Cricket Ground, having bowled seven overs and taken the wicket of Justin Langer, he suffered a severe injury, rupturing an anterior cruciate ligament while sliding to field a ball. After a lengthy recovery period, he was fit in time to tour the Caribbean.

== West Indies Tour ==
In March, 2004, England embarked on a tour of the Caribbean, and Jones was included in the squad. In the first Test against the West Indies, at Sabina Park in Kingston, Jamaica, Jones had match figures of 3–72, dismissing Brian Lara, Ridley Jacobs, and Ryan Hinds, as England won the Test match by 10 wickets. In the second Test, Jones took the wicket of Shivnarine Chanderpaul in the first innings, before taking 5–57 in the second, dismissing the first four batsmen – (Chris Gayle, Devon Smith, Ramnaresh Sarwan, and Ridley Jacobs), as well as Pedro Collins. It was Jones' first five-for in Test cricket, and England won the match by seven wickets. In the third Test at Bridgetown, Barbados, Jones took just one wicket, in the first innings – that of Collins, once again – and did not bowl in the second innings, as England won the match by eight wickets, and led the series by 3–0. The final Test of the series was equally uneventful for Jones, personally, as he took just one wicket, in a first innings in which Brian Lara scored a world record 400 not out. England won the four-match series 3–0.

== Lead up to The Ashes ==
In May 2004, New Zealand toured England. Jones played in the first Test at Lord's, and took match figures of 4–146. England won the match by seven wickets, but Jones did not play again for England until the West Indies returned to tour.

On the West Indies' return to England in July 2004, Jones played just one match, again at Lord's, taking one wicket, before finding himself out of the Test lineup, but England went on to win the four-match home series 4–0.

In December of that year, Jones was included in the England squad to tour Zimbabwe and South Africa. Jones won his One Day International debut in the third ODI against Zimbabwe on 4 December 2004. Jones took 2–43 at an economy of 5.375, as England won the match by seven wickets. Jones then played in the final ODI, this time taking 1–33 at 4.12, with England again winning, this time by 74 runs, and completing the 4–0 series whitewash.

Jones then played in the first Test match in Johannesburg, dismissing Boeta Dippenaar in the first innings, before taking 4–39 in the second, including the wicket of Jacques Kallis for 61. England won the match by seven wickets, with Jones scoring 24 in the first innings. In the second Test at Kingsmead in Durban, Jones scored 21 in England's first innings, and took 2–117 in the match. The match was drawn, and England and Jones moved on to the third Test at Newlands. Here, Jones took 3–84 in the match, but found himself left out of the fourth Test, replaced by James Anderson. England won the fourth Test, but Jones was once again restored to the Test team for the final match of the series at the SuperSport Park in Centurion, Gauteng. Jones impressed with four wickets in the first innings, conceding just 47 runs, but took just one in the second, as England drew the match but won the series 2–1.

Jones then played both matches in the home Test series against Bangladesh, as England's four-man pace attack of Hoggard, Harmison, Flintoff, and Jones, prepared for the 2005 Ashes series. The pace attack tore through Bangladesh in the first innings of the first Test, dismissing them for 108, with Jones grabbing the wicket of Javed Omar, and conceding just four runs in six overs. In the second innings, the England seamers once again dismissed the Bangladeshis for a low score, this time just 159, with Jones picking up figures of 3–29 off 11 overs, while Flintoff, Hoggard, and Harmison, taking three, two, and two, wickets, respectively, with England winning the match by an innings and 261 runs. The second Test took a similar course, as the England pacers took 19 of the 20 Bangladeshi wickets, with Jones taking 1–75 in the match, and England winning by an innings and 27 runs.

== 2005 Ashes series ==
Jones played in two ODI matches of the NatWest Series in June – July, 2005. Jones took 2–53 in the abandoned 8th match at Edgbaston, before taking 1–45 in the final of the tournament, which ended in a tie.

Then, in the ODI series against Australia, in the lead-up to the Ashes, Jones played in two of the three matches of the series, but failed to take a single wicket.

In the first Test of the Ashes series at Lord's, Jones took 2–48 in the first innings, in which Australia were restricted to just 190. Jones also managed 20 not out off 21 deliveries, helping England to a meagre 155 in response to Australia's total. In the second innings, Australia managed 384 all out, setting England a target of 420 to win the match. Jones took 1–69 from his 18 overs. England could only manage 180 in reply, and Australia won the first match by 239.

In the second Test at Edgbaston, Jones played a significant role, scoring 19 not out from 24 deliveries, helping England to a first innings total of 407 all out. Jones then produced a controlled swing performance to dismiss Justin Langer and Brett Lee, capturing figures of 2–69, as Australia were bowled out for 308, 99 runs behind England. Jones was once again undismissed in the second innings, this time for 12, as England set Australia 282 runs to win. Jones dismissed Matthew Hayden for 31 as Australia lost by two runs despite brave efforts from Lee and Warne, and Jones finished with figures of 1–23 in the second innings.

The third Test at Old Trafford Cricket Ground was remarkably successful for Jones, as he picked up the wickets of Ricky Ponting, Adam Gilchrist, Shane Warne, Michael Clarke, Jason Gillespie and Brett Lee, as he collected figures of 6–53, his best bowling innings, before adding the wicket of Michael Clarke, in which Jones bowled a reverse-swinging delivery which Clarke left, expecting the ball to swing away, before it moved back towards the batsman and uprooted his off-stump. This took his match figures to 7–110, his personal best. The match finished in a remarkable draw, as the Australians finished the fifth day just 52 runs behind, and with one wicket remaining.

During the fourth Test at Trent Bridge, Jones, in the first innings, took a devastating 5–44, trapping captain Ponting as one of his dismissals. However, he then succumbed to an ankle injury during the second innings, which meant he only bowled four overs for no wickets. This injury forced him out of the crucial deciding match at The Oval, as well as out of England's winter tour to Pakistan. Jones finished the Ashes series with 18 wickets at an average of 21.00, and England went on to win the series 2–1, reclaiming the Ashes for the first time since 1986–87. The fourth Ashes test also became his final international test match.

== Second major injury ==
On 26 February 2006, Jones sustained a twisting injury to his left ankle while bowling in the nets in preparation for the first Test of England's tour to India, which was to commence three days later. On 27 February, Jones was sent home to see a specialist, and played no further part in the Test series.

Having spent the rest of the winter recovering, Jones played his first match since the 4th Ashes Test on 19 April 2006. Playing for Glamorgan, he took one wicket for 23 runs in a match against Cardiff UCCE, and stated he was pleased with his recovery. However, on 1 May, he broke down with a new injury to his left knee in a victory against Ireland in the C&G Trophy. The injury kept him out of the Test and O.D.I. series against Sri Lanka, which was due to start the next week.

In June 2006, he flew to Colorado for surgery on his knee by surgeon Richard Steadman, with the England team stating that he would not be expected to bowl for five months, and was unlikely to participate in the 2006/07 tour of Australia. In the 2006 New Year Honours, Jones was appointed Member of the Order of the British Empire (MBE) for services to cricket, following his role in the successful Ashes tournament, and in April he was named a Wisden Cricketer of the Year.

In September 2006, despite continuing injury problems which prevented him from returning to professional cricket until the start of the 2007 domestic season, his Central Contract with the ECB was renewed for another 12 months. Jones returned to action for his county, Glamorgan, in April 2007.

== Moves to Worcestershire and Hampshire ==
As his contract with Glamorgan was due to expire at the end of the 2007 season, Jones was linked with a move away from Glamorgan. After speculation linking him to Hampshire, on 19 October Jones moved to Division Two side Worcestershire, on a two-year contract. Yet another injury (this time to the neck) confined Jones to just three overs in the first game of the 2008 season. He returned to action for Worcestershire in a one-day game against Hampshire on 11 May 2008, recording career best figures of 5 for 32 from 10 overs and bowling well over 90 mph. This led to speculation that he may yet return to the England team once more.

Shortly after the surprise international call-up for Darren Pattinson, chosen ahead of Jones, Jones suffered another knee injury requiring yet more surgery.

"The surgeon was happy," Jones said. "He said, 'You can never be 100% [but] I'm 80 to 90% sure you'll be fine – you are always going to have 10 or 20% [chance that you won't play again]'."

Jones, though, is happy with those odds. He has beaten worse predictions before after being given a 70% chance of recovering from his horrific cruciate ligament injury at Brisbane in 2002. "I'll always back myself," he said. "I know if I can bowl at the top of my game I can get in that side."

With no hope of playing cricket in the remaining 2009 season, and with it being the final year of his contract, on 19 July Worcestershire released Jones. Towards the end of the 2009 domestic season, Jones opened talks with Glamorgan and Hampshire County Cricket Club.

Jones eventually opted to sign for Hampshire, and joined the club on 30 September 2009, with a view to regaining his fitness in time for the 2010 County Championship. Jones played a number of limited-over matches for Hampshire that season, and eventually made his first-class debut at the end of the season, in a match versus Warwickshire, taking 4–60 in the only innings in which he bowled.

In January 2011, Jones played for Hampshire in the 2011 Caribbean Twenty20, a tournament which Hampshire were invited to take part in. He played all of Hampshire's fixtures in the tournament, including the final against Trinidad and Tobago, which Hampshire lost. Jones was the competition's joint leading wicket-taker, along with teammate Hamza Riazuddin, with 12.

== Return to Glamorgan ==
Jones returned to Glamorgan on a month's loan on 17 June 2011, Hampshire reiterating that he was still part of their plans for the coming year. However, on 19 October 2011, Glamorgan Cricket Club announced he had signed a two-year deal to return to the Welsh county where he started his career. In his first season, he was used almost exclusively in the CB40 and Twenty20 competitions.

On 13 September 2013, Jones announced his retirement from first-class and List A cricket after the YB40 final.

== Career best performances ==
Updated 18 October 2011

	Batting				Bowling			
	Score	Fixture	Venue	Season	Score	Fixture	Venue	Season
Tests	44	England v India	Lord's	2002	6–53	England v Australia	Manchester	2005
ODI	1	England v Australia	Lord's	2005	2–43	England v Zimbabwe	Bulawayo	2004
FC	46	Glamorgan v Yorkshire	Scarborough	2001	6–45	Glamorgan v Derbyshire	Cardiff	2002
LA	26	Glamorgan Dragons v Hampshire Hawks	Swansea	2007	5–32	Worcestershire Royals v Hampshire Hawks	Worcester	2008
T20	11*	Worcestershire Royals v Warwickshire Bears	Birmingham	2008	4–10	Hampshire Royals v Barbados	St. John's	2011

== Personal life ==
Jones lives in Cardiff.

In February 2006, Jones was placed ninth and the highest-placed sportsman in a poll of the world's sexiest men, voted for by readers of New Woman magazine.

In July 2015, his memoirs, The Test: My Life, and the Inside Story of the Greatest Ashes Series, were published by Random House.

Since retiring, Jones works as a school cricket coach and runs summer cricket camps.
