= 2010–11 Caribbean Twenty20 =

- Administrator(s): WICB
- Cricket format: Twenty20
- Tournament format(s): Round-robin and knockout
- Host(s): West Indies
- Champions: Trinidad and Tobago (1st title)
- Participants: 10
- Matches: 24
- Player of the series: (Trinidad and Tobago) Lendl Simmons
- Most runs: (Jamaica) Marlon Samuels (234)
- Most wickets: Hamza Riazuddin (Hampshire); Simon Jones (Hampshire) (12)
- Official website: ct20.windiescricket.com

The 2010–11 Caribbean Twenty20 season was the second season of the Caribbean Twenty20, a domestic Twenty20 tournament administrated by the West Indies Cricket Board. The season began on 10 January 2011, six months after the 2010 tournament, and concluded with the final on 23 January. The tournament was moved to be considerably earlier than the Champions League Twenty20, for which the best performing domestic team will qualify. The move also gives preferable weather conditions, as many matches were affected by rain in 2010. The tournament had ten participating teams, featuring all eight from the 2010 season and the addition of the winners and runners-up of the 2010 Friends Provident t20 – England's domestic Twenty20 tournament.

Trinidad and Tobago won the tournament and qualified for the qualifying stage of the 2011 Champions League Twenty20. They defeated Hampshire in the final. Jamaica came third and Windward Islands came fourth.

== Venues ==
All matches were played at the following two grounds:

North Sound, Antigua	Bridgetown, Barbados
Sir Vivian Richards Stadium	Kensington Oval
Capacity: 10,000	Capacity: 15,000
2010–11 Caribbean Twenty20 is located in Caribbean

== Format ==
The tournament consisted of 24 matches, and was divided into a group stage and a knockout stage. If a match ended in a tie, a Super Over was to be played to determine the winner. The group stage had the teams divided into two equal groups, with each playing a round-robin tournament. The top two teams of each group advanced to the knockout stage. The knockout stage consisted of two semi-finals, a third-place playoff and the grand final. The semi-finals had the top team of one group facing the second from the other. The winners of the semi-finals played in the grand final to determine the winner of the competition, while the losers of the semi-finals played in the third-place playoff.

Points in the group stage were awarded as follows:

Points
Results	Points
Win	4 points
No result	1 point
Loss	0 points

== Teams ==
The following teams participated in the tournament. Hampshire and Somerset were the winners and runners-up of the 2010 Friends Provident t20 which meant they were invited to play in the tournament.

Group A	Group B
(Cricket West Indies) Combined Campuses	Canada^{†}
(Cricket West Indies) Windward Islands	(England) Hampshire^{†}
Jamaica	Barbados
Guyana	(Cricket West Indies) Leeward Islands
(England) Somerset^{†}	Trinidad and Tobago

^{†}Invited overseas team

== Results ==
=== Group stage ===
==== Group A ====
Pos	Team	Pld	W	L	NR	Pts	NRR
1	(Cricket West Indies) Windward Islands	4	3	1	0	12	0.375
2	Jamaica	4	2	2	0	8	1.317
3	(England) Somerset	4	2	2	0	8	−0.045
4	Guyana	4	2	2	0	8	−0.574
5	(Cricket West Indies) Combined Campuses and Colleges	4	1	3	0	4	−0.840

10 January (D/N)
Scorecard

Windward Islands (Cricket West Indies); 189/3 (20 overs)	v	(Cricket West Indies) Combined Campuses and Colleges; 161/8 (20 overs)

Windward Islands won by 28 runs
Sir Vivian Richards Stadium, North Sound, Antigua

10 January (D/N)
Scorecard

Jamaica; 115/7 (20 overs)	v	Guyana; 65 (17.3 overs)

Jamaica won by 50 runs
Sir Vivian Richards Stadium, North Sound, Antigua

12 January (D/N)
Scorecard

Guyana; 112/8 (20 overs)	v	(England) Somerset; 111 (20 overs)

Guyana won by 1 run
Sir Vivian Richards Stadium, North Sound, Antigua

12 January (D/N)
Scorecard

Jamaica; 138/4 (20 overs)	v	(Cricket West Indies) Combined Campuses and Colleges; 139/3 (19.0 overs)

Combined Campuses and Colleges won by 7 wickets
Sir Vivian Richards Stadium, North Sound, Antigua

14 January (D/N)
Scorecard

Somerset (England); 139/4 (20 overs)	v	(Cricket West Indies) Windward Islands; 122/9 (20 overs)

Somerset won by 17 runs
Sir Vivian Richards Stadium, North Sound, Antigua

14 January (D/N)
Scorecard

Combined Campuses and Colleges (Cricket West Indies); 175/7 (20 overs)	v	Guyana; 178/8 (19.4 overs)

Guyana won by 2 wickets
Sir Vivian Richards Stadium, North Sound, Antigua

18 January (D/N)
Scorecard

Jamaica; 85/1 (6 overs)	v	(England) Somerset; 24/8 (6 overs)

Jamaica won by 61 runs
Kensington Oval, Bridgetown, Barbados

18 January (D/N)
Scorecard

Windward Islands (Cricket West Indies); 138/8 (20 overs)	v	Guyana; 136/9 (20 overs)

Windward Islands won by 2 runs
Kensington Oval, Bridgetown, Barbados

20 January (D/N)
Scorecard

Somerset (England); 165/4 (20 overs)	v	(Cricket West Indies) Combined Campuses and Colleges; 123/7 (20 overs)

Somerset won by 42 runs
Kensington Oval, Bridgetown, Barbados

20 January (D/N)
Scorecard

Windward Islands (Cricket West Indies); 165/5 (20 overs)	v	Jamaica; 148/5 (20 overs)

Windward Islands won by 17 runs
Kensington Oval, Bridgetown, Barbados

==== Group B ====
Pos	Team	Pld	W	L	NR	Pts	NRR
1	Trinidad and Tobago	4	3	0	1	13	1.800
2	(England) Hampshire	4	2	1	1	9	0.383
3	Barbados	4	2	2	0	8	−0.146
4	Canada	4	1	3	0	4	−0.455
5	(Cricket West Indies) Leeward Islands	4	1	3	0	4	−1.147

11 January (D/N)
Scorecard

Canada; 129/7 (20 overs)	v	(England) Hampshire; 106/8 (20 overs)

Canada won by 23 runs
Sir Vivian Richards Stadium, North Sound, Antigua

11 January (D/N)
Scorecard

Leeward Islands (Cricket West Indies); 112/6 (20 overs)	v	Barbados; 116/6 (19.2 overs)

Barbados won by 4 wickets
Sir Vivian Richards Stadium, North Sound, Antigua

13 January (D/N)
Scorecard

Hampshire (England); 136/3 (20 overs)	v	Barbados; 136 (20 overs)

Match tied; Hampshire won by Super Over
Sir Vivian Richards Stadium, North Sound, Antigua

13 January (D/N)
Scorecard

Trinidad and Tobago; 153/5 (20 overs)	v	(Cricket West Indies) Leeward Islands; 97 (18.4 overs)

Trinidad and Tobago won by 56 runs
Sir Vivian Richards Stadium, North Sound, Antigua

15 January (D/N)
Scorecard

Hampshire (England); 156/5 (20 overs)	v	(Cricket West Indies) Leeward Islands; 110 (19.5 overs)

Hampshire won by 46 runs
Sir Vivian Richards Stadium, North Sound, Antigua

15 January (D/N)
Scorecard

Canada; 128/5 (20 overs)	v	Trinidad and Tobago; 129/5 (20 overs)

Trinidad and Tobago won by 5 wickets
Sir Vivian Richards Stadium, North Sound, Antigua

19 January (D/N)
Scorecard

Trinidad and Tobago; 70/4 (9.5 overs)	v	(England) Hampshire

No result
Kensington Oval, Bridgetown, Barbados

19 January (D/N)
Scorecard

Barbados; 139/7 (20 overs)	v	Canada; 29/5 (6 overs)

Barbados won by 33 runs (D/L)
Kensington Oval, Bridgetown, Barbados

21 January (D/N)
Scorecard

Leeward Islands (Cricket West Indies); 161/2 (20 overs)	v	Canada; 142/7 (20 overs)

Leeward Islands won by 19 runs
Kensington Oval, Bridgetown, Barbados

21 January (D/N)
Scorecard

Trinidad and Tobago; 166/7 (20 overs)	v	Barbados; 115/9 (20 overs)

Trinidad and Tobago won by 51 runs
Kensington Oval, Bridgetown, Barbados

== Knockout stage ==
=== Brackets ===
Semifinals
A1	(Cricket West Indies) Windward Islands	162/7 (20 ov)
B2	(England) Hampshire	166/4 (20 ov)
B1	Trinidad and Tobago	140/2 (17.5 ov)
A2	Jamaica	136/9 (20 ov)

Finals
B2	(England) Hampshire	111/8 (20 ov)
B1	Trinidad and Tobago	147/7 (20 ov)
Third place
A1	(Cricket West Indies) Windward Islands	144/9 (20 ov)
A2	Jamaica	153/8 (20 ov)

=== Semi-finals ===
22 January
16:00 (D/N)
Scorecard

Hampshire (England); 166/4 (20 overs)	v	(Cricket West Indies) Windward Islands; 162/7 (20 overs)
Johann Myburgh 88 (58); Mervin Matthew 1/18 (2 overs)		Andre Fletcher 44 (43); Hamza Riazuddin 4/15 (4 overs)

Hampshire won by 4 runs
Kensington Oval, Bridgetown, Barbados
Umpires: Peter Nero and Joel Wilson
Player of the match: Johann Myburgh (Ham)

- Hampshire won the toss and elected to bat.

22 January
20:00 (D/N)
Scorecard

Jamaica; 136/9 (20 overs)	v	Trinidad and Tobago; 140/2 (17.5 overs)
Andre Russell 36 (17); Sunil Narine 2/21 (4 overs)		Lendl Simmons 51 (49); Jerome Taylor 1/30 (4 overs)

Trinidad and Tobago won by 8 wickets
Kensington Oval, Bridgetown, Barbados
Umpires: Gregory Brathwaite and Billy Doctrove
Player of the match: Lendl Simmons (T&T)

- Jamaica won the toss and elected to bat.

=== Third-place playoff ===
23 January
16:00 (D/N)
Scorecard

Jamaica; 153/8 (20 overs)	v	(Cricket West Indies) Windward Islands; 144/9 (20 overs)
Danza Hyatt 43* (21); Nelon Pascal 3/21 (4 overs)		Linden Lawrence 36 (27); David Bernard 3/25 (4 overs)

Jamaica won by 9 runs
Kensington Oval, Bridgetown, Barbados
Umpires: Nigel Duguid and Peter Nero
Player of the match: Danza Hyatt (Jam)

- Jamaica won the toss and elected to bat.

=== The Final ===
23 January
20:00 (D/N)
Scorecard

Trinidad and Tobago; 147/7 (20 overs)	v	(England) Hampshire; 111/8 (20 overs)
Darren Bravo 41 (28); Danny Briggs 2/9 (4 overs)		Benny Howell 28* (31); Jason Mohammed 2/6 (2.1 overs)

Trinidad and Tobago won by 36 runs
Kensington Oval, Bridgetown, Barbados
Umpires: Gregory Brathwaite and Norman Malcolm
Player of the match: Darren Bravo (T&T)

- Trinidad and Tobago won the toss and elected to bat.

== Statistics ==
=== Highest team totals ===
The following table listed the six highest team scores during this season.

Team	Total	Opponent	Ground
(Cricket West Indies) Windward Islands	189/3	(Cricket West Indies) Combined Campuses and Colleges	Sir Vivian Richards Stadium, North Sound, Antigua
Guyana	178/8	(Cricket West Indies) Combined Campuses and Colleges	Sir Vivian Richards Stadium, North Sound, Antigua
(Cricket West Indies) Combined Campuses and Colleges	175/7	Guyana	Sir Vivian Richards Stadium, North Sound, Antigua
Trinidad and Tobago	166/7	Barbados	Kensington Oval, Bridgetown, Barbados
(England) Hampshire	166/4	(Cricket West Indies) Windward Islands	Kensington Oval, Bridgetown, Barbados
(England) Somerset	165/4	(Cricket West Indies) Combined Campuses and Colleges	Kensington Oval, Bridgetown, Barbados

Last Updated 24 January 2011.

=== Most runs ===
The top five highest run scorers (total runs) in the season are included in this table.

Player	Team	Runs	Inns	Avg	S/R	HS	100s	50s	4s	6s
Marlon Samuels	Jamaica	253	6	63.25	122.81	80*	0	2	15	14
Lendl Simmons	Trinidad and Tobago	249	6	41.50	111.65	83	0	3	15	15
Johann Myburgh	(England) Hampshire	223	6	44.60	121.85	88	0	2	15	12
Andre Fletcher	(Cricket West Indies) Windward Islands cricket team	210	6	35.00	117.31	88	0	1	15	7
Darren Bravo	Trinidad and Tobago	192	6	48.00	130.61	70	0	1	14	8

Last Updated 24 January 2011.

=== Highest scores ===
This table contains the top five highest scores of the season made by a batsman in a single innings.

Player	Team	Score	Balls	4s	6s	Opponent	Ground
Andre Fletcher	(Cricket West Indies) Windward Islands	88	59	5	4	(Cricket West Indies) Combined Campuses and Colleges	Sir Vivian Richards Stadium, North Sound, Antigua
Johann Myburgh	(England) Hampshire	88	58	5	6	(Cricket West Indies) Windward Islands	Kensington Oval, Bridgetown, Barbados
Lendl Simmons	Trinidad and Tobago	83	62	5	5	(Cricket West Indies) Leeward Islands	Sir Vivian Richards Stadium, North Sound, Antigua
Marlon Samuels	Jamaica	80*	54	5	5	(Cricket West Indies) Combined Campuses and Colleges	Sir Vivian Richards Stadium, North Sound, Antigua
Johann Myburgh	(England) Hampshire	76	57	4	6	(Cricket West Indies) Leeward Islands	Sir Vivian Richards Stadium, North Sound, Antigua

Last Updated 24 January 2011.

=== Most wickets ===
The following table contains the five leading wicket-takers of the season.

Player	Team	Wkts	Mts	Ave	S/R	Econ	BBI
Hamza Riazuddin	(England) Hampshire	12	6	10.08	11.5	5.26	4/15
Simon Jones	(England) Hampshire	12	6	10.25	11.0	5.59	4/10
Krishmar Santokie	Jamaica	9	5	10.44	10.8	5.75	3/29
Nelon Pascal	(Cricket West Indies) Windward Islands	9	6	16.11	14.0	6.90	3/21
Ravi Rampaul	Trinidad and Tobago	8	6	13.87	14.0	5.94	5/9

Last Updated 24 January 2011.

=== Best bowling figures ===
This table lists the top five players with the best bowling figures in the season.

Player	Team	Overs	Figures	Opponent	Ground
Ravi Rampaul	Trinidad and Tobago	3.4	5/9	(Cricket West Indies) Leeward Islands	Sir Vivian Richards Stadium, North Sound, Antigua
Ashley Nurse	Barbados	4.0	5/26	Trinidad and Tobago	Sir Vivian Richards Stadium, North Sound, Antigua
Javon Searles	Barbados	3.0	4/5	Canada	Kensington Oval, Bridgetown, Barbados
Simon Jones	(England) Hampshire	4.0	4/10	Barbados	Sir Vivian Richards Stadium, North Sound, Antigua
Hamza Riazuddin	(England) Hampshire	4.0	4/15	(Cricket West Indies) Windward Islands	Kensington Oval, Bridgetown, Barbados

Last Updated 24 January 2011.
