= Dennis Baldry =

English cricketer (1931–2026)

Personal information
- Full name: Dennis Oliver Baldry
- Born: 26 December 1931; Acton, Middlesex, England
- Died: 26 October 2026 (aged 94)
- Batting: Right-handed
- Bowling: Right-arm off break

Domestic team information
- Years: Team
- 1953–1958: Middlesex
- 1956–1959: Marylebone Cricket Club
- 1959–1963: Hampshire

Career statistics
Competition	First-class	List A
Matches	139	1
Runs scored	4,661	7
Batting average	20.90	7.00
100s/50s	–/–	–/–
Top score	151	7
Balls bowled	5,853	90
Wickets	83	4
Bowling average	37.06	17.50
5 wickets in innings	1	–
10 wickets in match	–	–
Best bowling	7/76	4/70
Catches/stumpings	63/–	–/–
- Source: Cricinfo, 10 January 2010

Dennis Oliver Baldry (26 December 1931 – 29 October 2026) was an English first-class cricketer who played as an all-rounder for both Middlesex and Hampshire. Debuting in first-class cricket for Middlesex in 1953, he played irregularly for the county until 1958. He moved to Hampshire in 1959, and was a member of their 1961 County Championship winning team. He played for Hampshire in first-class cricket until 1962, and played in their inaugural List A one-day match in the 1963 Gillette Cup. A right-handed batsman and right-arm off break bowler, he scored over 4,600 runs in 139 first-class matches, and took 83 wickets.

== Cricket career ==
=== Middlesex ===
Baldry was born in Acton in December 1931. A protégé of Middlesex coach J. W. Hearne, he made his debut in first-class cricket for Middlesex against Essex at Westcliff-on-Sea in the 1953 County Championship. Two years would elapse before his next appearance against Derbyshire in the 1955 County Championship, a season in which he made sixteen appearances in the Middlesex team as a middle order batsman and off-break bowler. He featured seven times for Middlesex in 1956, in addition to playing for the Marylebone Cricket Club (MCC) against Cambridge University. In 1957, he made fourteen appearances for Middlesex, and again played for the MCC against Cambridge University. He scored 461 runs at an average of 17.73 during the season, and made his highest score for Middlesex, with 61 against Worcestershire. His final season with Middlesex came in 1958, in which he made eleven appearances. Whilst attending Fenner's as Middlesex's twelfth man against Cambridge University in 1958, Baldry was called upon to deputise as umpire when Frank Lee was taken ill. In 49 matches for Middlesex, he scored 1,155 runs at an average of 14.62, and took 11 wickets.

=== Hampshire ===
Shortly before the start of the 1959 season, Baldry joined Hampshire as a replacement for the retired Alan Rayment. Making his debut against Glamorgan at Portsmouth in June, he became only the second Hampshire debutant to score a century (after Cecil Abercrombie in 1913), when he made 151 in Hampshire's first innings. He followed this up with a century for the MCC against Kent at Lord's. Making 29 appearances for Hampshire in his first season with the county, he scored 1,605 runs at an average of 29.72, making three centuries. He also took 31 wickets at a bowling average of 31.13, claiming what would be his only five wicket haul with 7 for 76 against Lancashire at Old Trafford. Alongside playing for Hampshire in 1959, he also made a final first-class appearance for the MCC against Oxford University, and played for Arthur Gilligan's personal eleven against the touring Indians, and for an England XI against the Commonwealth XI. Before the County Championship match against Kent in May 1959, Baldry was awarded his county cap. After his successful start to the season, he was sent a humorous telegram by Middlesex captain George Mann urging him to "come home at once!".

Baldry made 24 appearances for Hampshire in 1960, scoring 678 runs at an average of 21.18. With the arrival of Danny Livingstone, he lost his position at number four in the Hampshire batting order. He was a member of the team which won the 1961 County Championship, which was Hampshire's first County Championship triumph. Although his batting return during the season diminished, Baldry played important roles at various times early in the season. Against Yorkshire he scored an unbeaten 84, having come to the wicket with Hampshire in trouble at 45 for 5, with his innings helping to guide Hampshire to a draw. Later against Nottinghamshire, he scored an unbeaten 61 and claimed the final Nottinghamshire wicket when he ran out Michael Morgan with a direct throw, with just three minutes remaining in the match. Following a run of low scores, he had lost his place in the team by the end of the season to Mike Barnard. He was seldom used in 1962, making eleven first-class appearances, in which he scored 441 runs at an average of 25.94. In March 1963, he announced his intention to retire, having decided to take up a full-time position working for a Hampshire-based firm. However, he did return as an amateur to play in Hampshire's inaugural List A one-day match against Derbyshire in the 1963 Gillette Cup, replacing the injured Derek Shackleton. He took 4 for 70 bowling seamers, the best figures by a Hampshire bowler. In 85 first-class matches for Hampshire, he scored 3,342 runs at an average of 24.75, scoring three centuries. With the ball, he took 70 wickets at an average of 36.77.

He later played club cricket in the Southampton area for many years, including for the Trojans. At the date of his death, he was Hampshire's oldest surviving cricketer.

== Death ==
Baldry died on 29 October 2026, aged 94.
