= Wacey =

Wacey is both a given name and a surname. Notable people with the name include:

- Roy Wacey (born 1937), English cricket player
- Wacey Hamilton (born 1990), Canadian ice hockey player
- Wacey Rabbit (born 1986), Canadian ice hockey player
