= Ditchmore Lane =

Cricket ground in Stevenage, Hertfordshire, England

Coordinates: 51°54′23.04″N 0°12′19.14″W

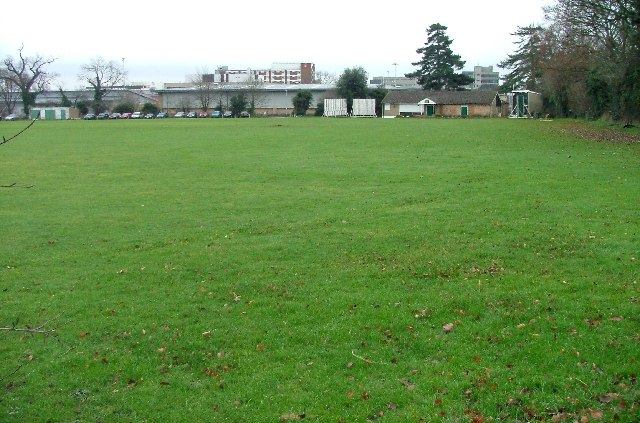

Ground information
- Location: Stevenage, Hertfordshire
- Establishment: 1921 (first recorded match)

Team information
Hertfordshire	(1921–2000)
- As of 25 July 2010; Source: Ground profile

Ditchmore Lane is a cricket ground in Stevenage, Hertfordshire, England. The first recorded match on the ground was in 1921, when Hertfordshire played their first Minor Counties Championship match which was against Buckinghamshire. From 1921 to 2000, the ground played host to 41 Minor Counties Championship matches and 2 MCCA Knockout Trophy matches.

The ground hosted a single List-A match in the 1969 Gillette Cup between Hertfordshire and Devon.

In local domestic cricket, Digswell Park is the home ground of Stevenage Cricket Club who play in Division 2A of the Saracens Hertfordshire Premier Cricket League as of 2023. The cricket club has existed since 1878 and is the oldest sports club in Stevenage.
