= Johann Myburgh =

South African cricketer

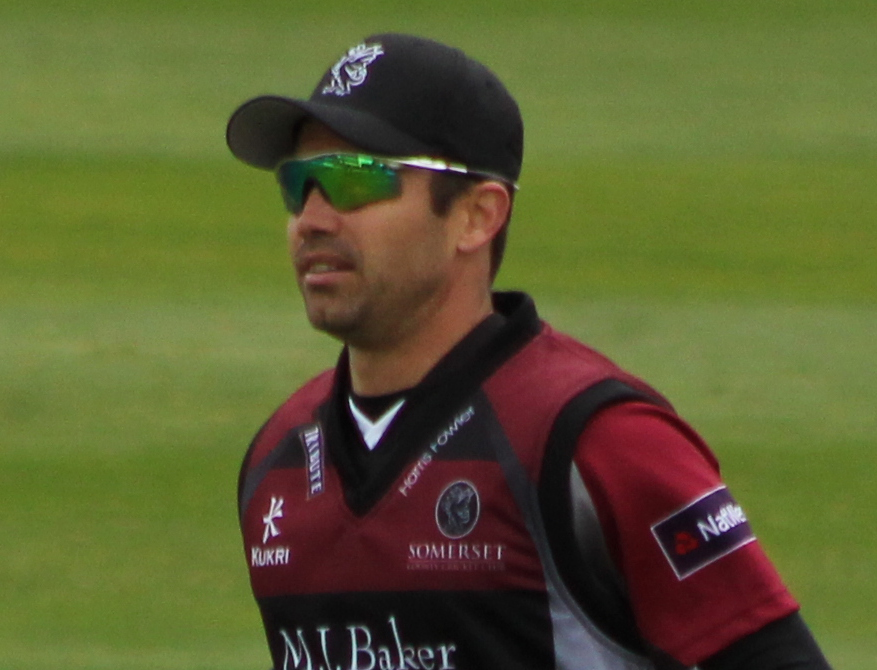

Personal information
- Full name: Johannes Gerhardus Myburgh
- Born: 22 October 1980 (age 46); Pretoria, Transvaal Province, South Africa
- Batting: Right-handed
- Bowling: Right-arm off break
- Role: Batsman
- Relatives: Stephan Myburgh (brother)

Domestic team information
- Years: Team
- 1997/98–2006/07: Northerns
- 2004/05–2006/07: Titans
- 2007/08–2009/10: Canterbury
- 2011: Hampshire
- 2012: Durham
- 2014–2018: Somerset (squad no. 6)
- FC debut: 13 November 1997 Northerns B v Western Province B
- Last FC: 17 June 2016 Somerset v Nottinghamshire
- LA debut: 3 March 2000 Northerns v Griqualand West
- Last LA: 6 June 2018 Somerset v Hampshire

Career statistics
Competition	FC	LA	T20
Matches	108	118	92
Runs scored	6,841	2,949	2,056
Batting average	40.96	29.49	28.55
100s/50s	16/39	1/19	1/11
Top score	203	112	103*
Balls bowled	4,345	1,790	386
Wickets	45	25	11
Bowling average	48.00	61.00	43.45
5 wickets in innings	0	0	0
10 wickets in match	0	0	0
Best bowling	4/56	2/22	3/16
Catches/stumpings	61/–	25/–	23/–
- Source: CricketArchive, 16 August 2018

Johannes Gerhardus Myburgh (born 22 October 1980) is a former British-South African cricketer who played domestic cricket in England for Somerset County Cricket Club.

A right-handed batsman and occasional off break bowler, Myburgh was also a talented fielder, and is the current holder of the record for the youngest scorer of a double-century in South African domestic cricket, breaking the record of Graeme Pollock in 1997 when aged 17.

Though born in South Africa, he emigrated to New Zealand in 2007, where he planned to qualify for the national team. Myburgh has since abandoned his New Zealand ambitions and moved to the UK, where he has played for Hampshire and Durham. He joined his third English county, Somerset, in 2014.

In 2021, he was named as Head Coach of the South East Stars, leading them to victory in the inaugural edition of the Charlotte Edwards Cup.

== Career ==
=== South Africa ===
Myburgh was born in Pretoria, along with his brother Stephan, who has played international cricket for the Netherlands. Myburgh made his first-class debut in 1997 for Northerns B. Myburgh played four Under-19 Test matches and seventeen Under-19 ODIs for South Africa, including all six of the team's matches during the 1998 World Cup, which took place in South Africa.

After two years playing for Northerns B, Myburgh was elevated to the full Northerns side for the 1999/00 season. On 7 January 2001, during a one-day game, he scored an opening partnership of 156 with Jacques Rudolph before being dismissed for 95. On 15 October 2004 he scored 102 against Easterns during a first-class match, and on 9 January 2005 he scored 100* against Border. Myburgh first played for the Titans, the franchise formed from the merger of the Northerns and Easterns, in the 2004/05 season. Late in 2005, Myburgh scored 56* against the Warriors, and he became the Titans' leading run scorer in the Standard Bank Cup in 2005/06, hitting 237 runs in ten matches with a high score of 59*.

In 2006, playing for Northerns, Myburgh scored a 50 as they faced Western Province on 8 April, and then scored another 55-ball 50 against the South African national cricket team in September.

=== New Zealand ===
In 2007, Myburgh emigrated to New Zealand, in order to replace the retiring Nathan Astle at Canterbury. Myburgh was aware that he needed to play only three seasons in New Zealand to qualify for their national team. He quickly cemented his place in the Canterbury side when he scored 148* off 154 balls with four sixes as his team moved on to 344/1, and followed this with another century in December, a fifty in January 2008, and a 98-ball 87 in February against England.

=== England ===
After three years with Canterbury, Myburgh was originally due to sign for Auckland for the 2010/11 season, but he declined his contract offer in order to pursue a career in England, to where he relocated, living with his English wife. If he had played one further season in New Zealand, he would have been eligible to play international cricket for New Zealand. In contrast, he would only become eligible for the England team after four seasons in England. Myburgh joined Hampshire as a Kolpak registration, making his debut for the county in the 2010–11 Caribbean Twenty20, in which the county ended as runners-up. After one season with Hampshire, Myburgh was released by the county, having not played for the first team since May. He later signed for Durham for their 2012 Friends Life t20 campaign. Myburgh's contract with Durham was extended until the end of the season, following impressive performances during the FLt20.

Myburgh spent much of the summer of 2013 playing club cricket as captain of Sutton CC, a team in the Surrey Premier League. He had previously played for the same side in three matches in 2003.

Myburgh signed for Somerset, his third English county, for the 2014 season. He rejoined Director of Cricket Dave Nosworthy, who was previously coach for the Titans and Canterbury whilst Myburgh played for those teams. Myburgh scored a century on the opening day of the 2015 season at home to Middlesex and enjoyed success as an opener in the Natwest T20 Blast in the same season. He signed a white-ball contract for 2018, to play in the One-Day Cup and the T20 Blast. In August 2018, Myburgh announced his intention to retire at the end of the season.
