= Keith Gillhouley =

English cricketer (1934–2026)

Personal information
- Born: 8 August 1934; Crosland Moor, Huddersfield, Yorkshire, England
- Died: 5 March 2026 (aged 91); Leeds, Yorkshire, England
- Batting: Right-handed
- Bowling: Left-arm orthodox spin
- Role: Bowler

Domestic team information
- Years: Team
- 1961: Yorkshire
- 1963–1966: Nottinghamshire

Career statistics
Competition	First-class	List A
Matches	108	2
Runs scored	2,051	10
Batting average	14.86	5.00
100s/50s	0/7	0/0
Top score	75*	9
Balls bowled	17,070	144
Wickets	255	4
Bowling average	27.14	19.50
5 wickets in innings	8	0
10 wickets in match	0	–
Best bowling	7/82	4/33
Catches/stumpings	60/–	1/–
- Source: CricketArchive, 3 November 2024

Keith Gillhouley (8 August 1934 – 5 March 2026) was an English first-class cricketer, who played in 24 matches for Yorkshire County Cricket Club in 1961, 83 for Nottinghamshire from 1963 to 1966, and one for Marylebone Cricket Club (MCC) in 1963.

== Biography ==
A slow left arm bowler, he was a success with Yorkshire in his debut season of 1961, taking 77 wickets at 22.10, with his career best analysis of 7 for 82 against Middlesex.

Gillhouley was almost as prolific in his first season at Trent Bridge, taking 74 wickets at 27.82, with a best of 6 for 95. After that his career went into a decline, with 28 wickets at 30.78 in 1965, and only 10 at 57.90 in his final year for Notts. In all first-class cricket, he took 255 wickets in 108 first-class matches, at an average of 27.14. He took 5 wickets in an innings eight times. Batting right-handed, he also scored 2,051 first-class runs at 14.86, with a best of 75 not out against Worcestershire.

He played two one day games for Nottinghamshire in the Gillette Cup, taking four wickets at 19.50, all in one spell against his native Yorkshire.

After his stint at Nottinghamshire, Gillhouley and his wife Mitzi moved back to Yorkshire to live in Guiseley. He died on 5 March 2026, at the age of 91.
