= Robert Healey (cricketer) =

English cricketer

Personal information
- Full name: Robert Dennis Healey
- Born: 10 February 1934 (age 92); Plymouth, Devon, England
- Batting: Right-handed
- Bowling: Right-arm fast-medium

Domestic team information
- Years: Team
- 1964: Combined Services
- 1953–1969: Devon

Career statistics
Competition	First-class	List A
Matches	2	1
Runs scored	14	3
Batting average	3.50	3.00
100s/50s	–/–	–/–
Top score	7	3
Balls bowled	294	67
Wickets	–	6
Bowling average	–	2.33
5 wickets in innings	–	1
10 wickets in match	–	–
Best bowling	–	6/14
Catches/stumpings	–/–	2/–
- Source: Cricinfo, 12 February 2011

Robert Dennis Healey (born 10 February 1934) is a former English cricketer. Healey was a right-handed batsman who bowled right-arm fast-medium. He was born in Plymouth, Devon.

Healey made his debut for Devon in the 1953 Minor Counties Championship against Cornwall. From 1953 to 1969, he represented the county in 39 Championship matches, the last of which came against Dorset. He played a single List A match for the county against Hertfordshire in the 1969 Gillette Cup. In this match he scored a 3 runs before being dismissed by Brian Collins. It was with the ball that he starred, taking 6/14 and earning himself the man-of-the-match award.

Healey served in the Royal Navy, which accounted for his infrequent appearances for Devon. It was in 1964 that he made his first-class debut for a Combined Services cricket team against Cambridge University. He played his second and final first-class match in the same season against Oxford University. In his 2 first-class matches he scored 14 runs at batting average of 3.50, with a high score of 7. With the ball he bowled 49 wicket-less overs.
