= 2010 Caribbean Twenty20 =

- Administrator: WICB
- Cricket format: Twenty20
- Tournament format(s): Round-robin and knockout
- Host: West Indies
- Champions: Guyana (1st title)
- Participants: 8
- Matches: 16
- Most runs: (Jamaica) Marlon Samuels (210)
- Most wickets: (Guyana) Lennox Cush (11)
- Official website: www.windiescricket.com

The 2010 Caribbean Twenty20 season was the debut season of the Caribbean Twenty20, established by the West Indies Cricket Board in 2010. The season was held in Barbados and Trinidad between 22 and 31 July 2010. It featured all seven West Indies first-class cricket domestic teams and one overseas team – Canada.

The competition started with a group stage, in which the teams are divided into two groups of four. Each group competed in a round robin and those matches were followed by two semi-finals, a third-place playoff and a final. The top domestic team from the tournament will qualify for the 2010 Champions League Twenty20.

Guyana won the tournament, defeating Barbados in the final by one wicket with one ball remaining. Trinidad and Tobago came third and Jamaica came fourth. The tournament was greatly affected by the weather conditions at the venues. Out of the eight games played in Trinidad, three matches were abandoned and three matches – including a semi-final and the third-place playoff – were shortened due to heavy rain.

== Background ==
The previous domestic Twenty20 tournament held by the West Indies Cricket Board was the Stanford 20/20, which ended in 2008 after its sponsor Allen Stanford was charged with fraud and arrested in June 2009. The creation of the Caribbean Twenty20 tournament coincides with the 2010 Champions League Twenty20 tournament, which starts less than two months after. The top domestic team from the tournament will qualify for the Champions League as the sole representative of the West Indies. They will be the tenth and last team to qualify, as all other teams qualified before May 2010.

Cricket in the West Indies was at a time of decline, indicated by the criticism received when they hosted the 2007 Cricket World Cup and the failure of the Stanford 20/20. With the slogan "Bring It Back", the Caribbean Twenty20 was an attempt to revitalise interest in the sport with a focus on the Twenty20 format, which was popular amongst audiences in the 18–34 age-group. This follows the success of the Trinidad and Tobago national cricket team at the 2009 Champions League Twenty20, where they were runners-up, and the West Indies' successful hosting of the 2010 ICC World Twenty20.

== Venues ==
All matches were played at the following two grounds:

Bridgetown, Barbados	Port of Spain, Trinidad
Kensington Oval	Queen's Park Oval
Capacity: 15,000	Capacity: 25,000
2010 Caribbean Twenty20 is located in the Caribbean

== Format ==
The tournament consisted of 16 matches, and was divided into a group stage and a knockout stage. If a match ended in a tie, a Super Over would have been played to determine the winner. The group stage had the teams divided into two equal groups, with each playing a round-robin tournament. The top two teams of each group advanced to the knockout stage. The knockout stage consisted of two semi-finals, a third-place playoff and the grand final. The semi-finals had the top team of one group facing the second from the other. The winners of the semi-finals played in the grand final to determine the winner of the competition, while the losers of the semi-finals played the third-place playoff.

Points in the group stage were awarded as follows:

Points
Results	Points
Win	4 points
No result	1 point
Loss	0 points

=== Prize money ===
The total prize money for the competition was US$53,000. The most man of the match in each of the 16 matches received $500 and a plaque. The prize money was distributed as follows:

- $4,000 – Fourth place
- $6,000 – Third place
- $10,000 – Runners-up
- $25,000 – Winners

== Teams ==
Group A	Group B
Canada *	Barbados
Jamaica	(Cricket West Indies) Combined C&C
Leeward Islands	Guyana
Trinidad and Tobago	Windward Islands

* (overseas team)

== Results ==
All times shown are in Eastern Caribbean Time (UTC−04).

=== Group stage ===
==== Group A ====
Pos	Team	Pld	W	L	NR	Pts	NRR
1	Trinidad and Tobago	3	3	0	0	12	1.869
2	Jamaica	3	2	1	0	8	0.318
3	Leeward Islands	3	0	2	1	1	−0.730
4	Canada	3	0	2	1	1	−2.565

Source: Cricinfo

22 July (D/N)
Scorecard

Canada; 110/8 (20 overs)	v	Trinidad and Tobago; 111/1 (14.1 overs)

Trinidad and Tobago won by 9 wickets
Kensington Oval, Bridgetown, Barbados

22 July (D/N)
Scorecard

Leeward Islands; 124/7 (20 overs)	v	Jamaica; 126/1 (17.4 overs)

Jamaica won by 9 wickets
Kensington Oval, Bridgetown, Barbados

24 July (D/N)
Scorecard

Canada; 101/7 (20 overs)	v	Jamaica; 102/1 (13 overs)

Jamaica won by 9 wickets
Kensington Oval, Bridgetown, Barbados

24 July (D/N)
Scorecard

Leeward Islands; 161/7 (20 overs)	v	Trinidad and Tobago; 162/5 (19 overs)

Trinidad and Tobago won by 5 wickets
Kensington Oval, Bridgetown, Barbados

28 July (D/N)
Scorecard

Canada	v	Leeward Islands

Match abandoned
Queen's Park Oval, Port of Spain, Trinidad

28 July (D/N)
Scorecard

Trinidad and Tobago; 157/7 (18 overs)	v	Jamaica; 108 (17.1 overs)

Trinidad and Tobago won by 49 runs
Queen's Park Oval, Port of Spain, Trinidad

==== Group B ====
Pos	Team	Pld	W	L	NR	Pts	NRR
1	Barbados	3	2	0	1	9	0.975
2	Guyana	3	2	0	1	9	—
3	(Cricket West Indies) Combined C&C	3	0	2	1	1	−0.162
4	Windward Islands	3	0	2	1	1	−1.185

Source: Cricinfo

23 July (D/N)
Scorecard

Windward Islands; 157/8 (20 overs)	v	Guyana; 160/5 (19.2 overs)

Guyana won by 5 wickets
Kensington Oval, Bridgetown, Barbados

23 July (D/N)
Scorecard

Barbados; 180/6 (20 overs)	v	(Cricket West Indies) Combined C&C; 180/5 (20 overs)

Match tied; Barbados won by Super Over
Kensington Oval, Bridgetown, Barbados

25 July
Scorecard

Combined C&C (Cricket West Indies); 142/9 (20 overs)	v	Guyana; 143/6 (19.2 overs)

Guyana won by 4 wickets
Kensington Oval, Bridgetown, Barbados

25 July (D/N)
Scorecard

Barbados; 159/6 (20 overs)	v	Windward Islands; 120/9 (20 overs)

Barbados won by 39 runs
Kensington Oval, Bridgetown, Barbados

29 July (D/N)
Scorecard

Barbados	v	Guyana

Match abandoned
Queen's Park Oval, Port of Spain, Trinidad

29 July (D/N)
Scorecard

Combined C&C (Cricket West Indies)	v	Windward Islands

Match abandoned
Queen's Park Oval, Port of Spain, Trinidad

== Knockout stage ==
=== Bracket ===
Semifinals
A1	Trinidad and Tobago	171 (18.5 ov)
B2	Guyana	175/7 (19 ov)
B1	Barbados	154/4 (18.5 ov)
A2	Jamaica	153/9 (20 ov)

Finals
B2	Guyana	135/9 (19.5 ov)
B1	Barbados	134/5 (20 ov)
Third place
A1	Trinidad and Tobago (D/L)	89/0 (10.1 ov)
A2	Jamaica	94/7 (14 ov)

=== Semi-finals ===
30 July
16:00 (D/N)
Scorecard

Guyana; 175/7 (19 overs)	v	Trinidad and Tobago; 171 (18.5 overs)
Travis Dowlin 59 (39); Kieron Pollard 4/31 (4 overs)		Dwayne Bravo 55 (20b, 1x4, 6x6); Royston Crandon 4/37 (3.5 overs)

Guyana won by 4 runs
Queen's Park Oval, Port of Spain, Trinidad
Umpires: Billy Doctrove and Norman Malcolm
Player of the match: Dwayne Bravo (T&T)

- Trinidad and Tobago won the toss and elected to field.
- Rain reduced the match to 19 overs per side.

30 July
20:00 (D/N)
Scorecard

Jamaica; 153/9 (20 overs)	v	Barbados; 154/4 (18.5 overs)
Danza Hyatt 89 (50b, 4x4, 8x6); Larry Babb 2/17 (1.4 overs)		Jonathan Carter 54 (43); Krishmar Santokie 2/12 (4 overs)

Barbados won by 6 wickets
Queen's Park Oval, Port of Spain, Trinidad
Umpires: Goaland Greaves and Peter Nero
Player of the match: Danza Hyatt (JAM)

- Jamaica won the toss and elected to bat.

=== Third-place playoff ===
31 July
16:00 (D/N)
Scorecard

Jamaica; 94/7 (14 overs)	v	Trinidad and Tobago; 89/0 (10.1 overs)
Carlton Baugh 40 (29); Kevon Cooper 2/8 (3 overs)		Adrian Barath 39* (34); David Bernard 0/12 (2 overs)

Trinidad and Tobago won by 10 wickets (D/L)
Queen's Park Oval, Port of Spain, Trinidad
Umpires: Clyde Duncan and Clancy Mack
Player of the match: Kevon Cooper (T&T)

- Jamaica won the toss and elected to bat.
- Rain initially reduced the match to 14 overs per side. Rain further reduced Trinidad and Tobago's innings to 13 overs with a target of 89 runs according to the Duckworth–Lewis method.

=== Final ===
31 July
20:00 (D/N)
Scorecard

Barbados; 134/5 (20 overs)	v	Guyana; 135/9 (19.5 overs)
Jonathan Carter 57* (62); Devendra Bishoo 2/14 (4 overs)		Jonathan Foo 42* (17); Ashley Nurse 5/36 (4 overs)

Guyana won by 1 wicket
Queen's Park Oval, Port of Spain, Trinidad
Umpires: Billy Doctrove and Norman Malcolm
Player of the match: Jonathan Foo (GUY)

- Barbados won the toss and elected to bat.

== Television coverage ==
Country/Continent	Broadcaster(s)
Africa	ESPN
Australia	ESPN
Caribbean	ESPN, Caribbean Media Corporation
Middle East	ESPN
New Zealand	ESPN
United Kingdom	ESPN

== See also ==
- Stanford 20/20
