= Caribbean Twenty20 =

Cricket Tournament

2010 Caribbean Twenty20
- Countries: West Indies
- Administrator: WICB
- Format: Twenty20
- First edition: 2010
- Latest edition: 2012–13
- Tournament format: Round-robin and knockout
- Number of teams: 7
- Current champion: Trinidad and Tobago
- Most successful: Trinidad and Tobago (3 titles)
- Qualification: Champions League Twenty20
- Website: ct20.windiescricket.com

The Caribbean Twenty20 was an annual tournament Twenty20 cricket tournament in the West Indies that was held four times from 2010 to 2013. The top performing domestic team qualified for the Champions League Twenty20 tournament. It was replaced by the Caribbean Premier League, whose first season began in July 2013.

== History ==
The previous domestic Twenty20 tournament held by the West Indies Cricket Board was the Stanford 20/20, which ended in 2008 after its sponsor Allen Stanford was charged with fraud and arrested in June 2009. The creation of the Caribbean Twenty20 tournament coincides with the 2010 Champions League Twenty20 tournament, which started less than two months after. The top domestic team from the tournament qualified for the Champions League as the sole representative of the West Indies. They will be the tenth and last team to qualify, as all other teams qualified before May 2010.

Cricket in the West Indies was at a time of decline, indicated by the criticism received when they hosted the 2007 Cricket World Cup and the failure of the Stanford 20/20. With the slogan "Bring It Back", the Caribbean Twenty20 was an attempt to revitalize interest in the sport with a focus on the Twenty20 format, which was popular amongst audiences in the 18–34 age-group. This follows the success of the Trinidad and Tobago national cricket team at the 2009 Champions League Twenty20, where they were runners-up, and the West Indies' successful hosting of the 2010 ICC World Twenty20.

After the inaugural tournament, the tournament was moved to January 2011. Originally it was intended to run alongside a second Twenty20 competition in January called the Calypso Cup, which would have featured the four semi-finalists from the 2010 Caribbean Twenty20 as well as the two finalists from England's Friends Provident t20 competition and two other overseas teams (including possibly a third team from England). These plans were later cancelled. It was later announced that the two English county teams Somerset and Hampshire were to participate in the Caribbean Twenty20.

=== Replacement ===
In September 2012, outgoing chief executive of the WICB, Ernest Hilaire, revealed that the board was "in the advanced stages of discussions to have a commercial Twenty20 league in the region" with an unnamed investor and that he hopes to conclude a deal before his term ends on 30 September. He noted that the board will meet on 14 September to make decisions on the structure and organization of the Caribbean Twenty20 in January; to discuss the governance structure of the board and also discuss the planned league and to finalize its structure. The Federation of International Cricketers' Associations (FICA) and the West Indies Players' Association (WIPA) would also be brought in to discuss issues pertaining to players in relation to the planned T20 league.

On 13 December 2012, the WICB announced that they had finalized an agreement with Ajmal Khan founder of Verus International, a Barbados-based merchant bank, for the funding of the new franchise-based Twenty20 league which will be launched in 2013. The new Caribbean Premier League is likely to comprise six Caribbean city-based franchises as opposed to the current territorial set-up and the majority of the players are to come from the West Indies. As part of the agreement, the WICB will receive additional funding from Verus International for additional retainer contracts for players in addition to the 20 annual retainer contracts the board currently funds.

== Format ==
While the number of teams varied between editions, the format remained the same with a group stage and a knockout stage. If a match ends in a tie, a Super Over will be played to determine the winner. The group stage has the teams divided into two equal groups, with each playing a single round-robin tournament. The top two teams of each group advances to the advance to the knockout stage. The knockout stage consists of two semi-finals, a third-place playoff and the grand final. The semi-finals has the top team of one group facing the second from the other. The winners of the semi-finals play the grand final to determine the winner of the competition, while the losers of the semi-finals play the third-place playoff.

=== Prize money ===
The total prize money for the competition, in 2011, is US$125,000, with the winning team receiving US$62,500. The most outstanding player in each of the 16 matches will receive $500 and a plaque.

== Teams ==
=== Domestic teams ===
Team	1sts	2nds	3rds	4ths
Barbados	0	1	0	1
(Cricket West Indies) Combined Campuses and Colleges	0	0	0	0
Guyana	1	1	0	0
Jamaica	0	1	2	1
Leeward Islands	0	0	0	0
Trinidad and Tobago	3	0	1	0
Windward Islands	0	0	1	1

=== Invited overseas team ===
Team	Appearances			Wins	2nds	3rds	4ths
Team	Total	First	Latest	Wins	2nds	3rds	4ths
Canada	3	2010	2011–12	0	0	0	0
Netherlands	1	2011–12	2011–12	0	0	0	0
(England) Hampshire Royals	1	2010–11	2010–11	0	1	0	0
(England) Somerset	1	2010–11	2010–11	0	0	0	0
(England) Sussex Sharks	1	2011–12	2011–12	0	0	0	0

== Tournament results ==
Tournament	Final Venue	Final			Matches	Teams
Tournament	Final Venue	Winner	Result	Runner-up	Matches	Teams
2010; Details	Queen's Park Oval, Port of Spain, Trinidad	Guyana; 135 for 9 (19.5 overs)	won by 1 wicket Scorecard	Barbados; 134 for 5 (20 overs)	16	8
2010–11; Details	Kensington Oval, Bridgetown, Barbados	Trinidad and Tobago; 147 for 7 (20 overs)	won by 36 runs Scorecard	(England) Hampshire Royals; 111 for 8 (20 overs)	24	10
2011–12; Details	Kensington Oval, Bridgetown, Barbados	Trinidad and Tobago; 168 for 6 (20 overs)	won by 63 runs Scorecard	Jamaica; 105 for 5 (20 overs)	24	10
2012–13; Details	Beausejour Stadium, Gros Islet, St Lucia	Trinidad and Tobago; 120 for 1 (12.3 overs)	won by 9 wickets Scorecard	Guyana; 116 for 6 (20 overs)	23	7
