= Alan Day =

English cricketer

Alan Richard Day (12 November 1938 – 2022) was an English cricketer. He was a right-handed batsman.

Day was born in Muswell Hill in North London, and attended Aldenham School in Hertfordshire. He made his Minor Counties Championship debut in 1957 for Middlesex Second XI, playing two matches. He didn't play another match in the competition until 1962, when he joined Hertfordshire. He played regularly for Hertfordshire until 1975, and then for Berkshire from 1977 to 1980. He made his one-day debut in the 1966 Gillette Cup for Hertfordshire against Berkshire, and played five List A matches in total between 1966 and 1974. He top-scored with 53 when Hertfordshire beat Devon in the first round of the Gillette Cup in 1969.

Day's only first-class appearance came for Marylebone Cricket Club (MCC) in 1968, against Ireland. He scored 5 runs in the match, which finished in a draw. In all, he played 129 matches for MCC between 1961 and 1988. In club cricket for Hornsey Cricket Club and other cricket matches he scored more than 100 centuries.

Day died in 2022, aged 83.
