= Bob Hurst =

English cricketer

Robert Jack Hurst (29 December 1933 – 10 February 1996) was an English first-class cricketer active 1952–61 who played for Middlesex. He was born in Hampton Hill; died in Eastbourne.
