= Henry Tilly =

English cricketer (1932–2023)

Personal information
- Full name: Henry William Tilly
- Born: 25 May 1932; Edmonton, Middlesex, England
- Died: 17 November 2023 (aged 91); Derbyshire, England
- Batting: Right-handed
- Bowling: Right-arm fast-medium

Domestic team information
- Years: Team
- 1954–1961: Middlesex
- 1955–1960: Marylebone Cricket Club
- 1964–1971: Hertfordshire
- 1967: Minor Counties

Career statistics
Competition	First-class	List A
Matches	64	5
Runs scored	814	55
Batting average	10.85	11.00
100s/50s	0/0	0/0
Top score	49*	36
Balls bowled	8,571	264
Wickets	134	6
Bowling average	28.13	22.00
5 wickets in innings	4	0
10 wickets in match	0	0
Best bowling	6/33	2/8
Catches/stumpings	18/–	0/–
- Source: Cricinfo, 29 November 2023

Henry William Tilly (25 May 1932 – 17 November 2023) was an English cricketer.

Tilly was a right-handed batsman who bowled right-arm fast-medium. He was born at Edmonton, Middlesex.

Tilly died on 17 November 2023, at the age of 91.
