= Laurence Johnson (cricketer) =

English cricketer

Laurence Allen Johnson is a former English cricketer active from 1953 to 1972 who played for Northamptonshire (Northants). He was born in West Horsley, Surrey on 12 August 1936. He appeared in 156 first-class matches as a righthanded batsman and wicketkeeper. He scored 1,574 runs with a highest score of 50 and claimed 329 victims including 68 stumpings.
