= Bernard Hedges =

Welsh cricketer (1927–2014)

Personal information
- Born: 10 November 1927; Pontypridd, Wales
- Died: 8 February 2014 (aged 86); Mumbles, Swansea, Wales
- Batting: Right-handed

Domestic team information
- Years: Team
- 1950 to 1967: Glamorgan

Career statistics
Competition	First-class	List A
Matches	422	7
Runs scored	17733	250
Batting average	25.22	41.66
100s/50s	21/84	1/1
Top score	182	103*
Balls bowled	572	228
Wickets	3	8
Bowling average	86.66	16.75
5 wickets in innings	0	0
10 wickets in match	0	–
Best bowling	1-16	2/17
Catches/stumpings	200/0	4/0
- Source: Cricinfo

Bernard Hedges (10 November 1927 – 8 February 2014) was a Welsh cricketer who played for Glamorgan, making his first-class debut in 1950 and playing his last match in 1967. He played 422 first-class matches, all of them for Glamorgan.

Hedges played most of his cricket as an opening batsman despite starting his career in the middle order. He scored 17,733 first-class runs at an average of 25.22, with 21 centuries and a highest score of 182. His best season was 1961, when he scored 2026 runs at an average of 32.15.

Hedges was the first player to score a List A century for Glamorgan, doing so in 1963 with an innings of 103 against Somerset, helping Glamorgan to victory in its first List A match.

He died at his home on 8 February 2014.
