= Peter Stringer (cricketer) =

English cricketer (born 1943)

Peter Michael Stringer (born 23 February 1943, Gipton, Leeds, Yorkshire, England) is an English former first-class cricketer, who played nineteen matches for Yorkshire County Cricket Club from 1967 to 1969, and thirty seven games for Leicestershire from 1970 to 1972.

A right arm, fast medium bowler, he took 88 wickets at 31.50, with a best of 5 for 43 for Leicestershire against his old county Yorkshire. He scored 333 runs at 7.92, with a highest score of 22 against Sussex. He played 34 List A one day matches, taking 44 wickets at 22.36, with a best of 4 for 29 against Kent. He scored 80 one day runs at 8.00, with a highest score of 15 against Northamptonshire.
