= Jeff Jones (cricketer, born 1941) =

Welsh cricketer

Personal information
- Full name: Ivor Jeffrey Jones
- Born: 10 December 1941 (age 84); Dafen, Carmarthenshire, Wales
- Batting: Right-handed
- Bowling: Left-arm fast
- Relatives: Simon Jones (son)

International information
- National side: England
- Test debut: 21 January 1964 v India
- Last Test: 28 March 1968 v West Indies

Career statistics
Competition	Test	FC	LA
Matches	15	198	10
Runs scored	38	513	20
Batting average	4.75	3.97	6.66
100s/50s	0/0	0/0	0/0
Top score	16	21	7
Balls bowled	3,546	30,798	675
Wickets	44	511	22
Bowling average	40.20	25.98	14.50
5 wickets in innings	1	18	0
10 wickets in match	0	0	0
Best bowling	6/118	8/11	4/12
Catches/stumpings	4/–	46/–	2/–
- Source: CricInfo, 30 May 2019

Jeff Jones (born Ivor Jeffrey Jones, 10 December 1941) is a Welsh former cricketer, who took forty-four wickets in fifteen Test matches for the England cricket team between 1964 and 1968. His son, Simon Jones, also played Test cricket for England.

== First-class career ==
Jones was born in Dafen, Carmarthenshire. Cricket writer, Colin Bateman remarked, "South Wales is hardly renowned for fast bowlers but in 1960 a powerfully built left-armer joined the Glamorgan staff and caused undiluted excitement. Unassuming and popular, Jeff Jones introduced a destructive force into Glamorgan's cricket it had never seen before." He was a left-arm fast bowler who in 1965 took five wickets before conceding a run against Leicestershire at Grace Road, finishing with 8 for 11. The consensus was that there was no faster bowler in county cricket at that time. His wickets did not always come cheaply, as Jones was prone to be erratic at times, but at his best he was a handful for any batsman.

== International cricket ==
In the 1965-66 Ashes series in Australia, Jones was England's top wicket taker, with 15 (at 35.53), taking 6 for 118 in the Fourth Test. He made his highest Test score of 16 in the Third Test, adding 55 for the last wicket with David Allen. His most famous batting moment came in Georgetown, Guyana in 1967-68 when, batting at his usual position at number eleven, he played out the last over of the match bowled by Lance Gibbs, to ensure that England escaped from the match with a draw, to secure a 1–0 series win over the West Indies. This was to be his last Test, and his first-class career also finished in 1968, after an elbow injury ended his time prematurely at the age of 26.

Jones left cricket to find an occupation in brewing. His son, Simon Jones, a right-arm fast bowler for Glamorgan, also played Test cricket for England. Simon suffered a serious injury that ended his England career at the same age as his father.
