= Michael Morgan (Nottinghamshire cricketer) =

Welsh cricketer

Personal information
- Full name: Michael Morgan
- Born: 21 May 1936; Ynyshir, Glamorgan, Wales
- Died: 14 February 2023 (aged 86); Hinckley, Leicestershire, England
- Batting: Right-handed
- Bowling: Right-arm off-break
- Role: Bowler

Domestic team information
- Years: Team
- 1957–1961: Nottinghamshire

Career statistics
Competition	First-class
Matches	61
Runs scored	488
Batting average	6.97
100s/50s	–/1
Top score	56*
Balls bowled	10,085
Wickets	146
Bowling average	36.21
5 wickets in innings	3
10 wickets in match	–
Best bowling	6/50
Catches/stumpings	23/–
- Source: CricketArchive, 5 November 2024

Michael Morgan (21 May 1936 – 14 February 2023) was a Welsh first-class cricketer who played first-class cricket for Nottinghamshire from 1957 to 1961. Morgan was an off-spin bowler and tail-end batter. His best figures were 6 for 50 against Middlesex in August 1959. He was born at Ynyshir, Glamorgan and died at Hinckley, Leicestershire.
