= Brian Collins (cricketer) =

English cricketer (born 1941)

Personal information
- Full name: Brian George Collins
- Born: 11 August 1941 (age 85); Enfield, Middlesex, England
- Batting: Right-handed
- Bowling: Right-arm fast-medium

Domestic team information
- Years: Team
- 1979–1981: Minor Counties
- 1976–1978: Minor Counties West
- 1973–1979: Minor Counties South
- 1966–1987: Hertfordshire

Career statistics
Competition	First-class	List A
Matches	1	37
Runs scored	–	165
Batting average	–	9.16
100s/50s	–/–	–/–
Top score	–	20*
Balls bowled	222	2,078
Wickets	3	46
Bowling average	36.66	25.39
5 wickets in innings	–	1
10 wickets in match	–	–
Best bowling	3/83	5/20
Catches/stumpings	–/–	4/–
- Source: Cricinfo, 1 October 2011

Brian George Collins (born 11 August 1941) is a former English cricketer. Collins was a right-handed batsman who bowled right-arm fast-medium, with bowling being his main playing role. He was born at Enfield, Middlesex.

Collins made his debut for Hertfordshire in the 1966 Minor Counties Championship against Bedfordshire. He played Minor counties cricket for Hertfordshire from 1966 to 1987, making 102 Minor Counties Championship and three MCCA Knockout Trophy appearances. His List A debut came when Hertfordshire played Devon in the 1969 Gillette Cup. He made nine further List A appearances for the county, the last of which came against Surrey in the 1987 NatWest Trophy. In his ten List A appearances for Hertfordshire, he took 16 wickets at an average of 19.06, with best figures of 5/20.

He also played for a variety of combined Minor Counties teams. He made his debut for Minor Counties South in the 1973 Benson & Hedges Cup against Gloucestershire. He made ten further appearances for the team, the last of which came against Glamorgan in the 1979 Benson & Hedges Cup. In his eleven appearances for the team, he took 11 wickets at an average of 25.18, with best figures of 4/35. He also played List A cricket for Minor Counties West, first appearing for the team in the 1975 Benson & Hedges Cup against Gloucestershire, with Collins playing eight further matches for the team, the last of which came against Lancashire in the 1978 Benson & Hedges Cup. In his nine matches for the team, he took 8 wickets at an average of 43.00, with best figures of 3/29. Further appearances came for the Minor Counties cricket team, with Collins making a single first-class match against the touring Indians in 1979. In this match, he took the wickets of Anshuman Gaekwad, Chetan Chauhan and Dilip Vengsarkar as the Indians amassed a total of 315/4 declared, with Collins' figures reading 3/83 from 28 overs. He went wicket-less in the Indians second-innings, with the match ending in a draw. He made his first List A appearance for the Minor Counties in the 1980 Benson & Hedges Cup against Essex. He made seven further appearances in that format for the Minor Counties, the last of which came against Surrey in the 1981 Benson & Hedges Cup. In his eight List A appearances for the Minor Counties, he took 11 wickets at an average of 43.00, with best figures of 3/29.
