= Roy Wacey =

English cricketer

Personal information
- Full name: Roy Henry Wacey
- Born: 11 August 1937 (age 89); Bishop's Stortford, Hertfordshire, England
- Batting: Left-handed
- Bowling: Right-arm medium

Domestic team information
- Years: Team
- 1961–1978: Hertfordshire

Career statistics
Competition	List A
Matches	5
Runs scored	26
Batting average	6.50
100s/50s	0/0
Top score	12*
Balls bowled	240
Wickets	5
Bowling average	26.00
5 wickets in innings	0
10 wickets in match	0
Best bowling	2/21
Catches/stumpings	0/–
- Source: Cricinfo, 7 June 2011

Roy Henry Wacey (born 11 August 1937) is a former English cricketer. Wacey was a left-handed batsman who bowled right-arm medium pace. He was born in Bishop's Stortford, Hertfordshire.

Wacey made his debut for Hertfordshire in the 1961 Minor Counties Championship against Bedfordshire. Wacey played Minor counties cricket for Hertfordshire from 1961 to 1978, which included 63 Minor Counties Championship matches. He made his List A debut against Durham in the 1964 Gillette Cup. He made 4 further List A appearances for the county, the last coming against Berkshire in the 1976 Gillette Cup. In his 5 List A matches, he scored 26 runs at a batting average of 6.50, with a high score of 12 not out. With the ball, he took 5 wickets at a bowling average of 26.00, with best figures of 2/21.
