= Hamza Riazuddin =

English cricketer

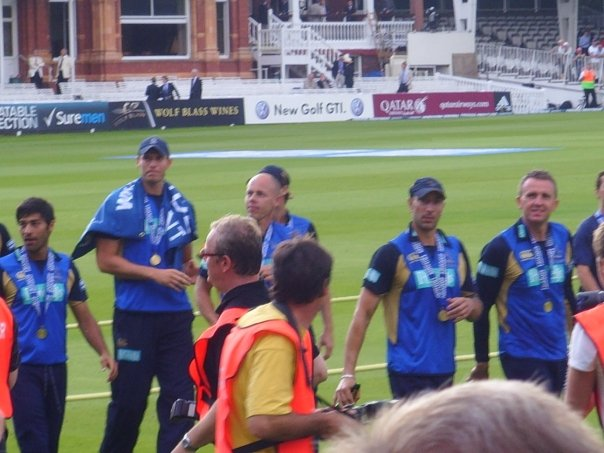
- Riazuddin, first on the left

Personal information
- Full name: Hamza Riazuddin
- Born: 19 December 1989 (age 36); Hendon, Middlesex, England
- Height: 5 ft 11 in (1.80 m)
- Batting: Right-handed
- Bowling: Right-arm medium

Domestic team information
- Years: Team
- 2008–2013: Hampshire (squad no. 38)
- 2015–2016: Buckinghamshire

Career statistics
Competition	FC	LA	T20
Matches	9	27	17
Runs scored	130	88	24
Batting average	18.57	11.00	8.00
100s/50s	–/1	–/–	–/–
Top score	55*	23*	13*
Balls bowled	1,074	1,038	348
Wickets	18	19	21
Bowling average	28.88	46.47	19.85
5 wickets in innings	1	–	–
10 wickets in match	–	–	–
Best bowling	5/61	3/37	4/15
Catches/stumpings	3/–	8/–	2/–
- Source: Cricinfo, 1 March 2024

Hamza Riazuddin (Urdu: حمزہ ریاض الدین; born 19 December 1989) is an English former cricketer.

== Cricket career ==
A British Pakistani, he was born at Hendon in December 1989, but grew up at Woodley, Berkshire. Riazuddin was educated at Crosfields School in Shinfield, before attending Bradfield College, where he was coached by the former cricketer Julian Wood. He turned down a place at university in order to pursue a career as a professional cricketer. Riazuddin captained the England under-19 cricket team in both Youth Test and One Day Internationals in 2008 and 2009.

A product of the Hampshire Academy, he made his debut in first-class cricket for Hampshire against Somerset at Taunton in the 2008 County Championship. In that same season, he made three appearances in List A one-day cricket and five in the Twenty20 Cup. He was rarely chosen to play first-class cricket, but did make four appearances in the 2012 County Championship, with Riazuddin taking his only five wicket haul (5 for 61) against Glamorgan, a match in which he hit Hampshire's winnings runs. Utilised predominantly in one-day and Twenty20 cricket, he made 27 one-day and seventeen Twenty20 appearances to 2013. In one-day cricket, he took 19 wickets with his right-arm medium pace bowling at an average of 46.47, with best figures of 3 for 37. In Twenty20 cricket, he took 21 wickets at an average of 19.85, with best figures of 4 for 15.

Once considered as a long-term replacement for Dimitri Mascarenhas, Riazuddin found his opportunities at Hampshire limited and subsequently left at the end of the 2013 season. He later played minor counties cricket for Buckinghamshire in 2015 and 2016, making two appearances in the Minor Counties Championship, seven in the MCCA Knockout Trophy, and one in the Minor Counties T20 competition. After leaving Hampshire, he played his club cricket for Falkland in the Thames Valley Cricket League.
