= Peter Marner =

English cricketer and rugby union footballer (1936–2007)

Cricket information
- Batting: Right-handed
- Bowling: Right-arm medium

Career statistics
| Competition | First-class | List A |
|---|---|---|
| Matches | 414 | 42 |
| Runs scored | 17,513 | 1,120 |
| Batting average | 28.33 | 28.00 |
| 100s/50s | 18/98 | 1/5 |
| Top score | 142* | 121 |
| Balls bowled | 23,830 | 1,850 |
| Wickets | 360 | 54 |
| Bowling average | 31.62 | 25.35 |
| 5 wickets in innings | 13 | 0 |
| 10 wickets in match | 1 | 0 |
| Best bowling | 7/29 | 4/24 |
| Catches/stumpings | 379/– | 26/– |
- Source: CricketArchive, 8 November 2022

Peter Thomas Marner (31 March 1936 – 16 May 2007) was an English cricketer who played first-class cricket for Lancashire and then Leicestershire. He was rated by Trevor Bailey as the most formidable English batsman without a Test cricket cap.

Marner was born in Oldham, Lancashire. An all-rounder, he played for Crompton in the Central Lancashire League aged 15, and made his first-class debut for Lancashire in 1952, aged 16 years and five months, against Sussex at Hove. This made him the youngest person to ever play for Lancashire, beating the record set in 1879 by Johnny Briggs. Powerfully built, he was a hard-hitting right-handed middle-order batsman, right-arm medium-pace seam bowler, and a good slip fielder.

Marner is also in the record books for being the first person to win a limited-overs Man of the Match award, when Lancashire played its first Gillette Cup match against Leicestershire at Old Trafford in May 1963. He scored the format's maiden century in that game with an innings of 121, and also took 3 wickets for 49 runs.

He clashed with the authorities at Lancashire, and moved to Leicestershire after the 1964 season. He toured Pakistan with a Commonwealth XI in 1967, but never played Test cricket. He reached 1,000 first-class runs in 12 seasons, scored 18 centuries, took 360 wickets, and held 379 catches.

Marner was also talented in rugby union playing for Oldham and the British Army during a two-year stint of National Service. He also represented the Combined Services in cricket during that period. He suffered a neck injury playing rugby which interrupted his career in both sports in the 1950s.

He died in Oldham after a short illness. He was survived by his wife Vera, daughter Sara and son Nick, who was a useful league fast bowler.
