= Malcolm Nash =

Welsh cricketer and coach (1945–2019)

Personal information
- Full name: Malcolm Andrew Nash
- Born: 9 May 1945; Abergavenny, Monmouthshire, Wales
- Died: 30 July 2019 (aged 74); London, England
- Batting: Left-handed
- Bowling: Left-arm medium Slow left-arm orthodox

Domestic team information
- Years: Team
- 1966–1983: Glamorgan
- 1984–1985: Shropshire

Career statistics
Competition	First-class	List A
Matches	336	271
Runs scored	7,129	2,303
Batting average	17.73	12.58
100s/50s	2/25	1/4
Top score	130	103*
Balls bowled	55,380	12,497
Wickets	993	324
Bowling average	25.87	21.27
5 wickets in innings	45	4
10 wickets in match	5	0
Best bowling	9/56	6/29
Catches/stumpings	148/–	48/–
- Source: CricInfo, 10 June 2012

Malcolm Andrew Nash (9 May 1945 – 30 July 2019) was a Welsh cricket player and coach. He played first-class cricket for Glamorgan. Nash was a left-arm medium-pace bowler and useful lower-order left-handed batsman. He made his debut for the county in 1966 and was released by the county after the 1983 season. He captained the county in 1980 and 1981. He took the most wickets for Glamorgan in 1969 when it won the county championship. In 1985, he played his last one-day match for Shropshire. Between 1966 and 1983 in his 17 years career, Nash took 993 first-class wickets, scored 7,129 runs and held 148 catches. He died on 30 July 2019 in London at the age of 74 years.

== Early life ==
Nash was born in Abergavenny, Monmouthshire, on 9 May 1945, to a cricketing father who was a member of the local club. He studied at Wells Cathedral School in Somerset, where he played cricket and hockey.

== First-class career ==
Despite the Sobers episode, Nash took just under 1000 first-class wickets (including Sobers's wicket on more than one occasion) at a good average of just over 25. His best bowling figures were 9 for 56 (the tenth wicket fell to a run out) in the first innings against Hampshire in 1975, when he took 14 wickets in the match. He took 7 for 15 to dismiss Somerset for 40 in 1968.

He also scored two hundreds with the bat, and hit four consecutive sixes himself in one over. His top score was 130, made against Surrey in the first game of the 1976 season. Coming in with the score 65 for 6 in reply to 338, Nash reached his century in 76 minutes. His other century came in 1978 against Leicestershire, when he came in at 78 for 7 and made 124, including five sixes, one of which brought up his century.

When Glamorgan won the County Championship in 1969, going through the season undefeated, Nash was the side's leading wicket-taker, with 71 at 18.98 in 21 matches; he also made 435 runs at 22.89.

=== Garfield Sobers's six sixes ===
Nash is best known for being the first bowler who was struck for six sixes in as many balls by Garfield Sobers on 31 August 1968 at Swansea while bowling slow left-arm. The ball was sold by Christie's the auctioneers for £26,400 in November 2006, although subsequent analysis has cast significant doubt on the authenticity of the ball sold – the ball sold was a Duke, while Nash stated that he had used only a Surridge ball during the over in question.

In August 1977, he was also hit for five sixes and a four by Lancashire batsman Frank Hayes.

Nash normally bowled medium-fast, but at the time, impressed by the success Derek Underwood was enjoying, he was experimenting with spin bowling. He later commented, "Sobers came along and quickly ended my slow-bowling career. It was a pretty short experiment."

== Limited-overs career ==
In a Benson & Hedges Cup match in 1976 Nash scored 103 not out against Hampshire, hitting 7 sixes and 7 fours, and reaching his century off 61 balls, after Glamorgan had been 85 for 6 when he came in. He then took 2 for 40 off 11 overs, Glamorgan won by 3 runs, and Nash won the match award. His best bowling was 6 for 29 against Worcestershire in the John Player League in 1975, when he took the last 5 wickets for 2 runs, including the hat-trick. Nevertheless, Worcestershire won by 48 runs.

Between 1966 and 1983 in his 17 years career, Nash took 993 first-class wickets, scored 7,129 runs and held 148 catches. Nash served as the captain of the county. In 1985, he played his last one-day match for Shropshire.

He played Minor Counties cricket for Shropshire in 1984 and 1985.

== Coaching career ==
After his playing career ended, Nash became a cricket coach in California. Nash then moved to Kansas before returning to Wales in 2013.

== Death ==
Nash died on 30 July 2019 in a hospital in London at the age of 74 years. He was being treated there after he became sick at a function at Lord's Cricket Ground.
