= Brian Booth (cricketer, born 1935) =

English cricketer (1935–2020)

Personal information
- Full name: Brian Joseph Booth
- Born: 3 December 1935; Billinge End, Blackburn, Lancashire, England
- Died: 14 December 2020 (aged 85)
- Batting: Right-handed
- Bowling: Right-arm leg-break and googly

Domestic team information
- Years: Team
- 1956–1963: Lancashire
- 1964–1973: Leicestershire

Career statistics
Competition	First-class	List A
Matches	350	64
Runs scored	15,298	870
Batting average	27.91	20.71
100s/50s	18/77	0/4
Top score	183*	73
Balls bowled	8,409	–
Wickets	146	–
Bowling average	32.03	–
5 wickets in innings	1	–
10 wickets in match	0	–
Best bowling	7/143	–
Catches/stumpings	135/–	11/–
- Source: Cricinfo, 25 May 2020

Brian Joseph Booth (3 December 1935 – 14 December 2020) was an English cricketer who played in 350 first-class matches and 64 List A games, nearly all of them for Lancashire and Leicestershire, in a career that stretched between 1956 and 1973. He was born in Billinge End, Blackburn, Lancashire.

Booth was a right-handed batsman sometimes used as an opener and a right-arm legbreak and googly bowler. He passed 1000 runs in eight seasons during his career, and scored more than 800 first-class runs in three other seasons. In his early career with Lancashire between 1956 and 1963, he bowled regularly, taking up to 30 wickets in a season, but after he joined Leicestershire in 1964 he was no more than an occasional bowler, and did not take more than nine wickets in any one season.

Booth's highest first-class score was 183 not out for Lancashire against Oxford University in 1961. His best bowling figures were 7 for 143 for Lancashire against Worcestershire in 1959.

Booth died aged 85 in December 2020.
