= Friends Provident Trophy =

One-day cricket competition in the United Kingdom

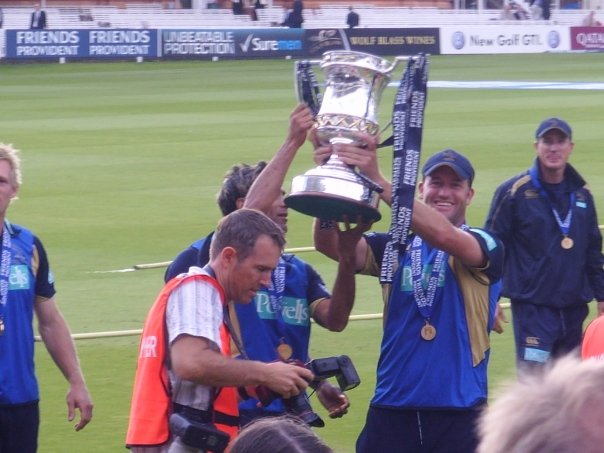
- Trophy in 2009, held aloft by Sean Ervine and Imran Tahir of Hampshire CCC
- Countries: England and Wales
- Administrator: England and Wales Cricket Board
- Format: List A cricket
- First edition: 1963
- Latest edition: 2009
- Number of teams: 20
- Current champion: Hampshire
- Most successful: Lancashire (7 titles)

The Friends Provident Trophy was a one-day cricket competition in the British Isles.

It was one of the four tournaments in which the eighteen first-class counties competed each season. They were joined by teams from Scotland and Ireland. Lancashire won the title a record seven times.

The competition was previously known as the Gillette Cup (1963–1980), the NatWest Trophy (1981–2000), and the C&G Trophy (2000–2006). For a short period following the 2006 season, the competition was known as the ECB One-Day Trophy because no sponsors were forthcoming when Cheltenham and Gloucester decided to end their association with the competition after the 2006 season. The tournament, along with the Pro40 forty-overs competition, was replaced by the ECB 40 competition from the 2010 season.

== History ==
It was the first top-level one-day competition to be introduced in English and Welsh cricket, amid concern about falling attendances at County Championship matches in the early 1960s.

The competition was based on the Midlands Counties Knockout Cup experiment of 1962, when Derbyshire, Leicestershire, Northamptonshire and Nottinghamshire played one-innings-a-side matches which each lasted one day. The MCC decided to hold a limited-overs competition (65 overs-a-side) the following year for all first-class counties, sponsored by American safety razor company Gillette. The original title was "The First Class Knock Out Competition for the Gillette Cup".

The first match (which was also retrospectively identified as the first List A cricket match after that designation was developed), was a Preliminary Round match on 1 May 1963 at Old Trafford, Manchester with Lancashire facing Leicestershire. The match ended up lasting two days due to rain. Peter Marner scored the first century and Brian Statham was the first bowler to take 5 wickets in a match.

Sussex were the first winners of the Gillette Cup, beating Worcestershire in the final at Lord's. Norman Gifford was the first "Man of the Match" for a final.

== Knock-out competition ==
In the inaugural season, the matches were 65 overs per side, with a bowler bowling a maximum of 15 overs. In 1964, this was reduced to 60 overs with a bowler bowling a maximum of 13. For the 1966 competition until 1998, the maximum was 12.

Minor Counties teams first competed in the 1964 season. The competition has been seen as a cricketing version of football's FA Cup (it being said that "the B&H was always the League Cup final to the Gillette/NatWest's FA Cup"), with Minor Counties, Ireland and Scotland playing against the First Class Counties in the first round. Most of the time, the established teams beat the part-timers, but very occasionally, favored teams would lose. Between 1963 and 2005, there were 15 upsets, including: Durham (at that time still a minor county), the first in 1973, versus Yorkshire; Hertfordshire, on two occasions, beating Essex in 1976 and winning a bowl-out versus Derbyshire in 1991; and Herefordshire overcoming a Middlesex side featuring Andrew Strauss in 2001. However, the majority of the time, the first round was an opportunity for county sides to put up very high scores against or easily bowl out Minor Counties opposition.

One of the most famous matches in the competition was the 1971 Gillette Cup semi-final at Old Trafford, with David Hughes of Lancashire coming out to bat at 8:45 pm (before any floodlights) and scoring 24 in one over to beat Gloucestershire. That Lancashire team won the tournament three seasons in a row from 1970 to 1972.

In June 1973, Durham became the first minor county to defeat a first-class county in the competition, when they beat Yorkshire by six wickets in round one. They then became the first minor county to defeat two first class counties, when they defeated Derbyshire at the same stage in 1985. This was the catalyst for the successful campaign that saw Durham gain first-class status in 1991.

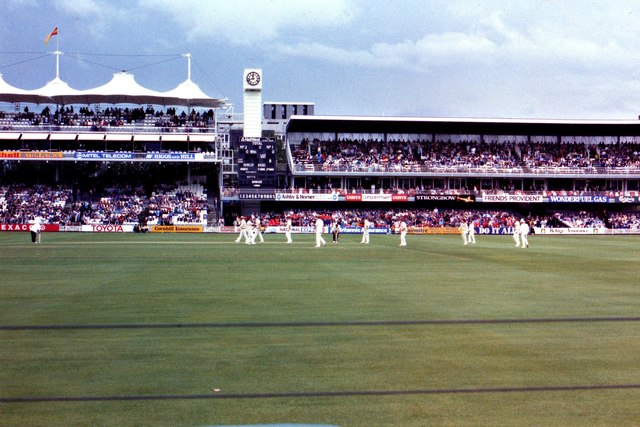
The 1987 NatWest Trophy final between Northants and Nottinghamshire at Lord's

In 1981, the National Westminster Bank took over the sponsorship of the competition from Gillette. That year's final finished in a tie, with both sides scoring 235. Derbyshire claimed the trophy from Northamptonshire by losing fewer wickets (Derbyshire 6 to Northants 9).

Other last-ball finishes in the final occurred in 1984 when Middlesex beat Kent, in 1985 when Essex beat Nottinghamshire, and in 1993 when Warwickshire beat Sussex. There was a notable finish too in 1987 when Nottinghamshire's unlikely victory over Northamptonshire was engineered by Richard Hadlee in his last season with the county.

The tournament was always the more prestigious of the two "full length" one-day cup competitions. The other was the Benson & Hedges Cup, which was abolished in 2002 and replaced with the Twenty20 Cup. At a time when county cricketers' exposure on television was limited, the final of the Gillette Cup/NatWest Bank Trophy was a relatively high-profile opportunity for some to make a case for national selection, especially as it often fell in early September, just before the announcement of an England winter tour party. Thus strong performances by Roland Butcher in the 1980 final, and Geoff Cook in 1981, may have assisted their subsequent selection and Test debuts. The strong performances of then young cricketers Angus Fraser and Mark Ramprakash for Middlesex in 1988 certainly raised their profiles. Conversely, surprise was expressed in 1990 when Phillip DeFreitas was initially overlooked for selection for the winter Ashes series, it being suggested at the time that he "surely booked his place on England's winter tour of Australia with an astonishing eight-over opening burst, which reduced Northants to an unbelievable 39 for five" in the final.

Other notable individual performances included a brisk out-of-character century by Geoff Boycott in the 1965 final, and the domination of the 1979 final by the West Indies pair Viv Richards and Joel Garner, who helped Somerset to their first major trophy a few months after helping West Indies to win the World Cup, also at Lord's. Another West Indies international, Alvin Kallicharran, completed the first double century in the tournament in 1984, in a tie in which he remarkably also took six wickets.

The necessity of aiming to complete a scheduled 120 overs in a day (130 when the tournament began) necessitated some early starts. End of season early-morning conditions by the time of the final often favoured the team fielding first, who usually triumphed in the 1980s and 1990s. A rare exception occurred in 1996, when Lancashire bowlers Glen Chapple and Peter Martin triggered a remarkable collapse by Essex.

In 1999, the number of overs was cut to 50 per side to give English and Welsh cricketers more experience of playing matches the same length as One Day Internationals. In line with One Day International cricket, teams played in coloured clothing from 2005.

== League from 2006 ==
The competition was revised into a league format from 2006. The eighteen English and Welsh first-class sides, plus Scotland and Ireland, were split into two groups of ten by geographical location known as the North and South Conferences. Matches were 50 overs per side, gaining two points for a win, one point for a no result and no points for a loss. Once the league positions were decided, the top teams from each Conference competed for the trophy in a final at Lord's. In the 2007 season this involved a semi-final knock-out stage, the winner in each conference playing the runners-up in the other.

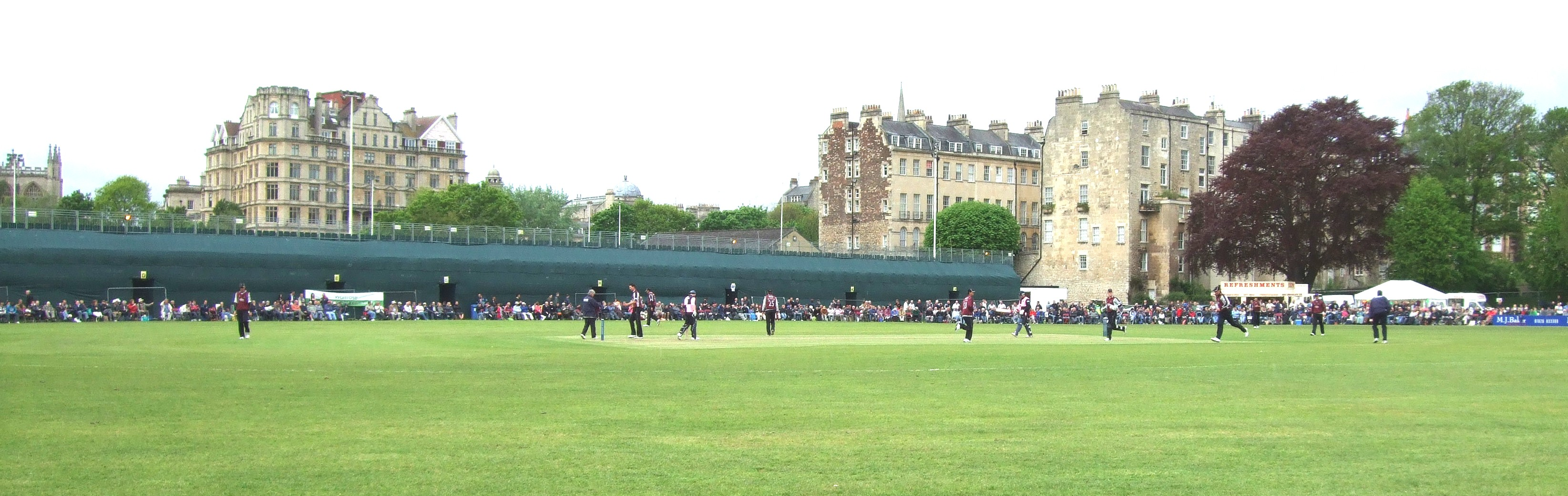
Friends Provident Trophy match in 2009 at the Recreation Ground, Bath: Somerset v Middlesex

The league structure was revised in 2008 as the twenty teams were split into four groups of five. Each team plays the other in the group home once and away once, with the top 2 counties in the group going into the quarter-finals.

The competition was played in the first half of the cricket season with the final taking place in August. The other main domestic one-day competition, the Natwest Pro40 League (formerly "Sunday League"), was latterly played during the second half of the season.

In August 2009, the ECB announced that from 2010 there would be one 40-overs per innings tournament replacing both the Pro40 and the Friends Provident Trophy. This along with the English County Championship and the Friends Provident t20 (a revised form of the Twenty20 Cup), would be English cricket's three domestic competitions.

== Final results ==
Gillette Cup

Year	Final		
Year	Winner	Result	Runner-up
1963; Details; 65 overs max	Sussex; 168 (60.2 overs)	Sussex won by 14 runs	Worcestershire; 154 (63.2 overs)
1964; Details; 60 overs max	Sussex; 131 for 2 (41.2 overs)	Sussex won by 8 wickets	Warwickshire; 127 (48 overs)
1965; Details; 60 overs max	Yorkshire; 317 for 4 (60 overs)	Yorkshire won by 175 runs	Surrey; 142 (40.4 overs)
1966; Details; 60 overs max	Warwickshire; 159 for 5 (56.4 overs)	Warwickshire won by 5 wickets	Worcestershire; 155 for 8 (60 overs)
1967; Details; 60 overs max	Kent; 193 (59.4 overs)	Kent won by 32 runs	Somerset; 161 (54.5 overs)
1968; Details; 60 overs max	Warwickshire; 215 for 6 (57 overs)	Warwickshire won by 4 wickets	Sussex; 214 for 7 (60 overs)
1969; Details; 60 overs max	Yorkshire; 219 for 8 (60 overs)	Yorkshire won by 69 runs	Derbyshire; 150 (54.4 overs)
1970; Details; 60 overs max	Lancashire; 185 for 4 (55.1 overs)	Lancashire won by 6 wickets	Sussex; 184 for 9 (60 overs)
1971; Details; 60 overs max	Lancashire; 224 for 7 (60 overs)	Lancashire won by 24 runs	Kent; 200 (56.2 overs)
1972; Details; 60 overs max	Lancashire; 235 for 6 (56.4 overs)	Lancashire won by 4 wickets	Warwickshire; 234 for 9 (60 overs)
1973; Details; 60 overs max	Gloucestershire; 248 for 8 (60 overs)	Gloucestershire won by 40 runs	Sussex; 208 (56.5 overs)
1974; Details; 60 overs max	Kent; 122 for 6 (46.5 overs)	Kent won by 4 wickets	Lancashire; 118 (60 overs)
1975; Details; 60 overs max	Lancashire; 182 for 3 (57 overs)	Lancashire won by 7 wickets	Middlesex; 180 for 8 (60 overs)
1976; Details; 60 overs max	Northamptonshire; 199 for 6 (58.1 overs)	Northamptonshire won by 4 wickets	Lancashire; 195 for 7 (60 overs)
1977; Details; 60 overs max	Middlesex; 178 for 5 (55.4 overs)	Middlesex won by 5 wickets	Glamorgan; 177 for 9 (60 overs)
1978; Details; 60 overs max	Sussex; 211 for 5 (53.1 overs)	Sussex won by 5 wickets	Somerset; 207 for 7 (60 overs)
1979; Details; 60 overs max	Somerset; 269 for 8 (60 overs)	Somerset won by 45 runs	Northamptonshire; 224 (56.3 overs)
1980; Details; 60 overs max	Middlesex; 202 for 3 (53.5 overs)	Middlesex won by 7 wickets	Surrey; 201 (60 overs)

NatWest Trophy

Year	Final		
Year	Winner	Result	Runner-up
1981; Details; 60 overs max	Derbyshire; 235 for 6 (60 overs)	Match tied Derbyshire won having lost fewer wickets	Northamptonshire; 235 for 9 (60 overs)
1982; Details; 60 overs max	Surrey; 159 for 1 (33.4 overs)	Surrey won by 9 wickets	Warwickshire; 158 (57.2 overs)
1983; Details; 60 overs max	Somerset; 193 for 9 (60 overs)	Somerset won by 24 runs	Kent; 169 (47.1 overs)
1984; Details; 60 overs max	Middlesex; 236 for 6 (60 overs)	Middlesex won by 4 wickets	Kent; 232 for 6 (60 overs)
1985; Details; 60 overs max	Essex; 280 for 2 (60 overs)	Essex won by 1 run	Nottinghamshire; 279 for 5 (60 overs)
1986; Details; 60 overs max	Sussex; 243 for 3 (58.2 overs)	Sussex won by 7 wickets	Lancashire; 242 for 8 (60 overs)
1987; Details; 60 overs max	Nottinghamshire; 231 for 7 (49.3 overs)	Nottinghamshire won by 3 wickets Reserve day used; match reduced to 50 overs per innings	Northamptonshire; 228 for 3 (50 overs)
1988; Details; 60 overs max	Middlesex; 162 for 7 (55.3 overs)	Middlesex won by 3 wickets	Worcestershire; 161 for 9 (60 overs)
1989; Details; 60 overs max	Warwickshire; 211 for 6 (59.4 overs)	Warwickshire won by 4 wickets	Middlesex; 210 for 5 (60 overs)
1990; Details; 60 overs max	Lancashire; 173 for 3 (45.4 overs)	Lancashire won by 7 wickets	Northamptonshire; 171 (60 overs)
1991; Details; 60 overs max	Hampshire; 243 for 6 (59.4 overs)	Hampshire won by 4 wickets	Surrey; 240 for 5 (60 overs)
1992; Details; 60 overs max	Northamptonshire; 211 for 2 (49.4 overs)	Northamptonshire won by 8 wickets	Leicestershire; 208 for 7 (60 overs)
1993; Details; 60 overs max	Warwickshire; 322 for 5 (60 overs)	Warwickshire won by 5 wickets	Sussex; 321 for 6 (60 overs)
1994; Details; 60 overs max	Worcestershire; 227 for 2 (49.1 overs)	Worcestershire won by 8 wickets	Warwickshire; 223 for 9 (60 overs)
1995; Details; 60 overs max	Warwickshire; 203 for 6 (58.5 overs)	Warwickshire won by 4 wickets	Northamptonshire; 200 (59.5 overs)
1996; Details; 60 overs max	Lancashire; 186 (60 overs)	Lancashire won by 129 runs	Essex; 57 (27.2 overs)
1997; Details; 60 overs max	Essex; 171 for 1 (26.3 overs)	Essex won by 9 wickets	Warwickshire; 170 (60 overs)
1998; Details; 60 overs max	Lancashire; 109 for 1 (30.2 overs)	Lancashire won by 9 wickets	Derbyshire; 108 (36.4 overs)
1999; Details; 50 overs max	Gloucestershire; 230 for 8 (50 overs)	Gloucestershire won by 50 runs	Somerset; 180 (45.1 overs)
2000; Details; 50 overs max	Gloucestershire; 122 for 3 (29.4 overs)	Gloucestershire won by 22 runs (D/L method); Rain stopped play after 29.4 overs; Gloucestershire target revised to 101.	Warwickshire; 205 for 7 (50 overs)

C&G Trophy

Year	Final		
Year	Winner	Result	Runner-up
2001; Details; 50 overs max	Somerset; 271 for 5 (50 overs)	Somerset won by 41 runs	Leicestershire; 230 (45.4 overs)
2002; Details; 50 overs max	Yorkshire; 260 for 4 (48 overs)	Yorkshire won by 6 wickets	Somerset; 256 for 8 (50 overs)
2003; Details; 50 overs max	Gloucestershire; 150 for 3 (20.3 overs)	Gloucestershire won by 7 wickets	Worcestershire; 149 (46.3 overs)
2004; Details; 50 overs max	Gloucestershire; 237 for 2 (43.5 overs)	Gloucestershire won by 8 wickets	Worcestershire; 236 for 9 (50 overs)
2005; Details; 50 overs max	Hampshire; 290 (50 overs)	Hampshire won by 18 runs	Warwickshire; 272 (49.2 overs)
2006; Details; 50 overs max	Sussex; 172 (47.1 overs)	Sussex won by 15 runs	Lancashire; 157 (47.2 overs)

Friends Provident Trophy

Year	Final		
Year	Winner	Result	Runner-up
2007; Details; 50 overs max	Durham; 312/5 (50 overs)	Durham won by 125 runs Rain stopped play after 32.2 overs; Reserve day used	Hampshire; 187 (41 overs)
2008; Details; 50 overs max	Essex; 218/5 (48.5 overs)	Essex won by 5 wickets	Kent; 214 (50 overs)
2009; Details; 50 overs max	Hampshire; 221/4 (40.3 overs)	Hampshire won by 6 wickets	Sussex; 219/9 (50 overs)

== Wins by county 1963–2009 ==
- 7 wins: Lancashire
- 5 wins: Gloucestershire; Sussex; Warwickshire
- 4 wins: Middlesex
- 3 wins: Somerset; Yorkshire; Essex; Hampshire
- 2 wins: Kent; Northamptonshire
- 1 win: Derbyshire; Durham; Nottinghamshire; Surrey; Worcestershire

First class counties with no wins: Glamorgan and Leicestershire

== See also ==
- County Championship – the first class cricket competition in England and Wales.
- Pro40 – the one day league competition.
- Twenty20 Cup – the Twenty20 format competition.
