= Hugo Yarnold =

English cricketer

Personal information
- Full name: Henry Yarnold
- Born: 6 July 1917; Worcester, England
- Died: 13 August 1974 (aged 57); Leamington Spa, Warwickshire, England
- Batting: Right-handed
- Role: Wicket-keeper

Domestic team information
- Years: Team
- 1938–1955: Worcestershire
- FC debut: 24 August 1938 Worcestershire v Nottinghamshire
- Last FC: 2 September 1955 Worcestershire v Hampshire

Career statistics
Competition	First-class
Matches	287
Runs scored	3,741
Batting average	10.75
100s/50s	0/7
Top score	68
Catches/stumpings	466/231
- Source: CricketArchive, 2 December 2008

Henry Yarnold (6 July 1917 – 13 August 1974), known as Hugo Yarnold, was an English first-class cricketer who became a Test match umpire. He was born at Worcester in 1917.

Yarnold was a diminutive lower-order right-handed batsman and a wicketkeeper who played for Worcestershire. He made his first-class debut in an end-of-season match in the 1938 season as the deputy for Syd Buller, who would later be an umpiring colleague. He was then Buller's replacement for two months of the 1939 season after Buller was seriously injured in the car crash that took the life of opening batsman Charlie Bull during the Whitsun match with Essex.

Returning to Worcestershire after the Second World War, Yarnold again understudied Buller, who played in 25 of the county's 27 first-class matches. But Yarnold himself played in 17 games, mainly as a batsman. Early in the season, in the match against Sussex at Hove, he made 64 in the first innings, his first score of more than 50. There were, however, to be only six other scores of more than 50 in his entire career and his season's batting average for 1946, at 15.45 runs per innings, was higher than he achieved in any other season. The 64 was surpassed only once: in 1947, playing for North against South in the traditional end-of-season fixture, he made 68.

Buller retired from first-class cricket at the end of the 1946 season, and the following year Yarnold stepped into his position as the regular Worcestershire wicketkeeper. He remained there for the next nine seasons until he himself retired at the end of the 1955 season. In his first season as regular wicketkeeper, he broke the Worcestershire record for the most dismissals in a season, with 85 (plus three more in the North v South match). Two years later, in 1949, he broke his own record and his 110 dismissals that season – 63 catches and 47 stumpings – put him third on the all-time list for the number of dismissals by a wicketkeeper in one season, exceeded only by Leslie Ames, who made 128 in 1929 and 122 in 1928. In the match against Hampshire at Worcester, he made nine dismissals in the match, and was awarded a bonus of £100 by the county club. Many of the stumpings, and some catches, were made off the bowling of the unorthodox leg-spinner Roly Jenkins, who took 183 wickets in the season and was named as a Wisden Cricketer of the Year.

The 1949 tally of dismissals remains a county record: in 1951 Yarnold achieved what may be a first-class cricket record. Playing against Scotland in a first-class match at Dundee, he equalled the then record for most dismissals in a first-class innings with seven and set what was claimed as a new world record with six stumpings among them.

After retiring from first-class cricket in 1955, he became an umpire from 1959 until his death in 1974. He umpired in three Test matches, one each against India and Pakistan in 1967 and one against Australia the following year.

He died on the way home from umpiring in a rain-ruined three-day game between Northamptonshire and Essex at Wellingborough when his car crashed into a lorry at Leamington Spa.
