= List of Norfolk County Cricket Club List A players =

This is a list of cricketers who have played for Norfolk County Cricket Club in List A matches. Norfolk, one of the Minor Counties, played 26 List A cricket matches – a one-day, limited overs form of cricket – between 1965 and 2003. After making their List A debut in the 1965 Gillette Cup the county played four matches in the competition up to the 1970. Minor counties were not a regular feature of the competition until the 1982 NatWest Trophy after which Norfolk took part every year until the 1985 competition and then from 1990 until 2004, the last year in which all Minor Counties were included.

The knock-out nature of the Gillette Cup means that in most competitions Norfolk only played one match, generally against a first-class county. The exceptions were in 2000 and 2002 when Norfolk won their opening round match on each occasion and, in 2002, advanced to the third round of the competition after winning two matches. From the 2002 competition onwards the opening rounds of the tournament were held during the previous English cricket season. As a result, Norfolk's last List A match, in the 2004 Cheltenham & Gloucester Trophy, actually took place in August 2003.

Players are listed alphabetically with the number of matches played and the calendar years in which they made their first and last appearances in List A cricket for Norfolk. Most players also made appearances for Norfolk in the Minor Counties Championship. Some will have represented other teams in top-class cricket. Only their appearances for Norfolk are included below.

== A ==
- Nick Adams, 1 match, 1997
- Andrew Agar, 2 matches, 1983–1984
- Terry Allcock, 2 matches, 1965–1968
- Carl Amos, 13 matches, 1994–2003
- Rob Austin, 1 match, 2001

== B ==
- Gary Bailey, 1 match, 1998
- Terry Barnes, 1 match, 1982
- John Barrett, 1 match, 1982
- Ian Battelley, 1 match, 1970
- Richard Belmont, 1 match, 1991
- Gordon Bland, 1 match, 1968
- Henry Blofeld, 1 match, 1965
- Tim Boon, 2 matches, 1996–1997
- Christopher Borrett, 5 matches, 2001–2003
- Paul Borrett, 1 match, 1970
- Matthew Boyden, 3 matches, 1997–1999
- Robert Bradford, 1 match, 1984
- Paul Bradshaw, 11 match, 1997–2003
- Chris Brown, 6 matches, 2001–2003
- Rodney Bunting, 5 matches, 1985–1995

== C ==
- Christopher Carey, 2 matches, 2001
- John Carter, 1 match, 1985
- Andrew Clarke, 2 matches, 2000
- Adam Cole, 2 matches, 1993–1994
- Nigel Cook, 3 matches, 1982–1985
- Wendell Coppin, 1 match, 1999
- Stephen Crowley, 4 matches, 1993–1996

== D ==
- Pierre de Bruyn, 1 match, 2003
- Stephen Dixon, 3 matches, 1990–1993
- James Donaldson, 2 matches, 1968–1969

== E ==
- Bill Edrich, 4 matches, 1965–1970
- Mark Ellis, 2 matches, 1990–1991

== F ==
- Richard Farrow, 2 matches, 1992–1993
- Roger Finney, 5 matches, 1990–1994
- Neil Foster, 1 match, 1995
- Neil Fox, 8 matches, 1993–2000
- Peter Free, 4 matches, 2000–2001

== G ==
- James Garner, 6 matches, 2000–2002
- Steven Goldsmith, 15 matches, 1993–2003
- John Greatrex, 1 match, 1970

== H ==
- Alan Halford, 2 matches, 1969–1970
- Fred Handley, 6 matches, 1970–1990
- Stephen Harvey, 1 match, 1995
- Paul Harwood, 1 match, 1998
- Edward Hodson, 1 match, 1984
- Robin Huggins, 4 matches, 1982–1985

== I ==
- Richard Innes, 1 match, 1983

== J ==
- Richard Jefferson, 3 matches, 1968–1970

== K ==
- Raymond Kingshott, 3 matches, 1990–1992

== L ==
- Jimmy Lewis, 2 matches, 1990–1992
- Stephen Livermore, 7 matches, 1992–2002
- Nigel Llong, 2 matches, 2000

== M ==
- Colin McManus, 2 matches, 1968–1969
- Josh Marquet, 1 match, 2003
- Doug Mattocks, 7 matches, 1969–1991
- John Maynard, 1 match, 1994
- Ian Mercer, 4 matches, 1965–1970
- Tracey Moore, 4 matches, 1965–1970
- David Morrell, 1 match, 1992

== N ==
- Paul Newman, 12 matches, 1996–2003

== P ==
- Michael Parlane, 2 matches, 2002
- Parvez Mir, 4 matches, 1982–1985
- David Pilch, 4 matches, 1965–1983
- Steve Plumb, 10 matches, 1982–1995
- Mark Powell, 2 matches, 1995–1996

== R ==
- Philip Ringwood, 1 match, 1983
- Carl Rogers, 17 matches, 1991–2003
- Billy Rose, 2 matches, 1965–1970
- Claude Rutter, 1 match, 1965

== S ==
- Martin Saggers, 1 match, 1996
- Darren Savage, 1 match, 1991
- Graham Saville, 2 matches, 1968–1969
- Peter Sharpe, 1 match, 1965
- Phil Sharpe, 1 match, 1982
- John Shepperd, 2 matches, 1965–1968
- Danny Stamp, 2 matches, 1990–1991
- David Stockings, 1 match, 1968

== T ==
- Nick Taylor, 1 match, 1990
- Paul Taylor, 2 matches, 2002
- Steven Taylor, 1 match, 1992
- David Thomas, 12 matches, 1984–1999
- Mark Thomas, 4 matches, 1996–1999
- Peter Thomas, 1 match, 1983
- Mark Tipping, 1 match, 1998
- Don Topley, 2 matches, 1984–1985

== W ==
- James Walker, 6 matches, 1999–2003
- Michael Ward, 1 match, 1996
- Mark Whitaker, 1 match, 1969
- Paul Whittaker, 2 matches, 1984–1985
- Matthew Wilkinson, 1 match, 2003
- Edward Wright, 1 match, 1982
- Martin Wright, 1 match, 1965
