= Borrett =

Borrett is a surname. Notable people with the surname include:

- Charles Borrett (1916–2000), British Anglican Archdeacon
- Christopher Borrett (born 1979), British cricketer
- George Borrett (1868–1952), Royal Navy officer
- Norman Borrett (1917–2004), British sportsman
- Oswald Borrett (1878–1950), British Army officer
- Paul Borrett (born 1944), British cricketer
- Sheila Borrett (1905–1986), British pioneer broadcaster

== See also ==
- Boritt, another surname
