= 1933 in radio =

The year 1933 saw a number of significant events in radio broadcasting.

== Events ==
- 14 January – In Spain, radio station EAJ-24 Radio Córdoba begins transmission, its first broadcast coming from the Conservatorio Superior de Música in the city.
- 24 February – In New Zealand, station 2YC Wellington is opened.
- 12 March – President of the United States Franklin D. Roosevelt begins a series of radio "Fireside chats" with "On the Bank Crisis".
- 7 May – Fireside chat: "Outlining the New Deal Program".
- 31 May – As the first step towards removing advertising from public radio, the French government introduces a broadcast receiving licence fee payable by owners of radio sets (15 francs per crystal set, 50 francs per valve radio).
- 1 July – In Norway, NRK becomes the national broadcaster.
- 24 July – Fireside chat: "On the Purposes and Foundations of the Recovery Program". Roosevelt introduces the concept of the "first 100 days".
- 28 July – Sheila Borrett becomes the first female BBC Radio broadcaster.
- 18 August – In Germany, the Volksempfänger ("people's receiver"), a readily affordable radio set designed to be capable, as far as possible, of picking up only the transmissions of government-controlled stations, is presented at the 10th International Radio Show, Berlin.
- 22 October – Fireside chat: "On the Currency Situation"'.

== Debuts ==
- 31 January – The Lone Ranger (1933–1955) (WXYZ Detroit)
- 7 March – Marie the Little French Princess (CBS; first daytime radio serial)
- 17 March – The Armour Jester (NBC Blue Network)
- 11 June – Carefree Carnival (NBC Red)
- 23 June – Don McNeill's Breakfast Club (NBC Blue Network)
- 31 July – Jack Armstrong, the All-American Boy (CBS)
- 14 August – Ma Perkins (WLW Cincinnati). On 4 December, the program moves to the full NBC Red Network.
- 24 September – Broadway Varieties (CBS)
- 25 September – The Tom Mix Ralston Straight Shooters (NBC)
- 2 October – The National Barn Dance (NBC Blue Network)
- 8 October – The Baker's Broadcast (NBC Blue Network).
- 22 October – The American Revue (CBS).
- 30 October – The Romance of Helen Trent (CBS)
- 11 November – The Admiral Byrd Broadcasts (CBS)
- 18 November – In Town Tonight (BBC National Programme)
- 29 November – Calling All Cars (CBS West Coast network)
- UNDATED
  - Argonauts Club (ABC Radio Melbourne)
  - The Oldsmobile Program (CBS)
  - Scrapbook (BBC)

== Endings ==
- May – WPAW is merged into WPRO.

== Births ==
- 11 March – Merv Smith, New Zealand radio broadcaster (died 2018)
- 13 March – Gloria McMillan, American actress, plays Harriet Conklin in Our Miss Brooks.
- 17 June – Harry Browne (died 2006), American libertarian writer, politician, U.S. Presidential candidate in 1996 and 2000, and radio talk show host.
- 3 December – Les Crane (died 2008), San Francisco-based radio announcer and television talk show host who wins a Grammy for his recording of the poem Desiderata.
- 19 November – Larry King (died 2021), American radio and television host (WIOD).
