= Matthew Wilkinson =

Matthew Wilkinson may refer to:

- Mathew Wilkinson, Australian film and television actor
- Matt Wilkinson (actor), British actor, playwright and director
- Matt Wilkinson (baseball), Canadian baseball pitcher
- Matt Wilkinson (radio presenter), British radio presenter on Heart Radio and TV continuity announcer
- Matt Wilkinson (surfer), Australian surfer
- Matthew Wilkinson (cricketer), English cricketer
- Matthew Wilkinson (figure skater), British and South African figure skater
- Matthew Wilkinson (runner), American steeplechaser
