= David Morrell =

David Morrell may refer to:

- David Morrell (actor) (1926–1974), British actor
- David Morrell (doctor) (1929–2012), British academic general practitioner
- David Morrell (writer) (born 1943), Canadian-American novelist
- David Morrell (cricketer) (born 1971), British cricketer
- David Morrell (boxer) (born 1998), Cuban boxer
