= Paul Whittaker =

Paul Whittaker may refer to:

- Paul Whittaker (cricketer) (born 1965), English cricketer.
- Paul Whittaker (newspaper editor), Australian newspaper journalist and editor
- Paul Whittaker, Australian naval officer serving as Warrant Officer of the Navy from 1993 to 1997

== See also ==
- Paul Whitaker (born 1973), English cricketer
