= Robert Bradford =

Robert Bradford may refer to:

- Robert F. Bradford (1902–1983), Governor of Massachusetts, 1947–1949
- Robert William Bradford (1923–2023), Canadian aviation artist
- Bobby Bradford (born 1934), American jazz trumpeter
- Robert Bradford (Northern Irish politician) (1941–1981), Ulster Unionist Member of Parliament, assassinated in 1981
- Robert Bradford (cricketer) (born 1952), English cricketer
