= Arsenal of Democracy =

Slogan of Roosevelt in World War II

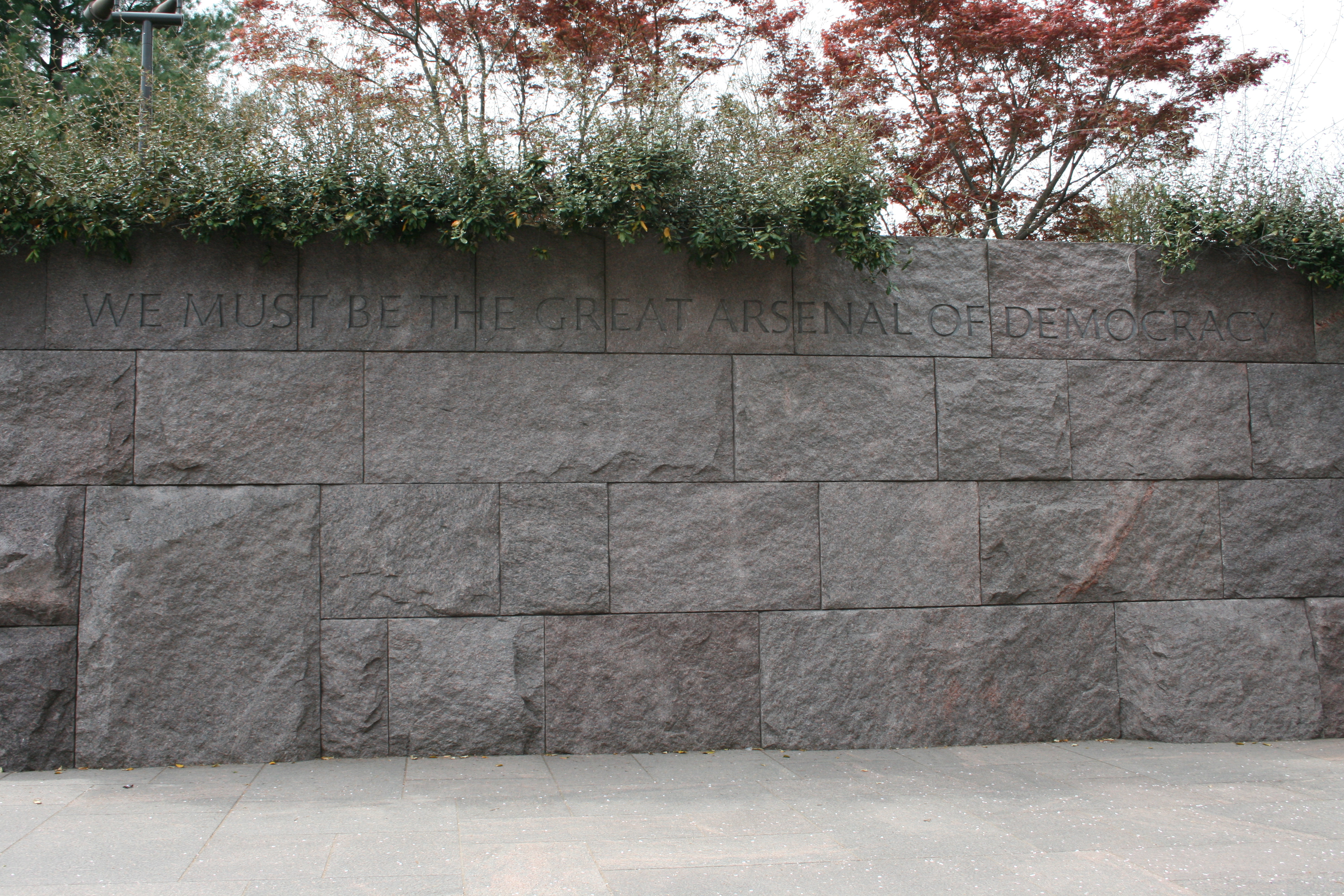
- The "Arsenal of Democracy" quotation from Franklin D. Roosevelt's fireside chat of December 29, 1940, is carved into the stone of the Franklin Delano Roosevelt Memorial
- Date: December 29, 1940; 85 years ago
- Venue: White House
- Also known as: Fireside Chat #16
- Type: Speech
- Fireside Chat on National Security. Franklin Delano Roosevelt's December 29, 1940 speech on the "Arsenal of Democracy".

"Arsenal of Democracy" was the central phrase used by U.S. President Franklin D. Roosevelt in a radio broadcast on the threat to national security, delivered on December 29, 1940—nearly a year before the United States entered the Second World War (1939–1945). Roosevelt promised to help the United Kingdom fight Nazi Germany by selling them military supplies while the United States stayed out of the actual fighting. The president announced that intent a year before the attack on Pearl Harbor (7 December 1941), at a time when Germany had occupied much of Europe and threatened Britain.

Nazi Germany was allied with Fascist Italy and the Empire of Japan (the Axis powers). At the time, Germany and the Soviet Union had signed a non-aggression treaty under the Molotov–Ribbentrop Pact, and had jointly effected the Invasion of Poland (1939), a Realpolitik deal that remained effective until Operation Barbarossa, the Nazi invasion of the Soviet Union, in 1941.

Roosevelt's address was a call to arms for supporting the Allies in Europe, and, to a lesser extent, the Republic of China, in total war against Nazi Germany and Imperial Japan. "The great arsenal of democracy" came to specifically refer to the industry of the U.S., as the primary supplier of material for the Allied war effort.

"Arsenal of democracy" refers to the collective efforts of American industry in supporting the Allies, which efforts tended to be concentrated in the established industrial centers of the U.S., such as Detroit, Cleveland, Philadelphia, Buffalo, Rochester, Chicago, New York, and Pittsburgh, among other cities.

== Origins of the phrase ==
In 1918, Doubleday executive Herbert S. Houston analyzed World War I with an article titled "Blocking New Wars". He wrote that American business was the "Protector of Democracy" while the American free press was "one of the most effective weapons in the arsenal of democracy."

Writing in German, Joseph Goebbels used the expression "arsenal of democracy" on April 30, 1928, in his newspaper Der Angriff (The Attack) to refer to using democratic institutions against themselves: "We enter the Reichstag to use the arsenal of democracy in order to assault it with its own weapons."

The concept of America as an actual arsenal came from the American playwright Robert E. Sherwood, who was quoted in the May 12, 1940 New York Times as saying "this country is already, in effect, an arsenal for the democratic Allies." Although the French economist Jean Monnet had used the phrase later in 1940, he was urged by Felix Frankfurter not to use it again so Roosevelt could make use of it in his speeches. The phrase was suggested by top Roosevelt advisor Harry Hopkins. Yet another account has it that Roosevelt borrowed the phrase from Detroit auto executive William S. Knudsen, whom Roosevelt tapped to lead the United States' war material production efforts.

== Synopsis ==
Much of the ending of the speech attempted to dispel complacency. Roosevelt laid out the situation, and then pointed out the flaws in United States isolationism. He mentioned that "Some of us like to believe that even if Britain falls, we are still safe, because of the broad expanse of the Atlantic and of the Pacific."

"Some of us like to believe that even if Britain falls, we are still safe, because of the broad expanse of the Atlantic and of the Pacific..."

He refuted this by saying that modern technology had effectively reduced the distances across those oceans, allowing even for "planes that could fly from the British Isles to New England and back again without refueling."

After establishing the danger, the president then proceeded to request action from the people. He acknowledged a telegram he had received. He refuted its message, which he summarized as "Please, Mr. President, don't frighten us by telling us the facts." The central fact he felt Americans must grasp was the geopolitical Heartland theory: "If Great Britain goes down, the Axis powers will control the continents of Europe, Asia, Africa, Australasia, and the high seas—and they will be in a position to bring enormous military and naval resources against this hemisphere."

He then continued to describe the situation in Europe, punctuating his remarks with warnings of how the Nazis would use the same tactics in the Western Hemisphere, and giving vivid imagery such as "The fate of these [occupied] nations tells us what it means to live at the point of a Nazi gun." Roosevelt attacked the British prewar policy of "appeasement," calling it ineffective. Listing prior examples given by European countries, he said it was futile.

The only solution was to assist Britain ("the spearhead of resistance to world conquest") while it was still possible.

While not explicitly pledging to stay out of the war, he stated that "our national policy is not directed toward war," and argued that helping Britain now would save Americans from having to fight. "You can, therefore, nail–nail any talk about sending armies to Europe as deliberate untruth." Europe does "not ask us to do their fighting. They ask us for the implements of war, the planes, the tanks, the guns, the freighters which will enable them to fight for their liberty and for our security. Emphatically we must get these weapons to them, get them to them in sufficient volume and quickly enough, so that we and our children will be saved the agony and suffering of war which others have had to endure."

He urged this to change, all the while stressing that open war would not hurt the country: "the strength of this nation shall not be diluted by the failure of the Government to protect the economic well-being of its citizens." He focused on that theme of "splendid cooperation between the Government and industry and labor" for several paragraphs, cited how American labor would make an impact in the combat zones, and noted how important the manufacture of weapons and vehicles is to being strong, as a nation.

He warned against labor disputes, saying, "The nation expects our defense industries to continue operation without interruption by strikes or lockouts. It expects and insists that management and workers will reconcile their differences by voluntary or legal means."

Roosevelt stressed that it was not the American government but the American people who had the power to turn the tide of the war. It was here that he used the phrase "arsenal of democracy": "We must be the great arsenal of democracy. For us this is an emergency as serious as war itself. We must apply ourselves to our task with the same resolution, the same sense of urgency, the same spirit of patriotism and sacrifice as we would show were we at war." Finally he reassured the American people: "I believe that the Axis powers are not going to win this war."

== Impact ==
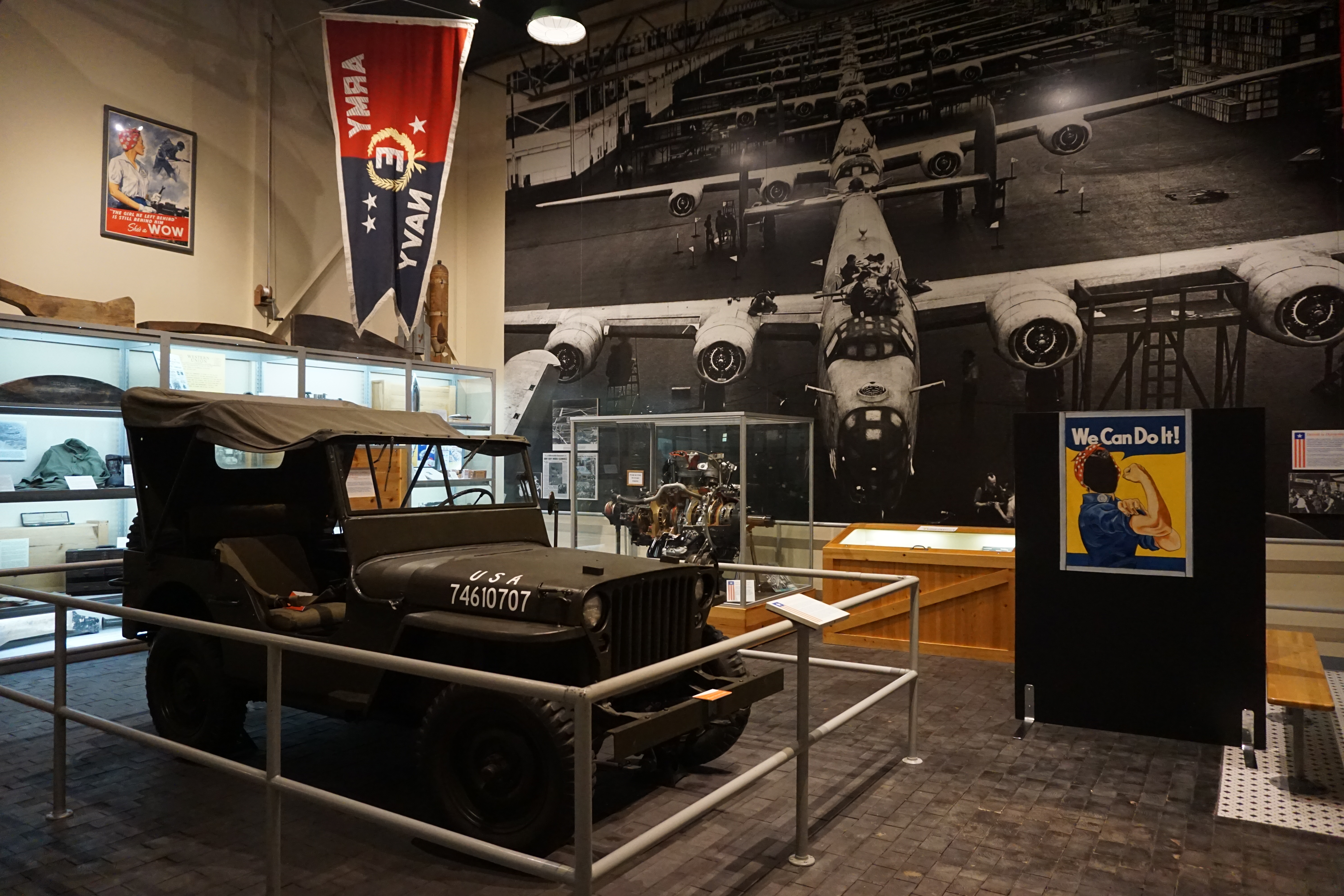
The Arsenal of Democracy exhibit at the Michigan History Museum

The speech reflected the American approach to entry into World War II. It marked the decline of the isolationist and non-interventionist doctrine that had dominated interwar U.S. foreign policy since the United States' involvement in World War I. At the time, while the United States Navy appeared strong and was widely thought to guarantee the Western Hemisphere would be safe from invasion, there were only 458,365 non-Coast Guard military personnel on active duty—259,028 in the Army, 160,997 in the Navy, and 28,345 in the Marine Corps. By the next year, that number had nearly quadrupled, with 1,801,101 total military personnel—1,462,315 in the Army, 284,437 in the Navy, and 54,359 in the Marine Corps.

Previous policies such as the Neutrality Acts had already begun to be replaced by intensified assistance to the Allies, including the cash and carry policy in 1939 and Destroyers for Bases Agreement in September 1940. The Lend-Lease program began in March 1941, several months after the Arsenal of Democracy address. After the Japanese attack on Pearl Harbor in December 1941—less than a year after the Arsenal of Democracy address—the United States entered the war.

== United States armament manufacturers ==
The spending on military production was distributed 32% for aircraft, 14.8% for ships, 25.6% for ordnance (guns, ammunition and military vehicles), 4.9% for electronics, and the remaining 22.7% for fuels, clothing, construction materials, and food. Note that production costs fell steadily—the same item cost much less to produce in 1945 than in 1942. The largest United States military prime contractors are listed below in order of the total value of munitions produced from June 1940 through September 1944. These large firms produced many different items; the aircraft companies assembled parts made by thousands of firms.

1. General Motors, trucks, tanks, aircraft parts
2. Curtiss-Wright, aircraft engines
3. Ford Motor Company, trucks, aircraft
4. Convair, aircraft
5. Douglas Aircraft Company, aircraft
6. United Aircraft, aircraft parts
7. Bethlehem Steel, ships
8. Chrysler, tanks, electronics, trucks
9. General Electric, electrical parts, engines
10. Lockheed Corporation, aircraft
11. North American Aviation, aircraft
12. Boeing, aircraft
13. AT&T Corporation, telephones
14. Glenn L. Martin Company, aircraft
15. DuPont, chemicals, ammunition, atomic bomb parts
16. U.S. Steel, steel
17. Bendix Aviation, aircraft parts
18. Packard, aircraft engines
19. Sperry Corporation, electronics
20. Kaiser Shipyards, ships
21. Westinghouse Electric Company, parts
22. Grumman, aircraft
23. Newport News Shipbuilding, ships
24. Republic Aviation, aircraft
25. Bell Aircraft, aircraft
26. Todd Shipyards, ships
27. Nash-Kelvinator, parts
28. Studebaker, trucks
29. Consolidated Steel Corporation, warships
30. Goodyear Tire and Rubber Company, tires
31. Esso, gasoline & oil
32. Avco, aircraft parts
33. International Harvester, trucks
34. American Locomotive Company, tanks
35. Western Cartridge Company, ammunition
36. American Car and Foundry Company, tanks
37. United States Rubber Company, rubber parts
38. Continental Motors, Inc., aircraft parts
39. Sunoco, gasoline & oil
40. Baldwin Locomotive Works, tanks
41. Pressed Steel Car Company, tanks
42. Permanente Metals, ships, incendiary bombs
43. RCA, radios
44. Caterpillar Inc., tanks
45. Allis-Chalmers, parts

== See also ==
- Proxy war

== References and further reading ==
- Herman, Aurther. Freedom's Forge: How American Business Produced Victory in World War II. (2013)
- Hyde, Charles K. Arsenal of Democracy: The American Automobile Industry in World War II. (Wayne State UP, 2013). ISBN 978-0-81-433951-0
- Jordan, Jonathan W. American Warlords: How Roosevelt's High Command Led America to Victory in World War II (NAL/Caliber 2015).
- Kennedy, David M. Freedom from Fear: The American People in Depression and War, 1929–1945. 1999. pp 468–69. ISBN 978-0-19-514403-1
- Klein, Maury. A call to arms: Mobilizing America for World War II (Bloomsbury, 2013).
- Complete text and audio of speech
- Speech at Wikisource
