= Boritt =

Boritt is a surname. Notable people with the surname include:

- Beowulf Boritt, American scenic designer for theater
- Gabor Boritt (1940–2026), American historian
- Jake Boritt, American documentary filmmaker and producer

== See also ==
- Borrett, another surname
