= Raymond Kingshott =

Australian-born English cricketer

Personal information
- Full name: Raymond Kingshott
- Born: 13 January 1957 (age 69); Merriwa, New South Wales, Australia
- Batting: Left-handed
- Bowling: Slow left-arm orthodox

Domestic team information
- Years: Team
- 1993–1994: Hertfordshire
- 1987–1992: Norfolk

Career statistics
Competition	List A
Matches	3
Runs scored	18
Batting average	18.00
100s/50s	0/0
Top score	9
Balls bowled	180
Wickets	1
Bowling average	99.00
5 wickets in innings	0
10 wickets in match	–
Best bowling	1/29
Catches/stumpings	2/–
- Source: Cricinfo, 29 June 2011

Raymond Kingshott (born 13 January 1957) is an Australian born former English cricketer. Kingshott was a left-handed batsman who bowled slow left-arm orthodox. He was born in Merriwa, Australia.

Kingshott made his debut for Norfolk in the 1987 MCCA Knockout Trophy against Suffolk. Kingshott played Minor counties cricket for Norfolk from 1987 to 1992, which included 50 Minor Counties Championship matches and 11 MCCA Knockout Trophy matches. He made his List A debut against Yorkshire in the 1990 NatWest Trophy. He made 2 further List A appearances, against Gloucestershire in the 1991 NatWest Trophy and Leicestershire in the 1992 NatWest Trophy. In his 3 List A matches, he scored 18 runs and took a single for the cost of 99 runs!

Leaving Norfolk at the end of the 1992 season, Kingshott joined Hertfordshire, where he played Minor counties cricket in 1993 and 1994 season.
