= Martin Wright (cricketer, born 1934) =

English cricketer

Thomas Martin Wright (16 October 1934 – 21 March 2002) was an English cricketer. He was a right-handed batsman and a right-arm fast bowler who played for Norfolk. He was born in Wombwell, Yorkshire.

Wright made a single List A appearance, in the Gillette Cup competition of 1965. From the tailend, he scored 1 not out, though this was not enough to save the team from a heavy defeat against Hampshire.

Wright continued to represent Norfolk in the Minor Counties Championship until the end of the 1965 season.
