= Ian Battelley =

English cricketer

Ian Battelley (born 19 January 1944) was an English cricketer. He was a right-handed batsman and a right-arm medium-pace bowler who played for Norfolk. He was born in Dereham.

Battelley played a single game for the Northamptonshire Second XI, his sole contribution to the game being an innings of 13 with the bat.

Battelley played one List A match for Norfolk, in the 1970 Gillette Cup competition, contributing 29 runs with the bat. From the following season onwards, he played for Norfolk in the Minor Counties Championship, until his final game for the side in 1982.

In 2003, Battelley played a single game for Norfolk Over-50s in the Over-50s Championship. Battelley's brother, Barry, played in the Minor Counties Championship for Norfolk between 1969 and 1980.
