= Matthew Boyden (cricketer) =

English cricketer (born 1979)

Personal information
- Full name: Matthew Kavan Leslie Boyden
- Born: 24 February 1979 (age 47); King's Lynn, Norfolk, England
- Batting: Right-handed
- Role: Wicket-keeper

Domestic team information
- Years: Team
- 1996–1999: Norfolk

Career statistics
Competition	List A
Matches	3
Runs scored	8
Batting average	–
100s/50s	–/–
Top score	8*
Balls bowled	–
Wickets	–
Bowling average	–
5 wickets in innings	–
10 wickets in match	–
Best bowling	–
Catches/stumpings	3/–
- Source: Cricinfo, 28 June 2011

Matthew Kavan Leslie Boyden (born 24 February 1979) is a former English cricketer. Boyden was a right-handed batsman who fielded as a wicket-keeper. He was born in King's Lynn, Norfolk.

Boyden made his debut for Norfolk in the 1996 Minor Counties Championship against Bedfordshire. Boyden played Minor counties cricket for Norfolk from 1996 to 1999, which included 26 Minor Counties Championship matches and 11 MCCA Knockout Trophy matches. He made his List A debut against Warwickshire in the 1997 NatWest Trophy. He made 2 further List A appearances, against Durham in the 1998 NatWest Trophy and the Surrey Cricket Board in the 1999 NatWest Trophy. In his 3 List A matches, he batted just once, scoring an unbeaten 8 runs against Warwickshire.
