= Richard Farrow =

English cricketer (born 1972)

Personal information
- Full name: Richard Daniel Ellis Farrow
- Born: 31 August 1972 (age 54); Grays, Essex, England
- Batting: Left-handed

Domestic team information
- Years: Team
- 1991–1993: Norfolk

Career statistics
Competition	List A
Matches	2
Runs scored	21
Batting average	10.50
100s/50s	–/–
Top score	16
Balls bowled	–
Wickets	–
Bowling average	–
5 wickets in innings	–
10 wickets in match	–
Best bowling	–
Catches/stumpings	–/–
- Source: Cricinfo, 29 June 2011

Richard Daniel Ellis Farrow (born 31 August 1972) is an English cricketer. Farrow is a left-handed batsman. He was born in Grays, Essex.

Farrow made his debut for Norfolk in the 1991 Minor Counties Championship against Bedfordshire. Farrow played Minor counties cricket for Norfolk from 1991 to 1993, which included 21 Minor Counties Championship matches and 4 MCCA Knockout Trophy matches. He made his List A debut against Leicestershire in the 1992 NatWest Trophy. In this match, he scored 5 runs before being dismissed by David Millns. He made a further List A appearance against Warwickshire in the 1993 NatWest Trophy. In this match, he scored 16 runs before being dismissed by Neil Smith.
