= Christopher Carey (cricketer) =

English cricketer (born 1973)

Personal information
- Full name: Christopher Stephen Carey
- Born: 3 April 1973 (age 53); Chelmsford, Essex, England
- Batting: Right-handed
- Bowling: Left-arm fast-medium

Domestic team information
- Years: Team
- 1992–2003: Norfolk

Career statistics
Competition	List A
Matches	2
Runs scored	43
Batting average	21.50
100s/50s	0/0
Top score	23
Balls bowled	30
Wickets	1
Bowling average	15.00
5 wickets in innings	0
10 wickets in match	0
Best bowling	1/15
Catches/stumpings	1/–
- Source: Cricinfo, 28 June 2011

Christopher Stephen Carey (born 3 April 1973) is a former English cricketer. Carey was a right-handed batsman who bowled left-arm fast-medium. He was born in Chelmsford, Essex.

Carey made his debut for Norfolk in the 1992 Minor Counties Championship against Cambridgeshire. Carey played Minor counties cricket infrequently for Norfolk from 1992 to 2003, which included 17 Minor Counties Championship matches and 12 MCCA Knockout Trophy matches. He made his List A debut against Wales Minor Counties in the 2001 Cheltenham & Gloucester Trophy. In this match, he took the wicket of Jamie Sylvester for the cost of 15 runs from 5 overs, while with the bat he was run out for 23. He made a further List A appearance against the Somerset Cricket Board in the 2nd round of the 2002 Cheltenham & Gloucester Trophy, which was played in 2001. In this match, he scored 20 runs before being dismissed by Peter Trego.
