= William Rose (cricketer, born 1934) =

English cricketer

Personal information
- Full name: William Rose
- Born: 8 December 1934; Great Yarmouth, Norfolk, England
- Died: 4 November 2025 (aged 90)
- Batting: Left-handed
- Bowling: Slow left-arm orthodox

Domestic team information
- Years: Team
- 1963–1978: Norfolk

Career statistics
Competition	List A
Matches	2
Runs scored	2
Batting average	1.00
100s/50s	–/–
Top score	2
Balls bowled	72
Wickets	–
Bowling average	–
5 wickets in innings	–
10 wickets in match	–
Best bowling	–
Catches/stumpings	–/–
- Source: Cricinfo, 30 June 2011

William 'Billy' Rose (8 December 1934 – 4 November 2025) was an English cricketer. Rose was a left-handed batsman who bowled slow left-arm orthodox. He was born in Great Yarmouth, Norfolk.

Rose made his debut for Norfolk in the 1963 Minor Counties Championship against Hertfordshire. Rose played Minor counties cricket for Norfolk from 1963 to 1978, which included 96 Minor Counties Championship appearances. He made his List A debut against Hampshire in the 1965 Gillette Cup. He was dismissed for 2 runs by Bob Cottam in this match. He made a further List A appearance against Middlesex in the 1970 Gillette Cup. He bowled 12 wicket-less overs with the ball, while with the bat he dismissed for a duck by Keith Jones.

Rose died on 4 November 2025 at the age of 90.
