= Richard Belmont =

English cricketer (born 1965)

Richard Belmont (born 17 May 1965) was an English cricketer. He was a right-handed batsman and a right-arm medium-fast bowler who played for Norfolk. He was born in Dronfield, Derbyshire.

Belmont, who represented the team in the Minor Counties Championship in 1988 and the Holt Cup in 1991, made his sole List A appearance for the side in the 1991 NatWest Trophy. Belmont scored 9 runs in the match, and took figures of 1-53 from 13 overs of bowling.
