= Stephen Dixon (cricketer) =

English cricketer (born 1958)

Personal information
- Full name: Stephen Brian Dixon
- Born: 12 July 1958 (age 68); Bolton, Lancashire, England
- Batting: Left-handed
- Bowling: Slow left-arm orthodox

Domestic team information
- Years: Team
- 1986–1993: Norfolk

Career statistics
Competition	List A
Matches	3
Runs scored	7
Batting average	2.33
100s/50s	–/–
Top score	6
Balls bowled	–
Wickets	–
Bowling average	–
5 wickets in innings	–
10 wickets in match	–
Best bowling	–
Catches/stumpings	–/–
- Source: Cricinfo, 29 June 2011

Stephen Brian Dixon (born 12 July 1958) is a former English cricketer. Dixon was a left-handed batsman who bowled slow left-arm orthodox. He was born in Bolton, Lancashire.

Dixon first appeared in county cricket for the Lancashire Second XI, making 3 Minor Counties Championship appearances, spread over 1977 and 1978. Dixon made his debut for Norfolk in the 1986 MCCA Knockout Trophy against Lincolnshire. Dixon played Minor counties cricket for Norfolk from 1986 to 1993, which included 42 Minor Counties Championship matches and 14 MCCA Knockout Trophy matches. He made his List A debut against Yorkshire in the 1990 NatWest Trophy. He made 2 further List A appearances, against Gloucestershire in the 1991 NatWest Trophy and Warwickshire in the 1993 NatWest Trophy. In his 3 List A matches, he scored 7 runs at an average of 2.33, with a high score of 6.
