= Mark Thomas (cricketer) =

English cricketer (born 1977)

Personal information
- Full name: Mark Wynne Thomas
- Born: 30 January 1977 (age 49); Norwich, Norfolk, England
- Batting: Right-handed
- Bowling: Right-arm fast-medium
- Relatives: Peter Thomas (father); David Thomas (uncle)

Domestic team information
- Years: Team
- 2002–2008: Norfolk
- 2001: Cambridgeshire
- 1996–2000: Norfolk

Career statistics
Competition	List A
Matches	4
Runs scored	35
Batting average	8.75
100s/50s	0/0
Top score	26
Balls bowled	229
Wickets	1
Bowling average	182.00
5 wickets in innings	0
10 wickets in match	–
Best bowling	1/53
Catches/stumpings	1/–
- Source: Cricinfo, 28 June 2011

Mark Wynne Thomas (born 30 January 1977) is an English cricketer. Thomas is a right-handed batsman who bowls right-arm fast-medium. He was born in Norwich, Norfolk.

Thomas made his debut for Norfolk in the 1996 Minor Counties Championship against Cumberland. Thomas played Minor counties cricket for Norfolk infrequently from 1996 to 2008, which included 35 Minor Counties Championship matches and 21 MCCA Knockout Trophy matches. In 2001, he appeared in 3 MCCA Knockout Trophy matches for Cambridgeshire. He made his List A debut for Norfolk against Hampshire in the 1996 NatWest Trophy. He made 3 further List A appearances for the county, the last coming against the Surrey Cricket Board in the 1999 NatWest Trophy. In his 4 List A matches, he scored 35 runs at an average of 8.75, with a high score of 26. As a bowler, Thomas bowled 38.1 overs for the cost of 182 runs, and claiming just the one wicket.

His father, Peter and uncle, David, both played for Norfolk.
