= Darren Savage =

English cricketer

Personal information
- Full name: Darren Graham Savage
- Born: 24 September 1968 (age 58); King's Lynn, Norfolk, England
- Batting: Right-handed
- Bowling: Right-arm medium-fast

Domestic team information
- Years: Team
- 1987–1991: Norfolk

Career statistics
Competition	List A
Matches	1
Runs scored	1
Batting average	1.00
100s/50s	–/–
Top score	1
Balls bowled	–
Wickets	–
Bowling average	–
5 wickets in innings	–
10 wickets in match	–
Best bowling	–
Catches/stumpings	–/–
- Source: Cricinfo, 29 June 2011

Darren Graham Savage (born 24 September 1968) is a former English cricketer. Savage was a right-handed batsman who bowled right-arm medium-fast. He was born in King's Lynn, Norfolk.

Savage made his debut for Norfolk in the 1987 Minor Counties Championship against Staffordshire. Savage played Minor counties cricket for Norfolk from 1987 to 1990, which included 12 Minor Counties Championship matches. He made his only List A appearance in 1991 against Gloucestershire in the NatWest Trophy. In this match, he scored a single run before being dismissed by Richard Scott. He didn't appear again for Norfolk after this match.
