= Alan Halford =

English cricketer

Personal information
- Full name: Alan John Halford
- Born: 1 November 1934; Leicester, Leicestershire, England
- Died: 25 September 1984 (aged 49); Málaga, Spain
- Batting: Unknown
- Bowling: Right-arm fast-medium

Domestic team information
- Years: Team
- 1967–1970: Norfolk

Career statistics
Competition	List A
Matches	2
Runs scored	5
Batting average	2.50
100s/50s	–/–
Top score	5
Balls bowled	144
Wickets	2
Bowling average	53.50
5 wickets in innings	–
10 wickets in match	–
Best bowling	1/34
Catches/stumpings	2/–
- Source: Cricinfo, 29 June 2011

Alan John Halford (1 November 1934 – 25 September 1984) was an English cricketer. Halford's batting style is unknown, but he was a right-arm fast-medium bowler. He was born in Leicester, Leicestershire.

Halford made his debut for Norfolk in the 1967 Minor Counties Championship against Staffordshire. Halford played Minor counties cricket for Norfolk from 1967 to 1969, which included 18 Minor Counties Championship appearances. He made his List A debut against Yorkshire in the 1969 Gillette Cup. In this match, he took the wicket of Phil Sharpe for the cost of 34 runs from 12 overs, while with the bat he was dismissed for 5 runs by Chris Old. He made a further List A appearance against Middlesex in the 1970 Gillette Cup. In this match, he took the wicket of Clive Radley for the cost of 73 runs from 12 overs, while with the bat he was dismissed for a duck by John Price.
