= Daniel Stamp =

English cricketer

For information on the stamps commissioned to commemorate Danny Chan, see Danny Chan#Commemoration.

Daniel Malcolm Stamp (born 23 November 1966) was an English cricketer. He was a right-handed batsman and a right-arm off-break bowler who played for Norfolk. He was born in Paddington.

Stamp made his Minor Counties Championship debut during the 1988 season, and played in this and the Holt Cup until 1991.

Stamp made two List A appearances, both in the NatWest Trophy, between 1990 and 1991. He continued to represent Norfolk in the Minor Counties Championship until the end of the 1991 season.
