= Steven Taylor (English cricketer) =

English cricketer

Personal information
- Full name: Steven Kirby Taylor
- Born: 28 November 1963 (age 62); York, Yorkshire, England
- Batting: Right-handed

Domestic team information
- Years: Team
- 1991–1992: Norfolk

Career statistics
Competition	List A
Matches	1
Runs scored	0
Batting average	0.00
100s/50s	0/0
Top score	0
Catches/stumpings	0/–
- Source: Cricinfo, 29 June 2011

Steven Kirby Taylor (born 28 November 1963) is a former English cricketer. Taylor was a right-handed batsman. He was born in York, Yorkshire.

Taylor made his debut for Norfolk in the 1991 Minor Counties Championship against Lincolnshire. Taylor played three further Minor Counties Championship matches in 1991. The following season he made his only List A appearance against Leicestershire in the NatWest Trophy. In this match, he was dismissed for a duck by David Millns. He made no further appearances for Norfolk following this match.
