= Mark Whitaker (cricketer) =

English cricketer

Personal information
- Full name: Mark Robin Whitaker
- Born: 20 September 1946 (age 80); Walton-on-Thames, Surrey, England
- Batting: Right-handed
- Bowling: Right-arm fast-medium
- Role: Bowler

Domestic team information
- Years: Team
- 1969: Norfolk
- 1965–1967: Cambridge University

Career statistics
Competition	First-class	List A
Matches	12	1
Runs scored	16	2
Batting average	1.23	–
100s/50s	0/0	0/0
Top score	4*	2*
Balls bowled	1,522	42
Wickets	20	0
Bowling average	34.95	–
5 wickets in innings	1	0
10 wickets in match	0	–
Best bowling	5/62	–
Catches/stumpings	2/–	3/–
- Source: Cricinfo, 29 June 2011

Mark Robin Whitaker (born 20 September 1946) is a former English cricketer. Whitaker was a right-handed batsman who bowled right-arm fast-medium. He was born in Walton-on-Thames, Surrey.

Whitaker made his first-class debut for Cambridge University against Surrey in 1965. He made 11 further first-class appearances for the university, the last of which came against Warwickshire in 1967. A bowler, he took 20 wickets in his 12 first-class matches, which came at an average of 34.95. He took a single five-wicket haul, taking 5/62 against Middlesex in 1965.

In 1969, he made his only appearance for Norfolk in a List A match against Yorkshire in the Gillette Cup. In this match, he bowled 7 wicket-less overs for the cost of 20 runs, while with the bat he ended Norfolk's innings unbeaten on 2.

Playing for Cambridge University against New Zealand in 1965, he took three wickets in the first innings and two in the second – Bevan Congdon, Graham Dowling (twice) and John Reid (twice) – before becoming the first bowler in English cricket to be banned from bowling for running on the pitch.
