= Peter Thomas (cricketer, born 1952) =

English cricketer

Personal information
- Full name: Peter Wynne Thomas
- Born: 11 April 1952 (age 74); Swardeston, Norfolk, England
- Batting: Right-handed
- Bowling: Right-arm fast-medium
- Role: Bowler
- Relatives: David Thomas (brother); Mark Thomas (son)

Domestic team information
- Years: Team
- 1982–1986: Norfolk

Career statistics
Competition	List A
Matches	1
Runs scored	0
Batting average	0.00
100s/50s	0/0
Top score	0
Balls bowled	60
Wickets	2
Bowling average	17.50
5 wickets in innings	0
10 wickets in match	–
Best bowling	2/35
Catches/stumpings	0/–
- Source: ESPNcricinfo, 4 April 2020

Peter Wynne Thomas (born 11 April 1952) is a former English cricketer. Thomas was a right-handed batsman who bowled right-arm fast-medium. He was born in Swardeston, Norfolk.

Thomas made his debut for Norfolk in the 1982 Minor Counties Championship against Buckinghamshire. Thomas played Minor counties cricket for Norfolk from 1982 to 1986, which included seven Minor Counties Championship matches and two MCCA Knockout Trophy matches. He played a single List A match for Norfolk against Glamorgan in the opening round of the 1983 NatWest Trophy where he took two wickets and was dismissed for a duck.

Thomas joined the East Anglian Premier Cricket League side Swardeston in 1999, where he played five games. From 2002 to 2010, Thomas played in the Over-50s County Championship for Norfolk.

His brother, David, and son, Mark Thomas, both played for Norfolk.
