= David Thomas (cricketer, born 1963) =

English cricketer

Personal information
- Full name: David Robert Thomas
- Born: 26 January 1963 (age 63); Swardeston, Norfolk, England
- Batting: Left-handed
- Bowling: Right-arm fast-medium
- Relatives: Peter Thomas (brother); Mark Thomas (nephew)

Domestic team information
- Years: Team
- 1990–1995: Minor Counties
- 1983–1999: Norfolk

Career statistics
Competition	First-class	List A
Matches	1	20
Runs scored	27	346
Batting average	27.00	23.06
100s/50s	0/0	0/2
Top score	27	70*
Balls bowled	90	804
Wickets	0	21
Bowling average	–	30.80
5 wickets in innings	0	0
10 wickets in match	0	–
Best bowling	–	3/34
Catches/stumpings	0/–	3/–
- Source: Cricinfo, 29 June 2011

David Robert Thomas (born 26 January 1963) is a former English cricketer. Thomas was a left-handed batsman who bowled right-arm fast-medium. He was born in Swardeston, Norfolk.

Thomas made his debut for Norfolk in the 1983 Minor Counties Championship against Suffolk. Thomas played Minor counties cricket for Norfolk from 1983 to 1999, which included 122 Minor Counties Championship matches and 42 MCCA Knockout Trophy matches. He made his List A debut for Norfolk against Hampshire in the 1984 NatWest Trophy. He made 11 further List A matches for Norfolk, the last of which came against the Surrey Cricket Board in the 1999 NatWest Trophy. In his 12 limited-overs appearances for Norfolk, he scored 256 runs at an average of 25.60. He made 2 half centuries, with his highest score of 70 not out coming against the Surrey Cricket Board in 1999. With the ball, Thomas took 13 wickets at a bowling average of 27.76, with best figures of 3/34.

Playing for Norfolk allowed Thomas to represent the Minor Counties cricket team. He made a single first-class appearance for the team in 1990, against the touring Indians. He batted once in this match, scoring 27 runs in the Minor Counties first-innings, before being dismissed by Anil Kumble. With the ball, he bowled 15 wicket-less overs. He also appeared for the team in List A cricket, making his debut in that format for the Minor Counties against Somerset in the 1990 Benson & Hedges Cup. He 7 further List A matches for the team, the last coming against Durham in the 1995 Benson & Hedges Cup. In his 8 limited-overs matches for the team, he scored 90 runs at an average of 18.00, with a high score of 49 not out. With the ball, he took 8 wickets at an average of 35.75, with best figures of 3/34.

His brother, Peter, and nephew, Mark Thomas, both played for Norfolk.
