= 1600 Daily =

Former government newsletter

- Categories: News
- Frequency: Daily
- First issue: March 2017; 9 years ago
- Country: United States
- Language: English
- Website: www.whitehouse.gov/1600daily/

1600 Daily was an online newsletter started in March 2017. It was a part of the whitehouse.gov website and posted stories daily as well as sending emails with news to anyone who signs up. The news focused on what was happening in the White House. Other details such as the president's schedule and upcoming dates were included.

== History ==
1600 Daily was launched by the Trump administration in March 2017. Also called the West Wing Report, the newsletter would come in an email and include: a photo of the day, an article about the President or Vice President, and the schedule for the President that day. Although the intention was for it to be an "email newsletter, meant to be read in the inbox," anyone could view the newsletter by visiting the website.

1600 Daily was discontinued under the new Biden administration, and the original link redirects to the "Briefing Room" part of the whitehouse.gov site.
