= Paul Whittaker (cricketer) =

English cricketer (born 1956)

Personal information
- Full name: Paul Kevin Whittaker
- Born: 7 August 1956 (age 70); Oxford, Oxfordshire, England
- Batting: Right-handed
- Bowling: Right-arm fast-medium

Domestic team information
- Years: Team
- 1983–1989: Norfolk

Career statistics
Competition	List A
Matches	2
Runs scored	5
Batting average	5.00
100s/50s	–/–
Top score	4*
Balls bowled	102
Wickets	1
Bowling average	30.00
5 wickets in innings	–
10 wickets in match	–
Best bowling	1/5
Catches/stumpings	1/–
- Source: Cricinfo, 29 June 2011

Paul Kevin Whittaker (born 7 August 1957) is a former English cricketer. Whittaker was a right-handed batsman who bowled right-arm fast-medium. He was born in Oxford, Oxfordshire.

Whittaker made his debut for Norfolk in the 1983 MCCA Knockout Trophy against Berkshire. Whittaker played Minor counties cricket for Norfolk from 1983 to 1989, which included 27 Minor Counties Championship matches and 13 MCCA Knockout Trophy matches. He made his List A debut against Hampshire in the 1984 NatWest Trophy. In this match, he ended the Norfolk innings not out on 4, while with the ball he took the wicket of Chris Smith for the cost of 5 runs from 7 overs. He made a further List A appearance against Leicestershire in the 1985 NatWest Trophy. In this match, he was dismissed for a single run by Les Taylor, while with the ball he bowled 10 wicket-less overs.
