= David Morrell (cricketer) =

Welsh cricketer

Personal information
- Full name: David Mark Morrell
- Born: 8 October 1971 (age 55); Newport, Monmouthshire, Wales
- Batting: Right-handed
- Role: Wicket-keeper

Domestic team information
- Years: Team
- 1991–1992: Norfolk

Career statistics
Competition	List A
Matches	1
Runs scored	6
Batting average	6.00
100s/50s	0/0
Top score	6
Catches/stumpings	0/0
- Source: Cricinfo, 28 June 2011

David Mark Morrell (born 8 October 1971) is a former Welsh cricketer. Morrell was a right-handed batsman who fielded as a wicket-keeper. He was born in Newport, Monmouthshire.

Morrell made his debut for Norfolk in the 1991 Minor Counties Championship against Bedfordshire. Morrell played Minor counties cricket for Norfolk from 1991 to 1992, which included 8 Minor Counties Championship matches and 2 MCCA Knockout Trophy matches. He made his only List A appearance against Leicestershire in the 1992 NatWest Trophy. In this match, he scored 6 runs before being dismissed by Justin Benson.
