= Robert Bradford (cricketer) =

English cricketer (born 1952)

Robert Leslie Bradford (born 29 April 1952) was an English cricketer. He was a right-handed batsman who played for Norfolk County Cricket Club. He was born at Swardeston in 1952 and played cricket for the village side.

Bradford played for Norfolk in the Minor Counties Championship between 1978 and 1988 making a total of 39 appearances for the side and scoring 1,374 runs in the competition. He led the county's batting averagess in 1979 and scored his only century for the side in 1981, the year in which he was also awarded his county cap. He played in two Minor Counties Trophy one-day matches for the side in 1984 and made a single List A appearance in the 1984 NatWest Trophy against Hampshire scoring a single run in the match.

== Bibliography ==
- Hounsome K (2015) A Game Well Played: a history of cricket in Norfolk. Norwich: Hounsome. ISBN 978-0-9932296-0-2
