= Sheila Borrett =

British radio presenter (1905–1986)

- Born: Margaret Sheila Graham; 20 June 1905; Harrow, Middlesex, England
- Died: 30 April 1986 (aged 80); Clearwater, Florida, U.S.
- Other names: Sheila Stewart; Mrs Giles Borrett; Sheila Wasey
- Occupations: Radio broadcaster, actress, radio station programmer
- Years active: 1930s–1970s

Sheila Borrett (born Margaret Sheila Graham; 20 June 1905 – 30 April 1986) was a British radio presenter, the first female announcer on the BBC’s National Service. At the time of her work as a BBC announcer she was referred to as Mrs Giles Borrett, but she generally used the stage name Sheila Stewart, or during a later marriage Sheila Wasey.

== Life and career ==
She was born in Harrow, Middlesex, England. She was a theatrical actress known as Sheila Stewart when she first appeared in plays broadcast by the BBC, and married Giles Borrett in 1930. She had ambitions of becoming an announcer, and was employed by the BBC in a well-publicised initiative in July 1933, to become the first ever female announcer on the station. She later said that she was hired for her strong, low-pitched voice, adding: "In those days, radio was so bad technically that a woman's high-pitched voice was very displeasing to the ear." After just three months, she was removed from the position in November 1933 after the BBC received thousands of complaints from listeners who were uncomfortable with hearing a woman announcer.

After she and her husband opened a cleaning business in 1934, she continued to work occasionally as an actress at the BBC, especially in reading novels aloud for broadcast. She and Borrett divorced; she then married Ian Cox, a former BBC colleague, in March 1940. They divorced in July 1945. She continued to broadcast for the BBC, as an announcer, during and after the Second World War. She married an American, Gager Wasey, and moved to the United States in 1952, becoming a naturalized citizen in 1961. In 1967, as Sheila Wasey, she was working as Programme Director at WQXM (FM) in Clearwater, Florida. After her husband's death in 1970, she moved to Dunedin, and from the 1970s, again using the name Sheila Stewart, she hosted programmes at WUSF (FM) in Tampa.

She died in 1986 at Morton Plant Hospital in Clearwater, aged 80, after suffering a stroke.

== Legacy ==
The University of South Florida created a memorial fund to commemorate her broadcasting career. She was featured in the book Behind the Wireless: An Early History of Women at the BBC by Kate Murphy and The Untold Story of the Talking Book by Matthew Rubery.
