= Matthew Wilkinson (cricketer) =

English cricketer (born 1980)

Matthew Owen Wilkinson (born 17 December 1980) is an English cricketer. He was a right-handed batsman who played for Norfolk. He was born in Norwich.

Having represented Norfolk in the Minor Counties Championship and Minor Counties Trophy between 2002 and 2006, Wilkinson made a single List A appearance for the team, in the C&G Trophy in August 2003.

Wilkinson scored a duck in the match and took one catch.

As of 2009, Wilkinson still represents Horsford in the East Anglian Premier Cricket League.
