= Christopher Borrett =

English cricketer

Personal information
- Full name: Christopher Richard Borrett
- Born: 2 December 1979 (age 46); North Walsham, Norfolk, England
- Batting: Right-handed
- Bowling: Right-arm fast-medium
- Relatives: Paul Borrett (father)

Domestic team information
- Years: Team
- 2000–present: Norfolk

Career statistics
Competition	List A
Matches	5
Runs scored	15
Batting average	3.75
100s/50s	–/–
Top score	10
Balls bowled	18
Wickets	–
Bowling average	–
5 wickets in innings	–
10 wickets in match	–
Best bowling	–
Catches/stumpings	–/–
- Source: Cricinfo, 28 June 2011

Christopher Richard Borrett (born 2 December 1979) is an English cricketer. Borrett is a right-handed batsman who bowls right-arm fast-medium. He was born in North Walsham, Norfolk and educated at Langley School and Harper Adams Agricultural College.

Borrett made his debut for Norfolk in the 2000 Minor Counties Championship against Cambridgeshire. Borrett has played Minor counties cricket for Norfolk from 2000 to present, which has included 53 Minor Counties Championship matches and 40 MCCA Knockout Trophy matches. He made his List A debut against the Netherlands in the 1st round of the 2002 Cheltenham & Gloucester Trophy, which was played in 2001. He made 4 further List A appearances, the last coming against Lincolnshire in the 1st round of the 2004 Cheltenham & Gloucester Trophy, which was played in 2003. In his 5 List A matches, he scored 15 runs at an average of 3.75, with a high score of 10. With the ball, he bowled a total of 3 wicket-less overs.

His father, Paul, played List A cricket for Norfolk.
