= Paul Borrett =

English cricketer (born 1944)

Paul Clarke Borrett (born 1 February 1944) is a former English cricketer. A right-handed batsman and leg-break bowler, he played for Norfolk. He was born in Martham.

Borrett, who played in the Minor Counties Championship for Norfolk between 1970, and 1978, made a single List A appearance for the side, in the 1970 Gillette Cup. From the lower-middle order, he scored a single run.

Borrett's son, Christopher, played List A cricket, while another son, Andrew, was a scorer.
