= 1968 Gillette Cup =

- Administrator: Test and County Cricket Board
- Cricket format: Limited overs cricket (60 overs per innings)
- Tournament format: Knockout
- Champions: Warwickshire (2nd title)
- Participants: 22
- Matches: 21
- Most runs: 246 – Garfield Sobers (Nottinghamshire)
- Most wickets: 10 – Antony Durose (Northamptonshire)

The 1968 Gillette Cup was the sixth Gillette Cup, an English limited overs county cricket tournament. It was held between 27 April and 7 September 1968. The tournament was won by Warwickshire County Cricket Club who defeated Sussex County Cricket Club by 4 wickets in the final at Lord's.

The newly launched London Weekend Television won the rights to show the final throughout the ITV network, considered a major coup when set alongside the strong association the BBC then had with cricket (and would for another thirty years). They received huge opprobrium from the press and public for cutting away from the match near its climax to show adverts, and LWT – already facing serious problems because of an industrial dispute and because much of its output was considered too high-minded for ITV – would never cover cricket again.

== Format ==
The 17 first-class counties, were joined by five Minor Counties: Bedfordshire, Cheshire, Dorset, Durham and Norfolk. Teams who won in the first round progressed to the second round. The winners in the second round then progressed to the quarter-final stage. Winners from the quarter-finals then progressed to the semi-finals from which the winners then went on to the final at Lord's which was held on 7 September 1968.

== First round ==
27 April 1968
Scorecard

Lancashire; 168 (59.2 overs)	v	Nottinghamshire; 169/7 (50 overs)
John Sullivan 61; Mike Taylor 4/31 (12 overs)		Garfield Sobers 75; Ken Shuttleworth 4/34 (12 overs)

Nottinghamshire won by 3 wickets
Trent Bridge, Nottingham
Umpires: Ron Aspinall and Arthur Jepson
Player of the match: Garfield Sobers (Notts)

1, 2 May 1968
Scorecard

Glamorgan; 76 (38.4 overs)	v	Northamptonshire; 79/4 (46.1 overs)
Majid Khan 17; Antony Durose 3/17 (12 overs)		Colin Milburn 29*; Jeff Jones 3/13 (12 overs)

Northamptonshire won by 6 wickets
County Ground, Northampton
Umpires: Ron Lay and Harry Mellows
Player of the match: Colin Milburn (Northants)

- Match was scheduled for one day but extended to two.

4 May 1968
Scorecard

Worcestershire; 98 (56.2 overs)	v	Durham; 82 (40.4 overs)
Tom Graveney 45; John Gordon Williamson 4/13 (10.2 overs)		Alan Burridge 26; Brian Brain 4/13 (8.4 overs)

Worcestershire won by 16 runs
Ropery Lane, Chester-le-Street
Umpires: Dusty Rhodes and Tom Spencer
Player of the match: Stuart Young (Durham)

4, 6 May 1968
Scorecard

Middlesex; 161 (60 overs)	v	Essex; 155 (59.4 overs)
Eric Russell 26; Robin Hobbs 3/11 (1 overs)		Gordon Barker 39; John Price 3/22 (12 overs)

Middlesex won by 6 runs
Lord's, London
Umpires: Albert Alderman and John Langridge
Player of the match: Keith Boyce (Essex)

- Match was scheduled for one day but extended to two.

8 May 1968
Scorecard

Norfolk; 208 (59.1 overs)	v	Cheshire; 212/9 (59.4 overs)
Graham Saville 73; Arthur Sutton 3/29 (11.1 overs)		Patrick Briggs 60; John Shepperd 3/23 (12 overs)

Cheshire won by 1 wicket
Macclesfield Cricket Club Ground, Macclesfield
Umpires: Arthur Fagg and Albert Gaskell
Player of the match: Patrick Briggs (Ches)

8, 9 May 1968
Scorecard

Dorset; 102 (52.4 overs)	v	Bedfordshire; 103/2 (40.1 overs)
John Baker 20; Graham Jarrett 3/21 (12 overs)		Geoff Millman 54*; Derek Hayward 2/18 (12 overs)

Bedfordshire won by 8 wickets
Sherborne School, Sherborne
Umpires: Cec Pepper and George Pope
Player of the match: Geoff Millman (Beds)

- Match was scheduled for one day but extended to two.

== Second round ==
25, 27 May 1968
Scorecard

Hampshire; 321/4 (60 overs)	v	Bedfordshire; 197/7 (60 overs)
Roy Marshall 140; Trevor Rosier 2/68 (12 overs)		Trevor Rosier 52; Peter Sainsbury 3/44 (12 overs)

Hampshire won by 124 runs
Goldington Bury, Bedford
Umpires: Arthur Jepson and Cec Pepper
Player of the match: Roy Marshall (Hants)

- Match was scheduled for one day but extended to two.

25, 27 May 1968
Scorecard

Cheshire; 163 (56.4 overs)	v	Northamptonshire; 165/1 (52.4 overs)
Stuart Wood 49; Colin Milburn 4/40 (12 overs)		Brian Reynolds 68*; Frederick Millett 1/28 (10 overs)

Northamptonshire won by 9 wickets
Macclesfield Cricket Club Ground, Macclesfield
Umpires: Harry Mellows and George Pope
Player of the match: Colin Milburn (Northants)

- Match was scheduled for one day but extended to two.

25, 27 May 1968
Scorecard

Kent; 110 (60 overs)	v	Gloucestershire; 111/9 (58.2 overs)
Brian Luckhurst 50; Tony Brown 4/17 (12 overs)		Mike Bissex 23; Asif Iqbal 2/13 (6 overs)

Gloucestershire won by 1 wicket
Ashley Down Ground, Bristol
Umpires: Albert Alderman and Charlie Elliott
Player of the match: Tony Brown (Glos)

- Match was scheduled for one day but extended to two.

25, 27 May 1968
Scorecard

Somerset; 134 (57 overs)	v	Leicestershire; 135/6 (49 overs)
Roy Virgin 55; Terry Spencer 3/17 (10 overs)		Mick Norman 52; Fred Rumsey 2/26 (12 overs)

Leicestershire won by 4 wickets
Grace Road, Leicester
Umpires: Ron Aspinall and Tom Spencer
Player of the match: Mick Norman (Leics)

- Match was scheduled for one day but extended to two.

25, 27 May 1968
Scorecard

Middlesex; 220/8 (60 overs)	v	Surrey; 117 (37.4 overs)
Eric Russell 123; Geoff Arnold 2/35 (12 overs)		Stewart Storey 40; Bob Herman 6/42 (12 overs)

Middlesex won by 103 runs
Lord's, London
Umpires: Laurie Gray and Hugo Yarnold
Player of the match: Eric Russell (Middx)

- Match was scheduled for one day but extended to two.

25 May 1968
Scorecard

Derbyshire; 97 (43.2 overs)	v	Sussex; 99/0 (41.5 overs)
David Smith 32; Tony Buss 4/22 (11.2 overs)		Mike Buss 50*

Sussex won by 10 wickets
County Ground, Hove
Umpires: John Arnold and Jack Crapp
Player of the match: Tony Greig (Sussex)

25, 27, 28 May 1968
Scorecard

Yorkshire; 171/9 (60 overs)	v	Warwickshire; 172/6 (57.5 overs)
Phil Sharpe 38; Tom Cartwright 2/22 (12 overs)		Dennis Amiss 72; Chris Old 2/38 (12 overs)

Warwickshire won by 4 wickets
Edgbaston, Birmingham
Umpires: Syd Buller and Eddie Phillipson
Player of the match: Dennis Amiss (Warks)

- Match was scheduled for one day but extended to three.

18 June 1968
Scorecard

Nottinghamshire; 226/9 (60 overs)	v	Worcestershire; 178 (57.1 overs)
Garfield Sobers 95*; Brian Brain 3/38 (12 overs)		Tom Graveney 74; Garfield Sobers 4/15 (11 overs)

Nottinghamshire won by 48 runs
New Road, Worcester
Umpires: Albert Gaskell and Laurie Gray
Player of the match: Garfield Sobers (Notts)

- Match was originally scheduled for 25 May but no play was possible on the original date or the two reserve days (27 and 28 May).

== Quarter-finals ==
3 July 1968
Scorecard

Warwickshire; 220 (60 overs)	v	Hampshire; 195 (57.5 overs)
Rohan Kanhai 92; Bob Cottam 4/38 (12 overs)		Danny Livingstone 50; David Brown 3/31 (10.5 overs)

Warwickshire won by 25 runs
Dean Park Cricket Ground, Bournemouth
Umpires: Albert Alderman and John Langridge
Player of the match: Rohan Kanhai (Warks)

3 July 1968
Scorecard

Middlesex; 231 (59.5 overs)	v	Leicestershire; 213 (58 overs)
Peter Parfitt 69; Graham Cross 3/55 (11.5 overs)		Brian Booth 73; Wes Stewart 4/41 (12 overs)

Middlesex won by 18 runs
Lord's, London
Umpires: Ron Lay and George Pope
Player of the match: John Price (Middx)

3 July 1968
Scorecard

Gloucestershire; 296/8 (60 overs)	v	Nottinghamshire; 271 (57.4 overs)
David Green 90; Carlton Forbes 3/51 (12 overs)		Garfield Sobers 76; Tony Windows 3/61 (12 overs)

Gloucestershire won by 25 runs
Trent Bridge, Nottingham
Umpires: Cec Pepper and Eddie Phillipson
Player of the match: David Green (Glos)

3 July 1968
Scorecard

Sussex; 255/7 (60 overs)	v	Northamptonshire; 248 (58.2 overs)
Ken Suttle 100; Brian Crump 3/40 (12 overs)		Roger Prideaux 58; Mike Buss 4/51 (8 overs)

Sussex won by 7 runs
County Ground, Hove
Umpires: Lofty Herman and Peter Wight
Player of the match: Ken Suttle (Sussex)

== Semi-finals ==
7, 8, 9 August 1968
Scorecard

Sussex; 219 (57 overs)	v	Gloucestershire; 171 (56 overs)
Ted Dexter 62; Tony Brown 3/41 (12 overs)		Ron Nicholls 38; Don Bates 6/30 (12 overs)

Sussex won by 48 runs
County Ground, Hove
Umpires: Fred Berry and A. M. Pullinger
Player of the match: Don Bates (Sussex)

- Match was scheduled for one day but extended to three.

13 August 1968
Scorecard

Middlesex; 162/9 (60 overs)	v	Warwickshire; 165/7 (59 overs)
Ron Hooker 43*; Bill Blenkiron 4/32 (12 overs)		Rohan Kanhai 53; Ron Hooker 4/20 (12 overs)

Warwickshire won by 3 wickets
Lord's, London
Umpires: Ron Aspinall and Freddie Jakeman
Player of the match: Ron Hooker (Middx)

- Match was originally scheduled for 7 August but no play was possible on the original date or the two reserve days (8 and 9 August).

== Final ==
7 September 1968
Scorecard

Sussex; 214/7 (60 overs)	v	Warwickshire; 215/6 (57 overs)
Jim Parks 57; Khalid Ibadulla 3/25 (12 overs)		Jim Stewart 59; Mike Buss 4/42 (12 overs)

Warwickshire won by 4 wickets
Lord's, London
Umpires: Arthur Jepson and Dusty Rhodes
Player of the match: Alan Smith (Warks)
