= 1965 Gillette Cup =

- Administrator: Marylebone Cricket Club
- Cricket format: Limited overs cricket (60 overs per innings)
- Tournament format: Knockout
- Champions: Yorkshire (1st title)
- Participants: 22
- Matches: 21
- Most runs: 225 – Geoffrey Boycott (Yorkshire)
- Most wickets: 12 – Fred Trueman (Yorkshire)

The 1965 Gillette Cup was the third Gillette Cup, an English limited overs county cricket tournament. It was held between 23 April and 4 September 1965. The tournament was won by Yorkshire, following Geoffrey Boycott's 146 runs in the final at Lord's. Boycott's innings remained the highest ever scored in a Lord's county limited-overs final. until 2017.

== Format ==
The seventeen first-class counties, were joined by five Minor Counties: Berkshire, Buckinghamshire, Cambridgeshire, Norfolk and Wiltshire. Teams who won in the first round progressed to the second round. The winners in the second round then progressed to the quarter-final stage. Winners from the quarter-finals then progressed to the semi-finals from which the winners then went on to the final at Lord's which was held on 4 September 1965.

== First round ==
23 April 1965
Scorecard

| Middlesex; 269 (59 overs) | v | Buckinghamshire; 111 (38.1 overs) |
| Bob Gale 86; Colin Smith 3/32 (10 overs) | | David Janes 32; Ronald Hooker 3/29 (13 overs) |

Middlesex won by 158 runs
Lord's, London
Umpires: Arthur Fagg and John Langridge
Player of the match: Bob Gale (Middx)

28, 29 April 1965
Scorecard

| Berkshire; 137 (55.5 overs) | v | Somerset; 139/5 (45.5 overs) |
| David Mordaunt 86; Ken Palmer 3/37 (13 overs) | | Graham Atkinson 55; Frederick Baines 3/29 (13 overs) |

Somerset won by 5 wickets
Church Road, Reading
Umpires: John Arnold and Fred Price
Player of the match: David Mordaunt (Berks)

- Match was scheduled for one day but extended to two.

28 April 1965
Scorecard

| Derbyshire; 195/8 (60 overs) | v | Essex; 100 (41.2 overs) |
| Michael Page 83; Barry Knight 5/41 (13 overs) | | Keith Fletcher 23; Harold Rhodes 3/16 (11 overs) |

Derbyshire won by 95 runs
Old County Ground, Brentwood
Umpires: Laurie Gray and Ron Lay
Player of the match: Ian Buxton (Derbys)

28–29 April 1965
Scorecard

| Cambridgeshire; 86 (49.2 overs) | v | Warwickshire; 87/0 (22.5 overs) |
| Rex Gautrey 22; Jack Bannister 3/14 (13 overs) | | Bob Barber 54 |

Warwickshire won by 10 wickets
Edgbaston, Birmingham
Umpires: Syd Buller and Hugo Yarnold
Player of the match: Bob Barber (Warks)

- Match extended into a second day

1, 3 May 1965
Scorecard

| Hampshire; 295/7 (60 overs) | v | Norfolk; 147 (57.1 overs) |
| Peter Sainsbury 76; David Pilch 3/44 (8 overs) | | Henry Blofeld 60; Peter Sainsbury 7/30 (13) |

Hampshire won by 148 runs
County Ground, Southampton
Umpires: Jack Crapp and David Smith
Player of the match: Peter Sainsbury (Hants)

- Match was scheduled for one day but extended to two.

1 May 1965
Scorecard

| Wiltshire; 156/9 (60 overs) | v | Nottinghamshire; 157/3 (56.1 overs) |
| Ian Lomax 50; Andrew Corran 4/35 (13 overs) | | Barrie Whittingham 69; James Merryweather 2/23 (13 overs) |

Nottinghamshire won by 7 wickets
Trent Bridge, Nottingham
Umpires: Bill Copson and Eddie Phillipson
Player of the match: Andrew Corran (Notts)

== Second round ==
22 May 1965
Scorecard

| Gloucestershire; 130 (37.5 overs) | v | Northamptonshire; 131/8 (59.2 overs) |
| Arthur Milton 53; David Larter 4/38 (11.5 overs) | | Roger Prideaux 28; Tony Windows 3/28 (13 overs) |

Northamptonshire won by 2 wickets
County Ground, Bristol
Umpires: Paul Gibb and Cec Pepper
Player of the match: Arthur Milton (Glos)

22 May 1965
Scorecard

| Hampshire; 208 (57.4 overs) | v | Kent; 185 (54.1 overs) |
| Peter Sainsbury 70; Alan Dixon 4/51 (13 overs) | | Mike Denness 43; Bob Cottam 3/30 (13 overs) |

Hampshire won by 23 runs
United Services Recreation Ground, Portsmouth
Umpires: Arthur Fagg and John Langridge
Player of the match: Peter Sainsbury (Hants)

22 May 1965
Scorecard

| Leicestershire; 168 (49.4 overs) | v | Yorkshire; 170/4 (53.2 overs) |
| Clive Inman 66; Richard Hutton 3/50 (10 overs) | | Geoffrey Boycott 69; Graham Cross 2/37 (13 overs) |

Yorkshire won by 6 wickets
Grace Road, Leicester
Umpires: Bill Copson and Dusty Rhodes
Player of the match: Clive Inman (Leics)

22 May 1965
Scorecard

| Middlesex; 161 (57.3 overs) | v | Derbyshire; 151/8 (60 overs) |
| Fred Titmus 40; Albert Jackson 2/19 (13 overs) | | Bob Taylor 53*; Don Bennett 4/27 (13 overs) |

Middlesex won by 10 runs
Lord's, London
Umpires: John Arnold and Lofty Herman
Player of the match: Bob Taylor (Derbys)

22 May 1965
Scorecard

| Nottinghamshire; 162 (59.5 overs) | v | Somerset; 166/7 (50.1 overs) |
| Brian Bolus 79; Brian Langford 3/17 (7.5 overs) | | Roy Virgin 78*; Carlton Forbes 2/37 (13 overs) |

Somerset won by 3 wickets
County Ground, Taunton
Umpires: Jack Crapp and Laurie Gray
Player of the match: Roy Virgin (Somst)

22 May 1965
Scorecard

| Glamorgan; 146 (45.1 overs) | v | Surrey; 147/5 (52 overs) |
| Tony Lewis 47; Geoff Arnold 4/26 (11.1 overs) | | John Edrich 65; Don Shepherd 2/40 (12 overs) |

Surrey won by 5 wickets
The Oval, London
Umpires: Sam Cook and Ron Lay
Player of the match: John Edrich (Surrey)

22 May 1965
Scorecard

| Lancashire; 166 (50.1 overs) | v | Warwickshire; 170/4 (51.2 overs) |
| John Sullivan 39; Roger Edmonds 4/33 (8 overs) | | Khalid Ibadulla 58; Ken Higgs 1/38 (13 overs) |

Warwickshire won by 6 wickets
Edgbaston, Birmingham
Umpires: Arthur Jepson and Fred Price
Player of the match: Khalid Ibadulla (Warks)

22 May 1965
Scorecard

| Sussex; 206 (52.4 overs) | v | Worcestershire; 148 (47.3 overs) |
| Ken Suttle 67; Jack Flavell 4/40 (10.4 overs) | | Tom Graveney 40; Tony Buss 4/32 (10.3 overs) |

Sussex won by 58 runs
New Road, Worcester
Umpires: Charlie Elliott and Fred Gardner
Player of the match: Ken Suttle (Sussex)

== Quarter-finals ==
23 June 1965
Scorecard

| Middlesex; 280/8 (60 overs) | v | Sussex; 190 (53 overs) |
| Bob Gale 74; Ian Thomson 2/49 (13 overs) | | Ken Suttle 47; Don Bennett 4/42 (13 overs) |

Middlesex won by 90 runs
Lord's, London
Umpires: Sam Cook and Eddie Phillipson
Player of the match: John Murray (Middx)

23 June 1965
Scorecard

| Somerset; 63 (34.2 overs) | v | Yorkshire; 64/3 (31.5 overs) |
| Mervyn Kitchen 39*; Fred Trueman 6/15 (10.2 overs) | | Geoffrey Boycott 23*; Fred Rumsey 2/12 (13 overs) |

Yorkshire won by 7 wickets
County Ground, Taunton
Umpires: John Arnold and Arthur Fagg
Player of the match: Fred Trueman (Yorks)

23 June 1965
Scorecard

| Surrey; 222/8 (60 overs) | v | Northamptonshire; 97 (38.5 overs) |
| Ron Tindall 73; David Larter 3/50 (13 overs) | | Peter Watts 40; Stewart Storey 4/14 (5.5 overs) |

Surrey won by 125 runs
The Oval, London
Umpires: Charlie Elliott and John Langridge
Player of the match: Ron Tindall (Surrey)

23, 24 June 1965
Scorecard

| Warwickshire; 203 (59.3 overs) | v | Hampshire; 129 (51.2 overs) |
| Khalid Ibadulla 75; Bob Cottam 4/56 (13 overs) | | Mike Barnard 46; Khalid Ibadulla 6/32 (13 overs) |

Warwickshire won by 74 runs
Edgbaston, Birmingham
Umpires: Jack Crapp and Fred Price
Player of the match: Khalid Ibadulla (Warks)

- Match was scheduled for one day but extended to two.

== Semi-finals ==
14 July 1965
Scorecard

| Middlesex; 250/8 (60 overs) | v | Surrey; 252/5 (56.2 overs) |
| Eric Russell 70; Ken Barrington 3/41 (6 overs) | | John Edrich 71; Ted Clark 2/69 (9.2 overs) |

Surrey won by 5 wickets
The Oval, London
Umpires: Syd Buller and Arthur Jepson
Player of the match: Michael Edwards (Surrey)

14, 15, 16 July 1965
Scorecard

| Yorkshire; 177 (59 overs) | v | Warwickshire; 157 (57 overs) |
| Ray Illingworth 45; Tom Cartwright 3/29 (13 overs) | | Alan Smith 39; Donald Wilson 2/15 (13 overs) |

Yorkshire won by 20 runs
Edgbaston, Birmingham
Umpires: Sam Cook and Buddy Oldfield
Player of the match: Ray Illingworth (Yorks)

- Match was scheduled for one day but extended to three.

== Final ==
4 September 1965
Scorecard

| Yorkshire; 317/4 (60 overs) | v | Surrey; 142 (40.4 overs) |
| Geoffrey Boycott 146; Geoff Arnold 1/51 (13 overs) | | Ron Tindall 57; Ray Illingworth 5/29 (11.4 overs) |

Yorkshire won by 175 runs
Lord's, London
Umpires: Syd Buller and Charlie Elliott
Player of the match: Geoffrey Boycott (Yorks)
