= 1970 Gillette Cup =

- Administrator: Test and County Cricket Board
- Cricket format: Limited overs cricket (60 overs per innings)
- Tournament format: Knockout
- Champions: Lancashire (1st title)
- Participants: 22
- Matches: 21
- Most runs: 220 – Roy Virgin (Somerset)
- Most wickets: 13 – Bob Willis (Surrey)

The 1970 Gillette Cup was the eighth Gillette Cup, an English limited overs county cricket tournament. It was held between 25 April and 5 September 1970. The tournament was won by Lancashire County Cricket Club who defeated Sussex County Cricket Club by 6 wickets in the final at Lord's.

== Format ==
The 17 first-class counties were joined by five Minor Counties: Bedfordshire, Buckinghamshire, Cornwall, Norfolk and Oxfordshire. Teams who won in the first round progressed to the second round. The winners in the second round then progressed to the quarter-final stage. Winners from the quarter-finals then progressed to the semi-finals from which the winners then went on to the final at Lord's which was held on 5 September 1970.

== First round ==
25 April 1970
Scorecard

| Glamorgan; 171/7 (60 overs) | v | Cornwall; 99 (55 overs) |
| Peter Walker 51*; Keith Davis 2/30 (12 overs) | | Malcolm Dunstan 28; Peter Walker 5/21 (10 overs) |

Glamorgan won by 72 runs
Boscawen Park, Truro
Umpires: Bill Alley and Alan Whitehead
Player of the match: Peter Walker (Glam)

25, 27, 28 April 1970
Scorecard

| Middlesex; 264/5 (60 overs) | v | Norfolk; 117 (49.5 overs) |
| Eric Russell 80; Tracey Moore 2/41 (12 overs) | | Bill Edrich 36; Keith Jones 3/49 (12 overs) |

Middlesex won by 147 runs
Lord's, London
Umpires: Lloyd Budd and Arthur Fagg
Player of the match: John Murray (Middx)

- Match was scheduled for one day but extended to three.

25, 27 April 1970
Scorecard

| Oxfordshire; 99/9 (60 overs) | v | Worcestershire; 101/3 (54.5 overs) |
| Brian Edrich 30; Vanburn Holder 3/14 (12 overs) | | Basil D'Oliveira 32*; Robin Matthews 2/15 (12 overs) |

Worcestershire won by 7 wickets
Morris Motors Sports Ground, Cowley
Umpires: Jack Crapp and Lofty Herman
Player of the match: Basil D'Oliveira (Worcs)

- Match was scheduled for one day but extended to two.

25, 27, 28 April 1970
Scorecard

| Warwickshire; 215/9 (60 overs) | v | Nottinghamshire; 216/5 (53 overs) |
| Mike Smith 50; Harold Rhodes 2/33 (12 overs) | | Garfield Sobers 70*; Eddie Hemmings 2/33 (9 overs) |

Nottinghamshire won by 5 wickets
Edgbaston, Birmingham
Umpires: Charlie Elliott and Hugo Yarnold
Player of the match: Garfield Sobers (Notts)

- Match was scheduled for one day but extended to three.

25, 26, 27 April 1970
Scorecard

| Surrey; 134/8 (60 overs) | v | Yorkshire; 76 (29.4 overs) |
| Younis Ahmed 31; Brian Close 3/27 (12 overs) | | Richard Hutton 16; Robin Jackman 7/33 (12 overs) |

Surrey won by 58 runs
St George's Road, Harrogate
Umpires: Ron Aspinall and Cec Pepper
Player of the match: Robin Jackman (Surrey)

- Match was scheduled for one day but extended to three.

9 May 1970
Scorecard

| Bedfordshire; 102 (43.1 overs) | v | Buckinghamshire; 105/2 (41 overs) |
| Malcolm Wynn 35; Christopher Pickett 4/20 (12 overs) | | John Turner 56; Trevor Morley 2/13 (11 overs) |

Buckinghamshire won by 8 wickets
London Road, High Wycombe
Umpires: Laurie Gray and John Langridge
Player of the match: Christopher Pickett (Bucks)

== Second round ==
30 May 1970
Scorecard

| Hampshire; 278/3 (60 overs) | v | Buckinghamshire; 136 (58.1 overs) |
| Barry Reed 143*; Christopher Parry 3/61 (12 overs) | | Ronald Hooker 65; John Holder 2/10 (11 overs) |

Hampshire won by 142 runs
Amy Lane, Chesham
Umpires: John Arnold and George Pope
Player of the match: Barry Reed (Hants)

30 May 1970
Scorecard

| Essex; 174/9 (60 overs) | v | Sussex; 175/6 (58.4 overs) |
| Brian Edmeades 40; Mike Buss 2/25 (12 overs) | | Mike Buss 72; Stuart Turner 2/31 (11 overs) |

Sussex won by 4 wickets
County Ground, Chelmsford
Umpires: Arthur Fagg and Dusty Rhodes
Player of the match: Mike Buss (Sussex)

30 May 1970
Scorecard

| Glamorgan; 149 (58.1 overs) | v | Surrey; 151/3 (49.2 overs) |
| Alan Jones 52; Stewart Storey 3/13 (12 overs) | | John Edrich 66*; Malcolm Nash 1/34 (12 overs) |

Surrey won by 7 wickets
St. Helen's, Swansea
Umpires: Bill Alley and Peter Wight
Player of the match: Stewart Storey (Surrey)

30 May 1970
Scorecard

| Lancashire; 278/8 (60 overs) | v | Gloucestershire; 251 (58.1 overs) |
| David Lloyd 62; Tony Brown 4/56 (12 overs) | | Ron Nicholls 75; Jack Simmons 3/39 (12 overs) |

Lancashire won by 27 runs
Ashley Down Ground, Bristol
Umpires: Eddie Phillipson and Hugo Yarnold
Player of the match: Ron Nicholls (Glos)

30 May 1970
Scorecard

| Kent; 297/3 (60 overs) | v | Worcestershire; 228 (56.1 overs) |
| Brian Luckhurst 96; Norman Gifford 1/46 (10 overs) | | Rodney Cass 43; Alan Brown 3/31 (11.1 overs) |

Kent won by 69 runs
St Lawrence Ground, Canterbury
Umpires: Lofty Herman and Tom Spencer
Player of the match: Brian Luckhurst (Kent)

30 May 1970
Scorecard

| Nottinghamshire; 216/5 (60 overs) | v | Leicestershire; 173 (53.5 overs) |
| Brian Bolus 75*; Jack Birkenshaw 2/31 (12 overs) | | Ray Illingworth 59; Mike Taylor 4/32 (10.5 overs) |

Nottinghamshire won by 43 runs
Grace Road, Leicester
Umpires: Freddie Jakeman and Cec Pepper
Player of the match: Brian Bolus (Notts)

30 May 1970
Scorecard

| Derbyshire; 161/9 (60 overs) | v | Middlesex; 162/8 (53.4 overs) |
| John Harvey 34; Fred Titmus 5/26 (12 overs) | | Eric Russell 54; Fred Rumsey 3/15 (12 overs) |

Middlesex won by 2 wickets
Lord's, London
Umpires: Laurie Gray and John Langridge
Player of the match: Fred Titmus (Middx)

30 May 1970
Scorecard

| Somerset; 248/6 (60 overs) | v | Northamptonshire; 198 (59.2 overs) |
| Roy Virgin 103; Brian Crump 3/43 (12 overs) | | David Steele 58; Allan Jones 5/56 (12 overs) |

Somerset won by 50 runs
County Ground, Northampton
Umpires: Charlie Elliott and Harry Mellows
Player of the match: Roy Virgin (Somst)

== Quarter-finals ==
8 July 1970
Scorecard

| Sussex; 199 (60 overs) | v | Kent; 152 (56.5 overs) |
| Geoff Greenidge 56; Bob Woolmer 3/26 (9 overs) | | Brian Luckhurst 48; Tony Greig 5/42 (10.5 overs) |

Sussex won by 47 wickets
St Lawrence Ground, Canterbury
Umpires: Lloyd Budd and Arthur Jepson
Player of the match: Tony Greig (Sussex)

8 July 1970
Scorecard

| Hampshire; 142 (50.4 overs) | v | Lancashire; 143/5 (35.3 overs) |
| Roy Marshall 43; Peter Lever 5/30 (12 overs) | | Barry Wood 63*; Butch White 2/35 (8 overs) |

Lancashire won by 5 wickets
Old Trafford, Manchester
Umpires: Ron Aspinall and Dickie Bird
Player of the match: Barry Wood (Lancs)

8, 9 July 1970
Scorecard

| Nottinghamshire; 232/5 (60 overs) | v | Somerset; 233/5 (58 overs) |
| Pasty Harris 101; Tom Cartwright 1/22 (12 overs) | | Peter Robinson 57; David Halfyard 3/47 (12 overs) |

Somerset won by 5 wickets
Trent Bridge, Nottingham
Umpires: David Constant and Tom Spencer
Player of the match: Graham Burgess (Somst)

- Match was scheduled for one day but extended to two.

8 July 1970
Scorecard

| Surrey; 280/5 (60 overs) | v | Middlesex; 272/9 (60 overs) |
| John Edrich 91; John Price 3/63 (12 overs) | | Peter Parfitt 44; Bob Willis 6/49 (12 overs) |

Surrey won by 8 runs
The Oval, London
Umpires: John Arnold and Harry Mellows
Player of the match: Bob Willis (Surrey)

== Semi-finals ==
22 July 1970
Scorecard

| Somerset; 207 (58.2 overs) | v | Lancashire; 210/6 (56.2 overs) |
| Roy Virgin 65; Barry Wood 3/35 (12 overs) | | John Sullivan 50; Brian Langford 2/43 (12 overs) |

Lancashire won by 4 wickets
County Ground, Taunton
Umpires: Syd Buller and Jack Crapp
Player of the match: Barry Wood (Lancs)

22 July 1970
Scorecard

| Surrey; 196 (59.3 overs) | v | Sussex; 196/8 (50 overs) |
| Mike Edwards 50; John Snow 4/35 (12 overs) | | Peter Graves 45; Intikhab Alam 2/28 (12 overs) |

Sussex won by losing fewer wickets
The Oval, London
Umpires: Arthur Jepson and Peter Wight
Player of the match: John Snow (Sussex)

== Final ==
5 September 1970
Scorecard

| Sussex; 184/9 (60 overs) | v | Lancashire; 185/4 (55.1 overs) |
| Mike Buss 42; David Hughes 3/31 (12 overs) | | Harry Pilling 70*; Mike Buss 2/34 (12 overs) |

Lancashire won by 6 wickets
Lord's, London
Umpires: Charlie Elliott and Arthur Fagg
Player of the match: Harry Pilling (Lancs)
