= Patrick Briggs =

English cricketer & rugby union player

Personal information
- Full name: Patrick David Briggs
- Born: 24 August 1940 (age 86); Timperley, Cheshire, England
- Nickname: PDB
- Batting: Right-handed
- Bowling: Right-arm medium

Domestic team information
- Years: Team
- 1960–1968: Cheshire
- 1963–1964: Cambridge University
- 1969–1973: Bedfordshire

Career statistics
Competition	First-class	List A
Matches	21	4
Runs scored	533	166
Batting average	16.15	41.50
100s/50s	0/2	0/2
Top score	91	69
Balls bowled	12	–
Wickets	0	–
Bowling average	–	–
5 wickets in innings	–	–
10 wickets in match	–	–
Best bowling	–	–
Catches/stumpings	17/–	1/–
- Source: Cricinfo, 4 August 2011

Patrick David Briggs (born 24 August 1940) is an English former cricketer, rugby player and school headmaster.

== Cricket ==
Briggs was a right-handed batsman who bowled right-arm medium pace. He was born in Timperley, Altrincham, Cheshire.

Briggs made his debut in county cricket for Cheshire against Staffordshire in the 1960 Minor Counties Championship. He played for Cheshire for a few seasons, before attending Cambridge University, where he made his first-class debut for Cambridge University Cricket Club against Yorkshire in 1963. He made 20 further first-class appearances for the university, the last of which came against the Marylebone Cricket Club in 1964. In his 21 first-class matches, he scored 533 runs at an average of 16.15, with a high score of 91. This score, one of two fifties he made for the university, came against Essex in 1963. After finishing his studies, Briggs continued to play Minor counties cricket for Cheshire until 1968, making a total of 27 Minor Counties Championship appearances. He also made 2 List A appearances for Cheshire. The first of these came against Norfolk in the 1st round of the 1968 Gillette Cup, with Briggs scoring 60 runs before being dismissed by John Shepperd, in a match Bedfordshire won by a single wicket. The second of these came in the 2nd round of the same competition, against Northamptonshire. He scored 16 runs in this match, before being dismissed by Antony Durose, with Northamptonshire winning by 9 wickets.

In 1969, Briggs joined Bedfordshire, making his debut for the county against Shropshire in the Minor Counties Championship. He played Minor counties cricket for Bedfordshire from 1969 to 1973, making 19 Minor Counties Championship appearances. He also made 2 List A appearances for Bedfordshire. The first of these came against Buckinghamshire in the 1970 Gillette Cup, with him scoring 21 runs before being dismissed by Colin Lever, with Buckinghamshire winning by 8 wickets. The second of these came against Essex in the 1971 Gillette Cup. Briggs scored 69 runs in this match, before being run out, with Essex winning the match by 97 runs.

== Rugby ==
Briggs also played Rugby union for Cambridge (thus achieving a "double blue"). Whilst teaching at Bedford School, he played at No.10 for Bedford RUFC and it was during this time he was trialed for the England side along with his two Bedford centres, Geoff Frankom and Danny Hearn. Later he played for the Barbarians and a RFU staff coach 1973–95, England under-23 rugby coach 1975–80, and manager of the England students rugby team 1988–95.

== Schoolmaster ==
Briggs taught at Bedford School 1965–87 (housemaster 1977–87), then moved to be headmaster of William Hulme's Grammar School 1987–97. He was principal of Kolej Tuanku Ja'afar in Negri Sembilan, Malaysia 1997–2005.
