= Donald Smith (cricketer, born 1933) =

English cricketer

Personal information
- Full name: Donald Joseph Smith
- Born: 19 October 1933; Stockport, Cheshire, England
- Died: 7 April 2015 (aged 81); Sutton, Macclesfield, Cheshire, England
- Batting: Left-handed
- Bowling: Right-arm fast-medium

Domestic team information
- Years: Team
- 1967–1971: Cheshire
- 1965: Cornwall
- 1955–1957: Cambridge University
- 1952–1963: Cheshire

Career statistics
Competition	First-class	List A
Matches	28	2
Runs scored	128	1
Batting average	8.00	0.50
100s/50s	–/–	–/–
Top score	18*	1
Balls bowled	4,873	132
Wickets	73	1
Bowling average	31.46	72.00
5 wickets in innings	2	–
10 wickets in match	–	–
Best bowling	7/55	1/44
Catches/stumpings	6/–	1/–
- Source: Cricinfo, 11 August 2011

Donald Joseph Smith (19 October 1933 – 7 April 2015) was an English cricketer. Smith was a right-handed batsman who bowled left-arm fast-medium. He was born in Stockport, Cheshire.

Smith made his debut in county cricket for Cheshire in the 1952 Minor Counties Championship against the Yorkshire Second XI. In 1955, he made his first-class debut for Cambridge University against Surrey in 1955. He made 27 further first-class appearances for the university, the last of which came against Surrey in 1957. In his 28 first-class matches for the university, he took 73 wickets at an average of 31.46, with best figures of 7/55. These figures, one of two five-wicket hauls he took, came against Gloucestershire in 1955. With the bat, he scored 128 runs at a batting average of 8.00, with a high score of 18 not out.

During and after his studies at Cambridge, Smith continued to play Minor counties cricket for Cheshire, who he appeared for until 1971, making a total of 57 Minor Counties Championship appearances. He also played List A cricket for Cheshire, making his debut in that format against Norfolk in the 1st round of the 1968 Gillette Cup. In this match, he took the wicket of Graham Saville in Norfolk's innings, for the cost of 44 runs from 12 overs, while with the bat he was dismissed for a single run by Bill Edrich. With Cheshire victorious in this match, he made his second and final List A appearance against Northamptonshire in the following round. In this match, he was dismissed for a duck by Antony Durose, while with the ball he bowled 10 wicket-less overs, with Northamptonshire winning the match by 9 wickets.
