= Robin Matthews (cricketer) =

English cricketer

Personal information
- Full name: Robin Birkby Matthews
- Born: 30 January 1944; Stockton-on-Tees, County Durham, England
- Died: 13 March 2025 (aged 81)
- Batting: Right-handed
- Bowling: Right-arm medium

Domestic team information
- Years: Team
- 1964–1970: Oxfordshire
- 1971–1973: Leicestershire

Career statistics
Competition	First-class	List A
Matches	25	9
Runs scored	89	1
Batting average	8.90	–
100s/50s	0/0	0/0
Top score	16*	1*
Balls bowled	2,465	451
Wickets	48	11
Bowling average	27.87	27.72
5 wickets in innings	1	0
10 wickets in match	0	0
Best bowling	7/51	3/40
Catches/stumpings	8/–	12/–
- Source: Cricinfo, 26 March 2025

Robin Birkby Matthews (30 January 1944 – 13 March 2025) was an English cricketer. Matthews was a right-handed batsman who bowled right-arm medium pace. He was born in Stockton-on-Tees, County Durham.

Matthews made his debut for Oxfordshire against Berkshire in the 1964 Minor Counties Championship. He played Minor counties cricket for Oxfordshire from 1964 to 1969, making 18 Minor Counties Championship appearances. He made his List A debut against Cambridgeshire in the 1967 Gillette Cup. In this match, he wasn't required to bat, while with the ball he took the wickets of Peter Shippey and Rex Gautrey for the cost of 29 runs from 8.1 overs. He made a further List A appearance for Oxfordshire, against Worcestershire in the 1970 Gillette Cup. In this match, he was dismissed for a duck by Vanburn Holder, while with the ball he took the wickets of Ron Headley and Alan Ormrod, taking figures of 2/15 from 12 overs.

Matthews later joined Leicestershire, making his first-class debut against the touring Indians at Grace Road. He made 24 further first-class appearances for Leicestershire, the last of which came against Kent in 1973 County Championship. In his 25 first-class matches, he took 48 wickets at an average of 27.87, with best figures of 7/51. These figures, his only five wicket haul, came against Sussex in the 1972 County Championship. With the bat, he scored 89 runs at a batting average of 8.90, with a high score of 16 not out. He made his List A debut for the county against Middlesex in the 1971 John Player League. He made 6 further List A appearances for Leicestershire, the last of which came against Surrey in the 1973 John Player League. In his 7 List A matches for the team, he took 7 wickets at an average of 37.28, with best figures of 3/40.

Matthews died at the age of 81. His death was announced on 19 March 2025.
