= Macclesfield Cricket Club Ground =

Cricket ground in England

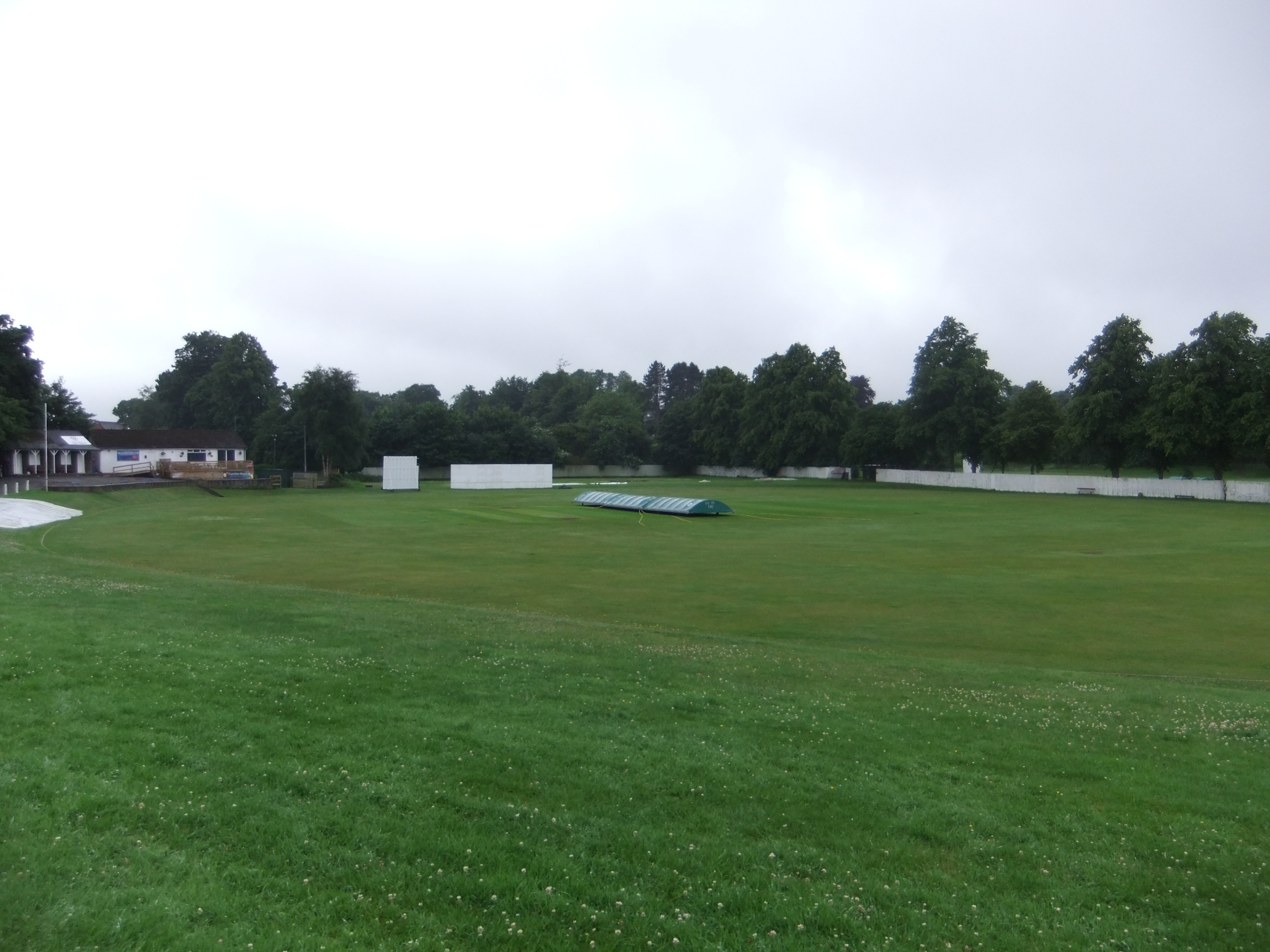
- Interactive map of Macclesfield Cricket Club Ground

Ground information
- Location: Macclesfield, Cheshire
- Country: England
- Coordinates: 53.2625°N 2.1457°W
- Establishment: 1920 (first recorded match)

Team information
Minor Counties North	(1974)
Cheshire	(1920–1984)
- As of 10 July 2012; Source: Ground profile

Macclesfield Cricket Club Ground is a cricket ground in Victoria Road, Macclesfield, Cheshire, England. A small ground, it is bordered to the east by Macclesfield District General Hospital and to the south and west by housing. The ground is used by Macclesfield Cricket Club. Field hockey and lawn bowls are also played at the ground.

== History ==
Macclesfield Cricket Club has been in existence for over 180 years, though where the club originally played is unknown. The first recorded match on the current ground came in Cheshire's first match there in the 1921 Minor Counties Championship against Staffordshire. Cheshire played an annual Minor Counties Championship at the ground until 1931. Minor counties cricket did not return to the ground until 1949, when Cheshire played the Worcestershire Second XI in the Minor Counties Championship. Cheshire played annually at the ground throughout the 1950s and 1960s. It was in the 1966 Gillette Cup that the ground held its first List A match when Cheshire played first-class opponents in the form of Lancashire. Two further List A matches were held there in the 1968 Gillette Cup, with Cheshire defeating Norfolk in a first round match, but losing to Northamptonshire in the second round. A final List A match was held there in 1974, when the ground was selected as a home venue for Minor Counties North in the Benson & Hedges Cup, with Lancashire as the visitors. The ground continued to host Minor Counties Championship matches during the 1970s, with the final Minor Counties Championship match held in 1982. In 1983, the ground held the first final of the MCCA Knockout Trophy, which saw Cheshire triumph over Bedfordshire. A second MCCA Knockout Trophy match was held in 1984, with Hertfordshire as the visitors. This was the last time the ground was used by Cheshire.

In latter years, the ground has had to contend with deteriorating facilities. In 2003, plans were drawn up for Macclesfield Cricket Club to sell the ground for development and move to a new ground along London Road. However these plans failed to come to fruition. In 2011, plans were drawn up to transform the ground into one of the leading leisure facilities in Cheshire, with the undertaking of an £800,000 redevelopment project.

== Records ==
=== List A ===
- Highest team total: 212/9 (59.4 overs) by Cheshire v Norfolk, 1968
- Lowest team total: 62 all out (45.3 overs) by Cheshire v Lancashire, 1966
- Highest individual innings: 73 by Graham Saville for Norfolk v Cheshire, 1968
- Best bowling in an innings: 4/10 by Ken Higgs for Lancashire v Cheshire, 1966

== Gallery ==
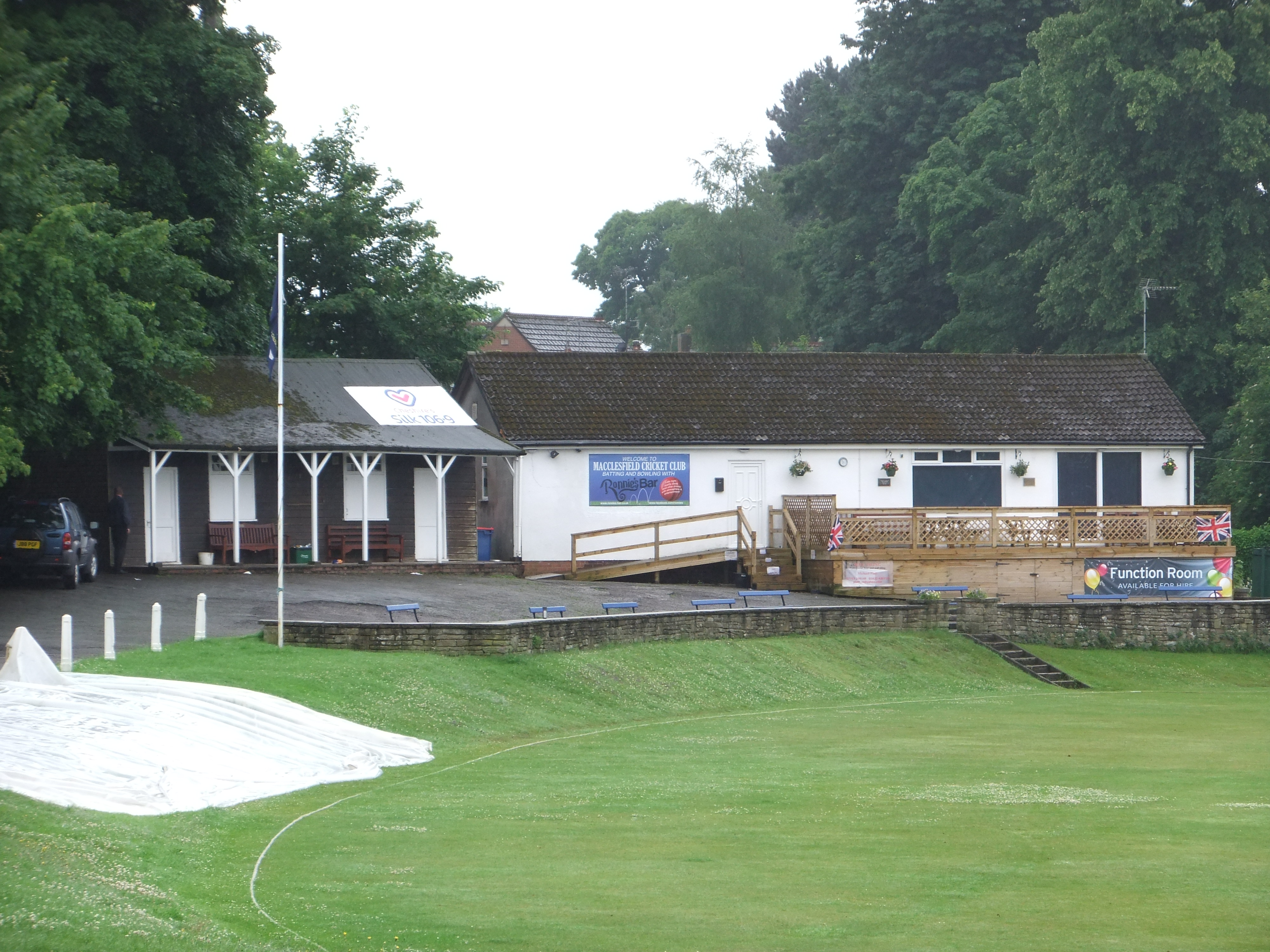
View of the pavilion.

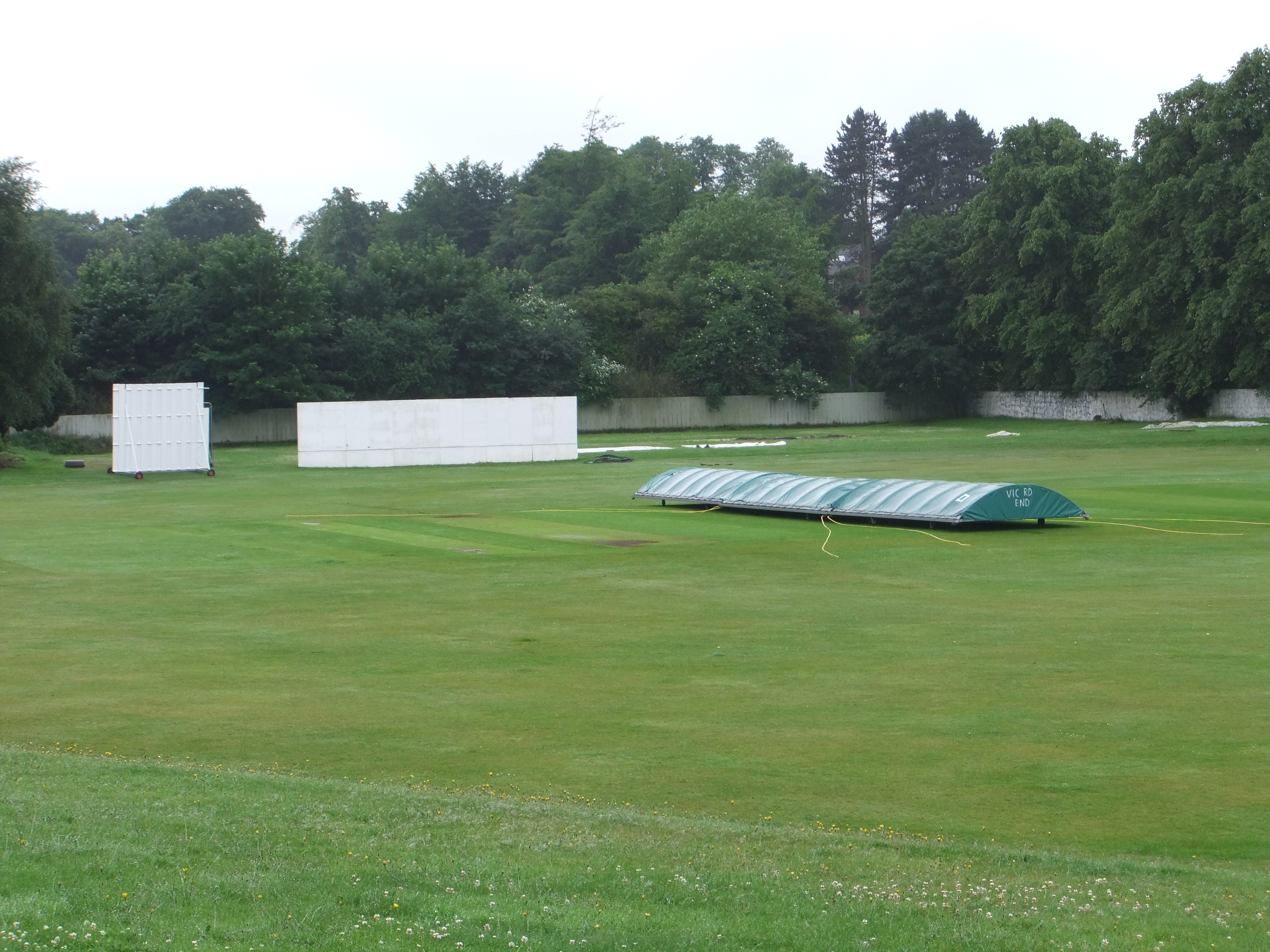
Wider view of the ground.

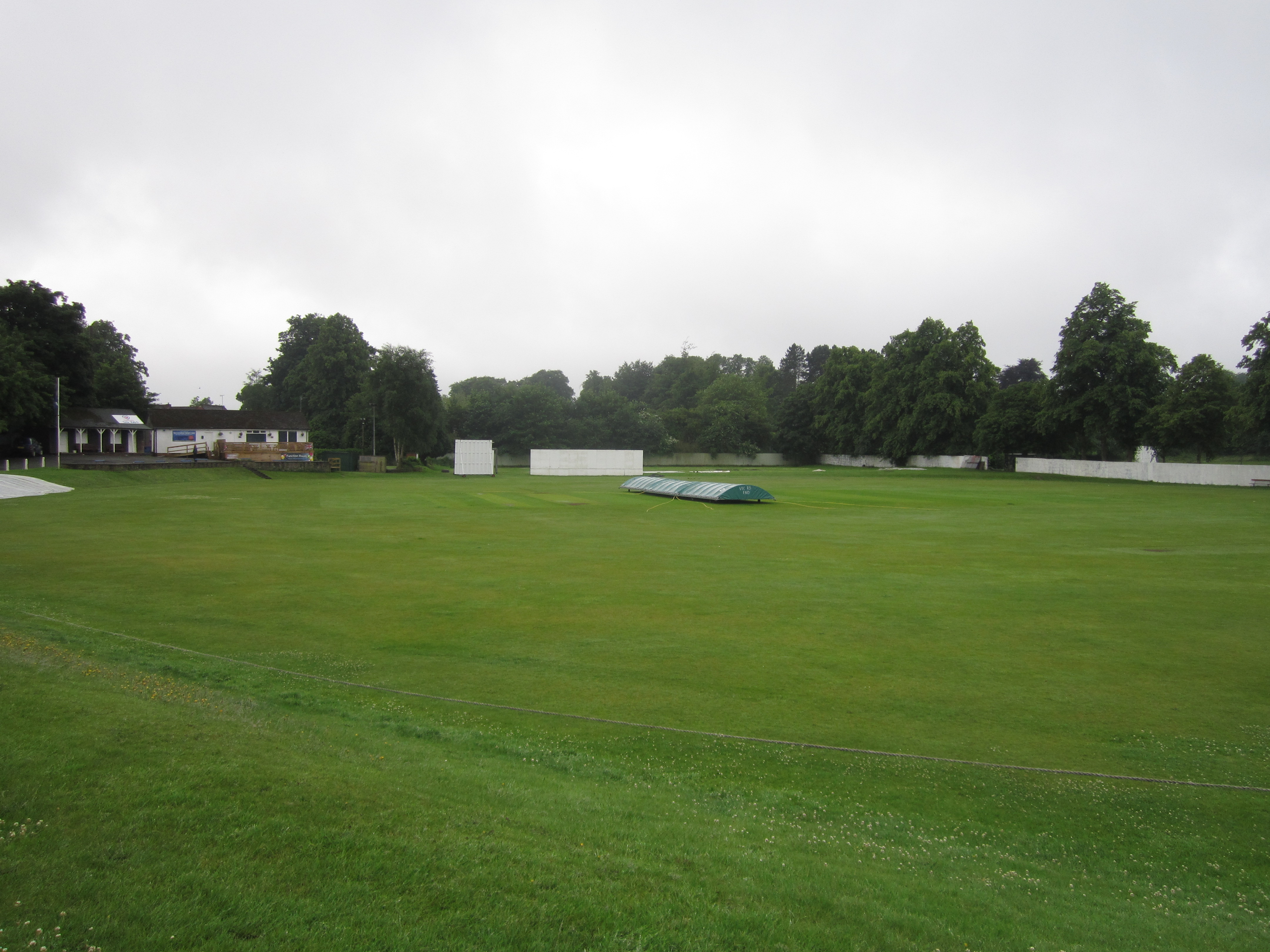
View of the ground toward the pavilion.

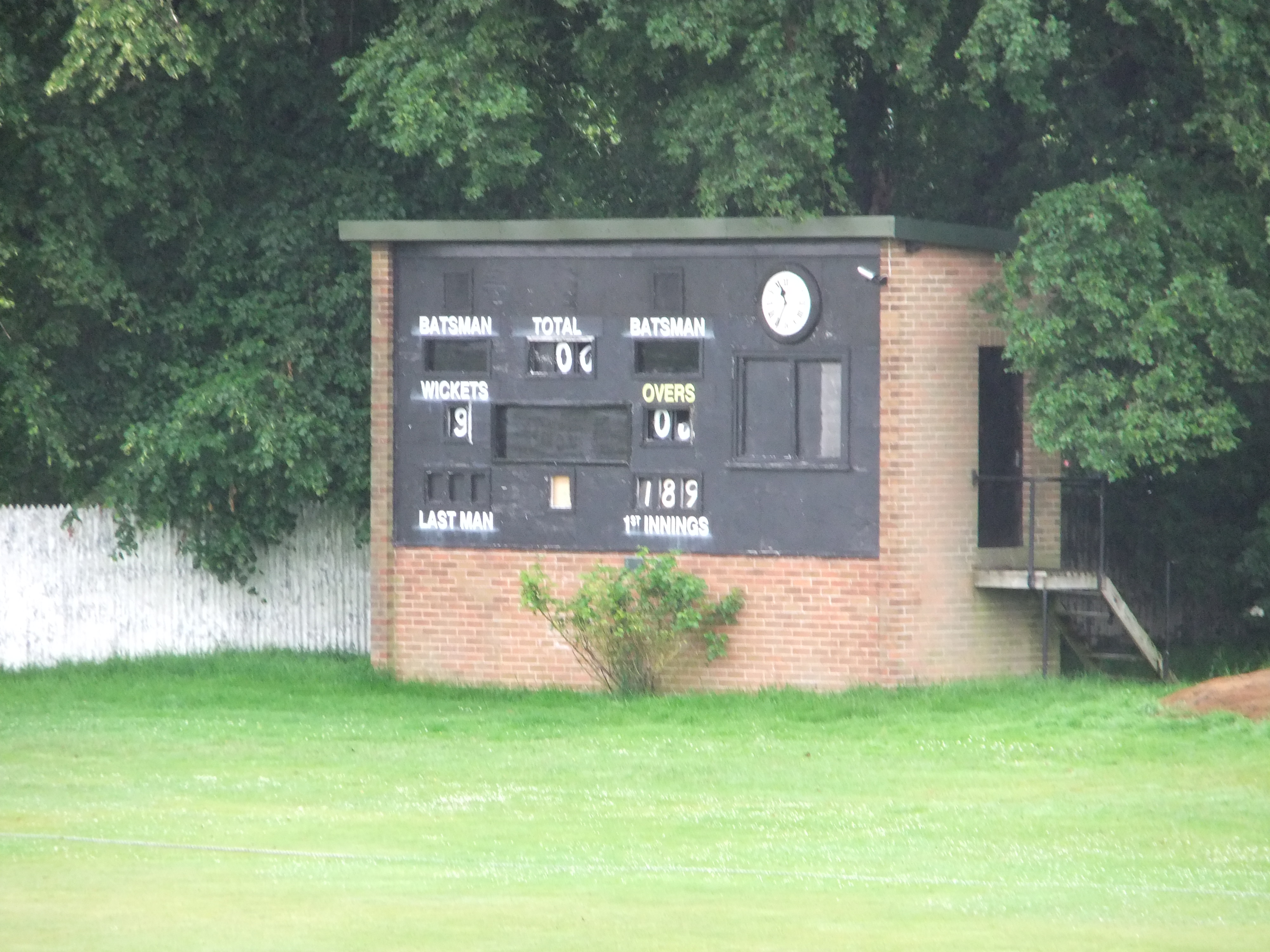
View of the scorers hut.

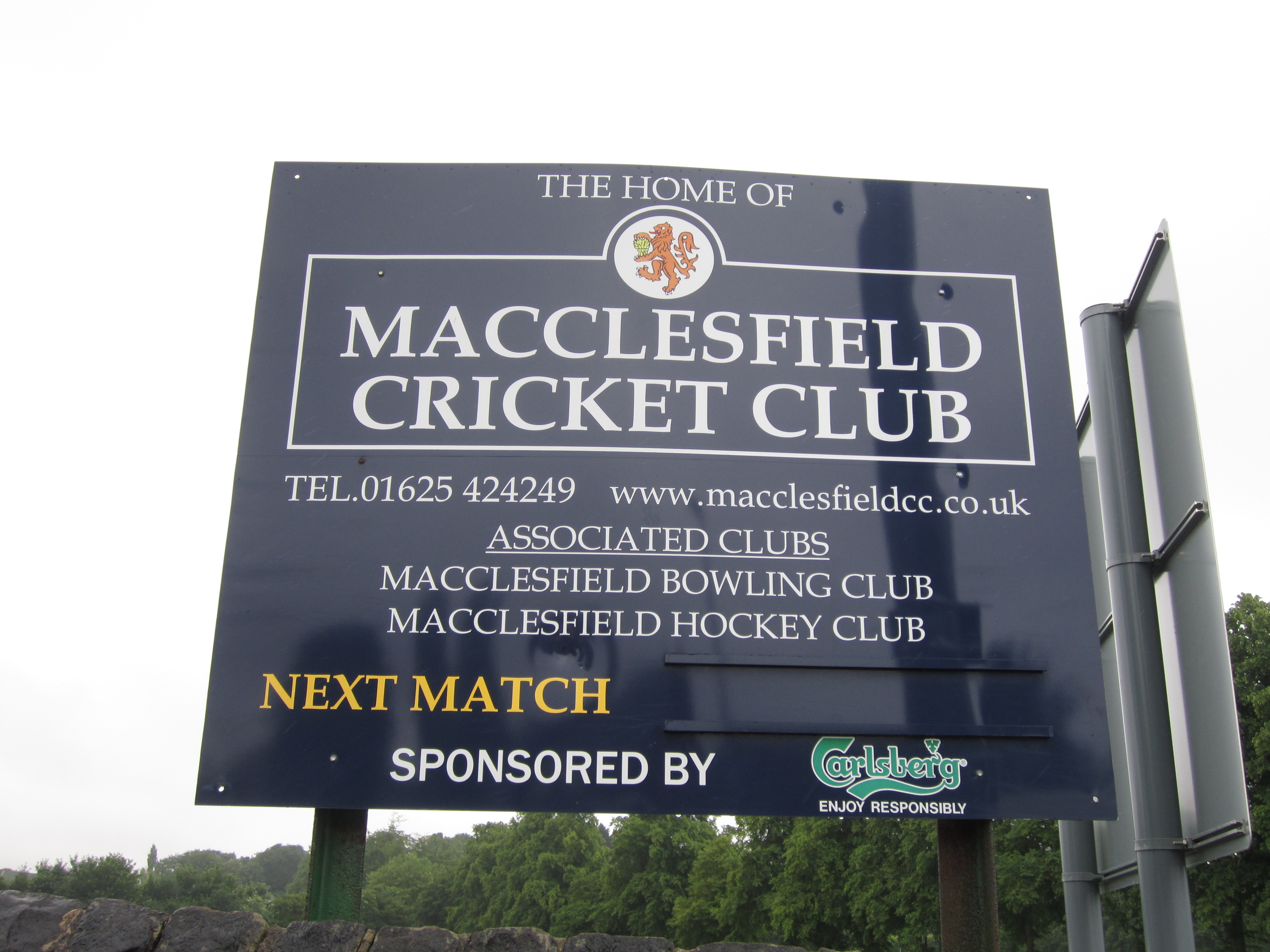
Welcome sign at the ground.

== See also ==
- List of cricket grounds in England and Wales
