= Frederick Baines =

Frederick or Fred Baines may refer to:

- Frederick Ebenezer Baines (1832–1911), English post office employee
- Fred Baines (1898–?) English footballer (Leeds City, Rochdale); see List of Rochdale A.F.C. players (25–99 appearances)
- Frederick Baines (cricketer) (born 1941), English cricketer
