= Peshawar Club Ground =

Cricket ground in Peshawar, Pakistan

The Peshawar Club Ground is a cricket ground in Peshawar, Pakistan, used for one Test match between India and Pakistan in February 1955. It staged first class cricket matches from 1938 to 1987.

== History of matches ==
The history of first-class cricket at the Peshawar Club Ground began with the North West Frontier Province in the Indian Ranji Trophy. After the creation of Pakistan, the NWFP team was admitted in 1949 into the Quaid-e-Azam Trophy, and again played at Peshawar until they were replaced in the Trophy by a Peshawar city team in 1956. Before that, in February 1955, Pakistan had entertained India for the only Test match to be played here. In a drawn four-day encounter, Polly Umrigar hit a century for India before he was run out.

The following year, New Zealand played a Governor-General of Pakistan's XI here, while a full-strength Pakistan side beat a non-Test touring team from Marylebone Cricket Club. For Quaid-e-Azam Trophy matches, the Peshawar team switched between this ground and the Peshawar Gymkhana Ground until 1971. In 1957, Peshawar off spinner Haseeb Ahsan achieved the best figures on the ground with 13 for 47 in a match against Punjab B.

Touring teams occasionally visited the ground, though no more Test matches were played. In 1967, an MCC Under-25 side played a Pakistan North Zone team, a match which is notable for Mike Brearley's highest first class score. The visitors' captain made 312 not out in a day as MCC piled up 514 for four against opposition including the later Test captain Intikhab Alam, declared, then won by an innings and 139 runs on the third day. He shared double century stands with Alan Knott and Alan Ormrod (records for the first and fifth wickets at the ground), and his innings remains the highest on the ground, despite Zakir Butt's 290 for Pakistan Railways six years later. Brearley was dropped several times after reaching his double-century and there appears to have been some suggestion that at some stage the scorers may have got Brearley and his batting partner Ormrod mixed up.

Matches by touring teams became more common in the 1970s, with England, India, New Zealand, Sri Lanka (then not a Test nation) all playing a team at this ground. Most matches were drawn, though England won by the use of two declarations, while New Zealand lost against a team with nine players who would appear in the Test series against them. An International XI captained by Vanburn Holder also beat a near full-strength Pakistan here in 1976 in a 40-over match.

By November 1984, the new Arbab Niaz Stadium in Peshawar was ready, and the Club Ground was disused. It hosted Peshawar for the last time in their 1986–87 Quaid-e-Azam Trophy campaign, where they played eight home matches, and since then the Arbab Niaz has taken over as Peshawar's international and first class ground of choice.

== International centuries ==
A single Test century was scored at the venue.

No.	Score	Player	Team	Balls	Innings	Opposing team	Date	Result
1	116*	Polly Umrigar	India	NA	2	Pakistan	13 February 1955	Drawn

== International five-wicket hauls ==
Two five-wicket hauls in Test matches were taken at the venue.

No.	Bowler	Date	Team	Opposing team	Inn	Overs	Runs	Wkts	Econ	Result
1	Subhash Gupte	13 February 1955	India	Pakistan	1	41.3	63	5	1.51	Drawn
2	Vinoo Mankad	13 February 1955	India	Pakistan	3	54	64	5	1.18	Drawn

== See also ==
- List of Test cricket grounds
- One-Test wonder
- 1938–39 Ranji Trophy
