= Stuart Wood (cricketer) =

English cricketer (born 1939)

Personal information
- Full name: Stuart Leslie Wood
- Born: 27 November 1939 (age 86); Crewe, Cheshire, England
- Batting: Left-handed

Domestic team information
- Years: Team
- 1975: Minor Counties North
- 1965–1979: Cheshire

Career statistics
Competition	List A
Matches	5
Runs scored	88
Batting average	17.60
100s/50s	–/–
Top score	49
Balls bowled	–
Wickets	–
Bowling average	–
5 wickets in innings	–
10 wickets in match	–
Best bowling	–
Catches/stumpings	–/–
- Source: Cricinfo, 5 April 2011

Stuart Leslie Wood (born 27 November 1939) is a former English cricketer. Wood was a left-handed batsman. He was born in Crewe, Cheshire.

Wood made his debut for Cheshire in the 1965 Minor Counties Championship against the Yorkshire Second XI. Wood played Minor counties cricket for Cheshire from 1965 to 1979, which included 109 Minor Counties Championship matches In 1966, he made his List A debut against Lancashire in the Gillette Cup. He played two further List A matches for Cheshire, both of which came in 1968 against Norfolk and Northamptonshire in that seasons Gillette Cup. Several years later in 1975, Wood played his final two List A matches for Minor Counties North in the Benson & Hedges Cup against Yorkshire and Nottinghamshire. In his five career List A matches, he scored 88 runs at a batting average of 17.60, with a high score of 49. His highest List A score came against Northamptonshire in 1968, with his innings being brought to an end by Colin Milburn.

He also played Second XI cricket for the Warwickshire Second XI in 1969.
