= Ian Davison (cricketer) =

English cricketer

Personal information
- Full name: Ian Joseph Davison
- Born: 4 October 1937; Hemel Hempstead, Hertfordshire
- Died: 2 January 2017 (aged 79)
- Batting: Right-handed
- Bowling: Right-arm medium-fast

Domestic team information
- Years: Team
- 1955–1958: Bedfordshire
- 1959–1966: Nottinghamshire
- 1967–1969: Bedfordshire

Career statistics
Competition	First-class	List A
Matches	178	8
Runs scored	1,641	45
Batting average	9.06	15.00
100s/50s	0/3	0/0
Top score	60*	22
Balls bowled	31,810	538
Wickets	541	9
Bowling average	28.81	28.22
5 wickets in innings	22	0
10 wickets in match	2	0
Best bowling	7/28	4/34
Catches/stumpings	91/–	26/–
- Source: Cricinfo, 7 December 2011

Ian Joseph Davison (4 October 1937 – 2 January 2017) was an English cricketer. Davison was a right-handed batsman who bowled right-arm medium-fast. He was born at Hemel Hempstead, Hertfordshire.

After several seasons with Bedfordshire in the Minor Counties competition he played as an opening bowler for Nottinghamshire between 1959 and 1966. His best season was in 1963, when he took 111 wickets at 21.92. In the 1966 season, Wisden records that he "began well as opening partner to Carlton Forbes, but beset in mid-season by injury he faded and eventually lost his place. He has now accepted a business appointment." He was only 28 when he retired from first-class cricket. He played three more seasons with Bedfordshire, then retired from all cricket after the 1969 season.

He died on 2 January 2017 at the age of 79.
