= Gordon Williamson =

Gordon Williamson may refer to:

- John Gordon Williamson (born 1936), cricket player
- Gordon Williamson (military author) (born 1951), military history author
