= Christopher Pickett =

English cricketer

Personal information
- Full name: Christopher Arthur Pickett
- Born: 26 August 1926; Hedgerley, Buckinghamshire, England
- Died: October 1995 (aged 68–69); Buckinghamshire, England
- Batting: Left-handed
- Bowling: Slow left-arm orthodox Left arm fast

Domestic team information
- Years: Team
- 1953: Minor Counties
- 1949–1970: Buckinghamshire

Career statistics
Competition	FC	LA
Matches	1	4
Runs scored	10	10
Batting average	10.00	5.00
100s/50s	–/–	–/–
Top score	7*	5
Balls bowled	78	276
Wickets	–	7
Bowling average	–	22.28
5 wickets in innings	–	–
10 wickets in match	–	–
Best bowling	–	4/20
Catches/stumpings	–/–	3/–
- Source: Cricinfo, 7 May 2011

Christopher Arthur Pickett (26 August 1926 – October 1995) was an English cricketer. Pickett was a left-handed batsman who bowled slow left-arm orthodox as well as left-arm fast. He was born at Hedgerley, Buckinghamshire.

Pickett made his debut for Buckinghamshire in the 1949 Minor Counties Championship against Oxfordshire. Pickett played Minor counties cricket for Buckinghamshire from 1949 to 1970, which included 69 Minor Counties Championship matches. In 1965, he made his List A debut against Middlesex in the Gillette Cup. He made 3 further List A appearances for the county, the last coming against Hampshire in the 1970 Gillette Cup. In his 4 List A matches, he took 7 wickets at a bowling average of 22.28, with best figures of 4/20.

In his career, Pickett also played a single first-class match for a combined Minor Counties cricket team against the touring Australians in 1953. In this match, he scored 7* in the Minor Counties first-innings and in their second-innings he was dismissed for 3 by Richie Benaud. He also bowled 13 wicket-less overs in the match.

He died sometime in October 1995.
