= Amy Lane =

Cricket ground in Chesham, England

Coordinates: 51.69978°N 0.61256°W

- The Meadow
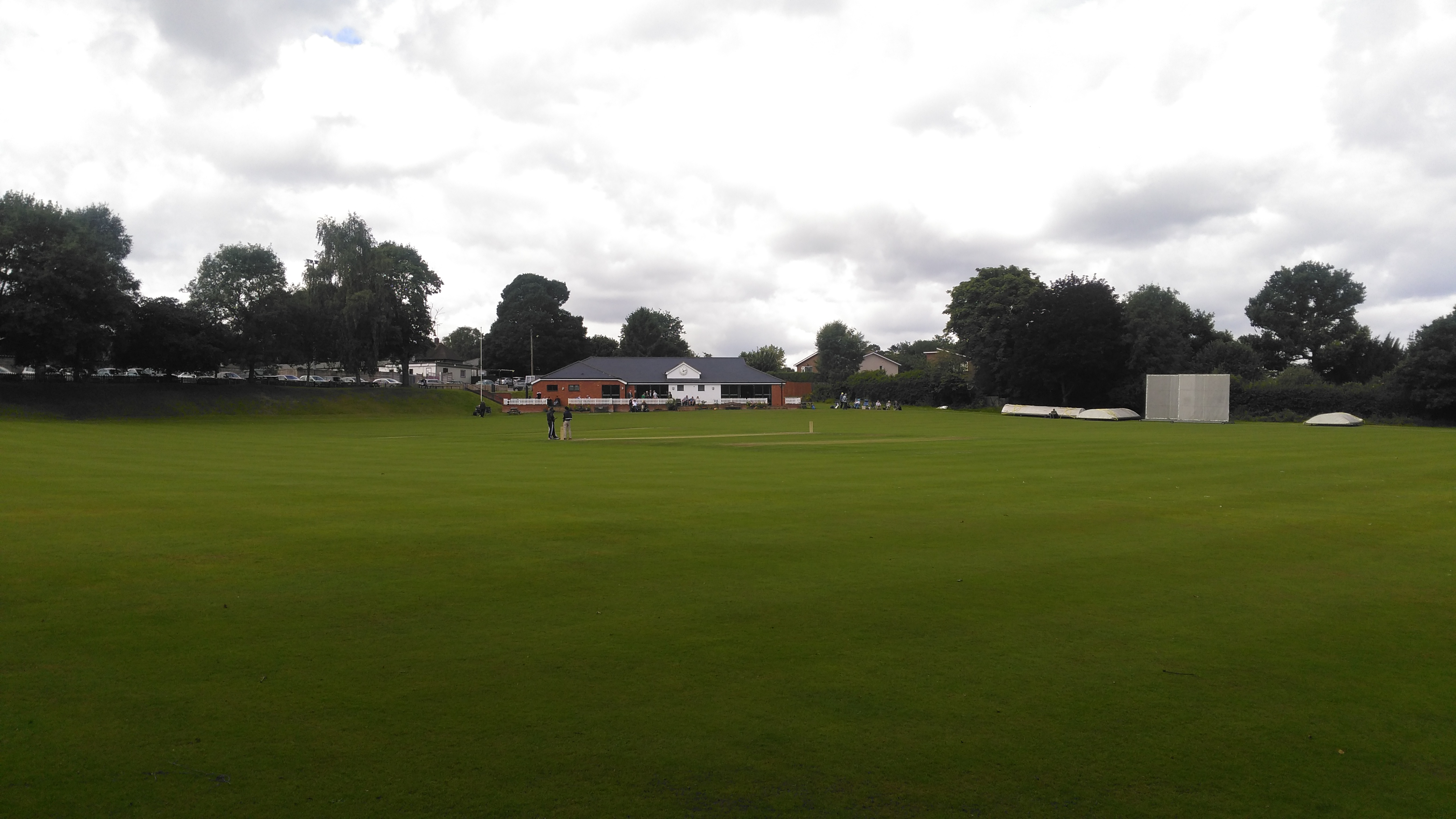

Ground information
- Location: Chesham, Buckinghamshire
- Establishment: 1907 (first recorded match)

Team information
Buckinghamshire	(1907, 1951-1982 & 1993)
Minor Counties East	(1978)
- As of 22 August 2010; Source: Ground profile

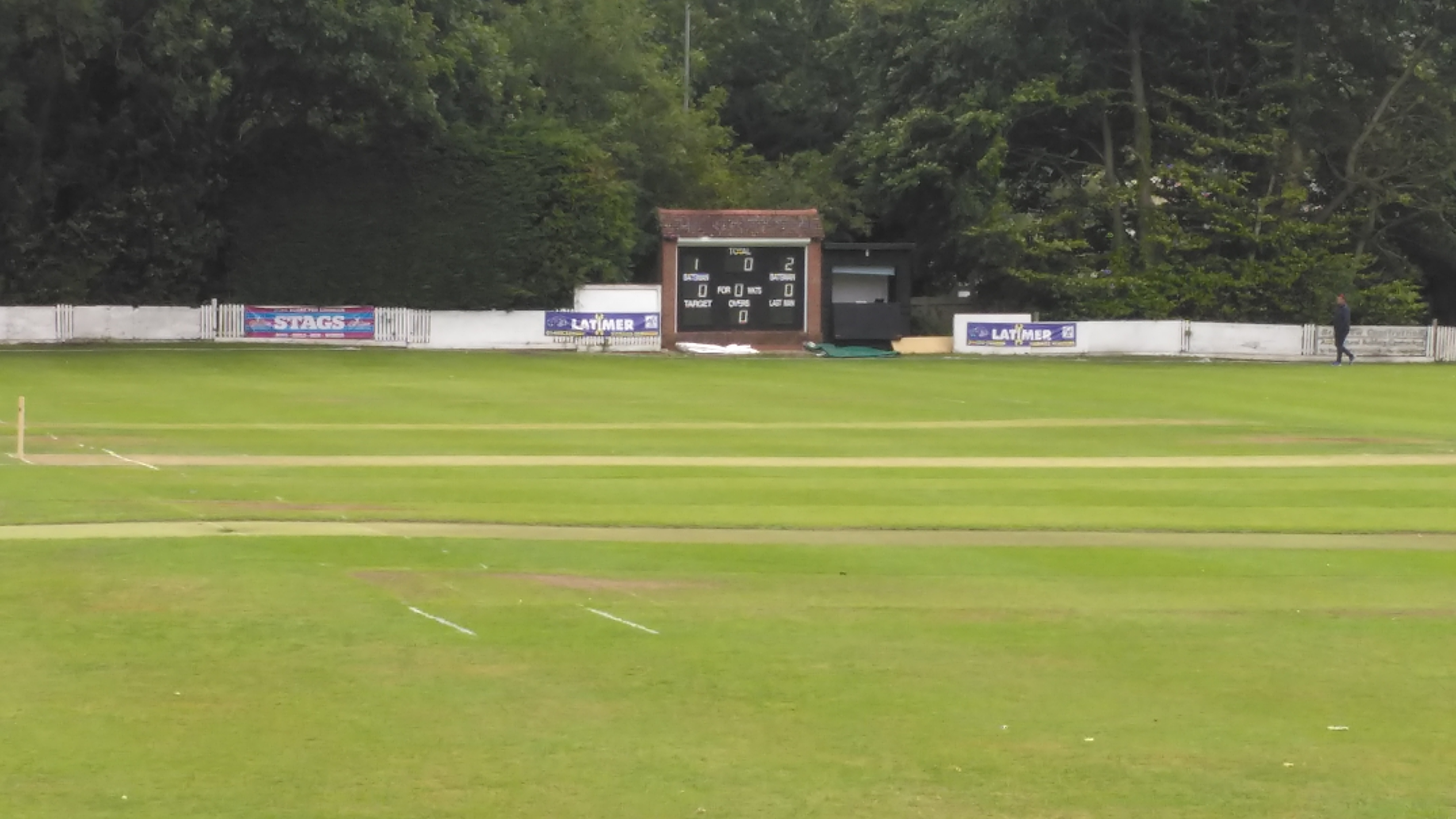
The scorebox at Amy Lane

Amy Lane, also known as The Meadow, is a cricket ground in Chesham, Buckinghamshire. The first recorded match on the ground was in 1907, Buckinghamshire played the Worcestershire Second XI. Buckinghamshire next used the ground in 1951, and from 1951 to 1982 the ground hosted 32 Minor Counties Championship matches, the last of which saw Buckinghamshire play Suffolk. Buckinghamshire returned to the ground in 1993 to play the first and only MCCA Knockout Trophy match held at the ground, against Oxfordshire.

The ground has also held 2 List-A matches. The first was between Buckinghamshire and Hampshire in 2nd round of the 1970 Gillette Cup. A Minor Counties East team played Leicestershire in the 1978 Benson and Hedges Cup, which was the final List-A match held on the ground.

In local domestic cricket, the ground is the home venue of Chesham Cricket Club.
