= John Shepperd (cricketer) =

English cricketer and umpire

Personal information
- Full name: John Shepperd
- Born: 8 May 1937; Willesden, Middlesex, England
- Died: 14 March 2020 (aged 82)
- Batting: Right-handed
- Bowling: Right-arm fast-medium

Domestic team information
- Years: Team
- 1963–1968: Norfolk
- 1959–1960: Middlesex

Career statistics
Competition	First-class	List A
Matches	4	2
Runs scored	32	6
Batting average	8.00	3.00
100s/50s	0/0	0/0
Top score	13	4
Balls bowled	507	150
Wickets	4	4
Bowling average	63.25	27.00
5 wickets in innings	–	–
10 wickets in match	–	–
Best bowling	3/35	3/23
Catches/stumpings	–/–	4/–
- Source: Cricinfo, 16 March 2012

John Shepperd (8 May 1937 – 14 March 2020) was an English cricketer and umpire. Shepperd was a right-handed batsman who bowled right-arm fast-medium. He was born at Willesden, Middlesex.

Shepperd made his first-class debut for Middlesex against the touring Indians in 1959. He made two further first-class appearances for the county, both of which came in the 1960 County Championship against Essex and Hampshire. In his three first-class matches for Middlesex, he took 4 wickets at an average of 41.75, with best figures of 3/35. With the bat, he scored 32 runs at a batting average of 8.00, with a high score of 13. He also made a single first-class appearance for L.C. Stevens' XI against Cambridge University in 1960 at The Saffrons, Eastbourne, scoring 3 runs and going wicketless.

He later joined Norfolk in Minor counties cricket, making his debut for the county in the 1963 Minor Counties Championship against Cambridgeshire. He made 65 further Minor Counties Championship appearances for Norfolk, the last of which came against Suffolk in 1968. He also played List A cricket for Norfolk, making two appearances, against Hampshire in the 1965 Gillette Cup and Cheshire in the 1968 Gillette Cup, taking 4 wickets at an average of 27.00, with best figures of 3/23.

He later stood as an umpire in two first-class matches, between the Minor Counties and the touring West Indians in 1973, and the Minor Counties and the touring Pakistanis in 1974. He also umpired in the Minor Counties Championship from 1971 to 1974, standing in 25 matches.
