= Trevor Rosier =

English cricketer (1943–2023)

Personal information
- Full name: Trevor Kenneth Rosier
- Born: 14 January 1943; Stockwell, London
- Died: 16 July 2023 (aged 80)
- Batting: Right-handed
- Bowling: Right-arm medium

Domestic team information
- Years: Team
- 1968–1973: Bedfordshire

Career statistics
Competition	List A
Matches	5
Runs scored	104
Batting average	20.80
100s/50s	0/1
Top score	52
Balls bowled	318
Wickets	5
Bowling average	45.40
5 wickets in innings	0
10 wickets in match	0
Best bowling	3/22
Catches/stumpings	2/–
- Source: Cricinfo, 4 August 2011

Trevor Kenneth Rosier (14 January 1943 – 16 July 2023) was an English cricketer who played five matches of List A cricket between 1968 and 1973. He was born in Stockwell, London.

A right-handed batsman who bowled right-arm medium, Rosier made his Minor counties debut for Bedfordshire against Cambridgeshire in the 1968 Minor Counties Championship. He played 22 matches of Minor Counties cricket for Bedfordshire from 1968 to 1973. At the end of the 1972 season, when Bedfordshire challenged Yorkshire Second XI for the championship, he took 8 for 38 in Yorkshire's first innings and then scored 118 in Bedfordshire's reply; Bedfordshire went on to win by three wickets to secure their second Minor Counties Championship.

He made his List A debut against Dorset in the 1st round of the 1968 Gillette Cup. He made 2 further List A appearances, against Hampshire in the 2nd round of the same competition and Lancashire in the 1973 Gillette Cup. In his 3 List A matches for Bedfordshire, he scored 82 runs at an average of 27.33, with a high score of 52. This score came against Hampshire. With the ball, he took 5 wickets at a bowling average of 25.00, with best figures of 3/22.

He also made List A appearances for Minor Counties South, playing 2 matches in the 1973 Benson & Hedges Cup against Hampshire and Somerset. He scored 22 runs in these matches, which came at an average of 11.00 with a high score of 19. With the ball, he bowled 18 wicket-less overs.
