= Munawwar Hussain =

Personal information
- Full name: Munawwar Hussain Agha
- Born: 17 October 1943; Hyderabad, Sind, British India
- Died: 2023; Karachi, Sindh
- Batting: Left-handed
- Bowling: Slow left-arm orthodox

Domestic team information
- Years: Team
- 1961-62 to 1965-66: Karachi
- 1964-65: Public Works Department
- 1967-68 to 1974-75: Pakistan International Airlines

Career statistics
Competition	First-class
Matches	48
Runs scored	466
Batting average	12.26
100s/50s	0/1
Top score	53
Balls bowled	10,516
Wickets	207
Bowling average	21.74
5 wickets in innings	13
10 wickets in match	3
Best bowling	8/163
Catches/stumpings	26/–
- Source: Cricinfo, 28 December 2017

Munawwar Hussain (17 October 1943 – 2023) was a Pakistani cricketer who played first-class cricket from 1961 to 1975.

== Career ==
Hussain began his cricket career at St. Paul's High School, Karachi, participating in the Rubie Shield inter-school tournament in 1957-58. He later attended S.M. College and played for local clubs, including Pak Crescent and Clifton Gymkhana, registered with the Karachi Cricket Association (KCA) in 1960.

In his debut domestic season of 1961–62, Hussain took 22 wickets at an average of 18.31, including 6-25 against Lahore 'B', contributing to Karachi Blues' victory in the Quaid-e-Azam Trophy. He played for Karachi A and Karachi Whites in subsequent seasons.

A slow left-arm orthodox spinner, he was the most successful bowler in the 1964–65 Pakistan season with 59 wickets at an average of 14.61. His best performance that season was for Public Works Department against Railways, when he took 7 for 65 and 3 for 104. Despite notable domestic performances, Hussain was not selected for Pakistan's inaugural tour of Australia and New Zealand in 1964–65.

In 1966–67 he took 6 for 35 and 2 for 56 for South Zone against the MCC Under-25 team. He later played in one of the three matches the Pakistan Under-25 team played against MCC Under-25, but took only one wicket. In 1970–71 he took his best innings and match figures: 8 for 163 and 4 for 82 (match figures of 70–10–245–12) for Pakistan International Airlines B against his former team Karachi Blues.

In 1973–74 he was the only Pakistani selected to play for a Rest of the World XI against Pakistan. He was the Rest of the World XI's most successful bowler, with five wickets. Two weeks later, captaining Pakistan International Airlines B, he took 4 for 42 and 6 for 63 in an innings victory over Quetta.

He joined Pakistan International Airlines in 1968 as a junior traffic assistant and worked with the company until he retired in January 1998. He served as a liaison officer during the 1996 Wills World Cup and as a match referee for the Pakistan Cricket Board from 2001 to 2004.
