= Bob Gale (cricketer) =

English cricketer and businessman (1933–2018)

Personal information
- Full name: Robert Alec Gale
- Born: 10 December 1933; Old Warden, Bedfordshire, England
- Died: 20 April 2018 (aged 84)
- Batting: Left-handed
- Bowling: Right-arm medium Right-arm leg-break

Domestic team information
- Years: Team
- 1956–1965: Middlesex

Career statistics
Competition	First-class	List A
Matches	242	9
Runs scored	1,2505	204
Batting average	29.35	22.66
100s/50s	15/63	0/2
Top score	200	86
Balls bowled	3,066	–
Wickets	47	–
Bowling average	37.19	–
5 wickets in innings	0	–
10 wickets in match	0	–
Best bowling	4/57	–
Catches/stumpings	126/–	2/–
- Source: Cricket Archive, 8 November 2013

Robert Alec Gale (10 December 1933 – 20 April 2018) was an English first-class cricketer and businessman.

== Life ==
Gale was born in Old Warden in Bedfordshire and was educated at Bedford Modern School, where he captained the school cricket team from 1951 to 1953. After national service in the Army, he represented Middlesex as a swashbuckling left-handed opening batsman between 1956 and 1965. He forged a successful opening partnership with Eric Russell. His highest score was 200, scored in only five hours, against Glamorgan at Newport in July 1962.

With Marylebone Cricket Club (MCC) teams he toured South America in 1964–65, Canada and the United States in 1967, and the Netherlands in 1968.

He established a successful career in the City of London following his retirement from first-class cricket. He became a longtime member of the Middlesex general committee, before serving nine years as the chairman of the cricket committee (1989–1998) and President (2001–2003).

He retired to Pevensey Bay in Sussex and died on 20 April 2018, aged 84 years and 131 days. He was the club's ninth oldest living first-class cricketer at his death.
