= Marylebone Cricket Club Under-25 cricket team in Pakistan in 1966–67 =

A team of English cricketers under 25 years of age, organised by Marylebone Cricket Club, toured Pakistan from early January to late February 1967 and played three four-day matches against a Pakistan under-25 team and four other first-class matches.

== The team ==
As England were not playing a Test series in 1966-67, the MCC were able to select a strong team. The touring team, with ages on 1 January 1967, was:

- Mike Brearley (captain) (24)
- David Brown (vice-captain) (24)
- Neal Abberley (22)
- Dennis Amiss (23)
- Geoff Arnold (22)
- Mike Bissex (22)
- Mike Buss (22)
- Keith Fletcher (22)
- Robin Hobbs (24)
- Richard Hutton (24)
- Alan Knott (20)
- Alan Ormrod (24)
- Pat Pocock (20)
- Derek Underwood (21)
- Tony Windows (24)

Buss was not in the original team. He replaced Abberley, who suffered a broken finger from a high full toss in the second match. The manager was the former Test player Les Ames.

== The tour ==
It was a tightly-packed schedule. Once the team started playing their first match they had only one day free from either match-play or travel until the end of the last match.

- South Zone v MCC Under-25, Niaz Stadium, Hyderabad, 19, 20, 21 January 1967. South Zone 210 for 7 declared and 98, MCC Under-25 168 and 141 for 2. MCC Under-25 won by eight wickets.

Amiss top-scored in each innings for MCC Under-25 with 47 and 75. Hanif Mohammad, South Zone's captain, did the same for South Zone with 73 and 35 not out. Munawwar Hussain was the outstanding bowler, with 6 for 35 and 2 for 56.

- Central Zone v MCC Under-25, Zafar Ali Stadium, Sahiwal, 23, 24, 25 January 1967. MCC Under-25 299 and 164, Central Zone 195 and 208. MCC Under-25 won by 60 runs.

Abberley made the top score of the match with 92 in the first innings. Pocock took 4 for 44 and 5 for 70. Saeed Ahmed, Central Zone's captain, made 26 and 61 and took 3 for 91 and 5 for 60.

- Pakistan Under-25 v MCC Under-25, Bagh-e-Jinnah, Lahore, 27, 28, 29, 30 January 1967. Pakistan Under-25 429 for 6 declared and 259 for 7, MCC Under-25 445. Drawn.

"A pitch of funereal pace virtually guaranteed a draw from the first ball," said the Wisden report. Mushtaq Mohammad batted nearly six hours for 120, Majid Khan made 100 not out, and Fletcher 124.

- North Zone v MCC Under-25, Peshawar Club Ground, Peshawar, 1, 2, 3 February 1967. MCC Under-25 514 for 4 declared, North Zone 126 and 249. MCC Under-25 won by an innings and 139 runs.

Brearley scored 312 not out so rapidly that he was able to declare at stumps on the first day after five and a half hours of play. He put on 208 for the first wicket with Knott (101) and 234 unbroken for the fifth wicket with Ormrod (61 not out). North Zone succumbed to the bowling of Hutton, who took a hat-trick in the first innings, and Hobbs, who took 6 for 39 and 3 for 88.

- President's XI v MCC Under-25, Pindi Club Ground, Rawalpindi, 5, 6, 7 February 1967. President's XI 157 and 177, MCC Under-25 280 and 55 for 2. MCC Under-25 won by eight wickets.

Pocock took 4 for 56 and 4 for 36. Amiss made 102.

- Pakistan Under-25 v MCC Under-25, Dacca Stadium, Dacca, 10, 11, 12, 13 February 1967. MCC Under-25 475, Pakistan Under-25 263 and 323 for 7. Drawn.

Brearley (223) and Amiss (131) added 356 for the second wicket; Pervez Sajjad took 7 for 135 off 57.2 overs for Pakistan Under-25. Following on 212 behind, Pakistan Under-25 were 124 for 4 before a fifth wicket partnership of 167 in 145 minutes by Majid Khan (95) and the captain, Asif Iqbal (117).

- A two-day match followed against an East Pakistan Governor's XI at Chittagong Stadium, Chittagong. It was drawn: MCC Under-25 made 201 for 9 declared and 182, East Pakistan Governor's XI 165.
- Pakistan Under-25 v MCC Under-25, National Stadium, Karachi, 17, 18, 19, 20 February 1967. Pakistan Under-25 220 and 217 for 8 declared, MCC Under-25 183 and 148 for 1. Drawn.

Despite the fastest pitch of the series the play was slow, and MCC Under-25 did not attempt to reach their target of 255 in 215 minutes. Mushtaq Mohammad took 7 for 73.

== Leading players ==
In the three-match series, Brearley was the highest scorer on either side with 364 runs at an average of 121.33; Amiss made 284 at 94.66. Pocock took most wickets for MCC Under-25, with 10 at 36.30, and Hobbs had 9 at 36.55.

For Pakistan Asif Iqbal made 305 runs at 50.83 and Majid Khan made 284 at 56.80. Pervez Sajjad took 11 wickets at 20.63, and Mushtaq Mohammad 10 at 17.60.

On the tour as a whole, Brearley made 793 runs in the first-class matches at an average of 132.16, and Amiss made 575 at 63.88. The leading wicket-taker was Pocock, who took 31 at 20.29, while Hobbs took 27 at 25.66.

== Aftermath ==
Only Brown, Amiss and Underwood had played Test cricket before the tour. All except Abberley, Bissex, Buss, Ormrod and Windows played Tests after the tour.

On the Pakistan side, several of the team had already played Test cricket. Of the others, Wasim Bari played his first matches for Pakistan, and immediately established himself as his country's premier wicket-keeper, and Saleem Altaf also began his international career.

After the tour, Brearley predicted that Pakistan's lack of fast bowlers, their batting difficulties against pace bowling on fast pitches, and their lack of a settled pair of opening batsmen, would all present problems for them on their forthcoming tour of England a few months later. All three predictions proved accurate, and Pakistan lost the Test series 2–0.
