= Colin Lever =

English cricketer (born 1939)

Personal information
- Born: 4 August 1939 (age 87); Todmorden, West Riding of Yorkshire, England
- Batting: Right-handed
- Bowling: Right-arm medium
- Relatives: Peter Lever (brother)

Domestic team information
- Years: Team
- 1965: Minor Counties
- 1962–1978: Buckinghamshire

Career statistics
Competition	First-class	List A
Matches	1	8
Runs scored	20	69
Batting average	10.00	11.50
100s/50s	0/0	0/0
Top score	12	20
Balls bowled	78	468
Wickets	2	7
Bowling average	11.50	43.00
5 wickets in innings	0	0
10 wickets in match	0	–
Best bowling	1/5	3/19
Catches/stumpings	0/–	2/–
- Source: Cricinfo, 3 May 2011

Colin Lever (born 4 August 1939) is a former English cricketer. Lever was an all-rounder: a right-handed batsman who bowled right-arm medium pace.

Lever made his debut for Buckinghamshire in the 1962 Minor Counties Championship against Oxfordshire. He played Minor counties cricket for Buckinghamshire from 1962 to 1978, which included 91 Minor Counties Championship matches. In 1965, he made his List A debut against Middlesex in the Gillette Cup. He played seven further List A matches for Buckinghamshire, the last coming against Middlesex in the 1975 Gillette Cup. In these eight matches, he scored 69 runs at a batting average of 11.50, with a high score of 20. With the ball he took 7 wickets at a bowling average of 43.00, with best figures of 3/19 when Buckinghamshire beat Bedfordshire in 1970.

Lever made a single first-class appearance, for a combined Minor Counties cricket team against the touring South Africans in 1965 at Osborne Avenue, Jesmond. He took the wickets of Richard Dumbrill and Ali Bacher, and scored 12 and 8. His younger brother Peter, who later played Test cricket for England, was also in the Minor Counties team.

Lever played as the professional for Heywood in the Central Lancashire League for nine consecutive seasons from 1968 to 1976, leading Heywood to the championship three times. Lever then moved to play in the Liverpool and District Cricket Competition and, after a spell with Liverpool CC, joined the Northern Cricket Club in 1979. Over the next ten seasons he hit four first-team centuries and took seven or more wickets in an innings on seven occasions. He captained the club from 1980 to 1982. Most notably he celebrated his 40th birthday by scoring an undefeated 104 and taking 7 wickets for 28 runs against neighbours Bootle on 4 August 1979. In 1992, in a second-team fixture, he took 7 wickets for 56 at the age of 53.
