= Mike Bissex =

English cricketer (born 1944)

Personal information
- Born: 28 September 1944 (age 82); Newbridge, Bath, England
- Batting: Right-handed
- Bowling: Slow left-arm orthodox

Domestic team information
- Years: Team
- 1961–1972: Gloucestershire

Career statistics
Competition	First-class	List A
Matches	212	63
Runs scored	6492	885
Batting average	20.35	17.35
100s/50s	2/30	0/0
Top score	104*	46*
Balls bowled	14989	343
Wickets	237	10
Bowling average	28.62	30.10
5 wickets in innings	11	0
10 wickets in match	2
Best bowling	7/50	2/7
Catches/stumpings	132/–	16/–
- Source: CricketArchive

Michael Bissex (born 28 September 1944) is an English former first-class cricketer. He played for Gloucestershire County Cricket Club from 1961 to 1972.

Bissex joined the Gloucestershire ground-staff after leaving school at the age of 15.

In 1967 he toured Pakistan with the MCC Under-25 side, and in 1968 he represented England's Under-25 side.

Bissex received his county cap in 1970.

His domestic career ended when he was released by Gloucestershire at the end of the 1972 season. According to the 1973 Wisden, he could not find his bowling form and his batting had also declined. The club awarded him £1,000 for his "loyal services and in view of a loss of a benefit".
