= Neal Abberley =

English cricketer

Personal information
- Full name: Robert Neal Abberley
- Born: 22 April 1944; Stechford, Birmingham, England
- Died: 8 August 2011 (aged 67); Solihull, Warwickshire, England
- Batting: Right-handed
- Bowling: Right-arm medium
- Role: Batsman

Domestic team information
- Years: Team
- 1964–1979: Warwickshire
- FC debut: 13 May 1964 Warwickshire v Cambridge University
- Last FC: 22 June 1979 Warwickshire v Yorkshire

Career statistics
Competition	First-class	List A
Matches	261	133
Runs scored	10,082	2,350
Batting average	24.47	21.17
100s/50s	3/60	1/10
Top score	117*	113*
Balls bowled	474	490
Wickets	5	11
Bowling average	58.80	34.81
5 wickets in innings	0	0
10 wickets in match	0	0
Best bowling	2/19	2/26
Catches/stumpings	171/–	33/–
- Source: CricketArchive, 9 August 2011

Robert Neal Abberley (22 April 1944 – 8 August 2011) was an English first-class cricketer. A stalwart county player, he was a right-handed batsman and occasional right arm medium pace bowler.

He was born in Stechford, Birmingham and educated at Saltley Grammar School. He played for his native Warwickshire from 1964 to 1979.

He had a modest batting record (he averaged under 25 as a specialist batsman), and played over 250 times for the "Bears". He made 3 first-class hundreds, with a best of 117 not out against Essex and scored his only one day hundred, 113 not out, against Hampshire.

He moved into coaching in 1980 after retiring from the game, initially as Warwickshire's Second XI coach and later with a 'roving brief' at all levels in the club. He was particularly involved in the development of Ian Bell and the England team wore black armbands in his honour during the Test against India at Edgbaston in the days following his death.

== Playing career ==
Abberley made his first-class debut for Warwickshire in 1964 against Cambridge University, scoring a half-century in the drawn match. The following year, he made his County Championship debut against Yorkshire, but was unable to bat due to injury. In 1966, Abberley struck his first-class century, scoring 117 not out against Essex, the highest first-class score of his career. The 1966 season proved to be Abberley's most prolific in first-class cricket, with 1315 runs scored at an average of 28.58. He toured Pakistan with an Under 25 MCC side in 1966/67, in a squad featuring a number of current and future England stars such as Mike Brearley, Dennis Amiss, Alan Knott and Derek Underwood. Abberley scored 92 and 31 in his only match on this tour, against Central Zone.
