= Derek Hayward =

English cricketer (born 1940)

Personal information
- Full name: Derek Reginald Hayward
- Born: 7 December 1940 (age 85); Wyke Regis, Dorset, England
- Batting: Right-handed
- Bowling: Right-arm medium

Domestic team information
- Years: Team
- 1961–1983: Dorset

Career statistics
Competition	LA
Matches	3
Runs scored	11
Batting average	3.66
100s/50s	–/–
Top score	7
Balls bowled	216
Wickets	6
Bowling average	10.33
5 wickets in innings	–
10 wickets in match	–
Best bowling	3/15
Catches/stumpings	–/–
- Source: Cricinfo, 22 March 2010

Derek Reginald Hayward (born 7 December 1940) is a former English List A cricketer. Hayward was a right-handed batsman who bowled right-arm medium pace.

Hayward made his debut for Dorset in the 1961 Minor Counties Championship against Wiltshire. Baker represented Dorset in 138 Minor Counties Championship matches from 1961 to 1983, with his final Minor Counties match for the county coming against Devon.

In 1968, Hayward made his List-A debut for Dorset against Bedfordshire in the 1968 Gillette Cup. Hayward played 2 further List-A matches for the county against Staffordshire in the 1973 Gillette Cup and against Essex in the 1983 NatWest Trophy.

In his 3 List-A matches for the county he took 6 wickets at a bowling average of 10.33, with best figures of 3/15 against Essex.
