= Wes Stewart =

Jamaican-born English cricketer (1945–2019)

Personal information
- Full name: Richard William Stewart
- Born: 28 February 1945; Portland, Jamaica
- Died: 15 June 2019 (aged 74)
- Batting: Right-handed
- Role: Bowler

Domestic team information
- Years: Team
- 1966: Gloucestershire
- 1966–1968: Middlesex

Career statistics
Competition	FC	List A
Matches	52	6
Runs scored	107	3
Batting average	4.28	1.50
100s/50s	–/–	–/–
Top score	19	1*
Balls bowled	8384	348
Wickets	131	7
Bowling average	23.91	30.71
5 wickets in innings	5	–
10 wickets in match	–	–
Best bowling	6–65	4–41
Catches/stumpings	17/0	0/0
- Source: Cricinfo, 22 June 2019

Richard William "Wes" Stewart (28 February 1945 – 15 June 2019) was a Jamaican-born English cricketer. He played for Gloucestershire in 1966 and for Middlesex between 1966 and 1968.

== Biography ==
Stewart was born in Jamaica, and came to Britain in 1955, aged 10, as one of the "Windrush generation". In 1968 he made a trip back to Jamaica, where his mother was dying, using a British passport. However, it expired while he was there, and he acquired a Jamaican passport, which he used to return to the UK and continued his career as a cricketer.

In 1966, Stewart was selected to play a single match for Gloucestershire, against Oxford University, and he then transferred to Middlesex. On his 1966 debut in the County Championship, he took six wickets for 65 against Glamorgan. He took 70 wickets, averaging 22, in 1966, and 49 in 1967. He was dropped from the Middlesex squad in 1969.

He acquired the nickname 'Wes', probably by analogy with the fast bowler from Barbados, Wes Hall, though in fact Stewart's pace was not much above medium, and there was an element of irony in this naming.

Stewart worked in a furniture factory, then making cookers for Belling, and subsequently as a painter and decorator.

In around 2011, he discovered that, because he had used a Jamaican passport in the 1960s, after Jamaica became independent in 1962, he had lost his British nationality. His immigration status was in doubt, and he was at risk of deportation. To naturalise as British, his application would cost £1,400, which he said he could not afford. He wished to make a family visit to Jamaica again, but was concerned that he would not be readmitted to Britain.

He finally received a new British passport, but did not get any compensation from the Home Office, despite promises made to him. That remained the position when, on 22 June 2019, it was announced that Stewart had died a week prior.
