= Don Bates =

English cricketer

Personal information
- Full name: Donald Lawson Bates
- Born: 10 May 1933; Hove, Sussex, England
- Died: 29 May 2005 (aged 72); Brighton, Sussex
- Batting: Right-handed
- Bowling: Right-arm fast-medium

Domestic team information
- Years: Team
- 1950 to 1971: Sussex

Career statistics
Competition	FC	List A
Matches	315	47
Runs scored	1525	74
Batting average	7.58	6.16
100s/50s	0/0	0/0
Top score	37 not out	38
Balls bowled	50,381	2524
Wickets	880	63
Bowling average	25.88	24.65
5 wickets in innings	34	1
10 wickets in match	2	n/a
Best bowling	8/51	6/30
Catches/stumpings	118/–	14/–
- Source: Cricket Archive, 15 October 2015

Donald Lawson Bates (10 May 1933 – 29 May 2005) was an English cricketer active from 1950 to 1971 who played for Sussex. He was born in Hove and died in Brighton. He appeared in 315 first-class matches as a right-handed batsman who bowled right-arm fast-medium. He scored 1,525 runs with a highest score of 37 not out and took 880 wickets with a best performance of eight for 51. He was awarded his county cap in 1957 and had a benefit in 1968 which raised £8,000.
