= Colin Smith (Buckinghamshire cricketer) =

English cricketer

Colin Smith is a former English cricketer. He was a right-arm medium-fast bowler and right-handed batsman who played for Buckinghamshire.

Smith represented Buckinghamshire in the Minor Counties Championship between 1954 and 1967 as a pace bowler. He made a single List A appearance for the side, during the 1965 season, against Middlesex at Lord's in the Gillette Cup. In ten overs of bowling, he took 3 for 32; then, batting at number 11, he scored a duck.
