= James Merryweather =

English cricketer

Personal information
- Full name: James Herbert Merryweather
- Born: 2 May 1929; Rowlands Gill, County Durham, England
- Died: 19 February 2000 (aged 70); Bath, Somerset, England
- Batting: Right-handed
- Bowling: Right-arm off break

Domestic team information
- Years: Team
- 1972: Minor Counties South
- 1954–1979: Wiltshire

Career statistics
Competition	LA
Matches	9
Runs scored	6
Batting average	–
100s/50s	–/–
Top score	4*
Balls bowled	522
Wickets	18
Bowling average	16.50
5 wickets in innings	–
10 wickets in match	–
Best bowling	3/22
Catches/stumpings	5/–
- Source: Cricinfo, 9 October 2010

James Herbert Merryweather (2 May 1929 – 19 February 2000) was an English cricketer. Merryweather was a right-handed batsman who bowled right-arm off break. He was born at Rowlands Gill, County Durham.

Merryweather made his Minor Counties Championship debut for Wiltshire in 1954 against the Surrey Second XI. From 1954 to 1979, he represented the county in 119 Minor Counties Championship matches, the last of which came against Berkshire. He took 714 wickets for Wiltshire.

Merryweather also represented Wiltshire in List-A cricket. His List-A debut for the county came against Hampshire in the 1964 Gillette Cup. From 1964 to 1973, he represented the county in 5 matches, the last of which came against Hampshire in the 1973 Gillette Cup. Merryweather also represented Minor Counties South in the 1972 Benson and Hedges Cup, playing 4 List-A matches for the team. In his combined List-A matches, he took 18 wickets at a bowling average of 16.50, with best figures of 3/22.

Merryweather died at Bath, Somerset on 19 February 2000.
