= Barrie Whittingham =

English cricketer (born 1940)

Personal information
- Full name: Norman Barrie Whittingham
- Born: 22 October 1940 (age 86); Silsden, Yorkshire, England
- Batting: Left-handed
- Bowling: Right-arm off-break
- Role: Batter

Domestic team information
- Years: Team
- 1962–1966: Nottinghamshire

Career statistics
Competition	First-class	List A
Matches	77	5
Runs scored	2,964	85
Batting average	22.11	17.00
100s/50s	2/15	–/1
Top score	133	69
Balls bowled	178	–
Wickets	1	–
Bowling average	122.00	–
5 wickets in innings	–	–
10 wickets in match	–	–
Best bowling	1/9	–
Catches/stumpings	40/–	–/–
- Source: CricketArchive, 4 November 2024

Norman Barrie Whittingham (born 22 October 1940) is an English former first-class cricketer who played for Nottinghamshire from 1962 to 1966. He was mostly used as an opening bat and had a successful first full season in 1963, but was unable to retain a regular starting place in later years.
