= Fred Price (cricketer) =

English cricketer

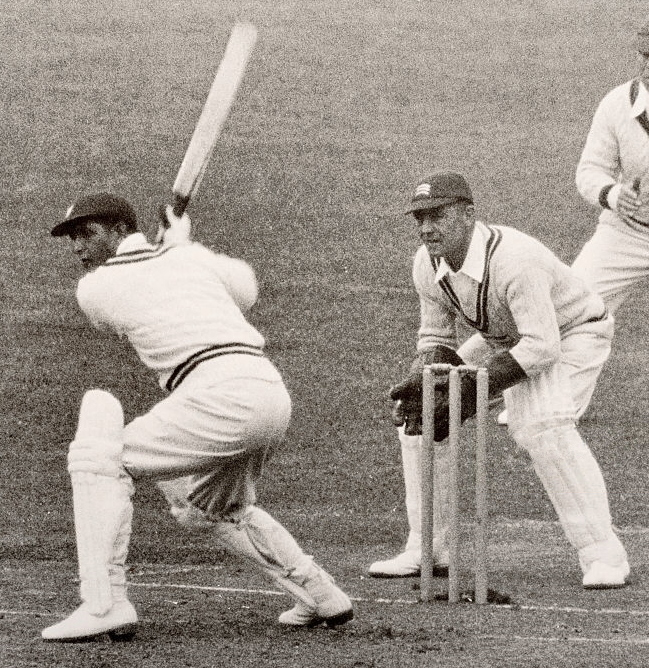
- Price (right) in 1936

Personal information
- Born: 25 April 1902; Westminster, London
- Died: 13 January 1969 (aged 66); Hendon, Greater London
- Batting: Right-handed

International information
- National side: England
- Only Test (cap 303): 22 July 1938 v Australia

Career statistics
Competition	Test	First-class
Matches	1	402
Runs scored	6	9,035
Batting average	3.00	18.32
100s/50s	0/0	3/36
Top score	6	111
Catches/stumpings	2/0	668/322
- Source: CricketArchive, 6 November 2022

Wilfred Frederick Frank Price (25 April 1902 – 13 January 1969) was a cricketer who played for Middlesex County Cricket Club from 1926 to 1947. Price also stood as an umpire from 1950 to 1967. He played in one Test match and officiated as an umpire in eight.

Price was a wicket-keeper who took 648 catches and 316 stumpings in his first-class career.

Price was unfortunate to be around in the same era as Les Ames, which limited Price's opportunities for an international career. He toured abroad twice, once with the Honourable Freddie Calthorpe's side in 1929/30, when he went as a replacement for Rony Stanyforth, and then on a non-Test tour to South America in 1937/8.

Price's reputation as an umpire was as someone who would stand up strongly for what he felt was right. He once no-balled Tony Lock, the Surrey and England spin bowler for throwing against India. He also lay down at square-leg, refusing to get up, to stop barracking at a Surrey-Yorkshire game. He was also involved in an argument with Gary Sobers about no balls in a match between the West Indian tourists and Sussex at Hove in 1963. After the game he sent a letter to the MCC complaining about the players' behaviour.
