= Frederick Baines (cricketer) =

English cricketer

Personal information
- Full name: Frederick Charles Baines
- Born: 12 November 1941 (age 85); Preston, Lancashire, England
- Batting: Left-handed
- Bowling: Right-arm medium

Domestic team information
- Years: Team
- 1963–1977: Berkshire

Career statistics
Competition	LA
Matches	3
Runs scored	8
Batting average	–
100s/50s	–/–
Top score	4*
Balls bowled	221
Wickets	2
Bowling average	58.00
5 wickets in innings	–
10 wickets in match	–
Best bowling	2/43
Catches/stumpings	1/–
- Source: Cricinfo, 22 September 2010

Frederick Charles Baines (born 12 November 1941) is a former English cricketer. Baines was a left-handed batsman who bowled right-arm medium pace. He was born at Preston, Lancashire.

Baines made his Minor Counties Championship debut for Berkshire in 1963 against Devon. From 1963 to 1977, he represented the county in 53 Minor Counties Championship matches, the last of which came in the 1977 Championship when Berkshire played Dorset.

Additionally, he also played List-A matches for Berkshire. His List-A debut for the county came against Somerset in the 1965 Gillette Cup. From 1965 to 1966, he represented the county in 3 matches, with his final List-A match coming when Berkshire played Gloucestershire in the 2nd round of the 1966 Gillette Cup at Church Road Cricket Ground, Reading. In his 3 matches, he scored 8 runs, with all his innings being not outs, with a high score of 4*. With the ball he took 2 wickets at a bowling average of 58.00, with best figures of 2/43.
