= Mike Buss =

English cricketer (born 1944)

Personal information
- Full name: Michael Alan Buss
- Born: 24 January 1944 (age 82); Brightling, Sussex, England
- Batting: Left-handed
- Bowling: Left-arm medium, slow left-arm orthodox
- Role: All-rounder
- Relatives: Tony Buss (brother)

Domestic team information
- Years: Team
- 1961–1978: Sussex
- 1972/73–1977/78: Orange Free State

Career statistics
Competition	FC	List A
Matches	316	196
Runs scored	11,996	3,634
Batting average	23.99	21.12
100s/50s	11/58	1/18
Top score	159	121
Balls bowled	36,965	6,684
Wickets	547	159
Bowling average	28.02	25.24
5 wickets in innings	15	3
10 wickets in match	0	–
Best bowling	7/58	6/14
Catches/stumpings	232/–	71/–
- Source: Cricinfo, 22 August 2025

Michael Alan Buss (born 24 January 1944) is an English former cricketer who played for Sussex from 1961 to 1978. He also played four seasons in South Africa in the 1970s, representing Orange Free State. He appeared in 316 first-class matches as a left-handed batsman who bowled left-arm medium and slow left-arm orthodox. He scored 11,996 runs with a highest score of 159 among eleven centuries and took 547 wickets with a best performance of seven for 58. Tony Buss, who also played for Sussex, was his brother.

Buss was a member of the MCC Under-25 team that toured Pakistan in 1966–67. He replaced Neal Abberley, who had to return home after an injury in the early part of the tour.
