= Keith Davis (cricketer) =

English cricketer

Keith Davis (5 December 1935 – 7 January 2026) was an English cricketer. He was a left-handed batsman and right-arm slow-medium bowler who played for Cornwall. He was born in St Germans.

Davis made a single List A appearance for the side, during the 1970 season, against Glamorgan. From the middle order, he scored 4 runs. Davis bowled twelve overs in the match, taking figures of 2–30.
