= Peter Lever =

English cricketer (1940–2025)

Personal information
- Born: 17 September 1940; Todmorden, West Riding of Yorkshire, England
- Died: 27 March 2025 (aged 84)
- Batting: Right-handed
- Bowling: Right-arm fast-medium
- Relatives: Colin Lever (brother)

Career statistics
Competition	Test	ODI	FC
Matches	17	10	301
Runs scored	350	17	3534
Batting average	21.87	17.00	14.25
100s/50s	0/2	0/0	0/11
Top score	88*	8*	88*
Balls bowled	3571	440	45,945
Wickets	41	11	796
Bowling average	36.80	23.72	25.59
5 wickets in innings	2	0	28
10 wickets in match	0	n/a	2
Best bowling	6/38	4/35	7/70
Catches/stumpings	11/–	2/–	106/–
- Source: Cricinfo, 15 October 2022

Peter Lever (17 September 1940 – 27 March 2025) was an English cricketer, who played in seventeen Tests and ten ODIs for England from 1970 to 1975. A fast-medium opening bowler, he took 41 wickets and was a handy lower-order batsman with a top score of 88 not out. Towards the end of his career, during a Test match against New Zealand, he almost killed the New Zealand Test debutant Ewen Chatfield with a bouncer.

== Biography ==
Lever was born in Todmorden in West Yorkshire, England on 17 September 1940. His brother Colin was also a successful cricketer.

Lever played for Lancashire and Tasmania in a successful first-class career of 301 matches from 1960 until 1976, which yielded Lever 796 wickets and 3,534 runs. The inclusion of John Snow, Jeff Jones, David Brown and Ken Higgs in the England team delayed Lever's debut until, when aged 30, he played against Australia at Perth on 1 December 1970. He managed only two with the bat, but took a wicket in each innings.

Lever could deliver a dangerous bouncer, despite his gentle nature. Both were in evidence during a Test match between New Zealand and England in 1975 at Eden Park, Auckland, when New Zealand number 11 Ewen Chatfield was struck on the temple by one of Lever's bouncers. Chatfield's life was saved by the England team physiotherapist who performed mouth-to-mouth resuscitation and heart massage. Lever, in abject horror, fell to his knees, and had to be helped off the pitch by his team-mates. Lever later recalled: "I honestly thought I had killed him as I saw him lying there in convulsions. I felt sick and ashamed at what I had done and all I could think when I got back to the pavilion was that I wanted to retire." However, when Lever visited Chatfield in hospital later, Chatfield assured Lever that the incident was not his fault. Lever went on to take 41 wickets in Test cricket, at 36.80 and including best bowling figures of 6/38, before his final Test ended on 5 August 1975 during another Ashes tour, Australia facing England at Lord's.

Lever also played ten One Day Internationals, including all England's matches the 1975 Cricket World Cup, taking 11 wickets but scoring only 17 runs. His ODI debut was also against Australia, at Melbourne on 5 January 1971, the first one-day international of all, and his last match was the world cup semi final at Headingley, Leeds, again against Australia, on 18 June 1975. This gives Lever the unusual distinction of having played both his debut, and last match, against Australia during Ashes tours, in both the Test and one day form of the game.

Lever's best Test bowling figures came in an Ashes match, the Test match prior to the Chatfield incident, the sixth test against Australia in 1974/5. England having previously been overwhelmed in this series, principally by the performances of Jeff Thomson and Dennis Lillee, Wisden observed of this match that "England's big victory, impossible to foresee before the match even though Australia were without the injured Thomson, had its roots in Lever's excellent bowling on the first morning". Lever had previously taken even better figures, 7/83, for England against the Rest of the World XI captained by Garfield Sobers in 1970. At the time this match had Test match status, although it was subsequently withdrawn. Lever made 88 not out, his highest first-class score, in a Test match against India in 1971, sharing an 8th wicket stand of 168 with Ray Illingworth, still as of 2022 England's highest eighth-wicket stand against India in Test matches. Lever also took his first Test five-wicket haul in the same match.

Lever's domestic career continued until 1976 in first-class cricket, and until 1983 in List-A. He then went on to become a coach at his old club, Lancashire. In the mid-1990s Lever also assisted Illingworth during his time as chairman of selectors.

In later years he helped coach at Lewdown Cricket Club in Devon.

Lever died following a short illness on 27 March 2025, at the age of 84.
