= Brian Brain =

English cricketer (1940–2023)

Personal information
- Full name: Brian Maurice Brain
- Born: 13 September 1940; Worcester, England
- Died: 1 November 2023 (aged 83)
- Batting: Right-handed
- Bowling: Right-arm fast-medium

Career statistics
| Competition | First-class | List A |
|---|---|---|
| Matches | 259 | 204 |
| Runs scored | 1,704 | 497 |
| Batting average | 8.39 | 8.28 |
| 100s/50s | 0/1 | 0/0 |
| Top score | 57 | 33 |
| Balls bowled | 41,028 | 9,776 |
| Wickets | 824 | 290 |
| Bowling average | 24.50 | 20.14 |
| 5 wickets in innings | 33 | 0 |
| 10 wickets in match | 6 | 0 |
| Best bowling | 8/55 | 4/13 |
| Catches/stumpings | 50/– | 36/– |
- Source: Cricinfo, 14 April 2023

Brian Maurice Brain (13 September 1940 – 1 November 2023) was an English first-class cricketer whose career with Worcestershire and Gloucestershire stretched over more than two decades. He was capped by Worcestershire in 1966 and by Gloucestershire in 1977.

== Biography ==
Brain was born on 13 September 1940 in Worcester, England, and was educated at the city's King's School.

After turning in some good performances in the Worcestershire second team, Brain was selected to make his first-class debut against Oxford University in late June 1959. He took five wickets in the match (his first being that of Oxford captain Alan Smith), but played only one further first-class game that season, against Somerset in the County Championship. He took 4–53 in the first innings, but was not to make another first-team appearance for almost five years.

After some more eye-catching figures in the second team (7–29 against Nottinghamshire II; 8–79 against Kent II) in 1964, Brain finally played first-class cricket again, facing Cambridge University at Halesowen. He took only one wicket, but was retained for the Championship game which followed (coincidentally this was also against Somerset), and in this match he excelled, taking 6–93 and 4–73 as Worcestershire won by 122 runs. Although he dropped out of the side thereafter, he returned as a regular from mid-August to the end of the season, finishing with 31 wickets at 24.19 as Worcestershire won their first ever County Championship.

In the 1965 season Brain appeared 12 times, finishing with 44 total wickets. For most of the rest of the 1960s, he continued to play a dozen games a season or slightly more, as well as a handful of one-day matches, and to pick up around 40 wickets a year. In 1969, however, he played 19 times in first-class cricket and snared 73 wickets, however, the following year he left the county but continued to play one-day cricket for them.

The 1973 season saw Brain make his return to first-class duties, taking 84 wickets that year, winning his third Championship medal in 1974. For the 1976 season, he moved to Gloucestershire, starting relatively slowly with 41 first-class wickets in that first year. Then in 1977 he claimed 77 wickets, managing his best bowling for his new county when he recorded 7–51 against the touring Australians in May. Now approaching forty years old, Brain's form began to tail off, and after leaving Gloucestershire in 1981, he spent a season at Shropshire, and retired at the end of the summer.

Brain died on 1 November 2023, aged 83. His funeral was held in Worcester.
