= Rex Gautrey =

English cricketer and footballer (1928–2001)

Personal information
- Full name: Rex Alan Gautrey
- Born: 6 January 1928; Cottenham, Cambridgeshire, England
- Died: 8 December 2001 (aged 73); Soham, Cambridgeshire, England
- Batting: Right-handed
- Role: Wicketkeeper

Domestic team information
- Years: Team
- 1949–1972: Cambridgeshire

Career statistics
Competition	LA
Matches	4
Runs scored	74
Batting average	18.50
100s/50s	–/–
Top score	26
Balls bowled	–
Wickets	–
Bowling average	–
5 wickets in innings	–
10 wickets in match	–
Best bowling	–
Catches/stumpings	2/–
- Source: Cricinfo, 18 July 2010

Rex Alan Gautrey (6 January 1928 – 8 December 2001) was an English cricketer and footballer. Gautrey was a right-handed batsman who played primarily as a wicketkeeper. He was born at Cottenham, Cambridgeshire.

== Cricket career ==
Gautrey made his debut for Cambridgeshire in the 1949 Minor Counties Championship against Berkshire. From 1949 to 1972, he represented the county in 104 Minor Counties matches, with his final Minor Counties appearance coming against Lincolnshire.

Gautrey also represented Cambridgeshire in List-A cricket, making his debut in that format of the game for the county against Essex in the 1964 Gillette Cup. He represented Cambridgeshire in a further 3 List-A matches, with his final List-A match coming against Yorkshire in the 1967 Gillette Cup. In his 4 List-A matches, he scored 74 runs at a batting average of 18.50, with a high score of 75. Behind the stumps he took 2 catches. Gautrey also captained Cambridgeshire on a number of occasions.

== Football career ==
Gautrey also played football for Histon and for Cambridgeshire itself. Gautrey died on 8 December 2001.
