= Colin Milburn =

English cricketer

Personal information
- Born: 23 October 1941; Burnopfield, County Durham, England
- Died: 28 February 1990 (aged 48); Aycliffe Village, County Durham, England
- Nickname: Ollie
- Batting: Right-handed
- Bowling: Right-arm medium
- Role: Batsman

International information
- National side: England
- Test debut (cap 431): 2 June 1966 v West Indies
- Last Test: 6 March 1969 v Pakistan

Domestic team information
- Years: Team
- 1960–1974: Northamptonshire
- 1966/67–1968/69: Western Australia
- 1976: Durham

Career statistics
Competition	Test	FC	LA
Matches	9	255	45
Runs scored	654	13,262	610
Batting average	46.71	33.07	15.25
100s/50s	2/2	23/75	0/3
Top score	139	243	84
Balls bowled	–	7,033	1,351
Wickets	–	99	41
Bowling average	–	32.03	22.82
5 wickets in innings	–	1	0
10 wickets in match	–	0	0
Best bowling	–	6/59	4/34
Catches/stumpings	7/–	224/–	11/–
- Source: CricketArchive, 18 September 2009

Colin Milburn (23 October 1941 – 28 February 1990) was an English cricketer, who played in nine Test matches for England, before an accident led to the loss of much of his sight and prompted his retirement.

Cricket writer Colin Bateman commented, "he was a clean, natural hitter of the ball who had an infectious zest for the game and life". Bateman added, "he hit the ball with the strength of a lumberjack and he had the courage of a lion, but he was no Neanderthal clubber".

== Early life ==
Milburn was born in Burnopfield, County Durham. His father, a local tradesman, was a noted professional player in Tyneside league cricket. The young Colin showed exceptional talent at the game, making his first-team debut at the age of thirteen. As a seventeen-year-old school pupil, he made his debut for Durham (then still a Minor county) in 1959, against the touring Indian team. Playing at Sunderland, Milburn scored a dynamic century, which brought him to the attention of the first-class counties. He dedicated the century to his school friend Stuart Turner, stating "that was for you Stu".

Milburn obtained seven O-levels from school in 1958 and went half-way through his A-levels when he left school for a cricket career. Milburn's mother wanted him to go to Teacher Training College before taking up cricket.

== First-class career ==
In 1960, Milburn signed for Northamptonshire because they offered 10 shillings a week more than Warwickshire. He soon made a name for himself with his forceful strokeplay and useful medium-paced bowling, backed up by a larger-than-life, gregarious and convivial personality. By 1963 he was being talked about for the England team, but an indifferent game for Marylebone Cricket Club (MCC) against Frank Worrell's West Indians meant he was passed over. He also taught PE during the off season at Cherry Orchard SM School in Northampton, just about a mile from the site of his later accident.

== Test career ==
Milburn had a reputation as an all-or-nothing batsman, sparkling centuries alternating with indifferent scores, but by 1966 he had forced himself back into the Test reckoning. Selected for the First Test against the West Indies, he had the most ignominious start for an opener, run out for a first-innings duck. He redeemed himself with 94 in the second innings as England went down to a heavy defeat. An aggressive century (126 not out) helped England to draw the Second Test, and despite standing up courageously to the formidable Caribbean pace attack in the following matches, he was dropped for the final Test, supposedly because his bulk hindered his mobility in the field. Milburn's riposte was typical of the man, an innings of 203 for Northamptonshire against Essex. His swashbuckling season earned him a nomination as one of Wisden's Cricketers of the Year in the 1967 edition.

That winter Milburn travelled to Australia, where he played Sheffield Shield cricket for Western Australia. He played two Tests in 1967, scoring 40 against India and 32 against Pakistan in 1967, and was selected to tour the West Indies in the winter, where he was much more successful off the field than on. He was picked for the Lord's Test against Australia in 1968, scoring 83, mostly before lunch on the second day, almost all of the first being lost to rain. He had been listed to bat at number six, but was sent in with an aggressive move by England at the fall of the first wicket. The fact that he was an experienced opener was presumably a factor, the first wicket falling quite early. Milburn returned to Perth, where he enjoyed a prolific season for Western Australia. The highlight was an innings of 243 against Queensland in Brisbane, where he scored 181 runs between lunch and tea. Milburn was called up in an emergency to reinforce the MCC touring party in Pakistan. He scored a spectacular 139 in the Karachi Test in March 1969, before it was abandoned because of rioting. It was his highest Test score in what would prove to be his final Test innings.

== Injury and retirement ==
Returning to Northampton for the 1969 season, Milburn started out with 158 against Leicestershire. On 23 May, he was returning home when he was involved in a motor accident. This cost him the sight of his left eye, the lead eye for a right-handed batsman. His right eye was also damaged. Taking as an example the Nawab of Pataudi, who had resumed his career after suffering eye damage, Milburn harboured thoughts of a comeback. On 8 January 1971, The Times reported his retirement, but Milburn did return in 1973 and 1974. However, he was a shadow of his former self, and these games did little beyond reducing his career batting average.

== After cricket ==
Milburn continued in league cricket, and went into the world of coaching youngsters, after dinner speaking, public appearances and radio commentary. However, on 28 February 1990, he collapsed with a heart attack in Newton Aycliffe and died in the ambulance on the way to hospital. His funeral was attended by hundreds, including ex-players and fans, with Ian Botham one of the pallbearers. Nicknamed "Ollie" in reference to Oliver Hardy. Milburn never married. He is buried at Burnopfield.

He was a subject of the television programme This Is Your Life in April 1970.
