= John Gordon Williamson =

English cricketer (1936–2023)

John Gordon Williamson (4 April 1936 – 25 January 2023) was an English cricketer active from 1958 to 1974 who played for Northamptonshire (Northants) in the 1959 to 1962 seasons.

Williamson was born in Norton-on-Tees, Durham on 4 April 1936. He appeared in 56 first-class matches as a righthanded batsman who bowled right arm fast medium pace. He scored 820 runs with a highest score of 106 not out and took 120 wickets with a best performance of six for 47. Williamson played for Durham and Cheshire in the Minor Counties Championship. In 1965, he changed his surname to Barkass-Williamson. Williamson later lived in Solihull, and died on 25 January 2023, at the age of 86.
