= Alan Ormrod =

English cricketer (born 1942)

Personal information
- Born: 22 December 1942 (age 83); Ramsbottom, Lancashire, England
- Batting: Right-handed
- Bowling: Right-arm offbreak

Career statistics
Competition	First-class	List A
Matches	500	286
Runs scored	23,206	6,398
Batting average	30.90	25.18
100s/50s	32/113	2/34
Top score	204*	124*
Balls bowled	1,794	153
Wickets	25	4
Bowling average	43.76	33.50
5 wickets in innings	1	0
10 wickets in match	0	0
Best bowling	5/27	3/51
Catches/stumpings	400/0	78/0
- Source: CricketArchive, 20 April 2019

Joseph Alan Ormrod (born 22 December 1942) is a former English first-class cricketer who played for Worcestershire and Lancashire.

A right-handed opening batsman, Ormrod was a key member in Worcestershire's back to back Championship winning sides of 1964 and 1965. He passed 1,000 runs in a season on 12 occasions with a best of 1,535 runs in 1978. He toured Pakistan with MCC Under-25 in 1966–67.

Ormrod scored a total of 21,753 runs for Worcestershire and is their only batsman to have scored a century in both innings of a match against Somerset, which he did in 1980. He finished his career with a brief stint at Lancashire.

Ormrod's early cricketing exploits were in Scotland as a reliable and stylish opening batsman for the Kirkcaldy High School 1st XI (average 35.1 in the 1959 season).
