= Ron Hooker =

English cricketer (1935–2019)

Personal information
- Full name: Ronald William Hooker
- Born: 22 February 1935; Lower Clapton, London, England
- Died: 22 February 2019 (aged 84)
- Batting: Right-handed
- Bowling: Right-arm medium

Domestic team information
- Years: Team
- 1970–1975: Buckinghamshire
- 1956–1969: Middlesex

Career statistics
Competition	First-class	List A
Matches	300	32
Runs scored	8,222	574
Batting average	22.16	27.33
100s/50s	5/36	–/1
Top score	137	65
Balls bowled	32,131	1,517
Wickets	490	41
Bowling average	27.46	21.46
5 wickets in innings	16	1
10 wickets in match	–	–
Best bowling	7/18	6/6
Catches/stumpings	302/–	16/–
- Source: Cricinfo, 25 June 2011

Ronald William Hooker (22 February 1935 – 22 February 2019) was an English cricketer. Hooker was a right-handed batsman who bowled right-arm medium pace. A successful all-rounder, Hooker played for the first-class county Middlesex and later for the minor county Buckinghamshire, in a career which spanned from 1956 to 1975. He was born in Lower Clapton, London.

== Middlesex ==
The years between 1959 and 1963, together with 1966, were his most productive seasons with the bat. In 1959 he scored 1,449 runs in first-class matches at an average of 30.18. That year, in 52 innings he reached 50 on 13 occasions, though he only went on to a century once. He only exceeded 1,000 runs in one other season, 1963, with 1,083. The previous season he had recorded his highest average, 34.78, but narrowly failed to reach a thousand runs.

His most productive period as a bowler was from 1961 to 1966, when he took over 40 wickets every season. During this period, only twice did his average fall outside the narrow range 23.88 to 26.81: in 1966 he averaged 21.70 and in 1962 he had a relatively poor season and averaged 33.44. He took most wickets in 1965, with 90, and also had his best innings analysis of 7/18. Perhaps because he had to do much more bowling than usual that season, he had a very poor season with the bat.

He was an excellent close fielder, especially at short leg. Between 1959 and 1965, only in 1964 did he take fewer than 26 catches in a season. In 1961 he held 38 in 26 matches and in 1963, 37 in 30 matches. Arguably his catching was even better in the intervening season, when he held 34 in only 21 matches.

In the John Player League List A match against Surrey in 1969, his last season for Middlesex, he had the remarkable analysis of 8 overs, 4 maidens, 6 runs, 6 wickets. He took six of the first seven wickets to fall.

== Buckinghamshire ==
Hooker left Middlesex at the end of the 1969 season. He joined Buckinghamshire the following season, making his debut in the Minor Counties Championship against Berkshire. Hooker played Minor counties cricket for Buckinghamshire from 1970 to 1975, which included 48 Minor Counties Championship matches. His played his first List A match for Buckinghamshire in the 1970 Gillette Cup against Bedfordshire. He made 5 further List A appearances for the county, the last coming against Middlesex in the 1975 Gillette Cup. In List A cricket for Buckinghamshire, he scored 152 runs at an average of 38.00. He made his only List A half century against Hampshire, scoring 65. He took four wickets at an average of 46.25, with best figures of 2/30. Hooker retired from county cricket at the end of the 1975 season.

== Personal life ==
Hooker died on 22 February 2019, his 84th birthday.
