= Ken Suttle =

English cricketer

Personal information
- Full name: Kenneth George Suttle
- Born: 25 August 1928; Hammersmith, England
- Died: 25 March 2005 (aged 76); Port Louis, Mauritius
- Batting: Left-handed
- Bowling: Slow left-arm orthodox

Career statistics
Competition	First-class	List A
Matches	612	55
Runs scored	30225	1075
Batting average	31.09	22.39
100s/50s	49/156	2/3
Top score	204*	104
Balls bowled	21186	738
Wickets	266	16
Bowling average	32.80	28.18
5 wickets in innings	1	–
10 wickets in match	–	n/a
Best bowling	6-64	4-24
Catches/stumpings	384/3	12/-
- Source: CricketArchive

Ken Suttle
Personal information
- Position: Winger

Youth career
- 1947–1948: Worthing

Senior career*
Years	Team	Apps	(Gls)
1948	Chelsea	0	(0)
1948–1949	Brighton & Hove Albion	3	(0)
–	Chelmsford City		
- * Club domestic league appearances and goals

Kenneth George Suttle (25 August 1928 – 25 March 2005) was an English cricketer.

== Cricket career ==
Ken Suttle was primarily a left-handed batsman but was also a useful slow left-arm bowler. His first-class career with Sussex lasted from 1949 to 1971. He played in 612 first-class matches. This included an unbroken sequence of 423 consecutive County Championship matches between 1954 and 1969, which is still the record number.

Suttle was a quick-footed, unorthodox batsman, endlessly fidgeting at the crease between deliveries. He made 30225 first-class runs at an average of 31.09, with 49 centuries, reaching 1000 runs in 17 successive seasons from 1953 to 1969. In 1962 he scored more than 2000 runs in the County Championship, and made his highest score of 204 not out against Kent. He took 266 wickets at 32.80, with best innings figures of 6 for 64 against Worcestershire in 1970.

He played in 55 List A one-day matches, and was a member of the Sussex side which won the Gillette Cup in 1963 and 1964 (the first two years of the competition). He won the Man of the Match award in a quarter-final of the Gillette Cup in 1968, scoring 100 in a seven-run victory for Sussex over Northamptonshire.

He toured the West Indies with England in 1953-54, but never played in a Test. He stands equal third with Les Berry in the list of players with most first-class runs not to have played a Test.

After leaving Sussex he played for Suffolk for two seasons, ran an equipment shop, then coached at Christ's Hospital. He umpired a handful of first-class university matches in 1983.

== Outside cricket ==
Suttle was educated at Worthing High School. In the 1950s he played football as well as cricket. He made three first-team appearances as a winger for Brighton & Hove Albion FC in 1949. He was player/manager of Arundel F.C. when they won consecutive Sussex County League Division One titles in the 1957/58 and 1958/59 seasons.

He died in 2005 while on holiday in Mauritius.
