= Tony Buss =

English cricketer (1939–2026)

Personal information
- Full name: Antony Buss
- Born: 1 September 1939; Brightling, Sussex, England
- Died: 7 September 2026 (aged 87)
- Batting: Right-handed
- Bowling: Right-arm fast-medium
- Role: Bowler
- Relatives: Mike Buss (brother)

Domestic team information
- Years: Team
- 1958–1974: Sussex

Career statistics
Competition	FC	List A
Matches	310	103
Runs scored	4,415	448
Batting average	13.13	8.96
100s/50s	0/6	0/0
Top score	83	28
Balls bowled	52,665	5,437
Wickets	958	140
Bowling average	25.04	22.53
5 wickets in innings	44	1
10 wickets in match	3	–
Best bowling	8/23	5/53
Catches/stumpings	129/–	27/–
- Source: Cricinfo, 22 August 2025

Antony Buss (1 September 1939 – 7 September 2026) was an English cricketer who played for Sussex from 1958 to 1974. He appeared in 310 first-class matches as a right-arm fast-medium bowler and lower-order right-handed batsman. He took 958 wickets with a best performance of eight for 23, and scored 4,415 runs with a highest score of 83. Mike Buss, who also played for Sussex, was his brother. Buss died on 7 September 2026, aged 87.
