= Anthony Windows =

English cricketer (born 1942)

Personal information
- Full name: Anthony Robin Windows
- Born: 25 September 1942 (age 84); Bristol, England
- Batting: Right-handed
- Bowling: Right-arm medium pace
- Role: All-rounder

Domestic team information
- Years: Team
- 1960–1974: Gloucestershire
- 1962–1964: Cambridge University

Career statistics
Competition	FC	LA
Matches	149	7
Runs scored	3537	68
Batting average	17.00	9.71
100s/50s	0/8	0/0
Top score	82	32
Balls bowled	19,137	318
Wickets	286	7
Bowling average	29.04	30.14
5 wickets in innings	9	0
10 wickets in match	0	0
Best bowling	8/78	3/28
Catches/stumpings	42/0	1/0
- Source: Cricinfo, 1 August 2013

Anthony Robin Windows (born 25 September 1942) is an English former cricketer. He played for Gloucestershire from 1960 to 1974 (but with only occasional appearances after 1966), and for Cambridge University from 1962 to 1964.

Windows attended Clifton College before going up to Jesus College, Cambridge. He took 8 for 78 for Gloucestershire against the touring West Indians in 1966. He toured Pakistan with the MCC Under-25 side in 1966-67.
