= Laurie Gray =

English cricketer and Test match umpire

Personal information
- Full name: Lawrence Herbert Gray
- Born: 15 December 1915; Tottenham, Middlesex, England
- Died: 3 January 1983 (aged 67); Basildon, Essex, England
- Batting: Right-handed
- Bowling: Right-arm fast-medium
- Role: Bowler, umpire

Domestic team information
- Years: Team
- 1934–1951: Middlesex

Umpiring information
- Tests umpired: 2 (1955–1963)
- FC umpired: 446 (1952–1975)
- LA umpired: 43 (1963–1973)

Career statistics
Competition	First-class
Matches	219
Runs scored	901
Batting average	7.38
100s/50s	–/–
Top score	35*
Balls bowled	37,401
Wickets	637
Bowling average	25.13
5 wickets in innings	26
10 wickets in match	3
Best bowling	8/59
Catches/stumpings	125/–
- Source: CricketArchive, 20 November 2024

Lawrence Herbert Gray (1915–1983) was an English first-class cricketer and Test match umpire. Born in Tottenham in 1915, he played 219 matches for Middlesex as a right arm fast medium bowler between 1934 and 1951. He took 637 wickets at 25.13 with a best of 8 for 59. He took 5 wickets in an innings 26 times and 10 wickets in a match on 3 occasions. He then turned to umpiring, standing in the England v South Africa test at Lord's in 1955 and the England v West Indies match at Birmingham in 1963. He died in Essex in 1983.

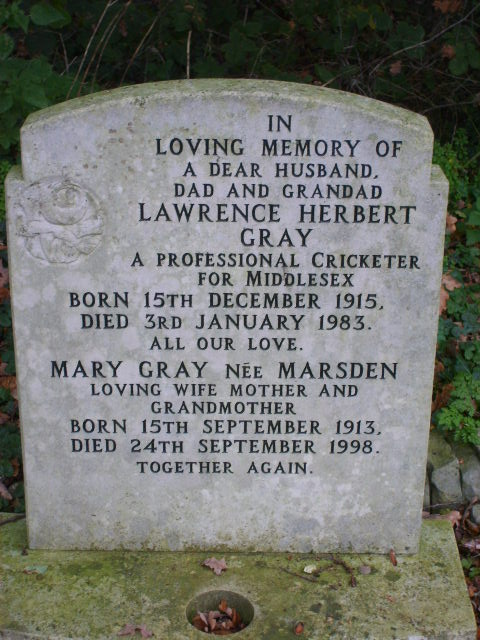
Gravestone

He was married to by Mary Gray née Marsden, who died in 1998.
