= Graham Saville =

English cricketer (born 1944)

Cricket information
- Batting: Right-handed
- Bowling: Leg-break and googly

Career statistics
| Competition | First-class | List A |
|---|---|---|
| Matches | 126 | 48 |
| Runs scored | 4,476 | 595 |
| Batting average | 23.68 | 18.03 |
| 100s/50s | 3/22 | 0/2 |
| Top score | 126* | 85* |
| Balls bowled | 102 | – |
| Wickets | 3 | – |
| Bowling average | 25.33 | – |
| 5 wickets in innings | 0 | – |
| 10 wickets in match | 0 | – |
| Best bowling | 2/30 | – |
| Catches/stumpings | 103/– | 22/– |
- Source: CricketArchive, 8 November 2022

Graham John Saville (born 5 February 1944) is a former English cricketer of the 1960s and 1970s. His main career was with Essex, whom he represented on 170 occasions at first-class or List A level, though he also turned out twice for Minor Counties in first-class games and twice for Norfolk in the Gillette Cup.

He was born in Leytonstone, Essex, and is the cousin of Graham Gooch.

He is a Trustee of the Hornsby Professional Cricketers' Fund charity.
