= Antony Durose =

English cricketer (born 1944)

Personal information
- Full name: Antony Jack Durose
- Born: 5 October 1944 (age 82); Dukinfield, Cheshire, England
- Batting: Right-handed
- Bowling: Right-arm fast-medium
- Role: Bowler

Domestic team information
- Years: Team
- 1964–1969: Northamptonshire

Career statistics
| Competition | First-class | List A |
|---|---|---|
| Matches | 70 | 11 |
| Runs scored | 447 | 23 |
| Batting average | 9.31 | 3.83 |
| 100s/50s | –/– | –/– |
| Top score | 30 | 10 |
| Balls bowled | 9,159 | 597 |
| Wickets | 150 | 18 |
| Bowling average | 26.90 | 20.83 |
| 5 wickets in innings | 2 | – |
| 10 wickets in match | 1 | – |
| Best bowling | 7/23 | 3/17 |
| Catches/stumpings | 24/– | 3/– |
- Source: CricketArchive, 11 January 2026

Antony Jack Durose (born 5 October 1944) is an English former cricketer who played for Northamptonshire from 1964 to 1969. He appeared in 70 first-class matches as a righthanded batsman who bowled right arm fast-medium pace. He scored 447 runs with a highest score of 30 and took 150 wickets with a best performance of seven for 23.
