= Carlton Forbes =

English cricketer

Personal information
- Full name: Carlton Forbes
- Born: 9 August 1936; Cross Roads, Kingston, Jamaica
- Died: 28 May 2009 (aged 72); Ocho Rios, Jamaica
- Nickname: Cha Cha
- Batting: Left-handed
- Bowling: Left-arm medium
- Role: Bowler

Domestic team information
- Years: Team
- 1959–1973: Nottinghamshire

Career statistics
Competition	First-class	List A
Matches	245	47
Runs scored	3605	152
Batting average	14.42	10.13
100s/50s	0/9	0/1
Top score	86	52*
Balls bowled	42745	2355
Wickets	707	59
Bowling average	25.44	24.89
5 wickets in innings	23	2
10 wickets in match	2	0
Best bowling	7/19	5/23
Catches/stumpings	146/–	14/–
- Source: CricketArchive, 8 June 2009

Carlton Forbes (9 August 1936 – 28 May 2009) was an English first-class cricketer.

Forbes was born in Jamaica and after moving over to England he started his first-class career with Nottinghamshire in 1959. He played with the county until 1973, during which time he also represented the International Cavaliers.

After moving to England, he initially played as the professional for Middlesbrough where he caught the eye of the Nottinghamshire selectors. He was invited to play for the county second team, as he was not qualified for championship cricket as the regulations then stood. He topped the bowling aggregates in his first season in the seconds, bowling left arm spin and batting in the middle order. He duly qualified for the championship side in 1961 and, having switched to left arm fast medium, took 59 wickets and completed 1,000 runs in a highly successful debut season. His batting fell away in later years, but he took a hundred wickets in 1965, 1966, and 1967, when he formed the bedrock of the Nottinghamshire attack.

He took over seven hundred first-class wickets at an economical 25.44 in all, including a haul of 7 for 19 against Kent in 1966, and scored 3,605 runs at 14.04. He was offered a new contract in 1970 but chose to play club cricket, making only occasional appearances for the county. He returned for a last full season in 1973 and, after his retirement, opened a night club 'The New Calypso' in Nottingham, before moving back to Jamaica.
