= Eric Russell (cricketer) =

Scottish cricketer (1936–2026)

Personal information
- Full name: William Eric Russell
- Born: 3 July 1936; Dumbarton, Scotland
- Died: 28 January 2026 (aged 89)
- Batting: Right-handed
- Bowling: Right-arm medium

International information
- National side: England
- Test debut: 21 October 1961 v Pakistan
- Last Test: 27 July 1967 v Pakistan

Domestic team information
- Years: Team
- 1956–1972: Middlesex
- 1976–1977: Berkshire

Career statistics
Competition	Test	FC	LA
Matches	10	448	58
Runs scored	362	25,525	1,390
Batting average	21.29	34.87	26.22
100s/50s	0/2	41/134	1/9
Top score	70	193	123
Balls bowled	144	1,938	12
Wickets	0	22	0
Bowling average	–	45.13	–
5 wickets in innings	–	0	–
10 wickets in match	–	0	–
Best bowling	–	3/20	–
Catches/stumpings	4/–	304/–	22/–
- Source: ESPNcricinfo, 3 February 2022

William Eric Russell (3 July 1936 – 28 January 2026) was a Scottish cricketer. He was an opening batsman who played for Middlesex County Cricket Club from 1956 to 1972, and played in ten Test matches for England between 1961 and 1967.

The cricket correspondent, Colin Bateman, commented, "a smooth, assured opening batsman, Eric Russell suffered from never getting a settled sequence in the England team. His 10 Tests were spread over seven series and five countries, and two half-centuries in 18 innings did not do his ability justice."

== Biography ==
Russell was a stylish right-hander, whose international appearances were limited by injury and the dominance of Geoff Boycott and John Edrich. He played ten Tests against six countries and toured three times, but could never establish himself in the England side.

He joined Middlesex in 1956 at the age of 20, and played over 400 games for them, recording over 25,000 first-class runs with 41 centuries, and a career best of 193 against Hampshire at Bournemouth in 1964. He scored 1,000 runs in a season 13 times, a testament to his reliability, and topped 2,000 on three occasions, his best return being his 2,343 at 45.92 in 1964. He also took 22 wickets with his occasional medium pacers and held 304 catches.

After leaving Middlesex, Russell coached at Shiplake College, played Minor Counties cricket for Berkshire and later played a role in the development of MCC's Shenley Cricket Centre.

Russell died on 28 January 2026, at the age of 89.

== See also ==
- List of Test cricketers born in non-Test playing nations
