= List of Marylebone Cricket Club players (1946–1977) =

Cricketers who debuted for Marylebone Cricket Club (MCC) in first-class matches during the post-war period from 1946 until the end of the 1977 season, when it was decided that MCC would no longer organise the England cricket team, are as follows. Many of the players represented MCC after 1977 but they are only listed here, as it was in this period that they made their MCC debuts.

MCC have rarely taken part in List A matches (a total of fifteen between 1971 and 2008). The club played all its home matches at its Lord's venue in north London. The majority of MCC players in this period were contracted to county clubs and appeared for MCC by invitation. Some players were from other countries. For much of the 20th century until 1976–1977, MCC organised international tours in which the England cricket team played Test matches. The players selected for these tours were contracted to MCC for the duration and appearances by them in non-Tests on the tour were for MCC, therefore all such players are included in this list. MCC teams have always operated at all levels of the sport and players who represented the club in minor cricket only are out of scope here.

The details are the player's usual name followed by the span of years in which he was active as an MCC player in important matches (the span may include years in which he played only in minor matches for MCC and/or years in which he did not represent MCC in any matches) and then his name is given as it appears on match scorecards (e.g., surname preceded by all initials), followed by the club or team with which he was mostly associated (this may be MCC itself). Players who have taken part in Test cricket have their names highlighted in bold text and the names of players who represented MCC in a List A match are preceded by the † symbol.

== A ==
- David Acfield (1973/74–1974) : D. L. Acfield (Essex). Tours: East Africa (1973/74).
- Michael Ainsworth (1950) : M. L. Y. Ainsworth (Worcestershire)
- **David Allen** (1959/60–1968) : D. A. Allen (Gloucestershire). Tours: West Indies (1959/60); New Zealand (1960/61); India, Pakistan & Ceylon (1961/62); Australia (1962/63); South Africa (1964/65); Australia & New Zealand (1965/66).
- Michael Allen (1958–1961) : M. H. J. Allen (Northamptonshire, Derbyshire)
- Anthony Allom (1960) : A. T. C. Allom (Surrey)
- **† Dennis Amiss** (1967–1976/77) : D. L. Amiss (Warwickshire). Tours: India, Pakistan & Sri Lanka (1972/73); West Indies (1973/74); Australia & New Zealand (1974/75); India, Sri Lanka & Australia (1976/77).
- **Keith Andrew** (1954–1963) : K. V. Andrew (Northamptonshire). Tours: Australia & New Zealand (1954/55); West Indies (1959/60).
- Luke White, 5th Baron Annaly (1950) : Baron Annaly (Middlesex)
- Francis Appleyard (1946–1950) : F. Appleyard (Essex)
- **Bob Appleyard** (1954/55–1958) : R. Appleyard (Yorkshire). Tours: Australia & New Zealand (1954/55).
- **Geoff Arnold** (1969/70–1975) : G. G. Arnold (Surrey). Tours: Ceylon (1969/70); India, Pakistan & Sri Lanka (1972/73); West Indies (1973/74); Australia & New Zealand (1974/75).
- **Bill Athey** (1977–1985) : C. W. J. Athey (Yorkshire, Gloucestershire, Sussex)
- Graham Atkinson (1959–1963) : G. Atkinson (Somerset, Lancashire)

== B ==
- J. A. Bailey (1961–1967) : J. A. Bailey (Essex)
- Raymond Bailey (1965) : R. R. Bailey (Northamptonshire)
- **Trevor Bailey** (1949–1964) : T. E. Bailey (Essex). Tours: Australia & New Zealand (1950/51); West Indies (1953/54); Australia & New Zealand (1954/55); South Africa (1956/57); Australia & New Zealand (1958/59).
- **David Bairstow** (1974–1980) : D. L. Bairstow (Yorkshire)
- Dennis Baldry (1956–1959) : D. O. Baldry (Middlesex, Hampshire)
- Jack Bannister (1955–1961) : J. D. Bannister (Warwickshire)
- **Bob Barber** (1960–1968) : R. W. Barber (Lancashire, Warwickshire). Tours: New Zealand (1960/61); India, Pakistan & Ceylon (1961/62); South Africa (1964/65); Australia (1965/66).
- John Barclay (1977) : J. R. T. Barclay (Sussex)
- Gordon Barker (1956–1967) : G. Barker (Essex)
- **† Graham Barlow** (1976/77–1977) : G. D. Barlow (Middlesex). Tours: India, Sri Lanka & Australia (1976/77).
- **Ben Barnett** (1952) : B. A. Barnett (Victoria)
- Des Barrick (1953–1957) : D. W. Barrick (Northamptonshire)
- **Ken Barrington** (1955–1967/68) : K. F. Barrington (Surrey). Tours: Pakistan (1955/56); West Indies (1959/60); India, Pakistan & Ceylon (1961/62); Australia & New Zealand (1962/63); India (1963/64); South Africa (1964/65); Australia (1965/66); West Indies (1967/68).
- John Bartlett (1950–1952) : J. N. Bartlett (Sussex). Tours: Canada (1951).
- Michael Barton (1949–1950) : M. R. Barton (Surrey)
- Ian Bedford (1956–1966) : P. I. Bedford (Middlesex)
- **Alec Bedser** (1946/47–1954/55) : A. V. Bedser (Surrey). Tours: Australia & New Zealand (1946/47); South Africa (1948/49); Australia & New Zealand (1950/51); Australia & New Zealand (1954/55).
- Eric Bedser (1947–1962) : E. A. Bedser (Surrey). Tours: Australia & New Zealand (1950/51).
- Ronald Bell (1959) : R. V. Bell (Middlesex, Sussex)
- Don Bennett (1954–1968) : D. Bennett (Middlesex)
- Richard Bernard (1961–1964) : J. R. Bernard (Gloucestershire)
- **Bob Berry** (1950–1955) : R. Berry (Lancashire, Worcestershire, Derbyshire). Tours: Australia & New Zealand (1950/51).
- Donald Bick (1967) : D. A. Bick (Middlesex)
- **Jimmy Binks** (1961/62–1964) : J. G. Binks (Yorkshire). Tours: India, Pakistan & Ceylon (1961/62); India (1963/64).
- Ronald Bird (1953–1958) : R. E. Bird (Worcestershire)
- **† Jack Birkenshaw** (1968–1973/74) : J. Birkenshaw (Yorkshire, Leicestershire). Tours: India, Pakistan & Sri Lanka (1972/73); West Indies (1973/74).
- David Blake (1952–1961) : D. E. Blake (Hampshire)
- Bill Blenkiron (1970) : W. Blenkiron (Warwickshire)
- Nigel Bloy (1954–1958) : N. C. F. Bloy (Oxford University)
- **Brian Bolus** (1963–1970) : J. B. Bolus (Yorkshire, Nottinghamshire, Derbyshire). Tours: India (1963/64).
- Jack Bond (1962) : J. D. Bond (Lancashire)
- Roy Booth (1959) : R. Booth (Worcestershire)
- **Chandu Borde** (1966) : C. G. Borde (Maharashtra)
- Brian Boshier (1961) : B. S. Boshier (Leicestershire)
- **Ian Botham** (1977–1980) : I. T. Botham (Somerset, Worcestershire, Durham)
- Richard Bowman (1960–1964) : R. Bowman (Lancashire)
- **Keith Boyce** (1970) : K. D. Boyce (Barbados, Essex)
- **† Geoffrey Boycott** (1964–1974) : G. Boycott (Yorkshire). Tours: Ceylon (1969/70); South Africa (1964/65); Australia & New Zealand (1965/66); West Indies (1967/68); Australia (1970/71); West Indies (1973/74).
- **† Mike Brearley** (1964/65–1979) : J. M. Brearley (Middlesex). Tours: South Africa (1964/65); East Africa (1973/74); India, Sri Lanka & Australia (1976/77).
- **Don Brennan** (1950–1964) : D. V. Brennan (Yorkshire). Tours: India, Pakistan & Ceylon (1951/52).
- Basil Bridge (1961) : W. B. Bridge (Warwickshire)
- John Bridger (1946) : J. R. Bridger (Hampshire)
- Vince Broderick (1949) : V. Broderick (Northamptonshire)
- Arthur Brodhurst (1951) : A. H. Brodhurst (Gloucestershire). Tours: Canada (1951).
- **Dennis Brookes** (1947–1947/48) : D. Brookes (Northamptonshire). Tours: West Indies (1947/48).
- **Alan Brown** (1959–1961/62) : A. Brown (Kent). Tours: India, Pakistan & Ceylon (1961/62).
- Tony Brown (1960) : A. S. Brown (Gloucestershire)
- **David J. Brown** (1964/65–1969) : D. J. Brown (Warwickshire). Tours: South Africa (1964/65); Australia (1965/66); West Indies (1967/68); Pakistan & Ceylon (1968/69).
- Tolly Burnett (1951) : A. C. Burnett (Glamorgan)
- Michael Bushby (1960–1966) : M. H. Bushby (Cambridge University)
- Tony Buss (1968) : A. Buss (Sussex)
- Mike Buss (1968) : M. A. Buss (Sussex)
- **Alan Butcher** (1976–1982) : A. R. Butcher (Surrey)
- **Harold Butler** (1947/48) : H. J. Butler (Nottinghamshire). Tours: West Indies (1947/48).

== C ==
- Iain Campbell (1951–1954) : I. P. Campbell (Kent). Tours: Canada (1951).
- Victor Cannings (1959) : V. H. D. Cannings (Warwickshire, Hampshire)
- Bob Caple (1958) : R. G. Caple (Middlesex, Hampshire)
- Anthony Card (1955–1958) : A. J. Card (MCC)
- **Donald Carr** (1949–1972/73) : D. B. Carr (Derbyshire). Tours: India, Pakistan & Ceylon (1951/52); Pakistan (1955/56); India, Pakistan & Sri Lanka (1972/73).
- Phil Carrick (1976) : P. Carrick (Yorkshire)
- Bob Carter (1973) : R. G. M. Carter (Worcestershire)
- **Tom Cartwright** (1963/64–1973/74) : T. W. Cartwright (Warwickshire, Somerset, Glamorgan). Tours: East Africa (1963/64); South Africa (1964/65); East Africa (1973/74).
- Laurence Champniss (1973/74) : L. J. Champniss (Buckinghamshire). Tours: East Africa (1973/74).
- George Chesterton (1950–1966) : G. H. Chesterton (Worcestershire)
- Ted Clark (1960–1973/74) : E. A. Clark (Middlesex). Tours: East Africa (1973/74).
- Tom Clark (1957) : T. H. Clark (Surrey)
- **Bertie Clarke** (1955–1961) : C. B. Clarke (Barbados, Northamptonshire, Essex)
- Robert Clarke (1950) : R. W. Clarke (Northamptonshire)
- Geoff Clayton (1960) : G. Clayton (Lancashire, Somerset)
- **Brian Close** (1950/51–1967) : D. B. Close (Yorkshire). Tours: Australia & New Zealand (1950/51); Pakistan (1955/56).
- **Len Coldwell** (1962/63) : L. J. Coldwell (Worcestershire). Tours: Australia & New Zealand (1962/63).
- Bill Coldwell (1954–1955) : W. R. Coldwell (MCC)
- Leslie Compton (1947) : L. H. Compton (Middlesex)
- Bernie Constable (1951) : B. Constable (Surrey)
- **Sam Cook** (1947) : C. Cook (Gloucestershire)
- Geoffrey Cook (1959–1960) : G. W. Cook (Kent)
- Jeremy Cook (1961–1963) : J. Cook (MCC)
- **† Geoff Cope** (1976/77) : G. A. Cope (Yorkshire). Tours: India, Sri Lanka & Australia (1976/77).
- **† Bob Cottam** (1964–1973) : R. M. H. Cottam (Hampshire, Northamptonshire). Tours: Pakistan & Ceylon (1968/69); India, Pakistan & Sri Lanka (1972/73).
- John Cotton (1960–1968) : J. Cotton (Nottinghamshire, Leicestershire)
- Michael Cowan (1955/56) : M. J. Cowan (Yorkshire). Tours: Pakistan (1955/56).
- **† Colin Cowdrey** (1952–1975) : M. C. Cowdrey (Kent). Tours: Australia & New Zealand (1954/55); South Africa (1956/57); Australia & New Zealand (1958/59); West Indies (1959/60); Australia & New Zealand (1962/63); India (1963/64); Australia & New Zealand (1965/66); West Indies (1967/68); Pakistan & Ceylon (1968/69); Australia (1970/71); Australia & New Zealand (1974/75).
- **Bob Cowper** (1966) : R. M. Cowper (Victoria, Western Australia)
- Alan Coxon (1958) : A. J. Coxon (Oxford University)
- Peter Cranmer (1955–1959) : P. Cranmer (Warwickshire)
- **Ken Cranston** (1947–1949) : K. Cranston (Lancashire). Tours: West Indies (1947/48).
- **Jack Crapp** (1948/49–1955) : J. F. Crapp (Gloucestershire). Tours: South Africa (1948/49).
- Maurice Crouch (1950–1952) : M. A. Crouch (Cambridgeshire)
- Brian Crump (1961) : B. S. Crump (Northamptonshire)

== D ==
- William Davidson (1956) : W. W. Davidson (Sussex)
- Haydn Davies (1947–1948) : H. G. Davies (Glamorgan)
- Anthony Davis (1967) : A. T. Davis (Berkshire)
- George Dawkes (1948–1949) : G. O. Dawkes (Leicestershire, Derbyshire)
- Alan Day (1968) : A. R. Day (Hertfordshire, Berkshire)
- Kenneth Day (1958) : K. B. Day (Middlesex)
- John Deighton (1948–1954) : J. H. G. Deighton (Lancashire)
- Peter Delisle (1956–1957) : G. P. S. Delisle (Middlesex)
- **† Mike Denness** (1966–1974/75) : M. H. Denness (Kent). Tours: India, Pakistan & Sri Lanka (1972/73); West Indies (1973/74); Australia & New Zealand (1974/75).
- Roger Dermont (1967) : R. W. A. Dermont (Hertfordshire)
- **John Dewes** (1948–1950/51) : J. G. Dewes (Middlesex). Tours: Australia & New Zealand (1950/51).
- George Dews (1954) : G. Dews (Worcestershire)
- **Ted Dexter** (1957–1965) : E. R. Dexter (Sussex). Tours: Australia & New Zealand (1958/59); West Indies (1959/60); India, Pakistan & Ceylon (1961/62); Australia (1962/63); South Africa (1964/65).
- Alan Dixon (1961–1973/74) : A. L. Dixon (Kent). Tours: East Africa (1973/74).
- Dickie Dodds (1947–1961) : T. C. Dodds (Essex)
- **Hubert Doggart** (1951–1961) : G. H. G. Doggart (Sussex)
- Len Dolding (1950–1951) : D. L. Dolding (Middlesex)
- **† Basil D'Oliveira** (1964–1970/71) : B. L. D'Oliveira (Worcestershire). Tours: West Indies (1967/68); Pakistan & Ceylon (1968/69); Australia (1970/71).
- **Tom Dollery** (1955) : H. E. Dollery (Warwickshire)
- **Martin Donnelly** (1947–1948) : M. P. Donnelly (Wellington, Canterbury, Oxford University, Middlesex, Warwickshire)
- Alan Dowding (1955–1957) : A. L. Dowding (Oxford University)
- George Downton (1959) : G. C. Downton (Kent)
- Colin Drybrough (1967) : C. D. Drybrough (Middlesex)
- Alan Duff (1960–1968) : A. R. Duff (Worcestershire)
- Neil Durden-Smith (1967) : N. Durden-Smith (MCC)
- John Dye (1965) : J. C. J. Dye (Northamptonshire)
- Martin Dyson (1968) : E. M. Dyson (Oxford University)

== E ==
- Desmond Eagar (1952–1958) : E. D. R. Eagar (Hampshire, Gloucestershire)
- Michael Eagar (1966) : M. A. Eagar (Gloucestershire)
- Jim Eaglestone (1947) : J. T. Eaglestone (Middlesex, Glamorgan)
- David Eames (1958) : D. G. R. Eames (MCC)
- Ray East (1973) : R. E. East (Essex)
- **† Phil Edmonds** (1974–1992) : P. H. Edmonds (Middlesex)
- **† John Edrich** (1960–1974/75) : J. H. Edrich (Surrey). Tours: India (1963/64); Australia & New Zealand (1965/66); West Indies (1967/68); Pakistan & Ceylon (1968/69); Australia (1970/71); Australia & New Zealand (1974/75).
- Mike Edwards (1973) : M. J. Edwards (Surrey)
- Peter Ellis (1953) : P. M. Ellis (MCC)
- **George Emmett** (1957) : G. M. Emmett (Gloucestershire)
- **Russell Endean** (1963–1964) : W. R. Endean (Transvaal)
- **Godfrey Evans** (1946/47–1963) : T. G. Evans (Kent). Tours: Australia & New Zealand (1946/47); West Indies (1947/48); South Africa (1948/49); Australia & New Zealand (1950/51); West Indies (1953/54); Australia & New Zealand (1954/55); South Africa (1956/57); Australia & New Zealand (1958/59).

== F ==
- Alan Fairbairn (1948) : A. Fairbairn (Middlesex)
- David Fasken (1956–1959) : D. K. Fasken (Oxford University)
- **Fazal Mahmood** (1961) : Fazal Mahmood (Northern India, Punjab (Pakistan), Lahore)
- **Jonathan Fellows-Smith** (1956) : J. P. Fellows-Smith (Transvaal, Northamptonshire)
- Robert Fetherstonhaugh (1956) : C. B. R. Fetherstonhaugh (Devon)
- Jack Firth (1954) : J. Firth (Yorkshire, Leicestershire)
- **Jack Flavell** (1962–1963) : J. A. Flavell (Worcestershire)
- **† Keith Fletcher** (1963–1982) : K. W. R. Fletcher (Essex). Tours: Ceylon (1969/70); Pakistan & Ceylon (1968/69); Australia (1970/71); India, Pakistan & Sri Lanka (1972/73); West Indies (1973/74); Australia & New Zealand (1974/75); India, Sri Lanka & Australia (1976/77).
- Graham Frost (1968) : G. Frost ( Nottinghamshire)

== G ==
- Bob Gale (1957–1968) : R. A. Gale (Middlesex)
- David Gibson (1966) : D. Gibson (Surrey)
- Ian Gibson (1961) : I. Gibson (Derbyshire)
- **† Norman Gifford** (1962–1977) : N. Gifford (Worcestershire). Tours: India, Pakistan & Sri Lanka (1972/73).
- Keith Gillhouley (1963) : K. Gillhouley (Yorkshire, Nottinghamshire)
- Richard Gilliat (1968–1976) : R. M. C. Gilliat (Hampshire)
- **Cliff Gladwin** (1948/49–1952) : C. Gladwin (Derbyshire). Tours: South Africa (1948/49).
- Mervin Glennie (1947) : M. S. Glennie (Cambridge University)
- **John Goddard** (1957) : J. D. C. Goddard (Barbados)
- **Trevor Goddard** (1962) : T. L. Goddard (Natal, Northerns)
- **Gerry Gomez** (1957) : G. E. Gomez (Trinidad and Tobago)
- **Graham Gooch** (1975–2000) : G. A. Gooch (Essex)
- Gamini Goonesena (1957–1967) : G. Goonesena (Nottinghamshire)
- **† David Gower** (1977–1990) : D. I. Gower (Leicestershire, Hampshire)
- Norman Graham (1968) : J. N. Graham (Kent)
- **Tom Graveney** (1951/52–1968/69) : T. W. Graveney (Gloucestershire, Worcestershire). Tours: India, Pakistan & Ceylon (1951/52); West Indies (1953/54); Australia & New Zealand (1954/55); Australia & New Zealand (1958/59); Australia (1962/63); West Indies (1967/68); Pakistan & Ceylon (1968/69).
- Jimmy Gray (1954–1959) : J. R. Gray (Hampshire)
- David Green (1965–1970) : D. M. Green (Lancashire, Gloucestershire)
- **Tommy Greenhough** (1959–1961) : T. Greenhough (Lancashire). Tours: West Indies (1959/60).
- Bill Greensmith (1957–1960) : W. T. Greensmith (Essex)
- **† Tony Greig** (1967–1976/77) : A. W. Greig (Sussex). Tours: India, Pakistan & Sri Lanka (1972/73); West Indies (1973/74); Australia & New Zealand (1974/75); India, Sri Lanka & Australia (1976/77).
- Mike Griffith (1966–1973/74) : M. G. Griffith (Sussex). Tours: East Africa (1973/74).
- Mike Groves (1967) : M. G. M. Groves (Somerset)

== H ==
- David Halfyard (1959) : D. J. Halfyard (Kent, Nottinghamshire)
- John Hall (1959–1961) : J. K. Hall (Surrey, Sussex)
- Tom Hall (1951–1955) : T. A. Hall (Derbyshire, Somerset)
- Maurice Hallam (1957–1967) : M. R. Hallam (Leicestershire)
- Harry Halliday (1952) : H. Halliday (Yorkshire)
- **† John Hampshire** (1963–1970/71) : J. H. Hampshire (Yorkshire). Tours: Ceylon (1969/70); Australia (1970/71).
- Roger Harman (1964–1965) : R. Harman (Surrey)
- William Harrington (1946–1951) : W. J. R. Harrington (Middlesex)
- Pasty Harris (1973) : M. J. Harris (Nottinghamshire, Middlesex)
- Leo Harrison (1954–1956) : L. Harrison (Hampshire)
- George Hartley (1946) : G. E. Hartley (MCC)
- John Harvey (1961–1967) : J. F. Harvey (Derbyshire)
- Peter Harvey (1951) : P. F. Harvey (Nottinghamshire)
- **† Frank Hayes** (1971–1978) : F. C. Hayes (Lancashire). Tours: West Indies (1973/74).
- Denis Haynes (1956) : D. M. Haynes (Staffordshire)
- William Hayward (1954) : W. I. D. Hayward (Cambridge University)
- George Heane (1946–1948) : G. F. H. Heane (Nottinghamshire)
- Bernard Heighes (1967) : B. R. Heighes (MCC)
- **Mike Hendrick** (1973/74–1979) : M. Hendrick (Derbyshire). Tours: West Indies (1973/74); Australia & New Zealand (1974/75).
- **Ken Higgs** (1960–1969) : K. Higgs (Lancashire, Leicestershire). Tours: Australia & New Zealand (1965/66); West Indies (1967/68).
- Maurice Hill (1964) : M. Hill (Derbyshire, Somerset)
- Norman Hill (1960–1962) : N. W. Hill (Nottinghamshire)
- **Malcolm Hilton** (1949–1957) : M. J. Hilton (Lancashire). Tours: India, Pakistan & Ceylon (1951/52).
- **Robin Hobbs** (1963/64–1970) : R. N. S. Hobbs (Essex, Glamorgan). Tours: East Africa (1963/64); South Africa (1964/65); West Indies (1967/68); Pakistan & Ceylon (1968/69).
- Norman Horner (1955) : N. F. Horner (Yorkshire, Warwickshire)
- Dick Horsfall (1950) : R. Horsfall (Essex, Glamorgan)
- **Martin Horton** (1959–1964) : M. J. Horton (Worcestershire)
- Barry Howard (1949) : B. J. Howard (Lancashire)
- **Nigel Howard** (1949–1954) : N. D. Howard (Lancashire). Tours: India, Pakistan & Ceylon (1951/52).
- Christopher Howland (1961–1968) : C. B. Howland (Sussex, Kent)
- **Dick Howorth** (1947–1947/48) : R. Howorth (Worcestershire). Tours: West Indies (1947/48).
- David Hughes (1971–1972) : D. P. Hughes (Lancashire)
- Bob Hurst (1956–1961) : R. J. Hurst (Middlesex)
- John Hutton (1973/74) : J. L. Hutton (MCC). Tours: East Africa (1973/74).
- **Richard Hutton** (1965–1971) : R. A. Hutton (Yorkshire)

== I ==
- **Jack Ikin** (1946/47–1964) : J. T. Ikin (Lancashire). Tours: Australia & New Zealand (1946/47); West Indies (1947/48).
- **† Ray Illingworth** (1955–1972) : R. Illingworth (Yorkshire, Leicestershire). Tours: West Indies (1959/60); Australia & New Zealand (1962/63); Australia (1970/71).
- Stanley Ilsley (1956) : S. T. Ilsley (MCC)
- Colin Ingleby-Mackenzie (1956–1962) : A. C. D. Ingleby-Mackenzie (Hampshire)
- Clive Inman (1967) : C. C. Inman (Leicestershire)
- **Doug Insole** (1950–1960) : D. J. Insole (Essex). Tours: South Africa (1956/57).
- **Intikhab Alam** (1973) : Intikhab Alam (Karachi, Surrey)

== J ==
- **Robin Jackman** (1973–1981) : R. D. Jackman (Surrey)
- Brian Jackson (1967) : A. B. Jackson (Derbyshire)
- Freddie Jakeman (1952) : F. Jakeman (Yorkshire, Northamptonshire)
- Michael James (1961) : R. M. James (Cambridge University)
- **John Jameson** (1963–1973/74) : J. A. Jameson (Warwickshire). Tours: West Indies (1973/74).
- Richard Jefferson (1963) : R. I. Jefferson (Surrey)
- **Roly Jenkins** (1948/49–1953) : R. O. Jenkins (Worcestershire). Tours: South Africa (1948/49).
- Arthur Jepson (1948) : A. Jepson (Nottinghamshire)
- Graham Johnson (1974–1975) : G. W. Johnson (Kent)
- Laurence Johnson (1963/64–1967) : L. A. Johnson (Northamptonshire). Tours: East Africa (1963/64).
- Allan Jones (1977) : A. A. Jones (Sussex, Somerset, Middlesex, Glamorgan)
- **Alan Jones** (1965–1969/70) : A. Jones (Glamorgan). Tours: Ceylon (1969/70).
- **Jeff Jones** (1963/64–1968) : I. J. Jones (Glamorgan). Tours: East Africa (1963/64); India (1963/64); Australia (1965/66); West Indies (1967/68).
- Peter Jones (1961) : P. H. Jones (Kent)
- David Jowett (1954–1958) : D. C. P. R. Jowett (Oxford University)

== K ==
- Michael Keeling (1948) : M. E. A. Keeling (Oxford University)
- Geoffrey Keighley (1948–1951) : W. G. Keighley (Yorkshire). Tours: Canada (1951).
- **Don Kenyon** (1950–1955) : D. Kenyon (Worcestershire). Tours: India, Pakistan & Ceylon (1951/52).
- Simon Kimmins (1959) : S. E. A. Kimmins (Kent)
- **Barry Knight** (1960–1969) : B. R. Knight (Essex). Tours: India, Pakistan & Ceylon (1961/62); Australia & New Zealand (1962/63); India (1963/64); Australia & New Zealand (1965/66).
- Roger Knight (1973/74–1989) : R. D. V. Knight (Surrey, Gloucestershire, Sussex). Tours: East Africa (1973/74).
- William Knightley-Smith (1956–1959) : W. Knightley-Smith (Gloucestershire)
- **† Alan Knott** (1965–1976/77) : A. P. E. Knott (Kent). Tours: West Indies (1967/68); Pakistan & Ceylon (1968/69); Australia (1970/71); India, Pakistan & Sri Lanka (1972/73); West Indies (1973/74); Australia & New Zealand (1974/75); India, Sri Lanka & Australia (1976/77).
- Charles Knott (1951–1957) : C. J. Knott (Hampshire)

== L ==
- **Jim Laker** (1947/48–1958/59) : J. C. Laker (Surrey). Tours: West Indies (1947/48); West Indies (1953/54); South Africa (1956/57); Australia & New Zealand (1958/59).
- Brian Langford (1959–1966) : B. A. Langford (Somerset)
- Richard Langridge (1963/64) : R. J. Langridge (Sussex). Tours: East Africa (1963/64).
- **David Larter** (1960/61–1965/66) : J. D. F. Larter (Northamptonshire). Tours: New Zealand (1960/61); Australia (1962/63); East Africa (1963/64); India (1963/64); Australia (1965/66).
- Harry Latchman (1969) : A. H. Latchman (Middlesex, Nottinghamshire)
- Alan Lavers (1949) : A. B. Lavers (Essex)
- Michael Laws (1949–1950) : M. L. Laws (Middlesex)
- **Eddie Leadbeater** (1951/52–1958) : E. Leadbeater (Yorkshire, Warwickshire). Tours: India, Pakistan & Ceylon (1951/52).
- Stuart Leary (1965) : S. E. Leary (Kent)
- Peter Lee (1977) : P. G. Lee (Northamptonshire, Lancashire)
- Antony Legard (1952) : A. R. Legard (Worcestershire)
- Brian Lemmy (1958) : B. A. Lemmy (Staffordshire)
- **† John Lever** (1973–1990) : J. K. Lever (Essex). Tours: India, Sri Lanka & Australia (1976/77).
- **† Peter Lever** (1970/71–1974/75) : P. Lever (Lancashire). Tours: Australia (1970/71); Australia & New Zealand (1974/75).
- **† Tony Lewis** (1963–1974) : A. R. Lewis (Glamorgan). Tours: Ceylon (1969/70); India, Pakistan & Sri Lanka (1972/73).
- Jock Livingston (1964) : L. Livingston (New South Wales, Northamptonshire)
- **David Lloyd** (1973–1976) : D. Lloyd (Lancashire). Tours: Australia & New Zealand (1974/75).
- **Peter Loader** (1954/55–1963) : P. J. Loader (Surrey). Tours: Australia & New Zealand (1954/55); South Africa (1956/57); Australia & New Zealand (1958/59).
- Bernard Lock (1955) : B. H. Lock (Kent)
- **Tony Lock** (1951–1967/68) : G. A. R. Lock (Surrey). Tours: West Indies (1953/54); Pakistan (1955/56); South Africa (1956/57); Australia & New Zealand (1958/59); India, Pakistan & Ceylon (1961/62); West Indies (1967/68).
- Ian Lomax (1963–1965) : I. R. Lomax (Somerset)
- Arnold Long (1963–1973) : A. Long (Surrey)
- **Frank Lowson** (1951/52) : F. A. Lowson (Yorkshire). Tours: India, Pakistan & Ceylon (1951/52).
- **† Brian Luckhurst** (1965–1974/75) : B. W. Luckhurst (Kent). Tours: Australia (1970/71); Australia & New Zealand (1974/75).
- Richard Lumb (1975–1980) : R. G. Lumb (Yorkshire)
- John Lyon (1977) : J. Lyon (Lancashire)
- Peter Stanley Lyons (1964) (MCC)

== M ==
- Tony Mallett (1946–1954) : A. W. H. Mallett (Kent). Tours: Canada (1951).
- **George Mann** (1948–1954) : F. G. Mann (Middlesex). Tours: South Africa (1948/49).
- John Manners (1953) : J. E. Manners (Hampshire)
- Jack Manning (1960) : J. S. Manning (South Australia, Northamptonshire)
- Robin Marlar (1952–1958) : R. G. Marlar (Sussex)
- Peter Marner (1956–1961) : P. T. Marner (Lancashire, Leicestershire)
- Jack Marshall (1956) : J. M. A. Marshall (Warwickshire)
- **Roy Marshall** (1959–1963) : R. E. Marshall (Barbados, Hampshire)
- Algernon Marsham (1946) : A. J. B. Marsham (Kent)
- **Jack Martin** (1947–1953) : J. W. Martin (Kent)
- Kenneth Mathews (1955) : K. P. A. Mathews (Sussex)
- Ron Maudsley (1950) : R. H. Maudsley (Warwickshire)
- **Peter May** (1951–1959/60) : P. B. H. May (Surrey). Tours: West Indies (1953/54); Australia & New Zealand (1954/55); South Africa (1956/57); Australia & New Zealand (1958/59); West Indies (1959/60).
- Keith McAdam (1967) : K. P. W. J. McAdam (Cambridge University)
- **Jim McConnon** (1954/55) : J. E. McConnon (Glamorgan). Tours: Australia & New Zealand (1954/55).
- Alastair McCorquodale (1948) : A. McCorquodale (Middlesex)
- **Arthur McIntyre** (1950/51) : A. J. W. McIntyre (Surrey). Tours: Australia & New Zealand (1950/51).
- John McMahon (1949–1951) : J. W. J. McMahon (Surrey, Somerset)
- Mike Melluish (1959) : M. E. L. Melluish (Middlesex)
- Michael Mence (1966) : M. D. Mence (Warwickshire, Gloucestershire)
- Derek Mendl (1951) : D. F. Mendl (MCC)
- Jack Mendl (1957) : J. F. Mendl (MCC)
- Stanley Metcalfe (1961) : S. G. Metcalfe (Oxford University)
- **Colin Milburn** (1963/64–1969) : C. Milburn (Northamptonshire). Tours: East Africa (1963/64); West Indies (1967/68).
- **† Geoff Miller** (1976/77–1982) : G. Miller (Derbyshire). Tours: India, Sri Lanka & Australia (1976/77).
- **Keith Miller** (1959) : K. R. Miller (Victoria, New South Wales, Nottinghamshire)
- Roger Miller (1959) : R. S. Miller (Dorset)
- **Geoff Millman** (1960–1962) : G. Millman (Nottinghamshire). Tours: India & Pakistan (1961/62).
- **Arthur Milton** (1954–1968) : C. A. Milton (Gloucestershire). Tours: Australia & New Zealand (1958/59).
- David Mordaunt (1964) : D. J. Mordaunt (Sussex)
- Derek Morgan (1953–1967) : D. C. Morgan (Derbyshire)
- Michael Morgan (1957) : M. N. Morgan (Cambridge University)
- **John Mortimore** (1958/59–1967) : J. B. Mortimore (Gloucestershire). Tours: Australia & New Zealand (1958/59); East Africa (1963/64); India (1963/64).
- Geoff Morton (1952) : G. D. Morton (Middlesex)
- **Alan Moss** (1953–1967) : A. E. Moss (Middlesex). Tours: West Indies (1953/54); Pakistan (1955/56); West Indies (1959/60).
- Victor Munden (1955) : V. S. Munden (Leicestershire)
- **Deryck Murray** (1964) : D. L. Murray (Trinidad and Tobago, Nottinghamshire, Warwickshire)
- **John Murray** (1956–1968/69) : J. T. Murray (Middlesex). Tours: New Zealand (1960/61); India & Pakistan (1961/62); Australia & New Zealand (1962/63); South Africa (1964/65); Australia & New Zealand (1965/66); Pakistan & Ceylon (1968/69).
- Mike Murray (1958–1963) : M. P. Murray (Middlesex)
- Bill Murray-Wood (1955–1956) : W. Murray-Wood (Kent)
- **Mushtaq Mohammad** (1964) : Mushtaq Mohammad (Karachi, Northamptonshire)

== N ==
- Rex Neame (1957) : A. R. B. Neame (Kent)
- Douglas Newman (1953) : D. L. Newman (Middlesex)
- David Nicholls (1973) : D. Nicholls (Kent)
- Tony Nicholson (1963) : A. G. Nicholson (Yorkshire)
- Mick Norman (1961) : M. E. J. C. Norman (Northamptonshire, Leicestershire)
- Ivor Norton (1958–1960) : G. I. D. Norton (MCC)
- Albert Nutter (1949) : A. E. Nutter (Lancashire, Northamptonshire)

== O ==
- Charles Oakes (1949) : C. Oakes (Sussex)
- **Alan Oakman** (1953–1962) : A. S. M. Oakman (Sussex). Tours: South Africa (1956/57).
- Robin O'Brien (1958) : R. O'Brien (Cambridge University)
- **† Chris Old** (1970–1979) : C. M. Old (Yorkshire). Tours: India, Pakistan & Sri Lanka (1972/73); West Indies (1973/74); Australia & New Zealand (1974/75); India, Sri Lanka & Australia (1976/77).
- † Dudley Owen-Thomas (1973/74) : D. R. Owen-Thomas (Surrey). Tours: East Africa (1973/74).

== P ==
- **Doug Padgett** (1960–1960/61) : D. E. V. Padgett (Yorkshire). Tours: New Zealand (1960/61).
- **Charles Palmer** (1948/49–1957) : C. H. Palmer (Leicestershire, Worcestershire). Tours: South Africa (1948/49); West Indies (1953/54).
- **Ken Palmer** (1964–1966) : K. E. Palmer (Somerset). Tours: South Africa (1964/65).
- **Peter Parfitt** (1959–1973/74) : P. H. Parfitt (Middlesex). Tours: India, Pakistan & Ceylon (1961/62); Australia & New Zealand (1962/63); East Africa (1963/64); India (1963/64); South Africa (1964/65); Australia & New Zealand (1965/66); East Africa (1973/74).
- **Gilbert Parkhouse** (1950–1950/51) : W. G. A. Parkhouse (Glamorgan). Tours: Australia & New Zealand (1950/51).
- **Jim Parks** (1953–1967/68) : J. M. Parks (Sussex, Somerset). Tours: Pakistan (1955/56); South Africa (1956/57); West Indies (1959/60); New Zealand (1960/61); India (1963/64); South Africa (1964/65); Australia & New Zealand (1965/66); West Indies (1967/68).
- Frank Parr (1953) : F. D. Parr (Lancashire)
- Brian Parsons (1964) : A. B. D. Parsons (Surrey)
- Robert Paterson (1957–1958) : R. F. T. Paterson (Essex)
- Tony Pawson (1947) : H. A. Pawson (Kent)
- Kenneth Pearson (1946) : K. R. Pearson (MCC)
- Arthur Phebey (1959–1964) : A. H. Phebey (Kent)
- Paddy Phelan (1965) : P. J. Phelan (Essex)
- Dan Piachaud (1962–1968) : J. D. Piachaud (Hampshire)
- Harry Pilling (1969–1974) : H. Pilling (Lancashire)
- **Winston Place** (1947/48) : W. Place (Lancashire). Tours: West Indies (1947/48).
- **† Pat Pocock** (1967–1976) : P. I. Pocock (Surrey). Tours: Ceylon (1969/70); West Indies (1967/68); Pakistan & Ceylon (1968/69); India, Pakistan & Sri Lanka (1972/73); West Indies (1973/74).
- **Dick Pollard** (1946/47–1948) : R. Pollard (Lancashire). Tours: Australia & New Zealand (1946/47).
- Stuart Pollock (1954–1957) : J. S. Pollock (Ireland)
- **Cyril Poole** (1950–1953) : C. J. Poole (Nottinghamshire). Tours: India, Pakistan & Ceylon (1951/52).
- Oliver Popplewell (1953) : O. B. Popplewell (Cambridge University)
- Jim Pressdee (1965) : J. S. Pressdee (Glamorgan)
- Ken Preston (1951–1952) : K. C. Preston (Essex)
- John Pretlove (1959–1968) : J. F. Pretlove (Kent)
- **John Price** (1963/64–1972) : J. S. E. Price (Middlesex). Tours: India (1963/64); South Africa (1964/65).
- **Roger Prideaux** (1960/61–1970) : R. M. Prideaux (Northamptonshire). Tours: New Zealand (1960/61); Pakistan & Ceylon (1968/69).
- Tom Pugh (1960) : C. T. M. Pugh (Gloucestershire)
- **Geoff Pullar** (1958–1962/63) : G. Pullar (Lancashire). Tours: West Indies (1959/60); India, Pakistan & Ceylon (1961/62); Australia (1962/63).
- James Purves (1962) : J. H. Purves (Essex)

== Q ==
- Arnold Quick (1948) : A. B. Quick (Essex)

== R ==
- **Clive Radley** (1974–1987) : C. T. Radley (Middlesex)
- **Sonny Ramadhin** (1961) : S. Ramadhin (Trinidad and Tobago, Lancashire)
- **† Derek Randall** (1974–1989) : D. W. Randall (Nottinghamshire). Tours: India, Sri Lanka & Australia (1976/77).
- Victor Ransom (1949–1951) : V. J. Ransom (Hampshire, Surrey)
- Barry Reed (1966) : B. L. Reed (Hampshire)
- Dusty Rhodes (1948–1951/52) : A. E. G. Rhodes (Derbyshire). Tours: India, Pakistan & Ceylon (1951/52).
- **Harold Rhodes** (1959–1963) : H. J. Rhodes (Derbyshire)
- **Dick Richardson** (1958–1964) : D. W. Richardson (Worcestershire)
- **Peter Richardson** (1954–1965) : P. E. Richardson (Worcestershire, Kent). Tours: Pakistan (1955/56); South Africa (1956/57); Australia & New Zealand (1958/59); India, Pakistan & Ceylon (1961/62).
- William Richardson (1959–1961) : G. W. Richardson (Derbyshire)
- **Fred Ridgway** (1951/52) : F. Ridgway (Kent). Tours: India, Pakistan & Ceylon (1951/52).
- Giles Ridley (1968) : G. N. S. Ridley (Kent)
- David Roberts (1963) : D. J. Roberts (Hertfordshire)
- Charles Robins (1954–1962) : R. V. C. Robins (Middlesex)
- Neville Rogers (1949–1954) : N. H. Rogers (Hampshire)
- Peter Rogers (1967) : P. J. Rogers (MCC)
- **† Graham Roope** (1969/70–1976) : G. R. J. Roope (Surrey). Tours: Ceylon (1969/70); India, Pakistan & Sri Lanka (1972/73).
- **Brian Rose** (1977) : B. C. Rose (Somerset)
- Michael Rose (1964) : M. H. Rose (Leicestershire)
- Reginald Routledge (1951) : R. Routledge (Middlesex)
- Robin Rudd (1950–1960) : C. R. D. Rudd (Oxford University). Tours: Canada (1951).
- **Fred Rumsey** (1965–1967) : F. E. Rumsey (Somerset)
- Sid Russell (1961) : S. E. J. Russell (Middlesex)
- **Eric Russell** (1958–1967) : W. E. Russell (Middlesex). Tours: New Zealand (1960/61); India & Pakistan (1961/62); Australia & New Zealand (1965/66).

== S ==
- **Saeed Ahmed** (1966) : Saeed Ahmed (Karachi Whites, Karachi Blues)
- Peter Sainsbury (1955/56–1960) : P. J. Sainsbury (Hampshire). Tours: Pakistan (1955/56).
- Jeremy Sands (1965–1967) : J. N. Sands (MCC)
- John Savage (1961–1962) : J. S. Savage (Leicestershire)
- David Sayer (1960/61–1961) : D. M. Sayer (Kent). Tours: New Zealand (1960/61).
- Edward Scott (1951) : E. K. Scott (Gloucestershire). Tours: Canada (1951).
- Michael Scott (1963) : M. D. Scott (Oxford University)
- **Mike Selvey** (1976/77) : M. W. W. Selvey (Middlesex). Tours: India, Sri Lanka & Australia (1976/77).
- **Derek Shackleton** (1950–1957) : D. Shackleton (Hampshire). Tours: India, Pakistan & Ceylon (1951/52).
- Rowland Shaddick (1947–1952) : R. A. Shaddick (Middlesex)
- Harry Sharp (1947–1957) : H. P. H. Sharp (Middlesex)
- **Phil Sharpe** (1963–1969) : P. J. Sharpe (Yorkshire). Tours: India (1963/64).
- Donald Shearer (1947) : E. D. R. Shearer (Ireland)
- Don Shepherd (1953–1969/70) : D. J. Shepherd (Glamorgan). Tours: Ceylon (1969/70).
- **David Sheppard** (1950/51–1962/63) : D. S. Sheppard (Sussex). Tours: Australia & New Zealand (1950/51); Australia & New Zealand (1962/63).
- Tony Shippey (1967) : P. A. Shippey (Cambridgeshire)
- Alan Shirreff (1946–1955) : A. C. Shirreff (Hampshire, Kent, Somerset)
- **† Ken Shuttleworth** (1968–1971) : K. Shuttleworth (Lancashire). Tours: Australia (1970/71).
- Dennis Silk (1958–1960/61) : D. R. W. Silk (Somerset). Tours: New Zealand (1960/61).
- **Reg Simpson** (1948/49–1960) : R. T. Simpson (Nottinghamshire). Tours: South Africa (1948/49); Australia & New Zealand (1950/51); Australia & New Zealand (1954/55).
- Swaranjit Singh (1956–1958) : Swaranjit Singh (Cambridge University)
- Sandy Singleton (1946) : A. P. Singleton (Worcestershire)
- Doug Slade (1959–1966) : D. N. F. Slade (Worcestershire)
- Edward Slinger (1967) : E. Slinger (MCC)
- Phil Slocombe (1975–1976) : P. A. Slocombe (Somerset)
- Mike Smedley (1966–1972) : M. J. Smedley (Nottinghamshire)
- **Alan Smith** (1962/63–1974/75) : A. C. Smith (Warwickshire). Tours: Australia & New Zealand (1962/63); Australia & New Zealand (1974/75).
- Colin Stansfield Smith (1958) : C. S. Smith (Lancashire)
- **David Smith** (1958–1967) : D. R. Smith (Gloucestershire). Tours: New Zealand (1960/61); India & Pakistan (1961/62).
- **Donald Smith** (1956–1958) : D. V. Smith (Sussex)
- Edwin Smith (1956–1967) : E. Smith (Derbyshire)
- Geoff Smith (1963) : G. J. Smith (Essex)
- **Mike Smith** (1957–1966) : M. J. K. Smith (Warwickshire). Tours: West Indies (1959/60); India & Pakistan (1961/62); East Africa (1963/64); India (1963/64); South Africa (1964/65); Australia & New Zealand (1965/66).
- Michael J. Smith (1967–1974) : M. J. Smith (Middlesex)
- Ray Smith (1947–1952) : R. Smith (Essex)
- **Peter Smith** (1946/47–1950) : T. P. B. Smith (Essex). Tours: Australia & New Zealand (1946/47).
- **Gerald Smithson** (1947/48) : G. A. Smithson (Yorkshire). Tours: West Indies (1947/48).
- **† John Snow** (1965–1970/71) : J. A. Snow (Sussex). Tours: West Indies (1967/68); Pakistan & Ceylon (1968/69); Australia (1970/71).
- **Garfield Sobers** (1961–1962) : G. S. Sobers (Barbados, Nottinghamshire)
- Terry Spencer (1955–1961) : C. T. Spencer (Leicestershire)
- **Dick Spooner** (1951/52–1953/54) : R. T. Spooner (Warwickshire). Tours: India, Pakistan & Ceylon (1951/52); West Indies (1953/54).
- John Springall (1960–1961) : J. D. Springall (Nottinghamshire)
- **Brian Statham** (1950/51–1962/63) : J. B. Statham (Lancashire). Tours: Australia & New Zealand (1950/51); India, Pakistan & Ceylon (1951/52); West Indies (1953/54); Australia & New Zealand (1954/55); South Africa (1956/57); West Indies (1959/60); Australia (1962/63).
- Barry Stead (1973) : B. Stead (Yorkshire, Nottinghamshire)
- **David Steele** (1967–1976) : D. S. Steele (Northamptonshire)
- Harold Stephenson (1950–1955/56) : H. W. Stephenson (Somerset). Tours: Pakistan (1955/56).
- Mike Stevenson (1955–1967) : M. H. Stevenson (Derbyshire)
- **Micky Stewart** (1956–1963/64) : M. J. Stewart (Surrey). Tours: East Africa (1963/64); India (1963/64).
- Jim Stewart (1960/61) : W. J. P. Stewart (Warwickshire). Tours: New Zealand (1960/61).
- Peter Stoddart (1958) : P. L. B. Stoddart (Buckinghamshire)
- Andy Stovold (1976) : A. W. Stovold (Gloucestershire)
- David Straw (1964) : D. S. Straw (MCC)
- **Raman Subba Row** (1954–1964) : R. Subba Row (Surrey, Northamptonshire). Tours: Australia & New Zealand (1958/59); West Indies (1959/60).
- Stuart Surridge (1954–1956) : W. S. Surridge (Surrey)
- Billy Sutcliffe (1950–1959) : W. H. H. Sutcliffe (Yorkshire). Tours: Pakistan (1955/56).
- Ken Suttle (1953/54) : K. G. Suttle (Sussex). Tours: West Indies (1953/54).
- Ray Swallow (1957) : R. Swallow (Derbyshire)
- **Roy Swetman** (1955/56–1967) : R. Swetman (Surrey, Nottinghamshire, Gloucestershire). Tours: Pakistan (1955/56); Australia & New Zealand (1958/59); West Indies (1959/60).
- David Sydenham (1963–1964) : D. A. D. Sydenham (Surrey)

== T ==
- John Tanner (1955) : J. D. P. Tanner (Oxford University)
- **Roy Tattersall** (1950/51–1964) : R. Tattersall (Lancashire). Tours: Australia & New Zealand (1950/51); India, Pakistan & Ceylon (1951/52).
- Brian Taylor (1957–1970) : B. Taylor (Essex). Tours: South Africa (1956/57).
- Derek Taylor (1976) : D. J. S. Taylor (Somerset, Surrey)
- John Taylor (1967) : J. F. Taylor (Essex)
- **Ken Taylor** (1959) : K. Taylor (Yorkshire)
- **† Bob Taylor** (1963–1975) : R. W. Taylor (Derbyshire). Tours: Ceylon (1969/70); Australia (1970/71); West Indies (1973/74); Australia & New Zealand (1974/75).
- Bill Thomas (1954) : W. O. Thomas (Cambridge University)
- Alec Thompson (1946–1955) : A. W. Thompson (Middlesex)
- John Thompson (1951) : J. R. Thompson (Warwickshire). Tours: Canada (1951).
- **Ian Thomson** (1955/56–1964/65) : N. I. Thomson (Sussex). Tours: Pakistan (1955/56); South Africa (1964/65).
- Henry Tilly (1955–1960) : H. W. Tilly (Middlesex)
- Ron Tindall (1963) : R. A. E. Tindall (Surrey)
- Ted Tinkler (1960–1961) : E. Tinkler (Worcestershire)
- **† Fred Titmus** (1950–1974/75) : F. J. Titmus (Middlesex). Tours: Pakistan (1955/56); Australia & New Zealand (1962/63); India (1963/64); South Africa (1964/65); Australia (1965/66); West Indies (1967/68); Australia & New Zealand (1974/75).
- **† Roger Tolchard** (1967–1976/77) : R. W. Tolchard (Leicestershire). Tours: India, Pakistan & Sri Lanka (1972/73); India, Sri Lanka & Australia (1976/77).
- Maurice Tompkin (1951–1955/56) : M. Tompkin (Leicestershire). Tours: Pakistan (1955/56).
- Charles Toole (1967) : C. L. Toole (MCC)
- Peter Topley (1973) : P. A. Topley (Kent)
- Alan Townsend (1953) : A. Townsend (Warwickshire)
- **Maurice Tremlett** (1947/48–1952) : M. F. Tremlett (Somerset). Tours: West Indies (1947/48); South Africa (1948/49).
- **Fred Trueman** (1953/54–1964) : F. S. Trueman (Yorkshire). Tours: West Indies (1953/54); Australia & New Zealand (1958/59); West Indies (1959/60); Australia & New Zealand (1962/63).
- **Glenn Turner** (1967) : G. M. Turner (Otago, Northern Districts, Worcestershire)
- **Frank Tyson** (1954/55–1959) : F. H. Tyson (Northamptonshire). Tours: Australia & New Zealand (1954/55); South Africa (1956/57); Australia & New Zealand (1958/59).

== U ==
- Derek Ufton (1961) : D. G. Ufton (Kent)
- **† Derek Underwood** (1964–1985) : D. L. Underwood (Kent). Tours: Pakistan & Ceylon (1968/69); Australia (1970/71); India, Pakistan & Sri Lanka (1972/73); West Indies (1973/74); Australia & New Zealand (1974/75); India, Sri Lanka & Australia (1976/77).

== V ==
- Roy Virgin (1966–1972) : R. T. Virgin (Somerset, Northamptonshire)

== W ==
- Owen Wait (1959–1961) : O. J. Wait (Surrey)
- Anthony Waite (1962) : A. C. Waite (Middlesex)
- Michael Walford (1950–1951) : M. M. Walford (Somerset). Tours: Canada (1951).
- **Peter Walker** (1960–1967) : P. M. Walker (Glamorgan)
- Chris Walton (1956–1957) : A. C. Walton (Middlesex)
- **Alan Ward** (1967–1976) : A. Ward (Derbyshire). Tours: Australia (1970/71).
- **Johnny Wardle** (1947/48–1956/57) : J. H. Wardle (Yorkshire). Tours: West Indies (1947/48); West Indies (1953/54); Australia & New Zealand (1954/55); South Africa (1956/57).
- Antony Warr (1950) : A. L. Warr (Oxford University)
- **John Warr** (1950–1958) : J. J. Warr (Middlesex). Tours: Australia & New Zealand (1950/51); Canada (1951).
- **Cyril Washbrook** (1946/47–1964) : C. Washbrook (Lancashire). Tours: Australia & New Zealand (1946/47); South Africa (1948/49); Australia & New Zealand (1950/51).
- Alan Wassell (1959) : A. R. Wassell (Hampshire)
- **Allan Watkins** (1948/49–1963) : A. J. Watkins (Glamorgan). Tours: South Africa (1948/49); India, Pakistan & Ceylon (1951/52); Pakistan (1955/56).
- **Willie Watson** (1953/54–1963) : W. Watson (Yorkshire, Leicestershire). Tours: West Indies (1953/54); Australia & New Zealand (1958/59); New Zealand (1960/61).
- Peter Watts (1960–1963) : P. D. Watts (Northamptonshire)
- Jim Watts (1960–1965) : P. J. Watts (Northamptonshire)
- Rupert Webb (1959) : R. T. Webb (Sussex)
- Jack Webster (1954) : J. Webster (Northamptonshire)
- Ray Weeks (1953) : R. T. Weeks (Warwickshire)
- Evelyn Wellings (1946) : E. M. Wellings (Surrey)
- Bomber Wells (1955–1961) : B. D. Wells (Gloucestershire, Nottinghamshire)
- **Alan Wharton** (1961) : A. Wharton (Lancashire, Leicestershire)
- Ossie Wheatley (1958) : O. S. Wheatley (Warwickshire, Glamorgan)
- Robert Whitby (1957) : R. L. Whitby (Cambridge University)
- Philip Arthur Whitcombe (1956) : P. A. Whitcombe (Middlesex)
- **Butch White** (1961–1965) : D. W. White (Hampshire). Tours: India & Pakistan (1961/62).
- Bob White (1961) : R. A. White (Middlesex, Nottinghamshire)
- Geoff Whittaker (1950) : G. J. Whittaker (Surrey)
- Guy Willatt (1951–1961) : G. L. Willatt (Nottinghamshire, Derbyshire)
- **Peter Willey** (1975–1985) : P. Willey (Northamptonshire, Leicestershire)
- Charles Williams, Baron Williams of Elvel (1956) : C. C. P. Williams (Essex)
- **Bob Willis** (1970/71–1976/77) : R. G. D. Willis (Surrey, Warwickshire). Tours: Australia (1970/71); West Indies (1973/74); Australia & New Zealand (1974/75); India, Sri Lanka & Australia (1976/77).
- **† Don Wilson** (1963–1970/71) : D. Wilson (Yorkshire). Tours: Ceylon (1969/70); New Zealand (1960/61); India (1963/64); Australia (1970/71).
- Gerald Wilson (1957) : G. C. Wilson (MCC)
- Vic Wilson (1952–1963) : J. V. Wilson (Yorkshire). Tours: Australia & New Zealand (1954/55).
- Bob Wilson (1961) : R. C. Wilson (Kent)
- Derek Wing (1967–1968) : D. C. Wing (Cambridgeshire)
- Christopher Winn (1959–1961) : C. E. Winn (Sussex)
- **† Barry Wood** (1972–1972/73) : B. Wood (Yorkshire, Lancashire). Tours: India, Pakistan & Sri Lanka (1972/73).
- George Woodhouse (1949) : G. E. S. Woodhouse (Somerset)
- Wilf Wooller (1947–1948) : W. Wooller (Glamorgan)
- **† Bob Woolmer** (1973–1976/77) : R. A. Woolmer (Kent). Tours: India, Sri Lanka & Australia (1976/77).
- **Frank Worrell** (1961–1964) : F. M. M. Worrell (Barbados, Jamaica)
- Michael Wrigley (1948) : M. H. Wrigley (Oxford University)

== Y ==
- Martin Young (1956–1960) : D. M. Young (Gloucestershire, Worcestershire)
- **Jack Young** (1946–1952) : J. A. Young (Middlesex). Tours: South Africa (1948/49).
- **Younis Ahmed** (1973) : Younis Ahmed (Lahore Whites, Surrey, Glamorgan)

== See also ==
- Lists of Marylebone Cricket Club players
