= Marylebone Cricket Club in Bangladesh in 1976–77 =

International cricket tour

The Marylebone Cricket Club (MCC) tour of Bangladesh during the winter of 1976/77 marked the entrance of Bangladesh into international cricket. Though the tour was very short, it gave Bangladesh's players their first taste of international cricket.

In May 1976 Bangladesh invited the MCC to tour. In June, the International Cricket Council discussed Bangladesh's application for membership; they decided to wait until after the MCC tour before voting on the matter.

== The MCC team ==
The 14-man squad, with their ages at the start of the tour, was:

- Ted Clark (captain, 39)
- John Lofting (player-manager, 37)
- John Barclay (22)
- Alan Duff (38)
- Mike Hooper (29)
- Roderick Kinkead-Weekes (25)
- Michael Mence (32)
- Mick Norman (34)
- Dudley Owen-Thomas (28)
- Dan Piachaud (39)
- Nigel Popplewell (19)
- Brian Taylor (44)
- Martin Vernon (25)
- Derek Wing (33)

Apart from Popplewell, whose first-class career was yet to begin, and Lofting, who never played first-class cricket, all the team had had first-class careers, of varying lengths, but only Barclay and Vernon were still playing at that level.

== The tour ==
The MCC team arrived at Dhaka on 27 December 1976. On 29 December, they left for Rajshahi for the first 2-day match against the North Zone. However, the main attraction of the tour was the three-day unofficial Test match at Dhaka against the Bangladesh national side, which drew a total attendance of some 90,000.

== Matches ==
Date	Match	Venue			Result
31 Dec – 1 Jan	2-Day Match	Rajshahi Divisional Stadium, Rajshahi	North Zone: 119 (Omar Khaled Rumy 27, Faruk 23, Raquibul 15, Duff 4/19, Vernon 3/22) & 185/7 (Declared) (Raquibul 73, Faruk 40*, Piachaud 3/24, Barclay 3/26)	MCC: 123/1 (Declared) (Barclay 60, Norman 55*) & 39/4 (Daulat 2/17)	Match Drawn
3-4 Jan	2-Day Match	Chittagong District Stadium, Chittagong	East Zone: 162 (Ashraful Haque 68, Shafiq-ul-Haq 26, Shakil Kashem 24, Piachaud 4/36) & 74 (Shamim Kabir 29, Piachaud 6/24)	MCC: 267/6 (Declared) (Hooper 68*, Barclay 60)	MCC wins by an innings & 60 runs
7 - 9 Jan	3-Day Match	Dhaka National Stadium, Dhaka	Bangladesh: 266/9 (Declared) (Yousuf Rahman Babu 78, Faruk 35, Shamim Kabir 30, Omar Khaled Rumy 28, Piachaud 3/38) & 152/6 (Rumy 32, Shamim Kabir 25)	MCC: 347 (Mence 75*, Norman 74, Barclay 65, Lintu 4/54, Daulat 3/67)	Match drawn
11-12 Jan	2-Day Match	Shamsul Huda Stadium, Jessore	MCC: 204/5 (Declared) (Kinkead-Weekes 68*, Ted Clark 60, Yousuf Rahman Babu 4/37) & 117/4	South Zone: 203/9 (Declared) (Raquibul Hasan 74, Piachaud 4/67) & 72/2 (Raquibul 33*)	Match Drawn

Shamim Kabir led Bangladesh in the historic match at Dhaka. The other players were Raquibul Hasan, Mainul Haque Mainu, Syed Ashraful Haque, Omar Khaled, S. M. Faruk, Shafiq-ul-Haq Hira (wicket-keeper), Yousuf Babu, Daulatuzzaman, Dipu Roy Chowdhury and Nazrul Kader Lintu.

== Aftermath ==
The positive report by the MCC about the standard of Bangladesh cricket helped Bangladesh gain associate membership of the International Cricket Council in July 1977. The interest created by the tour played a big part in the rise in popularity of cricket in Bangladesh through the 1980s.
