= Lemmy (disambiguation) =

Ian "Lemmy" Kilmister (1945–2015) was a British rock musician.

Lemmy may also refer to:

== Entertainment ==
- Lemmy (film), about the musician
- Lemmy pour les dames, a 1962 French Eurospy film
  - Lemmy Caution, its main character
- Lemmy Koopa, a Super Mario Bros. Koopalings character
- Lemuel "Lemmy" Barnet, in the 1950s BBC radio serial Journey into Space

== Other uses ==
- Lemmy (social network), a self-hosted social platform
- Brian Lemmy (born 1937), an English cricketer
- A partial beard style
- A double Jack and Coke drink
