= Charles Toole =

Charles Toole may refer to:

- Charles Toole (American football) (1922-2008), American football coach
- Charles Toole (cricketer) (born 1939), English cricketer
