= Roderick Kinkead-Weekes =

South African-born English cricketer

Personal information
- Full name: Roderick Calder Kinkead-Weekes
- Born: 15 March 1951 (age 75); East London, Cape Province, South Africa
- Batting: Right-handed
- Role: Wicketkeeper

Domestic team information
- Years: Team
- 1976: Middlesex
- 1972: Oxford University

Career statistics
Competition	FC
Matches	6
Runs scored	76
Batting average	10.85
100s/50s	–/–
Top score	25*
Balls bowled	–
Wickets	–
Bowling average	–
5 wickets in innings	–
10 wickets in match	–
Best bowling	–
Catches/stumpings	7/3
- Source: Cricinfo, 25 June 2010

Roderick Calder Kinkead-Weekes was born on 15 March 1951. He is a former South African-born English cricketer. Kinkead-Weekes was a right-handed batsman who played primarily as a wicketkeeper.

After attending Eton College, where he was the captain of the First XI, Kinkead-Weekes went up to Lincoln College, Oxford. He made his first-class debut for Oxford University in 1972 against Leicestershire. He played 3 further first-class matches for the university in 1972, against Warwickshire, Yorkshire, and finally Cambridge University.

In 1976, he played 2 first-class matches for Middlesex against Kent and the touring West Indians. In his 6 first-class matches, he scored 76 runs at a batting average of 10.85. Behind the stumps, he took 7 catches and made 3 stumpings. He toured Bangladesh with MCC in 1976-77.
