= Harry Hooper (cricketer) =

English cricketer (born 1986)

Personal information
- Full name: John Harry Patrick Hooper
- Born: 14 January 1986 (age 40); Tooting Bec, London, England
- Batting: Left-handed
- Bowling: Left-arm medium
- Relatives: Mike Hooper (father)

Domestic team information
- Years: Team
- 2006–2008: Oxford UCCE

Career statistics
Competition	First-class
Matches	7
Runs scored	265
Batting average	29.44
100s/50s	–/2
Top score	79
Catches/stumpings	3/–
- Source: Cricinfo, 16 July 2020

John Harry Patrick Hooper (born 14 January 1986) is an English former first-class cricketer.

The son of the cricketer Mike Hooper, he was born at Tooting Bec and was educated at Charterhouse, before going up to Oxford Brookes University. While studying at Oxford Brookes, he played first-class cricket for Oxford MCCU from 2006 to 2008, making seven appearances. (Note: Oxford UCCE differed from Oxford University Cricket Club in that it was open to students at Oxford Brookes University, whereas Oxford University Cricket Club is exclusively for students of the constituent colleges of the University of Oxford.) He scored 265 runs in his seven matches at an average of 29.44 and a high score of 79, one of two half centuries that he made.
