= Richard Ellis (English cricketer) =

English cricketer (born 1960)

Personal information
- Full name: Richard Gary Peter Ellis
- Born: 20 December 1960 (age 65); Paddington, London, England
- Batting: Right-handed
- Bowling: Right-arm off break
- Relatives: Peter Ellis (father)

Domestic team information
- Years: Team
- 1993–1994: Hertfordshire
- 1985: Gloucestershire
- 1982–1984: Middlesex
- 1981–1983: Oxford University

Career statistics
Competition	First-class	List A
Matches	40	26
Runs scored	2,020	310
Batting average	28.85	12.91
100s/50s	2/11	–/1
Top score	105*	52
Balls bowled	516	5
Wickets	5	–
Bowling average	54.20	–
5 wickets in innings	–	–
10 wickets in match	–	–
Best bowling	2/40	–
Catches/stumpings	21/–	–/–
- Source: Cricinfo, 7 December 2011

Richard Gary Peter Ellis (born 20 December 1960) is a former English cricketer. Ellis was a right-handed batsman who bowled right-arm off break. He was born at Paddington, London.
