= Mike Hooper (cricketer) =

English cricketer

Personal information
- Full name: John Michael Mackenzie Hooper
- Born: 23 April 1947; Milford, Surrey, England
- Died: 2 April 2010 (aged 62)
- Batting: Right-handed
- Bowling: Right-arm medium
- Relatives: Harry Hooper (son)

Domestic team information
- Years: Team
- 1967 to 1972: Surrey

Career statistics
Competition	First-class	List A
Matches	21	17
Runs scored	406	275
Batting average	15.61	16.17
100s/50s	0/0	0/0
Top score	41*	40
Balls bowled	36	36
Wickets	1	2
Bowling average	10.00	23.00
5 wickets in innings	0	0
10 wickets in match	0	n/a
Best bowling	1/10	2/46
Catches/stumpings	14/–	4/–
- Source: CricketArchive, 31 December 2016

John Michael Mackenzie Hooper (23 April 1947 – 2 April 2010) was an English cricketer who played first-class and List A cricket for Surrey from 1967 to 1972.

Mike Hooper was a champion schoolboy cricketer at Charterhouse, and played for English combined schools sides in 1964 and 1965. He was the leading scorer when an MCC Schools team toured South Africa in 1965–66.

Hooper began playing for Surrey in 1967. When Surrey won the Second Eleven Championship in 1968 he scored 805 runs at an average of 53.66, including 168 in an innings victory over Kent. In 10 matches in the County Championship that year, however, he scored only 164 runs at an average of 11.71.

Hooper played irregularly for Surrey thereafter without scoring a fifty. After the 1971 season he left cricket to work in the City of London. He continued to play club cricket, and helped Charterhouse Friars win the Cricketer Cup on three occasions. He toured Bangladesh with MCC in 1976-77. His son, Harry, also played first-class cricket.
