= Timothy O'Brien (theatre designer) =

British theatre designer (1929–2022)

Timothy Brian O'Brien, RDI (8 March 1929 – 14 October 2022) was a British theatre designer.

O'Brien was born in Shillong in British India. He was educated at Cambridge University from 1949 to 1952, and as a Henry Fellow and Fulbright Scholar at the Yale School of Drama from 1952 to 1953. His career began in television at the BBC in 1954. From 1956 to 1965, he was Head of Design of ABC Television, working largely on the Armchair Theatre and at the same time designed for the London stage, mostly new plays by Shaffer, Orton, and others.

As an Associate Artist and Honorary Associate Artist of the Royal Shakespeare Company from 1966, he has designed 31 productions for the company, in particular productions of Troilus and Cressida, and Richard II, directed by John Barton; The Merry Wives of Windsor, Pericles, Prince of Tyre and Love's Labour's Lost, directed by Terry Hands and Enemies, Summerfolk, The Lower Depths and The Zykovs all by Maxim Gorky, directed by David Jones.

O'Brien's designs for the National Theatre included Next of Kin, directed by Harold Pinter; John Gabriel Borkman, directed by Peter Hall and "Tales from the Vienna Woods", directed by Maximilian Schell.

O'Brien designed his first opera, Wagner's The Flying Dutchman, in 1958 for Sadler's Wells and has since designed operas for Covent Garden, ENO, the Vienna State Opera, the Kirov in Leningrad, La Scala, Milan, and opera houses in Berlin, Adelaide, Sydney, Cologne, Oslo, Amsterdam, Geneva and Lisbon. The best known of these have been Michael Tippett's The Knot Garden, directed by Peter Hall; The Bassarids, directed by Hans Werner Henze; Peter Grimes and Wozzeck, directed by Elijah Moshinsky; Lulu, directed by Gotz Friedrich and Luciano Berio's Outis and Wagner's Ring cycle, directed by Graham Vick.

In 1978, he designed the Tim Rice/Andrew Lloyd Webber musical Evita in partnership with Tazeena Firth, directed by Harold Prince. From 2014 until 2016, he was Joint Artistic Director and Co-Designer of the permanent Exhibition of the 400th anniversary of Shakespeare's death on the site of New Place in Stratford-upon-Avon.

At the Prague Quadriennale, he was joint winner of the Gold Medal for set design in 1976; and in 1991 joint winner of the Golden Triga for the best national exhibit.

From 1984 to 1991, he was Chairman of the Society of British Theatre Designers; and in 1991 he was appointed a Royal Designer for Industry, serving as Master of the Faculty of RDIs from 1999 to 2001.

The variety of his work, and its evolution over 50 years, demonstrated a constant embrace of the theatre as a live, collaborative and ephemeral art form.

In 1997, he married the designer Jenny Jones. His brother was the cricketer Robin O'Brien. Timothy O'Brien died from prostate cancer on 14 October 2022, at the age of 93.
