= Martin Vernon =

English cricketer

Personal information
- Full name: Martin Jeffery Vernon
- Born: 4 July 1951; Marylebone, London, England
- Died: 10 September 2024 (aged 73)
- Batting: Right-handed
- Bowling: Right-arm fast-medium
- Role: Bowler

Domestic team information
- Years: Team
- 1974–1976: Middlesex
- 1977: Gloucestershire

Career statistics
Competition	FC	List A
Matches	22	31
Runs scored	146	75
Batting average	6.63	7.50
100s/50s	0/0	0/0
Top score	27	15*
Balls bowled	1847	1399
Wickets	31	26
Bowling average	38.64	40.15
5 wickets in innings	2	0
10 wickets in match	1	n/a
Best bowling	6/58	3/13
Catches/stumpings	5/0	3/0
- Source: Cricinfo, 30 July 2013

Martin Jeffery Vernon (4 July 1951 – 10 September 2024) was an English cricketer. He played for Middlesex between 1974 and 1976 and for Gloucestershire in 1977.

Vernon played irregularly for Middlesex Second XI from 1970, and made his first-team debut in 1974 as an opening bowler. In July 1974, in his third County Championship match, he took 6 for 58 and 5 for 54 against Somerset, twice dismissing Viv Richards leg-before, and dismissing Brian Close for a pair, the first in Close's long career. Vernon took four wickets in seven balls in the second innings. With his pace he was regarded as a possible long-term replacement for John Price in the Middlesex team, but he was unable to maintain his form, and his appearances in first-class cricket were irregular. His best List A cricket figures came in his first match, when he took 3 for 13 off eight overs against Yorkshire in June 1974. He toured Bangladesh with MCC in 1976-77. An ankle injury forced him to retire from professional cricket after the 1977 season.

Vernon had a career in newspaper and magazine advertising, including two positions as a managing director.

Vernon died on 10 September 2024 at the age of 73.
