= Peter Ellis (cricketer) =

English cricketer

Personal information
- Full name: Peter Michael Ellis
- Born: 25 September 1932; Ladywell, Kent, England
- Died: 15 June 2022 (aged 89)
- Batting: Right-handed
- Bowling: Right-arm medium-fast
- Relatives: Richard Ellis (son)

Domestic team information
- Years: Team
- 1953: Marylebone Cricket Club

Career statistics
| Competition | First-class |
|---|---|
| Matches | 1 |
| Runs scored | 0 |
| Batting average | – |
| 100s/50s | –/– |
| Top score | – |
| Balls bowled | 192 |
| Wickets | 0 |
| Bowling average | – |
| 5 wickets in innings | – |
| 10 wickets in match | – |
| Best bowling | – |
| Catches/stumpings | –/– |
- Source: Cricinfo, 22 December 2018

Peter Michael Ellis (25 September 1932 – 15 June 2022) was an English first-class cricketer.

Born at Ladywell, Ellis played second XI cricket for Middlesex from 1950–1953, but was unable to establish himself in the team. He did make a single appearance in first-class cricket for the Marylebone Cricket Club against Cambridge University at Fenner's in 1953. He was not called upon to bat during the match and with his right-arm medium-fast bowling he bowled 32 wicket-less overs. His son, Richard Ellis, also played first-class cricket.

Ellis was cricket professional at Haileybury College from 1964 to 1996. He died in June 2022, at the age of 89.
