= George Hartley (cricketer, born 1909) =

English cricketer

Personal information
- Full name: George Edward Hartley
- Born: 23 July 1909; Walsden, Yorkshire, England
- Died: 25 August 1992 (aged 83); Guildford, Surrey, England
- Batting: Right-handed
- Bowling: Right-arm slow

Domestic team information
- Years: Team
- 1946: Marylebone Cricket Club
- 1935: Denbighshire

Career statistics
Competition	First-class
Matches	1
Runs scored	6
Batting average	3.00
100s/50s	–/–
Top score	3
Catches/stumpings	–/–
- Source: Cricinfo, 24 August 2011

George Edward Hartley (23 July 1909 – 25 August 1992) was an English cricketer. Hartley was a right-handed batsman who bowled right-arm slow. He was born in Walsden, Yorkshire.

Hartley made a single in the 1935 Minor Counties Championship for Denbighshire against Durham. Later, following World War II, Hartley made his only first-class appearance for the Marylebone Cricket Club against Cambridge University in 1946. In this match, he scored 3 runs in the MCC first-innings, before being dismissed by Barry Trapnell, while in their second-innings he scored the same number of runs and was dismissed by the same bowler.

He died in Guildford, Surrey on 25 August 1992.
