= Dudley Owen-Thomas =

English cricketer and lawyer

Personal information
- Full name: Dudley Richard Owen-Thomas
- Born: 20 September 1948 (age 78); Mombasa, Kenya
- Batting: Right-handed
- Bowling: Right-arm off-spin

Domestic team information
- Years: Team
- 1969–1972: Cambridge University
- 1970–1975: Surrey

Career statistics
Competition	FC	List A
Matches	112	73
Runs scored	4891	1179
Batting average	29.11	21.83
100s/50s	8/24	0/3
Top score	182*	66
Balls bowled	1717	–
Wickets	20	–
Bowling average	39.90	–
5 wickets in innings	0	–
10 wickets in match	0	–
Best bowling	3/20	–
Catches/stumpings	48/–	25/–
- Source: Cricinfo, 27 October 2015

Dudley Richard Owen-Thomas (born 20 September 1948) is an English lawyer and former first-class cricketer.

== Education and cricket career ==
Born in Mombasa, Kenya, Owen-Thomas went to school at King's College School, Wimbledon. He captained the First XI in 1967, scoring 815 runs at an average of 58.21, taking 48 wickets at 12.91, and leading them through their 16-match season undefeated. He was one of the outstanding schools cricketers in 1967, winning the award for the best all-rounder in schools cricket and leading the batting for Marylebone Cricket Club (MCC) Schools in two matches at Lord's. He played his first matches for Surrey Second XI in 1967. He spent the summer of 1968 with Surrey Second XI, playing in all 20 of their matches, scoring 658 runs at 22.68 and helping them to the title.

He went up to Emmanuel College, Cambridge, and made his first-class debut for Cambridge University in 1969. In his sixth match, coming to the wicket at 31 for 3 after Cambridge University had followed on against Middlesex, he scored 182 not out in five and a half hours out of a team total of 322 all out. In his next innings he made 101 against Warwickshire. His batting did not progress in 1970, but he had his best season as a bowler, taking 13 wickets for Cambridge at an average of 39.76, but thereafter he played purely as a batsman. He made his first-class debut for Surrey after the university season ended, top-scoring with 73 in his first innings.

In 1971 Owen-Thomas was secretary of the Cambridge University Cricket Club, and scored 747 runs at 49.80, "hitting the ball with the full sweep of the bat". In the second match of the season he made 108 not out against Leicestershire, adding 175 for the third wicket with his captain, Majid Khan, to take Cambridge to a seven-wicket victory. In the match against Oxford University he scored 146 in just under four hours to enable Khan to declare; the match ended in a draw with Oxford nine wickets down. In 1972, once again secretary to Khan, he made 373 runs at 41.44, and in his last match, against Oxford, he scored 114 in a match when nobody else passed 51, and helped Cambridge to an innings victory, their first victory in the series since 1958 after 11 of the previous 12 matches had been drawn. In 10 matches for Surrey later that season he scored two centuries, and he finished the first-class season with 962 runs at 35.62. He was named the Cricket Writers' Club Young Cricketer of the Year for 1972.

He had a sound season with Surrey in 1973, making 751 runs at 30.04, but after that his form declined. He was notably omitted from the East Africa team (which included Kenya the country of his birth) selected to play in the inaugural Cricket World Cup in 1975. Despite his experience in first-class cricket he was overlooked likely as selectors supposedly made a point of picking players that were currently living and playing in East Africa.

Owen-Thomas retired from first-class cricket after the 1975 season. He continued to play club cricket and other matches, appearing several times for Lavinia, Duchess of Norfolk's XI in the 1980s. In the 1976–77 season, Owen-Thomas was a member of the MCC team that was the first international cricket team to tour Bangladesh.

== Later life ==
Owen-Thomas qualified as a solicitor in 1979, and started his own practice in London in 1987, but was struck off in 2008 for breaches of the Solicitors' Accounts Rules. He was on the committee of Surrey County Cricket Club on occasions from 1994.

He married the model Sara Walkden.

In 2006, Owen-Thomas was diagnosed with prostate cancer, which he survived after a prostatectomy.
