= Ted Tinkler =

English cricketer (1921–2011)

Personal information
- Full name: Edgar Tinkler
- Born: 11 March 1921; Burnley, Lancashire, England
- Died: 14 November 2011 (aged 90); Upton-upon-Severn, West Midlands, England
- Batting: Right-handed
- Bowling: Right-arm medium

Domestic team information
- Years: Team
- 1953: Worcestershire
- 1960–1961: MCC
- FC debut: 29 August 1953 Worcestershire v Northamptonshire
- Last FC: 15 August 1961 MCC v Ireland

Career statistics
Competition	First-class
Matches	3
Runs scored	15
Batting average	3.00
100s/50s	0/0
Top score	7
Balls bowled	18
Wickets	0
Bowling average	–
5 wickets in innings	–
10 wickets in match	–
Best bowling	–
Catches/stumpings	0/–
- Source: CricketArchive, 2 October 2007

Edgar Tinkler (11 March 1921 – 14 November 2011), known as Ted, is a former English first-class cricketer who played in three matches. His debut was for Worcestershire in 1953 and two more for Marylebone Cricket Club (MCC) in the early 1960s.
