= Stanley Ilsley =

English cricketer

Personal information
- Full name: Stanley Thomas Ilsley
- Born: 18 June 1938 (age 88); Marylebone, London, England
- Batting: Left-handed
- Bowling: Slow left-arm orthodox

Domestic team information
- Years: Team
- 1956: Marylebone Cricket Club

Career statistics
Competition	First-class
Matches	2
Runs scored	8
Batting average	4.00
100s/50s	–/–
Top score	8
Balls bowled	321
Wickets	5
Bowling average	27.40
5 wickets in innings	–
10 wickets in match	–
Best bowling	3/39
Catches/stumpings	–/–
- Source: Cricinfo, 30 May 2021

Stanley Thomas Ilsley (born 18 June 1938) is an English former first-class cricketer.

Ilsley was associated with Middlesex, appearing for their second eleven with some success between 1955 and 1958 as a slow left-arm orthodox bowler, but was unable to force his way into the Middlesex first eleven. While engaged with Middlesex at Lord's, he did feature in two first-class cricket matches for the Marylebone Cricket Club in 1956, playing against Cambridge University and Oxford University. He took 5 wickets across these two matches, with best figures of 3 for 39.
