= Gamini Goonesena =

Sri Lankan first-class cricketer (1931–2011)

Personal information
- Born: 16 February 1931; Colombo, Ceylon
- Died: 1 August 2011 (aged 80); Canberra, Australia
- Batting: Right-handed
- Bowling: Leg-break and googly
- Role: All-rounder

Domestic team information
- Years: Team
- 1949/50–1961/62: Ceylon
- 1952–1964: Nottinghamshire
- 1954–1957: Cambridge University
- 1960/61–1963/64: New South Wales

Career statistics
| Competition | First-class |
|---|---|
| Matches | 194 |
| Runs scored | 5,751 |
| Batting average | 21.53 |
| 100s/50s | 3/24 |
| Top score | 211 |
| Balls bowled | 35,172 |
| Wickets | 674 |
| Bowling average | 24.37 |
| 5 wickets in innings | 41 |
| 10 wickets in match | 8 |
| Best bowling | 8/39 |
| Catches/stumpings | 108/– |
- Source: CricInfo, 14 April 2023

Gamini Goonesena (16 February 1931 – 1 August 2011) was a Sri Lankan first-class cricketer who played prior to his country being granted Test status. A gifted allrounder who was a right-handed batsman and a legbreak and googly bowler, he played first class cricket over a 19-year timespan, 1949–1968, representing 14 different teams.

== Education & School Cricket ==
Born in Colombo, he was educated at Royal College Colombo where he played in the Royal-Thomian encounter. The Royal College first XI squad was hard at practice in the final week preceding the annual Royal-Thomian encounter. Goonesena was a mere 'net bowler' but coach F.C.de Saram, a percipient observer of the game and its players, in an inspired move, insisted that Goonesena be picked for the 'Big' match to be played over the weekend. This was an unprecedented move for a player to make his debut in the 'Big' match. Goonesena played and captured 4/46 in the match, dismissing both Thomian openers in the crucial second innings, as Royal cruised to a comfortable 9-wicket victory. In the 1948 fixture he announced his burgeoning potential with a match analysis of 10/80.

== Cambridge Blue ==
At Cambridge University between 1954 and 1957, he played in 52 matches and became the first Asian player to captain the side in his last year. As captain he scored 211 in the University match in 1957, which remains the highest individual score by a Cambridge player in University Matches. He then took 4/40 in the Oxford second innings to secure victory by an innings and 186 runs, the biggest margin of defeat since the series began in 1827. He and Geoffrey Cook, who scored 111, also put on 289 runs for the seventh wicket, setting the highest partnership for any wicket by either side in University Matches and the record partnership in first-class cricket for the seventh wicket at Lord's. Both records still stand as of April 2017.

== Cricket career ==
His other principal clubs were Nottinghamshire (94 matches between 1953 and 1964) where he twice completed the 'double' of 1000 runs/100 wickets in a season. He also played in 7 consecutive games for the Gentlemen v Players between 1954 and 1958, which still remains an all-time record for an overseas player. He represented Ceylon against Pakistan in 1950 and again against an International XI in 1968 before they obtained Test status as Sri Lanka in 1982. He also toured the West Indies twice, with an EW Swanton international team in 1956 and with the International Cavaliers in 1965. He also appeared in 7 matches for the Australian state side New South Wales in the Sheffield Shield between 1961 and 1964. He was selected to tour England with the Ceylon team in 1968, but the tour was cancelled just before it was due to begin.

In his very last first class match, playing for the Free Foresters against Oxford University at The Parks in June 1968, he took 10/87 (5/38 and 5/49) to spearhead his team's 299 run victory. During the course of his first-class career he played in a total of 194 matches, scoring 5751 runs (average 21.53) and taking 674 wickets (average 24.37). He also took 108 catches.

== Post Playing career ==
In 1965, he was appointed as Ceylon's representative to the ICC International Cricket Conference and subsequently managed the Sri Lankan Test side on a tour of India. He also played club cricket for Waverley District Cricket Club (now Eastern Suburbs District Cricket Club) in Sydney in the 1970s. During the 1990s, he became President of Colts CC, one of the oldest clubs on the island, and during this time he also worked as a Test Match commentator for Sri Lankan radio and television. He also joined the BBC Test Match Special commentary team when Sri Lanka toured England in 1984 and 1988. He retired in 2004, and lived in Sydney, Australia.

== Valediction ==
He died in Canberra aged 80, on 1 August 2011. Ian Pieris, a contemporary Sri Lankan who played under Goonesena at Cambridge, said: "Gamini was easily the best leg-spinner I have seen, and probably the best all-round cricketer this country produced after the War (WWII). He had a keen cricket brain, and as a captain, stood heads and shoulders above his contemporaries in England at a time when there were captains in the counties such as Peter May (Surrey), Colin Cowdrey (Kent) and Cyril Washbrook (Lancashire) to name a few. He always led from the front be it in bowling, batting or fielding. Gamini would throw himself totally into the game and never gave up. Sadly, Sri Lanka was not able to make proper use of his cricketing brain".
