= Michael Morgan (cricketer, born 1932) =

English cricketer and medical doctor

Personal information
- Full name: Michael Naunton Morgan
- Born: 15 May 1932; Marylebone, Middlesex, England
- Died: 1 October 2017 (aged 85); London, England
- Batting: Right-handed
- Bowling: Right-arm fast-medium

Domestic team information
- Years: Team
- 1950–1959: Berkshire
- 1951–1954: Cambridge University
- 1957: Marylebone Cricket Club

Career statistics
Competition	First-class
Matches	14
Runs scored	49
Batting average	9.80
100s/50s	0/0
Top score	11*
Balls bowled	2,286
Wickets	30
Bowling average	35.40
5 wickets in innings	1
10 wickets in match	0
Best bowling	5/58
Catches/stumpings	4/–
- Source: Cricinfo, 17 January 2019

Michael Naunton Morgan (15 May 1932 – 1 October 2017) was an English first-class cricketer and medical doctor.

The son of the surgeon Sir Clifford Naunton Morgan and his wife Ena Muriel Evans, he was born at Marylebone in May 1932 and was educated at Marlborough College. From Marlborough he went up to the University of Cambridge, where he studied medicine. He debuted in minor counties cricket for Berkshire in the 1950 Minor Counties Championship, before making his first-class debut for Cambridge University the following year against Middlesex at Fenner's. He did not play again in first-class cricket for Cambridge until 1954, when he made twelve appearances, including against the touring Pakistanis. Playing as a right-arm fast-medium bowler, he took 26 wickets for the university at an average of 38.73, with best figures of 5/58. His only five-wicket haul in first-class cricket came against the Marylebone Cricket Club.

Having graduated from Cambridge with a doctorate in medicine, Morgan became a renal surgeon, working at Westminster Hospital. He later made a final first-class appearance for the Marylebone Cricket Club against Cambridge University in 1957, as well as appearing in minor counties cricket for Berkshire until 1959. He died at London in October 2017.
