= Ivor Norton =

English cricketer and British Army officer

Personal information
- Full name: Gerald Ivor Desmond Norton
- Born: 19 May 1919; Earl Shilton, Leicestershire, England
- Died: 18 July 2012 (aged 93); Barnet, London, England
- Batting: Right-handed
- Bowling: Slow left-arm orthodox

Domestic team information
- Years: Team
- 1958–1960: Marylebone Cricket Club

Career statistics
Competition	First-class
Matches	2
Runs scored	4
Batting average	4.00
100s/50s	–/–
Top score	2*
Balls bowled	491
Wickets	17
Bowling average	7.82
5 wickets in innings	2
10 wickets in match	–
Best bowling	6/57
Catches/stumpings	3/–
- Source: Cricinfo, 28 April 2021

Gerald Ivor Desmond Norton MC (19 May 1919 – 18 July 2012) was an English first-class cricketer and British Army officer.

Norton was born in May 1919 at Earl Shilton, Leicestershire. He was educated at Malvern College, where he captained the college cricket team. He served in the British Army during the Second World War, being commissioned as a second lieutenant in the Royal Artillery in June 1940. He was awarded the Military Cross in August 1944, for gallantry in the Normandy landings. He was decorated with the Efficiency Medal in February 1947, at which point he was serving in the King's Royal Rifle Corps as a lieutenant holding the temporary rank of captain. Norton later played first-class cricket for the Marylebone Cricket Club (MCC) on two occasions against Ireland at Dublin in 1958 and 1960. He found success in both matches as a slow left-arm orthodox bowling, taking figures of 4 for 44 in the Irish first innings and 5 for 26 in their second innings, reducing the Irish to 82 for 9 as they held out for a draw. In his second match two years later, he took figures of 6 for 57 in the Irish first innings and 2 for 6 in their second innings, with the match again ending in a draw. He had a long association with club cricket, playing for Wimbledon Cricket Club. Norton died at Barnet in July 2012.
