= Ted Clark =

English cricketer

Personal information
- Full name: Edward Austen Clark
- Born: 13 April 1937 (age 89); Balham, London, England
- Batting: Right-handed
- Bowling: Left-arm medium

Domestic team information
- Years: Team
- 1959–1976: Middlesex

Career statistics
Competition	FC	List A
Matches	200	10
Runs scored	8733	223
Batting average	29.11	24.77
100s/50s	6/53	0/1
Top score	149	51
Balls bowled	3839	224
Wickets	58	6
Bowling average	32.46	27.66
5 wickets in innings	2	-
10 wickets in match	-	-
Best bowling	5/61	2/49
Catches/stumpings	106	1/-
- Source: Cricinfo, 6 November 2013

Edward Austen Clark (born 13 April 1937) is a former English cricketer. He played for Middlesex between 1959 and 1966, with occasional games thereafter until 1976.

== Middlesex career ==
A right-handed middle-order batsman and left-arm medium-paced bowler, Clark made his first-class debut for Middlesex against Cambridge University in June 1959, scoring 25 in the first innings and 100 not out, in two hours, in the second. He topped Middlesex's batting averages in the County Championship that season with 728 runs at 34.66 in 12 matches. Wisden described him as "a splendid batsman, with a fine temperament" and a "readiness to play strokes", and added that his "121 and 73 not out against Northamptonshire when Middlesex were in difficulties showed his fighting qualities".

A back injury restricted his appearances in 1960 but he returned to fitness in 1961, made 1335 runs at 26.70, and was awarded his county cap. He made 1154 runs at 28.85 in 1962, and in the last match of the season, bowling a longer spell than usual with his medium pace, took 5 for 69 against Kent.

In 1963, despite scoring his first century since 1959, his form fell away (662 runs at 18.38) but he returned to form in 1964, making 1454 runs at 32.31 and taking 19 wickets at 27.89, including his best figures, 5 for 61 when he opened the bowling against Surrey. He batted consistently in 1965 (1426 runs at 32.40) and 1966 (1365 runs at 35.00) and hit his last century, his highest score of 149 in 1966 against Kent, when he "proved that aggression paid handsomely".

Clark retired after the 1966 season, but made himself available for Middlesex for first-class and List A matches in 1968 and 1976. He is a member of the Middlesex Hall of Fame.

== MCC career ==
Clark also played first-class and minor cricket for the Marylebone Cricket Club (MCC). With MCC teams he toured Canada and the United States in 1967, East Africa in 1973–74, and Hong Kong, Singapore and Thailand in 1981. He captained MCC teams to Bangladesh in 1976-77 – the first cricket team to tour Bangladesh – and 1978–79.
