= Roger Dermont =

English cricketer

Personal information
- Full name: Roger Wayne Archie Dermont
- Born: 1 April 1945 (age 81); Whitwell, Hertfordshire, England
- Batting: Right-handed
- Bowling: Right-arm fast-medium

Domestic team information
- Years: Team
- 1967: Marylebone Cricket Club
- 1967–1974: Hertfordshire

Career statistics
Competition	First-class
Matches	1
Runs scored	0
Batting average	0.00
100s/50s	–/–
Top score	0
Balls bowled	60
Wickets	2
Bowling average	15.50
5 wickets in innings	–
10 wickets in match	–
Best bowling	2/23
Catches/stumpings	–/–
- Source: Cricinfo, 21 December 2018

Roger Wayne Archie Dermont (born 1 April 1945) is an English former first-class cricketer.

Born at Whitwell, Dermont made a single appearance in first-class cricket for the Marylebone Cricket Club (MCC) against Cambridge University at Lord's in 1967. Batting once in the match, Dermont was dismissed without scoring by Stephen Russell in the MCC first-innings, while with the ball he took two wickets in the Cambridge first-innings, dismissing Mano Ponniah and Roger Knight to finish with figures of 2/23 from nine overs. Later that same season he made his debut for Hertfordshire in minor counties cricket, playing intermittently in the Minor Counties Championship until 1974.
