= Kenneth Day =

English cricketer (1935–1971)

Ken Day
Personal information
- Full name: Kenneth Brian Day
- Born: 19 May 1935; Hendon, Middlesex, England
- Died: 19 January 1971 (aged 35); Fulham, London, England
- Batting: Right-handed
- Role: Wicket-keeper

Domestic team information
- Years: Team
- 1959: Middlesex
- 1958: Marylebone Cricket Club

Career statistics
Competition	First-class
Matches	3
Runs scored	–
Batting average	–
100s/50s	–/–
Top score	–
Balls bowled	–
Wickets	–
Bowling average	–
5 wickets in innings	–
10 wickets in match	–
Best bowling	–
Catches/stumpings	4/4
- Source: Cricinfo, 27 January 2021

Kenneth Brian Day (19 May 1935 – 19 January 1971) was an English cricketer.

Day was a right-handed batsman and wicket-keeper. He made his first-class debut for the Marylebone Cricket Club against Cambridge University at Lord's in 1958, though he wasn't called upon to bat during the match, he did however take a single catch.

Having played for the Middlesex Second XI since 1955, Day made his first-class debut for Middlesex in 1959, making two appearances against Kent and Cambridge University. He again wasn't required to bat in either of these matches, while behind the stumps he took a total of three catches and made four stumpings. In his Second XI career for the county, which spanned from 1955 to 1960, he never once reached double figures and was considered a genuine number eleven batsman.

He died following a fall at his Fulham home, on 19 January 1971 aged 35.
