= Brian Lemmy =

English cricketer

Personal information
- Full name: Brian Allan Lemmy
- Born: 6 January 1937 (age 89); Isleworth, Middlesex, England
- Batting: Right-handed
- Bowling: Right-arm fast-medium

Domestic team information
- Years: Team
- 1961–1962: Staffordshire
- 1958: Marylebone Cricket Club

Career statistics
Competition	First-class
Matches	1
Runs scored	12
Batting average	–
100s/50s	–/–
Top score	7*
Balls bowled	204
Wickets	3
Bowling average	39.00
5 wickets in innings	–
10 wickets in match	–
Best bowling	2/92
Catches/stumpings	1/–
- Source: Cricinfo, 29 November 2011

Brian Allan Lemmy (born 6 January 1937) is a former English cricketer. Lemmy was a right-handed batsman who bowled right-arm fast-medium. He was born at Isleworth, Middlesex.

Lemmy played for Army Northern Command and was capped by the Royal Corps Signals in 1956 playing a full season with the Signals XI. On demobilisation the army he joined the MCC cricket staff. In 1958 he was under contract to Middlesex County Cricket Club playing in 13 second XI matches averaging 5.91 with the bat and taking 23 wickets at an average of 20.3 runs. Lemmy made a single first-class appearance for the Marylebone Cricket Club against Cambridge University at Lord's in 1958. In Cambridge University's first-innings, he took the wickets of David Green and Michael James, finishing with figures of 2/92 from 27 overs. In the Marylebone Cricket Club's first-innings he ended unbeaten on 7. In the university's second-innings, he took the wicket of Richard Bernard, finishing that innings with figures of 1/25 from 7 overs. He ended the match unbeaten on 5 in the Marylebone Cricket Club's second-innings.

He later joined Staffordshire, making his debut for the county in the 1961 Minor Counties Championship against Northumberland. He made two further appearances for the county, once more in 1961 against Durham and in 1962 against the Lancashire Second XI.
