= Jim Watts =

English cricketer

Personal information
- Full name: Patrick James Watts
- Born: 16 June 1940 (age 86); Henlow, Bedfordshire, England
- Batting: Left-handed
- Bowling: Right-arm medium
- Role: All-rounder
- Relatives: Peter Watts (brother)

Domestic team information
- Years: Team
- 1959–1980: Northamptonshire

Career statistics
Competition	First-class	List A
Matches	375	151
Runs scored	14,449	1,845
Batting average	27.94	16.47
100s/50s	10/75	0/3
Top score	145	83
Balls bowled	21,946	4,705
Wickets	333	117
Bowling average	26.15	26.33
5 wickets in innings	7	1
10 wickets in match	0	0
Best bowling	6/18	5/24
Catches/stumpings	279/–	59/–
- Source: CricketArchive, 19 June 2010

Patrick James Watts (born 16 June 1940) is a former English professional cricketer who spent his entire career at Northamptonshire.

== Personal life ==
Watts was educated at Stratton School, Biggleswade, Bedfordshire. His brother, leg-spinner Peter, also played for Northamptonshire between 1958 and 1966.

As the 1978 season began, Watts' wife became seriously ill and subsequently died. He took time off from the game before returning to the side in July that year.

== Career ==
Watts made his Northamptonshire debut as an eighteen-year-old in 1959, and reached 1,000 runs in each of his first four seasons, receiving his county cap in 1962. He was a significant figure in the 1965 Championship challenge, heading the batting averages with 1,211 runs at 31.05 and picking up 44 wickets. Watts asked to be released in 1966; but he was fit enough to set a new Northants County League record two years later, claiming 10–10 for Rushden against Kettering.

Twice Watts took on the Northamptonshire captaincy in very difficult circumstances, and twice he left the side in a better state than he found it. In the autumn of 1970, Northamptonshire faced the future without the services of Roger Prideaux, Brian Reynolds and Albert Lightfoot, and with Mushtaq Mohammad expected to miss a good part of the following summer on tour with Pakistan. Watts, only back at Wantage Road for a season after three years out of the county game, was the committee's choice to take charge. The 1971 season was his first as captain and he marked it with 1,311 runs, and the following August led Northamptonshire to a seven-wicket victory over Ian Chappell's Australians. "The better side won," said secretary Ken Turner. It was, said Watts, "the greatest moment since I became captain". Northamptonshire finished fourth, third and third again in the Championship before Watts handed over the baton to concentrate on his teaching career. Another highlight before he resigned was the 59-run John Player League triumph over one-day specialists Lancashire in 1974; it was Watts' benefit match and he marked the occasion with 61 runs.

The captaincy was given back to him, briefly, in August 1975 when Roy Virgin's reign ended after three months. Watts promptly broke a finger and Mushtaq inherited the job. But he received the call again at the end of 1977 with the club in turmoil as the committee crossed swords with several key players, including the outgoing captain. At the subsequent extraordinary general meeting, held just before Christmas, Watts took his place on the platform to face the members, some of whom had formed themselves into an action group to demand, at the very least, a full explanation of all the behind-the-scenes machinations. The next two summers saw his Northamptonshire team reach the Gillette Cup final, win the Benson & Hedges Cup (with Watts' tactical acumen seen to best advantage in an absorbing semi-final struggle against Mike Brearley's Middlesex at Lord's), and drag itself off the bottom of the Championship table.

== After retirement ==
When Watts retired, once and for all, in 1980, the Annual Report praised both his leadership, "of the highest order", and his valuable contributions with bat and ball. He briefly joined the committee after his retirement and ruffled a few feathers with his support for Les Bentley, the head groundsman sacked in 1982 who unsuccessfully took the club to an industrial tribunal alleging unfair dismissal. Watts' formal links with Northamptonshire ended soon afterwards. In 1999, Northamptonshire introduced six distinguished former players, including Watts, on a list with the title of "Cricketer Emeritus".
