= William Harrington (English cricketer) =

English cricketer

William John Roy Harrington (30 January 1915 – 23 January 1988) was an English first-class cricketer active 1937–51 who played for Middlesex. He was born in St John's Wood; died in Blandford.
