= Bernard Heighes =

English cricketer

Personal information
- Full name: Bernard Roy Heighes
- Born: 16 January 1947; Chiswick, Middlesex, England
- Died: 6 January 2017 (aged 69)
- Batting: Right-handed
- Bowling: Slow left-arm orthodox

Domestic team information
- Years: Team
- 1967: MCC

Career statistics
Competition	First-class
Matches	1
Runs scored	6
Batting average	–
100s/50s	0/0
Top score	6*
Balls bowled	198
Wickets	2
Bowling average	30.50
5 wickets in innings	0
10 wickets in match	0
Best bowling	1/27
Catches/stumpings	0/–
- Source: Cricinfo, 29 September 2014

Bernard Roy Heighes (16 January 1947 – 6 January 2017) was an English cricketer.
