= David Jowett =

English cricketer

Personal information
- Full name: David Colin Patrick Robert Jowett
- Born: 24 January 1931; Clifton Park, Bristol, England
- Died: 7 January 2000 (aged 68); Banbury, Oxfordshire, England
- Batting: Left-handed
- Bowling: Right-arm off break

Domestic team information
- Years: Team
- 1954–1958: Marylebone Cricket Club
- 1952–1955: Oxford University
- 1952–1960: Dorset

Career statistics
Competition	First-class
Matches	50
Runs scored	578
Batting average	12.04
100s/50s	–/2
Top score	57
Balls bowled	9,422
Wickets	125
Bowling average	32.59
5 wickets in innings	3
10 wickets in match	0
Best bowling	7/132
Catches/stumpings	15/–
- Source: Cricinfo, 3 October 2018

David Colin Patrick Robert Jowett (24 January 1931 – 7 January 2000) was an English first-class cricketer.

Jowett was born at Clifton Park in Bristol in January 1931. He was educated at Sherborne School, where he played for the school cricket team from 1947–1949. He carried out his National Service in the Royal Artillery in 1951. In October of that year, he granted the rank of Acting Lieutenant, with Jowett returning to the rank of Second lieutenant in February 1952.

He made his debut for Dorset in minor counties cricket against Cornwall in August 1952 (though his minor counties debut proper had come in 1948 when he played twice for Gloucestershire Second XI in the Minor Counties Championship). After studying at Sherborne School, Jowett went up to St John's College, Oxford. It was there that he made his debut in first-class cricket for Oxford University in May 1952 against Yorkshire at Oxford. His first wicket in first-class cricket was Len Hutton. He played first-class cricket for Oxford University from 1952–1955, making 46 appearances. He scored 566 runs for Oxford University in first-class cricket at an average of 12.57, with a highest score of 57 not out, one of two occasions he passed fifty. As an off break bowler, he took 118 wickets for the university, which came at a bowling average of 32.20. He took five wickets or more in an innings three times, with best figures of 7/132 coming against Surrey in 1954 at Guildford. Besides playing first-class cricket for Oxford University, Jowett also three matches for the Marylebone Cricket Club, and one match for the Free Foresters. Jowett was never on the winning side in any of his fifty first-class matches. His minor counties career with Dorset continued until 1960, with Jowett making 64 appearances in the Minor Counties Championship for the county.

He died at Banbury in Oxfordshire in January 2000.
