= Michael Keeling =

English cricketer and soldier

Personal information
- Full name: Michael Edward Allis Keeling
- Born: 6 November 1925; Westminster, London, England
- Died: 28 July 2017 (aged 91); Battle, Sussex, England
- Batting: Right-handed
- Bowling: Unknown

Domestic team information
- Years: Team
- 1948–1949: Oxford University
- 1948: Marylebone Cricket Club

Career statistics
Competition	First-class
Matches	5
Runs scored	75
Batting average	12.50
100s/50s	–/–
Top score	40
Balls bowled	42
Wickets	0
Bowling average	–
5 wickets in innings	–
10 wickets in match	–
Best bowling	–
Catches/stumpings	1/–
- Source: Cricinfo, 28 March 2020

Michael Edward Allis Keeling (6 November 1925 – 28 July 2017) was an English first-class cricketer.

The son of Sir John Keeling, two brothers John and Brian and one sister Caroline. He was born at Westminster in November 1925. He was educated at Eton College, before briefly serving as a second lieutenant in the Grenadier Guards following the Second World War in October 1945. After serving in Allied-occupied Germany, he returned to England, where he went up to Christ Church, Oxford. While studying at Oxford, he played first-class cricket on four occasions for Oxford University in 1948–49. He scored 67 runs in his four matches for Oxford, with a high score of 40. He also toured Ireland with the Marylebone Cricket Club in 1948, playing a single first-class match against the Ireland cricket team at Dublin.

He took part in the Keeling family tradition of fielding a cricket eleven formed of members of the Keeling family, with the family playing an annual match against the village of Sedlescombe. Keeling died in July 2017 at Battle, Sussex.
