= Anthony Card =

English cricketer

Personal information
- Full name: Anthony John Card
- Born: 13 September 1929 (age 97); Doncaster, Yorkshire, England
- Batting: Unknown
- Bowling: Slow left-arm orthodox

Domestic team information
- Years: Team
- 1955–1958: Marylebone Cricket Club

Career statistics
Competition	First-class
Matches	2
Runs scored	51
Batting average	25.50
100s/50s	–/–
Top score	19*
Balls bowled	148
Wickets	7
Bowling average	12.42
5 wickets in innings	–
10 wickets in match	–
Best bowling	4/26
Catches/stumpings	2/–
- Source: Cricinfo, 21 December 2018

Anthony John Card (born 13 September 1929) is a former English first-class cricketer.

Born at Doncaster, Card played second XI cricket for Yorkshire, Middlesex and Leicestershire from 1953–1959, but was unable to establish himself. He did make two appearances in first-class cricket for the Marylebone Cricket Club, playing against Gloucestershire at Lord's in 1955, with a further appearance at Lord's in 1958 against Cambridge University. He scored a total of 51 runs in these matches, as well as taking seven wickets with his slow left-arm orthodox.
