= Robert Whitby =

English cricketer and solicitor

Personal information
- Full name: Robert Lionel Whitby
- Born: 29 October 1928; Kolkata, Bengal Presidency, British India
- Died: January 2003 (aged 74); Portsmouth, Hampshire, England
- Batting: Right-handed
- Bowling: Right-arm medium-fast

Domestic team information
- Years: Team
- 1950: Cambridge University
- 1957: Marylebone Cricket Club

Career statistics
| Competition | First-class |
|---|---|
| Matches | 2 |
| Runs scored | 23 |
| Batting average | 11.50 |
| 100s/50s | –/– |
| Top score | 12 |
| Balls bowled | 228 |
| Wickets | 0 |
| Bowling average | – |
| 5 wickets in innings | – |
| 10 wickets in match | – |
| Best bowling | – |
| Catches/stumpings | –/– |
- Source: Cricinfo, 28 September 2021

Robert Lionel Whitby MVO (29 October 1928 – January 2003) was an English first-class cricketer.

The son of Robert James Lawrence Whitby, he was born in British India at Calcutta in October 1928. He was educated in England at Charterhouse School, before going up to Caius College, Cambridge. While studying at Cambridge, he played one first-class cricket match for Cambridge University Cricket Club against Essex at Fenner's in 1950. Seven years later he made a second appearance in first-class cricket for the Marylebone Cricket Club against Scotland at Aberdeen. He scored 33 runs in these two matches, while with his right-arm medium-fast bowling, he bowled 38 wicket-less overs. Whitby was appointed a Member of the Royal Victorian Order, 4th Class in the 1968 New Years Honours. Whitby died at Portsmouth in January 2003.
