= Michael Scott (cricketer) =

English cricketer (1933–2015)

Personal information
- Full name: Michael David Scott
- Born: 14 November 1933; Marylebone, London, England
- Died: 30 November 2015 (aged 82)
- Batting: Right-handed
- Role: Wicket-keeper

Domestic team information
- Years: Team
- 1956–1957: Oxford University
- 1959: Wiltshire
- 1963: Marylebone Cricket Club

Career statistics
Competition	First-class
Matches	21
Runs scored	499
Batting average	15.12
100s/50s	–/1
Top score	52
Catches/stumpings	24/11
- Source: Cricinfo, 26 June 2019

Michael David Scott (14 November 1933 – 30 November 2015) was an English first-class cricketer.

Scott was born at Marylebone in November 1933. He was educated at Winchester College, before going up to Worcester College, Oxford. While studying at Oxford he made his debut in first-class cricket for Oxford University against Yorkshire at Oxford in 1956. He appeared in six first-class matches for the university in 1956, before making a further fourteen appearances in 1957. Playing as a wicket-keeper, Scott scored 495 runs at an average of 15.96, with a high score of 52. Behind the stumps he took 24 catches and made 11 stumpings. He later played minor counties cricket for Wiltshire, making three appearances in the 1959 Minor Counties Championship. He made a final appearance in first-class cricket in 1963, when he played for the Marylebone Cricket Club against Oxford University at Lord's. Scott died on 30 November 2015, at the age of 82.
