= Derek Wing =

English cricketer

Personal information
- Full name: Derek Charles Wing
- Born: 11 February 1943 (age 83); Wisbech, Cambridgeshire, England
- Batting: Right-handed
- Bowling: Right-arm fast-medium

Domestic team information
- Years: Team
- 1976–1977: Minor Counties East
- 1972–1975: Minor Counties North
- 1969–1980: Minor Counties
- 1967–1968: Marylebone Cricket Club
- 1964–1986: Cambridgeshire

Career statistics
| Competition | First-class | List A |
|---|---|---|
| Matches | 5 | 28 |
| Runs scored | 59 | 71 |
| Batting average | 14.75 | 4.73 |
| 100s/50s | 0/0 | 0/0 |
| Top score | 42 | 12 |
| Balls bowled | 792 | 1,636 |
| Wickets | 7 | 25 |
| Bowling average | 53.57 | 33.88 |
| 5 wickets in innings | 0 | 0 |
| 10 wickets in match | 0 | n/a |
| Best bowling | 3/20 | 4/40 |
| Catches/stumpings | 1/– | 7/– |
- Source: Cricinfo, 27 April 2011

Derek Charles Wing (born 11 February 1943) is a former English cricketer. Wing was a right-handed batsman who bowled right-arm fast-medium. He was born in Wisbech, Cambridgeshire.

== Cricket career ==
Wing made his debut for Cambridgeshire in the 1964 Minor Counties Championship against Bedfordshire. Wing played Minor counties cricket for Cambridgeshire from 1964 to 1986, which included 98 Minor Counties Championship matches and 4 MCCA Knockout Trophy matches. In 1964, he made his List A debut against Essex in the Gillette Cup. He played eight further List A matches for Cambridgeshire, the last coming against Yorkshire in 1986. In his nine List A matches for the county, Wing took 13 wickets at a bowling average of 23.23, with best figures of 4/40.

Wing also played List A cricket on 12 occasions for Minor Counties North, appearing for them in the Benson and Hedges Cup from 1972 to 1975. In these 12 matches, he took just 5 wickets at an expensive average of 64.20. He also appeared for Minor Counties East on 6 occasions between 1976 and 1977, taking 7 wickets at an average of 28.42 for the team. Lastly, Wing made a single List A appearance for a combined Minor Counties cricket team against Glamorgan in the 1981 Benson & Hedges Cup. In total, Wing played 28 List A matches. In these he scored 71 runs at a batting average of 4.73, with a high score of 12. With the ball he took 25 wickets at an average of 33.88, with best figures of 4/40.

Wing also appeared in a handful of first-class matches. His debut first-class match came for the Marylebone Cricket Club (MCC) against Cambridge University in 1967. The following year he toured Ireland with the club, playing a single first-class match against Ireland. He later played three first-class fixtures for the Minor Counties, two in 1969 against the touring West Indians and New Zealanders, and later in 1976 against the touring West Indians. In his 5 first-class matches, he scored 59 runs at an average of 14.75, with a high score of 42. With the ball he took 7 wickets at an average of 53.57, with best figures of 3/20.

In the 1976–77 season, Wing was a member of the MCC team that was the first international cricket team to tour Bangladesh.
