= Robin O'Brien =

Personal information
- Full name: Robin O'Brien
- Born: 20 November 1932; Shillong, Assam, British India
- Died: 29 August 1959 (aged 26); Biddenden, Kent, England
- Batting: Right-handed
- Bowling: Right-arm off break

Domestic team information
- Years: Team
- 1954–1956: Cambridge University
- 1954–1958: Ireland
- 1958: Marylebone Cricket Club

Career statistics
Competition	First-class
Matches	40
Runs scored	1,609
Batting average	22.66
100s/50s	2/5
Top score	146
Balls bowled	6
Wickets	0
Bowling average	–
5 wickets in innings	–
10 wickets in match	–
Best bowling	–
Catches/stumpings	10/–
- Source: Cricinfo, 21 October 2018

Robin O'Brien (20 November 1932 – 26 August 1959) was an Irish first-class cricketer.

O'Brien was born at Shillong in British India to Brigadier Brian Palliser O'Brien and Elinor Laura O'Brien. He was educated at Wellington College, Berkshire, where he played for the cricket eleven from 1948–1952. Upon completing his studies, he went up to the University of Cambridge, where he studied economics before switching to law.

While studying at Cambridge, he made his debut in first-class cricket for Cambridge University Cricket Club against Lancashire at Fenner's in 1954. He played six first-class matches for Cambridge University in 1954, in addition to making his debut for Ireland in first-class matches, when he played against Scotland at Paisley. O'Brien played first-class cricket for Cambridge University until 1956, making a total of 35 appearances. Across his 35 first-class matches for the university, O'Brien scored 1,418 runs at an average of 22.87.

His most prolific season was in 1956, when he scored 796 runs, second only to Ted Dexter. He also scored both of his first-class centuries in this season, with 107 against Lancashire and 146 against Oxford University. In addition to his 35 first-class matches for Cambridge University, O'Brien also played four for Ireland to 1958, scoring 164 runs and registering one half century. He also made one first-class appearance for the Marylebone Cricket Club against Cambridge University in 1958. He gained his cricket blue in 1955, also winning blues in field hockey and golf. O'Brien undertook his National Service with the Royal Army Ordnance Corps while at Cambridge, serving with the rank of Second Lieutenant.

He left Cambridge without achieving a degree, but nonetheless was employed in the city by Henry Gardner and Co Ltd. O'Brien fell ill in 1959 and was diagnosed with leukemia. Despite having surgery he succumbed to the disease in August 1959. His brother is the theatre designer Timothy O'Brien.
