= Jeremy Sands =

Scottish cricketer

Personal information
- Full name: Jeremy Nigel Sands
- Born: 9 January 1944 (age 82); Carshalton, Surrey, England
- Batting: Right-handed

Domestic team information
- Years: Team
- 1965–1967: Marylebone Cricket Club

Career statistics
| Competition | First-class |
|---|---|
| Matches | 4 |
| Runs scored | 37 |
| Batting average | 7.40 |
| 100s/50s | –/– |
| Top score | 17 |
| Catches/stumpings | 1/– |
- Source: Cricinfo, 22 June 2021

Jeremy Nigel Sands (born 9 January 1944) is an English-born Scottish former first-class cricketer.

Sands was born in England at Carshalton in January 1944. He was educated in Scotland at the Edinburgh Academy, where he played for the rugby fifteen as a fly-half. From there he went up to the University of Edinburgh. Sands made his debut in first-class cricket for the Marylebone Cricket Club (MCC) against Scotland at Glasgow in 1965. In the same year he made two further appearances in first-class cricket for Scotland against the touring New Zealanders at Hamilton Crescent and Ireland at Dublin. He made a final first-class appearance in 1967, for the MCC against Scotland. In four first-class matches, Sands scored 37 runs with a highest score of 17.
