= Owen Wait =

English cricketer

Owen John Wait (2 August 1926 – 26 April 1981) was an English first-class cricketer active 1949–61 who played for Surrey, Marylebone Cricket Club (MCC) and Cambridge University. He was born in Dulwich; died in Bromley.
