= Geoffrey Cook (cricketer, born 1936) =

English cricketer

Personal information
- Full name: Geoffrey William Cook
- Born: 9 February 1936 (age 90); Beckenham, Kent
- Batting: Right-handed
- Bowling: Right-arm off-break

Domestic team information
- Years: Team
- 1956–1958: Cambridge University
- 1957: Kent
- 1967–1970: Berkshire

Career statistics
Competition	First-class
Matches	47
Runs scored	1,858
Batting average	28.15
100s/50s	3/12
Top score	140
Balls bowled	4,843
Wickets	64
Bowling average	36.07
5 wickets in innings	0
10 wickets in match	0
Best bowling	4/45
Catches/stumpings	26/–
- Source: CricInfo, 19 April 2017

Geoffrey William Cook (born 9 February 1936) is a former English cricketer who played mainly for Cambridge University. He was born in Beckenham in Kent and attended Dulwich College before going up to Queens' College, Cambridge in 1955. He later became an Honorary Life Patron of the Queens' College Cricket Club.

Cook played Second XI cricket for Kent from 1954 to 1959, appearing in both the Minor Counties Championship and the Second XI Championship for the team. He made his first-class cricket debut for Cambridge against Sussex at Fenner's in May 1956 before going on to play 37 times for the university between 1956 and 1958, winning a cricket Blue and playing in two University matches.

In the 1957 University Match he batted in a partnership with Gamini Goonesena worth 289 runs for the seventh wicket with Cook scoring 111 runs. This set a record for the highest partnership for any wicket by either team in University Matches and the record partnership in first-class cricket for the seventh wicket at Lord's, both records which still stand as of April 2017.

Cook made four First XI appearances for Kent in the 1957 County Championship and, after he had completed his degree, also turned out in first-class cricket for Free Foresters and Marylebone Cricket Club (MCC).His final first-class appearance was in 1961, playing for LC Stevens XI against his old University having appeared in a total of 47 first-class matches. Between 1967 and 1970 he made seven appearances for Berkshire in the Minor Counties Championship.
