= Peter Watts (cricketer, born 1938) =

English cricketer

Personal information
- Full name: Peter David Watts
- Born: 31 March 1938; Henlow, Bedfordshire, England
- Died: 28 November 2023 (aged 85)
- Batting: Left-handed
- Bowling: Right-arm leg-break and googly
- Role: All-rounder
- Relatives: Jim Watts (brother)

Domestic team information
- Years: Team
- 1958–1966: Northamptonshire
- 1967: Nottinghamshire
- First-class debut: 18 June 1958 Northamptonshire v Cambridge University
- Last First-class: 31 July 1967 Nottinghamshire v Surrey
- List A debut: 22 May 1963 Northamptonshire v Warwickshire
- Last List A: 13 May 1967 Nottinghamshire v Northamptonshire

Career statistics
Competition	FC	List A
Matches	183	6
Runs scored	4567	129
Batting average	21.04	43.00
100s/50s	0/21	0/0
Top score	91	40*
Balls bowled	19757	114
Wickets	307	0
Bowling average	32.79	–
5 wickets in innings	12	–
10 wickets in match	1	–
Best bowling	7/77	–
Catches/stumpings	174/–	1/–
- Source: CricketArchive, 21 May 2012

Peter David Watts (31 March 1938 – 28 November 2023) was an English cricketer who played first-class and List A cricket for Northamptonshire and Nottinghamshire between 1958 and 1967. He also played Minor counties cricket for Bedfordshire and Shropshire. He was born at Henlow, Bedfordshire and educated at Bedford Modern School.

Watts was a left-handed lower middle order batsman and a right-arm leg-break and googly bowler who played at a time when leg-spin was very much out of favour in English county cricket. He was also a fine fieldsman, taking 174 catches in his 183 first-class matches.

He was the elder brother of Jim Watts, who played alongside him for Northamptonshire as a left-handed middle order batsman and right-arm medium-pace bowler and who was also later a successful captain of the team.

== Cricket career ==
Having played Minor Counties cricket for Bedfordshire since 1955 and for Northamptonshire's second eleven since 1956, Peter Watts made his first-class debut in 1958 in a couple of matches and then played in almost half the county's games in 1959, though his bowling opportunities were limited by Northamptonshire's reliance on the two Australian spin bowlers, George Tribe, who retired at the end of the 1959 season, and Jack Manning. In fact, in his first match of the season, against Warwickshire, he was the fourth spin bowler called on after Tribe, Manning and slow left-arm spinner Michael Allen, but took five wickets for just 30 runs, all five wickets coming in a spell of 53 balls at a cost of just 10 runs. He improved on these bowling figures in the match against Cambridge University with six second innings wickets for 73 runs and he also made his maiden 50 in this game.

Watts played in about a half of Northamptonshire's first-class matches in 1959, 1960 and 1961, taking between 30 and 40 wickets in each season and contributing useful lower order runs without ever cementing his place in the side. In 1962, however, he played regularly and his tally of wickets advanced to 59. These figures included the most successful bowling figures of his first-class career: in the game against Hampshire at Dean Park, Bournemouth, he took six for 63 in the first innings and seven for 77 in the second, achieving both his best match and innings figures in the same game.

Watts had a poor season in 1963 and was omitted from the side in the second half of the season. He returned to regular cricket in 1964, however, and with 788 runs and 64 wickets had his best all-round season; he also took 36 catches. Against Derbyshire he made an unbeaten 88, batting at No 8. In the next game, against Worcestershire, he was promoted to bat at No 3 and made 91, and this was to be his highest first-class score. In that match against Worcestershire, however, other spin bowlers Malcolm Scott and David Steele bowled 35 overs each in Worcestershire's first innings, while Watts bowled only three. The following season, 1965, that was increasingly the pattern: Watts was played largely for his useful batting and his number of overs bowled and his total of wickets both more than halved. In some compensation, he scored 852 runs at an average of 25.81, with six half-centuries, though the highest was just 64. In 1966, however, Mushtaq Mohammad was available for County Championship cricket for Northamptonshire as a high-class batsman and leg-break and googly bowler; Watts played until early June, but then was dropped to the second eleven and left the county at the end of the season.

He was registered in 1967 by Nottinghamshire and played regularly in that season, but both his batting and his bowling were less successful, and he left the county after a single season, and did not play first-class or limited-overs cricket again.

In 1969, Watts played a few Minor Counties matches for Shropshire and he returned to his home county of Bedfordshire for a single final game in 1971.
