= Jeremy Cook =

English cricketer

Personal information
- Full name: Jeremy Cook
- Born: 20 July 1941 (age 85); Leicester, Leicestershire, England
- Batting: Right-handed
- Bowling: Right-arm fast-medium

Domestic team information
- Years: Team
- 1961–1963: Marylebone Cricket Club

Career statistics
Competition	First-class
Matches	2
Runs scored	52
Batting average	13.00
100s/50s	–/–
Top score	35
Balls bowled	218
Wickets	7
Bowling average	14.71
5 wickets in innings	1
10 wickets in match	–
Best bowling	5/48
Catches/stumpings	3/–
- Source: Cricinfo, 22 December 2018

Jeremy Cook (born 20 July 1941) is an English former first-class cricketer.

Born at Leicester, Cook played second XI cricket for Leicestershire, Surrey and Middlesex from 1959–1969, but was unable to establish himself in their starting XI's. He did make two appearances in first-class cricket for the Marylebone Cricket Club, playing against Ireland at Dublin in 1961, with a further appearance at Lord's in 1963 against Oxford University. A right-arm fast-medium bowler, Cook took a five wicket haul against Ireland, taking 5/48 in the Irish first-innings.
