= Gerald Wilson (cricketer) =

English cricketer

Personal information
- Full name: Gerald Charles Wilson
- Born: 25 December 1936 (age 89); Hayes, Middlesex, England
- Batting: Right-handed
- Bowling: Right-arm medium

Domestic team information
- Years: Team
- 1957: Marylebone Cricket Club

Career statistics
Competition	First-class
Matches	2
Runs scored	10
Batting average	–
100s/50s	–/–
Top score	7*
Balls bowled	378
Wickets	3
Bowling average	70.33
5 wickets in innings	–
10 wickets in match	–
Best bowling	2/85
Catches/stumpings	2/–
- Source: Cricinfo, 14 August 2021

Gerald Charles Wilson (born 25 December 1936) is an English former first-class cricketer.

Wilson made two appearances in first-class cricket for the Marylebone Cricket Club (MCC) in 1957, playing against Oxford University at Lord's, and on the MCC's Scottish tour against Scotland at Aberdeen. He took 3 wickets in his two matches with his right-arm medium pace bowling, while with the bat he scored 10 runs. Wilson was appointed the cricket coach at Millfield in 1959, a school which was founded by the Somerset cricketer Jack Meyer. It was a role he continued to hold in 1994.
