= Dan Piachaud =

Sri Lankan cricketer (1937–2026)

Personal information
- Full name: James Daniel Piachaud
- Born: 1 March 1937; Colombo, Western Province, British Ceylon
- Died: 2 April 2026 (aged 89)
- Batting: Right-handed
- Bowling: Right-arm off break

Domestic team information
- Years: Team
- 1958–1961: Oxford University
- 1960: Hampshire
- 1962–1968: Marylebone Cricket Club

Career statistics
Competition	First-class
Matches	71
Runs scored	1,037
Batting average	12.20
100s/50s	–/–
Top score	40
Balls bowled	12,227
Wickets	205
Bowling average	24.73
5 wickets in innings	8
10 wickets in match	1
Best bowling	8/72
Catches/stumpings	53/–
- Source: Cricinfo, 23 December 2009

James Daniel Piachaud (1 March 1937 – 2 April 2026) was a Sri Lankan first-class cricketer. He studied in England at the University of Oxford, where he made 52 appearances in first-class cricket — the joint-highest amount for the university — and took nearly 150 wickets as an off break bowler. Piachaud also played county cricket for Hampshire and first-class cricket for Ceylon.

== Biography ==
The son of James Arthur Piachaud, he was born in March 1937 at Colombo in what was then British Ceylon. He was educated at St Thomas' College, before matriculating to Keble College, Oxford. There, he was a member of the Oxford University Cricket Club and made his debut in first-class cricket for the club against Gloucestershire at Oxford in 1958, with him making fifteen appearances in his debut season. In these, he took 41 wickets at an average of 20.07, with two five wicket hauls against the Free Foresters; his 8 for 72 in their second innings was to become his career best bowling figures. He made the same number of appearances for Oxford University in 1959, taking 50 wickets at an average of 26.02, with three five wicket hauls. In 1960, he once again made fifteen appearances for Oxford, taking 47 wickets at an average of 22.89 and a further two five wicket hauls. Against Hampshire that season, he was struck for 28 runs off an over by Butch White, having bowled a dot ball followed by four sixes and a four.

Despite this, his bowling performances for Oxford brought him to the attention of Hampshire, for whom he played in the latter half of the 1960 County Championship, making twelve first-class appearances. Along with Charles Fry, he was the last amateur to be called into the Hampshire side. In these, he took 29 wickets at an average of 29.31, with best figures of 4 for 62. He did not feature for Hampshire in 1961, but did play seven final first-class matches for Oxford University. His 52 first-class appearances for Oxford is the joint-highest, alongside Abbas Ali Baig. He took 149 wickets for Oxford, at an average of 25.25 and took seven five wicket hauls. His tally is the fourth-highest number of wickets taken for Oxford in first-class cricket. As a batsman, he scored 926 runs at a batting average of 12.86 and a highest score of 40. Piachaud gained a blue in each of the four seasons in which he played for Oxford, by virtue of playing in The University Match against Cambridge University at Lord's. In 1961, he additionally played for the Gentlemen in the Gentlemen v Players fixture.

Piachaud first appeared for the Marylebone Cricket Club (MCC) in 1962, against Cambridge University. In April 1964, he toured India with E. W. Swanton's XI, during which he played in a first-class match against a strong Indian XI at Eden Gardens. In 1966, he played a second match for the MCC against Ireland at Dublin and appeared in the same fixture in 1968. In between these matches, he played for the Free Foresters in 1968 against Oxford University. He was selected to tour England with the Ceylon team in 1968, but the tour was cancelled just before it was due to begin. He would later represent Ceylon in one first-class cricket match, against a strong MCC side at Colombo in 1969; this marked his final first-class appearance. As an off break bowler, it was noted that he bowled particularly fast for a spin bowler, whilst utilising a skilful change of pace; coupled with a peculiar looping flight, he was said to be effective even on flat wickets. In his 71 appearances in first-class cricket, Piachaud took 205 wickets at an average of 24.73. As a batsman, he scored 1,037 runs at a batting average of 12.20.

In September 2018, he was one of 49 former Sri Lankan cricketers felicitated by Sri Lanka Cricket, to honour them for their services before Sri Lanka became a full member of the International Cricket Council (ICC).

Piachaud died at home on 2 April 2026, at the age of 89.
