= Michael James (cricketer, born 1934) =

English cricketer

Personal information
- Full name: Robert Michael James
- Born: 2 October 1934 (age 92); Wokingham, Berkshire, England
- Batting: Right-handed
- Bowling: Right-arm medium

Domestic team information
- Years: Team
- 1954–1971: Berkshire
- 1956–1958: Cambridge University
- 1964/65: Wellington

Career statistics
Competition	First-class
Matches	51
Runs scored	2,208
Batting average	27.60
100s/50s	4/5
Top score	168
Balls bowled	2,997
Wickets	38
Bowling average	35.68
5 wickets in innings	0
10 wickets in match	0
Best bowling	4/5
Catches/stumpings	16/–
- Source: CricketArchive, 6 February 2017

Robert Michael James (born 2 October 1934) is an English former cricketer who played first-class cricket from 1956 to 1965.

== Cricket career ==
Michael James was educated at St John's School, Leatherhead, and Trinity College, Cambridge. He was a regular member of the Cambridge University team from 1956 to 1958, scoring 1969 runs in 45 first-class matches at an average of 27.34. His highest score was 168 against Gloucestershire in 1957, when he "dominated the cricket, on-driving and pulling powerfully during a fine display lasting four hours and including six 6's and seventeen 4's". Cambridge won the match by an innings in two days.

In his second first-class match, James scored 116 in 188 minutes against the 1956 Australian team, after Cambridge University had trailed by 259 on the first innings. It was the first time a freshman had scored a century for either Cambridge or Oxford against an Australian team.

James played regularly for Berkshire in the Minor Counties Championship from 1954 to 1962, and a few matches from 1969 to 1971.

In 1963 James was appointed to the position of Third Secretary in the British High Commission in Wellington, New Zealand. He played three matches for Wellington in the Plunket Shield in 1964–65. He and his wife returned to England in 1965, with their two sons, and a daughter who had been born during their stay in New Zealand.

James' son Tim played for Berkshire in the 1980s.
