= Charles Toole (cricketer) =

English cricketer

Personal information
- Full name: Charles Laurence Toole
- Born: 9 January 1939 (age 87); Paddington, London, England
- Batting: Right-handed
- Bowling: Right-arm medium-fast

Domestic team information
- Years: Team
- 1967: Marylebone Cricket Club

Career statistics
Competition	First-class
Matches	1
Runs scored	78
Batting average	39.00
100s/50s	–/1
Top score	54
Balls bowled	120
Wickets	1
Bowling average	56.00
5 wickets in innings	–
10 wickets in match	–
Best bowling	1/31
Catches/stumpings	–/–
- Source: Cricinfo, 9 August 2021

Charles Laurence Toole (born 9 January 1939) is an English former first-class cricketer.

A club cricketer for Finchley Cricket Club, Toole was selected to play in a first-class cricket match for the Marylebone Cricket Club (MCC) on their tour of Scotland in 1967, playing against Scotland at Glasgow. Batting twice in the match, he was run out in the MCC first innings for 24 runs, while in their second innings he made 54 runs before being dismissed by Jimmy Allan. He took one wicket in the match with his right-arm medium-fast bowling, that of Douglas Barr in the Scottish second innings. He has served in an administrative capacity with Finchley Cricket Club as an honorary vice president of the club.
