= List of Cheshire County Cricket Club List A players =

Cheshire County Cricket Club played in 29 List A cricket matches between 1964 and 2004. This is a list of the players who appeared in those matches.

- Jhangir Abbas (1999) (Note: Born at Longsight in Manchester in 1970, Abbas played a single List A match for the county in 1999. He played three Minor Counties Championship and five Minor Counties Trophy matches for Cheshire between 1999 and 2002.)
- David Bailey (1981–1983)
- Andrew Batterley (2002)
- Jonathan Bean (1992–1999)
- Marlon Black (2003)
- Geoffrey Blackburn (1987–1988)
- Timothy Bostock (1992–1996)
- Steven Bramhall (1994–2001)
- Patrick Briggs (1968)
- Denton Brock (2000)
- Barrington Browne (2004)
- Paul Bryson (1995–2002)
- Ian Cockbain (1985–2001)
- Roy Collins (1964–1966)
- Bob Cooke (1981–1983)
- Philip Cottrell (1999)
- Ian Cowap (1981)
- Dennis Cox (1964–1966)
- Stephen Crawley (1986–1993)
- Neil Cross (1998–2003)
- Stuart Cummings (1986–1987)
- Mark Currie (2001–2002)
- Barney Cutbill (2002)
- Hugh de Prez (1987)
- Nafees Din (2002–2004) (Note: Din, who was born at Manchester in 1981, played four List A matches for Cheshire between 2002 and 2004, scoring 118 runs with a highest score of 75. He played for Worcestershire Second XI in 2000 and in the Second XI Trophy for Minor Counties under-25s in 2002 and 2003.)
- Philip Dunkley (1981)
- Simon Dyson (1989)
- Stewart Eaton (2001–2002)
- Jonathan Farrow (2002)
- Christopher Finegan (1992–2002)
- Robin Fisher (2001–2004)
- Grant Flower (1998)
- Geoff Foley (2000)
- Andrew Fox (1987–1989)
- Edward Garnet (1996)
- Ian Gemmell (1981–1983)
- Jonathan Gray (1993–1995)
- Andrew Greasley (1995–1996)
- Peter Hacker (1985)
- Andrew Hall (1994–2004)
- Christopher Hall (1999–2000)
- Norman Halsall (1964–1968)
- Stephen Hampson (1998)
- Gerry Hardstaff (1964–1968)
- Keith Harris (1982) (Note: A left-handed batsman, Harris scored 17 runs in his only List A appearance for the county. He was born at St Helens in 1957 and played eight Minor Counties Championship for the team between 1981 and 1983.)
- Richard Hignett (1993–2003)
- John J Hitchmough (1985–1992)
- John S Hitchmough (1982–1989)
- Kenneth Holding (1964–1968)
- Patrick Kelly (1964–1968)
- Martyn Knight (2002)
- Abey Kuruvilla (2001)
- Charles Lamb (1994–2001)
- David Leather (1999)
- Daniel Leech (2004)
- Bryan Lowe (1964)
- Mark Makin (2002)
- Simon Marshall (2001–2002)
- Pat McKeown (2001)
- Geoff Miller (1992–1994)
- Frederick Millett (1964–1968)
- Mudassar Nazar (1981–1988)
- Tony Murphy (1995–1999)
- John O'Brien (1987–1995)
- Neil O'Brien (1981–1989)
- Stephen Ogilby (2001–2004)
- David Parry (1985)
- Nigel Peel (1992–1996)
- David Pennett (2003–2004)
- Clinton Perren (2003–2004)
- James Pickup (1981–1985)
- John Potts (1992–1993)
- James Powell (2001) (Note: A right-arm medium-fast bowler from Wrexham, Powell took a single wicket in his only List A match for Cheshire. He played Minor Counties cricket for the team in 2001 and 2002 and made a single Second XI appearance for Kent in 2001.)
- Simon Renshaw (1994–2004)
- Ronald Richardson (1968)
- Richard Rodger (1982)
- Mark Saxelby (1996)
- Richard Shenton (2001)
- Anthony Shillinglaw (1964–1968)
- Paul Simmonite (1994) (Note: A right-handed batter who was born at Burnley in 1971, Simmonite scored two runs in his only List A appearance for Cheshire. He played in six Minor Counties Championship matches for the team, and played Second XI cricket for Lancashire, Derbyshire, Gloucestershire, Glamorgan, and Hampshire between 1989 and 1992.)
- Robert Simpson (1983)
- Donald Smith (1968)
- Neil Smith (1988–1989)
- Ian Spencer (2003)
- Timothy Standing (1992–1993)
- Stuart Stoneman (1998–2001)
- Arthur Sutton (1964–1986)
- Ian Tansley (1985–1988)
- Mike Taylor (1981)
- Timothy Taylor (1981)
- Keith Teasdale (1985–1987)
- Philip Thomas (2001)
- Paul Tipton (1982–1983)
- Simon Twigg (2003–2004)
- Eric Upashantha (2002)
- David Varey (1988–1992)
- Paul Wakefield (1983)
- Mike Watkinson (1982)
- Jason Whittaker (2001–2004)
- Barry Wood (1986–1989)
- Nathan Wood (2001)
- Stuart Wood (1966–1968)
- Steve Wundke (1982–1998)
- Stephen Yates (1985–1986)
