= Dunkley =

Dunkley or Dunckley is a surname. Notable people with the surname include:

- Albert Dunkley (1877–1949), English professional footballer
- Andrew Dunkley (born 1968), Australian rules footballer
- Archibald Dunkley, Rastafarian preacher
- Bob Dunkley, British competitive shooter
- Chey Dunkley (born 1992), English footballer
- Chris Dunkley, English playwright
- Errol Dunkley (born 1951), Jamaican reggae musician
- Fitzroy Dunkley (born 1993), Jamaican sprinter
- Frederick Dunkley (1862–1901), English cricketer
- Jo Dunkley (born 1979), British astrophysicist
- John Dunkley (1891–1947), Jamaican painter and sculptor
- Josh Dunkley (born 1997), Australian rules footballer, son of Andrew Dunkley
- Julie Dunkley (born 1979), English shot putter
- Julien Dunkley (born 1975), Jamaican track and field athlete
- Kenneth J. Dunkley (born 1939), American inventor
- Kyle Dunkley (born 2000), Australian rules footballer
- Lara Dunkley (born 1995), Australian netball player
- Lascelles Dunkley (born 1941), Jamaican former footballer and football manager
- Lisa Dunkley, American politician
- Lorna Dunkley (born 1972), British television news presenter
- Louisa Margaret Dunkley (1866–1927), Australian labor organizer
- Malcolm Dunkley (1961–2005), English footballer
- Maurice Dunkley (1914–1989), English footballer
- Michael Dunkley (born 1957), Bermudian politician and businessman
- Michelle Dunkley (born 1978), English high jumper
- Pat Dunkley (born 1972), Canadian former rugby union player
- Philip Dunkley (born 1951), English cricketer
- Robert Dunkley (footballer) (1922–2000), English footballer
- Robert Dunkley (sailor) (born 1949), Bahamian sailor
- Sophia Dunkley (born 1998), English cricketer
- Spencer Dunkley (born 1969), British basketball player and coach
- Suzanne Dunkley (born 1956), Bermudian equestrian

== See also ==
- Division of Dunkley, Victoria, Australia - named for Louisa Margaret Dunkley
- Dunckley, Colorado
- Dunckley Pass, Colorado
- Dorothy Dunckley (1890–1972), Australian make-up artist etc.
- Henry Dunckley (1823–1896), English Baptist minister, journalist and newspaper editor
- Dunkerley (disambiguation)
