= 1964 Gillette Cup =

- Administrator: MCC
- Cricket format: Limited overs cricket (60 overs per innings)
- Tournament format: Knockout
- Champions: Sussex (2nd title)
- Participants: 22
- Matches: 21
- Most runs: 256 – John Edrich (Surrey)
- Most wickets: 12 – Khalid Ibadulla (Warwickshire)

The 1964 Gillette Cup was the second Gillette Cup, an English limited overs county cricket tournament. It was held between 25 April and 5 September 1964, and was won by the defending champions Sussex.

== First round ==
25 April 1964
Scorecard

| Worcestershire; 119 (54.4 overs) | v | Glamorgan; 120/9 (59.4 overs) |
| Don Kenyon 42; Don Shepherd 3/12 (13) | | Euros Lewis 28; Jack Flavell 4/25 (13) |

Glamorgan won by 1 wicket
Rodney Parade, Newport
Umpires: Jack Crapp and Fred Gardner
Player of the match: Don Shepherd (Glam)

30 April 1964
Scorecard

| Essex; 182/8 (60 overs) | v | Cambridgeshire; 151 (57.4 overs) |
| Geoff Smith 63; Derek Wing 3/42 (13) | | Terry Hale 51; Trevor Bailey 4/37 (12) |

Essex won by 31 runs
Spicer's Sports Ground, Sawston
Umpires: Lofty Herman and Ron Lay
Player of the match: Trevor Bailey (Essex)

2 May 1964
Scorecard

| Northamptonshire; 165 (58.4 overs) | v | Derbyshire; 130 (56.3 overs) |
| Roger Prideaux 29; William Richardson 4/49 (11.4) | | Charles Lee 42; Malcolm Scott 2/23 (8) |

Northamptonshire won by 35 runs
County Cricket Ground, Northampton
Umpires: Arthur Jepson and Ron Lay
Player of the match: Derek Morgan (Derbys)

- Match extended into a second day (4 May), Northamptonshire were 165 all out at the end of the first day's play.

2 May 1964
Scorecard

| Hampshire; 201 (59.4 overs) | v | Wiltshire; 81 (42.4 overs) |
| Mike Barnard 55; Anthony Marshall 3/36 (13) | | Anthony Smith 34; Bob Cottam 4/9 (10) |

Hampshire won by 120 runs
Hardenhuish Park, Chippenham
Umpires: Syd Buller and Charlie Elliott
Player of the match: Bob Cottam (Hants)

- Match extended into a second day (4 May) after the original match day at Swindon was washed out.

4 May 1964
Scorecard

| Hertfordshire; 63 (30.4 overs) | v | Durham; 65/3 (16.3 overs) |
| Robin Marques 10; Stuart Young 4/13 (8.4) | | Clive Leach 27*; Robin Marques 1/13 (5) |

Durham won by 7 wickets
Feethams, Darlington
Umpires: Freddie Jakeman and Tom Spencer
Player of the match: Stuart Young (Durham)

6 May 1964
Scorecard

| Surrey; 171/8 (60 overs) | v | Cheshire; 109 (55.3 overs) |
| John Edrich 70; Norman Halsall 2/37 (13) | | Roy Collins 58; David Sydenham 4/6 (9) |

Surrey won by 62 runs
Ellerman Lines Cricket Ground, Hoylake
Umpires: Tom Drinkwater and Eddie Phillipson
Player of the match: David Sydenham (Surrey)

- David Sydenham took four wickets in five balls during Cheshire's innings, including a hat-trick.

== Second round ==
27 May 1964
Scorecard

| Glamorgan; 208/9 (60 overs) | v | Essex; 201 (59.1 overs) |
| Jim Pressdee 60; Colin Hilton 4/47 (13) | | Geoff Smith 53; Don Shepherd 3/52 (13) |

Glamorgan won by 7 runs
The Gnoll, Neath
Umpires: John Arnold and Eddie Phillipson
Player of the match: Jim Pressdee (Glam)

27 May 1964
Scorecard

| Kent; 166 (57.3 overs) | v | Lancashire; 170/3 (41.1 overs) |
| Peter Jones 73; Ken Higgs 3/29 (13) | | David Green 97; Colin Cowdrey 1/0 (1) |

Lancashire won by 7 wickets
Old Trafford, Manchester
Umpires: Ron Aspinall and Ron Lay
Player of the match: David Green (Lancs)

27 May 1964
Scorecard

| Leicestershire; 56 (26.2 overs) | v | Northamptonshire; 59/0 (13.5 overs) |
| Paul Munden 15; David Larter 5/24 (13) | | Michael Norman 37* |

Northamptonshire won by 10 wickets
Grace Road, Leicester
Umpires: Lofty Herman and Tom Spencer
Player of the match: David Larter (Northants)

27 May 1964
Scorecard

| Middlesex; 151 (52.2 overs) | v | Yorkshire; 90 (46 overs) |
| Peter Parfitt 37; Ken Taylor 3/19 (11) | | Ray Illingworth 23; Don Bennett 3/23 (13) |

Middlesex won by 61 runs
Lord's Cricket Ground, London
Umpires: Paul Gibb and Jim Parks, Sr.
Player of the match: Fred Titmus (Middx)

27 May 1964
Scorecard

| Nottinghamshire; 215 (58.2 overs) | v | Somerset; 215/9 (60 overs) |
| Maurice Hill 107; Geoff Hall 3/55 (13) | | Graham Atkinson 69; Ian Davison 4/34 |

Somerset won by losing fewer wickets
County Ground, Taunton
Umpires: John Langridge and David Smith
Player of the match: Maurice Hill (Notts)

27 May 1964
Scorecard

| Surrey; 268/6 (60 overs) | v | Gloucestershire; 222 (59.5 overs) |
| John Edrich 96; David Smith 2/66 (13) | | David Smith 45; Roger Harman 3/50 (8.5) |

Surrey won by 46 runs
The Oval, London
Umpires: Tom Drinkwater and Hugo Yarnold
Player of the match: John Edrich (Surrey)

27 May 1964
Scorecard

| Sussex; 293/5 (60 overs) | v | Durham; 93 (29.5 overs) |
| Jim Parks, Jr. 102*; Stuart Young 3/39 (13) | | Alan Burridge 28; Tony Buss 4/31 (8.5) |

Sussex won by 200 runs
County Cricket Ground, Hove
Umpires: Bill Copson and Arthur Fagg
Player of the match: Jim Parks, Jr. (Sussex)

27 May 1964
Scorecard

| Warwickshire; 307/8 (60 overs) | v | Hampshire; 129 (43 overs) |
| John Jameson 100*; Bob Cottam 3/39 (13) | | Roy Marshall 28; Khalid Ibadulla 3/43 (13) |

Warwickshire won by 178 runs
Edgbaston, Birmingham
Umpires: Jack Crapp and Arthur Jepson
Player of the match: John Jameson (Warks)

== Quarter-finals ==
24 June 1964
Scorecard

| Glamorgan; 220/6 (60 overs) | v | Lancashire; 223/4 (55.4 overs) |
| Peter Walker 62*; Peter Marner 2/34 (11) | | Geoff Pullar 77; Ossie Wheatley 2/48 (11) |

Lancashire won by 6 wickets
Old Trafford, Manchester
Umpires: Freddie Jakeman and Arthur Jepson
Player of the match: Ken Grieves (Lancs)

24 June 1964
Scorecard

| Warwickshire; 300/8 (60 overs) | v | Northamptonshire; 153 (34.5 overs) |
| Bob Barber 114; Jim Watts 4/48 (13) | | Roger Prideaux 58*; Khalid Ibadulla 5/34 (11) |

Warwickshire won by 147 runs
County Cricket Ground, Northampton
Umpires: Bill Copson and Fred Gardner
Player of the match: Bob Barber (Warks)

24 June 1964
Scorecard

| Sussex; 141 (54.5 overs) | v | Somerset; 125 (54.4 overs) |
| Graham Cooper 58; Geoff Hall 5/34 (13) | | Roy Virgin 54; Don Bates 4/28 (8.4) |

Sussex won by 16 runs
County Ground, Taunton
Umpires: Charlie Elliott and Hugo Yarnold
Player of the match: Geoff Hall (Somst)

24 June 1964
Scorecard

| Surrey; 236/8 (60 overs) | v | Middlesex; 122 (41.1 overs) |
| John Edrich 70; Peter Parfitt 3/38 (13) | | Peter Parfitt 33; Stewart Storey 5/35 (13) |

Surrey won by 114 runs
The Oval, London
Umpires: John Arnold and Paul Gibb
Player of the match: Stewart Storey (Surrey)

== Semi-finals ==
29 July 1964
Scorecard

| Warwickshire; 294/7 (60 overs) | v | Lancashire; 209/7 (60 overs) |
| Bob Barber 76; Sonny Ramadhin 2/51 (11) | | David Green 69; Khalid Ibadulla 3/55 (13) |

Warwickshire won by 85 runs
Old Trafford, Manchester
Umpires: Dusty Rhodes and Tom Spencer
Player of the match: M. J. K. Smith (Warks)

29 July 1964
Scorecard

| Sussex; 215/8 (60 overs) | v | Surrey; 125 (46.5 overs) |
| Ted Dexter 84; David Gibson 2/27 (13) | | Stewart Storey 24; Ian Thomson 3/17 (9.5) |

Sussex won by 90 runs
County Cricket Ground, Hove
Umpires: Arthur Fagg and Lofty Herman
Player of the match: Ted Dexter (Sussex)

== Final ==
5 September 1964
Scorecard

| Warwickshire; 127 (48 overs) | v | Sussex; 131/2 (41.2 overs) |
| Alan Smith 35*; Ian Thomson 4/23 (13) | | Les Lenham 47; Khalid Ibadulla 1/28 (10) |

Sussex won by 8 wickets
Lord's Cricket Ground, London
Umpires: Arthur Fagg and Dusty Rhodes
Player of the match: Ian Thomson (Sussex)
