= John Hitchmough =

John Hitchmough may refer to:

- John Hitchmough (cricketer, born 1958), former English cricketer
- John Hitchmough (cricketer, born 1962), former English cricketer
