= Hitchmough =

Hitchmough is a surname. Notable people with the surname include:

- Jim Hitchmough (1934–1997), TV comedy writer, teacher, and academic
- John Hitchmough (born 1958), English cricketer
- John Hitchmough (born 1962), English cricketer
