= Dennis Cox =

English cricketer and cricket administrator

Personal information
- Full name: Dennis Frank Cox
- Born: 21 December 1925; Bermondsey, London, England
- Died: 22 February 2001 (aged 75); Chislehurst, Kent, England
- Batting: Right-handed
- Bowling: Right-arm fast-medium

Domestic team information
- Years: Team
- 1961–1967: Cheshire
- 1949–1957: Surrey

Career statistics
Competition	First-class	List A
Matches	42	2
Runs scored	660	2
Batting average	18.85	1.00
100s/50s	–/4	–/–
Top score	57	2
Balls bowled	4,865	78
Wickets	68	–
Bowling average	34.05	–
5 wickets in innings	2	–
10 wickets in match	1	–
Best bowling	7/22	–
Catches/stumpings	39/–	1/–
- Source: Cricinfo, 4 October 2011

Dennis Frank Cox (21 December 1925 – 22 February 2001) was an English cricketer and cricket administrator. Cox was a right-handed batsman who bowled right-arm fast-medium. He was born in Bermondsey, London.

Cox made his first-class debut for Surrey against the Marylebone Cricket Club in 1949. He made 41 further first-class appearances for the county, the last of which came against Gloucestershire in 1957 County Championship. In his 41 first-class appearances for the university, he scored a total of 660 runs at an average of 18.85, with a high score of 57. This score, was of four fifties he made, came against Gloucestershire in 1955. With the ball, he took 68 wickets at a bowling average of 34.05, with best figures of 7/22. One of two five wicket hauls, these figures came against Cambridge University in 1952, with him taking match figures of 11/70. He left Surrey at the end of the 1958 season.

He proceeded to join Cheshire in the 1961 Minor Counties Championship against Staffordshire. He played Minor counties cricket for Cheshire from 1961 to 1967. He made two List A appearances for Cheshire. The first of these came against Surrey in the 1964 Gillette Cup. Again his former county, he went wicket-less and was dismissed for a duck by David Sydenham. His second of these came against Lancashire in the 1965 Gillette Cup. Cox didn't bowl in this match, while with the bat he scored 2 runs before being dismissed by Ken Higgs.

He later served at the President of Surrey County Cricket Club, in doing so becoming only the fourth former professional cricketer to do so. He died at Chislehurst, Kent on 22 February 2001.
