= Nathan Wood (cricketer) =

English cricketer (born 1974)

Personal information
- Full name: Nathan Theodore Wood
- Born: 4 October 1974 (age 52); Thornhill Edge, Yorkshire, England
- Nickname: Woody, Nagga
- Height: 5 ft 7 in (1.70 m)
- Batting: Left-handed
- Bowling: Right-arm medium
- Role: Opening batsman
- Relatives: Barry Wood (father); Ronald Wood (uncle)

Domestic team information
- Years: Team
- 2001: Cheshire
- 1992–2000: Lancashire

Career statistics
Competition	First-class	List A
Matches	30	2
Runs scored	1,179	73
Batting average	29.47	36.50
100s/50s	1/5	–/1
Top score	155	50
Balls bowled	92	–
Wickets	–	–
Bowling average	n/a	–
5 wickets in innings	–	–
10 wickets in match	–	–
Best bowling	0/36	–
Catches/stumpings	5/–	–/–
- Source: Cricinfo, 31 October 2011

Nathan Theodore Wood (born 4 October 1974) is a former English cricketer. Wood was a left-handed batsman who bowled right-arm medium. He was born at Thornhill Edge, Yorkshire.

== Domestic playing career ==
=== Young England ===
Wood represented Young England at U14, U15 and U17 levels, and played in 4 Youth Tests and a Youth One Day International for England Under-19s in 1993 against the West Indies and in 1994 against Sri Lanka. Wood toured twice with the England U18's to South Africa and Denmark, and once with the England U19's to Sri Lanka scoring 53 in the First Test at Columbo and sharing a century opening stand with Michael Vaughan.

=== Lancashire C.C.C ===
Wood joined the Old Trafford playing staff in 1992 making his second XI debut against Kent, and was a member of the 1997 County Championship winning side. In the mid-nineties, Wood and Patrick McKeown developed a formidable opening partnership and in 1996 shared a record opening partnership of 341. He played in 91 second XI championship games, with a top score of 140 versus Kent at Canterbury, and 49 second XI one-day cup games with a highest score of 118 against Durham at Sunderland.

Wood made his first-class cricket debut for Lancashire against Essex in the 1996 County Championship. After fielding for 139 overs, witnessing Essex compile 509 (Graham Gooch 101, Paul Grayson 129, Stuart Law 144), Wood opened the batting with Nick Speak and was caught behind for 1 off Ashley Cowan. He made no further appearances in the 1996 season, but scored 48 not out on his return to the side the following year against Northamptonshire at Old Trafford. The following month he recorded his maiden first-class half century against Middlesex at Uxbridge, scoring 67 against a bowling attack which included Angus Fraser, Jacques Kallis, Phil Tufnell and Richard Johnson. In the next match he shared a 158 run partnership with Graham Lloyd (82 and 90 respectively) – a Lancashire innings where Andrew Flintoff scored his maiden first-class century (117). He kept his place in the side for the remainder of the season and in the subsequent game against Warwickshire at Blackpool led Lancashire to victory, top scoring with 26. Wood faced virtually every ball of a hostile 16 over bowling spell from South African fast bowler Allan Donald, setting up Lancashire's successful run chase of 91 with only three wickets intact. In the penultimate match of the 1997 County Championship versus Surrey at The Oval, Wood top scored hitting 155, sharing a record opening partnership against Surrey of 259 with Mike Atherton (149). Wood was the top scorer against Surrey in the 1998 County Championship match at Old Trafford guiding Lancashire to victory with 80 not out in the 2nd innings, during which Andrew Flintoff smashed 34 in one over off Alex Tudor. Lancashire then travelled to Edgbaston and Wood again top scored with 79 in Lancashire's successful run chase against Warwickshire. He was then dropped from the team, only returning as cover for Mike Atherton when he was on international duty. He recorded one further first-class half century (82 v Leicestershire at Grace Road), against a strong international seam attack consisting of Michael Kasprowicz, Alan Mullally and Chris Lewis.

Wood's final first-class appearance for Lancashire came against Derbyshire in the 2000 County Championship. He could perhaps consider himself unlucky for not playing more, but such was the strength of the Lancashire batting line up at that time it boasted several international batsmen including Mike Atherton, John Crawley, Sourav Ganguly, Neil Fairbrother, Wasim Akram and Andrew Flintoff amongst others. His difficulty in breaking into this powerful batting line up was highlighted in 1996 when, despite scoring over 1,000 runs at an average of 50, he was restricted to only one first-class appearance. In 30 first-class matches he scored 1,179 runs at an average of 29.47, with a highest score of 155 against Surrey at The Oval in 1997. Wood also made 5 first-class fifties, opening the batting in every innings he played. He made a single Lancashire List A appearance against Sussex in the televised floodlit 1998 AXA League match, completing a run out and scoring 23 runs before being dismissed by Richard Davis. He figured in three further one-day games for Lancashire, including the MTN International Challenge semi-final against Western Province at Newlands, Cape Town.

=== Cheshire C.C.C ===
He left Lancashire at the end of the 2000 season and proceeded to join Cheshire for the 2001 season. He made a single Minor Counties Championship appearance against Oxfordshire scoring 83 in the first innings and 57 in the second innings and a single MCCA Knockout Trophy appearance against the Derbyshire Cricket Board. In September 2001, Wood made a single List A appearance for the county against Cornwall in the 2nd round of the 2002 Cheltenham & Gloucester Trophy which was held in 2001 to avoid fixture congestion the following season. He scored 50 runs in this match, before being dismissed by Steven Pope. 2001 was his final season with Cheshire, whereupon he retired from professional cricket.

=== Cricket-playing relations ===
His father, Barry, played Test cricket for England and first-class cricket for Yorkshire, Lancashire and Derbyshire, while his uncle, Ronald, played first-class cricket for Yorkshire.

== Coaching career ==
Post cricket, Wood went into personal coaching where he founded and managed numerous businesses spanning fitness, sport and business. During this time he returned to cricket, which included a stint with Lancashire County Cricket Club as a pathway coach, and qualifying as an ECB Level 4 Master Coach. Subsequently he launched Nathan Wood Consulting, a private business offering coaching and mentoring services to athletes, coaches, and sporting organisations.

=== ECB ===
In 2018, Wood was appointed International & Specialist Coach Development Lead at the England and Wales Cricket Board (ECB), and was promoted to Interim Head of Coach Development in 2022. He left the ECB in 2024.
