= Ellerman Lines Cricket Ground =

Former cricket ground in Wirral, England

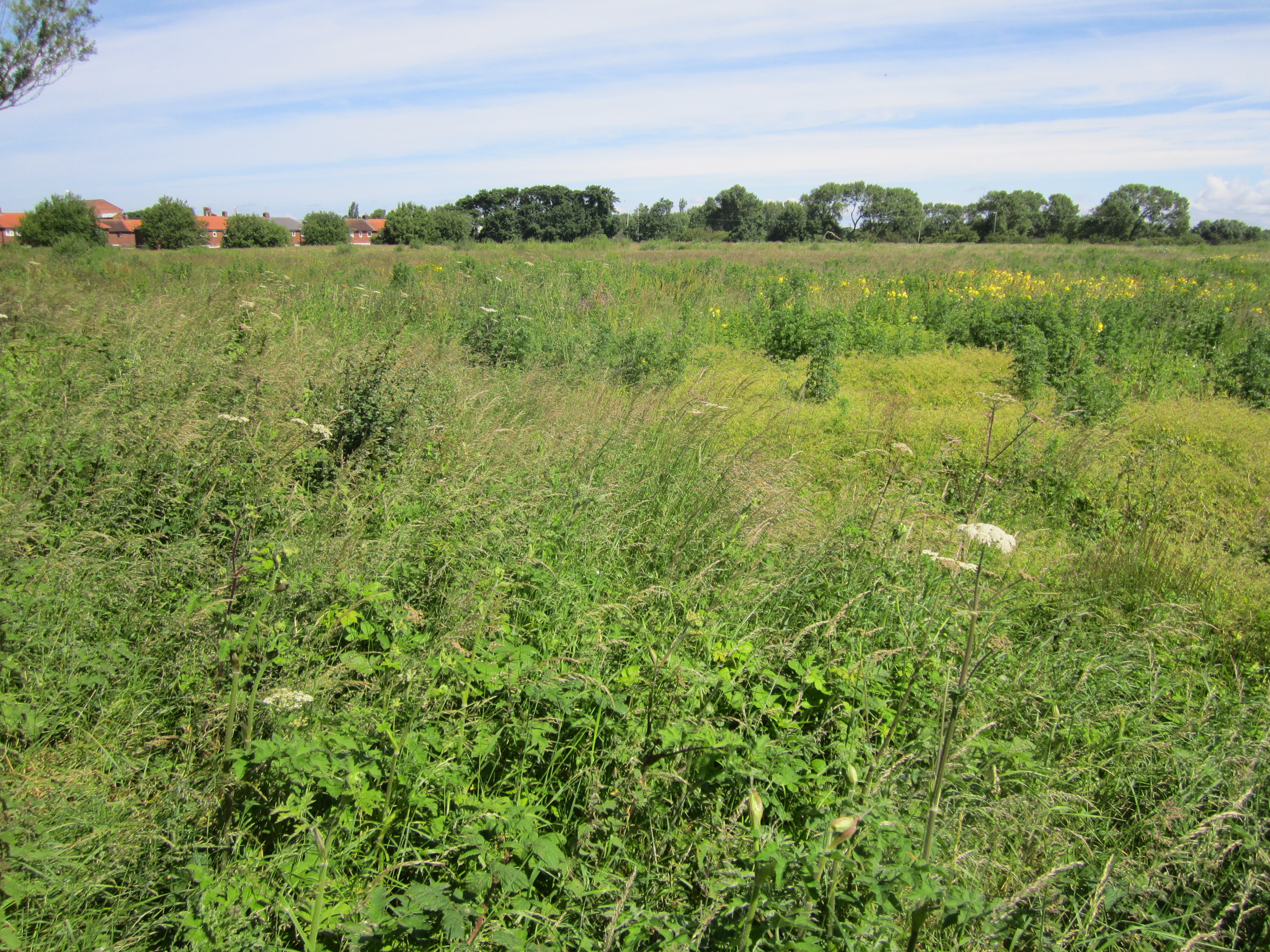
- Interactive map of Ellerman Lines Cricket Ground

Ground information
- Location: Hoylake, Cheshire
- Country: England
- Coordinates: 53.3897°N 3.1693°W
- Establishment: 1920s

Team information
Cheshire	(1957–1968)
- As of 12 July 2012; Source: Ground profile

Ellerman Lines Cricket Ground was a cricket ground at the end of Carr Lane in Hoylake, Cheshire, now in Merseyside. The ground was surrounded by countryside on at least three sides, with the houses in George Road along the western flank of the ground built at some point during the period when the ground was in use. The cricket ground has been disused for approximately forty years.

== History ==
The ground was the original home of West Wirral Cricket Club when it formed in the 1920s. By 1952, the club was struggling with the upkeep costs associated with the ground, and sold it to shipping company Ellerman Lines. Ellerman Lines made a significant investment in the ground, transforming it into their social club. The original cricket club moved to a different ground, but the cricket oval itself was retained. Cheshire first played minor counties cricket at the ground in the 1957 Minor Counties Championship against Northumberland. With the exception of 1958, Cheshire played one Minor Counties Championship match annually there, with their final match in 1968 coming against the Yorkshire Second XI. A single List A match was played there in the first round of the 1964 Gillette Cup between Cheshire and Surrey, in what was Cheshire's first appearance in List A cricket. Surrey won the toss and elected to bat first, making 171/8 in their innings, with John Edrich top-scoring with 70, while Norman Halsall was the most effective Cheshire bowler with figures of 2/37 from thirteen overs. Cheshire were dismissed for 109 in their chase, with Roy Collins top-scoring with 58. David Sydenham took figures of 4/6 from nine overs, including 4 wickets in 5 balls, which included a hat-trick. This was the second hat-trick to be taken in List A cricket. (Note: David Larter took the first hat-trick in List A cricket for Northamptonshire against Sussex in the 1963 Gillette Cup.)

Cricket ceased to be played at the ground in the early 1970s, with its use as a social club continuing for a short time thereafter. By the late 1970s, Ellerman Lines were struggling financially, with the ground being sold off around this time. The social club was subsequently transformed into a nightclub by its new owners, however this venture too failed. In 1985 the playing field served as a training ground for the Wirral Wolves American Football club and was being considered as a potential venue for their home fixtures only for a site in Arrowe Park to be preferred. The main building later caught fire and was demolished. The top soil was stripped from the site at some point, with rubble and other materials dumped on the site. In November 2011, a plan was drawn up to develop the site with 62 affordable homes. This plan met with some local controversy, with some local Councillors seeing it as a threat to plans to develop a new golf resort in the vicinity. Planning permission for these 62 properties, and a revised plan for 26 homes, were refused. In 2020 a further planning proposal was submitted for 30 semi-detached bungalows and up to 61 assisted living retirement apartments.

== Records ==
=== List A ===
- Highest team total: 171/8 (60 overs) by Surrey v Cheshire, 1964
- Lowest team total: 109 all out (55.3 overs), as above
- Highest individual innings: 70 by John Edrich, as above
- Best bowling in an innings: 4/6 by David Sydenham, as above

== Gallery ==
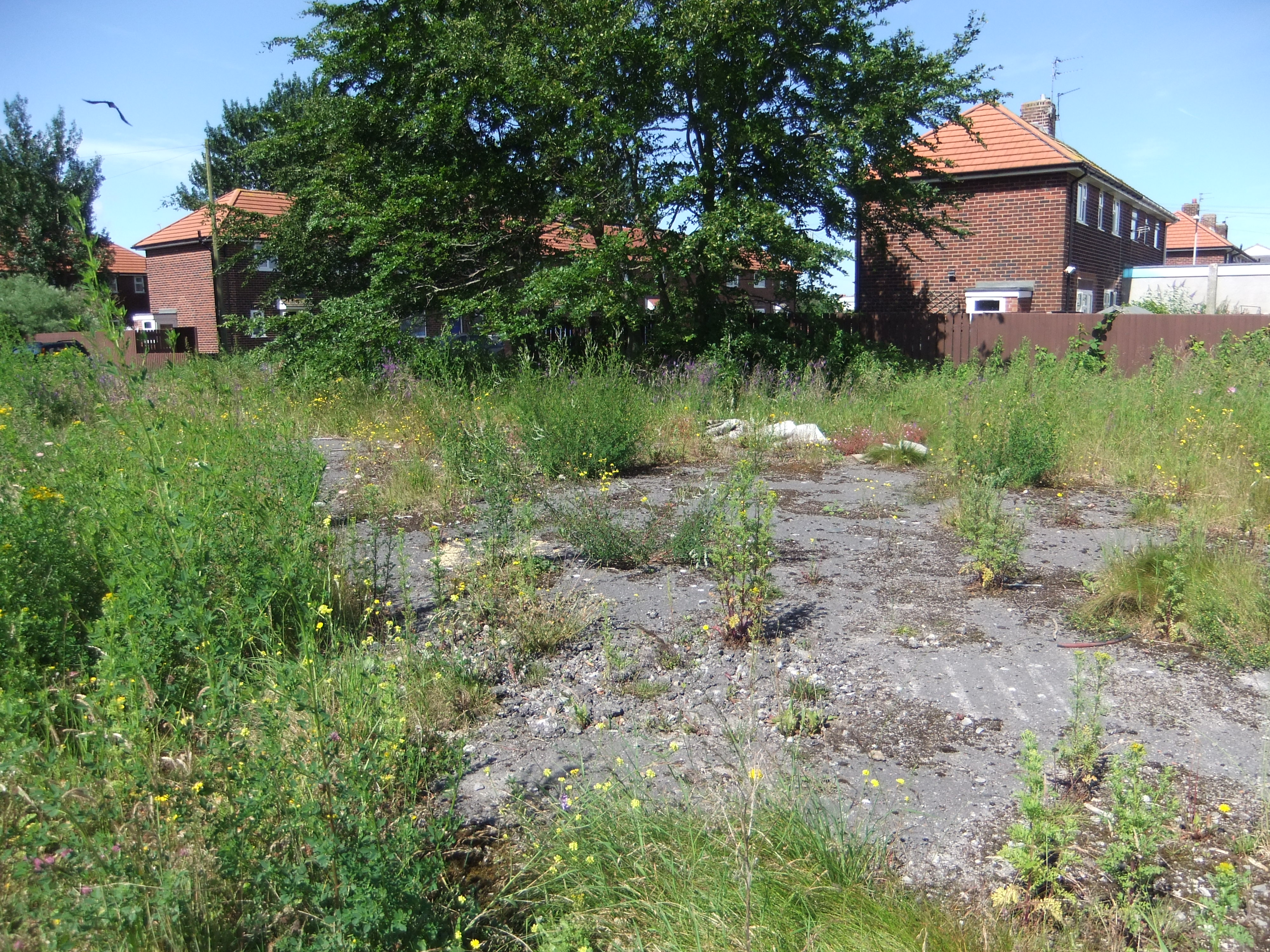
Former entrance to the ground.

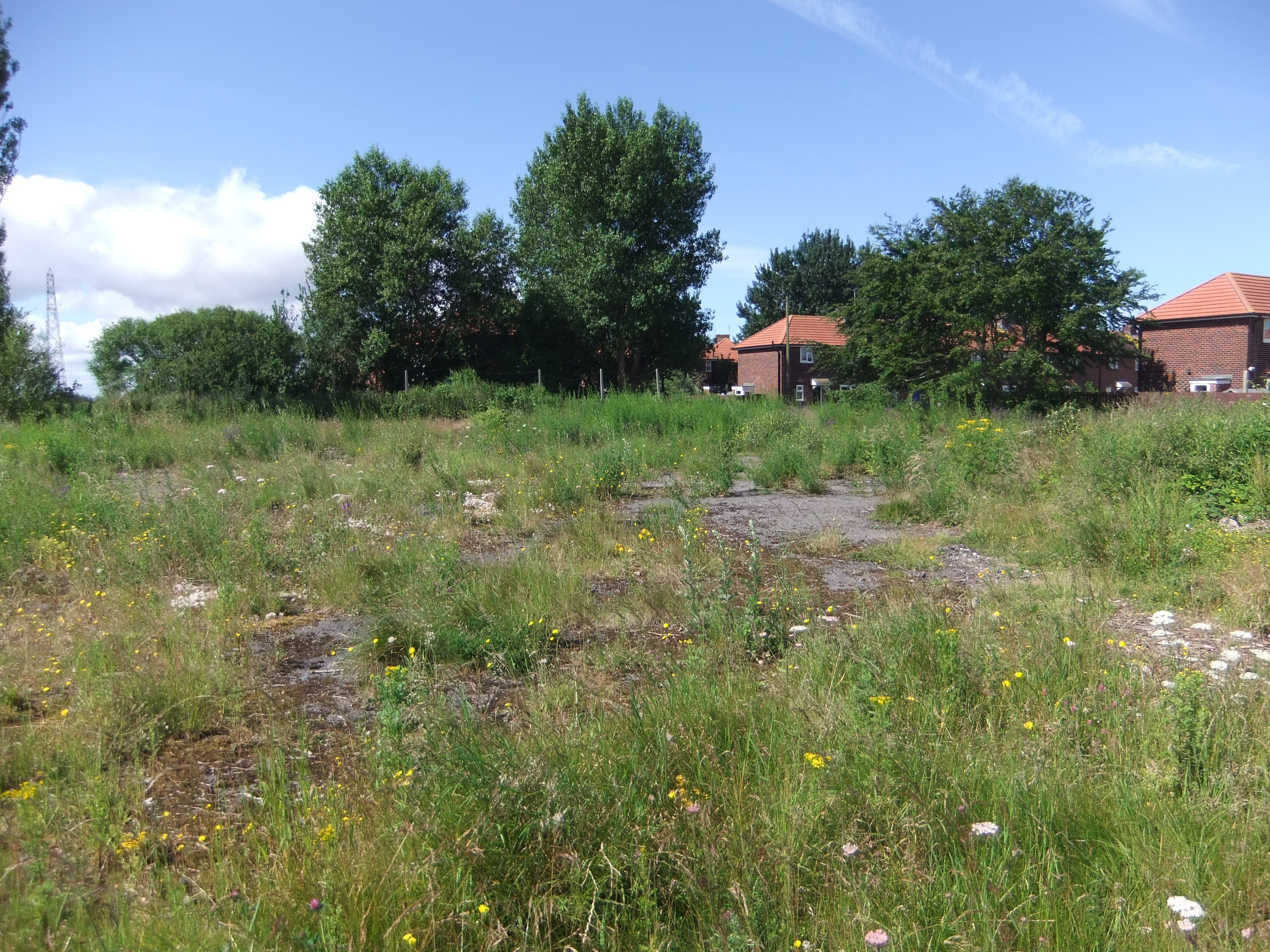
Possible location of the social club building.

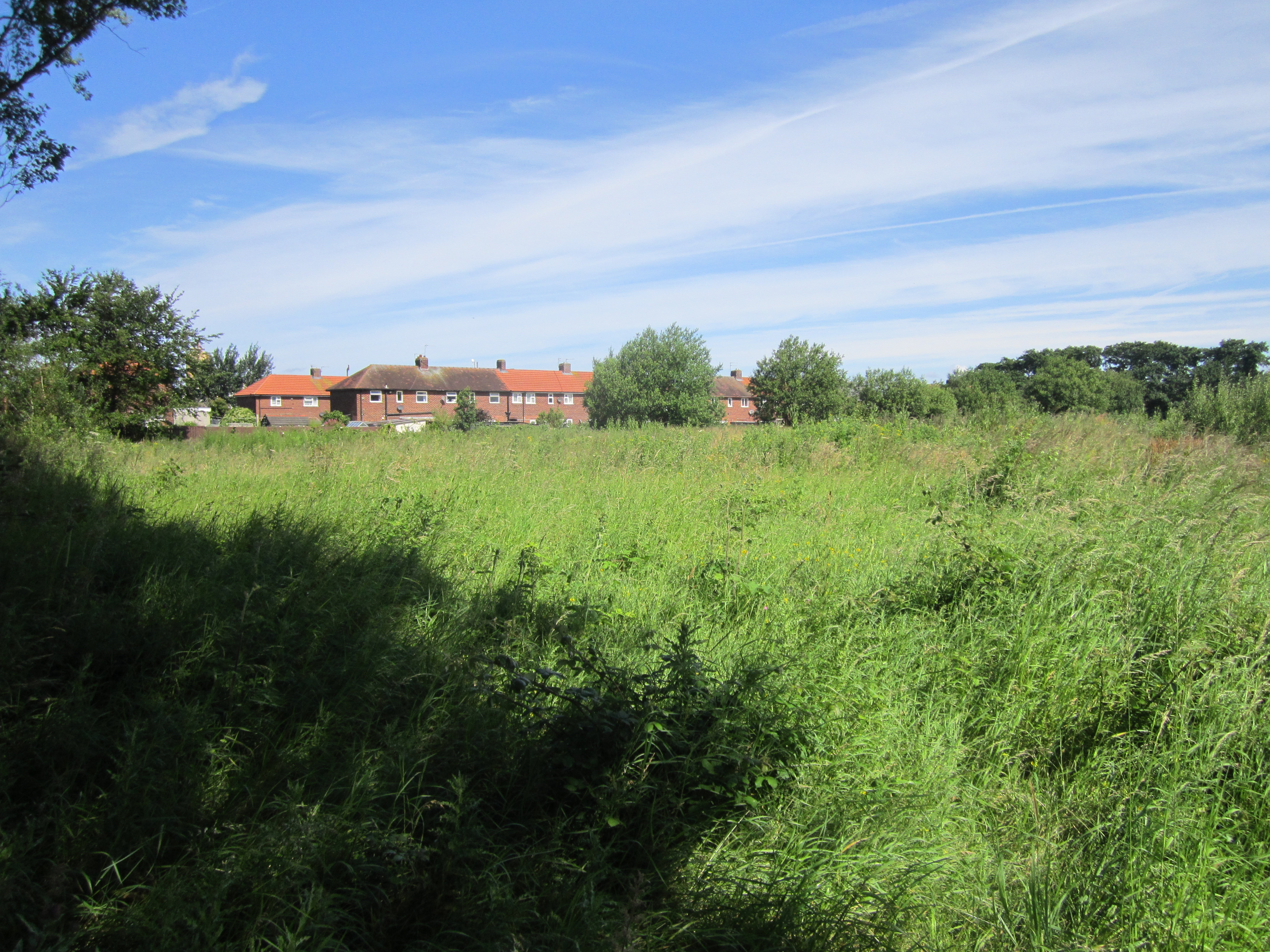
View of the ground looking north–west.

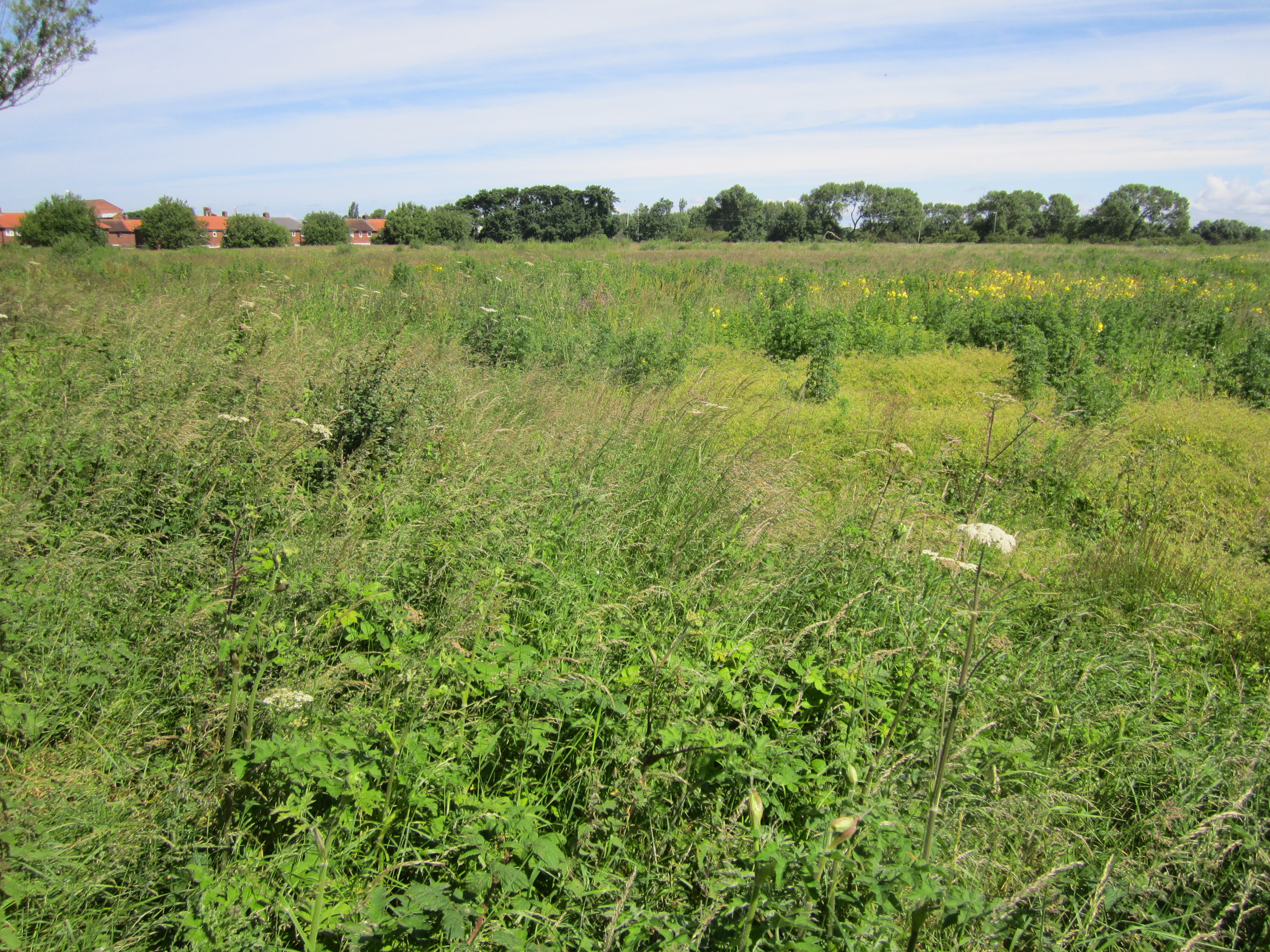
Wider view of the ground looking north–west.

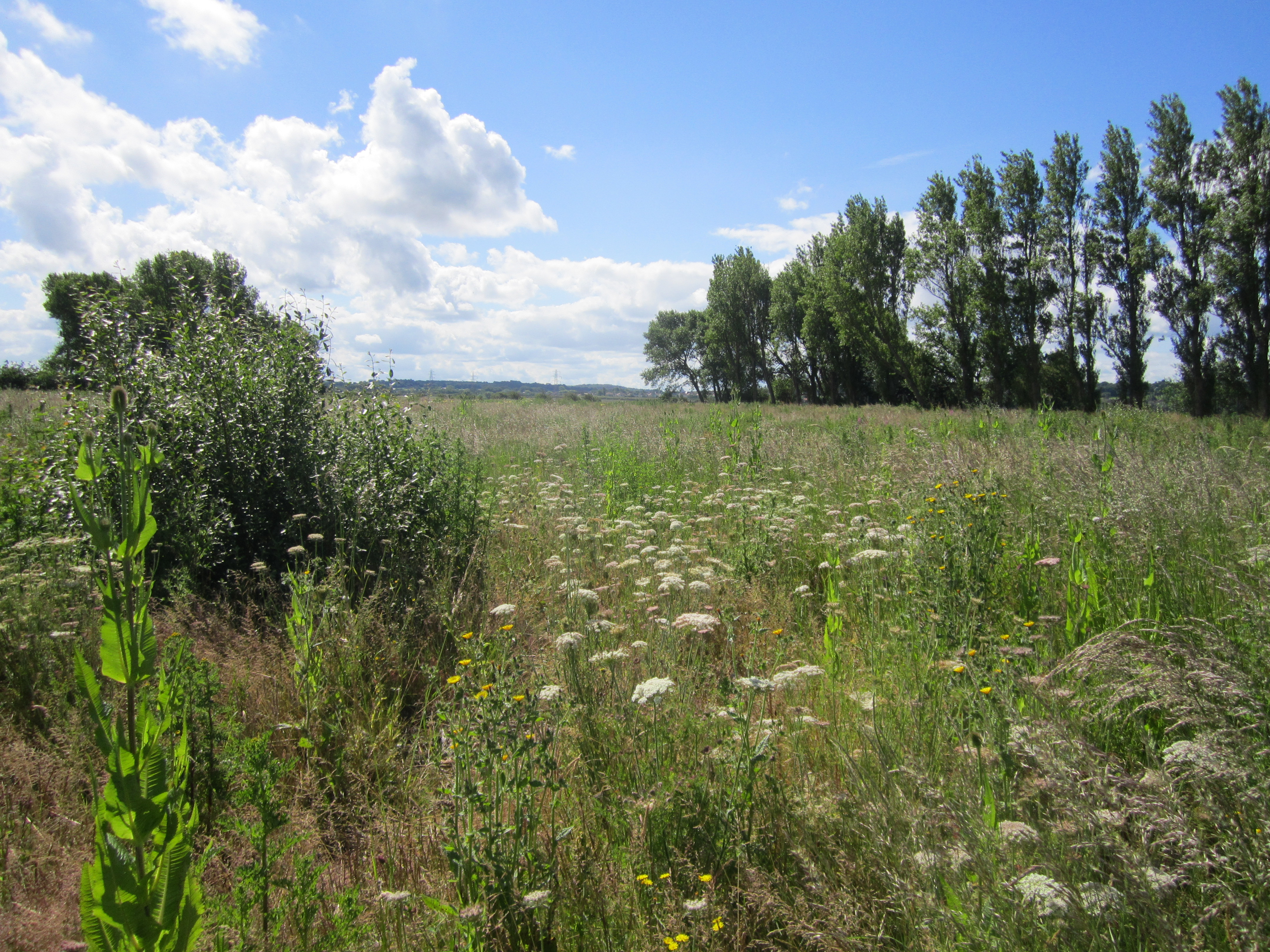
View of the ground looking south–east.

== See also ==
- List of cricket grounds in England and Wales
