= Kenneth Holding =

English cricketer

Personal information
- Full name: Kenneth Frank Holding
- Born: 25 June 1915; Bolton, Lancashire, England
- Died: 14 June 1997 (aged 81); Chelford, Cheshire, England
- Batting: Right-handed
- Role: Wicket-keeper

Domestic team information
- Years: Team
- 1955–1971: Cheshire

Career statistics
Competition	List A
Matches	4
Runs scored	12
Batting average	12.20
100s/50s	–/–
Top score	5*
Balls bowled	–
Wickets	–
Bowling average	–
5 wickets in innings	–
10 wickets in match	–
Best bowling	–
Catches/stumpings	2/–
- Source: Cricinfo, 13 April 2011

Kenneth Frank Holding (25 June 1915 – 14 June 1997) was an English cricketer. Holding was a right-handed batsman who fielded as a wicket-keeper. He was born in Bolton, Lancashire.

Holding made his debut for Cheshire in the 1955 Minor Counties Championship against Northumberland. Holding played Minor counties cricket for Cheshire from 1955 to 1971, which included 77 Minor Counties Championship matches. In 1964, he made his List A debut against Surrey in the Gillette Cup. He played three further List A matches for Cheshire, the last coming against Northamptonshire in the 1968 Gillette Cup. In his four List A matches, he scored 12 runs at a batting average of 12.00, with a high score of 5*.

He died in Chelford, Cheshire on 14 June 1997.
