= Philip Thomas (cricketer) =

English cricketer (born 1978)

Personal information
- Full name: Philip Anthony Thomas
- Born: 17 August 1978 (age 48); Liverpool, Lancashire, England
- Batting: Right-handed
- Bowling: Slow left-arm orthodox

Domestic team information
- Years: Team
- 2000–2001: Cheshire

Career statistics
Competition	List A
Matches	1
Runs scored	–
Batting average	–
100s/50s	–/–
Top score	–
Balls bowled	48
Wickets	2
Bowling average	24.00
5 wickets in innings	–
10 wickets in match	–
Best bowling	2/48
Catches/stumpings	–/–
- Source: Cricinfo, 7 April 2011

Philip Anthony Thomas (born 17 August 1978) is an English cricketer. Thomas is a right-handed batsman who bowls slow left-arm orthodox. He was born in Liverpool, Lancashire.

Thomas made his debut for Cheshire in the 2000 MCCA Knockout Trophy against the Derbyshire Cricket Board. He played a further Knockout Trophy match in 2000, against the Nottinghamshire Cricket Board. In that same season he played his only Minor Counties Championship match against Wales Minor Counties. The following season, he made his only List A appearance against Cornwall in the 2nd round of the 2002 Cheltenham & Gloucester Trophy which was played in 2001. In this match he wasn't required to bat, but with the ball he did take 2 wickets for the cost of 48 runs. His wickets were those of James Hands and Benjamin Price.
