= Martin Knight =

Martin Knight may refer to:

- Martin Knight (author) (born 1957), British author
- Martin Knight (cricketer) (born 1984), English cricketer
- Martin Knight (squash player) (born 1983), New Zealand squash player
- Martin Knight (rower) (born 1957), British rower
- Martin Knight (rugby union) (1955–1984), Australian rugby union player
