= Pat McKeown =

English cricketer (born 1976)

Personal information
- Full name: Patrick Christopher McKeown
- Born: 1 June 1976 (age 50); Liverpool, Lancashire, England
- Batting: Right-handed
- Bowling: Right-arm off break

Domestic team information
- Years: Team
- 2001: Cheshire
- 1996–2000: Lancashire

Career statistics
Competition	First-class	List A
Matches	19	21
Runs scored	679	346
Batting average	26.11	16.47
100s/50s	–/3	–/1
Top score	75	69
Balls bowled	–	62
Wickets	–	–
Bowling average	–	–
5 wickets in innings	–	–
10 wickets in match	–	–
Best bowling	–	–
Catches/stumpings	14/–	5/–
- Source: Cricinfo, 10 September 2011

Patrick Christopher McKeown (born 1 June 1976) is an English cricketer. McKeown is a right-handed batsman who bowls right-arm off break. He was born in Liverpool, Lancashire.

McKeown made his first-class debut for Lancashire against Somerset in the 1996 County Championship. He made 18 further first-class appearances for Lancashire, the last of which came against Derbyshire in the 2000 County Championship. In his 19 first-class matches, he scored 679 runs at an average of 26.11, with a high score of 75. This score, which was one of three first-class fifties he made, came against Cambridge University in 1999.

He also made his List A debut in 1996 against Surrey in the 1996 AXA Equity and Law League. McKeown would go on to make 19 further appearances in that format for the county, the last of which came against Northamptonshire in the 2000 Norwich Union National League. In his 20 List A matches for the county, he scored 316 runs at an average of 15.80, with a high score of 69. This score, which was his only List A half century, came against Northamptonshire in 1996. He left Lancashire at the end of the 2000 season.

He joined Cheshire for the 2001 season, making two MCCA Knockout Trophy appearances against Staffordshire and the Nottinghamshire Cricket Board, as well as a single List A match against the Lancashire Cricket Board in the 1st round of the 2002 Cheltenham & Gloucester Trophy, which was held in 2001. In this match, he scored 30 runs before being run out.
