= Patrick Kelly (cricketer) =

English cricketer

Personal information
- Full name: Patrick Arthur Charles Kelly
- Born: 1 January 1929; Ilford, Essex, England
- Died: 21 June 2002 (aged 73); Macclesfield, Cheshire, England
- Batting: Right-handed
- Bowling: Leg break

Domestic team information
- Years: Team
- 1958–1977: Cheshire

Career statistics
Competition	List A
Matches	4
Runs scored	35
Batting average	8.75
100s/50s	0/0
Top score	16
Catches/stumpings	1/–
- Source: Cricinfo, 10 April 2011

Patrick Arthur Charles Kelly (1 January 1929 – 21 June 2002) was an English cricketer. Kelly was a right-handed batsman who bowled leg break. He was born in Ilford, Essex.

Kelly made his debut for Cheshire in the 1958 Minor Counties Championship against the Yorkshire Second XI. Hall played Minor counties cricket for Cheshire from 1958 to 1977, which included 124 Minor Counties Championship matches. In 1964, he made his List A debut against Surrey in the Gillette Cup. He played three further List A matches for Cheshire, the last coming against Northamptonshire in the 1968 Gillette Cup. In his four List A matches, he scored 35 runs at a batting average of 8.75, with a high score of 16. He also played Second XI cricket for the Middlesex Second XI from 1950 to 1951.

Outside of cricket he played hockey for Essex and Cheshire. He died in Macclesfield, Cheshire on 21 June 2002.
