= Shillinglaw =

Shillinglaw is a surname. Notable people with the surname include:

- Anthony Shillinglaw (born 1937), English cricketer
- Bob Shillinglaw (born 1953), American lacrosse coach
- Brian Shillinglaw (1939–2007), Scottish rugby union and rugby league footballer
- David Shillinglaw (born 1982), British artist
- Harold Shillinglaw (1927–2016), Australian rules footballer
- John Shillinglaw (1831–1905), Australian public servant, author and historian
- Kim Shillinglaw (born 1969), British media executive
