= Dunkerley =

Dunkerley or Dunckerley is a surname. Notable people with the surname include:

- David Dunkerley (born 1952), English rugby league footballer
- James Dunkerley (born 1953), British academic
- Jason Dunkerley (born 1977), Canadian Paralympic athlete
- Roderic Dunkerley (1884–1966), English minister and writer
- Thomas Dunckerley (1724–1795), English freemason and 'natural' son of King George II
- William Arthur Dunkerley (1852–1941), English journalist, novelist and poet
- William Dunkerley (priest) (1860–1922), Anglican priest who served as Archdeacon of Singapore

== See also ==
- Dunkley (disambiguation)
- 6865 Dunkerley (1991 TE2), a Main-belt Asteroid discovered in 1991
- Dunkerley's Method, used in mechanical engineering to determine the critical speed of a shaft-rotor system
