= George Duckworth =

English cricketer

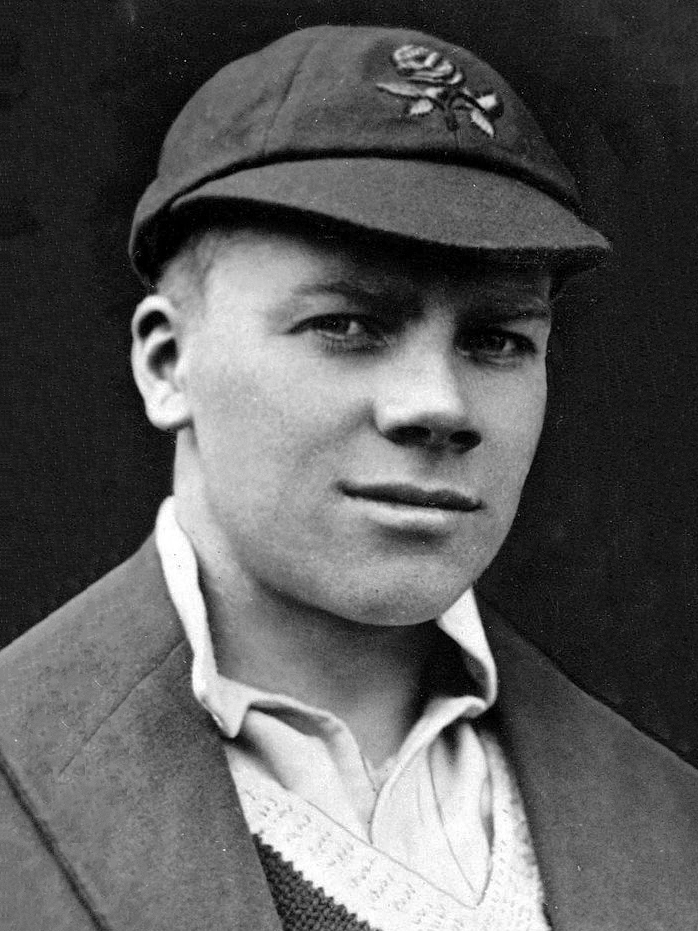

Personal information
- Full name: George Duckworth
- Born: 9 May 1901; Warrington, Lancashire, England
- Died: 5 January 1966 (aged 64); Warrington, Lancashire, England
- Batting: Right-handed
- Bowling: Occasional right arm medium
- Role: Wicket-keeper
- Relatives: Hugh de Prez (grandson); Ronald Taylor (cousin)

International information
- National side: England
- Test debut (cap 219): 26 July 1924 v South Africa
- Last Test: 18 August 1936 v India

Domestic team information
- Years: Team
- 1923–1938: Lancashire

Career statistics
Competition	Tests	First-class
Matches	24	504
Runs scored	234	4,947
Batting average	14.62	14.59
100s/50s	0/0	0/6
Top score	39 not out	75
Balls bowled	0	68
Wickets	–	0
Bowling average	–	–
5 wickets in innings	–	–
10 wickets in match	–	–
Best bowling	–	–
Catches/stumpings	45/15	755/343
- Source: CricketArchive, 28 February 2009

George Duckworth (9 May 1901 – 5 January 1966) was a professional cricketer who played first-class cricket for Lancashire and England. Duckworth played over 500 times for Lancashire and 24 times in Test cricket for England. Over eight decades after retiring, Duckworth still holds the record for dismissals for Lancashire.

== Early life ==
Duckworth was born in Warrington, Lancashire as the eldest of 10 children. His father, Arthur, had been a wicketkeeper and young George followed in his footsteps, playing behind the stumps for Boteler Grammar School and later taking his father's spot in the Warrington Cricket Club first team. Duckworth was the nephew of the rugby league footballer for Warrington, Jack Duckworth.

== Playing career ==
Duckworth joined the groundstaff at Warwickshire County Cricket Club in 1922, before returning to his home county Lancashire in 1923. He played his first game for the county in 1923. 1928 was his best season, with him taking 77 catches and 30 stumpings, and this earned him the accolade of being one of the Wisden Cricketers of the Year in 1929. He played 24 Test matches for England, but as a wicket-keeper he was in direct competition in his later years with Les Ames, who was a much better batsman. At county level, Duckworth also faced stiff competition from Bill Farrimond, who was considered good enough to represent England four times between 1931 and 1935.

He was awarded a benefit in 1934, which raised £1,257.

Duckworth announced his Lancashire retirement in 1937 but returned for one county match in June 1938 in Farrimond's absence. He played his final first-class match in a 1947 North v South game.

He was reputed to have the loudest shout of appeal of any cricketer of his time.

== Post-playing career ==
After retirement, Duckworth was a journalist and a broadcaster on both cricket and rugby league. He went on to become a member of the Lancashire committee. He also acted as a cricket tour organiser and as baggage master and scorer on Marylebone Cricket Club (MCC) tours. Frank Worrell, recognising the high esteem that Len Hutton had held Duckworth's role in 1953/54 took him to Australia as West Indies' baggageman/scorer/guru on their ground-breaking tour.

== Death and legacy ==
On New Year's Day 1966, Duckworth collapsed near his home in Warrington and died less than a week later at the Warrington General Hospital. At his funeral at the Warrington Parish Church on 7 January 1966, his coffin was carried by players of both the Lancashire County Cricket Club and the Warrington Rugby League Club. He was later cremated at the Walton Crematorium.

Duckworth's total of 925 dismissals as a wicket-keeper for Lancashire is a record for the county.

A dog bone shaped roundabout in his home town Warrington has been named after him. Duckworth's Roundabout is at Birchwood Way (A574) and Oakwood Gate.
