= Greasley (surname) =

Greasley is a surname. Notable people with the surname include:

- Andrew Greasley (born 1960), English cricketer
- Douglas Greasley (1926–2011), English cricketer
- Horace Greasley (1918–2010), British Army soldier and World War II prisoner of war
