= Mark Makin =

English cricketer

Mark Makin (born 19 December 1980) is an English cricketer, who played in List A cricket. He was a right-handed batsman and wicket-keeper who played for Cheshire. He was born in Stockport, Greater Manchester.

Makin, who played club cricket with Hyde to the 2013 season, made his Minor Counties Championship debut for Cheshire in 2002 and appeared four times in that season and the next. He made his only List A appearance in the 2003 C&G Trophy in a match against Lincolnshire that took place at the end of the previous season, in September 2002.

Makin, batting in the lower order, scored 4 runs.
