= Richard Shenton (cricketer) =

English cricketer (born 1972)

Richard Shenton (born 22 May 1972) was an English cricketer. He was a right-handed batsman and right-arm medium-fast bowler who played for Cheshire. He was born in Macclesfield.

Shenton, who made two appearances for the team during the 2001 Minor Counties Championship, made two appearances in the C&G Trophy in August and September 2001. Though he did not bat on his debut, he scored 29 runs in his second match.
