= Anthony Shillinglaw =

English cricketer

Personal information
- Full name: Anthony Laird Shillinglaw
- Born: 25 May 1937 (age 89); Birkenhead, Cheshire, England
- Batting: Right-handed
- Bowling: Right-arm medium

Domestic team information
- Years: Team
- 1959–1971: Cheshire

Career statistics
Competition	List A
Matches	4
Runs scored	65
Batting average	32.50
100s/50s	–/–
Top score	23*
Balls bowled	270
Wickets	6
Bowling average	21.33
5 wickets in innings	–
10 wickets in match	–
Best bowling	2/21
Catches/stumpings	4/–
- Source: Cricinfo, 12 August 2011

Anthony Laird Shillinglaw (born 25 May 1937) is a former English cricketer. Shillinglaw was a right-handed batsman who bowled right-arm medium pace. He was born in Birkenhead, Cheshire.

Shillinglaw made his debut for Cheshire against the Lancashire Second XI in the 1959 Minor Counties Championship. He played Minor counties cricket for Durham from 1959 to 1971, making 25 Minor Counties Championship appearances. He made his List A debut against Surrey in the 1964 Gillette Cup. He made 3 further List A appearances, the last of which came against Northamptonshire in the 1968 Gillette Cup. In his 4 List A matches, he scored 65 runs at an average of 32.50, with a high score of 23 not out. With the ball, he took 6 wickets at a bowling average of 21.33, with best figures of 2/21.
