= Anthony Smith (cricketer) =

English cricketer (1930–2018)

Personal information
- Full name: Anthony Mervyn Smith
- Born: 26 February 1930; Castle Combe, Wiltshire, England
- Died: 7 December 2018 (aged 88)
- Batting: Left-handed
- Bowling: Slow left-arm orthodox

Domestic team information
- Years: Team
- 1965: Minor Counties
- 1955–1969: Wiltshire

Career statistics
Competition	FC	LA
Matches	1	3
Runs scored	20	46
Batting average	10.00	15.33
100s/50s	–/–	–/–
Top score	12	34
Balls bowled	–	156
Wickets	–	1
Bowling average	–	83.00
5 wickets in innings	–	–
10 wickets in match	–	–
Best bowling	–	1/46
Catches/stumpings	–/–	1/–
- Source: Cricinfo, 10 October 2010

Anthony Mervyn Smith (26 February 1930 – 7 December 2018) was an English cricketer. Smith was a left-handed batsman who bowled slow left-arm orthodox. He was born at Castle Combe, Wiltshire.

Smith made his Minor Counties Championship debut for Wiltshire in 1955 against the Kent Second XI. From 1955 to 1969, he represented the county in 74 Minor Counties Championship matches, the last of which came against Oxfordshire.

Smith also represented Wiltshire in List-A cricket. His debut List-A match came against Hampshire in the 1964 Gillette Cup. From 1964 to 1969, he represented the county in 3 List-A matches, the last of which came against Essex in the 1969 Gillette Cup. In his 3 List-A matches, he scored 46 runs at a batting average of 15.33, with a high score of 34. In the field he took a single catch. With the ball he took a single wicket at a bowling average of 83.00, with best figures of 1/46.

Smith also played a single first-class match for the combined Minor Counties team in 1965 against the touring South Africans. During the match he scored 20 runs, with a high score of 12, therefore leaving him with a batting average of 10.00.

Smith died on 7 December 2018, at the age of 88.
