= Stuart Young (cricketer) =

English cricketer (born 1938)

Personal information
- Full name: Stuart Harrison Young
- Born: 6 July 1938 (age 88); Blackhall, County Durham, England
- Batting: Left-handed
- Bowling: Right-arm fast

Domestic team information
- Years: Team
- 1959–1969: Minor Counties
- 1956–1972: Durham

Career statistics
Competition	First-class	List A
Matches	3	5
Runs scored	16	38
Batting average	8.00	12.66
100s/50s	–/–	–/–
Top score	14	22
Balls bowled	583	346
Wickets	12	12
Bowling average	24.08	9.66
5 wickets in innings	–	–
10 wickets in match	–	–
Best bowling	4/44	4/13
Catches/stumpings	1/–	3/–
- Source: Cricinfo, 6 August 2011

Stuart Harrison Young (born 6 July 1938) is a former English cricketer. Young was a left-handed batsman who bowled right-arm fast. He was born at Blackhall, County Durham.

Young made his debut for Durham against the Lancashire Second XI in the 1956 Minor Counties Championship. He played minor counties cricket for Durham from 1956 to 1972, making 108 Minor Counties Championship appearances. He made his List A debut against Hertfordshire in the 1964 Gillette Cup. He made four further List A appearances, the last of which came against Oxfordshire in the 1972 Gillette Cup. In his five List A matches, he scored 38 runs at an average of 12.66, with a high score of 22. With the ball, he took 12 wickets at a bowling average of 9.66, with best figures of 4/13.

He also played first-class cricket for the Minor Counties. His first-class debut came against the touring Indians in 1959. He made two further first-class appearances for the team, against the touring South Africans in 1960, and the touring West Indians in 1969. In his three first-class matches, he scored 16 runs at an average of 8.00, with a high score of 14. With the ball, he took 12 wickets at an average of 24.08, with best figures of 4/44.
