= Daniel Leech =

English cricketer

Daniel Leech (born 13 April 1981) is an English cricketer. He is a left-handed batsman and right-arm off-break bowler who plays for Cheshire. He was born in Crewe, Cheshire.

Leech, who has represented Cheshire in the Minor Counties Championship since 2001, and still plays for the team as of 2008, made his only List A appearance in the 2004 C&G Trophy, against Hampshire. Leech scored 8 runs and took one catch.

Leech's brother, David, three years his junior, played for Cheshire in the Minor Counties Championship in 2002.
