= Hardenhuish Park Cricket Ground =

Cricket ground in Chippenham, England

Hardenhuish Park
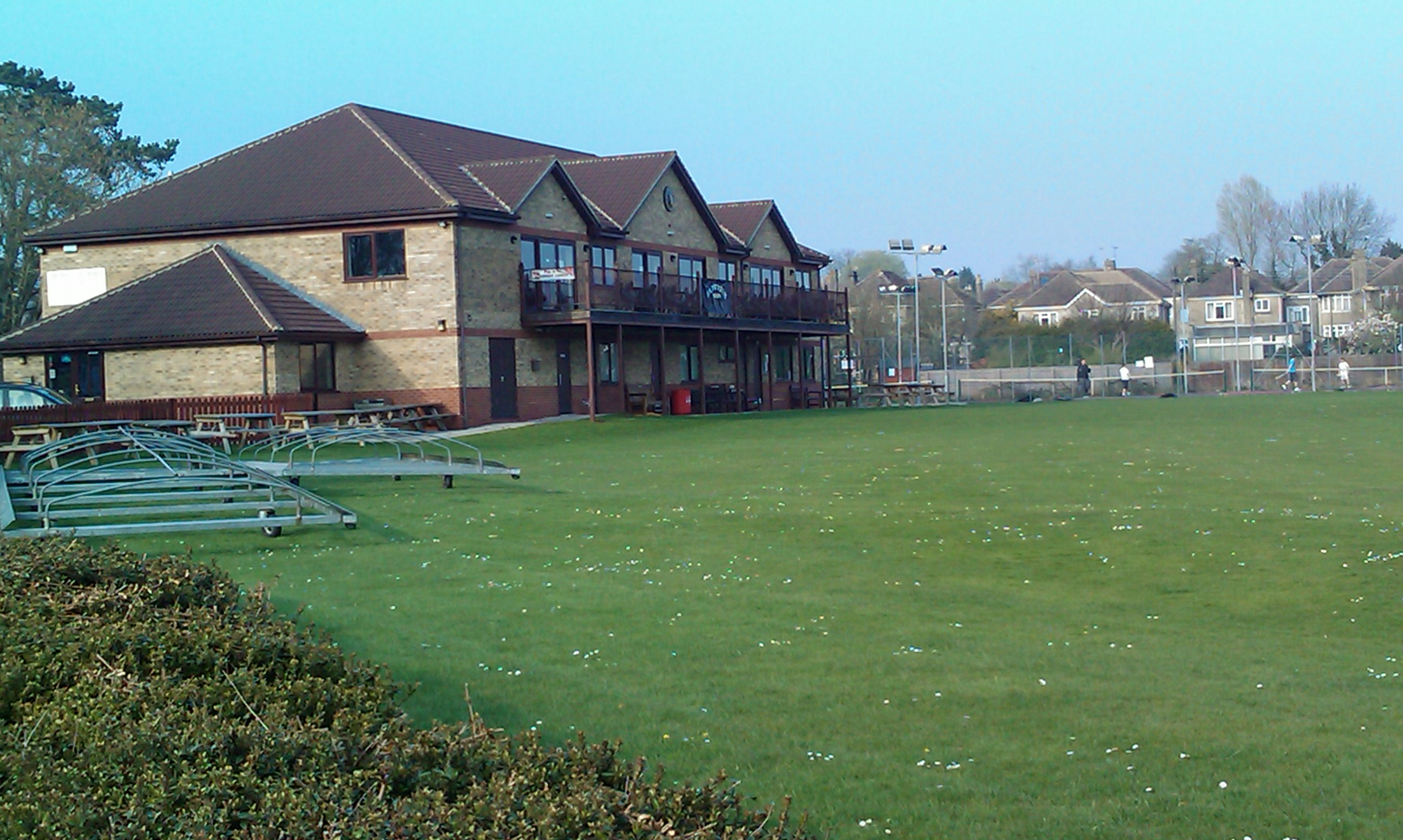
- Interactive map of Hardenhuish Park

Ground information
- Location: Chippenham, Wiltshire
- Country: England
- Coordinates: 51°27′52.71″N 2°07′38.85″W
- Establishment: 1902 (first recorded match)

Team information
Wiltshire	(1902–2003)
- As of 13 October 2011; Source: Ground profile

Hardenhuish Park is a cricket ground in Chippenham, Wiltshire, England, in the north-west suburbs of the town alongside the football ground used by Chippenham Town F.C..

Hardenhuish Park hosted a cricket match in June 1900 between teams representing the Trowbridge and Chippenham Police divisions, when the home team recorded a resounding victory. In 1902, Wiltshire played Dorset in the Minor Counties Championship. The ground was used on-and-off by Wiltshire during the 20th century, hosting 47 Minor Counties Championship matches. Two MCCA Knockout Trophy matches were also held there in 2002 and 2003.

Wiltshire have also played a number of List A matches at the ground, starting with playing against Hampshire in the 1964 Gillette Cup, which was Wiltshire's first List A match. Five further List A matches were held on the ground, four of which had a combined Minor Counties team as the home side, and the last of which saw Wiltshire play the Derbyshire Cricket Board in the 2001 Cheltenham & Gloucester Trophy.
