= Robert Simpson (cricketer) =

English cricketer

Robert Simpson (born 8 July 1962) was an English cricketer. He was a right-handed batsman who played for Cheshire. He was born in Altrincham.

Simpson, who played in the Minor Counties Championship and Minor Counties Trophy in 1983, made a single List A appearance for the side in the same season, in the NatWest Trophy, against Kent. From the middle order, he scored a single run.
