= Robin Fisher (cricketer) =

English cricketer

Personal information
- Full name: Robin William Fisher
- Born: 24 November 1970 (age 55); Chester, Cheshire, England
- Batting: Right-handed
- Bowling: Slow left-arm orthodox

Domestic team information
- Years: Team
- 1999–2006: Cheshire

Career statistics
Competition	List A
Matches	3
Runs scored	23
Batting average	23.00
100s/50s	–/–
Top score	22
Balls bowled	180
Wickets	2
Bowling average	49.00
5 wickets in innings	–
10 wickets in match	–
Best bowling	1/28
Catches/stumpings	1/–
- Source: Cricinfo, 4 April 2011

Robin William Fisher (born 24 November 1970) is a former English cricketer. Fisher was a right-handed batsman who bowled slow left-arm orthodox. He was born in Chester, Cheshire.

Fisher made his debut for Cheshire in the 1999 Minor Counties Championship against Wales Minor Counties. Fisher played Minor counties cricket for Cheshire from 1999 to 2006, including 30 Minor Counties Championship matches and 10 MCCA Knockout Trophy matches. In 2001, he made his List A debut against the Lancashire Cricket Board in the 1st round of the 2002 Cheltenham & Gloucester Trophy which was held in 2001. He played two further List A matches for Cheshire, against Bedfordshire in 1st round of the 2004 Cheltenham & Gloucester Trophy, which was held in 2003, and the following season against Hampshire in 2nd round of the same competition. In his three List A matches, he scored 23 runs at a batting average of 23.00, with a high score of 22. With the ball he took 2 wickets at a bowling average of 49.00, with best figures of 1/28.
