= Mike Taylor (cricketer, born 1944) =

English cricketer

Mike Taylor (born George Mike Taylor on 15 August 1944) was an English cricketer. He was a left-handed batsman and a left-arm medium-pace bowler who played for Cheshire. He was born in Stockport, Cheshire.

Taylor, who represented Cheshire in the Minor Counties Championship between 1980 and 1982, made a single List A appearance for the team, during the 1981 NatWest Trophy, against Hampshire. From the upper-middle order, he scored 10 runs.

Taylor's son, Andrew Bond, played for Suffolk in the Minor Counties Championship between 1996 and 1997.
