= Ian Davidson (cricketer) =

English cricketer

Personal information
- Full name: Ian Charles Davidson
- Born: 21 December 1964 (age 61); Roe Green, Worsley, Lancashire, England
- Batting: Right-handed
- Bowling: Right-arm off break

Domestic team information
- Years: Team
- 1985–1986/87: Lancashire

Career statistics
| Competition | First-class |
|---|---|
| Matches | 2 |
| Runs scored | 14 |
| Batting average | 3.50 |
| 100s/50s | –/– |
| Top score | 13 |
| Balls bowled | 162 |
| Wickets | 4 |
| Bowling average | 21.25 |
| 5 wickets in innings | – |
| 10 wickets in match | – |
| Best bowling | 2/24 |
| Catches/stumpings | 2/– |
- Source: Cricinfo, 10 June 2012

Ian Charles Davidson (born 21 October 1964) is a former English cricketer. Davidson was a right-handed batsman who bowled right-arm off break. He was born at Roe Green, Worsley, Lancashire.

Davidson made two first-class appearances for Lancashire. The first came against Warwickshire at Edgbaston in the 1985 County Championship. Winning the toss and electing to bat first, Lancashire made 148 all out, with Davidson scoring 13 runs before he was dismissed by Paul Smith. In response, Warwickshire made 122 all out in their first-innings. Lancashire then made 321 all out in their second-innings, during which Davidson was dismissed for a duck by Anton Ferreira. Set 348 to win, Warwickshire reached their target with one wicket to spare, despite Davidson taking the wickets of Andy Lloyd and Alvin Kallicharran, claiming figures of 2/24. His second appearance came against Jamaica at Sabina Park during Lancashire's 1987 tour there. Winning the toss and electing to bat first, Lancashire were dismissed for just 97, with Davidson scoring a single run before he was dismissed by Nehemiah Perry. In response, Jamaica made 264/9 declared in their first-innings, with Davidson taking the wickets of Robert Haynes and Ken McLeod, finishing the innings with figures of 2/61. Lancashire then made 201 all out in their second-innings, during which Davidson was dismissed once again by Perry for 0. Set 35 to win, Jamaica reached their target with nine wickets to spare.
