= James Pickup =

English cricketer (born 1952)

Personal information
- Full name: James Kenneth Pickup
- Born: 25 September 1952 (age 74); Stalybridge, Cheshire, England
- Batting: Right-handed
- Role: Wicket-keeper

Domestic team information
- Years: Team
- 1973–1975: Oxford University
- 1972–1985: Cheshire

Career statistics
Competition	First-class	List A
Matches	3	4
Runs scored	19	11
Batting average	3.16	11.00
100s/50s	–/–	–/–
Top score	14	6*
Balls bowled	–	–
Wickets	–	–
Bowling average	–	–
5 wickets in innings	–	–
10 wickets in match	–	–
Best bowling	–	–
Catches/stumpings	1/–	1/2
- Source: Cricinfo, 13 April 2011

James Kenneth Pickup (born 25 September 1952) is an English former cricketer. Pickup was a right-handed batsman who fielded as a wicket-keeper. He was born in Stalybridge, Cheshire.

Pickup made his debut for Cheshire in the 1972 Minor Counties Championship final against the Lancashire Second XI, playing for Cheshire just the once that season. However, the following season he made his first-class debut for Oxford University against Worcestershire. He played two further first-class matches for the university, a further one in 1973 against Sussex and a final one against Somerset in 1975. His brief appearance in first-class cricket was not successful; he scored just 19 runs at a batting average of 3.16, with a high score of 14. Pickup returned to his native county of Cheshire for the 1976 season, where he continued to represent the county in Minor counties cricket till 1985. In total he played 57 Minor Counties Championship matches and 10 MCCA Knockout Trophy matches. He did though play List A cricket upon his return, first representing Cheshire in that format in the 1981 NatWest Trophy against Hampshire. He represented the county in three further List A matches, the last coming against Yorkshire in the 1985 NatWest Trophy. In his four List A matches, he scored 11 runs. Behind the stumps he took a single catch and made a single stumping.
