= Andrew Batterley =

English cricketer

Andrew Batterley (born 27 November 1976) was an English cricketer. He was a right-handed batsman and right-arm off-break bowler who played for Cheshire. He was born in Leigh, Greater Manchester.

Batterley made two appearances for the team in the 2002 Minor Counties Championship, and a single List A appearance in the C&G Trophy in August 2002.

Between 2003 and 2006, Batterley played for Leigh in the National Club Championship and later the Cockspur Cup.
