= Steven Bramhall =

English cricketer

Personal information
- Full name: Steven Bramhall
- Born: 26 November 1967 (age 58); Warrington, Lancashire, England
- Batting: Right-handed
- Role: Wicket-keeper

Domestic team information
- Years: Team
- 1994–2001: Cheshire
- 1992–1993: Nottinghamshire
- 1990: Lancashire
- 1988–1991: Cheshire

Career statistics
Competition	First-class	List A
Matches	12	14
Runs scored	115	55
Batting average	14.37	7.85
100s/50s	–/–	–/–
Top score	37*	23
Balls bowled	–	–
Wickets	–	–
Bowling average	–	–
5 wickets in innings	–	–
10 wickets in match	–	–
Best bowling	–	–
Catches/stumpings	19/6	12/5
- Source: Cricinfo, 13 April 2011

Steven Bramhall (born 26 November 1967) is a former English cricketer. Bramhall was a right-handed batsman who fielded as a wicket-keeper. He was born in Warrington, Lancashire.

Bramhall made his debut in county cricket for Cheshire in the 1988 Minor Counties Championship final against Cambridgeshire, having played Second XI cricket for the Worcestershire Second XI prior to that. He played Minor counties cricket for Cheshire from 1989 to 1991, playing in both the Minor Counties Championship and MCCA Knockout Trophy. In the 1990 County Championship, Bramhall made his first-class debut for Lancashire against Northamptonshire. He played one further first-class match that season for Lancashire, against the touring Sri Lankans. He next appeared in first-class cricket in 1992, when he joined Nottinghamshire. It was in this season that he made his debut in List A cricket against Durham in the Sunday League. Bramhall played for Nottinghamshire in the 1992 and 1993 seasons, playing ten first-class and six List A matches. His departure from the first-class scene at the end of the 1993 season left him having played a total of 12 matches in which he scored 115 runs at a batting average of 14.37, with a high score of 37*. Behind the stumps he took 19 catches and made 6 stumpings.

Bramhall returned to his native county of Cheshire for the 1994 season, where he continued to represent the county in Minor counties cricket till 2001. In total he played 84 Minor Counties Championship matches and 24 MCCA Knockout Trophy matches. He did though play List A cricket upon his return, first representing Cheshire in that format in the 1994 NatWest Trophy against Essex. He represented the county in seven further List A matches, the last coming against Cornwall in the 2001 Cheltenham & Gloucester Trophy. In total, he played 14 List A matches in his career, scoring 55 runs at an average of 7.85, with a high score of 23. Behind the stumps he took 12 catches and made 5 stumpings.

Bramhall again led Timperley CC out on to the field for 2014 in Division 1.
