= Philip Cottrell =

English cricketer (born 1972)

Philip Cottrell (born 3 January 1972) is an English cricketer. He was a right-handed batsman and right-arm medium-fast bowler who played for Cheshire. He was born in Birkenhead.

Cottrell, who played two games for the team in the Minor Counties Championship in 1999 and 2000, made a single List A appearance for the team, in the 1999 NatWest Trophy. From the lower order, he scored 11 not out, and took figures of 1-84 from nine overs of bowling.
