= Roy Collins =

English cricketer

Personal information
- Full name: Roy Collins
- Born: 10 March 1934; Clayton, Manchester, Lancashire, England
- Died: 5 November 2009 (aged 75)
- Batting: Right-handed
- Bowling: Right-arm off break
- Relatives: Jim Cumbes (brother-in-law)

Domestic team information
- Years: Team
- 1963–1973: Cheshire
- 1960: Minor Counties
- 1954–1962: Lancashire

Career statistics
Competition	First-class	List A
Matches	120	2
Runs scored	3,436	59
Batting average	20.82	29.50
100s/50s	2/9	–/1
Top score	107*	58
Balls bowled	11,863	–
Wickets	159	–
Bowling average	30.38	–
5 wickets in innings	4	–
10 wickets in match	–	–
Best bowling	6/63	–
Catches/stumpings	80/–	1/–
- Source: Cricinfo, 29 November 2011

Roy Collins (10 March 1934 – 5 November 2009) was an English cricketer. Collins was a right-handed batsman who bowled right-arm off break. He was born at Clayton, Manchester, Lancashire.

== Lancashire ==
Collins joined the Lancashire Cricket Federation in its foundation year. He made his first-class debut for Lancashire in the County Championship against Hampshire at the United Services Recreation Ground in Portsmouth in August 1954.

Even before making his first class debut, Collins had acted as the de facto twelfth man for England against Pakistan in the Old Trafford Test that started on 22 July 1954. Jim Parks had been chosen as the twelfth man. But when Frank Lowson got injured, Parks played and Collins acted as the emergency fielder. At this point, Collins had played for the Lancashire senior team only in a two day match against North Wales.

From 1954 to 1962, Collins made 119 first-class appearances for Lancashire, with his final appearance coming in the 1962 County Championship against Sussex. He also played for the Lancashire Second XI during this period, who themselves played at that time in the Minor Counties Championship, thereby allowing Collins to represent a combined Minor Counties team against the touring South Africans in 1960, a match in which he scored 96 runs in the Minor Counties first-innings.

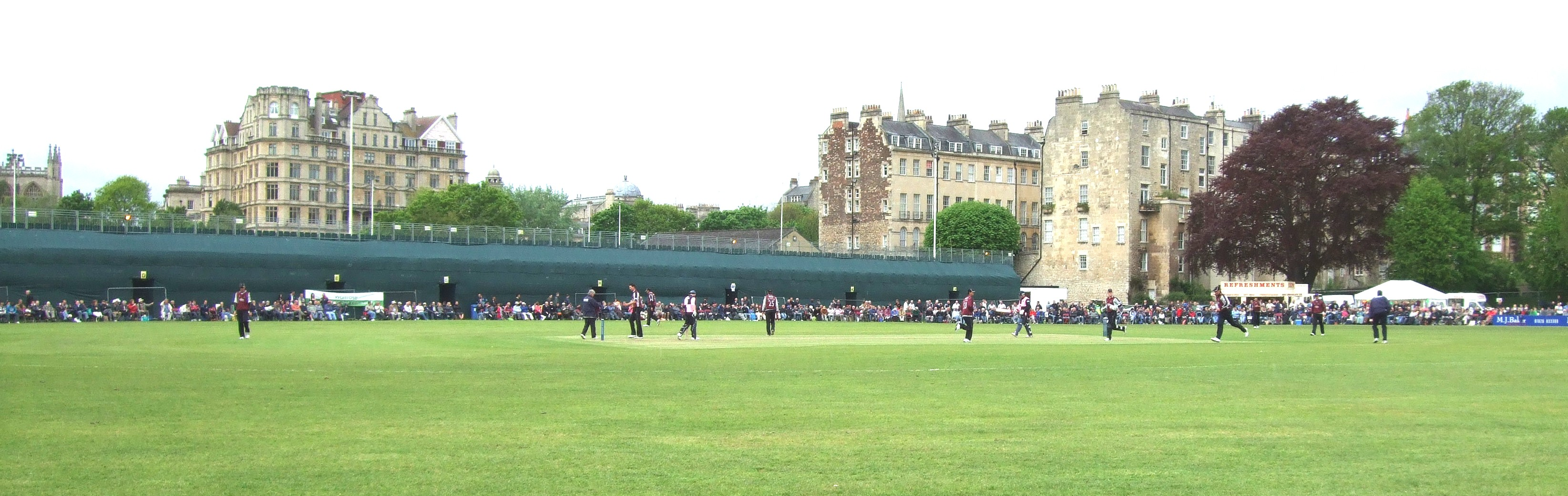
After scoring a century against Somerset at the Recreation Ground in 1961, Collins was awarded his county cap

A hard hitting all-rounder with a reputation for quick scoring, Collins scored a total of 3,332 runs in his 119 first-class appearances for Lancashire, which came at an average of 20.44 and a high score of 107 not out. This score was one of two first-class centuries he made, alongside eight half centuries for the county. An able off spiner, Collins took 159 wickets at a bowling average of 30.70, with best figures of 6.63. These figures, one of four five wicket hauls he took, came in his best season with Lancashire in 1961. His figures of 6/63 came against Sussex on a drying first-innings wicket at Old Trafford. In the following match he scored his unbeaten 107 against Somerset at the Recreation Ground, Bath, after he was awarded his county cap. He made another century in that season, scoring a total of 858 runs at an average of 26.00, while with the ball he took 52 wickets at an average of 29.73, with that season including three of his four career five wicket hauls. He also took twice as many wickets in that season as he had in any other. The 1962 season was to be his last with Lancashire, with Collins striking 25 sixes in that season.

== Cheshire ==
He joined Cheshire in 1963, making his debut for the county against Staffordshire in the Minor Counties Championship. He played Minor counties cricket intermittently for Cheshire until 1973, making a total of 49 appearances. He had left Lancashire a season before List A cricket was introduced, a format which would have suited his hard hitting batting style. He made his List A debut for Cheshire against Surrey in the 1st round of the 1964 Gillette Cup at the Ellerman Lines Cricket Ground in Hoylake. Collins top scored in Cheshire's innings with 58, before being dismissed by Michael Willett. Surrey won the match by 62 runs. He made a second List A appearance in the 1966 Gillette Cup against his former county at the Macclesfield Cricket Club Ground, scoring a single run before he was dismissed by Peter Lever, with Lancashire winning by 42 runs.

== Personal life ==
Outside of county cricket, Collins played in the Lancashire League for Haslingden in 1959 and Lowerhouse from 1959 to 1968. He also played club cricket for Leek Cricket Club in Staffordshire and for Blackburn Cricket Club and Rochdale, both in Lancashire. In his forties he played for Didsbury as an amateur, later being invited to become first the chairman, then President of the club. His affection for cricket continued long after his retirement from the game, with Collins working alongside the Manchester Education Committee in setting up an indoor cricket school in Withington, which was one of the first of its kind and was used by both Lancashire and England players. He worked as a residential cricket coach for the Manchester Education Committee for 32 years.

In his early years he worked for a textile company, before setting up an insurance brokers company with his wife Doris, who was the sister of Lancashire, Surrey, Worcestershire and Warwickshire cricketer and professional footballer Jim Cumbes. He continued to coach cricket well into his final years, advising schools and clubs in the Manchester area. He died suddenly on 5 November 2009.
