= William Dunkerley (priest) =

Rev. William Herbert Cecil Dunkerley (15 May 1860 – 21 August 1922) was an Anglican priest who was the Archdeacon of Singapore from 1902 to 1905.

Dunkerley was born in Shrewsbury, the son of Rev. Dr. William Dunkerley. He studied at Denstone College and Pembroke College, Cambridge, and was ordained in 1886. After curacies in Toxteth Park and Sigglesthorne, he was a Chaplain at Malacca and Penang before his time in Singapore. On returning to Europe, he worked at Castlemorton, Worcestershire; Bush Hill Park, Middlesex; Cannes, France; and Sevenoaks and Leybourne in Kent.

In 1886, he married Mary Beatrice Taylor, with whom he had six children. He died on 21 August 1922 at the Leybourne Rectory in Kent.
