= Andrew Greasley =

English cricketer (born 1960)

Personal information
- Full name: Andrew David Greasley
- Born: 23 March 1960 (age 66); Leicester, Leicestershire, England
- Batting: Right-handed
- Bowling: Right-arm off break

Domestic team information
- Years: Team
- 1990–1997: Cheshire

Career statistics
Competition	List A
Matches	2
Runs scored	2
Batting average	1.00
100s/50s	–/–
Top score	2
Balls bowled	114
Wickets	1
Bowling average	50.00
5 wickets in innings	–
10 wickets in match	–
Best bowling	1/31
Catches/stumpings	–/–
- Source: Cricinfo, 21 September 2023

Andrew David Greasley (born 23 March 1960) was an English cricketer. He was a right-handed batsman and right-arm off-break bowler who played for Cheshire. He was born in Leicester.

Greasley played for Leicestershire Second XI in the Second XI Championship between 1979 and 1983, he also represented British Colleges during that same period before playing for Cheshire in the Minor Counties Championship between 1990 and 1997.

Greasley made a two List A appearances for the team, between 1995 and 1996, in the NatWest Trophy. From the tailend, he scored 2 runs in the first match in which he played, and a duck in the second. However the highlight of Greasley's Cheshire career was playing in the victorious MCC Trophy winning team of 1996 which defeated Bedfordshire in the Lords final in August 1996 - Greasley taking two wickets in that game.

Greasley played top-level club cricket in Leicestershire for the Leicester Ivanhoe club before settling in Yorkshire and playing for York CC in the Yorkshire League during the 1980s. During his time at York Greasley was an important member of the 1988 Yorkshire League winning team, he also served as club secretary for a while. In 1989 Greasley moved to Greater Manchester and thereafter played in the Cheshire League, mainly for Marple Cricket Club, who he still represented regularly in the Cheshire County Premier Division in 2018 at the age of 58.
