= Martin Knight (cricketer) =

English cricketer (born 1984)

Martyn Knight (born 5 October 1984) was an English cricketer. He was a right-handed batsman and left-arm medium-pace bowler who played for Cheshire. He was born in Ashton-under-Lyne, Greater Manchester.

Knight made a single appearance for Lancashire Second XI during the 2002 season, as a substitute for Michael Smethurst.

Knight appeared in the Minor Counties Championship between 2002 and 2004, and made a single List A appearance for Cheshire, in the C&G Trophy in August 2002.
