= Stewart Storey =

English cricketer (born 1941)

Personal information
- Full name: Stewart James Storey
- Born: 6 January 1941 (age 85); Worthing, Sussex, England
- Batting: Right-handed
- Bowling: Right-arm medium
- Role: All-rounder

Domestic team information
- Years: Team
- 1960–1976: Surrey
- 1978: Sussex
- FC debut: 25 June 1960 Surrey v Hampshire
- Last FC: 29 August 1978 Sussex v Middlesex

Career statistics
| Competition | First-class | List A |
|---|---|---|
| Matches | 332 | 141 |
| Runs scored | 10,776 | 1,672 |
| Batting average | 25.06 | 14.29 |
| 100s/50s | 12/54 | 0/1 |
| Top score | 164 | 56 |
| Balls bowled | 35,565 | 5,609 |
| Wickets | 496 | 123 |
| Bowling average | 26.56 | 28.13 |
| 5 wickets in innings | 11 | 1 |
| 10 wickets in match | 2 | 0 |
| Best bowling | 8/22 | 5/35 |
| Catches/stumpings | 326/– | 47/– |
- Source: CricketArchive, 2 June 2008

Stewart James Storey (born 6 January 1941) is a former English cricketer. He was an all-rounder, a right-handed middle-order batsman and right-arm medium pace bowler as well as being a fine slip fielder. He played for Surrey from 1960 to 1976, winning the County Championship with them in 1971, and subsequently appeared for Sussex in 1978. He was readily recognisable on the cricket field by his fair hair.

He finished his first-class cricket career with over 10,000 runs, almost 500 wickets and more than 300 catches. He did the double for Surrey in 1966, the only occasion since World War II that a Surrey player has achieved the feat. He reached 1,000 runs in five seasons in all, but 1966 was the only time that he managed 100 wickets.

His last appearance in top-class cricket was when he appeared for Sussex in the Final of the Gillette Cup at Lord's on 2 September 1978. Sussex beat Somerset by five wickets, but Storey's contribution to their victory was minor; he did not bowl and scored 0 not out. This paralleled his experience when Surrey won the Benson and Hedges Cup during his last full season with them in 1974. In the Final at Lord's Surrey beat Leicestershire by 27 runs, but Storey scored only 2 and did not bowl.

== Surrey career ==
=== Early days ===
Storey played in three matches in 1960, his debut season, but scored a total of only 11 runs and did not bowl. The next three seasons, 1961 to 1963, saw only a modest improvement. In 10, 14 and 16 matches respectively, he scored 269 runs at an average of 14.94, 366 runs at 18.30 and 402 runs at 16.75. However, he did manage one century in each of 1962 and 1963. His bowling was also not very effective, with 12 wickets at 41.00, 17 at 38.35 and 20 at 21.75. However, he held 23 catches in 1962 from only 14 matches.

1964 was his breakthrough season. In 30 games he scored 1050 runs at 22.82 with one century, though he passed fifty on only three other occasions. Given more bowling, he captured 42 wickets at 30.64, and for the first time managed to take five wickets in an innings. He also held 37 catches, a figure that he would never surpass.

=== All-rounder ===
The following year (1965) Storey did not manage a century in his 33 matches, but his average for his 1052 runs improved to 25.65 and he reached fifty on seven occasions. His bowling was more penetrative, with 53 wickets at 22.28. He had what would remain his best figures in an innings of 8/22 against Glamorgan at Swansea, including a hat-trick, and took 11 wickets in the match. He held 35 catches over the 1965 season.

The Gillette Cup, the first List A limited overs competition, had begun in 1963. Though Storey did not contribute much with the bat, his bowling proved very economical. In 1964 he took 9 wickets at 17.00 in 4 matches, at only 2.94 runs per over. He had an analysis of 5/35 against Middlesex in helping Surrey to an easy win in their quarter-final tie. For this he received the "Man of the Match" award.

In 1965 he did even better. In four Gillette Cup matches he took 7 wickets at 14.42, at 2.74 runs per over. He had figures of 5.5 overs, 2 maidens, 14 runs, 4 wickets, when taking the last four wickets against Northamptonshire. Surrey reached the Final, in which they suffered a heavy defeat by Yorkshire. However, Storey came out with considerable credit, with figures of 0/33 from his 13 overs in a Yorkshire total of 317–4 in 60 overs.

1966 was the year in which he did the double in first-class matches, albeit only just. In 29 matches he scored 1013 runs at 24.70, with one century and eight fifties; he took 104 wickets at 18.39, taking 5 wickets in an innings five times and 10 wickets in a match once (5/17 and 5/22 against Glamorgan). Perhaps because of his exertions with bat and ball, his number of catches fell to 16. In three Gillette Cup matches he did not take a wicket and conceded 3.79 runs per over.

In 1967 he just missed his thousand runs for the season, with 940 at 26.11 from 31 matches, including two centuries. He took 78 wickets at 20.92, taking 5 wickets in an innings on only one occasion. He took 33 catches. He delivered only 28 balls in Surrey's two Gillette Cup matches.

=== Batsman and change bowler ===
From 1968 onwards his bowling declined, though it remained useful in limited overs matches, and he never thereafter reached 50 wickets in a season in first-class matches. However, after two lean seasons in 1968 and 1969, his batting improved.

1968 brought him only 412 runs in 19 first-class matches, at an average of 17.16 and with a top score of only 53. He dismissed 33 batsmen at 27.60, and held 17 catches. Surrey suffered a heavy defeat by Middlesex in their only Gillette Cup match, but Storey bowled his 12 overs for only 25 runs and then top-scored with 40, his highest innings to date in the competition.

1969 saw a similar return with the bat: 22 matches, 462 runs at 20.08, though he did manage one century. His bowling continued to decline: 21 wickets at 34.33. One bright feature was that he held 32 catches. The season saw the introduction of the John Player League, so that he played in as many as 15 List A matches. However, they did not bring him much in the way of success.

1970 saw a return to form with the bat, and for the first time he averaged over thirty. 23 matches brought him 1045 runs at 31.88, with one century and eight other scores of fifty or more. He took only 19 wickets at 43.47, and for the first time since 1963 he failed to take five wickets in an innings. He held 18 catches. In 19 one-day matches he took 18 wickets at 23.66, conceding only 3.52 runs per over. His best figures came in a Gillette Cup tie against Glamorgan (seemingly his favourite opponents) and won him the man of the match award: 12 overs, 5 maidens, 13 runs, 3 wickets.

Surrey won the County Championship in 1971 for the first time since 1958, and Storey made a major contribution with the bat and also regained some form with the ball. In 26 matches he made 1184 runs at 35.87, his highest average to date, with one hundred, and seven fifties.

The hundred was an innings of 164, the highest score of his career. It came in the third-to-last match of the season, against Derbyshire, when Surrey badly needed a win to strengthen their challenge for the title. He came to the wicket with the score at 54 for 4, which soon became 70 for 5. He dominated the remainder of the innings, and when he was finally dismissed, at 315 for 9, Surrey were able to declare. Derbyshire achieved near parity on first innings before declaring. Surrey needed quick runs in their second innings, and Storey top-scored again, with 41 out of 187 for 8 declared. Derbyshire collapsed in their second innings and Surrey got the win that they needed.

He took 42 wickets that season at 23.80 and held 19 catches. He again bowled usefully in one-day cricket (though his batting was negligible), with 21 wickets in 17 matches at 21.61, conceding 3.69 runs per over.

With the reduction in the number of first-class matches to accommodate the increasing one-day programme, he never reached 1,000 runs in a season after 1971. 1972 was less successful for him with the bat. 21 matches brought him 682 runs at 27.28, and he failed to make a century. Also his bowling was ineffective. He took only 16 wickets at 51.81. However, he did hold 30 catches. His bowling figures were worse in one-day matches as well: 18 wickets in 20 matches at 31.05, conceding 4.09 runs per over.

In 1973 he was back to form with the bat. In 22 matches he made 813 runs at 33.87, with one hundred. He took 17 wickets at 38.82 and held 19 catches. In 17 List A one-day matches he took 17 wickets at 30.05, at 3.52 runs per over. He also managed 279 runs at 18.60. That year was his benefit season. It realised £9,500.

In terms of his average, 1974 was his best as a batsman. 17 matches brought him 744 runs at 39.15, with two centuries. He captured 16 wickets at 25.06 and held 14 catches. In scoring 342 runs in 20 one-day matches at an average of 19.00, he managed his only fifty, an innings of 56. With the ball he took 12 wickets at 29.08, at 3.45 runs per over.

Since he was batting as well as ever, it was a surprise that he retired at the end of the 1974 season. However, the Surrey dressing room was not a happy place at the time, and that may have been a factor in his decision. He reappeared in one John Player League fixture in 1976, against Kent on 11 July.

== Sussex career ==
Storey reappeared in 1978, playing for a new county, Sussex, but he had little success. In 16 first-class matches he managed only 331 runs at 16.55, with a highest score of only 57. He took a mere 6 wickets at 39.16. In 17 List A matches he batted 14 times, but scored only 120 runs with a highest score of 31. He took just 8 wickets, but had a respectable runs conceded per over figure of 4.34.

He remained with Sussex as their coach until 1987, but made no appearances for the first eleven after 1978.
