= Ron Lay =

Personal information
- Full name: Ronald Samuel Marshall Lay
- Born: 18 February 1917; England
- Died: 9 November 1996 (aged 79); Northampton, Northamptonshire, England

Umpiring information
- FC umpired: 304 (1953–1968)
- LA umpired: 12 (1963–1968)
- Source: , 14 March 2021

Ronald Samuel Marshall Lay (18 February 1917 – 9 November 1996) was an English cricket umpire.

== Umpire career ==
Lay began as an umpire in club matches across Northamptonshire, before officiating in matches in the Minor Counties Championship from 1950. He first officiated in first-class cricket in 1953, standing in the match between Northamptonshire and Scotland at Peterborough. He was appointed to the first-class list of umpires in 1956 and proceeded to stand in 303 first-class matches between 1956 and 1968, predominantly in the County Championship. He additionally stood in 12 List A one-day matches between 1963 and 1968. He missed part of the 1964 season after being struck on the foot and injured by a ball which had been straight driven by Ted Dexter. Lay died at Northampton in November 1996.
