= Geoff Smith (Essex cricketer) =

English cricketer

Personal information
- Full name: Geoffrey John Smith
- Born: 2 April 1935 (age 91); Braintree, Essex, England
- Batting: Right-handed
- Bowling: Right-arm off break

Domestic team information
- Years: Team
- 1967–1969: Hertfordshire
- 1963: Marylebone Cricket Club
- 1955–1966: Essex

Career statistics
Competition	First-class	List A
Matches	243	6
Runs scored	8,797	135
Batting average	22.61	22.50
100s/50s	5/45	–/2
Top score	148	63
Balls bowled	2,236	114
Wickets	33	1
Bowling average	28.81	53.00
5 wickets in innings	1	–
10 wickets in match	–	–
Best bowling	5/39	1/12
Catches/stumpings	133/–	1/–
- Source: Cricinfo, 7 December 2011

Geoffrey John Smith (born 2 April 1935) is a former English county cricketer. Smith was a right-handed batsman who bowled right-arm off break. He was born at Braintree, Essex.
