= Jim Pressdee =

Welsh cricketer

Cricket information
- Batting: Right-handed
- Bowling: Slow left-arm orthodox

Domestic team information
- Years: Team
- Glamorgan

Career statistics
Competition	First-class
Matches	347
Runs scored	14,267
Batting average	28.82
100s/50s	13
Top score	150*
Balls bowled	26,137
Wickets	481
Bowling average	22.17
5 wickets in innings	21
10 wickets in match	5
Best bowling	9/43
Catches/stumpings	371
- Source: CricInfo

James Stuart Pressdee (19 June 1933 – 20 July 2016) was a Welsh first class cricketer. He was a left-arm spinner and aggressive right-handed batsman. He also played association football in the Football League and Welsh Football League where he played as a left-back.

== Football career ==
He won a Welsh youth cap at football and was on the books at Swansea Town where provided reliable defensive cover. He turned professional at the Vetch Field in August 1951. He was given his League debut in Swansea's 2–0 defeat at home to Everton in March 1954, making eight Second Division appearances before concentrating on his cricket career. He also had spells with Brecon Corinthians and Llanelly in the Welsh Football League.

== Cricket career ==
Pressdee made his debut for Glamorgan against Nottinghamshire at Cardiff Arms Park when just 16 years of age, making him the county's youngest player in the post-war period.

A regular in the Glamorgan team from 1955 onwards, Pressdee scored a thousand runs in a season on six occasions, with 1911 in 1962 being his best. He scored 13 centuries including one for North-Eastern Transvaal. Playing 322 games for Glamorgan CCC between 1949 and 1965.

Pressdee was an inconsistent bowler. Having taken 71 wickets in 1955, he captured only 54 during the next seven seasons, but then in 1963 and 1964 he came to prominence as an all-rounder, completing the double (1000 runs and 100 wickets) in each season. In 1965, he took 9 for 43 against Yorkshire at Swansea. Pressdee emigrated to South Africa in 1965 where he played for North-Eastern Transvaal until 1969–70. He won the South African Cricket Annual Cricketer of the Year award in 1966 after taking 33 wickets.

Pressdee returned to Wales in the 1980s and captained the Glamorgan Colts side in the South Wales Cricket Association.
