= Philip Dunkley =

English cricketer

Philip Dunkley (born 3 March 1951) was an English cricketer. He was a right-handed batsman who played for Cheshire. He was born in Sandbach, Cheshire.

Dunkley, whose career began with Liverpool in the Liverpool and District Cricket Competition in 1971, and who played in the Second XI Championship for Lancashire, made a single List A appearance for Cheshire, during the 1981 NatWest Trophy. From the lower-middle order, he scored 16 before having to retire hurt from the game.
