= Graham Cooper (cricketer) =

English cricketer

Graham Charles Cooper (2 September 1936 – 18 April 2012) was an English cricketer active from 1955 to 1969 who played for Sussex. He was born in East Grinstead and died in Hastings. He appeared in 252 first-class matches as a righthanded batsman who bowled off breaks. He scored 8,134 runs with a highest score of 142 and took 100 wickets with a best performance of five for 13.
