= Ken McLeod (cricketer) =

Jamaican cricketer (born 1964)

Kenneth Walcott McLeod (born 18 March 1964), formerly called Kenneth Walcott, is a former Jamaican cricketer active from 1983 to 1988 who played for Jamaica and Lancashire. He was born in St Elizabeth, Jamaica. He appeared in 13 first-class matches as a righthanded batsman who bowled left arm fast medium. He scored 128 runs with a highest score of 31 and held 4 catches. He took 28 wickets with a best analysis of five for 8.
