= Geoff Hall (cricketer) =

English cricketer (1941–2009)

Personal information
- Full name: Geoffrey Harold Hall
- Born: 1 June 1941; Colne, Lancashire, England
- Died: 2 November 2009 (aged 68); Braunton, Devon, England
- Batting: Right-handed
- Bowling: Right-arm fast
- Role: Bowler

Domestic team information
- Years: Team
- 1961–1965: Somerset
- FC debut: 21 June 1961 Somerset v Cambridge University
- Last FC: 16 August 1965 Somerset v Worcestershire
- LA debut: 27 May 1964 Somerset v Nottinghamshire
- Last LA: 23 June 1965 Somerset v Yorkshire

Career statistics
Competition	First-class	List A
Matches	48	3
Runs scored	90	2
Batting average	3.90	2.00
100s/50s	0/0	0/0
Top score	12*	1*
Balls bowled	7,363	216
Wickets	111	8
Bowling average	30.85	13.62
5 wickets in innings	2	1
10 wickets in match	0	0
Best bowling	6/60	5/34
Catches/stumpings	9/–	3/–
- Source: CricketArchive, 24 January 2010

Geoffrey Harold Hall (1 June 1941 – 2 November 2009) was an English cricketer. He was born in Colne, Lancashire. During his career, he played for Somerset County Cricket Club, and made a total of 48 first-class appearances for the county.

== Cricket career ==
Hall was a right-arm fast or fast-medium bowler and a right-handed tail-end batsman. Some measure of the relative merits of his batting and bowling is that he took more first-class wickets than he scored first-class runs. Unusually for a fast bowler, he wore spectacles.

He played Lancashire League cricket for Colne Cricket Club from the age of 15. In 1959 and 1960 he appeared in second eleven matches for Lancashire in both the Second Eleven Championship and the Minor Counties Championship.

Unable to break into the Lancashire first team, Hall joined Somerset in 1961 and made his debut in the match against Cambridge University in June; the 6 not out he made in a last-wicket stand with Mike Latham to win the match would prove to be his fourth highest innings in a career where he batted 51 times. He also played in three County Championship matches that 1961 season without success.

In the 1962 season, Hall played in more than half of Somerset's matches, usually opening the bowling. He took 46 wickets at an average of 34.04 in the season. His best bowling performance of the season was to take the first four Hampshire wickets in the second innings of the match at Southampton. The match immediately before that one, he had produced the best batting performance of his career: a not out 12 against Yorkshire in a high-scoring draw at Taunton.

For the 1963 season, Somerset recruited the Worcestershire fast bowler Fred Rumsey as a new-ball partner for Ken Palmer; Rumsey was an instant success, and became a Test player from 1964, so Hall's opportunities in the first team in both 1963 and 1964 were much reduced. Injury to Palmer in 1965 and Rumsey's Test calls led to more matches for Hall in 1965, and with 41 wickets at an average of 24.48 he had his best season in first-class cricket. Against Cambridge University in June, he took five wickets for 33 runs, the best performance of his career to that point. And he then bettered that with six for 60 in Nottinghamshire's first innings in the match at Worksop, a game in which he also had to hold out at the end as a batsman to save the match, which he did by courtesy of being dropped at backward short leg in the last-but-one over of the game.

Hall played only three limited overs matches, but was prominent in two of them. His first match, against Nottinghamshire in the Gillette Cup in 1964, was the first to be decided on the basis of the winning side having lost fewer wickets. Wisden reported Somerset's victory: "They needed four to win with the last pair together when (Bryan) Wells began the final over; (Brian) Langford took a single, Hall was nearly run out then scored a run, and Langford managed to scramble another off the last ball to equal the scores." In the next round, against Sussex, Hall took five wickets for 34 runs in his 13 overs and won the Man of the Match Award, the first such award to be won by a Somerset player in the competition; Somerset nonetheless lost the match.

Hall left Somerset after the 1965 season. He played Minor Counties cricket for Cumberland in 1966.

== After cricket ==
After retiring from first-class cricket and having a career designing heating systems for local government, he moved to Braunton, North Devon with his second wife Mary. He died at Braunton on 2 November 2009 after suffering from prostate cancer.
