= Dunckley Pass =

Mountain pass in Colorado, USA

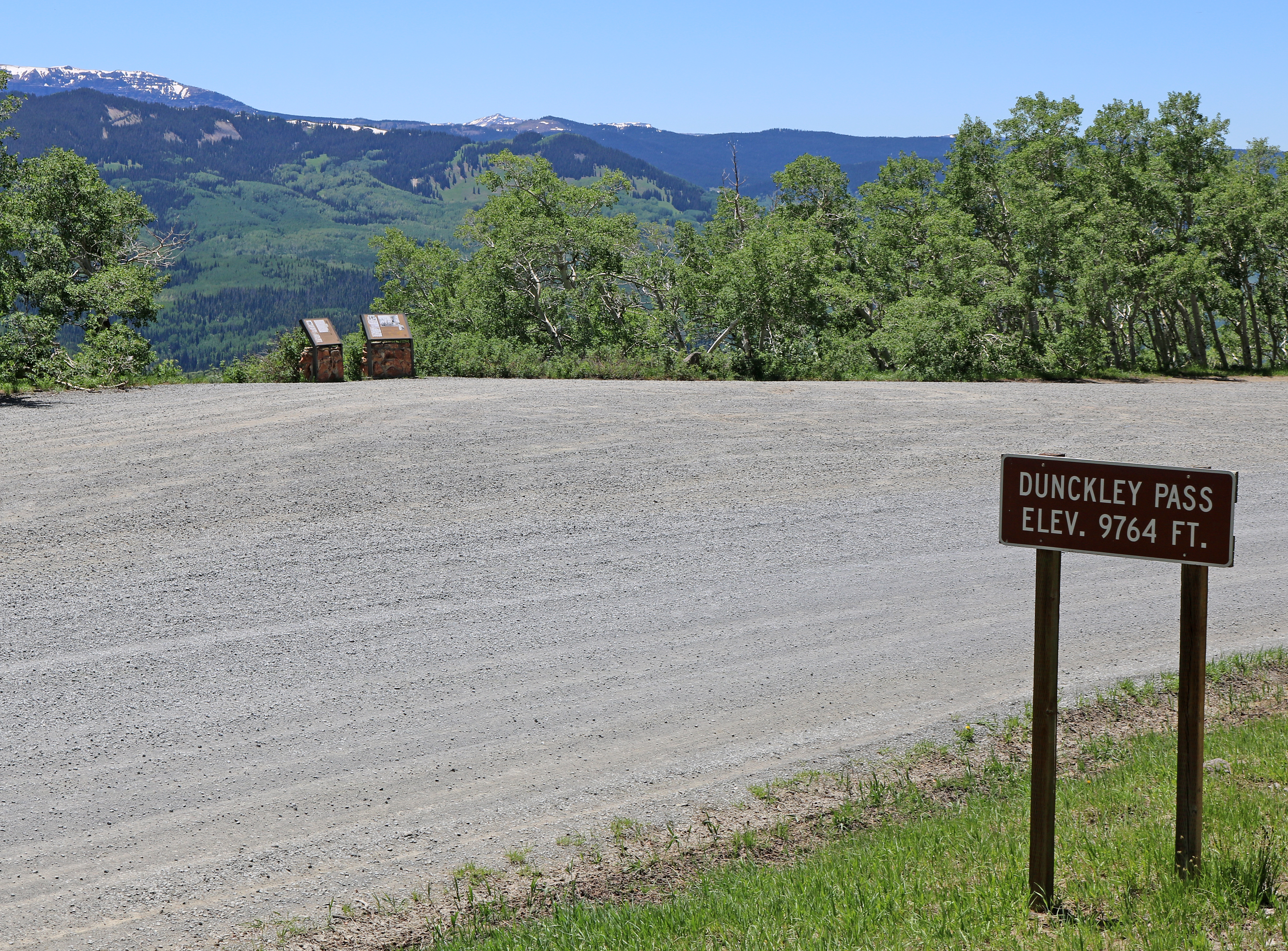
- Looking across the pass to The Flat Tops

- Location within Colorado
- Elevation: 2,977 metres (9,767 ft)
- Traversed by: Rio Blanco County Road 8 (unpaved road)

Third Approach
- Location: Rio Blanco County, Colorado
- Range: The Flat Tops
- Coordinates: 40°12′6″N 107°9′31″W
- Topo map: USGS Dunckley Pass

Dunckley Pass is a high mountain pass in The Flat Tops mountains of western Colorado. Rio Blanco County Road 8, a gravel road, traverses the pass, which divides the watersheds of East Fork Williams Fork and Fish Creek.

The pass, part of the Flat Tops Trail Scenic and Historic Byway, is accessible to passenger cars, but only seasonally, generally from late May to October. The Dunckley Pass Overlook Picnic Site, near the actual pass, provides views of The Flat Tops.
