= Hugh de Prez =

English cricketer

Hugh de Prez (9 November 1951 – 9 July 2008), born Peter Hugh de Prez, was an English cricketer. He was a right-handed batsman and right-arm off-break bowler who played for Cheshire. He was born and died in Warrington.

De Prez, who made his debut in the Minor Counties Championship in 1970, but whose most active seasons in the league were 1978 and 1986, made a single List A appearance, in the 1987 NatWest Trophy. He scored 11 runs and took bowling figures of 0-33 from 9 overs.
