= Malcolm Dunkley =

English footballer

Personal information
- Date of birth: 12 July 1961
- Place of birth: Wolverhampton, England
- Date of death: 24 September 2005 (aged 44)
- Place of death: England
- Position: Forward

Senior career*
Years	Team	Apps	(Gls)
–1987	Bromsgrove Rovers	–	(–)
1987–1988	Stafford Rangers	21	(9)
1988	RoPS	24	(9)
1988–1989	Lincoln City	9	(4)
1989–1990	RoPS	51	(11)
1991–1992	Tornion Tarmo	–	(44)
1993–1994	FC Kontu	45	(8)
- * Club domestic league appearances and goals

Malcolm Dunkley (12 July 1961 – 24 September 2005) was an English professional footballer.

Dunkley started his career with Bromsgrove Rovers, before joining Stafford Rangers. In 1988, he signed a contract with Finnish top division club RoPS Rovaniemi. After one season in Division Four with Lincoln City Dunkley returned to Finland and played two seasons in the Veikkausliiga for Rovaniemi. Dunkley ended his career with Finnish second-tier club FC Kontu.

After his professional career Dunkley spent several years in Finland as a coach. He died of a heart attack at the age of 44.
