= Norman Halsall =

English cricketer

Personal information
- Full name: Norman Richard Halsall
- Born: 9 October 1935 (age 91); West Derby, Lancashire, England
- Batting: Right-handed
- Bowling: Right-arm medium-fast

Domestic team information
- Years: Team
- 1979–1980: Cheshire
- 1975–1976: Cumberland
- 1962–1974: Cheshire

Career statistics
Competition	List A
Matches	4
Runs scored	27
Batting average	6.75
100s/50s	–/–
Top score	16
Balls bowled	90
Wickets	2
Bowling average	21.50
5 wickets in innings	–
10 wickets in match	–
Best bowling	2/37
Catches/stumpings	1/–
- Source: Cricinfo, 11 April 2011

Norman Richard Halsall (born 9 October 1935) is a former English cricketer. Halsall was a right-handed batsman who bowled right-arm medium-fast. He was born in West Derby, Lancashire.

Halsall made his debut for Cheshire in the 1962 Minor Counties Championship against Staffordshire. Halsall played Minor counties cricket for Cheshire from 1962 to 1974, which included 98 Minor Counties Championship matches In 1964, he made his List A debut against Surrey in the Gillette Cup. He played three further List A matches for Cheshire, the last coming against Northamptonshire in the 1968 Gillette Cup. In his four List A matches, he scored 27 runs at a batting average of 6.75, with a high score of 16. With the ball he took 2 wickets at a bowling average of 21.50, with best figures of 2/37.

Halsall left Cheshire after the 1974 season, joining Cumberland the following season. He played Minor Counties Championship cricket for Cumberland from 1975 to 1976, which included five Minor Counties Championship fixtures. He later rejoined Cheshire, playing a single fixture each in 1979 and 1980, with his final fixture against the Lancashire Second XI, which marked his hundredth Minor Counties Championship match for the county.
