= Ronald Wood (cricketer) =

English cricketer

Ronald Wood (3 June 1929 – 22 May 1990) was an English first-class cricketer, who played twenty two matches for Yorkshire County Cricket Club between 1952 and 1956. He also played for the Yorkshire Second XI (1950–57), and in non first-class cricket for Worcestershire in 1958.

Born in Ossett, Yorkshire, England, Wood was a slow left orthodox spin bowler, who took fifty one wickets at an average of 26.39, with a best of 8 for 45 against Scotland. He took five wickets in an innings three times, including 5 for 34 against Worcestershire. He scored 60 runs as a right-handed batsman, with a best score of 17, at an average of 4.28. He also took five catches in the field.

Wood died in May 1990 in Stanley, Wakefield, Yorkshire, aged 60.

His brother, Barry Wood, played 12 Test matches and was a Lancashire stalwart in the 1970s, while his nephew, Nathan Wood, played thirty matches for Lancashire.
