= Frederick Dunkley =

English cricketer

Frederick John Dunkley (9 September 1862 – 11 December 1901) was an English first-class cricketer active 1886–1888 who played for Middlesex. He was born in Chelsea; died in Marylebone.
