= David Sydenham =

English cricketer

Personal information
- Full name: David Alfred Donald Sydenham
- Born: 6 April 1934 (age 92); Surbiton, Surrey, England
- Batting: Right-handed
- Bowling: Left-arm fast-medium

Domestic team information
- Years: Team
- 1957 to 1972: Surrey

Career statistics
Competition	First-class	List A
Matches	145	8
Runs scored	485	8
Batting average	7.13	4.00
100s/50s	0/0	0/0
Top score	22*	8
Balls bowled	25,698	528
Wickets	487	13
Bowling average	19.98	20.15
5 wickets in innings	26	0
10 wickets in match	3	0
Best bowling	9/70	4/6
Catches/stumpings	52/–	3/–
- Source: CricketArchive, 29 December 2021

David Alfred Donald Sydenham (born 6 April 1934) is a former English first-class cricketer. A left-arm fast bowler, he played with Surrey County Cricket Club from 1957 to 1965, then had one further match in 1972.

In the 1962 season Sydenham topped the national bowling averages with 115 wickets at 17.65. In May 1964 he took 9 for 70 and 3 for 31 in Surrey's victory over Gloucestershire at The Oval. In his first List A match, he took 4 for 6 off 9 overs against Cheshire in the Gillette Cup in 1964; he took Cheshire's first four wickets in five balls, including a hat-trick.

A chiropodist by profession, David Sydenham held managerial posts in the National Health Service.

He was sometimes confused with his contemporary, the Southampton footballer John Sydenham, to whom he was not related.
