= John Hitchmough (cricketer, born 1962) =

English cricketer (born 1962)

Personal information
- Full name: John Jeffrey Hitchmough
- Born: 19 January 1962 (age 64); Liverpool, Lancashire, England
- Batting: Right-handed
- Bowling: Right-arm off break

Domestic team information
- Years: Team
- 1983–1992: Cheshire

Career statistics
Competition	List A
Matches	7
Runs scored	66
Batting average	9.42
100s/50s	–/–
Top score	22
Balls bowled	–
Wickets	–
Bowling average	–
5 wickets in innings	–
10 wickets in match	–
Best bowling	–
Catches/stumpings	2/–
- Source: Cricinfo, 6 April 2011

John Jeffrey Hitchmough (born 19 January 1962) is a former English cricketer. Hitchmough was a right-handed batsman who bowled right-arm off break. He was born in Liverpool, Lancashire.

Hitchmough made his debut for Cheshire in the 1983 MCCA Knockout Trophy against Hertfordshire. Hitchmough played Minor counties cricket for Cheshire from 1983 to 1992, including 66 Minor Counties Championship matches and 20 MCCA Knockout Trophy matches. In 1985, he made his List A debut against Yorkshire in the NatWest Trophy. He played six further List A matches for Cheshire, the last of which came against Gloucestershire in the 1992 NatWest Trophy. In his seven List A matches, he scored 66 runs at a batting average of 9.42, with a high score of 22.
