= John Hitchmough (cricketer, born 1958) =

English cricketer

Personal information
- Full name: John Sutton Hitchmough
- Born: 18 April 1958 (age 68); Liverpool, Lancashire, England
- Batting: Right-handed
- Bowling: Right-arm medium

Domestic team information
- Years: Team
- 1985–1986: Minor Counties
- 1982–1989: Cheshire

Career statistics
Competition	List A
Matches	9
Runs scored	84
Batting average	10.50
100s/50s	–/–
Top score	34
Balls bowled	372
Wickets	7
Bowling average	35.00
5 wickets in innings	–
10 wickets in match	–
Best bowling	2/37
Catches/stumpings	3/–
- Source: Cricinfo, 6 April 2011

John Sutton Hitchmough (born 19 April 1958) is a former English cricketer. Hitchmough was a right-handed batsman who bowled right-arm medium pace. He was born in Liverpool, Lancashire.

Hitchmough made his debut for Cheshire in the 1982 Minor Counties Championship against Durham. Hitchmough played Minor counties cricket for Cheshire from 1982 to 1989, including 38 Minor Counties Championship matches and 15 MCCA Knockout Trophy matches. In 1982, he made his List A debut for Cheshire against Middlesex in the NatWest Trophy. He played three further List A matches for Cheshire, the last of which came against Hampshire in the 1989 NatWest Trophy, as well representing the Minor Counties cricket team in five List A matches in the 1985 and 1986 Benson and Hedges Cup. In his nine career List A matches, he scored 84 runs at a batting average of 10.50, with a high score of 34. With the ball he took 7 wickets at a bowling average of 35.00, with best figures of 2/37.
