= 2001 English cricket season =

The 2001 English cricket season was the 102nd in which the County Championship had been an official competition. Yorkshire won the County Championship for the first time since 1968. In limited overs cricket, a change of sponsor meant that the NatWest Trophy became the C&G Trophy. The Second XI Trophy was inaugurated as a limited overs knockout competition. Australia again won the Ashes, this time largely due to some fine performances by Adam Gilchrist. It was the 70th test series between the two teams with Australia winning 4–1. Pakistan also toured England with the series ending in a 1–1 draw.

== Honours ==
- County Championship - Yorkshire
- C&G Trophy - Somerset
- National League - Kent
- Benson & Hedges Cup - Surrey
- Minor Counties Championship - Cheshire, Lincolnshire (shared title)
- MCCA Knockout Trophy - Norfolk
- Second XI Championship - Hampshire II
- Second XI Trophy - Surrey II
- Wisden - Andy Flower, Adam Gilchrist, Jason Gillespie, V V S Laxman, Damien Martyn

== Test Series ==
=== Ashes tour ===
Cumulative record - Test wins	1876–2001
England	94
Australia	121
Drawn	86

== External sources ==
- CricketArchive – season and tournament itineraries

== Annual reviews ==
- Playfair Cricket Annual 2002
- Wisden Cricketers' Almanack 2002
