= Cheshire County Cricket Club =

English cricket team

Personnel
- Captain: 3-day: (England) Robert Sehmi 50 over: (England) Will Evans T20: (England) Nick Anderson
- Coach: (England) Stewart MacLeod

Team information
- Founded: 1908

History
- MCCC wins: 5
- MCCAT wins: 3
- FP Trophy wins: 1
- Official website: Cheshire County Cricket Club

Cheshire County Cricket Club is one of twenty national county clubs within the domestic cricket structure of England and Wales. It represents the historic county of Cheshire.

The team is currently a member of the Minor Counties Championship Western Division and plays in the MCCA Knockout Trophy. Cheshire played List A matches occasionally until 2004 but is not classified as a List A team per se. The club does not have a base but plays matches around the county including at Chester Boughton Hall, Didsbury, Nantwich, New Brighton, Grappenhall, Tattenhall and at Moss Lane, Alderley Edge.

== Honours ==
- Minor Counties Championship (5) - 1967, 1985, 1988, 2007, 2013; shared (2) - 2001, 2005
- MCCA Knockout Trophy (4) - 1983, 1987, 1996, 2018
- MCCA T20 Cup (1) - 2015

== Earliest cricket ==
Cricket may not have reached Cheshire until the 18th century. As advised by the Association of Cricket Statisticians (ACS), the earliest known reference to the sport being played in the county has been found in the Manchester Journal dated Saturday, 1 September 1781. It concerned an eleven-a-side match played the previous Monday, 27 August, at Brinnington Moor between a team of printers and one representing the villages of Haughton and Bredbury, who were the winners. As Haughton was then in Lancashire, the match is the earliest reference for that county too.

== Origin of club ==
According to Wisden there was a county organisation as early as 1819. The present club was founded on 29 September 1908 and entered the Minor Counties Championship for the first time the following year, 1909.

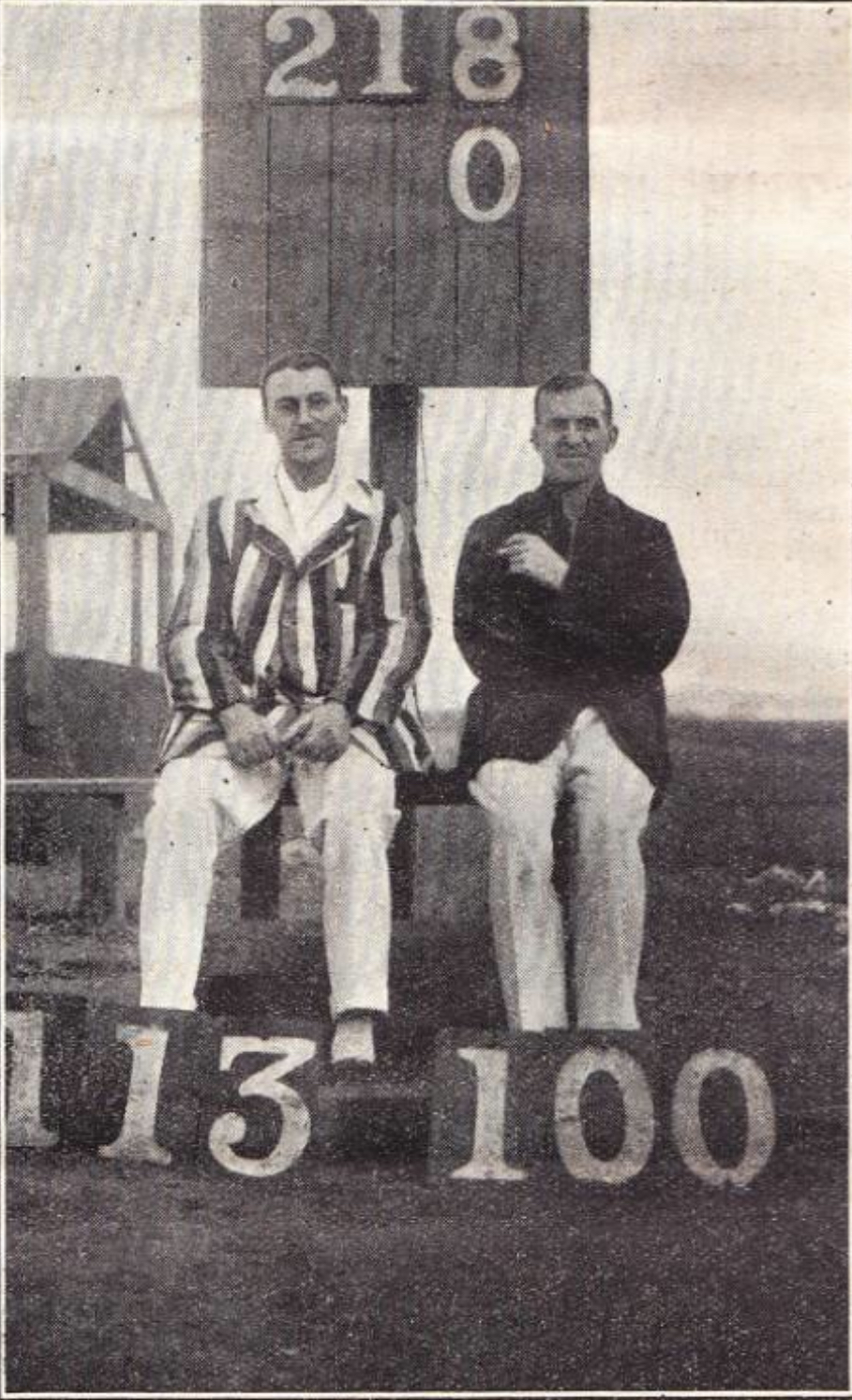
HW Hodgson and WE Jones in 1921 pose for the camera after adding an unbeaten 218 v Durham at Burnmoor

== Club history ==
Cheshire played its first List A match against Surrey on 6 May 1964, in the first round of the Gillette Cup at the Ellerman Lines Cricket Ground, Hoylake. Cheshire has won the Minor Counties Championship five times, and twice shared the title. It won the title outright in 1967, 1985, 1988, 2007 and 2013. It shared the accolade in 2001 with Lincolnshire and in 2005 with Suffolk.

Cheshire has won the MCCA Knockout Trophy three times since its inception in 1983. It won in 1983, 1987 and 1996.

Cheshire won the MCCA T20 Cup in 2015, the first season in which it was held. The tournament was dropped for 2016.

== Notable players ==
The following Cheshire cricketers also made an impact on the first-class game:

- David Bailey
- Bob Barber
- Winston Benjamin
- Bob Cooke
- Geoff Miller
- Mudassar Nazar
- Chris Schofield
- Barry Wood

The following Cheshire cricketers are famous for non-cricketing reasons.

- Stuart Cummings (MBE): ex-Rugby League referee
