= List of Cambridgeshire County Cricket Club List A players =

Cambridgeshire County Cricket Club played 28 List A cricket matches between 1964 and 2004. This is a list of the players who appeared in those matches.

- Nick Adams, 10 matches, 1987–2001
- Ajaz Akhtar, 16 matches, 1991–2004
- David Bailey, 1 match, 1965
- David Baker, 3 matches, 1972–1982
- Justin Benson, 1 match, 1986
- Ian Blanchett, 2 matches, 2001
- Mark Brown, 2 matches, 1982–1983
- Martin Burton, 1 match, 1995
- Adrian Cade, 2 matches, 1991–1992
- James Campbell-Ferguson, 2 matches, 1965–1967
- Douglas Collard, 5 matches, 1975–1989
- Darren Cousins, 1 match, 1999
- Denis Cousins, 1 match, 1972
- Edward Craig, 1 match, 1967
- Maurice Crouch, 1 match, 1964
- Andrew Cuthill, 1 match, 1987
- Edward Davis, 1 match, 1967
- Philip Dicks, 2 matches, 1988–1989
- Bradleigh Donelan, 5 matches, 1995–1999
- Cristian Durant, 7 matches, 1997–2001
- Giles Ecclestone, 6 matches, 1992–2002
- Simon Ecclestone, 1 match, 1992
- David Fairey, 6 matches, 1964–1975
- Ian Flanagan, 2 matches, 2002–2004
- Gary Freear, 4 matches, 2001–2004
- Brian Gadsby, 5 matches, 1964-1972
- Nigel Gadsby, 22 matches, 1982–2004
- Mike Garnham, 3 matches, 1986–1988
- Rex Gautrey, 4 matches, 1964–1967
- Joe Grant, 1 match, 2004
- Cameron Green, 1 match, 1989
- Frank Griffith, 1 match, 2000
- Terry Hale, 4 matches, 1964–1967
- John Harvey, 1 match, 1975
- Alan Hobbs, 1 match, 1965
- Dean Hoffman, 1 match, 1989
- David Holliday, 1 match, 1983
- Patrick Holman, 1 match, 1975
- Tony Howorth, 1 match, 1975
- Tom Huggins, 1 match, 2001
- John Jacklin, 1 match, 1975
- Terry Jenner, 1 match, 1972
- Christopher Jones, 3 matches, 2001–2004
- Simon Kellett, 11 matches, 1996–2003
- Aamer Khan, 2 matches, 2001
- Nasim Khan, 1 match, 2002
- Patrick Latham, 1 match, 1998
- Ian Lawrence, 4 matches, 1986–1989
- Stewart Layton, 1 match, 2004
- Christopher Lethbridge, 2 matches, 1986–1987
- David Lyon, 1 match, 1972
- Peter Malkin, 1 match, 1983
- John Mann, 1 match, 2004
- Mark Mason, 5 matches, 2000–2003
- Kevin Masters, 1 match, 1996
- Gerald McDougall, 2 matches, 2002–2003
- Michael McEvoy, 1 match, 1982
- Richard Merriman, 2 matches, 1991–1997
- Geoffrey Miller, 3 matches, 1982–1986
- Robert Milne, 2 matches, 1987–1991
- Saleem Mohammed, 6 matches, 1994–1999
- David Norman, 7 matches, 1989–2000
- Jared Norman, 3 matches, 1998–2000
- Martin Olley, 3 matches, 1991–1994
- Ivor Parker, 1 match, 1982
- Matthew Parkinson, 1 match, 2000
- Derick Parry, 3 matches, 1982–1986
- Adrian Pierson, 1 match, 1992
- Alan Ponder, 5 matches, 1967–1983
- Robert Powell, 1 match, 2001
- Dominic Ralfs, 6 matches, 1994–1999
- Paul Redfarn, 3 matches, 1983–1989
- Vincent Reed, 1 match, 1975
- Gary Rice, 3 matches, 1982–1988
- Bruce Roberts, 1 match, 1992
- Ed Rodgers, 1 match, 2003
- Robert Rollins, 4 matches, 2001–2003
- Mark Saggers, 2 matches, 1982–1983
- Tony Shippey, 5 matches, 1964–1972
- Samuel Shippey, 2 matches, 1964–1967
- Tim Smith, 11 matches, 1994–2004
- Keith Steele, 1 match, 1972
- Martin Stephenson, 7 matches, 1972–1992
- Peter Such, 1 match, 2002
- Pieter Swanepoel, 1 match, 2004
- Paul Swannell, 1 match, 2004
- Peter Swart, 1 match, 1975
- Alistair Tapp, 2 matches, 2000
- Kevin Thomas, 1 match, 1991
- Charles Thornely, 1 match, 1988
- Giles Toogood, 1 match, 1995
- Stuart Turner, 4 matches, 1987–1994
- Douglas Vincent, 1 match, 1986
- Chris Walsh, 1 match, 2000
- Tim Walton, 1 match, 2001
- Johnny Wardle, 4 matches, 1964–1967
- Christopher Whyborn, 1 match, 1997
- Simon Williams, 2 matches, 1995–1996
- Alan Wilson, 4 matches, 1964–1967
- Danny Wilson, 5 matches, 2000–2001
- Elliott Wilson, 1 match, 2003
- Derek Wing, 9 matches, 1964–1986
- Adrian Wykes, 3 matches, 1987–1989
- Kenneth Yates, 1 match, 1964
