= Shippey =

Shippey is a surname. Notable people with the surname include:

- Lee Shippey (1884–1969), American author and journalist
- Samuel Shippey (born 1937), British cricketer
- Tom Shippey (born 1943), British literary scholar, especially of J. R. R. Tolkien
- Tony Shippey (born 1939), English cricketer
