= Thornely =

Thornely is a surname, and may refer to:

- Arnold Thornely (1870–1953), English architect
- Charles Thornely (born 1958), English cricketer, poet and writer
- Dominic Thornely (born 1978), Australian cricketer
- Michael Thornely (born 1987), English cricketer
- Ronald Thornely (1889–1984), English World War I flying ace
