= 1967 Gillette Cup =

- Administrator: Marylebone Cricket Club
- Cricket format: Limited overs cricket (60 overs per innings)
- Tournament format: Knockout
- Champions: Kent (1st title)
- Participants: 22
- Matches: 21
- Most runs: 238 – Brian Luckhurst (Kent)
- Most wickets: 10 – Roy Palmer (Somerset)

The 1967 Gillette Cup was the fifth Gillette Cup, an English limited overs county cricket tournament. It was held between 23 April and 2 September 1967. The tournament was won by Kent County Cricket Club who defeated Somerset County Cricket Club by 32 runs in the final at Lord's.

== Format ==
The 17 first-class counties, were joined by five Minor Counties: Bedfordshire, Cambridgeshire, Durham, Lincolnshire and Oxfordshire. Teams who won in the first round progressed to the second round. The winners in the second round then progressed to the quarter-final stage. Winners from the quarter-finals then progressed to the semi-finals from which the winners then went on to the final at Lord's which was held on 2 September 1967.

== First round ==
23 April 1967
Scorecard

Nottinghamshire; 191/7 (60 overs)	v	Durham; 180 (59.1 overs)
Roy Swetman 48; John Bailey 3/37 (12 overs)		Mike Westcott 47; Barry Stead 3/17 (12 overs)

Nottinghamshire won by 11 runs
Ropery Lane, Chester-le-Street
Umpires: Albert Gaskell and Tom Spencer
Player of the match: John Bailey (Nottinghamshire)

26 April 1967
Scorecard

Northamptonshire; 237/5 (60 overs)	v	Bedfordshire; 154 (50.3 overs)
Roger Prideaux 75; Graham Jarrett 2/49 (12 overs)		Geoff Millman 44; Mushtaq Mohammad 3/31 (12 overs)

Northamptonshire won by 83 runs
Wardown Park, Luton
Umpires: Arthur Fagg and Fred Price
Player of the match: Colin Milburn (Northamptonshire)

26 April 1967
Scorecard

Somerset; 251/9 (60 overs)	v	Leicestershire; 160 (46.3 overs)
Graham Burgess 73; Peter Marner 3/61 (12 overs)		Peter Marner 60; Roy Palmer 4/42 (9.3 overs)

Somerset won by 91 runs
County Ground, Taunton
Umpires: Jack Crapp and Peter Wight
Player of the match: Mervyn Kitchen (Somerset)

29 April 1967
Scorecard

Hampshire; 244/8 (60 overs)	v	Lincolnshire; 141 (51.2 overs)
Roy Marshall 102; Norman McVicker 3/42 (12 overs)		Harry Pougher 54; Butch White 4/8 (7.2 overs)

Hampshire won by 103 runs
May's Bounty, Basingstoke
Umpires: Albert Alderman and John Arnold
Player of the match: Roy Marshall (Hampshire)

29 April 1967
Scorecard

Worcestershire; 115 (54.4 overs)	v	Sussex; 119/8 (53.3 overs)
Alan Ormrod 43; Tony Buss 4/25 (12 overs)		Tony Greig 22; Jack Flavell 3/21 (12 overs)

Sussex won by 2 wickets
New Road, Worcester
Umpires: Syd Buller and Laurie Gray
Player of the match: Tony Buss (Sussex)

3 May 1967
Scorecard

Oxfordshire; 115/8 (60 overs)	v	Cambridgeshire; 116/6 (48.1 overs)
Peter Smith 34*; Alan Wilson 4/14 (12 overs)		Peter Shippey 37; David Laitt 3/29 (12 overs)

Cambridgeshire won by 4 wickets
Wisbech Cricket Club Ground, Wisbech
Umpires: Ron Lay and Harry Mellows
Player of the match: Alan Wilson (Cambridgeshire)

== Second round ==
13 May 1967
Scorecard

Kent; 239/8 (60 overs)	v	Essex; 197 (56 overs)
Colin Cowdrey 66; Tony Jorden 3/41 (12 overs)		Rodney Cass 33*; Norman Graham 4/19 (12 overs)

Kent won by 42 runs
Old County Ground, Brentwood
Umpires: Laurie Gray and John Langridge
Player of the match: Colin Cowdrey (Kent)

13 May 1967
Scorecard

Hampshire; 236/7 (60 overs)	v	Glamorgan; 220 (58.4 overs)
Roy Marshall 61; Don Shepherd 3/32 (11 overs)		Alan Jones 67; Bob Cottam 3/47 (11.4 overs)

Hampshire won by 16 runs
United Services Recreation Ground, Portsmouth
Umpires: Eddie Phillipson and Dusty Rhodes
Player of the match: Barry Reed (Hampshire)

13, 15, 16 May 1967
Scorecard

Gloucestershire; 153 (52.4 overs)	v	Lancashire; 157/6 (56 overs)
Arthur Milton 45; Brian Statham 3/22 (10 overs)		David Green 48; David Smith 2/38 (10 overs)

Lancashire won by 4 wickets
Old Trafford, Manchester
Umpires: George Pope and Hugo Yarnold
Player of the match: David Green (Lancashire)

- Match was scheduled for one day but extended to three.

13 May 1967
Scorecard

Nottinghamshire; 203 (59.5 overs)	v	Northamptonshire; 205/6 (54 overs)
Deryck Murray 53; Antony Durose 3/46 (12 overs)		Mushtaq Mohammad 68; John Howarth 3/30 (10 overs)

Northamptonshire won by 6 wickets
County Ground, Northampton
Umpires: David Halfyard and Lofty Herman
Player of the match: Mushtaq Mohammad (Northampshire)

13 May 1967
Scorecard

Surrey; 263/4 (60 overs)	v	Derbyshire; 74 (34.1 overs)
Micky Stewart 74; Brian Jackson 1/36 (12 overs)		Derek Morgan 27; Geoff Arnold 5/9 (9 overs)

Surrey won by 184 runs
The Oval, London
Umpires: Ron Aspinall and Ron Lay
Player of the match: Geoff Arnold (Surrey)

13 May 1967
Scorecard

Sussex; 243 (60 overs)	v	Middlesex; 212 (57.3 overs)
Ken Suttle 86; John Price 5/54 (12 overs)		Eric Russell 72; Tony Buss 3/38 (10.3 overs)

Sussex won by 31 runs
County Ground, Hove
Umpires: Bill Copson and Cec Pepper
Player of the match: Ken Suttle (Sussex)

13, 15, 16 May 1967
Scorecard

Somerset; 206/8 (60 overs)	v	Warwickshire; 181 (54.3 overs)
Roy Virgin 49; David Brown 2/37 (12 overs)		Tom Cartwright 34; Bill Alley 3/24 (12 overs)

Somerset won by 25 runs
Edgbaston, Birmingham
Umpires: Bill Copson and Cec Pepper
Player of the match: Bill Alley (Somerset)

- Match was scheduled for one day but extended to three.

25 May 1967
Scorecard

Cambridgeshire; 43/8 (10 overs)	v	Yorkshire; 46/4 (6.5 overs)
David Fairey 22; Tony Nicholson 3/11 (3 overs)		Ken Taylor 21; David Fairey 2/8 (3 overs)

Yorkshire won by 6 wickets
Savile Park, Castleford
Umpires: Freddie Jakeman and Arthur Jepson
Player of the match: David Fairey (Cambridgeshire)

- Match reduced to 10 overs per side. The match was moved from Headingley due to torrential rain.

== Quarter-finals ==
14 June 1967
Scorecard

Lancashire; 194 (57.5 overs)	v	Yorkshire; 190 (59.2 overs)
Harry Pilling 39; Chris Old 4/32 (12 overs)		Phil Sharpe 33; Peter Lever 4/38 (12 overs)

Lancashire won by 4 runs
Old Trafford, Manchester
Umpires: Freddie Jakeman and Tom Spencer
Player of the match: Peter Lever (Lancashire)

14 June 1967
Scorecard

Somerset; 184 (59.3 overs)	v	Northamptonshire; 148 (54.3 overs)
Mervyn Kitchen 40; Peter Willey 3/42 (12 overs)		Roger Prideaux 38; Fred Rumsey 4/23 (9.3 overs)

Somerset won by 36 runs
County Ground, Northampton
Umpires: Albert Alderman and George Pope
Player of the match: Bill Alley (Somerset)

14 June 1967
Scorecard

Surrey; 74 (37.4 overs)	v	Kent; 75/4 (28.4 overs)
Mike Edwards 34; Alan Dixon 7/15 (12 overs)		Brian Luckhurst 40*; Geoff Arnold 2/18 (12 overs)

Kent won by 6 wickets
The Oval, London
Umpires: Lofty Herman and Fred Price
Player of the match: Alan Dixon (Kent)

14 June 1967
Scorecard

Sussex; 233/9 (60 overs)	v	Hampshire; 224 (57.5 overs)
Tony Greig 46; Alan Castell 4/52 (12 overs)		Brian Timms 55; Tony Buss 3/41 (11.5 overs)

Sussex won by 9 runs
County Ground, Hove
Umpires: Syd Buller and John Langridge
Player of the match: Tony Greig (Sussex)

== Semi-finals ==
19, 20 July 1967
Scorecard

Somerset; 210/7 (60 overs)	v	Lancashire; 110 (47.4 overs)
Mervyn Kitchen 40; Peter Lever 2/44 (12 overs)		Ken Shuttleworth 23; Ken Palmer 3/20 (12 overs)

Somerset won by 100 runs
Old Trafford, Manchester
Umpires: Jack Crapp and Charlie Elliott
Player of the match: Ken Palmer (Somerset)

- Match was scheduled for one day but extended to two.

19 July 1967
Scorecard

Kent; 293/5 (60 overs)	v	Sussex; 175 (50.3 overs)
Colin Cowdrey 78; Tony Greig 2/59 (12 overs)		Jim Parks 44; Alan Brown 3/17 (8.3 overs)

Kent won by 118 runs
St Lawrence Ground, Canterbury
Umpires: Peter Wight and Hugo Yarnold
Player of the match: Colin Cowdrey (Kent)

== Final ==
2 September 1967
Scorecard

Kent; 193 (59.4 overs)	v	Somerset; 161 (54.5 overs)
Brian Luckhurst 54; Bill Alley 3/22 (12 overs)		Peter Robinson 48; Derek Underwood 3/41 (10 overs)

Kent won by 32 runs
Lord's, London
Umpires: Syd Buller and Fred Price
Player of the match: Mike Denness (Kent)
