= John Bush (English cricketer) =

English cricketer

Personal information
- Full name: John Edgar Bush
- Born: 20 August 1928; Oxford, Oxfordshire, England
- Died: 1 June 2015 (aged 86); Northbourne, Kent, England
- Batting: Right-handed

Domestic team information
- Years: Team
- 1950–1952: Oxford University
- 1949–1973: Oxfordshire

Career statistics
Competition	First-class	List A
Matches	8	1
Runs scored	417	14
Batting average	29.78	14.00
100s/50s	–/4	–/–
Top score	67	14
Balls bowled	–	–
Wickets	–	–
Bowling average	–	–
5 wickets in innings	–	–
10 wickets in match	–	–
Best bowling	–	–
Catches/stumpings	6/–	–/–
- Source: Cricinfo, 24 May 2011

John Edgar Bush (20 August 1928 – 1 June 2015) was an English cricketer in the 1950s.

Bush was born in Oxford, Oxfordshire. He attended Magdalen College School, Oxford, before going on to Magdalen College at Oxford University. A right-handed batsman, he made his first-class debut for Oxford University against the Free Foresters in 1950. He played 7 further first-class matches for the University, the last coming against Cambridge University in 1952. In his 8 first-class matches, he scored 417 runs at a batting average of 29.78, with a high score of 67. This came against Middlesex in 1952.

Bush made his debut for Oxfordshire before playing for Oxford University, first appearing in the 1949 Minor Counties Championship against Buckinghamshire. Bush played Minor counties cricket for Oxfordshire from 1949 to 1973 which included 139 Minor Counties Championship matches. He made his only List A appearance for Oxfordshire against Cambridgeshire in the 1967 Gillette Cup. In this match he scored 14 runs before being dismissed by Alan Wilson.

He was a schoolmaster at St Lawrence College, Ramsgate, from 1956 until his retirement in 1988.
