= Brian Jeffries =

English cricketer

Personal information
- Full name: Brian Reginald Jeffries
- Born: 1 October 1946 (age 80); Oxford, Oxfordshire, England
- Batting: Right-handed
- Bowling: Right-arm medium

Domestic team information
- Years: Team
- 1970–1980: Oxfordshire
- 1974–1975: Minor Counties South
- 1978: Minor Counties West

Career statistics
Competition	List A
Matches	11
Runs scored	107
Batting average	11.88
100s/50s	0/0
Top score	46
Balls bowled	524
Wickets	10
Bowling average	34.80
5 wickets in innings	0
10 wickets in match	0
Best bowling	3/31
Catches/stumpings	2/–
- Source: Cricinfo, 27 May 2011

Brian Reginald Jeffries (born 1 October 1946) is a former English cricketer. Jeffries was a right-handed batsman who bowled right-arm medium pace. He was born in Oxford, Oxfordshire.

Jeffries made his debut for Oxfordshire in the 1970 Minor Counties Championship against Dorset. Jeffries played Minor counties cricket for Oxfordshire from 1970 to 1980, which included 46 Minor Counties Championship matches. He made his List A debut against Durham in the 1972 Gillette Cup. He played 2 further List A matches for Oxfordshire, against Cornwall and Gloucestershire in the 1975 Gillette Cup.

Playing for Oxfordshire allowed him to represent the Minor Counties cricket teams. He first played for Minor Counties South in the 1974 Benson & Hedges Cup against Glamorgan. Jeffries played 5 further List A matches for Minor Counties South, the last coming against Middlesex in the 1975 Benson & Hedges Cup. In addition, he played 2 List A matches for Minor Counties West in the 1978 Benson & Hedges Cup against Derbyshire and Lancashire. In total, Jeffries played 11 List A matches. In these he scored 107 runs at a batting average of 11.88, with a high score of 46. With the ball, he took 10 wickets at a bowling average of 34.80, with best figures of 3/31.
