= 1972 Gillette Cup =

Tenth edition of Gillette Cup, a cricket tournament

- Administrator: Test and County Cricket Board
- Cricket format: Limited overs cricket (60 overs per innings)
- Tournament format: Knockout
- Champions: Lancashire (3rd title)
- Participants: 22
- Matches: 21
- Most runs: 272 Clive Lloyd (Lancashire)
- Most wickets: 14 Bob Willis (Warwickshire)
- Official website: CricketArchive tournament page

The 1972 Gillette Cup was the tenth Gillette Cup, an English limited overs county cricket tournament. It was held between 5 July and 2 September 1972. The tournament was won by Lancashire County Cricket Club who defeated Warwickshire County Cricket Club by 4 wickets in the final at Lord's.

== Format ==
The seventeen first-class counties were joined by five Minor Counties: Buckinghamshire, Cambridgeshire, Durham, Oxfordshire and Wiltshire. Teams who won in the first round progressed to the second round. The winners in the second round then progressed to the quarter-final stage. Winners from the quarter-finals then progressed to the semi-finals from which the winners then went on to the final at Lord's which was held on 2 September 1972.

=== First round ===
5 July 1972
(scorecard)

Buckinghamshire; 224/7 (60 overs)	v	Cambridgeshire; 41 all out (20 overs)
David Janes 95; Derek Wing 4/40 (12 overs)		David Baker 7 Raymond Bond 5/17 (10 overs)

Buckinghamshire won by 183 runs
Fenner's, Cambridge
Umpires: Bill Alley & Ron Aspinall
Player of the match: Raymond Bond (Buckinghamshire)

5 July 1972
(scorecard)

Wiltshire; 115 all out (59.5 overs)	v	Hampshire; 116/2 (22.4 overs)
Brian White 29; Bob Herman 3/23 (11.5 overs)		Barry Richards 64*; James Merryweather 2/34 (8 overs)

Hampshire won by 8 wickets
Dean Park Cricket Ground, Bournemouth
Umpires: Sam Cook & Charlie Elliott
Player of the match: Barry Richards (Hampshire)

5 July 1972
(scorecard)

Glamorgan; 241/8 (60 overs)	v	Northamptonshire; 198 all out (56.3 overs)
Roy Fredericks 82; John Dye 3/39 (12 overs)		David Steele 41; Majid Khan 4/38 (12 overs)

Glamorgan won by 43 runs
County Ground, Northampton
Umpires: Arthur Jepson & Ken Palmer
Player of the match: Roy Fredericks (Glamorgan)

5 July 1972
(scorecard)

Oxfordshire; 140 all out (60 overs)	v	Durham; 141/6 (30.2 overs)
Robert Montgomerie 64; David Halfyard 2/11 (12 overs)		Alan Burridge 95; Saeed Hatteea 4/32 (9.2 overs)

Durham won by 4 wickets
Morris Motors Sports Ground, Cowley
Umpires: Jack Crapp & George Pope
Player of the match: Alan Burridge (Durham)

5 July 1972
(scorecard)

Sussex; 185/8 (60 overs)	v	Worcestershire; 187/7 (58.5 overs)
Geoff Greenidge 72; James Cumbes 2/43 (12 overs)		Ted Hemsley 73; John Spencer 2/31 (12 overs)

Worcestershire won by 3 wickets
County Ground, Hove
Umpires: Freddie Jakeman & Cec Pepper
Player of the match: Basil D'Oliveira (Worcestershire)

5 July 1972
(scorecard)

Yorkshire; 173/9 (60 overs)	v	Warwickshire; 176/6 (58 overs)
Richard Hutton 61; Bob Willis 4/21 (12 overs)		Rohan Kanhai 62; Don Wilson 3/48 (12 overs)

Warwickshire won by 4 wickets
Headingley, Leeds
Umpires: Ray Julian & Tom Spencer
Player of the match: Rohan Kanhai (Warwickshire)

=== Second round ===
19 July 1972
(scorecard)

Glamorgan; 174 all out (58 overs)	v	Buckinghamshire; 170/9 (60 overs)
Malcolm Nash 45; Fred Harris 4/33 (12 overs)		John Turner 65; John Solanky 3/34 (10 overs)

Glamorgan won by 4 runs
Shardeloes, Amersham
Umpires: John Arnold & Jack Crapp
Player of the match: John Turner (Buckinghamshire)

19 July 1972
(scorecard)

Derbyshire; 214/6 (60 overs)	v	Worcestershire; 215/1 (51.4 overs)
Ian Buxton 81; Basil D'Oliveira 3/40 (12 overs)		Glenn Turner 101*; Ian Buxton 1/45 (10 overs)

Worcestershire won by 9 wickets
County Ground, Derby
Umpires: Dickie Bird & Arthur Fagg
Player of the match: Ian Buxton (Derbyshire)

19 July 1972
(scorecard)

Surrey; 217/9 (60 overs)	v	Durham; 142 all out (52.3 overs)
Micky Stewart 101 (165); David Halfyard 3/35 (12 overs)		George March 78 (141); Stewart Storey 2/13 (8 overs)

Surrey won by 75 runs
Ropery Lane, Chester-le-Street
Umpires: Cec Pepper & Peter Wight
Player of the match: Micky Stewart (Surrey)

19 July 1972
(scorecard)

Middlesex; 41 all out (19.4 overs)	v	Essex; 43/2 (18 overs)
John Murray 12; John Lever 5/8 (9.4 overs)		Keith Fletcher 15*; Mike Selvey 2/13 (9 overs)

Essex won by 8 wickets
Chalkwell Park, Westcliff-on-Sea
Umpires: Lloyd Budd & Alan Whitehead
Player of the match: Keith Boyce (Essex)

19 July 1972
(scorecard)

Kent; 240/9 (60 overs)	v	Gloucestershire; 207 all out (56.2 overs)
Graham Johnson 65; Jack Davey 3/31 (12 overs)		Sadiq Mohammad 53; Bob Woolmer 3/38 (12 overs)

Kent won by 33 runs
St Lawrence Ground, Canterbury
Umpires: Charlie Elliott & George Pope
Player of the match: Graham Johnson (Kent)

19 July 1972
(scorecard)

Lancashire; 243/9 (60 overs)	v	Somerset; 234 all out (58.4 overs)
Clive Lloyd 86; Hallam Moseley 4/36 (12 overs)		Mervyn Kitchen 116; David Hughes 4/61 (12 overs)

Lancashire won by 9 runs
Old Trafford, Manchester
Umpires: John Langridge & Hugo Yarnold
Player of the match: Mervyn Kitchen (Somerset)

19 July 1972
(scorecard)

Hampshire; 283/9 (60 overs)	v	Nottinghamshire; 204 all out (55.3 overs)
Trevor Jesty 62*; Peter Plummer 2/37 (6 overs)		Mike Taylor 58; Trevor Jesty 4/32 (10 overs)

Hampshire won by 79 runs
Trent Bridge, Nottingham
Umpires: David Constant & Eddie Phillipson
Player of the match: Trevor Jesty (Hampshire)

19 July 1972
(scorecard)

Warwickshire; 218/7 (60 overs)	v	Leicestershire; 215 all out (59.4 overs)
Mike Smith 66*; Terry Spencer 4/28 (12 overs)		Paul Haywood 43; Bob Willis 3/38 (12 overs)

Warwickshire won by 3 wickets
Edgbaston, Birmingham
Umpires: Sam Cook & David Evans
Player of the match: Mike Smith (Warwickshire)

=== Quarter-finals ===
2, 3 August 1972
(scorecard)

Kent; 137 all out (52 overs)	v	Essex; 127 all out (57.3 overs)
Asif Iqbal 52; Stuart Turner 3/26 (12 overs)		Brian Edmeades 31; John Shepherd 4/23 (12 overs)

Kent won by 10 runs
County Ground, Leyton
Umpires: John Arnold & Freddie Jakeman
Player of the match: Asif Iqbal (Kent)

- Match was scheduled for one day but extended to two.

2 August 1972
(scorecard)

Hampshire; 223 all out (58.2 overs)	v	Lancashire; 227/6 (58.3 overs)
Barry Richards 129; Peter Lee 3/32 (11 overs)		Barry Wood 66; Thomas Mottram 3/51 (12 overs)

Lancashire won by 4 wickets
Dean Park Cricket Ground, Bournemouth
Umpires: Ken Palmer & Dusty Rhodes
Player of the match: Barry Richards (Hampshire)

2, 3 August 1972
(scorecard)

Warwickshire; 214/9 (60 overs)	v	Glamorgan; 204/9 (60 overs)
Alvin Kallicharran 88; Malcolm Nash 3/56 (12 overs)		Alan Jones 58; Norman McVicker 3/46 (12 overs)

Warwickshire won by 10 runs
Edgbaston, Birmingham
Umpires: Ron Aspinall & Arthur Jepson
Player of the match: Norman McVicker (Warwickshire)

- Match was scheduled for one day but extended to two.

2 August 1972
(scorecard)

Surrey; 106 all out (55.3 overs)	v	Worcestershire; 109/4 (44.4 overs)
Arnold Long 20*; Norman Gifford 4/7 (12 overs)		Basil D'Oliveira 45*; Geoff Arnold 2/26 (12 overs)

Worcestershire won by 6 wickets
New Road, Worcester
Umpires: Ray Julian & Eddie Phillipson
Player of the match: Basil D'Oliveira (Worcestershire)

=== Semi-finals ===
17, 18 August 1972
(scorecard)

Lancashire; 224/6 (60 overs)	v	Kent; 217 all out (60 overs)
Harry Pilling 70; Derek Underwood 3/48 (12 overs)		Mike Denness 65; David Hughes 3/39 (9 overs)

Lancashire won by 7 runs
Old Trafford, Manchester
Umpires: Dickie Bird & George Pope
Player of the match: Harry Pilling (Lancashire)

- Match was scheduled for one day but extended to two.

17 August 1972
(scorecard)

Worcestershire; 174/9 (60 overs)	v	Warwickshire; 175/2 (47.2 overs)
Jim Yardley 52; Bob Willis 3/53 (12 overs)		Rohan Kanhai 85*; Vanburn Holder 2/25 (12 overs)

Warwickshire won by 8 wickets
Edgbaston, Birmingham
Umpires: Bill Alley & David Evans
Player of the match: Rohan Kanhai (Warwickshire)

=== Final ===
2 September 1972
(scorecard)

Warwickshire; 234/9 (60 overs)	v	Lancashire; 235/6 (56.4 overs)
John Whitehouse 68; John Sullivan 2/27 (5 overs)		Clive Lloyd 126; Bob Willis 2/29 (12 overs)

Lancashire won by 4 wickets
Lord's, London
Umpires: Charlie Elliott & Dusty Rhodes
Player of the match: Clive Lloyd (Lancashire)
