= John Lyon (cricketer) =

English cricketer (1951–2010)

Personal information
- Full name: John Lyon
- Born: 17 May 1951; St Helens, Lancashire, England
- Died: 1 January 2010 (aged 58); Krugersdorp, Gauteng, South Africa
- Height: 5 ft 7.5 in (1.71 m)
- Batting: Right-handed
- Role: Wicketkeeper

Domestic team information
- Years: Team
- 1973–1979: Lancashire

Career statistics
Competition	FC	LA
Matches	86	81
Runs scored	1,016	224
Batting average	13.91	11.20
100s/50s	1/2	0/0
Top score	123	31
Catches/stumpings	159/12	66/11
- Source: Cricinfo, 4 January 2010

John Lyon (17 May 1951 – 1 January 2010) was a first-class cricketer who played for Lancashire between 1973 and 1979.

== Early cricket career ==
A wicket-keeper and a lower order right-handed batsman, Lyon played for Lancashire's second eleven in the Minor Counties Championship and the Second Eleven Championship from 1970, while playing club cricket for St Helens Recreation in the Liverpool and District Cricket Competition. He worked as a glass cutter at Pilkington, the glass company whose headquarters are in St Helens.

In 1973, Lyon made his first-class debut for Lancashire in the match against Oxford University, and later that season played in two County Championship games. The following year, 1974, when the regular Lancashire wicket-keeper Farokh Engineer was playing for the Indian touring team, Lyon stepped up to take part in 16 first-team matches, "keeping wicket with distinction and also playing several innings of importance and promise", Wisden noted. His highest score of the season was 48 in the match against the Indian tourists; Engineer did not play in that game.

In the winter of 1974–75, Lyon joined the unofficial tour of South Africa organised by Derrick Robins, which played matches against South African provincial sides despite the ban on official sporting contact because of the apartheid policies. Lyon played in only one first-class match on the tour.

Engineer resumed as Lancashire's first-choice wicket-keeper in 1975 and 1976, leaving Lyon playing mostly for the second team. But in his one first-class match of 1976, against Somerset at Weston-super-Mare, he went in as nightwatchman after 21 wickets had fallen on the first day and Jack Simmons, opening Lancashire's second innings, had been forced to retire hurt after being hit over the eye. Lyon survived that night and went on the next day to make 60, his first innings of more than 50.

== Regular county player ==
After the 1976 season, Engineer went into business, and though Lancashire paid him a retainer, the county did not call on him to play ever again. Lyon became the regular wicket-keeper for the next three seasons, though he appears never to have been entirely sure of his place: the county recruited as well Chris Scott, highly thought of as a wicket-keeper but a poor batsman. The threat to Lyon came at the end of his first regular season: "Lyon performed creditably and played an occasional good innings," wrote Wisden, "but towards the end of the season his form suffered... and for the last three Championship matches Lancashire introduced the 18-year-old Scott and were quite impressed with the youngster's form and promise." Lyon's own batting was disappointing with a top score of only 34 and an average of less than 10 runs per innings, and his 41 dismissals put him 12th on the list of wicket-keepers in the English game for the 1977 season. He did, however, make his one representative appearance in the 1977 season, playing for Marylebone Cricket Club (MCC) in the early-season match with the Australian team that often provided clues to Test match selection. Nine of the MCC team did subsequently play for England but Lyon, who took four catches in the match, was one of two – the other was Allan Jones – who didn't.

Lyon had a better season all round in 1978, rising to equal seventh in the English county wicket-keepers' statistics with 52 dismissals. Lyon had "found his touch again", said Wisden. His batting also improved and in the match against Nottinghamshire at Old Trafford Cricket Ground he put on 161 for the seventh wicket with Simmons, making an unbeaten 74 himself, his highest first-class score to date. Without that innings, however, Lyon's batting average for the season would still have been below 10 runs an innings.

The batting was better in 1979 and Lyon's aggregate of 313 runs and average of 22.35 were his best in first-class cricket. Much of that improvement was due to one innings: against Warwickshire at Old Trafford, he was sent in again as a nightwatchman after Lancashire had been forced to follow on and two quick wickets had fallen. As at Weston three years earlier, Lyon not only survived but prospered: he made 123 and, after the deficit had been overhauled, shared in an eighth wicket stand of 158 with Bob Ratcliffe which remains the Lancashire record for that wicket in first-class cricket. Ratcliffe also scored the only century of his career in this innings. The wicket-keeping for Lyon was less satisfactory, though, and he made only 32 dismissals in the season. He lost his place to Scott for the last matches and was not offered a new contract at the end of the season.

== After first-class cricket ==
Lyon was only 28 when his career with Lancashire came to an end. In an annual published the following year, his name is linked with Sussex, but nothing came of this, and he did not play first-class cricket again. Instead, he went to Ireland where he was associated with clubs at Bangor and Clontarf as a coach. He later settled in South Africa where he ran a bar, and he died there on 1 January 2010.

Lyon was married in 1972 to Cynthia Mary. He also played rugby league.
