= Jacklin =

Jacklin is a surname. Notable people with the name include:

- Carol Nagy Jacklin (1939–2011), American psychologist & academic
- Harley M. Jacklin (1889–1970), American farmer, businessman, and politician
- Harold Jacklin (1897–1966), English footballer
- John Jacklin (born 1947), English cricketer
- Julia Jacklin (born 1990), Australian singer-songwriter
- Mandy Jacklin (born 1966), British lawn bowler
- Paula Jacklin (born 1957), English darts player
- Philip Jacklin (born 1952), British cross-country skier
- Tony Jacklin (born 1944), English professional golfer
