= Mike Westcott =

English cricketer

Personal information
- Full name: Frederick Michael Westcott
- Born: 20 November 1941 (age 84); Corbridge, Northumberland, England
- Batting: Right-handed

Domestic team information
- Years: Team
- 1965–1969: Durham

Career statistics
Competition	List A
Matches	2
Runs scored	47
Batting average	23.50
100s/50s	–/–
Top score	47
Balls bowled	–
Wickets	–
Bowling average	–
5 wickets in innings	–
10 wickets in match	–
Best bowling	–
Catches/stumpings	1/–
- Source: Cricinfo, 7 August 2011

Frederick Michael Westcott (born 20 November 1941) is a former English cricketer. Westcott was a right-handed batsman. He was born in Corbridge, Northumberland.

Westcott made his debut for Durham against the Yorkshire Second XI in the 1965 Minor Counties Championship. He played Minor counties cricket for Durham from 1965 to 1969, making 23 Minor Counties Championship appearances. He made his List A debut against Nottinghamshire in the 1967 Gillette Cup. In this match, he scored 47 runs before being dismissed by Barry Stead. He made a further List A appearance against Worcestershire in the 1968 Gillette Cup. He was dismissed for a duck in this match by Len Coldwell, with Worcestershire winning by 16 runs.
