= David Norman =

David Norman may refer to:

- David Norman (Australian footballer) (1942–2025), Australian rules footballer
- David Norman (ornithologist) (born 1949), British physicist and ornithologist
- David Norman (soccer) (born 1962), Canadian soccer player
- David Norman Jr. (born 1998), Canadian soccer player, son of David Norman born 1962
- David B. Norman (born 1952), British palaeontologist
- David Norman (cricketer) (born 1968), former English cricketer
- David Luke Norman (1924–1995), American attorney and judge
