= Cameron Green (disambiguation) =

Cameron Green (born 1999) is an Australian cricketer.

Cameron Green may also refer to:-

- Cameron Green (English cricketer) (born 1968), played for Cambridgeshire County Cricket Club
- Cameron Green (footballer) (born 1999), English footballer, see 2024–25 National League Cup
