= 1975 Gillette Cup =

- Administrator: Test and County Cricket Board
- Cricket format: Limited overs cricket (60 overs per innings)
- Tournament format: Knockout
- Champions: Lancashire (4th title)
- Participants: 22
- Matches: 21
- Most runs: 275 Sadiq Mohammad (Gloucestershire)
- Most wickets: 10 Mike Hendrick (Derbyshire)
- Official website: CricketArchive tournament page

The 1975 Gillette Cup was the thirteenth Gillette Cup, an English limited overs county cricket tournament. It was held between 25 June and 6 September 1975. The tournament was won by Lancashire County Cricket Club who defeated Middlesex County Cricket Club by 7 wickets in the final at Lord's.

== Format ==
The seventeen first-class counties, were joined by five Minor Counties: Buckinghamshire, Cambridgeshire, Cornwall, Oxfordshire and Staffordshire. Teams who won in the first round progressed to the second round. The winners in the second round then progressed to the quarter-final stage. Winners from the quarter-finals then progressed to the semi-finals from which the winners then went on to the final at Lord's which was held on 6 September 1975.

=== First round ===
25 June 1975
(scorecard)

Northamptonshire; 210 all out (59.5 overs)	v	Cambridgeshire; 141 all out (41.5 overs)
David Steele 109; Douglas Collard 3/38 (11 overs)		Alan Ponder 57; John Dye 3/14 (6 overs)

Northamptonshire won by 69 runs
The Avenue Sports Club Ground, March
Umpires: John Langridge & Peter Rochford
Player of the match: David Steele (Northamptonshire)

25 June 1975
(scorecard)

Middlesex; 267/4 (60 overs)	v	Buckinghamshire; 168/7 (60 overs)
Mike Brearley 124*; Fred Harris 1/33 (12 overs)		Stuart York 73*; Phil Edmonds 3/47 (12 overs)

Middlesex won by 99 runs
Lord's, London
Umpires: Dusty Rhodes & Tom Spencer
Player of the match: Mike Brearley (Middlesex)

25 June 1975
(scorecard)

Nottinghamshire; 212/9 (60 overs)	v	Sussex; 208 all out (60 overs)
Bill Taylor 63; Tony Greig 3/60 (12 overs)		Tony Greig 62; Clive Rice 3/29 (12 overs)

Nottinghamshire won by 4 runs
Trent Bridge, Nottingham
Umpires: Ray Julian & Cec Pepper
Player of the match: Bill Taylor (Nottinghamshire)

25 June 1975
(scorecard)

Cornwall; 171 all out (52.2 overs)	v	Oxfordshire; 175/4 (53.3 overs)
Brian Laity 66; Brian Jeffries 3/31 (11.2 overs)		John Potter 75*; Michael Trenwith 2/21 (12 overs)

Oxfordshire won by 6 wickets
Morris Motors Sports Ground, Cowley
Umpires: Jack Crapp & Alan Whitehead
Player of the match: John Potter (Oxfordshire)

25 June 1975
(scorecard)

Leicestershire; 287/4 (60 overs)	v	Staffordshire; 73 all out (37 overs)
Barry Dudleston 118; Keith Stride 2/32 (12 overs)		Richard Downend 24; Ken Higgs 6/20 (12 overs)

Leicestershire won by 214 runs
Longton Cricket Club Ground, Stoke-on-Trent
Umpires: Ron Aspinall & Arthur Jepson
Player of the match: Barry Dudleston (Leicestershire)

25 June 1975
(scorecard)

Surrey; 193/9 (60 overs)	v	Somerset; 194/9 (60 overs)
Graham Roope 66; Hallam Moseley 3/40 (12 overs)		Graham Burgess 44; Geoff Arnold 4/19 (12 overs)

Somerset won by 1 wicket
The Oval, London
Umpires: Robert Barnard & Peter Wight
Player of the match: Graham Burgess (Somerset)

=== Second round ===
16 July 1975
(scorecard)

Gloucestershire; 244/7 (60 overs)	v	Oxfordshire; 167 all out (56 overs)
Zaheer Abbas 88; Dennis Lock 3/44 (11 overs)		Brian Jeffries 46; Sadiq Mohammad 3/19 (3 overs)

Gloucestershire won by 77 runs
Ashley Down Ground, Bristol
Umpires: Bill Alley & Peter Wight
Player of the match: Zaheer Abbas (Gloucestershire)

16 July 1975
(scorecard)

Hampshire; 371/4 (60 overs)	v	Glamorgan; 207 all out (50.1 overs)
Gordon Greenidge 177; Malcolm Nash 2/84 (12 overs)		John Solanky 51; Andy Roberts 3/17 (8.1 overs)

Hampshire won by 164 runs
County Ground, Southampton
Umpires: Ray Julian & Ken Palmer
Player of the match: Gordon Greenidge (Hampshire)

16, 17 July 1975
(scorecard)

Northamptonshire; 106 all out (60 overs)	v	Lancashire; 107/1 (60 overs)
Mushtaq Mohammad 24; Peter Lever 4/18 (12 overs)		Frank Hayes 56*

Lancashire won by 9 wickets
Old Trafford, Manchester
Umpires: Eddie Phillipson & Alan Whitehead
Player of the match: Peter Lever (Lancashire)

- Match was scheduled for one day but extended to two.

16 July 1975
(scorecard)

Nottinghamshire; 247/8 (60 overs)	v	Kent; 216 all out (55.5 overs)
Basher Hassan 50; Kevin Jarvis 3/58 (9 overs)		Bob Woolmer 78; Clive Rice 3/41 (12 overs)

Nottinghamshire won by 31 runs
Trent Bridge, Nottingham
Umpires: Arthur Jepson & Cec Pepper
Player of the match: Bob Woolmer (Kent)

16, 17 July 1975
(scorecard)

Derbyshire; 200/6 (60 overs)	v	Somerset; 197/9 (60 overs)
Brian Bolus 63; Hallam Moseley 3/34 (12 overs)		Peter Denning 60; Philip Russell 3/44 (12 overs)

Derbyshire won by 3 runs
County Ground, Taunton
Umpires: Lloyd Budd & Peter Rochford
Player of the match: Frederick Swarbrook (Derbyshire)

- Match was scheduled for one day but extended to two.

16 July 1975
(scorecard)

Middlesex; 238/6 (60 overs)	v	Warwickshire; 111 all out (47.2 overs)
Mike Brearley 82; Steve Perryman 2/29 (12 overs)		Deryck Murray 27; Fred Titmus 4/14 (12 overs)

Middlesex won by 127 runs
Edgbaston, Birmingham
Umpires: Ron Aspinall & David Evans
Player of the match: Graham Barlow (Middlesex)

16 July 1975
(scorecard)

Worcestershire; 261/7 (60 overs)	v	Essex; 141 all out (49.1 overs)
John Parker 79; David Acfield 2/51 (12 overs)		Brian Hardie 31; Basil D'Oliveira 4/32 (12 overs)

Worcestershire won by 112 runs
New Road, Worcester
Umpires: David Constant & Sam Cook
Player of the match: Imran Khan (Worcestershire)

16 July 1975
(scorecard)

Yorkshire; 109 all out (48.5 overs)	v	Leicestershire; 111/9 (52.3 overs)
Arnie Sidebottom 35; Peter Booth 3/15 (10.5 overs)		Chris Balderstone 35; Howard Cooper 4/18 (12 overs)

Leicestershire won by 1 wicket
Headingley, Leeds
Umpires: Henry Horton & Don Oslear
Player of the match: Norman McVicker (Leicestershire)

=== Quarter-finals ===
6 August 1975
(scorecard)

Hampshire; 98 all out (43.1 overs)	v	Lancashire; 101/4 (31.5 overs)
Gordon Greenidge 25; Barry Wood 4/17 (12 overs)		Frank Hayes 44*; Andy Roberts 2/17 (9 overs)

Lancashire won by 6 wickets
Old Trafford, Manchester
Umpires: David Constant & Eddie Phillipson
Player of the match: Bob Ratcliffe (Lancashire)

6 August 1975
(scorecard)

Gloucestershire; 314/4 (60 overs)	v	Leicestershire; 282/9 (60 overs)
Zaheer Abbas 131*; Ken Higgs 2/56 (12 overs)		Roger Tolchard 86*; David Graveney 3/67 (12 overs)

Gloucestershire won by 32 runs
Grace Road, Leicester
Umpires: Don Oslear & Dusty Rhodes
Player of the match: Zaheer Abbas (Gloucestershire)

6 August 1975
(scorecard)

Nottinghamshire; 166 all out (54.2 overs)	v	Derbyshire; 167/4 (54.2 overs)
Derek Randall 43; Mike Hendrick 4/26 (9.2 overs)		Brian Bolus 49*; Trevor Tunnicliffe 1/13 (6 overs)

Derbyshire won by 6 wickets
Trent Bridge, Nottingham
Umpires: Arthur Fagg & Barrie Meyer
Player of the match: Mike Hendrick (Derbyshire)

6 August 1975
(scorecard)

Worcestershire; 257 all out (59.5 overs)	v	Middlesex; 258/2 (54 overs)
John Parker 107; John Price 3/50 (12 overs)		Clive Radley 105*; John Inchmore 2/39 (12 overs)

Middlesex won by 8 wickets
New Road, Worcester
Umpires: Robert Barnard & Lloyd Budd
Player of the match: Clive Radley (Middlesex)

=== Semi-finals ===
20 August 1975
(scorecard)

Middlesex; 207 all out (58.5 overs)	v	Derbyshire; 183 all out (56.1 overs)
Norman Featherstone 70; Mike Hendrick 4/16 (11.5 overs)		Ron Headley 58; Mike Selvey 2/32 (10.1 overs)

Middlesex won by 21 runs
Queen's Park, Chesterfield
Umpires: David Constant & Ken Palmer
Player of the match: Norman Featherstone (Middlesex)

20 August 1975
(scorecard)

Gloucestershire; 236 all out (60 overs)	v	Lancashire; 239/7 (59.3 overs)
Sadiq Mohammad 122; Barry Wood 2/39 (12 overs)		Barry Wood 63; Roger Knight 3/48 (10 overs)

Lancashire won by 3 wickets
Old Trafford, Manchester
Umpires: Bill Alley & Tom Spencer
Player of the match: Sadiq Mohammad (Gloucestershire)

=== Final ===
6 September 1975
(scorecard)

Middlesex; 180/8 (60 overs)	v	Lancashire; 182/3 (57 overs)
Larry Gomes 44; Bob Ratcliffe 3/25 (12 overs)		Clive Lloyd 73*; Mike Selvey 1/21 (12 overs)

Lancashire won by 7 wickets
Lord's, London
Umpires: Dickie Bird & John Langridge
Player of the match: Clive Lloyd (Lancashire)
