= Douglas Vincent =

Douglas Vincent may refer to:

- Douglas Vincent (cricketer) (born 1954), Scottish cricketer
- Douglas Vincent (Australian Army officer) (1916–1995), general in the Australian Army
