= Andrew Lyon =

English cricketer

Personal information
- Full name: Andrew Walker Lyon
- Born: 18 December 1946 (age 79); Poole, Dorset, England
- Batting: Right-handed
- Bowling: Right-arm off break
- Relatives: David Lyon (brother)

Domestic team information
- Years: Team
- 1981: Middlesex
- 1977–1988: Buckinghamshire

Career statistics
Competition	List A
Matches	7
Runs scored	8
Batting average	1.60
100s/50s	–/–
Top score	4
Balls bowled	390
Wickets	7
Bowling average	36.00
5 wickets in innings	–
10 wickets in match	–
Best bowling	3/71
Catches/stumpings	1/–
- Source: Cricinfo, 7 May 2011

Andrew Walker Lyon (born 18 December 1946) is a former English cricketer. Lyon was a right-handed batsman who bowled right-arm off break. He was born in Poole, Dorset.

== Cricket career ==
Lyon made his debut for Buckinghamshire in the 1977 Minor Counties Championship against Hertfordshire. Lyon played Minor counties cricket for Buckinghamshire from 1977 to 1988, which included 110 Minor Counties Championship matches and nine MCCA Knockout Trophy matches. In 1979, he made his List A debut for Buckinghamshire against Suffolk in the Gillette Cup. He played five further List A matches for Buckinghamshire, the last coming against Kent in the 1988 NatWest Trophy. In his six List A matches for the county, he took 5 wickets at an average of 42.80, with best figures of 3 for 71. In 1981, he appeared in a single List A match for Middlesex against the touring Sri Lankans. He took two wickets in the match, those of Anura Ranasinghe and Yohan Goonasekera. His brother, David, played Minor counties and List A cricket for Cambridgeshire.
