= David Lyon (cricketer) =

English cricketer

Personal information
- Full name: David Walker Lyon
- Born: 2 July 1943 (age 83); Douglas, Isle of Man
- Batting: Right-handed
- Bowling: Right-arm fast-medium
- Relatives: Andrew Lyon (brother)

Domestic team information
- Years: Team
- 1965–1972: Cambridgeshire

Career statistics
Competition	List A
Matches	1
Runs scored	0
Batting average	–
100s/50s	0/0
Top score	0*
Balls bowled	72
Wickets	1
Bowling average	44.00
5 wickets in innings	0
10 wickets in match	0
Best bowling	1/44
Catches/stumpings	0/–
- Source: Cricinfo, 23 July 2010

David Walker Lyon (born 2 September 1943) is a former English cricketer. Lyon was a right-handed batsman who bowled right-arm fast-medium. He was born at Douglas, Isle of Man.

Lyon made his debut for Cambridgeshire in the 1965 Minor Counties Championship against Bedfordshire. From 1965 to 1972, he represented the county in 15 Minor Counties matches, with his final appearance coming against Bedfordshire.

Lyon also represented Cambridgeshire in a single List A cricket match against Buckinghamshire in the 1972 Gillette Cup. In his only List-A match, he took a single wicket at with figures of 1/44.

His brother, Andrew, played List A cricket for Buckinghamshire and Middlesex.
