= Harry Pougher =

English cricketer

Personal information
- Full name: Harry Pougher
- Born: 1 February 1941; Scunthorpe, Lincolnshire, England
- Died: 19 July 2014 (aged 73); Lincoln, England
- Batting: Right-handed
- Bowling: Right-arm off break

Domestic team information
- Years: Team
- 1959–1988: Lincolnshire

Career statistics
| Competition | List A |
|---|---|
| Matches | 4 |
| Runs scored | 112 |
| Batting average | 28.00 |
| 100s/50s | –/1 |
| Top score | 54 |
| Balls bowled | – |
| Wickets | – |
| Bowling average | – |
| 5 wickets in innings | – |
| 10 wickets in match | – |
| Best bowling | – |
| Catches/stumpings | 1/– |
- Source: Cricinfo, 25 June 2011

Harry Pougher (1 February 1941 – 19 July 2014) was an English cricketer. Pougher was a right-handed batsman who bowled right-arm off break. He was born in Scunthorpe, Lincolnshire.

Pougher made his debut for Lincolnshire in the 1959 Minor Counties Championship against the Leicestershire Second XI. Pougher played Minor counties cricket for Lincolnshire from 1959 to 1988, which included 123 Minor Counties Championship matches and 10 MCCA Knockout Trophy matches. He made his List A debut against Hampshire in the 1967 Gillette Cup. He played 3 further List A matches for Lincolnshire, the last coming against Lancashire in the 1988 NatWest Trophy. In his 4 matches, he scored 112 runs at an average of 28.00, with a high score of 54. This came against Hampshire in his debut List A match.

Altogether Harry Pougher played 145 matches for Lincolnshire, scoring 5532 runs, an aggregate only exceeded by three other players. He became captain of the county side. Pougher was also a well known and respected club cricketer. He first played in the Yorkshire Council league for Appleby Frodingham in the 50s and 60s before leaving Scunthorpe for Lincoln in 1967 due to taking a job as head of PE in Secondary school. In 1968 he joined Ruston Bucyrus in the Lincolnshire League and played there for many years until he joined Lindum Cricket Club in 1985, became captain and then in 1990 was elected as chairman. He was also chair of Lincolnshire Cricket Association until it merged with Lincolnshire Cricket Board.

Harry Pougher was a talented coach. He not only coached youngsters within his club and county but also at centres of excellence. Mike Atherton and Mark Ramprakash who went on to play for England were both coached by Harry Pougher when they were promising 13-year-olds. In 2011, Pougher was presented with Lincolnshire Sports Foundation's lifetime achievement award and one of the many tributes paid to him was from Michael Atherton.

Harry Pougher realised the potential of Kwik Cricket in introducing youngsters to the game and he became the county's Kwik Cricket organizer. He persuaded the Lincoln Youth League to introduce the very first Kwik Cricket league in the country.

When Harry Pougher arrived at Lindum cricket club in 1985 there were three junior sides. In the 2014 season there were ten sides. The culmination of all his efforts was in 2011 when the club's Under 15 side won the National U15 Championship. He ceased being the club's chairman the same year when he was elected as the club's President. He was also President of the Lincolnshire Premier League.

In 2010 Harry Pougher contracted Multiple Systems Atrophy, a very rare complaint for which there is no treatment. He began using a wheelchair. He died on 19 July 2014.
