= Alan Ponder =

English cricketer

Personal information
- Full name: Alan Mervyn Ponder
- Born: 22 August 1947 (age 79); Cambridge, Cambridgeshire, England
- Batting: Left-handed
- Role: Wicket-keeper

Domestic team information
- Years: Team
- 1966–1984: Cambridgeshire

Career statistics
Competition	List A
Matches	5
Runs scored	75
Batting average	15.00
100s/50s	–/1
Top score	57
Balls bowled	–
Wickets	–
Bowling average	–
5 wickets in innings	–
10 wickets in match	–
Best bowling	–
Catches/stumpings	5/–
- Source: Cricinfo, 23 April 2011

Alan Mervyn Ponder (born 22 August 1947) is a former English cricketer. Ponder was a left-handed batsman who fielded as a wicket-keeper. He was born in Cambridge, Cambridgeshire.

Ponder made his debut for Cambridgeshire in the 1966 Minor Counties Championship against the Nottinghamshire Second XI. Ponder played Minor counties cricket for Cambridgeshire from 1966 to 1984, including 112 Minor Counties Championship matches and 3 MCCA Knockout Trophy matches. In 1967, he made his List A debut against Yorkshire in the Gillette Cup. He played 4 further List A matches for Cambridgeshire, the last coming against Middlesex in the 1983 NatWest Trophy. In his five List A matches, he scored 75 runs at a batting average of 15.00, with a single half century high score of 57. This came against Northamptonshire in 1975.
