= Percy Davis (Northamptonshire cricketer) =

English cricketer

Personal information
- Full name: Charles Percival Davis
- Born: 24 May 1915; Brackley, Northamptonshire, England
- Died: 4 July 2001 (aged 86); Leicester, England
- Batting: Right-handed
- Bowling: Right-arm medium
- Relatives: Eddie Davis (brother)

Domestic team information
- Years: Team
- 1935–1952: Northamptonshire

Career statistics
Competition	First-class
Matches	169
Runs scored	6,363
Batting average	22.64
100s/50s	10/19
Top score	237
Balls bowled	852
Wickets	6
Bowling average	81.83
5 wickets in innings	0
10 wickets in match	0
Best bowling	2/13
Catches/stumpings	72/10
- Source: CricInfo, 29 March 2016

Charles Percival Davis (24 May 1915 – 4 July 2001), known as Percy Davis, was an English cricketer active from 1935 to 1957 who played for Northamptonshire County Cricket Club. He appeared in 169 first-class matches as a right-handed batsman. He was an occasional wicket-keeper and right arm medium pace seam bowler. Davis was born in Brackley, Northamptonshire on 24 May 1915 and died in Leicester on 4 July 2001. He scored 6,363 runs in first-class cricket with a highest score of 237, one of ten centuries. He was the elder brother of Eddie Davis.

== Notes ==
- Playfair Cricket Annual – 1948 edition
