= David Janes =

English cricketer

Personal information
- Full name: David Allan Janes
- Born: 15 January 1944; Beaconsfield, Buckinghamshire, England
- Died: 15 September 1987 (aged 43); King's College Hospital, London, England
- Batting: Left-handed

Domestic team information
- Years: Team
- 1960–1976: Buckinghamshire

Career statistics
Competition	List A
Matches	4
Runs scored	135
Batting average	33.75
100s/50s	–/1
Top score	95
Balls bowled	–
Wickets	–
Bowling average	–
5 wickets in innings	–
10 wickets in match	–
Best bowling	–
Catches/stumpings	3/–
- Source: Cricinfo, 7 May 2011

David Allan Janes (15 January 1944 – 15 September 1987) was an English cricketer. Janes was a left-handed batsman. He was born in Beaconsfield, Buckinghamshire and educated at Marlborough College.

Janes made his debut for Buckinghamshire in the 1960 Minor Counties Championship against Hertfordshire. Janes played Minor counties cricket for Buckinghamshire from 1960 to 1976, which included 94 Minor Counties Championship matches. He scored 3,802 runs in these matches at an average of 26.59. In 1965, he made his List A debut against Middlesex in the Gillette Cup. He played 3 further List A matches for Buckinghamshire, the last coming against Glamorgan in the 1972 Gillette Cup. In his 4 List A matches, he scored 135 runs at a batting average of 33.75, with a single half century high score of 95. His highest score came against Cambridgeshire in the 1972 Gillette Cup.

He died at King's College Hospital, London on 15 September 1987.
