= Frederick Harris (cricketer) =

English cricketer (1934–2023)

Fred Harris
Personal information
- Full name: Frederick William Harris
- Born: 12 November 1934; Chesham, Buckinghamshire, England
- Died: 11 October 2023 (aged 88); Buckinghamshire, England
- Batting: Right-handed
- Bowling: Right-arm fast-medium

Domestic team information
- Years: Team
- 1957–1976: Buckinghamshire

Career statistics
Competition	List A
Matches	7
Runs scored	30
Batting average	6.00
100s/50s	–/–
Top score	13
Balls bowled	456
Wickets	11
Bowling average	19.45
5 wickets in innings	–
10 wickets in match	–
Best bowling	4/21
Catches/stumpings	–/–
- Source: Cricinfo, 7 May 2011

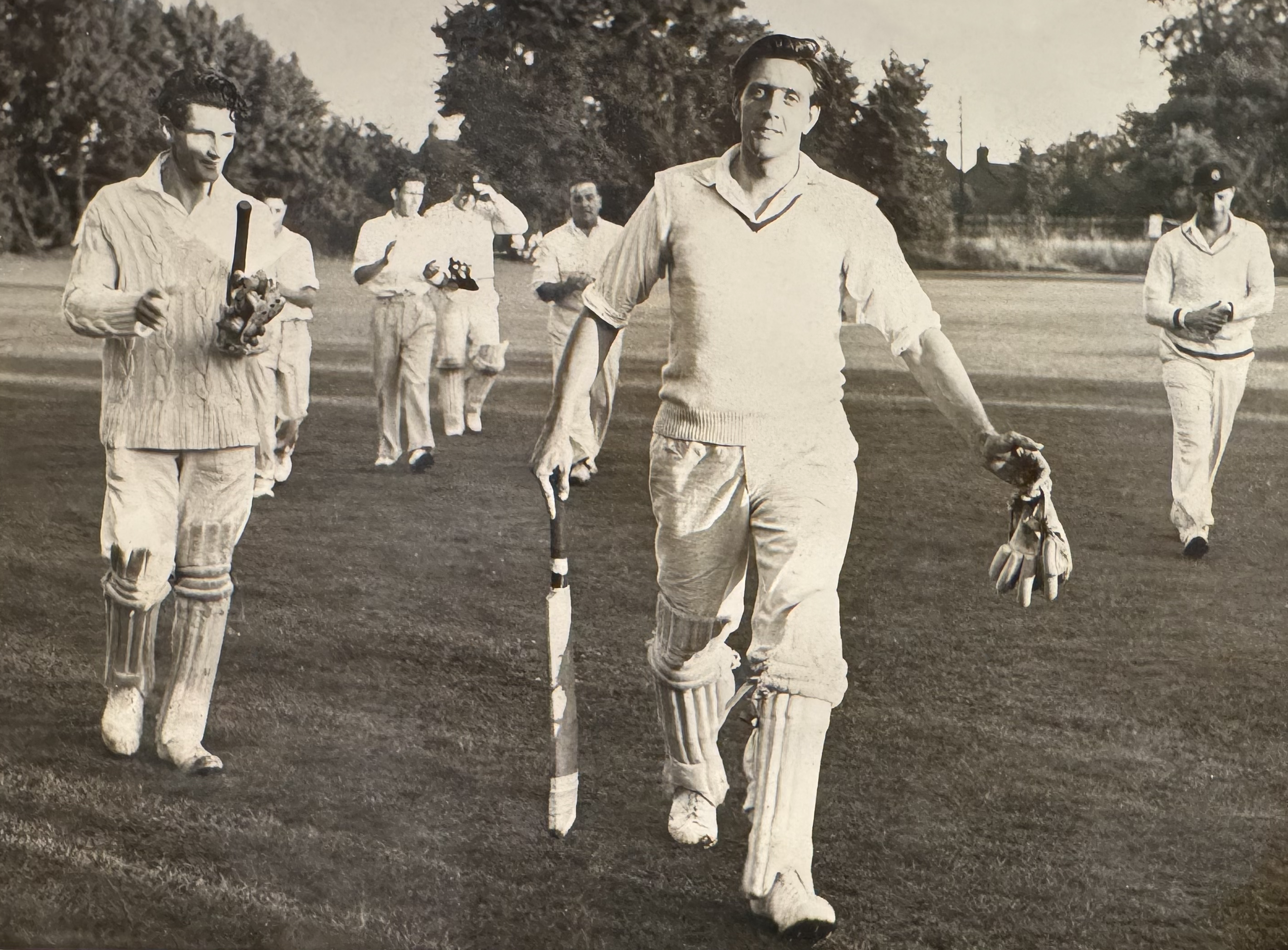
Fred Harris, circa 1965

Frederick William Harris (12 November 1934 – 11 October 2023) was an English cricketer. Harris was a right-handed batsman who bowled right-arm fast-medium. He was born in Chesham, Buckinghamshire.

Harris made his debut for Buckinghamshire in the 1957 Minor Counties Championship against Norfolk. Harris played Minor counties cricket for Buckinghamshire from 1957 to 1976, which included 90 Minor Counties Championship matches. In 1965, he made his List A debut against Middlesex in the Gillette Cup. He played 6 further List A matches for Buckinghamshire, the last coming against Middlesex in the 1975 Gillette Cup. In his 6 List A matches, he scored 30 runs at a batting average of 6.00, with a high score of 13. With the ball he took 11 wickets at a bowling average of 19.45, with best figures of 4/21. His best figures came against Cambridgeshire, where in partnership with Raymond Bond (5/17), he helped bowl Cambridgeshire out for 41. This at the time was the joint lowest total a team had been bowled out for in List A cricket.

Harris died in Buckinghamshire on 10 October 2023, aged 88.
