= John Turner (Minor Counties cricketer) =

English cricketer

Personal information
- Full name: John Bernard Turner
- Born: 2 January 1949; Princes Risborough, Buckinghamshire, England
- Died: 13 September 2012 (aged 63); Calne, Wiltshire, England
- Batting: Right-handed
- Bowling: Slow left-arm orthodox

Domestic team information
- Years: Team
- 1976: Minor Counties West
- 1974: Minor Counties
- 1972–1975: Minor Counties South
- 1968–1983: Buckinghamshire

Career statistics
Competition	First-class	List A
Matches	1	20
Runs scored	127	398
Batting average	63.50	19.90
100s/50s	1/–	–/4
Top score	106	88
Balls bowled	–	–
Wickets	–	–
Bowling average	–	–
5 wickets in innings	–	–
10 wickets in match	–	–
Best bowling	–	–
Catches/stumpings	1/–	9/–
- Source: Cricinfo, 8 May 2011

John Bernard Turner (2 January 1949 – 13 September 2012) was an English cricketer. Turner was a right-handed batsman who bowled slow left-arm orthodox. He was born at Princes Risborough, Buckinghamshire.

Turner made his debut for Buckinghamshire in the 1968 Minor Counties Championship against Berkshire. Turner played Minor counties cricket for Buckinghamshire from 1968 to 1983, which included 151 Minor Counties Championship matches and a single MCCA Knockout Trophy match. In 1969, he made his List A debut for Buckinghamshire against Middlesex in the Gillette Cup. He played eight further List A matches for the county, the last coming against Suffolk in the 1979 Gillette Cup. In his nine List A appearances for the county, he scored 254 runs at a batting average of 31.75, with three half centuries and a high score of 88. This came against Kent in the 1972 Gillette Cup.

He played the majority of his List A matches not for Buckinghamshire, but for the Minor Counties South and Minor Counties West teams, making eight and four appearances respectively. For Minor Counties South, he scored 126 runs at an average of 15.75, with a single half century high score of 56. In his career, Turner also made a single first-class appearance for a combined Minor Counties cricket team against the touring Pakistanis in 1974. In this match, he scored 21 runs in the Minor Counties first-innings before being dismissed by Asif Masood, while in their second-innings he scored a century, making 106 runs before being dismissed by the same bowler. This left him with a first-class batting average of 63.50.

He died at Calne, Wiltshire, on 13 September 2012.
