= Eddie Davis (cricketer) =

English cricketer

Personal information
- Full name: Edward Davis
- Born: 8 March 1922; Brackley, Northamptonshire, England
- Died: 16 July 2011 (aged 89); Norwich, Norfolk, England
- Batting: Right-handed
- Relatives: Percy Davis (brother)

Domestic team information
- Years: Team
- 1947–1956: Northamptonshire
- 1958–1967: Cambridgeshire

Career statistics
Competition	First-class	List A
Matches	104	1
Runs scored	4,126	6
Batting average	28.45	6.00
100s/50s	3/26	0/0
Top score	171	6
Balls bowled	13	–
Wickets	1	–
Bowling average	8.00	–
5 wickets in innings	0	–
10 wickets in match	0	–
Best bowling	1/0	–
Catches/stumpings	27/–	0/–
- Source: Cricinfo, 4 September 2011

Edward Davis (8 March 1922 – 16 July 2011) was an English cricketer. He was a right-handed batsman.

Davis was born in Brackley, Northamptonshire. He made his first-class debut for Northamptonshire against Hampshire in the 1947 County Championship. He made 103 further first-class appearances for Northamptonshire, the last of which came against Essex in the 1956 County Championship. In his 104 first-class appearances, he scored 4,126 runs at an average of 28.45, with a high score of 171. He made three centuries and 26 half centuries, which showed an inconsistency to make go on and make big scores. His highest score of 171 came against Leicestershire in the 1949 County Championship, which was his most successful season with 851 runs at an average of 34.04. He left Northamptonshire at the end of the 1957 season.

In 1958, he joined Cambridgeshire. He made his debut for the county in the Minor Counties Championship against Lincolnshire. He played Minor counties cricket for Cambridgeshire from 1958 to 1963, making 40 appearances. Three seasons after last playing for the county, Davis made a single List A appearance for Cambridgeshire against Yorkshire in the 1967 Gillette Cup. In this match, he scored 6 runs before being dismissed by Don Wilson, with Cambridgeshire being bowled out for 43 and Yorkshire winning the match by 6 wickets.

After retiring Davis worked as a PE teacher at Wisbech Grammar School. His older brother, Percy, also played first-class cricket for Northamptonshire.
