= Stuart Jakeman =

English cricketer

Ronald Stuart Jakeman (20 September 1943 – 24 December 2013) was an English cricketer active from 1959 to 1966 who played for Northamptonshire (Northants).

He was born in Holmfirth, the son of Freddie Jakeman. He appeared in three first-class matches as a lefthanded batsman who scored 31 runs with a highest score of 20. He died in 2013
