= Brian Gadsby =

English cricketer

Personal information
- Full name: Charles Brian Gadsby
- Born: 30 June 1933 (age 93); Wimpole, Cambridgeshire, England
- Batting: Right-handed
- Bowling: Slow left-arm orthodox
- Relatives: Nigel Gadsby (son) Shaun Gadsby (son)

Domestic team information
- Years: Team
- 1956–1976: Cambridgeshire

Career statistics
Competition	List A
Matches	5
Runs scored	14
Batting average	7.00
100s/50s	–/–
Top score	8
Balls bowled	210
Wickets	3
Bowling average	32.00
5 wickets in innings	–
10 wickets in match	–
Best bowling	2/34
Catches/stumpings	2/–
- Source: Cricinfo, 25 April 2011

Charles Brian Gadsby (born 30 June 1933) is a former English cricketer. Gadsby was a right-handed batsman who bowled slow left-arm orthodox. He was born in Wimpole, Cambridgeshire. He was known in cricketing circles by his middle name.

Gadsby attended The Perse School where he represented the 1st XI Cricket in his last 3 years. Throughout his career he played for Royston CC and was later joined by his two sons Nigel and Shaun after they finished school.

Gadsby made his debut for Cambridgeshire in the 1956 Minor Counties Championship against the Essex Second XI. Gadsby played Minor counties cricket for Cambridgeshire from 1956 to 1976, which included 95 Minor Counties Championship matches. In 1964, he made his List A debut against Essex in the Gillette Cup. He played four further List A matches for Cambridgeshire, the last coming against Buckinghamshire in 1972. In his five List A matches, he scored 14 runs at a batting average of 7.00, with a high score of 8. With the ball he took 3 wickets at a bowling average of 32.00, with best figures of 2/34.

In his youth he played field hockey for Cambridgeshire. His eldest son Nigel has played List A and Minor counties cricket for Cambridgeshire. While his youngest son Shaun represented Cambridge in rugby.
