= Dennis Lock =

English cricketer (born 1950)

Personal information
- Full name: Dennis Gordon Lock
- Born: 16 August 1950 (age 76); Oxford, Oxfordshire, England
- Batting: Right-handed
- Bowling: Right-arm medium

Domestic team information
- Years: Team
- 1972–1977: Oxfordshire

Career statistics
Competition	List A
Matches	2
Runs scored	0
Batting average	0.00
100s/50s	–/–
Top score	0
Balls bowled	114
Wickets	5
Bowling average	11.40
5 wickets in innings	–
10 wickets in match	–
Best bowling	3/44
Catches/stumpings	–/–
- Source: Cricinfo, 24 May 2011

Dennis Gordon Lock (born 16 August 1950) is a former English cricketer. Lock was a right-handed batsman who bowled right-arm medium pace. He was born in Oxford, Oxfordshire.

Lock made his debut for Oxfordshire in the 1972 Minor Counties Championship against Dorset. Lock played Minor counties cricket for Oxfordshire from 1972 to 1977 which included 24 Minor Counties Championship matches. He made his List A debut against Cornwall in the 1975 Gillette Cup. In this match he took the wickets of Christopher Chaplin and Michael Snowdon for the cost of 13 runs from 8 overs. He played a further List A match against Gloucester in the 2nd round of the same competition. In his second match, he took 3 wickets for the cost of 44 runs from 11 overs. With the bat he was dismissed for a duck by Sadiq Mohammad. In total, he took 5 wickets at a bowling average of 11.40.
