= Shaun Gadsby =

English rugby union player

- Born: 20 May 1963 Wimpole, Cambridgeshire, England
- Died: 22 April 2015 (aged 51)
- School: Felsted School
- Notable relative(s): Brian Gadsby (father); Nigel Gadsby (brother)
- Occupation: Farmer

Rugby union career
- Position: Openside Flanker
Amateur team(s)
Years	Team	Apps	(Points)
1982-2004	Cambridge R.U.F.C. (82 Tries)	505	

Shaun Gadsby (20 May 1963 – 22 April 2015) was an English rugby player for Cambridge R.U.F.C. Gadsby was an openside flanker. He also played cricket. He was born in Wimpole, Cambridgeshire. He was educated at Felsted School.

Gadsby had a successful rugby career for Cambridge representing them 505 times in just over 20 years. He played his 500th game on 29 November 2003 against Diss and retired soon after. He is Cambridge's all-time most capped player, an achievement unlikely to ever be broken.

Gadsby died on 22 April 2015 after a 4-year struggle with leukaemia. The club paid its tributes to him by renaming the bar in his memory.
