= Graham Jarrett =

English cricketer

Personal information
- Full name: Graham Maurice Jarrett
- Born: 9 February 1937; Bedford, Bedfordshire
- Died: 26 April 2004 (aged 67); North Devon, Devon
- Batting: Right-handed
- Bowling: Leg break

Domestic team information
- Years: Team
- 1967–1977: Bedfordshire
- 1971–1974: Minor Counties

Career statistics
Competition	First-class	List A
Matches	3	7
Runs scored	32	26
Batting average	16.00	8.66
100s/50s	0/0	0/0
Top score	24*	14*
Balls bowled	378	486
Wickets	2	6
Bowling average	130.00	49.66
5 wickets in innings	0	0
10 wickets in match	0	0
Best bowling	2/83	3/21
Catches/stumpings	0/–	2/–
- Source: Cricinfo, 4 August 2011

Graham Maurice Jarrett (9 February 1937 – April 2004) was an English cricketer. Jarrett was a right-handed batsman who bowled leg breaks. He was born in Bedford, Bedfordshire and educated at Bedford Modern School.

Jarrett made his debut for Bedfordshire against Hertfordshire in the 1961 Minor Counties Championship. He played Minor counties cricket for Bedfordshire from 1961 to 1986, making 95 Minor Counties Championship appearances. He made his List A debut against Northamptonshire in the 1967 Gillette Cup. He made 6 further List A appearances, the last of which came against Northumberland in the 1977 Gillette Cup. In his 7 List A matches, he scored 26 runs at an average of 8.66, with a high score of 14 not out. With the ball, he took 6 wickets at a bowling average of 49.66, with best figures of 3/21.

He made his first-class debut for the Minor Counties against the touring Indians in 1971. He made 2 further first-class appearances, against the touring West Indians in 1973 and the touring Pakistanis in 1974. In his 3 matches, he scored 32 runs at an average of 16.00, with a high score of 24 not out. With the ball, he took 2 wickets at an expensive average of 130.00, with best figures of 2/83.
