= David Baker (cricketer, born 1945) =

English cricketer

Personal information
- Full name: David Henry John Baker
- Born: 2 February 1945 (age 81); Histon, Cambridgeshire, England
- Batting: Right-handed
- Bowling: Right-arm off break

Domestic team information
- Years: Team
- 1970–1985: Cambridgeshire

Career statistics
Competition	List A
Matches	3
Runs scored	30
Batting average	10.00
100s/50s	0/0
Top score	23
Catches/stumpings	1/–
- Source: Cricinfo, 25 April 2011

David Henry John Baker (born 2 February 1945) is a former English cricketer. Baker was a right-handed batsman who bowled off break. He was born in Histon, Cambridgeshire.

Baker made his debut for Cambridgeshire in the 1970 Minor Counties Championship against Norfolk. Baker played Minor counties cricket for Cambridgeshire from 1970 to 1985, including 77 Minor Counties Championship matches and 3 MCCA Knockout Trophy matches. In 1972, he made his List A debut against Buckinghamshire in the Gillette Cup. He played two further List A matches for Cambridgeshire, against Northamptonshire in 1975 and Warwickshire in 1982. In his three List A matches, he scored 30 runs at a batting average of 10.00, with a high score of 23.

He continues to play cricket at over-50s level for Cambridgeshire and in his youth he played field hockey for the county.
