= John Potter (cricketer) =

English cricketer

Personal information
- Full name: John Ritson Potter
- Born: 14 December 1949 (age 76); Middlesbrough, Yorkshire, England
- Batting: Right-handed

Domestic team information
- Years: Team
- 1973–1975: Oxfordshire

Career statistics
Competition	List A
Matches	2
Runs scored	94
Batting average	94.00
100s/50s	–/1
Top score	75*
Balls bowled	–
Wickets	–
Bowling average	–
5 wickets in innings	–
10 wickets in match	–
Best bowling	–
Catches/stumpings	–/–
- Source: Cricinfo, 24 May 2011

John Ritson Potter (born 14 December 1949) is a former English cricketer. Potter was a right-handed batsman. He was born in Middlesbrough, Yorkshire.

Potter made his debut for Oxfordshire in the 1973 Minor Counties Championship against Buckinghamshire. Potter played Minor counties cricket for Oxfordshire from 1973 to 1975 which included 20 Minor Counties Championship matches. He made his List A debut against Cornwall in the 1975 Gillette Cup. In this match he scored 75 unbeaten runs. He played a further List A match against Gloucestershire in the 2nd round of the same competition. In his second match, he scored 19 runs before being dismissed by Jack Davey.
