= Norman Featherstone =

South African cricketer (born 1949)

Personal information
- Full name: Norman George Featherstone
- Born: 20 August 1949 (age 77); Que Que, Southern Rhodesia
- Nickname: Smokey
- Batting: Right-handed
- Bowling: Right-arm off-spin

Domestic team information
- Years: Team
- 1967–68 to 1977–78: Transvaal
- 1968 to 1979: Middlesex
- 1980 to 1981: Glamorgan
- 1981–82: Northern Transvaal

Career statistics
Competition	First-class	List A
Matches	329	248
Runs scored	13,922	4269
Batting average	29.37	20.42
100s/50s	12/88	0/20
Top score	147	82*
Balls bowled	10,396	2247
Wickets	181	65
Bowling average	27.54	27.52
5 wickets in innings	4	0
10 wickets in match	0	n/a
Best bowling	5/32	4/10
Catches/stumpings	277/0	65/0
- Source: Cricinfo, 24 August 2021

Norman George Featherstone (born 20 August 1949) is a South African retired cricketer who had a long career in English county cricket.

== Education ==
Known as "Smokey", Featherstone was educated at King Edward VII High School in Johannesburg and toured England with the South African Schools team in 1967.

== Career ==
Featherstone made his debut for Transvaal B as a right-handed batsman and an off-break bowler in the 1967–68 Currie Cup competition. He represented Middlesex between 1968 and 1979, being awarded his county cap in 1971. In 1976, when Middlesex won their first title for 27 years, he scored 995 runs and took 36 wickets. In his career for Middlesex, he scored 8,882 runs in 216 first-class matches with eight centuries and took 137 wickets. He later played for Glamorgan in 1980 and 1981, scoring more than 1000 runs each season.

His best first-class performances were 147 for Middlesex against Yorkshire at Scarborough in 1975 and 5 for 32 for Middlesex against Nottinghamshire at Nottingham in 1978.

After captaining Northern Transvaal in the 1981–82 season, he retired from cricket to take up a career in sports promotions in South Africa. His positions included a management role at the Kyalami Formula One circuit near Johannesburg.
