= Charles Thornely =

English cricketer, poet, and writer

Personal information
- Full name: Charles William Alexander Thornely
- Born: 5 October 1958 (age 68); Lancaster, Lancashire, England
- Batting: Right-handed
- Relatives: Michael Thornely (nephew)

Domestic team information
- Years: Team
- 1986–1988: Cambridgeshire

Career statistics
Competition	List A
Matches	1
Runs scored	11
Batting average	–
100s/50s	–/–
Top score	11*
Catches/stumpings	2/–
- Source: Cricinfo, 2 October 2023

Charles William Alexander Thornely (born 5 October 1958 at Lancaster, Lancashire) is a former cricketer. He was educated at Sedbergh School where his father was headmaster. He is the uncle of Leicestershire and former Sussex cricketer Michael Thornely. He taught for many years in England at both primary and secondary level before teaching English abroad in Portugal, Poland and Italy.

He played cricket for Cambridgeshire at minor county level from 1986 to 1988 as a batsman, making one List A appearance against Warwickshire. Batting from the lower order he scored 11 not out.
