= Gerald McDougall =

English cricketer

Personal information
- Full name: Gerald James McDougall
- Born: 17 January 1967 (age 59); Manchester, Lancashire, England
- Batting: Right-handed
- Role: Wicketkeeper

Domestic team information
- Years: Team
- 2002–2003: Cambridgeshire

Career statistics
Competition	LA
Matches	2
Runs scored	6
Batting average	–
100s/50s	–/–
Top score	6*
Balls bowled	–
Wickets	–
Bowling average	–
5 wickets in innings	–
10 wickets in match	–
Best bowling	–
Catches/stumpings	1/3
- Source: Cricinfo, 19 July 2010

Gerald James McDougall (born 17 January 1967) is a former English cricketer. McDougall was a right-handed batsman who played primarily as a wicketkeeper. He was born at Manchester, Lancashire.

McDougall made his debut for Cambridgeshire in the 2002 MCCA Knockout Trophy, making his debut in that competition against Bedfordshire. From 2002 to 2003, he represented the county in 2 MCCA Knockout Trophy matches. He also represented the county in 4 Minor Counties Championship matches, with his final match for Cambridgeshire in that competition coming against Staffordshire.

McDougall also played 2 List-A matches for Cambridgeshire, against the Middlesex Cricket Board in the second round of the 2003 Cheltenham & Gloucester Trophy, which was played in 2002 and against Yorkshire in the third round of the same competition. In his 2 List-A matches, he scored 6 runs and behind the stumps he took a single catch and made 3 stumpings.
