= Samuel Shippey =

English cricketer

Personal information
- Full name: Samuel Ward Shippey
- Born: 13 June 1937 (age 89); Wisbech, Cambridgeshire, England
- Batting: Right-handed
- Bowling: Leg break
- Relatives: Peter Shippey (brother)

Domestic team information
- Years: Team
- 1953–1963 & 1978: Cambridgeshire

Career statistics
Competition	LA
Matches	2
Runs scored	2
Batting average	1.00
100s/50s	–/–
Top score	2
Balls bowled	–
Wickets	–
Bowling average	–
5 wickets in innings	–
10 wickets in match	–
Best bowling	–
Catches/stumpings	–/–
- Source: Cricinfo, 21 July 2010

Samuel Ward Shippey (born 13 June 1937) is a former English cricketer. Shippey was a right-handed batsman who bowled leg break. He was born at Wisbech, Cambridgeshire.

Shippey made his debut for Cambridgeshire in the 1958 Minor Counties Championship against Bedfordshire. From 1958 to 1963, he represented the county in 13 Minor Counties matches. Fifteen years after last representing Cambridgeshire in the championship, he played his fifteenth and final Minor Counties Championship match against Lincolnshire in 1978.

Shippey also represented Cambridgeshire in 2 List-A matches against Essex in the 1964 Gillette Cup and against Yorkshire in the 1967 Gillette Cup. In his 2 List-A matches, he scored just 2 runs.

== Family ==
His brother Tony represented the Marylebone Cricket Club, a combined Minor Counties cricket team in first-class cricket and Minor Counties North and Cambridgeshire in List-A cricket.
