= Paul Redfarn =

English cricketer

Personal information
- Full name: Paul Alan Redfarn
- Born: 23 December 1963 (age 62); Cambridge, Cambridgeshire, England
- Batting: Right-handed
- Role: Wicket-keeper

Domestic team information
- Years: Team
- 1982–1990: Cambridgeshire

Career statistics
Competition	LA
Matches	3
Runs scored	10
Batting average	10.00
100s/50s	–/–
Top score	15
Balls bowled	–
Wickets	–
Bowling average	–
5 wickets in innings	–
10 wickets in match	–
Best bowling	–
Catches/stumpings	1/–
- Source: Cricinfo, 10 January 2011

Paul Alan Redfarn (born 23 December 1963) is an English cricketer. Redfarn is a right-handed batsman who plays as a wicket-keeper. He was born in Cambridge, Cambridgeshire.

Redfarn made his Minor Counties Championship debut for Cambridgeshire in 1982 against Norfolk. From 1982 to 1990, he represented the county in 32 Championship matches, the last of which came against Lincolnshire. His MCCA Knockout Trophy debut for the county came in 1983 against Dorset. From 1983 to 1990 he represented the county in 12 Trophy matches, the last of which came against Norfolk. His debut List A appearance for the county came in the 1st round of the 1983 NatWest Trophy against Middlesex. He represented the county in 2 further List A matches against Warwickshire in the 1st round of the 1983 NatWest Trophy and Worcestershire in the 1989 NatWest Trophy. In his 3 matches, he scored 30 runs at a batting average of 10.00, with a high score of 21.

He currently plays club cricket for Burwell Cricket Club in the East Anglian Premier Cricket League.
