= Maurice Crouch =

English cricketer

Personal information
- Full name: Maurice Alfred Crouch
- Born: 9 August 1917; Wisbech, Cambridgeshire, England
- Died: 19 March 2001 (aged 83); Morocco
- Batting: Right-handed
- Relatives: David Fairey (son-in-law)

Domestic team information
- Years: Team
- 1951: Minor Counties
- 1950–1951: Marylebone Cricket Club
- 1936–1963: Cambridgeshire

Career statistics
Competition	FC	LA
Matches	4	1
Runs scored	205	28
Batting average	29.28	28.00
100s/50s	–/1	–/–
Top score	81	28
Balls bowled	–	–
Wickets	–	–
Bowling average	–	–
5 wickets in innings	–	–
10 wickets in match	–	–
Best bowling	–	–
Catches/stumpings	7/–	–/–
- Source: Cricinfo, 20 July 2010

Maurice Alfred Crouch (9 August 1917 – 19 March 2001) was an English cricketer. A right-handed batsman, he was born at Wisbech, Cambridgeshire.

Crouch played most of his cricket for Cambridgeshire in the Minor Counties Championship, making his debut against Bedfordshire in 1936. From 1936 to 1963, he represented the county in 118 Minor Counties matches. His final game for the county came in his only List-A appearance, which came in the 1964 Gillette Cup against Essex. In the match, he scored 28 runs before being dismissed by Robin Hobbs.

Crouch also played first-class cricket, representing the Marylebone Cricket Club against a combined Minor Counties cricket team in 1950. The following year, he represented the Minor Counties in a first-class match against Kent, in what was his only first-class appearance for a combined Minor Counties side. His final two first-class appearances came in 1952 for the Marylebone Cricket Club against Oxford University and Ireland. In his 4 first-class matches, he scored 205 runs at a batting average of 29.28, with a single half century high score of 81.

In 1941, Crouch was wounded in an attempted murder–suicide at a farm in Crowland, Lincolnshire. The gunman, 24-year-old Geoffrey Scrimshaw, shot himself with a revolver and died at the scene. Crouch was dating a woman that Scrimshaw had previously been engaged to.

Crouch died in Morocco on 19 March 2001.

== Family ==
His son-in-law David Fairey also represented Cambridgeshire in cricket.
