= Raymond Bond =

English cricketer

Personal information
- Full name: Raymond Ernest Bond
- Born: 7 September 1944 (age 82); Burnham, Buckinghamshire, England
- Batting: Left-handed
- Bowling: Right-arm medium-fast

Domestic team information
- Years: Team
- 1973–1974: Minor Counties South
- 1973: Minor Counties
- 1965–1979: Buckinghamshire

Career statistics
Competition	First-class	List A
Matches	1	9
Runs scored	–	35
Batting average	–	17.50
100s/50s	–/–	–/–
Top score	–	9
Balls bowled	132	558
Wickets	2	15
Bowling average	53.50	18.46
5 wickets in innings	–	1
10 wickets in match	–	–
Best bowling	1/33	5/17
Catches/stumpings	–/–	2/–
- Source: Cricinfo, 7 May 2011

Raymond Ernest Bond (born 7 September 1944) is a former English cricketer. Bond was a left-handed batsman who bowled right-arm medium-fast. He was born in Burnham, Buckinghamshire.

Bond made his debut for Buckinghamshire in the 1965 Minor Counties Championship against Suffolk. Bond played Minor counties cricket for Buckinghamshire from 1965 to 1979, which included 72 Minor Counties Championship matches. In 1969, he made in his List A debut for Buckinghamshire, against Middlesex in the Gillette Cup. He played 4 further List A matches for Buckinghamshire, the last coming against Suffolk in the 1979 Gillette Cup. He also played 4 List A matches for Minor Counties South, spread over the 1973 and 1974 Benson & Hedges Cup In total, he played 9 List A matches, taking 15 wickets at a bowling average of 18.46, with a single five wicket haul against Cambridgeshire in the 1972 Gillette Cup, with Bond taking figures of 5/17 in the match.

During his career, Bond played just the single first-class match. This came for a combined Minor Counties cricket team against the touring West Indians in 1973. He wasn't required to bat in this match, but did take 2 wickets: Roy Fredericks' in both the West Indian first-innings and second-innings.
