= Stuart York =

English cricketer (1938–2019)

Stuart York (21 September 1938 – 23 August 2019) was an English cricketer. He was a right-handed batsman and leg-break bowler who played for Buckinghamshire. He was born in Harpole.

York, who played for Northamptonshire Second XI between 1962 and 1970, and for Buckinghamshire in the Minor Counties Championship between 1971 and 1977, made a single List A appearance for the side, during the 1975 season, against Middlesex. From the upper-middle order, he scored 73 not out, the highest score in Buckinghamshire's innings. In 2014, he became the president of Buckinghamshire County Cricket Club.
