= Kenneth Yates =

Namibian cricketer

Personal information
- Full name: Kenneth Clement Yates
- Born: 4 August 1938 (age 88); Keetmanshoop, South-West Africa
- Batting: Right-handed
- Role: Wicketkeeper

Domestic team information
- Years: Team
- 1963–1964: Cambridgeshire
- 1961: Cambridge University

Career statistics
Competition	FC	LA
Matches	1	1
Runs scored	0	5
Batting average	–	5.00
100s/50s	–/–	–/–
Top score	0*	5
Balls bowled	–	–
Wickets	–	–
Bowling average	–	–
5 wickets in innings	–	–
10 wickets in match	–	–
Best bowling	–	–
Catches/stumpings	3/–	–/–
- Source: Cricinfo, 19 July 2010

Kenneth Clement Yates (born 4 August 1938) is a former cricketer who played first-class and List A cricket in England. Yates was a right-handed batsman and wicketkeeper. He was born at Keetmanshoop in what was then South-West Africa.

In 1961, Yates played a single first-class match for Cambridge University against the Free Foresters. In the match he batted once, remaining unbeaten on 0 and taking 3 catches behind the stumps.

In 1963, he played a single Minor Counties Championship match for Cambridgeshire against Wiltshire.

The following year, Yates played in a List A match for Cambridgeshire against Essex in the 1964 Gillette Cup. In his only List A match, he scored five runs but did not make any dismissals.
