= Bill Taylor (cricketer, born 1947) =

English cricketer (born 1947)

William Taylor (born 24 January 1947 in Manchester) is an English former first-class cricketer active 1971–77 who played for Nottinghamshire.
