= John Bailey (English cricketer) =

English cricketer (born 1940)

Personal information
- Full name: Harry John Bailey
- Born: 23 April 1940 (age 86); Stockton-on-Tees, County Durham, England
- Batting: Right-handed
- Bowling: Left-arm medium
- Relatives: David Bailey (brother)

Domestic team information
- Years: Team
- 1967–1969: Minor Counties
- 1961–1971: Durham

Career statistics
Competition	First-class	List A
Matches	3	4
Runs scored	50	57
Batting average	12.50	19.00
100s/50s	–/–	–/–
Top score	25	30
Balls bowled	180	156
Wickets	3	6
Bowling average	22.66	13.66
5 wickets in innings	–	–
10 wickets in match	–	–
Best bowling	2/20	3/37
Catches/stumpings	1/–	–/–
- Source: Cricinfo, 6 August 2011

Harry John Bailey (born 23 April 1940) is a former English cricketer. Bailey was a right-handed batsman who bowled left-arm medium pace. He was born in Stockton-on-Tees, County Durham.

Bailey made his debut for Durham against Staffordshire in the 1961 Minor Counties Championship. He played Minor counties cricket for Durham from 1961 to 1971, making 92 Minor Counties Championship appearances. He made his List A debut against Hertfordshire in the 1964 Gillette Cup. He made 3 further List A appearances, the last of which came against Worcestershire in the 1968 Gillette Cup. In his 4 List A matches, he scored 57 runs at an average of 19.00, with a high score of 30. With the ball, he took 6 wickets at a bowling average of 13.66, with best figures of 3/37. He captained Durham from 1968 to 1971.

He also played first-class cricket for the Minor Counties during his career. His first-class debut came against the touring Pakistanis in 1967. He made 2 further first-class appearances for the team, against the touring West Indians and the touring New Zealanders, both in 1969. In his 3 first-class matches, he scored 50 runs at an average of 12.50, with a high score of 25. With the ball, he took 3 wickets at an average of 22.66, with best figures of 2/20.

His brother, David, played first-class cricket for Lancashire.
