= Robert Milne (cricketer, born 1960) =

English cricketer

Personal information
- Full name: Robert Alexander Milne
- Born: 13 June 1960 (age 66); Hackney, London, England
- Batting: Right-handed
- Bowling: Right-arm medium

Domestic team information
- Years: Team
- 1985–1996: Cambridgeshire

Career statistics
Competition	LA
Matches	2
Runs scored	2
Batting average	1.00
100s/50s	–/–
Top score	2
Balls bowled	–
Wickets	–
Bowling average	–
5 wickets in innings	–
10 wickets in match	–
Best bowling	–
Catches/stumpings	1/–
- Source: Cricinfo, 28 November 2010

Robert Alexander Milne (born 13 June 1960) is a former English cricketer. Milne was a right-handed batsman who bowled right-arm medium pace. He was born in Hackney, London.

Milne made his Minor Counties Championship debut for Cambridgeshire against Bedfordshire in 1985. From 1985 to 1996, he represented the county in 31 Minor Counties Championship matches, the last of which against Bedfordshire. He made his debut in the MCCA Knockout Trophy in 1987 against Cheshire. From 1987 to 1991, he represented the county in 3 Trophy matches, the last of which came against Norfolk.

It was for Cambridgeshire that he made 2 List A appearances. These came against Derbyshire in the 1987 NatWest Trophy and Kent in the 1991 NatWest Trophy. In his 2 List A matches, he scored 2 runs at a batting average of 1.00, with a high score of 2, while in the field he took a single catch.

During his career, he also played a number of matches for Huntingdonshire between 1985 and 1997.
