= James Campbell-Ferguson =

English cricketer

Personal information
- Full name: Hugh James Campbell-Ferguson
- Born: 8 February 1940 (age 86); Royston, Hertfordshire, England
- Batting: Right-handed
- Role: Wicketkeeper

Domestic team information
- Years: Team
- 1965–1967: Cambridgeshire

Career statistics
Competition	LA
Matches	2
Runs scored	16
Batting average	–
100s/50s	–/–
Top score	12*
Balls bowled	–
Wickets	–
Bowling average	–
5 wickets in innings	–
10 wickets in match	–
Best bowling	–
Catches/stumpings	1/–
- Source: Cricinfo, 19 July 2010

Hugh James Campbell-Ferguson (born 8 February 1940) is a former English cricketer. Campbell-Ferguson was a right-handed batsman who played primarily as a wicketkeeper. He was born at Royston, Hertfordshire.

Campbell-Ferguson made his debut for Cambridgeshire in the 1965 Gillette Cup against Warwickshire. He represented Cambridgeshire in one further List-A match against Oxfordshire in the 1965 Gillette Cup.

Campbell-Ferguson also represented Cambridgeshire in the Minor Counties Championship, making his debut in that competition against Shropshire in 1965. From 1965 to 1967, he represented the county in 6 Minor Counties matches, with his final Minor Counties appearance coming against Lincolnshire.
