= Ivor Parker =

English cricketer

Ivor Parker (born 6 May 1952) was an English cricketer. He was a left-handed batsman and left-arm medium-fast bowler who played for Cambridgeshire. He was born in Hilton, Huntingdonshire.

Parker, who played club cricket for Hilton, Papworth, Huntington & District, and Ramsey Cricket Club, made his cricketing debut for Cambridgeshire in 1978. He made a single List A appearance for the side, during the 1982 NatWest Trophy, against Warwickshire. From the lower order, he scored 2 runs with the bat.

He bowled 12 overs in the match, conceding 55 runs.

Parker's brothers, Robin and Vince Parker, both played in miscellaneous matches for Huntingdonshire in 1987, as well as playing club cricket for Papworth.
