= David Fairey =

English cricketer

Personal information
- Full name: David Harold Richardson Fairey
- Born: 17 August 1940 (age 86); Linton, Cambridgeshire, England
- Batting: Right-handed
- Bowling: Left-arm medium
- Relatives: Maurice Crouch (father-in-law)

Domestic team information
- Years: Team
- 1957–1979: Cambridgeshire

Career statistics
| Competition | List A |
|---|---|
| Matches | 6 |
| Runs scored | 72 |
| Batting average | 14.40 |
| 100s/50s | –/– |
| Top score | 22 |
| Balls bowled | – |
| Wickets | – |
| Bowling average | – |
| 5 wickets in innings | – |
| 10 wickets in match | – |
| Best bowling | – |
| Catches/stumpings | 5/– |
- Source: Cricinfo, 27 April 2011

David Harold Richardson Fairey (born 17 August 1940) is a former English cricketer. Fairey was a right-handed batsman who bowled left-arm medium-pace. Born in Linton, Cambridgeshire, he was also a field hockey player.

Fairey made his debut for Cambridgeshire in the 1957 Minor Counties Championship against Hertfordshire. Fairey played Minor counties cricket for Cambridgeshire from 1957 to 1979, which included 88 Minor Counties Championship matches. In 1964, he made his List A debut against Essex in the Gillette Cup. He played five further List A matches for Cambridgeshire, the last coming against Northamptonshire in 1975. In his six List A matches, he scored 72 runs at a batting average of 14.40, with a high score of 22. With the ball he took 3 wickets at a bowling average of 20.33, with best figures of 2/8.

Outside of cricket, he played field hockey for Cambridgeshire and England. Fairey's father-in-law, Maurice Crouch, played List A and Minor counties cricket for Cambridgeshire, as well as first-class cricket for other teams.
