= Douglas Collard =

English cricketer

Personal information
- Full name: Douglas Christopher Collard
- Born: 26 September 1952 (age 74); Barnet, Hertfordshire, England
- Batting: Right-handed
- Bowling: Right-arm medium-fast

Domestic team information
- Years: Team
- 1971–1992: Cambridgeshire

Career statistics
Competition	List A
Matches	5
Runs scored	17
Batting average	8.50
100s/50s	–/–
Top score	9
Balls bowled	288
Wickets	5
Bowling average	33.20
5 wickets in innings	–
10 wickets in match	–
Best bowling	3/38
Catches/stumpings	–/–
- Source: Cricinfo, 14 April 2011

Douglas Christopher Collard (born 26 September 1952) is a former English cricketer. Collard was a right-handed batsman who bowled right-arm medium-fast. He was born in Barnet, Hertfordshire.

Collard made his debut for Cambridgeshire in the 1971 Minor Counties Championship against Bedfordshire. Collard played Minor counties cricket for Cambridgeshire from 1971 to 1992, including 108 Minor Counties Championship matches and 14 MCCA Knockout Trophy matches. In 1975, he made his List A debut against Northamptonshire in the Gillette Cup. He played four further List A matches for Cambridgeshire, the last coming against Worcestershire in the 1989 NatWest Trophy. In his five List A matches, he scored 17 runs at a batting average of 8.50, with a high score of 9. With the ball he took 5 wickets at a bowling average of 33.20, with best figures of 3/38.

He played Second XI cricket for the Derbyshire Second XI and the Middlesex Second XI.
