= Mark Brown (cricketer) =

Welsh cricketer (born 1958)

Mark Brown (born 3 September 1958) was a Welsh cricketer. He was a right-handed batsman and right-arm medium-fast bowler who played for Cambridgeshire. He was born in Bangor, Gwynedd.

Brown, who made his debut in the Minor Counties Championship at the age of 18, and who played in the competition between 1977 and 1986, made two List A appearances for the team, in the NatWest Trophy competitions of 1982 and 1983.

Brown failed to score a run in either innings in which he batted in List A cricket, though he took 3 wickets from 24 overs of bowling.
