= Ed Rodgers =

English cricketer (born 1979)

Edward Charles Rodgers (born 1 September 1979) is an English cricketer. He was a right-handed batsman and right-arm medium-pace bowler who played for Cambridgeshire. He was born in Wisbech.

Having represented the team during the 2002 Minor Counties Championship, Rodgers made a single List A appearance for the team. He made his debut in the ECB 38-County Cup in 2002, and played for the team during the 2002 Minor Counties Championship season.

Rodgers then made his only List A appearance during the 2003 C&G Trophy, against Yorkshire. He scored 23 runs and took figures of 0-41 from 4 overs of bowling.
