= Paul Haywood =

English cricketer (born 1947)

Paul Raymond Haywood (born 30 March 1947, in Leicester) is an English former cricketer active from 1969 to 1977 who played for Leicestershire. He appeared in 54 first-class matches as a righthanded batsman who bowled right arm medium pace. He scored 1,570 runs with a highest score of 100 * and took nine wickets with a best performance of four for 60.
