= Cristian Durant =

English cricketer

Personal information
- Full name: Cristian Dominic Durant
- Born: 23 January 1977 (age 49); Leicester, Leicestershire, England
- Batting: Right-handed
- Relatives: Wicket-keeper

Domestic team information
- Years: Team
- 1996–2001: Cambridgeshire

Career statistics
Competition	List A
Matches	7
Runs scored	19
Batting average	9.50
100s/50s	–/–
Top score	12*
Balls bowled	–
Wickets	–
Bowling average	–
5 wickets in innings	–
10 wickets in match	–
Best bowling	–
Catches/stumpings	5/2
- Source: Cricinfo, 21 February 2011

Cristian Dominic Durant (born 23 January 1977) is an English cricketer. Durant is a right-handed batsman who fields primarily as a wicket-keeper. He was born in Leicester, Leicestershire.

Durant made his debut for Cambridgeshire in the 1996 Minor Counties Championship against Northumberland. Between 1996 and 2001, he represented the county in 44 Championship matches, the last of which came against Northumberland. The following season he made his List A debut for the county against Hampshire in the 1st round of the 1997 NatWest Trophy. From 1997 to 2001, he represented the county in 7 List A matches, the last of which came against Somerset in the 3rd round of the 2001 Cheltenham & Gloucester Trophy. In his 7 List A matches, he scored 19 runs at a batting average of 9.50, with a high score of 12*. Behind the stumps he took 5 catches and made 2 stumpings. He had to wait until the 1999 season to play in the MCCA Knockout Trophy for Cambridgeshire, which he did against Norfolk before playing 4 further Trophy matches between 1999 and 2001, the last of which came against the Leicestershire Cricket Board.

He also played Second XI cricket for the Nottinghamshire Second XI (1994), the Leicestershire Second XI (1994–1995), the Somerset Second XI (1997) and the Kent Second XI (1999).
