= Roy Swetman =

English cricketer (1933–2023)

Personal information
- Full name: Roy Swetman
- Born: 25 October 1933; Westminster, London, England
- Died: 21 July 2023 (aged 89); Bristol, England
- Batting: Right-handed
- Bowling: Right-arm offbreak
- Role: Wicket-keeper

International information
- National side: England (1959 - 1960)
- Test debut (cap 391): 9 January 1959 v Australia
- Last Test: 9 March 1960 v West Indies

Career statistics
Competition	Tests	First-class
Matches	11	286
Runs scored	254	6,495
Batting average	16.93	19.21
100s/50s	–/1	2/22
Top score	65	115
Balls bowled	–	90
Wickets	–	1
Bowling average	–	69.00
5 wickets in innings	–	–
10 wickets in match	–	–
Best bowling	–	1/10
Catches/stumpings	24/2	530/66
- Source: Cricinfo

Roy Swetman (25 October 1933 – 21 July 2023) was an English cricketer, who played in eleven Tests as a wicket-keeper from 1959 to 1960.

== Life and career ==
Swetman was born in Westminster, London on 25 October 1933.

Commencing his career with Surrey, for whom he was understudy to Arthur McIntyre, Swetman soon came to notice as a deft performer, even though his appearances were limited. He went to Pakistan with the MCC 'A' team in 1955–56, though at the time he was playing mostly for Surrey's second eleven. He replaced McIntyre as Surrey's keeper in 1956.

A useful batsman, Swetman failed to consolidate his place in the England team when given first bite at replacing the long-serving Test wicket-keeper Godfrey Evans. He toured Australia and New Zealand with the Test team in 1958–59, playing his first Tests when Evans was injured. He played against India in 1959, then toured the West Indies as the primary wicket-keeper in 1959–60. He lost his place at the end of the 1959-60 tour to Jim Parks, and later also fell behind John Murray in the Test selectors' eyes.

Surprisingly retiring from county cricket after the 1961 season, he returned in 1966 to play for Nottinghamshire. Again leaving rather abruptly, this time in 1967, he emerged as a replacement for Barrie Meyer at Gloucestershire in 1972, but left when replaced by Andy Stovold in 1974.

After leaving first-class cricket Swetman became a publican, an antiques expert and an artist specializing in portraits of cricketers.

Roy Swetman died from pneumonia on 21 July 2023, at the age of 89.
