= Alan Burridge =

English sportsman and administrator

Personal information
- Full name: Alan James Burridge
- Born: 8 October 1936 (age 90); Sunderland, County Durham, England
- Nickname: Budgie
- Batting: Left-handed
- Bowling: Right-arm slow

Domestic team information
- Years: Team
- 1961–1972: Durham
- 1972–1974: Minor Counties North
- 1973–1974: Lincolnshire
- 1973: Minor Counties
- 1975: Minor Counties South
- 1975–1978: Hertfordshire
- 1976–1978: Minor Counties West

Career statistics
| Competition | First-class | List A |
|---|---|---|
| Matches | 1 | 36 |
| Runs scored | 42 | 639 |
| Batting average | 21.00 | 18.79 |
| 100s/50s | 0/0 | 2/0 |
| Top score | 37 | 95 |
| Balls bowled | – | 170 |
| Wickets | – | 5 |
| Bowling average | – | 28.20 |
| 5 wickets in innings | – | 0 |
| 10 wickets in match | – | 0 |
| Best bowling | – | 3/40 |
| Catches/stumpings | 0/– | 15/– |
- Source: Cricinfo, 27 April 2021

Alan James Burridge (born 8 October 1936) is an English former sportsman and administrator. He had an extensive Minor Counties cricket career through the 1960s and 1970s. He was secretary of Middlesex County Cricket Club from 1980 to 1981.

== Personal life ==
Burridge was born in Sunderland, County Durham. His father, Fred, was the groundsman at Roker Park and previously worked on the groundstaff at Lord's. Having completed his national service in the Royal Air Force, he worked variously as a salesman, in a bank, as director of a sports centre, and as a teacher at Enfield Grammar School. He played many sports including cricket and football, at one time playing as centre-forward for Gateshead in non-league football.

== Cricket career ==
Between 1961 and 1978, Burridge played 123 matches in the Minor Counties Championship, for Durham, Lincolnshire and Hertfordshire. During that time he also played 36 List A cricket matches for Durham, Hertfordshire and the Minor Counties North, South and West teams in the Benson and Hedges and Gillette Cup competitions. In 1972, he won two man-of-the-match awards in List A games, the first while playing for Minor Counties North in the Benson and Hedges, and the second playing for Durham in the Gillette. He also played for the Minor Counties team in one first class match against the touring West Indians in 1973.

Having worked as amenities and recreation manager at Watford Borough Council for many years, Burridge was appointed secretary of Middlesex in 1980, succeeding Arthur Flower. In 1981, prior to Ian Botham's resignation as England captain, Burridge was approached by England chairman of selectors Alec Bedser to ask then Middlesex captain Mike Brearley if he would be willing to captain England again. Burridge resigned as Middlesex secretary in August 1981.
