= David Bailey (cricketer, born 1944) =

English cricketer (born 1944)

Personal information
- Full name: David Bailey
- Born: 9 September 1944 (age 82); West Hartlepool, England
- Batting: Right-handed
- Bowling: Right-hand off break

Domestic team information
- Years: Team
- 1961–1967: Durham
- 1968–1972: Lancashire
- 1973–1984: Cheshire
- First-class debut: 8 June 1968 Lancashire v Cambridge University
- Last First-class: 4 August 1981 Minor Counties v Sri Lankans
- List A debut: 23 April 1967 Durham v Nottinghamshire
- Last List A: 19 May 1984 Minor Counties v Nottinghamshire

Career statistics
Competition	First-class	List A
Matches	32	56
Runs scored	1265	884
Batting average	28.75	17.00
100s/50s	1/7	0/5
Top score	136	83
Balls bowled	186	598
Wickets	3	11
Bowling average	46.33	32.45
5 wickets in innings	0	0
10 wickets in match	0	0
Best bowling	3–67	3–20
Catches/stumpings	13/–	10/–
- Source: CricketArchive, 2 May 2011

David Bailey (born 9 September 1944) is a retired English cricketer. He started his career in Minor Counties cricket with Durham, making his senior debut in 1961. Four years later Bailey joined Lancashire, and went on to play 27 first-class matches for the county. He achieved his highest first-class score of 136 in the match against Kent in July 1969. Bailey returned to Minor Counties cricket when he moved to Cheshire in 1973. He stayed with the county for 11 years, and was appointed captain for three seasons from 1974 to 1976.

In the 1971 season, Bailey was the professional player for Accrington Cricket Club in the Lancashire League.
