= Stewart Layton =

English cricketer (born 1981)

Stewart Layton (born 24 April 1981) was an English cricketer. He was a right-handed batsman and wicket-keeper who played for Cambridgeshire. He was born in Wisbech.

Layton, who represented Cambridgeshire in the Minor Counties Championship between 2003 and 2006, made a single List A appearance for the side, during the 2004 C&G Trophy, against Northamptonshire. From the tailend, he scored 0 not out.
