= Nigel Gadsby =

English cricketer

Personal information
- Full name: Nigel Timothy Gadsby
- Born: 1 February 1961 (age 65); Wimpole, Cambridgeshire, England
- Nickname: Gorby
- Height: 6 ft 2 in (1.88 m)
- Batting: Right-handed
- Bowling: absolute heat
- Role: 3rd man
- Relatives: Brian Gadsby (father), Shaun Gadsby (brother)

Domestic team information
- Years: Team
- 1978–2004: Cambridgeshire

Career statistics
Competition	List A
Matches	22
Runs scored	344
Batting average	17.20
100s/50s	–/2
Top score	63
Balls bowled	235
Wickets	7
Bowling average	32.57
5 wickets in innings	–
10 wickets in match	–
Best bowling	3/44
Catches/stumpings	5/–
- Source: Cricinfo, 28 April 2011

Nigel Timothy Gadsby (born 1 February 1961) is a former English cricketer. Gadsby was a right-handed batsman who bowled leg break. He also played field hockey. He was born in Wimpole, Cambridgeshire. He was educated at Felsted School and later at the Royal Agricultural College, Cirencester.

Gadsby made his debut for Cambridgeshire in the 1978 Minor Counties Championship against Suffolk. Gadsby played Minor counties cricket for Cambridgeshire from 1978 to 2004, which included 162 Minor Counties Championship matches and 37 MCCA Knockout Trophy matches. In 1982, he made his List A debut against Warwickshire in the NatWest Trophy. He played 21 further List A matches for Cambridgeshire, the last coming against Northamptonshire in 2004 Cheltenham & Gloucester Trophy. In his 22 List A matches, he scored 344 runs at a batting average of 17.20, with two half centuries and a high score of 63. This came against Middlesex in the 1983 NatWest Trophy, with his innings being ended by John Emburey. With the ball he took 7 wickets at a bowling average of 32.57, with best figures of 3/44.

In his youth he played field hockey for Cambridgeshire, making over 100 appearances, also a renowned game shot, His father Brian played List A and Minor counties cricket for Cambridgeshire, as well as hockey for the county.
