= Michael Thornely =

English cricketer

Personal information
- Full name: Michael Alistair Thornely
- Born: 19 October 1987 (age 39); Camden, London, England
- Batting: Right-handed
- Bowling: Right-arm medium

Domestic team information
- Years: Team
- 2007–2010: Sussex
- 2011–2012: Unicorns
- 2011/12: Mashonaland
- 2012–2014: Leicestershire (squad no. 7)

Career statistics
Competition	FC	LA	T20
Matches	40	46	12
Runs scored	1,455	1,171	64
Batting average	22.04	29.27	10.66
100s/50s	2/6	1/6	0/0
Top score	131	105*	20
Balls bowled	806	326	21
Wickets	10	5	0
Bowling average	53.30	73.00	–
5 wickets in innings	0	0	–
10 wickets in match	0	0	–
Best bowling	2/14	1/20	–
Catches/stumpings	32/–	13/–	3/–
- Source: CricInfo, 10 March 2023

Michael Alistair Thornely (born 19 October 1987) is an English former professional cricketer who last played for Leicestershire County Cricket Club. He is a right-handed batsman and occasional right arm medium pace bowler.

Thornely started his first-class career with Sussex in 2007 season, after scoring 800 runs in the Second XI Championship. He was released from Sussex following the conclusion of the 2010 season. In the 2011 season he played 2nd XI cricket for Somerset, Nottinghamshire, Essex and Kent, but did not win a contract at any. Although, he did play first-class cricket for the Unicorns, a team made up from players without county contracts. Whilst playing for the Unicorns he scored an unbeaten century against Somerset.

In 2012 he had a trial with Leicestershire and impressed enough to earn a contract and went on to score centuries against Glamorgan on his debut, and later against Essex. His performances earned him a contract until the end of the 2014 season.

== Career best performances ==
	Batting				Bowling (innings)			
	Score	Fixture	Venue	Season	Figures	Fixture	Venue	Season
FC	131	Leicestershire v Glamorgan	Cardiff	2012	2/14	Sussex v Worcestershire	Hove	2010
LA	105 not out	Unicorns v Somerset	Taunton	2011	1/20	Leicestershire Foxes v Australians	Leicester	2012
T20	20	Leicestershire Foxes v Lancashire Lightning	Manchester	2013				
