= Tony Shippey =

English cricketer

Personal information
- Full name: Peter Antony Shippey
- Born: 31 August 1939 (age 87); Newton, Cambridgeshire, England
- Batting: Left-handed
- Bowling: Right-arm off break
- Relatives: Samuel Shippey (brother)

Domestic team information
- Years: Team
- 1972: Minor Counties North
- 1969–1971: Minor Counties
- 1967: Marylebone Cricket Club
- 1957–1983: Cambridgeshire

Career statistics
Competition	First-class	List A
Matches	4	9
Runs scored	187	48
Batting average	31.16	5.33
100s/50s	–/1	–/–
Top score	94*	37
Balls bowled	–	–
Wickets	–	–
Bowling average	–	–
5 wickets in innings	–	–
10 wickets in match	–	–
Best bowling	–	–
Catches/stumpings	–/–	1/–
- Source: Cricinfo, 27 April 2011

Peter Antony ("Tony") Shippey (born 31 August 1939) is a former English cricketer. Shippey was a left-handed batsman who bowled right-arm off break. He was born in Newton, Cambridgeshire.

Shippey made his debut for Cambridgeshire in the 1957 Minor Counties Championship against the Essex Second XI. Shippey played Minor counties cricket for Cambridgeshire from 1957 to 1983, which included 65 Minor Counties Championship matches. In 1964, he made his List A debut against Essex in the Gillette Cup. He played four further List A matches for Cambridgeshire, the last coming against Buckinghamshire in 1972. In his five List A matches for the county, Wing scored 41 runs at a batting average of 8.20, with a high score of 37.

Shippey also played List A cricket on four occasions for Minor Counties North, appearing for them in the 1972 Benson & Hedges Cup. In these four matches, he scored just 7 runs at an average of 1.75. He also appeared in a handful of first-class matches. His debut first-class match came for the Marylebone Cricket Club against Cambridge University in 1967. In his only first-class match for the Marylebone Cricket Club, he opened the batting in their first-innings, scoring 15 runs before being dismissed by Stephen Russell. He later played three first-class fixtures for the Minor Counties, two in 1969 against the touring West Indians and New Zealanders, and later in 1971 against the touring Indians. In his four first-class matches, he scored 187 runs at an average of 31.16, with a single half century high score of 94* against the West Indians

His brother Samuel played Minor counties and List A cricket for Cambridgeshire.
