= John Jacklin =

English cricketer (born 1947)

John Jacklin (born 12 December 1947) was an English cricketer. He was a right-handed batsman and right-arm medium-fast bowler who played for Cambridgeshire. He was born in Cambridge.

Jacklin, who represented Cambridgeshire in the Minor Counties Championship between 1975 and 1977, made a single List A appearance for the side, in the 1975 Gillette Cup, against Northamptonshire.

Jacklin scored 0 not out and took bowling figures of 3-40 from 12 overs of bowling, taking the wicket of Pakistan Test cricketer Mushtaq Mohammad, though this was not enough to save the team from a 69-run defeat.
