= Freddie Jakeman =

English cricketer

Personal information
- Full name: Frederick Jakeman
- Born: 10 January 1920; Holmfirth, Yorkshire, England
- Died: 17 May 1986 (aged 66); Huddersfield, Yorkshire, England
- Batting: Left-handed

Domestic team information
- Years: Team
- 1946 to 1947: Yorkshire
- 1949 to 1954: Northamptonshire

Career statistics
Competition	First-class
Matches	134
Runs scored	5952
Batting average	32.00
100s/50s	11/28
Top score	258 not out
Balls bowled	318
Wickets	5
Bowling average	32.40
5 wickets in innings	0
10 wickets in match	0
Best bowling	2/8
Catches/stumpings	42/0
- Source: Cricinfo, 21 November 2019

Frederick Jakeman (10 January 1920 – 17 May 1986) was an English first-class cricketer, who played for Yorkshire County Cricket Club in 1946 and 1947, and for Northamptonshire from 1949 to 1954. He also played first-class cricket for the Marylebone Cricket Club (MCC) in 1952.

Born in Holmfirth, Yorkshire, Jakeman was a left-handed batsman who played 134 games in all, scoring 5,952 runs at 32.00, with a best score of 258 not out against Essex. Other notable innings include an unbeaten 176 against Surrey and 169 against Derbyshire. He scored eleven centuries in all with 28 fifties. He took 42 catches and took five wickets at an average of 32.40.

He also appeared for an England XI in 1951, the Rest of England in 1952, for Yorkshire Second XI from 1946 to 1948, for a Scotland XI in 1945 and the Minor Counties in 1948. His son, Stuart Jakeman, played three games for Northants in 1962 and 1963.

Jakeman was a first-class umpire from 1961 to 1972. A heavy scorer in League cricket, he had engagements with Lightcliffe C.C., Salts C.C. and David Tractors C.C. and, in 1949, he scored a century for Holmfirth C.C. before Easter, the first batsman to do so in senior League cricket.

He died in May 1986 in Huddersfield, Yorkshire, at the age of 66.
