= David Norman (cricketer) =

English cricketer

Personal information
- Full name: David Patrick Norman
- Born: 19 September 1968 (age 58); Ely, Cambridgeshire, England
- Batting: Right-handed
- Bowling: Right-arm medium

Domestic team information
- Years: Team
- 1989–2000: Cambridgeshire

Career statistics
Competition	LA
Matches	7
Runs scored	58
Batting average	9.66
100s/50s	–/–
Top score	14
Balls bowled	–
Wickets	–
Bowling average	–
5 wickets in innings	–
10 wickets in match	–
Best bowling	–
Catches/stumpings	–/–
- Source: Cricinfo, 28 November 2010

David Patrick Norman (born 19 September 1968) is a former English cricketer. Norman was a right-handed batsman who bowled right-arm medium pace. He was born at Ely, Cambridgeshire.

Norman made his Minor Counties Championship debut for Cambridgeshire against Suffolk in 1989. From 1989 to 1999, he represented the county in 60 Minor Counties Championship matches, the last of which against Bedfordshire. He made his debut in the MCCA Knockout Trophy in 1990 against Norfolk. From 1990 to 1995, he represented the county in 10 Trophy matches, the last of which came against Buckinghamshire.

He made his debut in List A cricket for Cambridgeshire against Worcestershire in the 1989 NatWest Trophy. From 1989 to 2000, he represented the county in 7 List A matches, the last of which came against Cumberland in the 2000 NatWest Trophy. Across 7 List A matches, he scored 58 runs at a batting average of 9.66, with a high score of 14.
