= Alan Wilson (cricketer, born 1936) =

English cricketer

Personal information
- Full name: Alan Robert Wilson
- Born: 19 November 1936 (age 89); Littleport, Cambridgeshire, England
- Batting: Right-handed
- Bowling: Right-arm medium

Domestic team information
- Years: Team
- 1960–1971: Cambridgeshire

Career statistics
Competition	List A
Matches	4
Runs scored	1
Batting average	1.00
100s/50s	0/0
Top score	1*
Balls bowled	144
Wickets	3
Bowling average	24.00
5 wickets in innings	0
10 wickets in match	0
Best bowling	3/14
Catches/stumpings	0/–
- Source: Cricinfo, 23 July 2010

Alan Robert Wilson (born 19 November 1936) is a former English cricketer. Wilson was a right-handed batsman who bowled right-arm medium pace. He was born at Littleport, Cambridgeshire.

Wilson made his debut for Cambridgeshire in the 1960 Minor Counties Championship against Norfolk. From 1960 to 1971, he represented the county in 32 Minor Counties matches, with his final appearance coming against Shropshire in 1971.

Wilson also represented Cambridgeshire in List A cricket, making his debut for the county in that format against Essex in the 1964 Gillette Cup. From 1964 to 1967, he represented the county in 4 List A matches, with his final List A match coming against Yorkshire in the 1967 Gillette Cup. In his 4 List A matches, he took 3 wickets at a bowling average of 24.00, with best figures of 3/14.
