= Barry Stead =

English cricketer

Barry Stead (21 June 1939 – 15 April 1980) was an English first-class cricketer, who played for Yorkshire and Nottinghamshire.

Born in Leeds, Yorkshire, England, Stead was a hard working fast-medium left-arm bowler, who made his first-class debut playing for Yorkshire in 1959. In his debut game, he took 7 for 76 against the touring Indians at Bradford. He joined Nottinghamshire in 1962, after failing to turn up when selected for Essex early in the season, and he played for them for fourteen years. In 1969, he topped the national first-class wicket taking list, with seventy one victims. His career best innings bowling figures of 8 for 44 came during 1972, and included a hat-trick. He finished the year with 98 wickets, and was elected the Professional Cricketers' Association 'Player of the Year'. Stead was a useful, hard hitting lower order batsman, who was occasionally sent up the batting order in one day matches.

He died of cancer, at the age of 40, in Drighlington, Morley, West Yorkshire.
