= Bob Ratcliffe =

English cricketer (1951–2023)

Robert Malcolm Ratcliffe (29 November 1951 – 28 August 2023) was an English cricketer who played for Lancashire from 1972 to 1980. He was a right-handed medium pace bowler and a middle to lower order batsman. In 82 first-class matches he took 205 wickets with an average of 26.39 and a best of 7 for 58. He scored 1022 runs with an average of 16.48 and a high score of 101 not out. Throughout his career he was dogged by injuries, these forcing him into early retirement at the age of 28. He later played Minor Counties cricket for Cumberland.

Ratcliffe was born in Accrington, Lancashire on 29 November 1951. He died in Marlborough, Wiltshire on 28 August 2023, at the age of 71.

- Batting: Right-hand batsman
- Bowling: Right-arm medium pace
- Relations: Son: LJ Ratcliffe

Teams: Lancashire (Main FC: 1972–1980); Lancashire (Main ListA: 1972–1980); All teams Lancashire Cap: 1976.
