= Douglas Vincent (cricketer) =

Scottish cricketer (born 1954)

Douglas Vincent (born 2 September 1954) was a Scottish cricketer. He was a right-handed batsman who played for Cambridgeshire. He was born in Glasgow.

Vincent, who played in the Minor Counties Championship for the team for the first time in 1982, made his only List A appearance in the NatWest Trophy competition of 1986, against Yorkshire. From the lower-middle order, he scored 6 runs.
